= 2011–12 Serie D =

Serie D
- Season: 2011–12

Geographical distribution of teams in the 2011–12 season

The 2011–12 Serie D was the sixty-fourth edition of the top level Italian non-professional football championship. It represented the fifth tier in the Italian football league system. It consisted of 168 teams divided into six 18-team divisions and three 20-team divisions.

In the summer 2011 Montecchio Maggiore was readmitted in Serie D to the judgment of the High Court of Justice, that has transformed the score of Montebelluna-Este from 2–1 to 0–3, for infringement of the rule on under. And the last team admitted was Verbano, increasing the total number of teams to 168.

On December 15, 2011 Aquanera was excluded by the National Disciplinary Committee for irregularities at registration, reducing the total number of teams to 167. All matches played by the team have been annulled.

Each team played two matches against every other team in its own division; a total of 34 matches for the five groups of 18 teams, 36 matches for the group A of 19 teams and 38 matches for the groups B-D of 20 teams.

== Promotions ==
The nine division winners are automatically promoted to Lega Pro Seconda Divisione 2012–13.

On 25 April 2012 Sterilgarda Castiglione and Pontedera became the first teams to be promoted from Serie D in the season, winning respectively the Girone B and E with two weeks remaining in the schedule.

On 29 April 2012 were promoted Venezia, Forlì, Teramo and HinterReggio winning respectively the Girone C, D, F and I with one week remaining in the schedule.

On 6 May 2012 were promoted V.d.A. Saint-Christophe, Salerno and Martina Franca winning respectively the Girone A, G and H.

== Playoffs ==
Teams placed second through fifth in each division enter a playoff tournament, after the regular season, where the nine winners will compete among themselves with the best semifinalist and the finalist of Coppa Italia Serie D to determine three of the four semi-finalists. The fourth is the winner of Coppa Italia Serie D.

The final match of playoffs, between the winners of the semifinals, was won by Cosenza, but it is not automatically promoted. It finishes first and the other finalist SandonàJesolo comes in second in this 39-team playoff. Eventually these teams may be included up to Lega Pro Seconda Divisione if one or more current teams runs into financial difficulties and so are not admitted in this league.

== Relegations Playout ==
- In the groups C-E-F-G-H-I of 18 teams the two last-placed teams (17th and 18th) with the 16th, if the 13th place is more of 8 points ahead of it and the 15th, if the 14th place is more of 8 points ahead of this, are relegated directly. Otherwise the teams ranked 13th to 16th play a two-legged playout (13th vs 16th, and 14th vs 15th).
- In the group A of 19 teams the last-placed team (19th) with the 18th, if the 15th place is more of 8 points ahead of it and the 17th, if the 16th place is more of 8 points ahead of this, are relegated directly. Otherwise the teams ranked 15th to 18th play a two-legged playout (15th vs 18th, and 16th vs 17th).
- In the groups B-D of 20 teams the two last-placed teams (19th and 20th) with the 18th, if the 15th place is more of 8 points ahead of it and the 17th, if the 16th place is more of 8 points ahead of this, are relegated directly. Otherwise the teams ranked 15th to 18th play a two-legged playout (15th vs 18th, and 16th vs 17th).

== Tie-Breakers ==
If the two teams finish in an aggregate tie for to decide who is promoted and relegated, one tie breaker will be played in neutral ground, with possible extra time and penalties.

== Scudetto Dilettanti ==
The nine division winners enter a tournament to determine the over-all Serie D champion and is awarded the Scudetto Dilettanti. The winner is Venezia.

== Events ==
=== Start of season ===
Given a normal season where there are no team failures and special promotions, Serie D would feature 9 teams that had been relegated from Lega Pro Seconda Divisione, 36 teams that had been promoted from Eccellenza, and 122 teams that had played in Serie D the year before.

Due to ten bankruptcies and one extra promotion in Serie D, the 2011–12 season was to feature 3 teams that played in the 2010-11 Lega Pro Seconda Divisione season, including the admitted Brindisi (Girone H) that went bankrupt in that league, 42 teams that played in the 2010-11 Eccellenza season and 119 teams that played in 2010–11 Serie D, including the readmitted Montecchio Maggiore and the excluded Aquanera respectively after the judgment of the High Court of Justice and the National Disciplinary Committee.

The league also admitted three of the teams that were excluded from the professional leagues. Ravenna (Girone D), Salerno, formerly Salernitana (Girone G) and Cosenza (Girone I) which all played in the 2010-11 Lega Pro Prima Divisione season. The league further admitted eleven teams from Eccellenza to fill the vacancies created. These teams are:

- Villafranca which finished 14th in Serie D 2010–11 Girone B
- Carpenedolo which finished 15th in Serie D 2010–11 Girone D
- Sestese which finished 13th in Serie D 2010–11 Girone E
- Miglianico which finished 18th in Serie D 2010–11 Girone F
- Sant'Antonio Abate which finished 13th in Serie D 2010–11 Girone H
- Lascaris which finished 2nd in Eccellenza Piedmont Girone B and was eliminated in the national play-off
- Verbano which finished 3rd in Eccellenza Lombardy Girone A and was eliminated in the national play-off
- Fidenza which finished 2nd in Eccellenza Emilia–Romagna Girone A and was eliminated in the national play-off
- Cerea which finished 2nd in Eccellenza Veneto Girone A and was eliminated in the national play-off
- Adrano which finished 3rd in Eccellenza Sicily Girone B and was eliminated in the national play-off
- Civitavecchia which finished 2nd in Eccellenza Lazio Girone A and was eliminated in the national play-off.

== Standings ==
=== Girone A ===
==== Teams ====
Teams from Aosta Valley, Piedmont, (Note: Aquanera was excluded by the National Disciplinary Committee for irregularities at registration. All matches played by the team have been annulled.) Liguria, & Lombardy

| Club | City | Stadium | Capacity | 2010–11 season |
|---|---|---|---|---|
| Acqui | Acqui Terme | Jona Ottolenghi | 1,500 | 10th in Serie D Girone A |
| Albese | Alba | San Cassiano | 2,050 | 17th in Serie D Girone A |
| Asti | Asti | Censin Bosia | 6,000 | 3rd in Serie D Girone A |
| Bogliasco | Bogliasco | Comunale | 500 | 1st in Eccellenza Liguria |
| Borgosesia | Borgosesia | Comunale | 2,500 | 9th in Serie D Girone A |
| Cantù San Paolo | Cantù | Comunale | 1,000 | 10th in Serie D Girone B |
| Chiavari Caperana | Chiavari | Angelo Daneri | 2,300 | 12th in Serie D Girone A |
| Chieri | Chieri | Piero De Paoli | 2,250 | 13th in Serie D Girone A |
| Derthona | Tortona | Fausto Coppi | 3,500 | 15th in Serie D Girone A |
| Folgore Caratese | Carate Brianza | XXV Aprile | 3,000 | 15th in Serie D Girone B(as Caratese) |
| Lascaris | Pianezza | Comunale | 1,500 | 2nd in Eccellenza Piedmont Girone B |
| Lavagnese | Lavagna | Edoardo Riboli | 800 | 8th in Serie D Girone A |
| Naviglio Trezzano | Trezzano sul Naviglio | Comunale | 300 | 1st in Eccellenza Lombardy Girone A |
| Novese | Novi Ligure | Costante Girardengo | 3,500 | 14th in Serie D Girone A |
| Pro Imperia | Imperia | Nino Ciccione | 1,500 | 2nd in Eccellenza Liguria |
| Santhià | Santhià | Fabio Pairotto | 500 | 6th in Serie D Girone A |
| V.d.A. Saint-Christophe | Saint-Christophe | Comunale | 2,020 | 2nd in Serie D Girone A |
| Verbano | Besozzo | Comunale | 2,000 | 3rd in Eccellenza Lombardy Girone A |
| Villalvernia V.B. | Villalvernia (playing in Tortona) | Fausto Coppi | 3,500 | 1st in Eccellenza Piedmont Girone B |

==== League table ====
| Pos | Team | Pld | W | D | L | GF | GA | GD | Pts | Promotion or relegation |
|---|---|---|---|---|---|---|---|---|---|---|
| 1 | V.d.A. Saint-Christophe (C, P) | 36 | 25 | 8 | 3 | 88 | 44 | +44 | 83 | Promotion to Lega Pro Seconda Divisione |
| 2 | Chieri | 36 | 27 | 1 | 8 | 66 | 34 | +32 | 82 | Qualification for Promotion play-off |
| 3 | Santhià | 36 | 19 | 10 | 7 | 69 | 39 | +30 | 64 (Note: Albese and Santhià were docked 3 points due to financial irregularities.) | Qualification for Promotion play-off |
| 4 | Novese | 36 | 17 | 9 | 10 | 54 | 41 | +13 | 60 | Qualification for Promotion play-off |
| 5 | Lavagnese | 36 | 15 | 13 | 8 | 55 | 35 | +20 | 58 | Qualification for Promotion play-off |
| 6 | Borgosesia | 36 | 15 | 10 | 11 | 55 | 39 | +16 | 55 | |
| 7 | Villalvernia V.B. | 36 | 15 | 10 | 11 | 55 | 45 | +10 | 55 | |
| 8 | Derthona | 36 | 15 | 9 | 12 | 52 | 46 | +6 | 54 | |
| 9 | Chiavari Caperana | 36 | 13 | 12 | 11 | 52 | 50 | +2 | 51 | |
| 10 | Imperia | 36 | 13 | 11 | 12 | 46 | 49 | −3 | 50 (Note: Pro Imperia 10th about the direct clashes.) | |
| 11 | Folgore Caratese | 36 | 11 | 17 | 8 | 55 | 39 | +16 | 50 | |
| 12 | Bogliasco | 36 | 13 | 9 | 14 | 49 | 48 | +1 | 48 | Qualification for Promotion play-off (Note: Bogliasco qualified for the third round of the Promotion play-off as best semifinalist of Coppa Italia Serie D 2011-12.) |
| 13 | Naviglio Trezzano | 36 | 11 | 14 | 11 | 46 | 45 | +1 | 47 | |
| 14 | Verbano | 36 | 12 | 10 | 14 | 50 | 53 | −3 | 46 | |
| 15 | Acqui (R) | 36 | 11 | 7 | 18 | 35 | 51 | −16 | 39 (Note: Acqui was docked 1 point for administrative irregularities.) (Note: The score of Acqui-Cantù S.Paolo has become 0-3 by sports judgment for administrative irregularities of Acqui.) | Relegation to Eccellenza |
| 16 | Asti | 36 | 10 | 9 | 17 | 45 | 55 | −10 | 39 | |
| 17 | Albese (R) | 36 | 7 | 10 | 19 | 40 | 62 | −22 | 28 | Relegation to Eccellenza |
| 18 | Cantù San Paolo (R) | 36 | 2 | 6 | 28 | 20 | 90 | −70 | 12 | Relegation to Eccellenza |
| 19 | Lascaris (R) | 36 | 0 | 7 | 29 | 30 | 97 | −67 | 7 | Relegation to Eccellenza |

Updated to match(es) played on 6 May 2012. Source:
Rules for classification: 1) points; 2) goal difference; 3) number of goals scored.
(C) Champions; (P) Promoted; (R) Relegated

=== Girone B ===
==== Teams ====
Teams from Lombardy, Piedmont & Emilia-Romagna

| Club | City | Stadium | Capacity | 2010–11 season |
|---|---|---|---|---|
| AlzanoCene | Alzano Lombardo and Cene (playing in Alzano Lombardo) | Carillo Pesenti Pigna | 1,900 | 12th in Serie D Girone B |
| Atletico BP Pro Piacenza | Piacenza | G. Siboni | 800 | 1st in Eccellenza Emilia–Romagna Girone A (as BettolaPonte) |
| Aurora Seriate | Seriate | Comunale | 1,000 | 1st in Eccellenza Lombardy Girone C |
| Caronnese | Caronno Pertusella | Comunale | 1,000 | 7th in Serie D Girone B (as Insubria Caronnese) |
| Carpenedolo | Carpenedolo | Mundial '82 | 3,000 | 15th in Serie D Girone D |
| Castellana | Castel Goffredo | Comunale | 1,500 | 13th in Serie D Girone B |
| Colognese | Cologno al Serio | Antonio Locatelli | 1,000 | 4th in Serie D Girone B |
| Darfo Boario | Darfo Boario Terme | Comunale | 1,200 | 8th in Serie D Girone B |
| Fidenza | Fidenza | Dario Ballotta | 1,400 | 2nd in Eccellenza Emilia–Romagna Girone A |
| Fiorenzuola | Fiorenzuola d'Arda | Comunale | 4,000 | 11th in Serie D Girone D |
| Gallaratese | Gallarate | Atleti Azzurri d'Italia | 1,320 | 7th in Serie D Girone A |
| Gozzano | Gozzano | Comunale | 4,000 | 1st in Eccellenza Piedmont Girone A |
| MapelloBonate | Mapello and Bonate Sopra (playing in Mapello) | Comunale | 1,000 | 1st in Eccellenza Lombardy Girone B (as Mapello) |
| Olginatese | Olginate | Comunale | 1,000 | 5th in Serie D Girone B |
| Pizzighettone | Pizzighettone | Comunale | 2,500 | 8th in Serie D Girone D |
| Pontisola | Ponte San Pietro and Terno d'Isola (playing in Ponte San Pietro) | Matteo Legler | 2,000 | 3rd in Serie D Girone B |
| Rudianese | Rudiano | Comunale | 1,000 | 10th in Serie D Girone D |
| Seregno | Seregno | Ferruccio | 3,700 | 5th in Serie D Girone A |
| Sterilgarda Castiglione | Castiglione delle Stiviere | Ugo Lusetti | 2,500 | 9th in Serie D Girone B |
| Voghera | Voghera | Giovanni Parisi | 4,000 | 2nd in Serie D Girone B |

==== League table ====
| Pos | Team | Pld | W | D | L | GF | GA | GD | Pts | Promotion or relegation |
|---|---|---|---|---|---|---|---|---|---|---|
| 1 | Sterilgarda Castiglione (C, P) | 38 | 23 | 7 | 8 | 55 | 36 | +19 | 76 | Promotion to Lega Pro Seconda Divisione |
| 2 | Pontisola | 38 | 19 | 12 | 7 | 53 | 34 | +19 | 69 | Qualification for Promotion play-off |
| 3 | Olginatese | 38 | 18 | 11 | 9 | 57 | 43 | +14 | 65 | Qualification for Promotion play-off |
| 4 | Pizzighettone (Note: Pizzighettone moved to the city of Crema. It will play in the italian football as U.S. Pergolettese 1932.) | 38 | 17 | 13 | 8 | 51 | 36 | +15 | 64 | Qualification for Promotion play-off |
| 5 | MapelloBonate | 38 | 16 | 13 | 9 | 60 | 51 | +9 | 61 | Qualification for Promotion play-off |
| 6 | Caronnese | 38 | 15 | 12 | 11 | 58 | 42 | +16 | 57 | |
| 7 | AlzanoCene | 38 | 15 | 9 | 14 | 55 | 45 | +10 | 54 | |
| 8 | Castellana | 38 | 13 | 12 | 13 | 54 | 53 | +1 | 51 | |
| 9 | Fidenza | 38 | 12 | 14 | 12 | 35 | 39 | −4 | 50 | |
| 10 | Rudianese (R) | 38 | 11 | 16 | 11 | 39 | 41 | −2 | 49 (Note: Rudianese 10th about the direct clashes.) | Relegation to Promozione |
| 11 | Atletico Pro Piacenza | 38 | 13 | 10 | 15 | 45 | 44 | +1 | 49 | |
| 12 | Voghera | 38 | 12 | 13 | 13 | 36 | 34 | +2 | 49 | |
| 13 | Aurora Seriate | 38 | 12 | 13 | 13 | 44 | 45 | −1 | 49 | |
| 14 | Gozzano | 38 | 10 | 18 | 10 | 43 | 43 | 0 | 48 (Note: Gozzano 14th and safe about the direct clashes with Darfo Boario, forced instead to play in relegation playout.) | |
| 15 | Darfo Boario | 38 | 11 | 15 | 12 | 44 | 47 | −3 | 48 | Qualification for Relegation play-off (Note: Darfo Boario remained in the league to fill the vacancies created.) |
| 16 | Seregno | 38 | 10 | 13 | 15 | 48 | 52 | −4 | 41 (Note: Seregno was docked 2 points due to unlawful employment of a player.) | Qualification for Relegation play-off |
| 17 | Colognese (R) | 38 | 9 | 13 | 16 | 35 | 55 | −20 | 40 (Note: Colognese 17th about the direct clashes.) | Qualification for Relegation play-off |
| 18 | Carpenedolo | 38 | 10 | 10 | 18 | 48 | 63 | −15 | 40 | Qualification for Relegation play-off |
| 19 | Fiorenzuola (R) | 38 | 8 | 9 | 21 | 41 | 64 | −23 | 33 | Relegation to Eccellenza |
| 20 | Gallaratese (R) | 38 | 4 | 11 | 23 | 22 | 56 | −34 | 23 | Relegation to Promozione |

Updated to match(es) played on 6 May 2012. Source:
Rules for classification: 1) points; 2) goal difference; 3) number of goals scored.
(C) Champions; (P) Promoted; (R) Relegated

=== Girone C ===
==== Teams ====
Teams from Veneto, Trentino-Alto Adige/Südtirol & Friuli-Venezia Giulia

| Club | City | Stadium | Capacity | 2010–11 season |
|---|---|---|---|---|
| Belluno | Belluno | Polisportivo | 2,585 | 14th in Serie D Girone C |
| Concordia | Concordia Sagittaria | Comunale | 600 | 16th in Serie D Girone C |
| Delta Porto Tolle | Porto Tolle | Comunale | 3,000 | 1st in Eccellenza Veneto Girone B (as Delta 2000) |
| Giorgione | Castelfranco Veneto | Comunale | 2,100 | 2nd in Eccellenza Veneto Girone B |
| I.S.M. Gradisca | Gradisca d'Isonzo | Gino Colaussi | 4,000 | 1st in Eccellenza Friuli-Venezia Giulia |
| Legnago Salus | Legnago | Mario Sandrini | 2,152 | 6th in Serie D Girone B |
| Mezzocorona | Mezzocorona (playing in Trento) | Briamasco | 4,277 | 17th in Lega Pro Seconda Divisione Girone A |
| Montebelluna | Montebelluna | San Vigilio | 2,000 | 13th in Serie D Girone C |
| Montecchio Maggiore | Montecchio Maggiore | Gino Corsaro | 1,000 | 12th in Serie D Girone C |
| Pordenone | Pordenone | Ottavio Bottecchia | 3,000 | 10th in Serie D Girone C |
| Sacilese | Sacile | XXV Aprile – Aldo Castenetto | 2,600 | 15th in Lega Pro Seconda Divisione Girone A |
| SandonàJesolo | San Donà di Piave | Verino Zanutto | 4,000 | 4th in Serie D Girone C |
| St. Georgen | Bruneck | Comunale | 3,200 | 1st in Eccellenza Trentino-Alto Adige |
| Sanvitese | San Vito al Tagliamento | Comunale | 2,500 | 9th in Serie D Girone C |
| Sarego | Sarego | Comunale | 1,000 | 1st in Eccellenza Veneto Girone A |
| Tamai | Brugnera | Comunale | 1,000 | 3rd in Serie D Girone C |
| Union Quinto | Quinto di Treviso | Omobono Tenni | 1,000 | 7th in Serie D Girone C |
| Venezia | Venice | Pier Luigi Penzo | 7,450 | 2nd in Serie D Girone C |

==== League table ====
| Pos | Team | Pld | W | D | L | GF | GA | GD | Pts | Promotion or relegation |
|---|---|---|---|---|---|---|---|---|---|---|
| 1 | Venezia (C, P) | 34 | 21 | 10 | 3 | 74 | 37 | +37 | 73 (Note: The score of U. Venezia-Montebelluna was transformed by sports judgment from 1–1 to 3–0 because Montebelluna has deployed the player Matteo Vigo who was disqualified.) | Promotion to Lega Pro Seconda Divisione (Note: U. Venezia wins Scudetto Dilettanti.) |
| 2 | Delta Porto Tolle | 34 | 20 | 7 | 7 | 66 | 35 | +31 | 67 | Qualification for Promotion play-off |
| 3 | Legnago Salus | 34 | 16 | 14 | 4 | 46 | 24 | +22 | 62 | Qualification for Promotion play-off |
| 4 | Montebelluna | 34 | 15 | 10 | 9 | 40 | 33 | +7 | 55 | Qualification for Promotion play-off |
| 5 | Sacilese | 34 | 13 | 11 | 10 | 40 | 34 | +6 | 50 | Qualification for Promotion play-off |
| 6 | SandonàJesolo | 34 | 12 | 12 | 10 | 49 | 34 | +15 | 48 (Note: SandonàJesolo 6th about the direct clashes.) | Qualification for Promotion play-off (Note: SandonàJesolo qualified for the fourth round of the Promotion play-off as the finalist of Coppa Italia Serie D 2011-12.) |
| 7 | Mezzocorona | 34 | 12 | 12 | 10 | 40 | 37 | +3 | 48 | |
| 8 | Pordenone | 34 | 12 | 12 | 10 | 47 | 38 | +9 | 48 | |
| 9 | Belluno | 34 | 11 | 12 | 11 | 41 | 44 | −3 | 45 | |
| 10 | Giorgione | 34 | 11 | 11 | 12 | 38 | 35 | +3 | 44 (Note: Giorgione 10th about the direct clashes.) | |
| 11 | Union Quinto | 34 | 12 | 8 | 14 | 42 | 52 | −10 | 44 | |
| 12 | Tamai | 34 | 11 | 11 | 12 | 52 | 54 | −2 | 44 | |
| 13 | St. Georgen | 34 | 10 | 12 | 12 | 39 | 54 | −15 | 42 | Qualification for Relegation play-off |
| 14 | Sanvitese | 34 | 8 | 11 | 15 | 31 | 48 | −17 | 35 (Note: Sanvitese 14th about the direct clashes.) | Qualification for Relegation play-off |
| 15 | Sarego (R) | 34 | 9 | 8 | 17 | 38 | 59 | −21 | 35 | Qualification for Relegation play-off |
| 16 | Montecchio Maggiore (R) | 34 | 8 | 10 | 16 | 34 | 43 | −9 | 34 | Qualification for Relegation play-off |
| 17 | Concordia (R) | 34 | 7 | 11 | 16 | 43 | 59 | −16 | 32 | Relegation to Eccellenza |
| 18 | Itala San Marco Gradisca (R) | 34 | 4 | 6 | 24 | 33 | 72 | −39 | 18 | Relegation to Eccellenza |

Updated to match(es) played on 6 May 2012. Source:
Rules for classification: 1) points; 2) goal difference; 3) number of goals scored.
(C) Champions; (P) Promoted; (R) Relegated

=== Girone D ===
==== Teams ====
Teams from Emilia-Romagna, Tuscany & Veneto

| Club | City | Stadium | Capacity | 2010–11 season |
|---|---|---|---|---|
| Bagnolese | Bagnolo in Piano | Fratelli Campari | 1,000 | 3rd in Serie D Girone D |
| Camaiore | Camaiore | Comunale | 3,000 | 6th in Serie D Girone D |
| Cerea | Cerea | Pelaloca | 2,000 | 2nd in Eccellenza Veneto Girone A |
| Este | Este | Nuovo Comunale | 1,200 | 6th in Serie D Girone C |
| Forcoli | Palaia | Guido Brunner | 3,000 | 7th in Serie D Girone D |
| Forlì | Forlì | Tullo Morgagni | 3,600 | 4th in Serie D Girone F |
| Lanciotto | Campi Bisenzio | Emil Zatopek | 2,000 | 1st in Eccellenza Tuscany Girone B |
| Mezzolara | Budrio | Pietro Zucchini | 1,300 | 5th in Serie D Girone D |
| Pelli Santacroce | Santa Croce sull'Arno | Libero Masini | 2,400 | 14th in Serie D Girone D (as Mobilieri Ponsacco) |
| Pistoiese | Pistoia | Marcello Melani | 13,195 | 1st in Eccellenza Tuscany Girone A |
| Ravenna | Ravenna | Bruno Benelli | 12,020 | 14th in Lega Pro Prima Divisione Girone A |
| Rosignano | Rosignano Marittimo | Ernesto Solvay | 1,400 | 9th in Serie D Girone D |
| San Miniato Tuttocuoio | San Miniato | Leporaia | 600 | 12th in Serie D Girone D |
| San Paolo Padova | Padua | Plebistico | 9,600 | 5th in Serie D Girone C |
| Scandicci | Scandicci | Turri | 1,800 | 8th in Serie D Girone E |
| Sestese | Sesto Fiorentino | Piero Torrini | 5,000 | 13th in Serie D Girone E |
| Villafranca | Villafranca di Verona | Comunale | 1,000 | 14th in Serie D Girone B |
| Virtus Castelfranco | Castelfranco Emilia | Fausto Ferrarini | 1,280 | 4th in Serie D Girone D |
| Virtus Pavullese | Pavullo nel Frignano | Giuseppe Minelli | 2,500 | 13th in Serie D Girone D |
| Virtus Verona | Verona | Gavagnin | 1,000 | 11th in Serie D Girone B |

==== League table ====
| Pos | Team | Pld | W | D | L | GF | GA | GD | Pts | Promotion or relegation |
|---|---|---|---|---|---|---|---|---|---|---|
| 1 | Forlì (C, P) | 38 | 24 | 8 | 6 | 72 | 45 | +27 | 80 | Lega Pro Seconda Divisione |
| 2 | Mezzolara | 38 | 22 | 9 | 7 | 62 | 41 | +21 | 75 (Note: Mezzolara 2nd about the direct clashes.) | Qualification for Promotion play-off |
| 3 | Este | 38 | 22 | 11 | 5 | 71 | 28 | +43 | 75 (Note: Este was docked 2 points due to unlawful employment of a player.) | Qualification for Promotion play-off |
| 4 | Virtus Castelfranco | 38 | 21 | 6 | 11 | 71 | 53 | +18 | 69 | Qualification for Promotion play-off |
| 5 | San Paolo Padova | 38 | 17 | 12 | 9 | 60 | 40 | +20 | 63 | Qualification for Promotion play-off |
| 6 | Virtus Verona | 38 | 16 | 13 | 9 | 62 | 46 | +16 | 61 | |
| 7 | Pistoiese | 38 | 14 | 12 | 12 | 65 | 50 | +15 | 54 | |
| 8 | Lanciotto | 38 | 13 | 14 | 11 | 45 | 44 | +1 | 53 | |
| 9 | Cerea | 38 | 14 | 11 | 13 | 57 | 58 | −1 | 53 | |
| 10 | San Miniato Tuttocuoio | 38 | 13 | 13 | 12 | 45 | 37 | +8 | 52 (Note: The score of Tuttocuoio-Ravenna was transformed by sports judgment from 1–1 to 3–0 because Ravenna has deployed the player Egbedi Morgan who had not been registered.) | |
| 11 | Bagnolese | 38 | 13 | 10 | 15 | 44 | 46 | −2 | 49 | |
| 12 | Rosignano | 38 | 11 | 13 | 14 | 41 | 53 | −12 | 46 | |
| 13 | Forcoli | 38 | 10 | 15 | 13 | 41 | 42 | −1 | 45 | |
| 14 | Camaiore | 38 | 11 | 11 | 16 | 45 | 61 | −16 | 44 (Note: Camaiore 14th about the direct clashes.) | |
| 15 | Scandicci | 38 | 10 | 14 | 14 | 46 | 55 | −9 | 44 | |
| 16 | Ravenna (R) | 38 | 10 | 12 | 16 | 40 | 49 | −9 | 39 (Note: Ravenna was docked 3 points due to financial irregularities.) | Relegation to Promozione |
| 17 | Virtus Pavullese | 38 | 8 | 13 | 17 | 36 | 55 | −19 | 37 | Qualification for Relegation play-off |
| 18 | Villafranca (R) | 38 | 8 | 11 | 19 | 39 | 61 | −22 | 35 | Relegation to Eccellenza |
| 19 | Pelli Santacroce (R) | 38 | 5 | 10 | 23 | 34 | 69 | −35 | 25 | Relegation to Eccellenza |
| 20 | Sestese (R) | 38 | 5 | 8 | 25 | 35 | 78 | −43 | 23 | Relegation to Eccellenza |

Updated to match(es) played on 6 May 2012. Source:
Rules for classification: 1) points; 2) goal difference; 3) number of goals scored.
(C) Champions; (P) Promoted; (R) Relegated

=== Girone E ===
==== Teams ====
Teams from Tuscany, Umbria & Lazio

| Club | City | Stadium | Capacity | 2010–11 season |
|---|---|---|---|---|
| Arezzo | Arezzo | Città di Arezzo | 15,128 | 9th in Serie D Girone E |
| Castel Rigone | Passignano sul Trasimeno | San Bartolomeo | 1,200 | 2nd in Serie D Girone E |
| Deruta | Deruta | Comunale | 600 | 16th in Serie D Girone E |
| Flaminia Civita Castellana | Civita Castellana | Turrido Madani | 1,300 | 7th in Serie D Girone E |
| Group Castello | Città di Castello | Comunale "Bernicchi" | 1,000 | 6th in Serie D Girone E |
| Orvietana | Orvieto | Luigi Muzi | 2,500 | 14th in Serie D Girone E |
| Pianese | Piancastagnaio | Comunale | 1,000 | 5th in Serie D Girone E |
| Pierantonio | Umbertide | Comunale "Morandi" | 2,200 | 1st in Eccellenza Umbria |
| Pontedera | Pontedera | Ettore Mannucci | 5,000 | 2nd in Serie D Girone D |
| Pontevecchio | Ponte San Giovanni | degli Ornari | 1,000 | 11th in Serie D Girone E |
| Sansepolcro | Sansepolcro | Giovanni Buitoni | 2,000 | 3rd in Serie D Girone E |
| Sansovino | Monte San Savino | Le Fonti | 2,500 | 2nd in Eccellenza Tuscany Girone B |
| Sporting Terni | Terni | Mirko Fabrizi | 1,070 | 10th in Serie D Girone E |
| Sporting Trestina | Trestina | Lorenzo Casini | 500 | 2nd in Eccellenza Umbria |
| Todi | Todi | Franco Martelli | 1,200 | 4th in Serie D Girone E |
| Viterbese | Viterbo | Enrico Rocchi | 6,000 | 6th in Serie D Girone G |
| Voluntas Spoleto | Spoleto | Comunale | 1,800 | 12th in Serie D Girone E |
| Zagarolo | Zagarolo | Elio Mastrangeli | 2,000 | 7th in Serie D Girone G |

==== League table ====
| Pos | Team | Pld | W | D | L | GF | GA | GD | Pts | Promotion or relegation |
|---|---|---|---|---|---|---|---|---|---|---|
| 1 | Pontedera (C, P) | 34 | 21 | 12 | 1 | 67 | 28 | +39 | 75 | Promotion to Lega Pro Seconda Divisione |
| 2 | Arezzo | 34 | 19 | 8 | 7 | 70 | 39 | +31 | 65 (Note: The score of Atl. Arezzo-Sansovino was transformed by sports judgment from 0–0 to 0–3 for infringement of the rule on under.) | Qualification for Promotion play-off |
| 3 | Pianese | 34 | 14 | 11 | 9 | 54 | 46 | +8 | 53 | Qualification for Promotion play-off |
| 4 | Castel Rigone | 34 | 15 | 5 | 14 | 55 | 42 | +13 | 50 (Note: Castel Rigone 4th about the direct clashes.) | Qualification for Promotion play-off |
| 5 | Sporting Terni | 34 | 13 | 11 | 10 | 50 | 50 | 0 | 50 | Qualification for Promotion play-off |
| 6 | Trestina | 34 | 10 | 17 | 7 | 37 | 37 | 0 | 47 (Note: Sporting Trestina 6th about the direct clashes.) | |
| 7 | Pierantonio | 34 | 13 | 8 | 13 | 47 | 51 | −4 | 47 | |
| 8 | Deruta | 34 | 10 | 16 | 8 | 36 | 36 | 0 | 46 (Note: Deruta 8th about the direct clashes.) | |
| 9 | Viterbese | 34 | 12 | 10 | 12 | 42 | 46 | −4 | 46 | |
| 10 | Voluntas Spoleto | 34 | 12 | 8 | 14 | 43 | 47 | −4 | 44 (Note: Voluntas Spoleto 10th about the direct clashes.) | |
| 11 | Todi | 34 | 10 | 14 | 10 | 31 | 30 | +1 | 44 | |
| 12 | Sansepolcro | 34 | 11 | 11 | 12 | 38 | 39 | −1 | 44 | |
| 13 | Flaminia Civita Castellana | 34 | 10 | 14 | 10 | 52 | 41 | +11 | 44 | |
| 14 | Orvietana (R) | 34 | 10 | 10 | 14 | 47 | 52 | −5 | 40 | Qualification for Relegation play-off |
| 15 | Pontevecchio | 34 | 10 | 7 | 17 | 35 | 50 | −15 | 37 | Qualification for Relegation play-off |
| 16 | Zagarolo (R) | 34 | 10 | 4 | 20 | 47 | 71 | −24 | 34 | Excluded from italian football after bankruptcy |
| 17 | Group Castello (R) | 34 | 8 | 7 | 19 | 34 | 61 | −27 | 31 | Relegation to Terza Categoria |
| 18 | Sansovino (R) | 34 | 7 | 9 | 18 | 33 | 52 | −19 | 26 (Note: Sansovino was docked 4 points because it has deployed the player Luca Pietrobattista who was disqualified.) | Relegation to Terza Categoria |

Updated to match(es) played on 6 May 2012. Source:
Rules for classification: 1) points; 2) goal difference; 3) number of goals scored.
(C) Champions; (P) Promoted; (R) Relegated

=== Girone F ===
==== Teams ====
Teams from Emilia-Romagna, Marche, Abruzzo & Molise

| Club | City | Stadium | Capacity | 2010–11 season |
|---|---|---|---|---|
| Ancona 1905 | Ancona | Conero | 26,000 | 1st in Eccellenza Marche |
| Atessa V.d.S. | Atessa | Monte Marcone | 2,000 | 11th in Serie D Girone F |
| Atletico Trivento | Trivento | Comunale | 1,000 | 11th in Serie D Girone F |
| Civitanovese | Civitanova Marche | Comunale | 4,000 | 10th in Serie D Girone F |
| Isernia | Isernia | Mario Lancellotta | 5,000 | 1st in Eccellenza Molise |
| Jesina | Jesi | Pacifico Carotti | 5,000 | 5th in Serie D Girone F |
| Luco Canistro | Canistro | Comunale | 600 | 13th in Serie D Girone F |
| Miglianico | Miglianico | Fratelli Ciavatta | 600 | 18th in Serie D Girone F |
| Olympia Agnonese | Agnone | Civitelle | 4,000 | 14th in Serie D Girone F |
| Real Rimini | Rimini | Romeo Neri | 9,768 | 9th in Serie D Girone F |
| Recanatese | Recanati | Nicola Tubaldi | 2,000 | 8th in Serie D Girone F |
| R.C. Angolana | Città Sant'Angelo | Comunale | 4,120 | 6th in Serie D Girone F |
| Riccione | Riccione | Italo Niccoletti | 7,000 | 1st in Eccellenza Emilia-Romagna Girone B |
| Sambenedettese | San Benedetto del Tronto | Riviera delle Palme | 7,494 | 12th in Serie D Girone F |
| San Nicolò | San Nicolò a Tordino (playing in Teramo) | Comunale | 7,498 | 1st in Eccellenza Abruzzo |
| Santegidiese | Sant'Egidio alla Vibrata | Comunale | 2,000 | 7th in Serie D Girone F |
| Teramo | Teramo | Comunale | 7,498 | 2nd in Serie D Girone F |
| Vis Pesaro | Pesaro | Tonino Benelli | 4,050 | 5th in Eccellenza Marche |

==== League table ====
| Pos | Team | Pld | W | D | L | GF | GA | GD | Pts | Promotion or relegation |
|---|---|---|---|---|---|---|---|---|---|---|
| 1 | Teramo (C, P) | 34 | 22 | 7 | 5 | 86 | 29 | +57 | 73 | Promotion to Lega Pro Seconda Divisione |
| 2 | Sambenedettese | 34 | 20 | 12 | 2 | 57 | 31 | +26 | 72 | Qualification for Promotion play-off |
| 3 | Ancona 1905 | 34 | 21 | 9 | 4 | 66 | 29 | +37 | 72 | Qualification for Promotion play-off |
| 4 | Civitanovese | 34 | 19 | 11 | 4 | 60 | 33 | +27 | 68 | Qualification for Promotion play-off |
| 5 | Isernia | 34 | 17 | 9 | 8 | 46 | 35 | +11 | 60 (Note: The score of Isernia-Luco Canistro was transformed by sports judgment from 1–1 to 3–0 because Luco Canistro has deployed the player Saverio Pedalino who had been registered only the day of the match.) | Qualification for Promotion play-off |
| 6 | Atletico Trivento (R) | 34 | 18 | 5 | 11 | 60 | 46 | +14 | 59 | Excluded from italian football after the non-admission of the Federal Council |
| 7 | San Nicolò | 34 | 13 | 11 | 10 | 43 | 40 | +3 | 50 | |
| 8 | Jesina | 34 | 12 | 12 | 10 | 48 | 33 | +15 | 48 (Note: Jesina 8th about the direct clashes.) | |
| 9 | Olympia Agnonese | 34 | 14 | 6 | 14 | 65 | 56 | +9 | 48 | |
| 10 | Recanatese | 34 | 11 | 12 | 11 | 42 | 39 | +3 | 45 | |
| 11 | Vis Pesaro | 34 | 12 | 8 | 14 | 45 | 47 | −2 | 44 | |
| 12 | Atessa V.d.S. (R) | 34 | 10 | 9 | 15 | 40 | 49 | −9 | 39 (Note: Atessa V.d.S. 12th about the direct clashes.) | Relegation to Allievi Regionali |
| 13 | Riccione | 34 | 11 | 6 | 17 | 52 | 56 | −4 | 39 | |
| 14 | R.C. Angolana | 34 | 9 | 11 | 14 | 37 | 47 | −10 | 38 | Qualification for Relegation play-off |
| 15 | Santegidiese (R) | 34 | 10 | 6 | 18 | 48 | 62 | −14 | 36 | Qualification for Relegation play-off |
| 16 | Miglianico (R) | 34 | 5 | 11 | 18 | 34 | 57 | −23 | 26 | Relegation to Eccellenza |
| 17 | Luco Canistro (R) | 34 | 5 | 4 | 25 | 22 | 71 | −49 | 19 | Excluded from italian football after liquidation |
| 18 | Real Rimini (R) | 34 | 0 | 5 | 29 | 16 | 107 | −91 | 5 | Relegation to Eccellenza |

Updated to match(es) played on 6 May 2012. Source:
Rules for classification: 1) points; 2) goal difference; 3) number of goals scored.
(C) Champions; (P) Promoted; (R) Relegated

=== Girone G ===
==== Teams ====
Teams from Campania, Lazio & Sardinia

| Club | City | Stadium | Capacity | 2010–11 season |
|---|---|---|---|---|
| Anziolavinio | Anzio | Massimo Bruschini | 3,000 | 10th in Serie D Girone G |
| Arzachena | Arzachena | Biagio Pirina | 2,400 | 11th in Serie D Girone G |
| Astrea | Rome | Casal del Marmo | 2,500 | 14th in Serie D Girone G |
| Atletico Boville | Boville Ernica | Montorli | 1,500 | 10th in Serie D Girone H (as Boville Ernica) |
| Bacoli Sibilla | Bacoli | Tony Chiovato | 1,720 | 2nd in Serie D Girone G |
| Budoni | Budoni | Comunale | 1,500 | 8th in Serie D Girone G |
| Civitavecchia | Civitavecchia | Giovanni Maria Fattori | 3,000 | 2nd in Eccellenza Lazio Girone A |
| Cynthia | Genzano di Roma | Comunale | 6,000 | 13th in Serie D Girone G |
| Fidene | Rome | Walter Cervini | 2,000 | 4th in Serie D Girone G |
| Marino | Marino | Comunale Domenico Fiore | 3,000 | 8th in Eccellenza Lazio Girone B |
| Monterotondo Lupa | Monterotondo (playing in Rome) | Carlo Panichelli | 2,500 | 3rd in Serie D Girone G (as Monterotondo) |
| Palestrina | Palestrina | Comunale | 1,300 | 1st in Eccellenza Lazio Girone A |
| Pomigliano | Pomigliano d'Arco | Ugo Gobbato | 2,500 | 2nd in Serie D Girone H |
| Porto Torres | Porto Torres | Comunale | 5,000 | 9th in Serie D Girone G |
| Progetto Sant'Elia | Cagliari | Campo Comunale Sant'Elia | 300 | 1st in Eccellenza Sardinia |
| Salerno | Salerno | Arechi | 39,989 | 4th in Lega Pro Prima Divisione Girone A (as Salernitana) |
| Selargius | Selargius | Generale Porcu | 2,000 | 12th in Serie D Girone G |
| Sora | Sora | Claudio Tomei | 6,500 | 1st in Eccellenza Lazio Girone B |

==== League table ====
| Pos | Team | Pld | W | D | L | GF | GA | GD | Pts | Promotion or relegation |
|---|---|---|---|---|---|---|---|---|---|---|
| 1 | Salerno (C, P) | 34 | 19 | 11 | 4 | 61 | 32 | +29 | 68 (Note: The score of Bacoli Sibilla-Salerno, suspended on the result of 0–2 because Bacoli S. was left with only six players, was transformed by sports judgment to 0–3.) | Promotion to Lega Pro Seconda Divisione |
| 2 | Marino | 34 | 18 | 10 | 6 | 59 | 35 | +24 | 64 | Qualification for Promotion play-off |
| 3 | Pomigliano | 34 | 14 | 11 | 9 | 40 | 33 | +7 | 53 | Qualification for Promotion play-off |
| 4 | Fidene | 31 | 14 | 10 | 7 | 51 | 46 | +5 | 52 | Qualification for Promotion play-off |
| 5 | Budoni | 34 | 11 | 18 | 5 | 39 | 32 | +7 | 51 (Note: Budoni 5th about the direct clashes with Porto Torres and so qualified for the promotion playoffs.) | Qualification for Promotion play-off |
| 6 | Porto Torres | 34 | 14 | 9 | 11 | 46 | 45 | +1 | 51 | |
| 7 | Astrea | 34 | 11 | 17 | 6 | 50 | 41 | +9 | 50 | |
| 8 | Arzachena | 34 | 11 | 14 | 9 | 42 | 35 | +7 | 47 | |
| 9 | Anziolavinio | 34 | 12 | 9 | 13 | 53 | 53 | 0 | 45 (Note: Anziolavinio 9th about the direct clashes.) | |
| 10 | Civitavecchia | 34 | 11 | 12 | 11 | 43 | 36 | +7 | 45 | |
| 11 | Selargius | 34 | 11 | 10 | 13 | 49 | 50 | −1 | 43 | |
| 12 | Sora | 34 | 10 | 12 | 12 | 24 | 27 | −3 | 42 | |
| 13 | Palestrina (R) | 34 | 10 | 11 | 13 | 41 | 45 | −4 | 41 | Excluded from italian football after transfer sports title (Note: Palestrina gives its sports title to San Basilio Palestrina and it is dissolved in summer 2012.) |
| 14 | Monterotondo Lupa (R) | 34 | 10 | 10 | 14 | 33 | 37 | −4 | 40 | Qualification for Relegation play-off |
| 15 | Progetto Sant'Elia | 34 | 9 | 7 | 18 | 44 | 55 | −11 | 34 | Qualification for Relegation play-off |
| 16 | Cynthia | 34 | 6 | 15 | 13 | 36 | 47 | −11 | 33 | Qualification for Relegation play-off (Note: Cynthia remained in the league to fill the vacancies created.) |
| 17 | Bacoli Sibilla (R) | 34 | 7 | 10 | 17 | 30 | 49 | −19 | 31 | Relegation to Eccellenza |
| 18 | Atletico Boville (R) | 34 | 7 | 6 | 21 | 26 | 69 | −43 | 27 | Relegation to Eccellenza |

Updated to match(es) played on 6 May 2012. Source:
Rules for classification: 1) points; 2) goal difference; 3) number of goals scored.
(C) Champions; (P) Promoted; (R) Relegated

=== Girone H ===
==== Teams ====
Teams from Campania, Apulia, Lazio & Basilicata

| Club | City | Stadium | Capacity | 2010–11 season |
|---|---|---|---|---|
| Angelo Cristofaro | Oppido Lucano | Comunale | 300 | 1st in Eccellenza Basilicata |
| Brindisi | Brindisi | Franco Fanuzzi | 7,600 | 13th in Lega Pro Seconda Divisione Girone C |
| Campania | Piscinola (Naples) | Dietro La Vigna | 300 | 1st in Eccellenza Campania Girone A |
| Casertana | Caserta | Alberto Pinto | 12,000 | 3rd in Serie D Girone I |
| Fortis Trani | Trani | Comunale | 10,700 | 11th in Serie D Girone H |
| Francavilla | Francavilla in Sinni | Nunzio Fittipaldi | 1,200 | 6th in Serie D Girone H |
| Gaeta | Gaeta | Antonio Riciniello | 2,000 | 3rd in Serie D Girone H |
| Grottaglie | Grottaglie | D'Amuri | 1,200 | 12th in Serie D Girone H |
| Internapoli | Marano di Napoli | Salvatore Nuvoletta | 12,000 | 3rd in Eccellenza Campania Girone A |
| Irsinese | Irsina (playing in Matera) | XXI Settembre-Franco Salerno | 8,500 | 9th in Serie D Girone H (as Fortis Murgia Irsina) |
| Ischia | Ischia | Vincenzo Mazzella | 5,000 | 7th in Serie D Girone H |
| Martina Franca | Martina Franca | Gian Domenico Tursi | 5,000 | 1st in Eccellenza Apulia |
| Nardò | Nardò | Giovanni Paolo II | 5,000 | 4th in Serie D Girone H |
| Real Nocera | Nocera Superiore | Karol Wojtyla | 1,200 | 11th in Serie D Girone I |
| Sarnese | Sarno | Felice Squitieri | 7,000 | 3rd in Eccellenza Campania Girone B |
| Turris | Torre del Greco | Amerigo Liguori | 4,000 | 5th in Serie D Girone I |
| Viribus Unitis | Somma Vesuviana | Felice Nappi | 2,500 | 5th in Serie D Girone G |
| Virtus Casarano | Casarano | Giuseppe Capozza | 6,200 | 5th in Serie D Girone H |

==== League table ====
| Pos | Team | Pld | W | D | L | GF | GA | GD | Pts | Promotion or relegation |
|---|---|---|---|---|---|---|---|---|---|---|
| 1 | Martina Franca (C, P) | 34 | 21 | 9 | 4 | 61 | 23 | +38 | 72 | Promotion to Lega Pro Seconda Divisione |
| 2 | Sarnese | 34 | 22 | 5 | 7 | 69 | 29 | +40 | 71 | Qualification for Promotion play-off |
| 3 | Ischia | 34 | 19 | 9 | 6 | 66 | 38 | +28 | 66 | Qualification for Promotion play-off |
| 4 | Casertana | 34 | 19 | 8 | 7 | 65 | 34 | +31 | 65 | Qualification for Promotion play-off |
| 5 | Brindisi | 34 | 17 | 8 | 9 | 59 | 42 | +17 | 59 | Qualification for Promotion play-off |
| 6 | Turris (R) | 34 | 15 | 12 | 7 | 63 | 41 | +22 | 57 | Excluded from Italian football after transfer sports title (Note: Turris gives its sports title to Real Hyria Nola and it is dissolved in summer 2012.) |
| 7 | Francavilla | 34 | 14 | 14 | 6 | 48 | 39 | +9 | 56 | |
| 8 | Campania | 34 | 14 | 10 | 10 | 31 | 26 | +5 | 52 | |
| 9 | Virtus Casarano (R) | 34 | 11 | 12 | 11 | 40 | 31 | +9 | 45 | Relegation to Promozione |
| 10 | Nardò | 34 | 11 | 10 | 13 | 30 | 43 | −13 | 43 | |
| 11 | Fortis Trani | 34 | 11 | 8 | 15 | 46 | 52 | −6 | 41 | |
| 12 | Internapoli | 34 | 8 | 13 | 13 | 31 | 46 | −15 | 37 | |
| 13 | Irsinese (R) | 34 | 9 | 9 | 16 | 40 | 52 | −12 | 36 | Excluded from Italian football after transfer sports title (Note: Irsinese gives its sports title to Matera and it is dissolved in summer 2012.) |
| 14 | Grottaglie | 34 | 8 | 11 | 15 | 35 | 52 | −17 | 35 | Qualification for Relegation play-off |
| 15 | Real Nocera (R) | 34 | 6 | 9 | 19 | 32 | 56 | −24 | 27 (Note: The score of the tie-break between Viribus Unitis-Real Nocera was 1-2: the winner Real Nocera was qualified for the relegation playout and the loser Viribus was relegated to Eccellenza.) | Qualification for Relegation play-off |
| 16 | Viribus Unitis (R) | 34 | 6 | 9 | 19 | 29 | 61 | −32 | 27 | Relegation to Eccellenza |
| 17 | Angelo Cristofaro (R) | 34 | 5 | 8 | 21 | 30 | 61 | −31 | 23 | Relegation to Eccellenza |
| 18 | Gaeta (R) | 34 | 7 | 2 | 25 | 23 | 72 | −49 | 19 (Note: Gaeta was docked 4 points due to financial irregularities.) | Relegation to Eccellenza |

Updated to match(es) played on 6 May 2012. Source:
Rules for classification: 1) points; 2) goal difference; 3) number of goals scored.
(C) Champions; (P) Promoted; (R) Relegated

=== Girone I ===
==== Teams ====
Teams from Campania, Calabria, & Sicily

| Club | City | Stadium | Capacity | 2010–11 season |
|---|---|---|---|---|
| Acireale | Acireale | Tupparello | 8,000 | 13th in Serie D Girone I |
| Acri | Acri | Pasquale Castrovillari | 4,000 | 1st in Eccellenza Calabria |
| Adrano | Adrano | dell'Etna | 5,000 | 3rd in Eccellenza Sicily Girone B |
| Battipagliese | Battipaglia | Luigi Pastena | 13,000 | 14th in Serie D Girone H |
| Cittanova Interpiana | Cittanova | Proto-Morreale | 3,000 | 12th in Serie D Girone I |
| Cosenza | Cosenza | San Vito | 24,000 | 14th in Lega Pro Prima Divisione Girone B |
| Gelbison Cilento | Vallo della Lucania | G. Morra | 4,000 | 1st in Eccellenza Campania Girone B (as Serre Alburni) |
| HinterReggio | Reggio Calabria | Comunale Rione Ravagnese | 1,200 | 8th in Serie D Girone I |
| Licata | Licata | Dino Liotta | 8,000 | 1st in Eccellenza Sicily Girone A |
| Marsala | Marsala | Antonino Lombardo Angotta | 13,500 | 15th in Serie D Girone I |
| Messina | Messina | San Filippo | 40,200 | 9th in Serie D Girone I |
| Nissa | Caltanissetta | Marco Tomaselli | 15,000 | 6th in Serie D Girone I |
| Noto | Noto | Polisportivo Palatucci | 5,000 | 14th in Serie D Girone I |
| Nuvla San Felice | Nola | Sporting Club | 1,500 | 19th in Serie D Girone I (as Atletico Nola) |
| Palazzolo | Palazzolo Acreide | Alessandro Scrofani Salustro | 1,300 | 1st in Eccellenza Sicily Girone B |
| Sambiase | Lamezia Terme | Guido D'Ippolito | 2,000 | 4th in Serie D Girone I |
| Sant'Antonio Abate | Sant'Antonio Abate | Comunale | 1,900 | 13th in Serie D Girone H |
| Valle Grecanica | Melito di Porto Salvo | Saverio Spinella | 1,100 | 7th in Serie D Girone I |

==== League table ====
| Pos | Team | Pld | W | D | L | GF | GA | GD | Pts | Promotion or relegation |
|---|---|---|---|---|---|---|---|---|---|---|
| 1 | HinterReggio (C, P) | 34 | 17 | 9 | 8 | 58 | 34 | +24 | 60 | Promotion to Lega Pro Seconda Divisione |
| 2 | Cosenza (O) | 34 | 16 | 11 | 7 | 56 | 35 | +21 | 59 | Qualification for Promotion play-off (Note: Cosenza wins playoffs, but not being automatically promoted must remain so even in Serie D.) |
| 3 | Battipagliese | 34 | 15 | 11 | 8 | 56 | 41 | +15 | 56 (Note: The score of Battipagliese-Acireale has become 3-0 by sports judgment for strict liability of Acireale for violent acts committed by their supporters.) (Note: The score of Battipagliese-Valle Grecanica has become 3-0 by sports judgment for no-show of Valle Grecanica.) (Note: Battipagliese 3rd about the direct clashes.) | Qualification for Promotion play-off |
| 4 | Messina | 34 | 16 | 11 | 7 | 50 | 36 | +14 | 56 (Note: Messina was docked 3 points due to financial irregularities.) | Qualification for Promotion play-off |
| 5 | Palazzolo A.S.D. | 34 | 14 | 11 | 9 | 50 | 30 | +20 | 53 (Note: The score of Palazzolo-Nuvla San Felice has become 3-0 by sports judgment for no-show of Nuvla San Felice.) | Qualification for Promotion play-off |
| 6 | Nuvla San Felice (R) | 34 | 14 | 8 | 12 | 43 | 40 | +3 | 49 (Note: The score of Sant'Antonio Abate-Nuvla San Felice was initially transformed by sports judgment from 1–2 to 3–0 for irregularities in the transfer of 14 players of Nuvla S.Felice. The Federal Court of Justice has restored instead the result of 1-2.) (Note: Cittanova, Nuvla San Felice and Valle Grecanica were docked 1 point due to not having played a game.) | Excluded from italian football after transfer sports title (Note: Nuvla San Felice gives his sports title to Gladiator and it is dissolved in summer 2012.) |
| 7 | Noto | 34 | 13 | 9 | 12 | 50 | 39 | +11 | 48 | |
| 8 | Licata | 34 | 12 | 11 | 11 | 51 | 49 | +2 | 47 (Note: Licata 8th about the direct clashes.) | |
| 9 | Adrano (R) | 34 | 12 | 11 | 11 | 43 | 46 | −3 | 47 | Excluded from italian football after transfer sports title (Note: Adrano gives his sports title to Comprensorio Normanno and it is dissolved in summer 2012.) |
| 10 | Sambiase | 34 | 11 | 12 | 11 | 41 | 44 | −3 | 45 (Note: Sambiase 10th about the direct clashes.) | |
| 11 | Sant'Antonio Abate | 34 | 12 | 11 | 11 | 54 | 53 | +1 | 45 (Note: Sant'Antonio Abate was docked 2 points due to financial irregularities.) | Qualification for Promotion play-off (Note: Sant'Antonio Abate qualified for the Semifinals of the Promotion play-off as winner of Coppa Italia Serie D 2011-12.) |
| 12 | Gelbison Cilento | 34 | 10 | 15 | 9 | 36 | 36 | 0 | 45 | |
| 13 | Acri (R) | 34 | 12 | 7 | 15 | 40 | 43 | −3 | 43 (Note: The score of Acri-Marsala was transformed by sports judgment from 1–1 to 3–0 for the irregular position in this match of the Marsala's player Marco Pergolizzi which had refused to convene two days before of the meeting of "Rappresentativa Serie D" because influenced.) (Note: The score of Adri-Cittanova has become 3-0 by sports judgment for no-show of Cittanova.) | Qualification for Relegation play-off |
| 14 | Acireale | 34 | 10 | 12 | 12 | 30 | 35 | −5 | 42 | Qualification for Relegation play-off |
| 15 | Marsala (R) | 34 | 9 | 11 | 14 | 34 | 44 | −10 | 38 | Qualification for Relegation play-off |
| 16 | Nissa | 34 | 9 | 9 | 16 | 30 | 37 | −7 | 36 | Qualification for Relegation play-off |
| 17 | Valle Grecanica (R) | 34 | 6 | 12 | 16 | 29 | 50 | −21 | 29 | Relegation to Eccellenza |
| 18 | Cittanova Interpiana (R) | 34 | 5 | 5 | 24 | 20 | 79 | −59 | 19 | Relegation to Eccellenza |

Updated to match(es) played on 6 May 2012. Source:
Rules for classification: 1) points; 2) goal difference; 3) number of goals scored.
(C) Champions; (O) Play-off winners; (P) Promoted; (R) Relegated

== Divisions ==
=== Champions of winter and Promotions ===
All teams promoted to Lega Pro Seconda Divisione 2012–13.

| Division | Champions of winter | Promotions |
|---|---|---|
| A | V.d.A. Saint-Christophe | V.d.A. Saint-Christophe |
| B | Sterilgarda Castiglione | Sterilgarda Castiglione |
| C | Venezia | Venezia |
| D | Este | Forlì |
| E | Pontedera | Pontedera |
| F | Teramo | Teramo |
| G | Salerno | Salerno |
| H | Ischia | Martina Franca |
| I | HinterReggio | HinterReggio |

== Scudetto Dilettanti ==
=== First round ===
- division winners placed into 3 groups of 3
- group winners and best second-placed team qualify for semi-finals

==== Group 1 ====
| Pos | Team | Pld | W | D | L | GF | GA | GD | Pts |
|---|---|---|---|---|---|---|---|---|---|
| 1 | Venezia (C) | 2 | 2 | 0 | 0 | 7 | 0 | +7 | 6 |
| 2 | V.d.A. Saint-Christophe (A) | 2 | 0 | 1 | 1 | 0 | 3 | −3 | 1 |
| 3 | Sterilgarda Castiglione (B) | 2 | 0 | 1 | 1 | 0 | 4 | −4 | 1 |

| V.d.A. Saint-Christophe (A) | 0–0 | (B) Sterilgarda Castiglione | played on May 13, 2012 |
| Venezia (C) | 3–0 | (A) V.d.A. Saint-Christophe | played on May 16, 2012 |
| Sterilgarda Castiglione (B) | 0–4 | (C) Venezia | played on May 20, 2012 |

==== Group 2 ====
| Pos | Team | Pld | W | D | L | GF | GA | GD | Pts |
|---|---|---|---|---|---|---|---|---|---|
| 1 | Teramo (F) | 2 | 2 | 0 | 0 | 6 | 3 | +3 | 6 |
| 2 | Forlì (D) | 2 | 1 | 0 | 1 | 6 | 6 | 0 | 3 |
| 3 | Pontedera (E) | 2 | 0 | 0 | 2 | 4 | 7 | −3 | 0 |

| Forlì (D) | 2–3 | (F)Teramo | played on May 13, 2012 |
| Pontedera (E) | 3–4 | (D) Forlì | played on May 16, 2012 |
| Teramo (F) | 3–1 | (E) Pontedera | played on May 20, 2012 |

==== Group 3 ====
| Pos | Team | Pld | W | D | L | GF | GA | GD | Pts |
|---|---|---|---|---|---|---|---|---|---|
| 1 | Salerno (G) | 2 | 1 | 1 | 0 | 4 | 1 | +3 | 4 |
| 2 | Martina Franca (H) | 2 | 1 | 1 | 0 | 4 | 3 | +1 | 4 |
| 3 | HinterReggio (I) | 2 | 0 | 0 | 2 | 4 | 8 | −4 | 0 |

| Martina Franca (H) | 0–0 | (G) Salerno | played on May 13, 2012 |
| HinterReggio (I) | 3–4 | (H) Martina Franca | played on May 16, 2012 |
| Salerno (G) | 4–1 | (I) HinterReggio | played on May 20, 2012 |

=== Semi-finals ===
One leg played on May 24, 2012

Games ending in a tie are extended to the penalty kicks without play extra time

- On neutral ground at Città di Castello, Stadio Comunale "Bernicchi"

| Team 1 | Score | Team 2 |
|---|---|---|
| Venezia (C) | 1-1(pen 5-2) | (H) Martina Franca |

- On neutral ground at Umbertide, Stadio Comunale "Morandi"

| Team 1 | Score | Team 2 |
|---|---|---|
| Teramo (F) | 1-1(pen 5-3) | (G) Salerno |

=== Final ===
Played on May 26, 2012

- Game ending in a tie are extended to the penalty kicks without play extra time
- On neutral ground at Gubbio, Stadio Pietro Barbetti

| Team 1 | Score | Team 2 |
|---|---|---|
| Venezia (C) | 3-2 | (F) Teramo |

Winner: Venezia

== Tie-break ==
- Before the relegation playoff could begin, one tie-break needed to be played.

Girone H - 16th-17th place - Played on May 13, 2012

| Team 1 | Score | Team 2 |
|---|---|---|
| Viribus Unitis | 1-2 | Real Nocera |

Real Nocera qualified for the relegation playoff and Viribus Unitis relegated to Eccellenza.

== Promotion playoffs ==
Promotion playoffs involved a total of 39 teams; four from each of the nine Serie D divisions (teams placed from 2nd through to 5th) with the best semifinalist, the finalist and the winner of Coppa Italia Serie D that are directly respectively admitted to the third, fourth round and the Semi-final.

=== Rules ===
==== First and second round ====
- The first two rounds were one-legged matches played in the home field of the best-placed team.
- The games ending in ties were extended to extra time. The higher classified team was declared the winner if the game was still tied after extra time. Penalty kicks were not taken.
- Round one matched 2nd & 5th-placed teams and 3rd & 4th-placed teams within each division.
- The two winners from each division played each other in the second round.

==== Third and fourth round ====
- The nine winners – one each from the nine Serie D divisions – were qualified with Bogliasco, as the best semifinalist of Coppa Italia Serie D to the third round, that was played in one-legged match in the home field of the best-placed team.
- The five winners were qualified with SandonàJesolo, as finalist of Coppa Italia Serie D to the fourth round, that was played in one-legged match in the home field of the best-placed team.
- The games ending in ties were extended to the penalty kicks, without play extra time.

==== Semi-finals and final ====
- The three 4th-round winners were qualified for the semifinal round, join with Sant'Antonio Abate, as Coppa Italia Serie D winner.
- The semi-finals and the final, with the respective winners, were in a one-legged hosted in a neutral ground.
- The games ending in ties were extended to the penalty kicks, without play extra time.

==== Repechages ====
- The tournament results provided a list, starting with the winner, by which vacancies could be filled in Lega Pro Seconda Divisione.
- If the winner is not admitted in this league gets 30 000 €, the finalist instead 15 000 €.

=== First round ===
- Played on May 13, 2012
- Single-legged matches played at best placed club home field: 2nd-placed team plays home 5th-placed team, 3rd-placed team plays home 4th placed team
- Games ending in a tie are extended to extra time, if still tied, the higher-classified team wins

| Team 1 | Score | Team 2 |
|---|---|---|
| Chieri (A2) | 0-1 | (A5) Lavagnese |
| Santhià (A3) | 4-1 | (A4) Novese |
| Pontisola (B2) | 1-0 | (B5) MapelloBonate |
| Olginatese (B3) | 4-2(aet) | (B4) Pizzighettone |
| Delta Porto Tolle (C2) | 1-0 | (C5) Sacilese |
| Legnago Salus (C3) | 2-1 | (C4) Montebelluna |
| Mezzolara (D2) | 2-1(aet) | (D5) San Paolo Padova |
| Este (D3) | 2-1 | (D4) Virtus Castelfranco |
| Arezzo (E2) | 2-1 | (E5) Sporting Terni |
| Pianese (E3) | 3-6(aet) | (E4) Castel Rigone |
| Sambenedettese (F2) | 2-1 | (F5) Isernia |
| Ancona 1905 (F3) | 4-3 | (F4) Civitanovese |
| Marino (G2) | 4-1 | (G5) Budoni |
| Pomigliano (G3) | 2-1 | (G4) Fidene |
| Sarnese (H2) | 3-1 | (H5) Brindisi |
| Ischia (H3) | 0-4 | (H4) Casertana |
| Cosenza (I2) | 3-1 | (I5) Palazzolo |
| Battipagliese (I3) | 1-3 | (I4) Messina |

=== Second round ===
- Played on May 16, 2012
- Single-legged matches played at best placed club home field
- Games ending in a tie are extended to extra time, if still tied, the higher-classified team wins

| Team 1 | Score | Team 2 |
|---|---|---|
| Santhià (A3) | 0-4 | (A5) Lavagnese |
| Pontisola (B2) | 1-0 | (B3) Olginatese |
| Delta Porto Tolle (C2) | 1-2 | (C3) Legnago Salus |
| Mezzolara (D2) | 0-2 | (D3) Este |
| Arezzo (E2) | 3-2 | (E4) Castel Rigone |
| Sambenedettese (F2) | 1-0 | (F3) Ancona 1905 |
| Marino (G2) | 1-2(aet) | (G3) Pomigliano |
| Sarnese (H2) | 2-0 | (H4) Casertana |
| Cosenza (I2) | 3-0 | (I4) Messina |

=== Third round ===
- Played on May 20, 2012
- Single-legged matches played at best placed club home field
- Games ending in a tie are extended to the penalty kicks without play extra time
- Bogliasco qualified directly as best semifinalist of Coppa Italia Serie D

| Team 1 | Score | Team 2 |
|---|---|---|
| Pontisola (B2) | 0-1 | (C3) Legnago Salus |
| Sambenedettese (F2) | 1-0 | (D3) Este |
| Arezzo (E2) | 2-0 | (S C) Bogliasco |
| Sarnese (H2) | 1-1(pen. 5-6) | (A5) Lavagnese |
| Cosenza (I2) | 3-0 | (G3) Pomigliano |

=== Fourth round ===
- Played on May 27, 2012
- Single-legged matches played at best placed club home field
- Games ending in a tie are extended to the penalty kicks without play extra time
- SandonàJesolo qualified directly as finalist of Coppa Italia Serie D

| Team 1 | Score | Team 2 |
|---|---|---|
| Sambenedettese (F2) | 1-1(pen. 4-5) | (C3) Legnago Salus |
| Arezzo (E2) | 0-0(pen. 3-4) | (F C) SandonàJesolo |
| Cosenza (I2) | 1-0 | (A5) Lavagnese |

=== Semi-finals ===
- One leg played on June 3, 2012
- Games ending in a tie are extended to the penalty kicks without play extra time
- Sant'Antonio Abate qualified directly as winner of Coppa Italia Serie D

On neutral ground at Belluno, Stadio "Polisportivo Comunale"

| Team 1 | Score | Team 2 |
|---|---|---|
| (C3) Legnago Salus | 0-2 | (F C) SandonàJesolo |

On neutral ground at Matera, Stadio "XXI Settembre - Franco Salerno"

| Team 1 | Score | Team 2 |
|---|---|---|
| Cosenza (I2) | 4-4(pen. 9-8) | (W C) Sant'Antonio Abate |

=== Final ===
- Played on June 10, 2012
- On neutral ground
- If the game ending in a tie is extended to the penalty kicks without play extra time

On neutral ground at Arezzo, Stadio Città di Arezzo

| Team 1 | Score | Team 2 |
|---|---|---|
| SandonàJesolo (F C) | 2-3 | (I2) Cosenza |

Winner: Cosenza

== Relegation playoffs ==
Played on May 20 & May 27, 2012
In case of aggregate tie score, higher classified team that plays the 2nd match in home wins, without extra time being played
Team highlighted in green is saved, other is relegated to Eccellenza

| Team 1 | Agg. | Team 2 | 1st leg | 2nd leg |
|---|---|---|---|---|
| (B) Carpenedolo | 3-2 | Darfo Boario | 2-1 | 1-1 |
| (B) Colognese | 0-1 | Seregno | 0-0 | 0-1 |
| (C) Montecchio Maggiore | 5-6 | St. Georgen | 3-2 | 2-4 |
| (C) Sarego | 1-1 | Sanvitese (saved for best placed) | 0-1 | 1-0 |
| (D) Virtus Pavullese | 5-4 | Ravenna | 2-2 | 3-2 |
| (E) Pontevecchio | 5-4 | Orvietana | 1-1 | 4-3 |
| (F) Santegidiese | 3-6 | R.C. Angolana | 1-3 | 2-3 |
| (G) Cynthia | 1-1 | Palestrina (saved for best placed) | 0-1 | 1-0 |
| (G) Progetto Sant'Elia | 2-1 | Monterotondo Lupa | 2-1 | 0-0 |
| (H) Real Nocera | 3-3 | Grottaglie (saved for best placed) | 2-1 | 1-2 |
| (I) Nissa | 2-1 | Acri | 2-0 | 0-1 |
| (I) Marsala | 0-0 | Acireale (saved for best placed) | 0-0 | 0-0 |
