= Pasquale Berardi =

Italian footballer

Personal information
- Full name: Pasquale Berardi
- Date of birth: 3 January 1983 (age 43)
- Place of birth: Bari, Italy
- Position: Midfielder

Senior career*
Years	Team	Apps	(Gls)
2000–2001	Bari	1	(0)
2001–2002	→ SPAL (loan)	0	(0)
2002–2003	→ Martina (loan)	27	(1)
2003	Bari	8	(0)
2004	→ Viterbese (loan)	9	(1)
2004–2005	→ Ancona (loan)	37	(11)
2005	Bari	8	(0)
2006	→ Sambenedettese (loan)	7	(2)
2006–2007	Bari	0	(0)
2007	→ Ivrea (loan)	17	(0)
2007–2009	Catanzaro	62	(11)
2009–2010	Paganese	6	(0)
2010	Cassino	12	(1)
2010–2011	Luco Canistro	32	(12)
2011	Martina	1	(0)
2011–2012	Luco Canistro	30	(3)
2012–2013	Amiternina	21	(2)
2013	Jesina	0	(0)
2013	→ Sulmona (loan)	1	(0)
2013–2014	Jesina	30	(14)
2014	Fidelis Andria	1	(0)
2014–2015	Villabiagio	12	(0)
2015	Castiadas	15	(0)
2015–2016	Team Altamura	16	(5)
2016	Vigor Trani	0	(0)
2016	FC Castello	10	(0)
2016–2017	Castelfidardo	18	(1)
2017	Fabriano Cerreto	12	(4)
2017–2018	Barletta	18	(3)
- * Club domestic league appearances and goals

Pasquale Berardi (born 3 January 1983 in Bari, Italy) is a former Italian footballer. He played as a midfielder.
