= FC Castiglione =

Castiglione
- Full name: Football Club Castiglione Società Sportiva Dilettantistica srl
- Founded: 2008 (as Castiglione Savoia)
- Ground: Stadio Lusetti, Castiglione delle Stiviere, Italy & Stadio Danilo Martelli, Mantua, Italy
- Capacity: 8,000 & 14,884
- Chairman: Andrea Laudini
- Manager: Ivan Pelati
- League: Eccellenza Lombardy, Girone C
- 2018–19: Promozione Lomardy/C, 11th (promotion)
Home colours	Away colours

F.C. Castiglione S.S.D. (formerly F.C. Sterilgarda Castiglione A.S.D.) is an Italian association football club, based in Castiglione delle Stiviere, Lombardy.

== History ==
The club was founded in 2008 as F.C. Castiglione Savoia A.S.D., after the merger of Nuova A.C. Marmirolo (with the transfer of its sports title of Eccellenza) of Marmirolo and the local team of A.S.D. Savoia from Terza Categoria Mantova. In the 2009–10 season the club was promoted from the Eccellenza Lombardy to the Serie D.

In the summer of 2010 the club changed its name to "F.C. Sterilgarda Castiglione A.S.D.", after the name of their main sponsor, Sterilgarda Foods S.p.A., known dairy company.

In the 2011–12 Serie D season, Sterilgarda Castiglione was promoted to Lega Pro Seconda Divisione for the first time. The sponsor, anyway, withdrew its support and the club changed its name to the current one. After two seasons it was relegated back to Serie D, where in 2014–15 it won group B but later announced that it definitely renounced promotion because of economic problems to focus on youth football. However, the senior team entered Terza Categoria Bresciana for the 2015–16 season. After a few years of settlement, the club has risen to Eccellenza Lombardy, the regional Eccellenza football division for clubs in Lombardy, Italy.

== Colors and badge ==
The team's colors are blue and red.
