= Andrea Delcarro =

Italian footballer (born 1993)

Personal information
- Date of birth: 25 March 1993 (age 33)
- Place of birth: Treviglio, Italy
- Height: 1.85 m (6 ft 1 in)
- Position: Midfielder

Team information
- Current team: Renate
- Number: 11

Senior career*
Years	Team	Apps	(Gls)
2010–2012	Rudianese	26	(1)
2012–2016	Caravaggio	110	(10)
2016	Levico Terme	20	(0)
2017–2018	Clodiense	32	(7)
2018–2019	Adriese 1906	33	(8)
2019–2020	Calvina Sport	23	(12)
2020–2021	Virtus Verona	34	(3)
2021–2022	Ancona-Matelica	28	(4)
2022–2024	Rimini	59	(11)
2024–	Renate	67	(8)
- * Club domestic league appearances and goals as of 29 April 2026

Andrea Delcarro (born 25 March 1993) is an Italian professional footballer who plays as a midfielder for Serie C Group A club Renate.

== Club career ==
Born in Treviglio, Delcarro started his senior career for Rudianese in Serie D. He spent 10 seasons in Serie D.

On 17 July 2020, he signed for Serie C club Virtus Verona. He made his professional debut on 4 October 2020 against Imolese.

On 7 July 2021, he joined Ancona-Matelica.

On 8 July 2022, he moved to Rimini.
