= ADC Ars et Labor Grottaglie =

Italian football club

Grottaglie Calcio
- Full name: Associazione Dilettantistica Calcio Ars et Labor Grottaglie
- Founded: 1962
- Ground: Stadio Atlantico D'Amuri, Grottaglie, Italy
- Capacity: 2,400
- Chairman: Carmelo Lavolpe
- Manager: Giacomo Pettinicchio
- League: Eccellenza Apulia
- 2020–21: Promozione/B, 10th
Home colours	Away colours

Associazione Dilettantistica Calcio Ars et Labor Grottaglie is an Italian association football club located in Grottaglie, Apulia. It currently plays in Eccellenza Apulia.

== History ==
The club was founded in 1962 and in the following years alternating between the D series championships, Eccellenza and Promozione.

Then in the 2000–01 season came yet another qualification to Serie D in these years, when the team reached the final of Coppa Italia Serie D, losing to Pievigina.

In 2006–07 Grottaglie for the first time in its history got into the qualifying play-offs for promotion, but it lost the first game to another team from Apulia, ASD Barletta. The following season, it moved up to 5th place in the league, and again gained qualification for the playoffs, although the race ended at this juncture in the first round against ASD Barletta.

At the end of the 2008–09 season the team was ranked at 15th and had to go into a relegation play-off against Bitonto. On 7 June 2009, Grottaglie lost 1–0 in an away match at Bitonto, after drawing 0–0 in the first leg, and moved back down to Eccellenza. However, on 2 September 2009, Grottaglie returned to Serie D after the decision of the National Court of Arbitration for Sport to reassign the places in the league. In season 2013–14 Grottaglie play the Serie D Group H, and it arrived at 16th but won the relegation play-off and thus remained in Serie D. From 2014 to 2017 Grottaglie was relegated from Serie D (the 4th level of Italian Football) to Prima Categoria (the 8th level of Italian Football). In season 2017–18 Grottaglie play for the first time in Prima Categoria and win the Apulia Cup for the first time in their history. In Season 2018–19 Grottaglie end the season at the 1st place and is promoted to Promozione Apulia. In Season 2019–20 Grottaglie ended the season at the 10th place after the league was stopped for the COVID-19 emergence. After that the club was promoted in Eccellenza Apulia because of the renewal of the league.

== Colors and badge ==
The colors of the club are white and blue.

== Chronology ==
- 1962 – Foundation of Ars et Labor Grottaglie
- 1963–64 – 10° in Prima Categoria Apulia gir. B
- 1964–65 – 3° in Prima Categoria Apulia gir. B
- 1965–66 – 4° in Prima Categoria Apulia gir. B
- 1966–67 – 9° in Prima Categoria Apulia gir. B
- 1967–68 – 9° in Prima Categoria Apulia gir. B
- 1968–69 – 8° in Prima Categoria Apulia gir. B
- 1969–70 – 3° in Prima Categoria Apulia gir. B
- 1970–71 – 4° in Promozione Apulia gir. B
- 1971–72 – 2° in Promozione Apulia gir. B
- 1972–73 – 1° in Promozione Apulia gir. B – Promoted in Serie D
- 1973–74 – 14° in Serie D gir. H
- 1974–75 – 6° in Serie D gir. H
- 1975–76 – 16° in Serie D gir. H – Relegated in Promozione
- 1976–77 – 2° in Promozione Apulia gir. B
- 1977–78 – 1° in Promozione Apulia gir. B – Promoted in Serie D
- 1978–79 – 12° in Serie D gir. E
- 1979–80 – 6° in Serie D gir. E
- 1980–81 – 8° in Serie D gir. E
- 1981–82 – 12° in Interregionale gir. L
- 1982–83 – 14° in Interregionale gir. L – Relegated but was repechanged
- 1983–84 – 5° in Interregionale gir. I
- 1984–85 – 14° in Interregionale gir. I – Relegated in Promozione
- 1985–86 – 6° in Promozione Apulia gir. B
- 1986–87 – 9° in Promozione Apulia gir. B
- 1987–88 – 9° in Promozione Apulia gir. B
- 1988–89 – 2° in Promozione Apulia gir. B – Promoted in Interregionale
- 1989–90 – 15° in Interregionale gir. L – Relegated in Promozione
- 1990–91 – 4° in Promozione Apulia gir. B
- 1991–92 – 8° in Eccellenza Apulia
- 1992–93 – 14° in Eccellenza Apulia – Relegated in Promozione
- 1993–94 – 7° in Promozione Apulia gir. B
- 1994–95 – 3° in Promozione Apulia gir. B
- 1995–96 – 3° in Promozione Apulia gir. B
- 1996–97 – 2° in Promozione Apulia gir. B – Promoted in Eccellenza Apulia
- 1997–98 – 8° in Eccellenza Apulia
- 1998–99 – 10° in Eccellenza Apulia
- 1999-00 – 6° in Eccellenza Apulia
- 2000–01 – 1° in Eccellenza Apulia – Promoted in Serie D
- 2001–02 – 3° in Serie D gir. H
- 2002–03 – 11° in Serie D gir. H
- 2003–04 – 13° in Serie D gir. H – Saved after Play-out beating Cassino
- 2004–05 – 8° in Serie D gir. H
- 2005–06 – 12° in Serie D gir. H
- 2006–07 – 3° in Serie D gir. H – Eliminated in first turn of Play-off by Barletta
- 2007–08 – 5° in Serie D gir. H – Eliminated in first turn of Play-off by Barletta
- 2008–09 – 15° in Serie D gir. H – Relegated in Eccellenza Apulia after losing in Play-out but was repechanged
- 2009–10 – 10° in Serie D gir. H
- 2010–11 – 12° in Serie D gir. H – Saved after tie-breaker beating Sant'Antonio Abate
- 2011–12 – 14° in Serie D gir. H – Saved after Play-out beating Real Nocera Superiore
- 2012–13 – 16° in Serie D gir. H – Relegated in Eccellenza Apulia after losing in Play-out but was repechanged
- 2013–14 – 16° in Serie D gir. H – Saved after Play-out beating Real Hyria
- 2014–15 – 18° in Serie D gir. H – Relegated to Eccellenza Apulia
- 2015–16 – 17° in Eccellenza Apulia– Relegated to Promozione Apulia
- 2016–17 – 16° in Promozione Apulia– Relegated to Prima Categoria
- 2017–18 – 5° in Prima Categoria - Winner of Apulia Cup (1° time)
- 2018–19 – 1° in Prima Categoria– Promoted in Promozione Apulia
- 2019–20 – 10° in Promozione Apulia– Promoted in Eccellenza Apulia
