= History of US Palestrina 1919 =

The history of Unione Sportiva Palestrina 1919 or simply Palestrina starts in 1919 when it was founded. It is an Italian association football club, based in Palestrina, Lazio, but playing in the San Basilio district of Rome, Lazio. Currently it plays in Serie D.

== From 1919 to 2012 ==
=== Foundation ===
U.S. Palestrina 1919 was founded in 1919.

=== Serie D ===
==== From 2010 to 2012 ====
In the season 2010–11 the club won the group A of Eccellenza Lazio and so was promoted to Serie D for the first time.

In the 2011–12 season in Serie D/G it was ranked 13th.

In summer 2012 the side transferred the seat and its sports title of Serie D to a new company founded by entrepreneurs Roman, located in the district San Basilio of the city of Rome, becoming San Basilio Palestrina. In the 2012–13 season it has been only a football academy.

=== U.S. Palestrina 1919 ===
In the summer 2013 the club changed its name back to U.S. Palestrina 1919.

=== Colors and badge ===
The team's colors are green and orange.

=== Stadium ===
Up to 2011–12 season it has played at the Stadio Comunale, in Palestrina; since the 2013–14 season instead it plays at the Centro Sportivo Francesca Gianni, Rome.
