= Alessandro Busti =

Canadian soccer player (born 2000)

Personal information
- Full name: Alessandro Carlo Matthew Busti
- Date of birth: June 30, 2000 (age 26)
- Place of birth: Toronto, Ontario, Canada
- Height: 1.89 m (6 ft 2 in)
- Position: Goalkeeper

Youth career
- 2009–2010: Lascaris
- 2010–2018: Juventus

Senior career*
Years	Team	Apps	(Gls)
2018–2019	Juventus U23	1	(0)
2019–2020	Belluno	15	(0)
2020–2021	Vado		
2021–2023	ASD Valdruento		
2023–2026	Rivarolese		
2026–	Druentina		

International career^{‡}
2018	Canada U20	3	(0)
2018	Canada U21	1	(0)
2018	Canada	1	(0)
- * Club domestic league appearances and goals as of February 4, 2022 ‡ National team caps and goals as of November 18, 2018

Alessandro Carlo Matthew Busti (born June 30, 2000) is a Canadian soccer player who plays as a goalkeeper in Italy for Druentina in the Eccellenza .

== Early life ==
Busti was born in Toronto, Ontario, Canada to Italian parents and raised in Turin, Italy. Busti grew up playing soccer and tennis.

Busti began playing at youth level with Lascaris at the age of nine, and joined the Juventus Academy a year later. On December 5, 2017, Busti made his European debut in a 2–0 defeat to Olympiacos in the UEFA Youth League.

== Club career ==
In August 2018, Busti was named to the Juventus U23 squad for their inaugural season in Serie C. Busti made his debut for Juventus U23 in a Serie C match against A.C. Gozzano on April 18, 2019, coming on as an 89th minute substitute for Mattia Del Favero. In August 2019, he went on trial with Toronto FC II playing in an exhibition match against the Saskatchewan Selects.

On September 10, 2019, he signed with Serie D club Belluno.

In December 2020, Busti would sign with Serie D club Vado.

In 2021, he joined ASD Valdruento in the sixth tier Promozione. In July 2023, Busti signed with Promozione side Rivarolese. In July 2026, he joined ASD Druentina.

== International career ==
=== Youth ===
In May 2018, Busti was called up to the Canadian U21 national team for the 2018 Toulon Tournament. He acted as back-up to James Pantemis in the opening game of the tournament, and made his youth debut in a 1–0 victory against Turkey U20s on May 31, 2018. Busti was an unused substitute in the final group game as Canada finished second and failed to progress to the knockout rounds. The team would finish sixth overall after a loss to France in the fifth place playoff.

In October 2018, Busti was named to the Canada U20 team for the 2018 CONCACAF U-20 Championship, a week after making his debut for the senior team.

=== Senior ===
In August 2018, Busti was named in the Canada national team for the first time to face the US Virgin Islands in CONCACAF Nations League qualifying the following month. Busti would be an unused substitute in an 8–0 victory. In October 2018, Busti was again named to the roster for the Nations League qualifying game against Dominica. He would make his senior national team debut in this game, recording a clean sheet in a 5–0 victory.

== Career statistics ==
=== Club ===
Appearances and goals by club, season and competition
Club	Season	League			Other		Total	
Club	Season	Division	Apps	Goals	Apps	Goals	Apps	Goals
Juventus U23	2018–19	Serie C	1	0	—		1	0
Belluno	2019–20	Serie D	12	0			12+	0+
Vado	2020–21	Serie D						
Valdruento	2021–22	Promozione						
Career total			13+	0+	0+	0+	13+	0+

=== International ===
As of November 18, 2018

Canada National Team
Year	Apps	Goals
2018	1	0
Total	1	0
