= ASD Atletico Boville Ernica =

Italian football club

Atletico Boville
- Full name: Associazione Sportiva Dilettantistica Atletico Boville Ernica
- Founded: 1994 (as Boville Ernica Calcio); 2011 (as Atletico Boville Ernica)
- Ground: Stadio Montorli, Boville Ernica, Italy
- Capacity: 2,000
- Chairman: Daniele Santopadre
- Manager: Fabio Marziali
- League: Eccellenza Lazio
- 2011–12: Serie D/G, 18th
Home colours	Away colours

Associazione Sportiva Dilettantistica Atletico Boville Ernica (formerly A.S.D. Boville Ernica Calcio), usually referred to as simply Atletico Boville is an Italian association football club located in Boville Ernica, Lazio. It currently plays in Eccellenza Lazio.

== History ==
The club was founded in 1994 as Boville Ernica Calcio and renamed in 2011 with the current name.

In the season 2011–12 it was relegated to Eccellenza.

== Colors and badge ==
The team's color are red and blue.
