= Boville =

Boville may refer to some places in the Italian region of Lazio:

- Boville Ernica, a municipality in the Province of Frosinone
- Boville (Marino), a civil parish of Marino, in the Province of Rome; autonomous municipality from 1993 to 1995
- Bovillae, ancient town of Latium, currently part of Marino, in the Province of Rome
