= Polisportiva Viribus Unitis =

Italian football club

Viribus Unitis
- Full name: Polisportiva Viribus Unitis
- Founded: 1917
- Ground: Stadio Felice Nappi, Somma Vesuviana, Italy
- Capacity: 2,500
- Chairman: Antonio Della Corte
- Manager: Vincenzo Scafa
- 2011–12: Serie D/H, 16th
Home colours	Away colours

Polisportiva Viribus Unitis has been Italian association football club located in Somma Vesuviana, Campania. It currently plays in Eccellenza.

== History ==
The club was founded during 1917 in Somma Vesuviana (which lies within the Province of Naples), north of Mount Vesuvius). The club was affiliated in 1919 and took its name from the ship SMS Viribus Unitis with Riccardo Angrisani as its first president. The founders of the club were:

- Emilio Rossi
- Michele Pellegrino
- Michele De Lucia
- Michele Sepe
- Gaetano Russo
- Raffaele De Martino

- Francesco Parisi
- Pasquale Castaldo
- Ugo De Falco
- Guido Perillo
- Felice Mosca
- Giuseppe D'Avino

- Zaccaria Miele
- Antonio Capasso
- Arturo Rianna
- Fiore D'Avino
- Pasquale Cerciello

The commissioners for Virbus were Vincenzo Bianco and Gioacchino Mosca. At the time, the club was a multi-sports one: as well as playing football it competed in cycling, marathon running and general athletics.

In 1989 Viribus was merged with Polisportiva Somma.

In the season 2011–12 it was relegated to Eccellenza.

== Colors and badge ==
Its colors are red and blue.

== Honours ==
- Eccellenza Campania
  - Champions: 1997–98
- Promozione
  - Champions: 1996–97
