= GSD Lascaris =

Italian football club

Lascaris
- Full name: Gruppo Sportivo Dilettantistico Lascaris
- Founded: 1954
- Ground: Stadio Comunale, Pianezza, Italy
- Chairman: Francesco Trabucco
- Manager: Daisuke Yano(2019-)
- League: Eccellenza Piedmont and Aosta Valley
- 2011–12: Serie D/A, 19th
Home colours	Away colours

Gruppo Sportivo Dilettantistico Lascaris or simply Lascaris is an Italian association football club located in Pianezza, Piedmont. It in the season 2012–13 will play in Eccellenza.

== History ==
The club was founded in 1954 by the boys who frequented the oratory of the parish of Pianezza, located near Villa Lascaris, built by the Marquis Agostino Lascaris of Ventimiglia, who gave the name to the team.

In summer 2011 it was promoted by repechage from Eccellenza Piedmont and Aosta Valley to Serie D for the first time.

In the season 2011–12 it was immediately relegated again to Eccellenza.

== Colors and badge ==
The color of the side were initially royal blue, until when the president Lelio Bettini changed them in black and white, like those of Juventus.
