= Internapoli FC =

Italian football club

Internapoli
- Full name: Associazione Sportiva Dilettantistica Calcio Internapoli 1964
- Nicknames: Biancocelesti; Partenopei
- Founded: 1909; 117 years ago as, Sport Club Vomero; 1935; 91 years ago as, CRAL Cirio (refounded); 1964; 62 years ago as, Internapoli Football Club (takeover); 2003; 23 years ago as, Società Sportiva Dilettantistica Internapoli Camaldoli (relocated); 2011; 15 years ago as, Società Sportiva Dilettantistica Internapoli Città di Marano (relocated); 2012; 14 years ago as, Società Sportiva Dilettantistica Puteolana 1902 Internapoli (relocated); 2014; 12 years ago as, Società Sportiva Dilettantistica Internapoli; 2022; 4 years ago as, Associazione Sportiva Dilettantistica Calcio Internapoli 1964 (refounded)
- Ground: Centro Sportivo La Paratina, Naples, Italy
- League: Prima Categoria
- 2011–12: Serie D/H, 12th (relocated to another city for next season's competition)
Home colours	Away colours

Associazione Sportiva Dilettantistica Calcio Internapoli 1964 are an Italian association football club based in the Vomero area of Naples, Campania. It currently plays in Prima Categoria.

== History ==
The club's roots can be traced to CRAL Cirio who were founded in 1935. They played in the San Giovanni a Teduccio neighborhood of Naples. They were named after the Turin industrialist Francesco Cirio who founded the first tomato canning company (still operating under the same name today in San Giovanni a Teduccio.), After playing for a time in regional leagues in Campania, in 1951–52 they were entered into a league equivalent to Serie D, where they finished in the top half of the table.

During the 1953–54 season, Cirio narrowly missed being promoted to Serie C after coming in second to Foggia in their category by just two points. They bounced back, ending the next season first in their group, but they lost the playoff game 1–0 to a club from Molfetta. In the next two seasons, they ended in second place in their group, losing to Reggina and Marsala respectively.

In the 1957–58 season, the club was promoted to Serie C, having ended the season ahead of clubs such as Lecce, Casertana and Avellino. In Serie C, they achieved a respectable 9th-place finish in their group. However, the following season, after ending with the same number of points as Crotone, they lost a play-out match 1–0 and were relegated to Serie D again. By the end of their time as "Cirio," they had lost form in Serie D and had been unable to achieve better results.

=== Rebirth under the name Internapoli ===
On 30 June 1964, Dr. Giovanni Proto and Carlo Del Gaudio took over the club along with a group of Naples locals who worked as builders and manufacturers; renaming it Internapoli Football Club. Many of the players from the old club remained, including men such as Anglo-Italian player Giuseppe Wilson who would later go on to fame with Lazio and Italy.

The club was reborn under the name Internapoli to ensure that the city of Naples would have a stable football club of some sort. Neighbouring clubs like A.C. Napoli were experiencing financial difficulties, leaving their future hanging in the balance. But within a week of Internapoli's founding, Associazione Calcio Napoli had changed their name to Società Sportiva Calcio Napoli and continued on.

Along with a new name came new colours, the green kit of Cirio was replaced by sky blue and white stripes, known in Italy as biancocelesti. Internapoli had taken control of the "Stadio Arturo Collana" in the Vomero neighbourhood, which has previously been used by SSC Napoli who had left for the considerably larger "Stadio San Paolo".

Internapoli achieved their first promotion under the new dominion in the 1966–67 season, it was a closely competed league with Internapoli beating out second place Savoia by just one point. As they were promoted into Serie C to start a four-season spell in the league, Internapoli began to gather popularity gaining a fan club of 6000 strong, it was called "Amici dell'Internapoli" (Friends of Internapoli).

Brazilian Luís Vinício was manager during one season in this Serie C period, the squad of the time included a bright young striker in Giorgio Chinaglia who would later go on to fame with Lazio. Two out of the four seasons during this time in Serie C were particularly notable, in both the 1968–69 and 1969–70 seasons Internapoli finished in third place; their highest ever finish in the Italian football league.

=== Decline and merger with Puteolana ===
However, following their consecutive third-place finishes some of the club's most influential players were bought by more famous clubs and Internapoli were relegated in bottom place. Down in Serie D the following season, the club were stunned when they were relegated for the second season in a row. It was a cruel relegation for the club when considering that the team who finished 9th were only three points above 16th place Internapoli.

The club had fallen back down to the regional footballing competitions for the rest of the 1970s, in leagues such as Promozione Campania. By the start of the 1980s, Internapoli were starting to come back into form; first they won the Coppa Italia Dilettanti by beating Mobilieri Ponsacco 1–0, the competition is the amateur equivalent of the Coppa Italia. Eventually, the club pulled themselves back up into Serie D (known as Campionato Interregionale at the time) for the 1981–82 season.

Because of problems with their home "Stadio Collana", Internapoli were moved to Pozzuoli and became part of the club Puteolana 1909, essential leaving Internapoli liquidized. However, many wanted to bring back the old club for their area and so a new club named Gabbiano Napoli was set up playing in 1 °Categoria. Gabbiano swiftly climbed up the Italian league tables and during the 1991–92 season, they were crowned champions of the Eccellenza Campania. This meant they were promoted into Serie D (then known as Campionato Nazionale Dilettanti), where they consistently finished in the top half of their group during the early 1990s.

=== Return of Internapoli ===
At the end of the 1995–96 season, when Gabbiano finished as runners-up to Casertana, they restored the name of the club to Internapoli. This was the first time Internapoli had fully returned in full form since the split in 1982. The restoration was initiated by president Cerbone and vice-president Dr. Alinei; they chose coach Enzo Troiano to take care of the squad.

In their first season back under the Internapoli name, they almost achieved promotion, but came runners-up to Cavese, missing out by three points. In the following two seasons they were unable to equal or better this; they slipped down to 7th and in the next season they were placed in a group with many Sicilian teams, this proved to be their downfall as all the traveling proved tough and they were subsequently relegated.

Dario Pasquariello moved the club to the city of Torre Annunziata at the end of 1999, essentially leaving Internapoli in a defunct state once again. A local team Camaldoli, owned by Francesco and Massimo Di Marino made moves to change their club into Internapoli to carry on the legacy. This was achieved, Camaldoli's red and yellow colours were exchanged for the traditional sky blue and white; the club's name was changed to Internapoli Camaldoli. At the end of the 2010–11 Eccellenza season, the club gained promotion to Serie D and moved to Marano di Napoli, changing their denomination to S.S.D. Internapoli Città di Marano.

==== Maradona Junior ====
During the mid-2000s, the club gained widespread attention in the Italian media, this was because the Italian son of Diego Maradona, named Diego Sinagra was signed by the club.

==== Serie D ====
At the end of the 2010–11 Eccellenza season, the club was promoted to Serie D after the play-off.

=== Puteolana 1902 Internapoli ===
At the end of the 2011–12 Serie D season, Internapoli Città di Marano moved from the city of Marano di Napoli to Pozzuoli and changed its name to S.S.D. Puteolana 1902 Internapoli in order to continue the soccer history of Puteolana.

== Colors and badge ==
The team's colours are biancocelesti.

== Honours ==
- Serie D
  - Champions: 1966–67
  - Promoted: 1957–58
- Eccellenza Campania
  - Champions: 1991–92
- Coppa Italia Dilettanti
  - Winners: 1980–81
