= ASD Miglianico Calcio =

Italian football club

Miglianico
- Full name: Associazione Sportiva Dilettantistica Miglianico Calcio
- Founded: 1947
- Ground: Stadio Comunale, Miglianico, Italy
- Capacity: 600
- Chairman: Valeriano Palombaro
- Manager: Pantaleone Palladinetti
- League: Promozione
Home colours	Away colours

Associazione Sportiva Dilettantistica Miglianico Calcio is an Italian association football club, based in Miglianico, Abruzzo. Currently it plays in Promozione.

== History ==
The club was founded in 1947.

At the end of the 2010–11 Serie D season, Miglianico was relegated to Eccellenza Abruzzo, but on 5 August 2011, it was readmitted to Serie D to fill vacancies.

In the next season 2011–12 it was again relegated to Eccellenza.

== Colors and badge ==
The team's colors are yellow and dark blue.
