= US Angri Calcio 1927 ASD =

Italian football club

Angri
- Full name: Unione Sportiva Angri 1927 Associazione Sportiva Dilettantistica
- Founded: 1927
- Ground: Stadio Pasquale Novi, Angri, Italy
- Capacity: 3,100
- Chairman: Armando Lanzione
- Manager: Luigi Sanchez
- League: Eccellenza
- 2022–23: Serie D
Home colours	Away colours

Unione Sportiva Angri 1927 Associazione Sportiva Dilettantistica is an Italian association football club located in Angri, Campania, that plays in Eccellenza.

== History ==
Old Angri logo ...-2011

=== Origins ===
Angri was founded in 1927 with name Sporting Group Cotoniere Angri (Gruppo Sportivo Cotoniere Angri), and in the 1946 the team was promoted in Serie C.

=== Years 1990–1999 ===
In the 1995–1996 season the team won the Italian Cup Amateur Campania (Coppa Italia Dilettanti Campania).

=== Years 2000–2009 ===
In the 2000–2001 season, the team was promoted in Serie D. In the 2006–2007 season, the team finished 2nd in the championship, and narrowly missed promotion to Serie C.

=== Years 2010 ===
The team at the end of the 2010–2011 season is 16th in the standings and have a financial crisis, and the team failure. Restart in the Terza Categoria in 2011–2012. In 2012–2013 season Angri has acquired the sports title of Eccellenza club Real Nocera but at the end season the sports title has sell at US Agropoli. In the 2013–2014 season and the team restart from the Seconda Categoria. In 2014–2015 season was arrived 2nd and was promoted in Prima Categoria.

== Colors and badge ==
Its colors were grey and red.

== Honours ==
=== Cup ===
- Coppa Italia Amateur Campania (1): 1995–1996

=== League ===
- Championship Eccellenza (3): 2021-2022, 2000–2001, 1996–1997
- Championship Promozione (3): 1972–1973, 1980–1981, 1985–1986
