= Eccellenza Basilicata =

- Organising body: Lega Nazionale Dilettanti
- Founded: 1991
- Country: Italy
- Confederation: UEFA
- Number of clubs: 16
- Promotion to: Serie D
- Relegation to: Promozione Basilicata
- League cup: Coppa Italia Dilettanti
- Current champions: Ferrandina (2024–25)
- Most championships: Ferrandina, Francavilla, Vultur, Melfi, Pisticci, Sporting Genzano, Real Metapontino, Rotonda (2 titles each)
- Website: https://www.lnd.it

Eccellenza Basilicata is the regional Eccellenza football division for clubs in the Southern Italian region of Basilicata, Italy. It is competed among 16 teams, in one group. The winners of the Groups are promoted to Serie D. The club who finishes second also have the chance to gain promotion, they are entered into a national play-off which consists of two rounds.

== Champions ==
Here are the past champions of the Basilicata Eccellenza, organised into their respective seasons.

- 1991–92 Vultur Rionero
- 1992–93 Melfi
- 1993–94 Invicta Potenza
- 1994–95 Melfi
- 1995–96 Sporting Villa D'Agri
- 1996–97 Lagonegro
- 1997–98 Policoro
- 1998–99 Ferrandina
- 1999–2000 Materasassi
- 2000–01 Pisticci
- 2001–02 ASC Potenza
- 2002–03 Bernalda
- 2003–04 Lavello
- 2004–05 Francavilla sul Sinni
- 2005–06 Sporting Genzano
- 2006–07 Horatiana Venosa
- 2007–08 Sporting Genzano
- 2008–09 Pisticci
- 2009–10 Fortis Murgia
- 2010–11 Angelo Cristofaro
- 2011–12 Atletico Potenza
- 2012–13 Real Metapontino
- 2013–14 Rossoblu Potenza
- 2014–15 AZ Picerno
- 2015–16 Vultur Rionero
- 2016–17 Real Metapontino
- 2017–18 Rotonda
- 2018–19 Grumentum Val d'Agri
- 2019–20 Lavello
- 2020–21 Not assigned
- 2021–22 Matera Grumentum
- 2022–23 Rotonda
- 2023–24 Francavilla
- 2024–25 Ferrandina
