= AS Sestese Calcio =

Italian football club

Sestese
- Full name: Associazione Sportiva Sestese Calcio
- Founded: 1945
- Ground: Stadio Pietro Torrini, Sesto Fiorentino, Italy
- Capacity: 5,000
- Chairman: Filippo Giusti
- Manager: Roberto Malotti
- League: Eccellenza
- 2011–12: Serie D/D, 20th
Home colours	Away colours

Associazione Sportiva Sestese Calcio is an Italian association football club located in Sesto Fiorentino, Tuscany. It currently plays in Eccellenza.

== History ==
Sestese was founded in 1945

It in the season 2010–11 it was relegated from Serie D group E to Eccellenza Tuscany after playout, but it was readmitted to serie D to fill vacancies.

In the 2011–12 season it was again relegated to Eccellenza.

== Colors and badge ==
Its colors are blue and red.

== Honours ==
- Coppa Italia Dilettanti
  - Winners: 1988–89
