= ACMM Sarego ASD =

Italian football club

Sarego
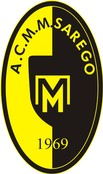
- Full name: Associazione Calcio M.M. Sarego Associazione Sportiva Dilettantistica
- Founded: 1969 (as A.S. Monticello di Fara); 1975 (as A.S. La Favorita); 1989 (as A.C. M.M. Sarego A.S.D.)
- Ground: Stadio Comunale; Sarego, Italy
- Chairman: Roberto Callegari
- Manager: Paolo Beggio
- League: Eccellenza Veneto
- 2011–12: Serie D/C, 15th
Home colours	Away colours

Associazione Calcio M.M. Sarego Associazione Sportiva Dilettantistica or simply Sarego is an Italian association football club, based in Sarego, Veneto.

Sarego currently plays in Eccellenza.

== History ==
=== From Monticello di Fara to M.M. Sarego ===
The club was founded in 1969 as A.S. Monticello di Fara in the local fraction of Sarego and it was renamed in 1975 as A.S. La Favorita.

==== M.M. Sarego ====
In the summer of 1989 the team was refounded, after the merger with the citizen club of the fraction of Meledo, with the current denomination (M.M. are the initials of the fractions of the teams that have merged).

In the season 2010–11 it was promoted from Eccellenza Veneto A to Serie D.

In the season 2011–12 it was relegated to Eccellenza.

== Colors and badge ==
The team's colors are yellow and black.
