= Zampaglione =

Zampaglione is an Italian surname. Notable people with the surname include:

- Domenico Zampaglione (born 1986), Italian footballer
- Federico Zampaglione, Italian musician
- Fortunato Zampaglione (born 1975), Italian singer-songwriter, producer, lyricist, and composer
