= Albin Hodža =

Albanian footballour (born 1988)

Personal information
- Full name: Albin Romain Hodža
- Date of birth: 7 February 1988 (age 38)
- Place of birth: Choisy-le-Roi, France
- Height: 1.84 m (6 ft 0 in)
- Position: Forward

Youth career
- –2007: Brétigny-sur-Orge
- 2007–2008: Udinese

Senior career*
Years	Team	Apps	(Gls)
2008–2009	Udinese	0	(0)
2008	→ Paganese (loan)	3	(0)
2008–2009	→ Manfredonia (loan)	9	(0)
2009–2010	Sorrento	2	(0)
2009–2010	→ Vico Equense (loan)	14	(0)
2010–2011	Real Nocera Superiore	18	(3)
2011–2012	Olympique Noisy-le-Sec		
2012–2013	Pirin Gotse Delchev	25	(5)
2013–2014	Lyubimets 2007	13	(0)
2014	SHB Đà Nẵng		
2015–2016	Flamurtari Vlorë	0	(0)
- Neufchâtel-en-Bray
- * Club domestic league appearances and goals as of 19 May 2014

Albin Romain Hodža (also spelled Hodzha; born 7 February 1988) is an Albanian footballer who played as a forward.

== Career ==
Born in Choisy-le-Roi, a suburb of Paris, Hodža was signed by Serie A club Udinese youth team in January 2007. He also wore no.23 shirt of the first team and appeared as unused sub in round 37 against A.C. Milan.

In January 2008, he was loaned to Paganese along with Alessandro Osso Armellino. In the next season, at first he left for Manfredonia, then on 2 February 2008 sold to Sorrento in co-ownership deal, as part of the transfer that Giovanni Barreca joined the Udine-based club.

On 25 June 2008 Sorrento signed him outright and Hodža signed a new 2-year deal with club. On 28 August 2009 he was loaned to Vico Equense along with Pasquale Chiariello.

In summer 2010, he was released, and he joined Serie D club Real Nocera Superiore, which also his 4th Campania based club.

In January Hodža signed for Albanian Superliga side Flamurtari Vlorë as a free agent after leaving SHB Đà Nẵng.

== Personal life ==
Born in France, Hodža is of Albanian descent.
