= FC Sant'Antonio Abate =

Italian association football club

Sant'Antonio Abate
- Full name: Football Club Sant'Antonio Abate
- Founded: 1971
- Ground: Stadio Comunale, Sant'Antonio Abate, Italy
- Capacity: 1,900
- Chairman: Lorenzo Di Riso
- Manager: Vincenzo D'Aniello
- League: Promotion/H
- 2011–12: Serie D/I, 11th
Home colours	Away colours

Football Club Sant'Antonio Abate is an Italian association football club located in Sant'Antonio Abate, Campania. Currently it plays in Serie D.

== History ==
The club was founded in 1971.

At the end of the 2010-11 Serie D season, the club was relegated to Eccellenza Campania after the play-off, but it was readmitted on 5 August 2011 to fill vacancies.

=== Serie D 2011–12 ===
In the 2011–12 season the club gained access to the Serie D promotion play-off with direct admission to the semifinal as winner of Coppa Italia Serie D, where it was eliminated by Cosenza.

== Colors and badge ==
Its colors are yellow and red

== Honours ==
- Coppa Italia Serie D:
  - Champion (1): 2011–12
