= AS Atletico Trivento =

Italian football club

Atletico Trivento
- Full name: Associazione Sportiva Atletico Trivento
- Founded: 1964
- Dissolved: 2012
- Ground: Stadio Comunale, Trivento, Italy
- Capacity: 1500
- 2011–12: Serie D/F, 6th
Home colours	Away colours

Associazione Sportiva Dilettanti Atletico Trivento was an Italian association football club located in Trivento, Molise.

== History ==
The club was founded in 1964.

=== Eccellenza ===
Atletico Trvento played for some years the championship of Eccellenza Molise arriving in middle positions at the end of the season. In 2006–2007 Trivento and Olympia Agnonese were the second and the first at the last match. They played the match which finished 1–1 so Olympia Agnonese was promoted in Serie D. In the next season Trivento led the championship and finally won the championship. During the season 2007–2008 Trivento won also Coppa Italia Eccellenza Molise and reached semi-finals in the Coppa Italia Eccellenza, after winning with Atessa and with Formia in quarter-finals, being defeated by Hinterreggio, who eventually won the Coppa Italia Eccellenza.

=== Serie D ===
In summer 2012 it does not appeal against the exclusion of Covisod from Serie D and so was excluded from all football.

== Colors and badge ==
The official color of the society were yellow and blue.
