= USD Irsinese Calcio Matera =

Italian football club

Irsinese
- Full name: Unione Sportiva Dilettantistica Irsinese Calcio Matera
- Founded: 2009; 2011 (refounded)
- Dissolved: 2012
- Ground: Stadio XXI Settembre-Franco Salerno, Matera, Italy
- Capacity: 8,500
- 2011–12: Serie D, 13th
| Home colours | Away colours |

U.S.D. Irsinese Calcio Matera was an Italian association football club located in Irsina, Basilicata.

== History ==
=== Fortis Murgia Irsina ===
The club was founded on 22 July 2009 when Fortis Murgia Irsina acquired the sports title of Azzurra Tricarico in Eccellenza Basilicata. In the 2009–10 season Fortis Murgia won this league and the Coppa Italia Eccellenza and was promoted to Serie D where it played its home matches in Altamura.

=== Irsinese Calcio Matera ===
La Fortis Murgia lascia Altamura e diventa U.S.D. Irsinese Calcio. Il Matera scompare del tutto]</ref> On 16 December 2011 it was renamed U.S.D. Irsinese Calcio Matera.

In summer 2012 its sports title of Serie D was transferred to Matera Calcio and so it was dissolved.

== Colors and badge ==
Its colors were white and blue.

== Stadium ==
It played at the Stadio XXI Settembre-Franco Salerno, in Matera, which has a capacity of 8,500.
