= Eccellenza Apulia =

- Organising body: Lega Nazionale Dilettanti
- Founded: 1991
- Country: Italy
- Confederation: UEFA
- Divisions: 1
- Number of clubs: 20
- Promotion to: Serie D
- Relegation to: Promozione Apulia
- League cup: Coppa Italia Dilettanti
- Current champions: Barletta (2024–25)
- Most championships: Barletta (3 titles)
- Website: www.lnd.it
- Current: 2026–26

Eccellenza Apulia (Italian: Eccellenza Puglia) is the regional Eccellenza football division for clubs in the Southern Italian region of Apulia, Italy. It is competed among 20 teams, in one group. The winner of the group is promoted to Serie D. The club who win play-off also have the chance to gain promotion, they are entered into a national play-off which consists of two rounds.

== Champions ==
Here are the past champions of the Apulia Eccellenza, organised into their respective seasons.

- 1991–92 Noci
- 1992–93 Toma Maglie
- 1993–94 San Severo
- 1994–95 Massafra
- 1995–96 Martina
- 1996–97 Noicattaro
- 1997–98 Aradeo
- 1998–99 Virtus Locorotondo
- 2000–01 Grottaglie
- 2001–02 Fortis Trani
- 2002–03 Bitonto
- 2003–04 Gallipoli
- 2004–05 Monopoli
- 2005–06 Barletta
- 2006–07 Fasano
- 2007–08 Francavilla
- 2008–09 Casarano
- 2009–10 Nardò
- 2010–11 Martina
- 2011–12 Monopoli
- 2012–13 San Severo
- 2013–14 Gallipoli
- 2014–15 Virtus Francavilla
- 2015–16 Gravina
- 2016–17 Audace Cerignola
- 2017–18 Fasano
- 2018–19 Casarano
- 2019–20 Molfetta Calcio
- 2020–21 Virtus Matino
- 2021–22 Barletta
- 2022–23 Manfredonia
- 2023–24 Ugento
- 2024–25 Barletta
- 2025–26 Brindisi
