= ASD Luco Canistro =

Italian football club

Luco Canistro
- Full name: Associazione Sportiva Dilettantistica Luco Canistro
- Founded: 1981
- Dissolved: 2012
- Ground: Stadio Comunale, Canistro, Italy
- Capacity: 600
- 2011–12: Serie D/F, 17th
| Home colours | Away colours |

Associazione Sportiva Dilettantistica Luco Canistro was an Italian association football club located in Luco dei Marsi, Abruzzo and that represented also the town of Canistro, Abruzzo.

== History ==
Luco Canistro was founded in 1981.

In the summer 2007 the club has acquired the sport rights in order to play in Serie D from Avezzano.

In the summer 2012, after the relegation to Eccellenza, the club was dissolved.

== Colors and badge ==
Its colors were white and red.
