= ASD Angelo Cristofaro =

Italian football club

Angelo Cristofaro
- Full name: Associazione Sportiva Dilettantistica Angelo Cristofaro
- Founded: 1950
- Ground: Stadio Comunale, Oppido Lucano, Italy
- Capacity: 800
- Chairman: Rocco Antonio Mancuso
- Manager: Corrado Sorrentino
- League: Eccellenza Basilicata
- 2011–12: Serie D/H, 17th
Home colours	Away colours

Associazione Sportiva Dilettantistica Angelo Cristofaro, or simply Angelo Cristofaro, is an Italian association football club, based in Oppido Lucano, Basilicata. Angelo Cristofaro currently plays in Eccellenza Basilicata.

== History ==
The club was founded in 1950.

=== Serie D ===
In the season 2010–11 it was promoted from Eccellenza Basilicata to Serie D, but it was immediately relegated in the following season.

== Colors and badge ==
The team's colors are green and white.
