= AS Valle Grecanica =

Italian football club

Valle Grecanica
- Full name: Associazione Sportiva Valle Grecanica
- Founded: 2010
- Ground: Stadio Saverio Spinella, Melito di Porto Salvo, Italy
- Capacity: 1,100
- Chairman: Giovanni Villari – Domenico Stilo
- Manager: Giuseppe Dima Ruggiano
- League: Eccellenza Calabria
- 2011–12: Serie D/I, 17th
Home colours	Away colours

Associazione Sportiva Valle Grecanica is an Italian association football club located in Melito di Porto Salvo, Calabria. It currently plays in Eccellenza.

== History ==
The club was founded in 2010 through the merger of newly promoted Serie D club Omega Bagaladi (based in Bagaladi) and Eccellenza club Melitese (based in Melito di Porto Salvo).

In the season 2011–12 it was relegated to Eccellenza.

== Colours ==
Its colours are red and yellow.
