= Eccellenza Lombardy =

- Organising body: Lega Nazionale Dilettanti
- Founded: 1991
- Country: Italy
- Confederation: UEFA
- Divisions: 3
- Number of clubs: 54
- Promotion to: Serie D
- Relegation to: Promozione Lombardy
- League cup: Coppa Italia Dilettanti
- Current champions: Pavia (Group A); Mapello (Group B); Rovato Vertovese (Group C) (2024–25)
- Most championships: Pavia, Mapello, Sondrio, Oggiono, Fanfulla, Seregno (2 titles each)
- Website: http://www.lnd.it

Eccellenza Lombardy (Italian: Eccellenza Lombardia) is the regional Eccellenza football division for clubs in Lombardy, Italy. It is competed amongst 48 teams, in three groups (A, B and C). The winners of the Groups are promoted to Serie D. The club which finishes second also has the chance to gain promotion, they are entered into a national play-off which consists of two rounds.

== Champions ==
Here are the past champions of the Lombardy Eccellenza, organised into their respective group.

=== Group A ===
- 1991–92 Gallaratese
- 1992–93 Real Cesate
- 1993–94 Pro Patria
- 1994–95 Corbetta
- 1995–96 Oggiono
- 1996–97 Cantalupo
- 1997–98 Oggiono
- 1998–99 Bellusco
- 1999–2000 Seregno
- 2000–01 Vigevano
- 2001–02 Robbio
- 2002–03 Solbiatese
- 2003–04 Caratese
- 2004–05 Fanfulla
- 2005–06 S.V.Turate
- 2006–07 Sestese
- 2007–08 Casteggio Broni
- 2008–09 Vigevano
- 2009–10 Saronno
- 2010–11 Naviglio Trezzano
- 2011–12 Pro Sesto
- 2012–13 Inveruno
- 2013–14 OltrepoVoghera
- 2014–15 Bustese
- 2015–16 Varese
- 2016–17 Arconatese
- 2017–18 Cavenago Fanfulla
- 2018–19 Castellanzese
- 2019–20 Busto 81
- 2020–21 Olginatese
- 2021–22 Varesina
- 2022–23 Vogherese
- 2023–24 Oltrepò
- 2024–25 Pavia
- 2025-26 GS Arcotanese

=== Group B ===
- 1991–92 Capriolo
- 1992–93 Chiari
- 1993–94 Crema
- 1994–95 Pontisola
- 1995–96 Clusone A.Ser.
- 1996–97 Corbetta
- 1997–98 Sancolombano
- 1998–99 Pavia
- 1999–2000 Bergamasca
- 2000–01 Olginatese
- 2001–02 Canzese
- 2002–03 Città di Lecco
- 2003–04 Fiorente BG
- 2004–05 Renate
- 2005–06 Merate
- 2006–07 Caratese
- 2007–08 AlzanoCene
- 2008–09 Pontisola
- 2009–10 Seregno
- 2010–11 Mapello
- 2011–12 Caravaggio
- 2012–13 Giana Erminio
- 2013–14 Ciserano
- 2014–15 Alzano Cene
- 2015–16 Scanzorosciate
- 2016–17 Crema
- 2017–18 Sondrio
- 2018–19 NibionnOggiono
- 2019–20 Casatese
- 2020–21 Alcione Milano
- 2021–22 Sant'Angelo
- 2022–23 Tritium
- 2023–24 Sondrio
- 2024–25 Mapello
- 2025-26 Tritium

=== Group C ===
- 1991–92 Cassano 1966
- 1992–93 Broni
- 1993–94 Romanese
- 1994–95 Sancolombano
- 1995–96 Trevigliese
- 1996–97 Bagnolese
- 1997–98 Romanese
- 1998–99 Pizzighettone
- 1999–2000 Frassati
- 2000–01 Palazzolo
- 2001–02 Cremapergo
- 2002–03 Nuova Albano
- 2003–04 Salò
- 2004–05 Castellana
- 2005–06 Darfo Boario
- 2006–07 Feralpi Lonato
- 2007–08 Nuova Verolese
- 2008–09 Pedrengo
- 2009–10 Rudianese
- 2010–11 Aurora Seriate
- 2011–12 Sant'Angelo
- 2012–13 Palazzolo
- 2013–14 Ciliverghe Mazzano
- 2014–15 Grumellese
- 2015–16 Darfo Boario
- 2016–17 Rezzato
- 2017–18 Adrense
- 2018–19 Brusaporto
- 2019–20 Telgate
- 2020–21 Leon Monza Brianza
- 2021–22 Lumezzane
- 2022–23 Cast Brescia
- 2023–24 Ospitaletto
- 2024–25 Rovato Vertovese
- 2025-26 Pavonese
