= Domenico Zampaglione =

Italian footballer (born 1986)

Personal information
- Date of birth: 21 February 1986 (age 40)
- Place of birth: Messina, Italy
- Height: 1.76 m (5 ft 9 in)
- Position: Left winger

Team information
- Current team: ASD Bovalinese 1911

Youth career
- Reggina

Senior career*
Years	Team	Apps	(Gls)
2004–2005	Trento	25	(0)
2005	Scillese	1	(0)
2005–2008	Vibonese	50	(2)
2008–2009	HinterReggio	33	(19)
2009–2010	Colligiana	14	(2)
2010	HinterReggio	17	(10)
2010–2011	Valle Grecanica	36	(31)
2011–2012	Chievo	0	(0)
2011–2012	→ Latina (loan)	5	(0)
2012	→ Aversa (loan)	15	(3)
2012–2013	HinterReggio	15	(3)
2013–2014	Lamezia	44	(16)
2014–2015	Nuova Gioiese	30	(13)
2015–2016	Reggina	31	(6)
2016	Palmese	9	(0)
2017	Roccella	2	(0)
2017–2019	ReggioRavagnese 1960		
2019–2021	AC Locri 1909		
2021–2022	Bocale Calcio ADMO		
2022–2023	ASD San Giorgio 2012		
2023	ASD Gallico Catona		
2023–2024	ASD Ardore		
2024	ASD Deliese		
2024–	ASD Bovalinese 1911		
- * Club domestic league appearances and goals as of 2 March 2026

Domenico Zampaglione (born 21 February 1986) is an Italian footballer who plays as a left winger for ASD Bovalinese 1911.

== Biography ==
Born in Messina, Sicily, Zampaglione started his career on the other side of Strait of Messina, at Reggina Calcio. He then left for Serie D teams Trento, Scillese and Calabrian team Vibonese. He finished as the losing side of promotion play-offs in 2006 but promoted to Serie C2 to replace bankrupted teams. In 2008–09 Serie D he played for HinterReggio and in July 2009 returned to Seconda Divisione (ex- Serie C2) for Colligiana. However, in mid-season he returned to Reggio Calabria for HinterReggio. In 2010–11 Serie D he changed to play for Valle Grecanica, newly promoted from Eccellenza Calabria. He scored an impressive 0.86 goals per games and was signed by Serie A team Chievo at the end of season.

In July 2011 he was loaned to Prima Divisione newcomer Latina. He made his debut in the first round of 2011–12 Coppa Italia. On 3 January 2012 Zampaglione left for fourth division club Aversa.

He returned to HinterReggio again in July 2012 in co-ownership deal for a peppercorn of €500. In January 2013 he left for Vigor Lamezia Calcio in a temporary deal. In June 2013 Chievo gave up the remain 50% registration rights.

On 24 July 2013 he remained for Lamezia for another season.
