= ASD Vigor Trani Calcio =

Italian football club

Trani
- Full name: ASD Soccer Trani
- Founded: 1928
- Ground: Nicola Lapi, Trani, Italy
- Capacity: 8,401
- President: Luciano Pace
- Manager: Fabio Moscelli
- League: Promozione Puglia
- 2025–26: 1st
Home colours	Away colours

ASD Soccer Trani is an Italian association football club, based in Trani, Apulia.

In its history, it has participated for two years in a row in the Italian Serie B (Italy second division); the best place it achieved was the 15th position, in season 1964/65.

== History ==
=== From 1928 to 1948 ===
The club was founded in 1928 as U.S. Tranese and refounded in 1938 as S.S. Trani that was renamed Polisportiva Trani in 1948.

=== Polisportiva Trani ===
==== Serie B ====
Polisportiva Trani was promoted to Serie B on 24 May 1964, following the draw 1–1 with Chieti in the last day of Serie C 1963–1964. At the period of playing in Serie B achieved some memorable victories over teams like Parma, Naples, Palermo, Livorno, as well as a 1–0 derby win against Bari in 1964–65. In the next year Polisportiva Trani took the 20th place with 30 points in the league table and as a result was relegated back to Serie C.

==== Serie C2 and failure ====
In 1987–88 they won first place in Group H of Campionato Interregionale, thus winning promotion to Serie C2. In that year they also won the trophy Trani Jacinto, tournament forerunner of Scudetto Dilettanti (established since 1992) playing among the group winners of the entire Interregionale. By defeating Poggibonsi in Senigallia, the Trani promoted as champions of Interregionale. Polisportiva Trani played in Serie C2 for eight years and, in 1991–92, blatantly missed promotion in Serie C1 to Campania-Puteolana. The Polisportiva Trani's subsequent years could not be repeated, and in 1995–96 finished in last place and relegated with only 13 points in the standings. The next year the team suffered another relegation. In the 1997–98 season the Polisportiva Trani didn't registered for the championship of Eccellenza Apulia and as a result its sports title was renounced.

=== A.S. Fortis Trani ===
==== Refoundation ====

Two years later, in 1999, Fortis Trani was founded, thanks to a group of nine businessmen. To avoid starting from a very low category, in June of that year, acquired the sports title of Libertas Barletta which was playing in Promozione Apulia. The group of entrepreneurs, despite the strong desire to bring Trani in the higher classes, after two promotions and two seasons in Serie D, the team was relegated back to Promozione. The return to Eccellenza was achieved in 2008–2009, after winning the regional playoffs.

==== The return to Serie D ====
Fortis Trani finished second in Eccellenza Apulia in 2009–10 season and after winning in national playoffs was promoted to Serie D.

The next year in Serie D the club finished in 7th place.

In the 2011–12 season in Serie D Fortis Trani came in 11th place.

In summer 2013 the club was not able to enter 2013–14 Eccellenza, after the relegation and was liquidated.

=== Second refoundation ===
Later in 2013 it acquired Terlizzi Calcio (which played in 2012–13 Eccellenza Puglia) and moved, becoming USC Trani. It now plays in the same league.

=== A.S.D. Soccer Trani (from 2023) ===
Since 2023, the ASD Soccer bunker Trani (a local youth team) acquired the sporting title from Vigor Trani. In season 2025/26, the team was able to win the Group A of Promozione Puglia league. They also won the regional Coppa Italia in the same season (defeating Squinzano in the final). From the 2026/27 season, it will compete in the Eccellenza league.

== Colors and badge ==
The colors of the club were light blue and white.

== Stadium ==
It played at the Stadio Nicola Lapi, in Trani, Italy with capacity of 8,401 places.
