= San Nicolò a Tordino =

Coordinates: 42°41′43″N 13°47′24″E

- Frazione
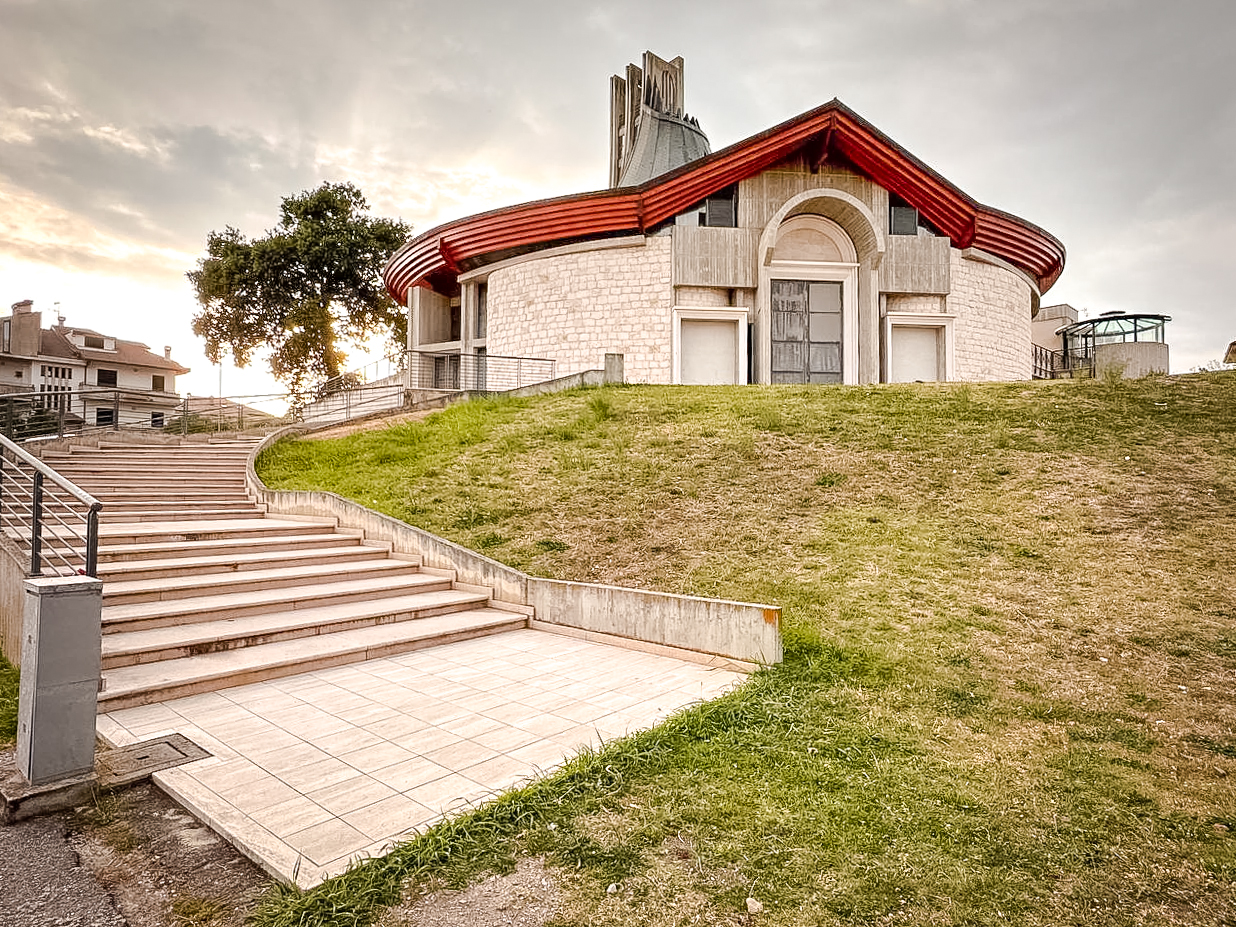
- Interactive map of San Nicolò a Tordino
- Country: Italy
- Region: Abruzzo
- Province: Teramo
- Commune: Teramo
- Time zone: UTC+1 (CET)
  - Summer (DST): UTC+2 (CEST)

San Nicolò a Tordino is a frazione in the Province of Teramo in the Abruzzo region of Italy.
