= USD Calcio Rudianese =

Italian football club

Calcio Rudianese
- Full name: Unione Sportiva Oratorio Calcio Rudianese
- Founded: 1961 (as Rudianese); 2011 (as U.S.O. Calcio Rudianese)
- Ground: Stadio Comunale, Rudiano, Italy
- Chairman: Gianfranco Guerini
- Manager: Gabriele Dotti
- League: Promozione Lombardy/D
- 2011–12: Serie D/B, 12th
Home colours	Away colours

Unione Sportiva Oratorio Calcio Rudianese (where Calcio indicates the country of the old U.S.O. Calcio) is an Italian association football club located in Rudiano, Lombardy. It currently plays in Promozione Lombardy.

== History ==
The club was founded in 1961 as A.C.D. Rudianese.

In 2010 it is promoted to Serie D from Eccellenza Lombardy and joins forces with U.S.O. Calcio and A.S.D. Urago D'Oglio, but only in the summer 2011 the merger becomes official refounding its with the current denomination.

After the end of the 2011–12 season, it did not appeal against the exclusion of Federal Council and it is relegated to Promozione Lombardy.

== Colors and badge ==
The colors of the club are yellow and green.
