= USD Caravaggio =

Italian football club

Caravaggio
- Full name: Unione Sportiva Dilettantistica Caravaggio
- Founded: 1958; 2009 (refoundation)
- Ground: Stadio Comunale, Caravaggio, Italy
- Capacity: 3,000
- Chairman: Luigi Mombrini
- Manager: Marco Bolis
- League: Serie D/B
- 2018–19: Serie D/B, 11th
- Website: http://www.usdcaravaggio.it
Home colours	Away colours

Unione Sportiva Dilettantistica Caravaggio is an Italian association football club, based in Caravaggio, Lombardy. Caravaggio currently plays in Serie D.

== History ==
The club was founded in 1958 after the merger between U.S. Veltro and Olimpia.

At the end of the 2007–08 season, Caravaggio merged with U.S.O. Calcio, a team from the nearby town of Calcio, forming U.S. Calcio Caravaggese.

In the summer of 2009, the representatives of Caravaggio left the Calcio Caravaggese after disagreements over team management, refounding Caravaggio with the current denomination. In the season 2009–10 the team played in Serie D, after having acquired the sports title of Pedrengo Calcio, but it was immediately relegated to Eccellenza Lombardy.

At the end of the 2011–12 season the team was promoted from Eccellenza Lombardy to Serie D.

== Colors and badge ==
The team's colors are white and red.

== Current squad ==
- usdcaravaggio.it

== Honours ==
- Coppa Italia Lombardia:
  - Winners 1: 2011–12
