= ASD Real Nocera Superiore =

Italian football club

Real Nocera
- Full name: Associazione Sportiva Dilettantistica Real Nocera Superiore
- Founded: 2009
- Dissolved: 2012
- Ground: Stadio Karol Wojtyla, Pecorari, Nocera Superiore, Italy
- Capacity: 1,200
- 2011–12: Serie D/H, 15th
Home colours	Away colours

A.S.D. Real Nocera Superiore (usually referred to as Real Nocera) was an Italian association football club located in Nocera Superiore, Campania.

== History ==
The club was founded in 2009 as Vis Nocera Superiore, after the club Baronissi moved to Nocera Superiore from its namesake town.

At the end of the 2009–10 Eccellenza season, the club took the current denomination and asked to be admitted to the 2010–11 Serie D. This was initially rejected, but the decision was reverted by the CONI Sports Court, though Real Nocera was entered to the league after the first day was already played.

In the season 2011–12 it was relegated to Eccellenza.

In summer 2012 its sports title of Eccellenza was transferred to Angri and so it was dissolved.

== Colors and badge ==
Its colors were red and black.
