= Roberto Malotti =

Italian football manager

Roberto Malotti is an Italian football manager who is last known to have managed Grosseto.

== Career ==
In 2015, Malotti was appointed manager of Italian fourth tier side Sangiovannese but left to prioritize his restaurant business. In 2016, he was appointed manager of Prato.

In 2021, Malotti was appointed manager of Italian fourth tier club Montevarchi, helping them earn promotion to the Italian third tier.

In 2024 he the manager of italian fourth tier club Grosseto calcio, helping them earn promotion to the third tier.
