= US Palestrina 1919 =

Italian football club

Palestrina
- Full name: Unione Sportiva Palestrina 1919
- Nickname: Il Verdearancio
- Founded: 1919; 107 years ago as, Unione Sportiva Palestrina; 2012; 14 years ago as, San Basilio Palestrina (refounded); 2013; 13 years ago as, US Palestrina 1919
- Ground: Stadio Comunale Antonio Sbardella, Palestrina, Lazio, Italy
- Capacity: 600
- Chairman: Augusto Cristofari
- Manager: Giancarlo Oddi
- League: Eccellenza Lazio
- 2014–15: 14th (group G; relegation play-off)
Home colours	Away colours

Unione Sportiva Palestrina 1919 is an Italian association football club, based in Palestrina but playing in the San Basilio district of Rome, Lazio. The club currently plays in Eccellenza Lazio.

== History ==
=== San Basilio Palestrina ===
The club was founded in 2012 after obtaining the sports title of Serie D club U.S. Palestrina 1919, based in Palestrina. The owners of the company are Augusto Cristofari, its former president, together with other Roman entrepreneurs.

=== U.S. Palestrina 1919 ===
In summer 2013 the club changed its name back to U.S. Palestrina 1919.

== Colours and badge ==
The team's colors are orange, green and white

== Stadium ==
It plays at the Centro Sportivo Francesca Gianni, Rome.
