= Pianezza =

- Comune
- Comune di Pianezza
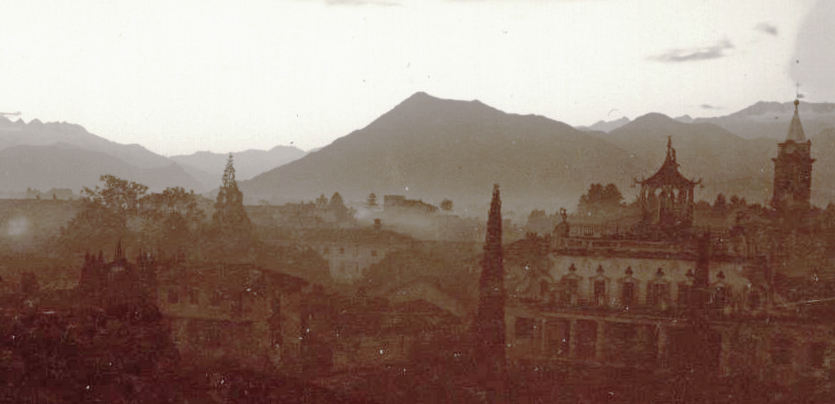
- View of Pianezza, 1905

- Coat of arms

- Location within Italy Location within Piedmont
- Coordinates: 45°6′N 7°33′E
- Country: Italy
- Region: Piedmont
- Metropolitan city: Turin (TO)

Government
  - Mayor: Roberto Signoriello

Area
  - Total: 16.5 km^{2} (6.4 sq mi)
- Elevation: 365 m (1,198 ft)

Population (31 December 2018)
  - Total: 15,391
  - Density: 933/km^{2} (2,420/sq mi)
- Demonym: Pianezzesi
- Time zone: UTC+1 (CET)
  - Summer (DST): UTC+2 (CEST)
- Postal code: 10044
- Dialing code: 011
- Patron saint: Madonna della Stella
- Saint day: September 12
- Website: Official website

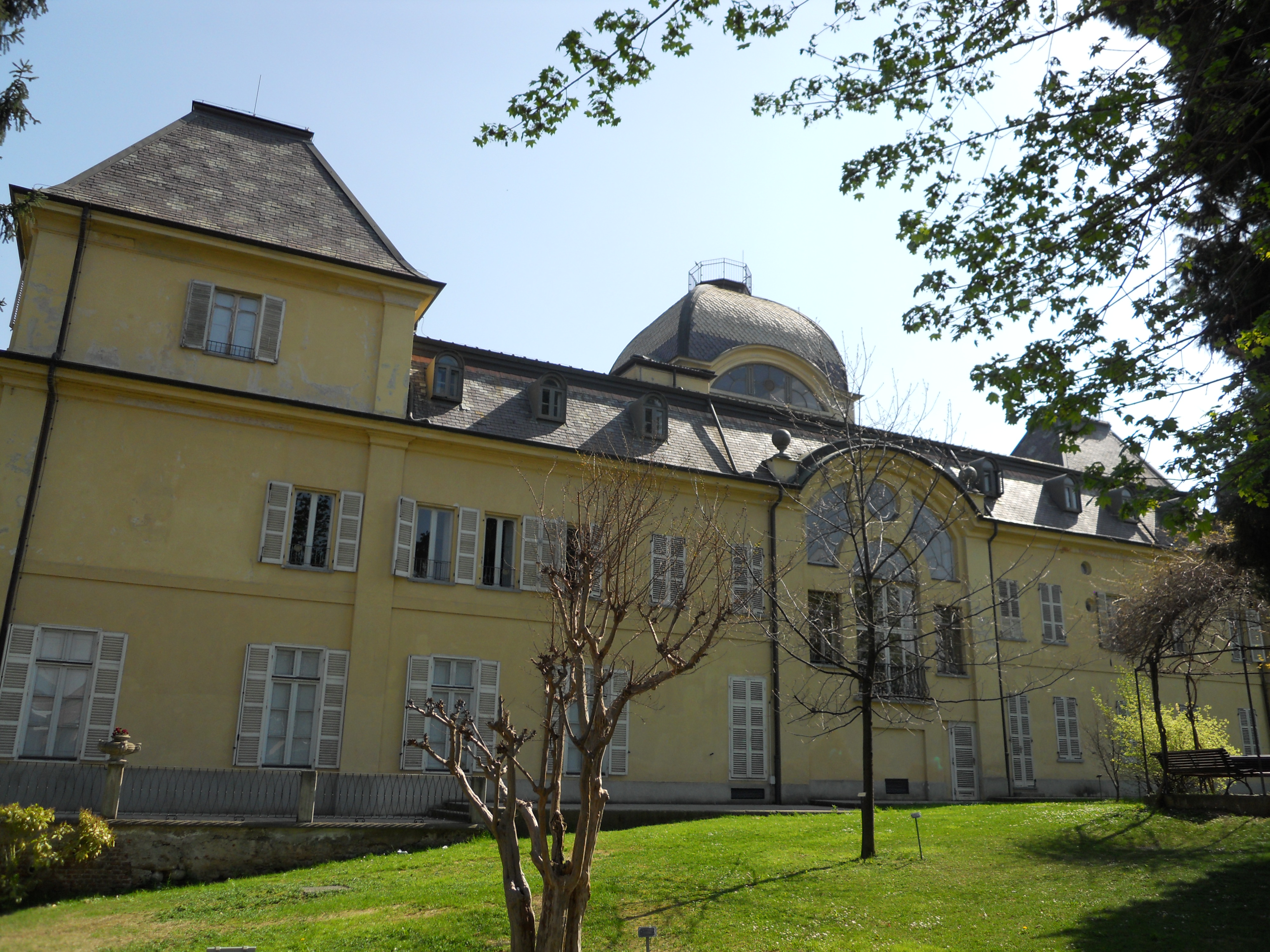
Villa Leumann, house of the town hall.

Pianezza is a comune (municipality) in the Metropolitan City of Turin in the Italian region of Piedmont, located about 12 kilometres (7 mi) northwest of Turin.
