= Miglianico =

- Comune
- Comune di Miglianico
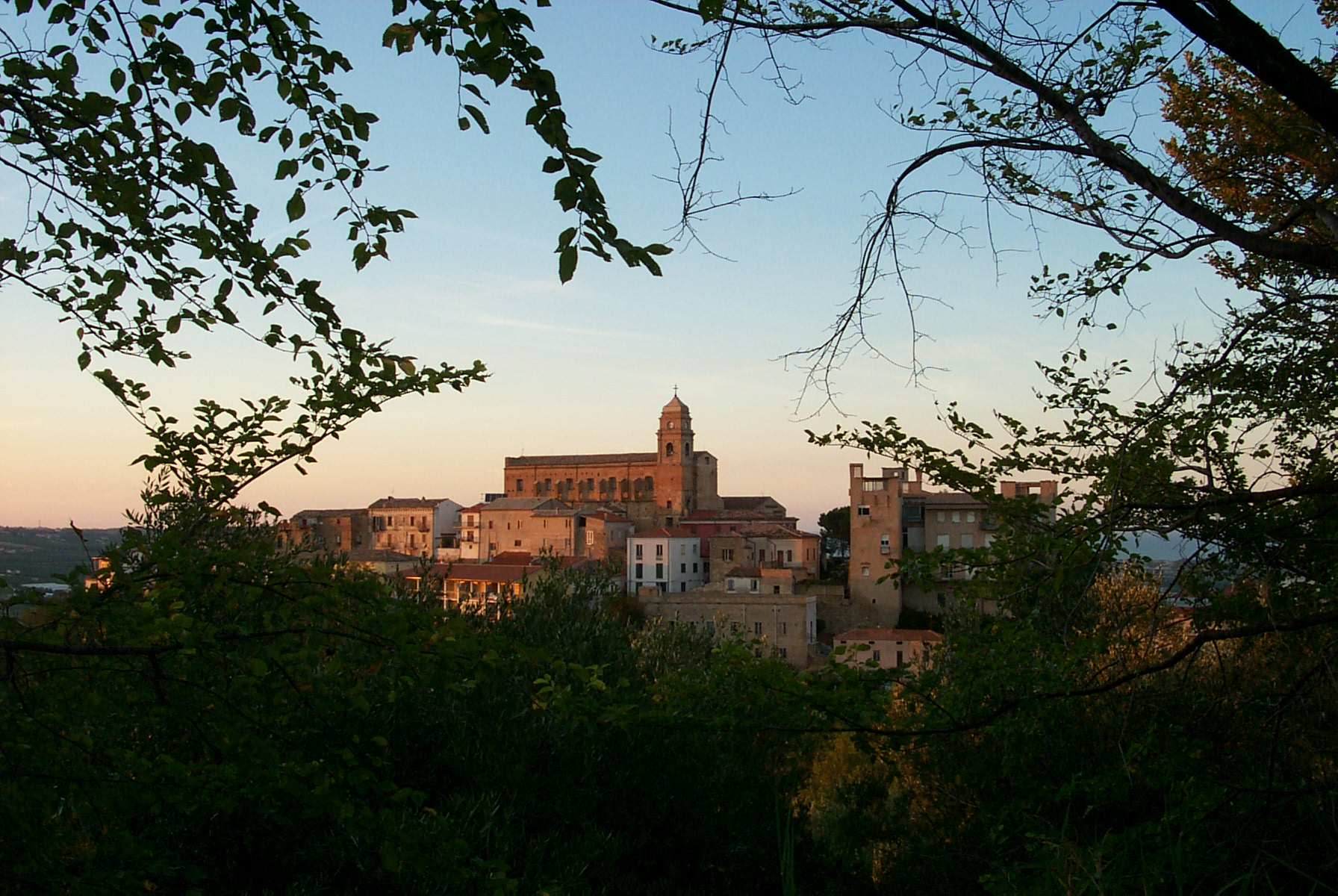
- Miglianico at the sunset

- Location within Italy Location within Abruzzo
- Coordinates: 42°21′30″N 14°17′30″E
- Country: Italy
- Region: Abruzzo
- Province: Chieti (CH)
- Frazioni: Cagialone, Cerreto, Cerreto superiore, Cerrone, Ciummare, Collemarino, Elcine, Foreste, Montupoli, Piane San Pantaleone, Quattro Strade, Valle Sant'Angelo

Area
  - Total: 22 km^{2} (8.5 sq mi)
- Elevation: 136 m (446 ft)

Population (2004)
  - Total: 4,529
  - Density: 210/km^{2} (530/sq mi)
- Demonym: Miglianichesi
- Time zone: UTC+1 (CET)
  - Summer (DST): UTC+2 (CEST)
- Postal code: 66010
- Dialing code: 0871
- Patron saint: St. Pantaleon
- Saint day: 27 July
- Website: Official website

Miglianico (Abruzzese: Mijàneche, Mijàneceis) a town and comune of the province of Chieti in the Abruzzo region of Italy.

Miglianico is situated in the foothills of the Italian Apennine Mountains.

== History ==
Miglianico developed as a burgh around the early medieval rocca (Castle), around the 10th century AD.

During the World War II, Miglianico was occupied by German forces attempting to hold ground as the American push by General Mark Clark advanced north from Southern Italy. Homes of residents were taken over by German units and used to quarter soldiers and served as command posts. Miglianico and the surrounding area was heavily damaged by Allied carpet bombing during 1944. Many of its residents fled to and lived in caves for months for safety.

== Main sights ==
Sights include the Masci Castle (15th century), and the churches of St. Rocco and St. Pantaleone (the patron saint of the town).

== Culture ==
The Festival of St. Pantaleone is celebrated every year on 27 July, and is the patron saint of doctors and obstetricians.

Miglianico is also host to the Miglianico Tour foot race each year in August.

== Economy ==
The town economy is predominantly agricultural; wine grapes and olives are its primary crops.

== People ==
- Danny Biasone (Miglianico 1909 - Syracuse 1992)

== See also ==
- Abruzzo (wine)
