= Boville Ernica =

- Comune
- Comune di Boville Ernica
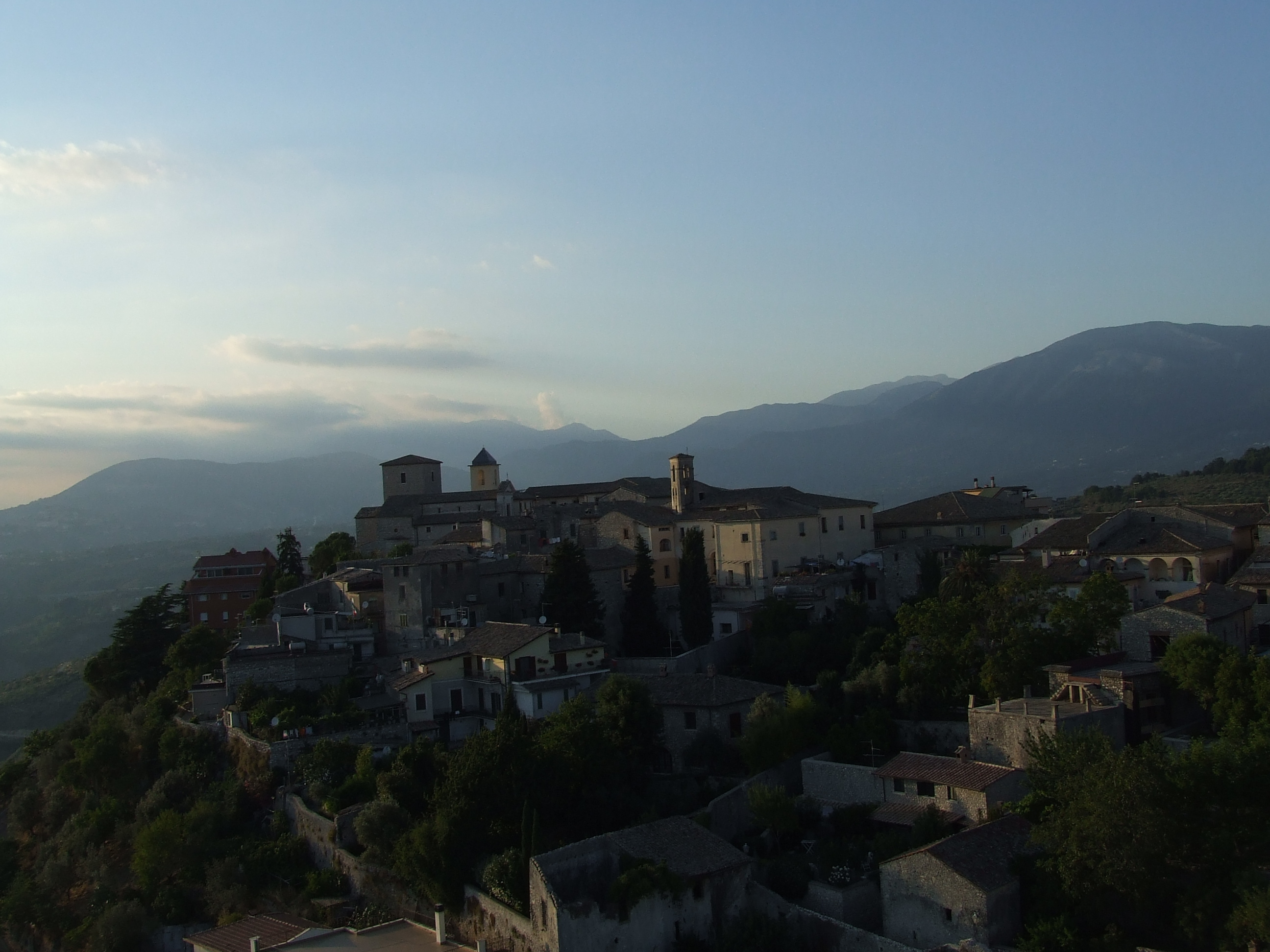
- View of Boville Ernica

- Location within Italy Location within Lazio
- Coordinates: 41°39′N 13°28′E
- Country: Italy
- Region: Lazio
- Province: Frosinone (FR)

Government
  - Mayor: Enzo Perciballi

Area
  - Total: 28 km^{2} (11 sq mi)
- Elevation: 450 m (1,480 ft)

Population (30 November 2016)
  - Total: 8,622
  - Density: 310/km^{2} (800/sq mi)
- Time zone: UTC+1 (CET)
  - Summer (DST): UTC+2 (CEST)
- Postal code: 03022
- Dialing code: 0775
- Patron saint: St. Pietro Ispano and St. Rocco
- Saint day: March 11
- Website: Official website

Boville Ernica is a town and comune in the province of Frosinone, Lazio, Italy. It is located over the summit of a steep hill commanding the Liri, Cosa and Sacco valleys. It is one of I Borghi più belli d'Italia ("The most beautiful villages of Italy").

== History ==
The town's history stretches back to pre-Roman times, which is testified by its numerous archaeological findings and prehistoric Pelasgic walls. Its primordial name, "Bauco", recalls the ancient agricultural worship of the god Bove, symbol of fertility. In the archaeological area of Monte Fico, where once stood a temple dedicated to this divinity, there have come to light votive statuettes featuring oxen.

Boville Ernica was once situated on the plains below its present site, but after the Saracen and Hungarian invasions (9th–10th centuries), its population moved to the higher levels of Monte Fico, where the ancient center was transformed into one of the most fortified towns in the region.

== Main sights ==
In addition to the Pelasgic walls, sights include the castle and its Medieval walls having as many as 18 turrets and towers (alternating as round and square shapes), all standing completely intact.

Boville is also home to many Renaissance palaces and churches. Among them is the church of San Pietro Ispano, erected in the 12th century over the grotto in which for many years the Patron Saint lived. The church still conserves an early-Christian sarcophagus, two reliquaries, belonging to S. Pietro Ispano and S. Lucy, a chapel once belonging to the noble family of the Simoncelli, a Sansovino basrelief and a mosaic attributed to Giotto.

== Personalities ==
- Vincenzo Paglia (born 1945), Roman Catholic bishop
