= Eccellenza =

Italian association football league

- Organising body: Lega Nazionale Dilettanti's; Regional Committees
- Founded: 1991; 35 years ago
- Country: Italy
- Confederation: UEFA
- Divisions: 28
- Number of clubs: 474
- Level on pyramid: 5
- Promotion to: Serie D
- Relegation to: Promozione
- League cup: Coppa Italia Dilettanti
- Website: www.lnd.it

The Eccellenza (Italian: [ettʃelˈlɛntsa], transl. "Excellence") is the fifth level (since 2014–15) of Italian football. It is a regional league, composed of 28 divisions divided geographically. All 20 regions are represented by at least one division, except for Piedmont and Aosta Valley which share 2 divisions; Veneto, Tuscany, Sicily, Emilia-Romagna, Lazio and Campania also have 2 divisions each, while the region of Lombardy has 3 divisions.

== Promotion and relegation ==
After the regular season is completed, the first-placed team for each division is automatically promoted to Serie D.

Each division also admits one other team to participate in national playoffs that take place in late May and early June. Some divisions select the second-placed team directly, while other divisions schedule a series of divisional playoff games among the top teams in that division in order to determine the national playoff participant. Once the 28 national playoff participants are finalized, they are paired in a double-leg series, and the 14 winners participate in a second round double-leg series. The 7 winners of the second round are promoted to Serie D as well. One more place to Serie D is allowed to the winner of the "Coppa Italia Dilettanti" (Amateur Italian Cup), a year-long competition between all the national teams of both Eccellenza and Promozione (the lower division). In all, 36 teams are promoted to replace the 36 teams relegated down from Serie D.

- 28 division winners
- 7 national playoff winners
- 1 Coppa Italiana Dilettanti winner

The relegation rules are decided regionally, but there are usually three teams relegated from each division.

== Eccellenza by region ==
- Eccellenza Abruzzo - 1 Division
- Eccellenza Apulia - 1 Division
- Eccellenza Basilicata - 1 Division
- Eccellenza Calabria - 1 Division
- Eccellenza Campania - 2 Divisions
- Eccellenza Emilia-Romagna - 2 Divisions
- Eccellenza Friuli-Venezia Giulia - 1 Division
- Eccellenza Lazio - 2 Divisions
- Eccellenza Liguria - 1 Division
- Eccellenza Lombardy - 3 Divisions
- Eccellenza Marche - 1 Division
- Eccellenza Molise - 1 Division
- Eccellenza Piedmont-Aosta Valley - 2 Divisions
- Eccellenza Sardinia - 1 Division
- Eccellenza Sicily - 2 Divisions
- Eccellenza Tuscany - 2 Divisions
- Eccellenza Trentino-Alto Adige/Südtirol - 1 Division
- Eccellenza Umbria - 1 Division
- Eccellenza Veneto - 2 Divisions

== See also ==
- Italian football league system
