= 2008–09 Eccellenza =

This is a list of division winners and playoff matches in the regionally organized Eccellenza 2008–2009, which is the 6th level of Italian football. A total of 36 teams are promoted to Serie D for the 2009–10 season.

The first-placed team from each of the 28 divisions is promoted directly. The seven winners of the national playoffs are also promoted. Finally, the 36th spot is reserved for the winner of the Coppa Italia Dilettanti. This year, the winner was Virtus Casarano, which also won direct promotion as divisional winner in the region of Apuglia, thus Castel Rigone of Eccellenza Umbria won promotion as Coppa Italia Dilettanti runners-up.

In addition, L'Aquila were handed special promotion from the Federation as they were unable to play the two remaining matches following a massive earthquake in the city.

== Division winners ==
This is the list of final division winners in the regular season phase:

	Region/Division	Winners
1	Abruzzo	Miglianico
2	Apulia	Virtus Casarano
3	Basilicata	Pisticci
4	Calabria	Sambiase
5	Campania – A	Casertana
6	Campania – B	Forza e Coraggio Benevento
7	Emilia-Romagna – A	Dorando Pietri Carpi
8	Emilia-Romagna – B	Valleverde Riccione
9	Friuli-Venezia Giulia	Manzanese
10	Lazio – A	Pomezia
11	Lazio – B	Virtus Latina
12	Liguria	Borgorosso Arenzano
13	Lombardy – A	Vigevano
14	Lombardy – B	Ponte San Pietro Isola
15	Lombardy – C	Pedrengo
16	Marche	Bikkembergs Fossombrone
17	Molise	Bojano
18	Piedmont & Aosta Valley – A	Acqui
19	Piedmont & Aosta Valley – B	Borgosesia
20	Sardinia	Sanluri
21	Sicily – A	Mazara
22	Sicily – B	Milazzo
23	Tuscany – A	Monteriggioni
24	Tuscany – B	Rosignano Sei Rose
25	Trentino-Alto Adige/Südtirol	Porfido Albiano
26	Umbria	Group Città di Castello
27	Veneto – A	Villafranca Veronese
28	Veneto – B	Adriese

== Regional playoffs ==
The following regional committees did not organize playoffs and instead directly admitted league runners-up to the national phase:

- Emilia-Romagna A: Pallavicino
- Emilia-Romagna B: Del Conca Morciano
- Friuli-Venezia Giulia: Monfalcone
- Lazio A: Latina
- Lazio B: Fondi
- Liguria: Loanesi San Francesco
- Trentino-Alto Adige/Südtirol: Maia Alta Obermais
- Veneto A: Legnago Salus
- Veneto B: LiaPiave

=== Abruzzo ===
Differently than with other regions, the Abruzzo phase involved teams from 3rd to 6th place, due to second-placed L'Aquila being promoted by deliberation of the Lega Nazionale Dilettantistica ("Amateur National League"), as the team was declared unable to complete the season due to the massive earthquake that struck the city in April.

Playoff semifinals

Games held on May 10 and 17, 2009

Team 1	Agg.	Team 2	1st leg	2nd leg
Penne	1–3	San Nicola Sulmona	0–1	1–2
San Nicolò	0–1	Castel di Sangro	0–0	0–1

Playoff final

Game held on May 23, 2009 in Celano (neutral field)

Team 1	Score	Team 2
San Nicola Sulmona	1–0(aet)	Castel di Sangro

Teams admitted to regional playoffs
Position	Team	Points
3rd	San Nicola Sulmona	62
4th	Castel di Sangro	60
5th	San Nicolò	58
6th	Penne	56

=== Apulia ===
Playoff semifinals

Games held on April 19 and 26, 2009

Team 1	Agg.	Team 2	1st leg	2nd leg
A.Stefanizzi Sogliano	0–2	Liberty Bari	0–1	0–1
Copertino	1–2	Ostuni	0–2	1–0

Playoff finals

Games held on May 3 and 10, 2009

Team 1	Agg.	Team 2	1st leg	2nd leg
Ostuni	3–2	Liberty Bari	2–0	1–2

Teams admitted to regional playoffs
Position	Team	Points
2nd	Liberty Bari	70
3rd	Ostuni	59
4th	Copertino	59
5th	A.Stefanizzi Sogliano	57

=== Basilicata ===
Playoff semifinals

Games held on May 6 and 10, 2009

Team 1	Agg.	Team 2	1st leg	2nd leg
Policoro 2000	3–7	Angelo Cristofaro	0–4	3–3
Ruggiero di Lauria	2–4	Murese 2000	0–1	2–3

Playoff final

Game held on May 16, 2009 in Picerno (neutral field)

Team 1	Score	Team 2
Angelo Cristofaro	1–0	Murese 2000

Teams admitted to regional playoffs
Position	Team	Points
2nd	Angelo Cristofaro	66
3rd	Murese 2000	62
4th	Ruggiero di Lauria	57
5th	Policoro 2000	47

=== Calabria ===
Playoff semifinals

Games held on May 3 and 10, 2009

Team 1	Agg.	Team 2	1st leg	2nd leg
Praia	5–3	Omega Bagaladi	1–1	4–2
Palmese	1–3	Rossano	0–1	1–2

Playoff finals

Games held on May 13 and 17, 2009

Team 1	Agg.	Team 2	1st leg	2nd leg
Praia	1–3	Rossano	0–1	1–2

Teams admitted to regional playoffs
Position	Team	Points
2nd	Omega Bagaladi	58
3rd	Rossano	54
4th	Palmese	50
5th	Praia	49

=== Campania A ===
Playoff semifinals

Games held on May 10, 2009

Team 1	Score	Team 2
Alba Sannio	1–1(b)	Gladiator
Atletico Nola	2–1	Arzanese

Playoff final

Game held on May 17, 2009

Team 1	Score	Team 2
Alba Sannio	0–2	Atletico Nola

Teams admitted to regional playoffs
Position	Team	Points
2nd	Alba Sannio	59
3rd	Atletico Nola	55
4th	Gladiator	48
5th	Arzanese	46

=== Campania B ===
Playoff semifinals

Games held on May 10, 2009

Team 1	Score	Team 2
Battipagliese	0–2(aet)	Ebolitana
Hirpinia	2–3	Striano

Playoff final

Game held on May 17, 2009

Team 1	Score	Team 2
Striano	1–1(b)	Ebolitana

Teams admitted to regional playoffs
Position	Team	Points
2nd	Battipagliese	68
3rd	Hirpinia	51
4th	Striano	48
5th	Ebolitana	47

=== Lombardy A ===
Playoff semifinals

Games held on May 10, 2009

Team 1	Score	Team 2
Caronnese	0–1(aet)	Naviglio Trezzano
Sancolombano	2–1	Gavirate

Playoff final

Game held on May 16, 2009

Team 1	Score	Team 2
Sancolombano	3–2(aet)	Naviglio Trezzano

Teams admitted to regional playoffs
Position	Team	Points
2nd	Caronnese	72
3rd	Sancolombano	59
4th	Gavirate	54
5th	Naviglio Trezzano	53

=== Lombardy B ===
Playoff semifinals

Games held on May 10, 2009

Team 1	Score	Team 2
Seregno	1–1(b)	Naviglio Trezzano
Mariano	0–3	Cantù San Paolo

Playoff final

Game held on May 16, 2009

Team 1	Score	Team 2
Seregno	0–2	Cantù San Paolo

Teams admitted to regional playoffs
Position	Team	Points
2nd	Seregno	64
3rd	Mariano	62
4th	Cantù San Paolo	58
5th	Villa d'Adda	58

=== Lombardy C ===
Playoff semifinals

Games held on May 10, 2009

Team 1	Score	Team 2
Sarnico	1–3	Castegnato
Palazzolo	1–0	Casale Vidolasco

Playoff final

Game held on May 16, 2009

Team 1	Score	Team 2
Palazzolo	3–2	Castegnato

Teams admitted to regional playoffs
Position	Team	Points
2nd	Sarnico	67
3rd	Palazzolo	55
4th	Casale Vidolasco	52
5th	Castegnato	50

=== Marche ===
Playoff semifinals

Games held on May 3 and 10, 2009

Team 1	Agg.	Team 2	1st leg	2nd leg
Castelfrettese	1–1(b)	Civitanovese	0–0	1–1
Fortitudo Fabriano	1–1(b)	Piano San Lazzaro	1–0	0–1

Playoff final

Game held on May 17, 2009 in Ancona (neutral field)

Team 1	Score	Team 2
Civitanovese	2–1	Piano San Lazzaro

Teams admitted to regional playoffs
Position	Team	Points
2nd	Civitanovese	64
3rd	Piano San Lazzaro	63
4th	Fortitudo Fabriano	61
5th	Castelfrettese	57

=== Molise ===
Playoff semifinals

Games held on May 3 and 10, 2009

Team 1	Agg.	Team 2	1st leg	2nd leg
Petacciato	3–4	Montenero	1–2	2–2
Termoli	3–6	Sesto Campano	2–3	1–3

Playoff final

Game held on May 17, 2009

Team 1	Score	Team 2
Montenero	2–0	Sesto Campano

Teams admitted to regional playoffs
Position	Team	Points
2nd	Montenero	59
3rd	Sesto Campano	58
4th	Termoli	51
5th	Petacciato	49

=== Piedmont & Aosta Valley A ===
Playoff semifinals

Games held on April 26 and 29, 2009

Team 1	Agg.	Team 2	1st leg	2nd leg
Piombese	1–5	Gozzano	0–1	1–4

Playoff finals

Games held on May 3 and 10, 2009

Team 1	Agg.	Team 2	1st leg	2nd leg
Gozzano	2–3	Settimo	0–2	2–1

Teams admitted to regional playoffs
Position	Team	Points
2nd	Settimo	52
3rd	Gozzano	49
4th	Piombese	48

=== Piedmont & Aosta Valley B ===
Playoff semifinals

Games held on April 26 and 29, 2009

Team 1	Agg.	Team 2	1st leg	2nd leg
Castellazzo Bormida	2–2(b)	Busca	2–2	0–0

Playoff finals

Games held on May 3 and 10, 2009

Team 1	Agg.	Team 2	1st leg	2nd leg
Busca	0–3	Aquanera	0–2	0–1

Teams admitted to regional playoffs
Position	Team	Points
2nd	Aquanera	64
3rd	Busca	50
4th	Castellazzo Bormida	48

=== Sardinia ===
Playoff semifinals

Games held on May 3 and 10, 2009

Team 1	Agg.	Team 2	1st leg	2nd leg
Selargius	6–3	Samassi	2–1	4–2
San Teodoro	2–2(b)	Portotorres	1–0	0–1

Playoff final

Game held on May 17, 2009 in Terralba (neutral field)

Team 1	Score	Team 2
Portotorres	0–2	Selargius

Teams admitted to regional playoffs
Position	Team	Points
2nd	Samassi	57
3rd	Portotorres	57
4th	San Teodoro	52
5th	Selargius	51

=== Sicily A ===
Playoff semifinals

Games held on April 19, 2009 in Mazara del Vallo and Alcamo (neutral fields)

Team 1	Score	Team 2
Licata	1–0	Marsala S.C.
Splendore Villabate	(b)0–0	Bagheria

Playoff final

Game held on April 26, 2009 in Campobello di Mazara (neutral field)

Team 1	Score	Team 2
Licata	1–0	Splendore Villabate

Teams admitted to regional playoffs
Position	Team	Points
2nd	Licata	55
3rd	Splendore Villabate	53
4th	Bagheria	46
5th	Marsala S.C.	46

=== Sicily B ===
Playoff semifinals

Games held on April 19, 2009 in Belpasso and Caltanissetta (neutral fields)

Team 1	Score	Team 2
Acireale	(b)0–0	Due Torri
Ragusa	(b)1–1	Camaro

Playoff final

Game held on April 26, 2009 in Mazara del Vallo (neutral field)

Team 1	Score	Team 2
Acireale	1–0	Ragusa

Teams admitted to regional playoffs
Position	Team	Points
2nd	Acireale	60
3rd	Ragusa	54
4th	Camaro	50
5th	Due Torri	49

=== Tuscany A ===
Playoff semifinals

Games held on April 26 and May 3, 2009

Team 1	Agg.	Team 2	1st leg	2nd leg
Santa Maria a Montecalvoli	2–3	Pietrasanta Marina	1–1	1–2
Camaiore	1–3	Borgo a Buggiano	1–2	0–1

Playoff finals

Games held on May 10 and 17, 2009

Team 1	Agg.	Team 2	1st leg	2nd leg
Borgo a Buggiano	3–1	Pietrasanta Marina	1–0	2–1

Teams admitted to regional playoffs
Position	Team	Points
2nd	Pietrasanta Marina	59
3rd	Borgo a Buggiano	58
4th	Camaiore	51
5th	Santa Maria a Montecalvoli	49

=== Tuscany B ===
Playoff semifinals

Games held on April 26 and May 3, 2009

Team 1	Agg.	Team 2	1st leg	2nd leg
Pianese	6–0	Sinalunghese	1–0	5–0
Montalcino	1–2	Baldaccio Bruni	0–0	1–2

Playoff finals

Games held on May 10 and 17, 2009

Team 1	Agg.	Team 2	1st leg	2nd leg
Pianese	1–1(b)	Baldaccio Bruni	1–1	0–0

Teams admitted to regional playoffs
Position	Team	Points
2nd	Sinalunghese	59
3rd	Baldaccio Bruni	58
4th	Montalcino	51
5th	Pianese	49

=== Umbria ===
Umbria admitted teams from 3rd to 6th place into playoffs, due to league runners-up Castel Rigone being promoted directly into Serie D as Coppa Italia Dilettanti finalists.

Playoff semifinals

Games held on May 3 and 10, 2009

Team 1	Agg.	Team 2	1st leg	2nd leg
Narnese	0–2	Todi	0–1	0–1
Trestina	1–1(b)	Bastia	1–0	0–1

Playoff final

Game held on May 17, 2009 in Ponte San Giovanni (neutral field)

Team 1	Score	Team 2
Todi	1–2	Bastia

Teams admitted to regional playoffs
Position	Team	Points
3rd	Todi	60
4th	Bastia	54
5th	Trestina	53
6th	Narnese	52

== National playoffs ==
National playoffs involve 28 teams and assign 7 promotion spots. They are divided in two different rounds.

=== First round ===
Played on May 24 and 31, 2009

	Team 1	Agg.	Team 2	1st leg	2nd leg
A|	Settimo (Piedmont A)	(ag)2–2	Maia Alta Obermais (Trentino A.A.)	1–0	1–2
B|	LiaPiave (Veneto B)	2–0	Monfalcone (Friuli V.G.)	1–0	1–0
C|	Palazzolo (Lombardy C)	(aet)5–3	Sancolombano (Lombardy A)	2–1	3–2
D|	Cantù San Paolo (Lombardy B)	2–1	Loanesi San Francesco (Liguria)	1–1	1–0
E|	Aquanera (Piedmont B)	1–0	Legnago Salus (Veneto A)	1–0	0–0
F|	Latina (Lazio A)	6–4	Del Conca Morciano (Emilia-Romagna B)	3–1	3–3
G|	Bastia (Umbria)	2–4	Fondi (Lazio B)	2–3	0–1
H|	Baldaccio Bruni (Tuscany B)	1–3	Borgo a Buggiano (Tuscany A)	1–2	0–1
I|	San Nicola Sulmona (Abruzzo)	0–3	Selargius (Sardinia)	0–3	0–0
L|	Pallavicino (Emilia-Romagna A)	2–3	Civitanovese (Marche)	2–2	0–1
M|	Ostuni (Apulia)	4–2	Acireale (Sicily B)	0–1	4–1
N|	Striano (Campania B)	3–5(aet)	Licata (Sicily A)	1–1	2–4
O|	Angelo Cristofaro (Basilicata)	2–4	Montenero (Molise)	2–3	0–1
P|	Rossano (Calabria)	(ag)2–2	Atletico Nola (Campania A)	1–0	1–2

=== Second round ===
Played on June 7 and 14, 2009; Match #5 played on June 14 and 21, 2009

	Team 1	Agg.	Team 2	1st leg	2nd leg
1|	Palazzolo (Lombardy C)	5–1	Settimo (Piedmont A)	2–0	3–1
2|	Aquanera (Piedmont B)	3–2	LiaPiave (Veneto B)	1–1	2–1
3|	Fondi (Lazio B)	2–4	Cantù San Paolo (Lombardy B)	1–2	1–2
4|	Borgo a Buggiano (Tuscany A)	1–4	Latina (Lazio A)	0–1	1–3
5|	Selargius (Sardinia)	2–0	Civitanovese (Marche)	2–0	0–0
6|	Licata (Sicily A)	4–4 (2–5p)	Rossano (Calabria)	2–0	0–2
7|	Montenero (Molise)	0–1	Ostuni (Apulia)	0–0	0–1
