= 1994–95 Campionato Nazionale Dilettanti =

Campionato Nazionale Dilettanti
- Season: 1994–95
- Champions: Taranto
- Promoted: Grosseto; Gallaratese; Alzano Virescit; Treviso; Viterbese; Tolentino; Marsala; Catania
- Relegated: Cuneo; Pietrasanta; Certaldo; Rapallo Ruentes; Santa Teresa di Gallura; Seregno; Fermassenti; Crema; Argentana (repecheaged); Casalese; Chiari; Chiari; Sassolese San Giorgio; Montebelluna; Arco; Schio; Rovereto; Sansepolcro (repecheaged); Orvietana; Rieti; Bastia; Penne (repecheaged); Campobasso (repecheaged); Roccaravindola; Sulmona; Fiumicino; Pomezia; Mazara; Partinicaudace; Portici; Pro Salerno; Martina; Acerrana; La Sportiva Cariatese; La Sportiva Cariatese; Gangi; Comiso; Leonzio

The 1994–95 Campionato Nazionale Dilettanti was the forty-seventh edition of Serie D, at the time the fifth highest league in the Italian football league system.

A total of 162 teams contested the league, divided into nine groups (in Italian: Gironi) of 18 teams.

== League tables ==
US Triestina joined with a new amatorial club after its professional bankruptcy in Serie C1.

=== Girone A ===
| Pos | Team | Pld | W | D | L | GF | GA | GD | Pts | |
|---|---|---|---|---|---|---|---|---|---|---|
| 1 | Grosseto (P) | 34 | 18 | 13 | 3 | 49 | 20 | +29 | 49 | Promotion to Serie C2 |
| 2 | Borgosesia | 34 | 16 | 11 | 7 | 34 | 24 | +10 | 43 | |
| 3 | Savona | 34 | 11 | 16 | 7 | 32 | 22 | +10 | 38 | |
| 4 | Sestrese | 34 | 12 | 14 | 8 | 29 | 29 | 0 | 38 | |
| 5 | Colligiana | 34 | 12 | 13 | 9 | 31 | 25 | +6 | 37 | |
| 6 | Camaiore | 34 | 12 | 13 | 9 | 31 | 28 | +3 | 37 | |
| 7 | Voghera | 34 | 11 | 13 | 10 | 35 | 30 | +5 | 35 | |
| 8 | Biellese-Vigliano | 34 | 9 | 17 | 8 | 28 | 25 | +3 | 35 | |
| 9 | Nizza Millefonti | 34 | 8 | 18 | 8 | 40 | 37 | +3 | 34 | |
| 10 | Valenzana | 34 | 7 | 20 | 7 | 21 | 20 | +1 | 34 | |
| 11 | Pinerolo | 34 | 10 | 14 | 10 | 32 | 33 | −1 | 34 | |
| 12 | Châtillon Saint-Vincent Calcio | 34 | 12 | 9 | 13 | 34 | 33 | +1 | 33 | |
| 13 | Torrelaghese | 34 | 9 | 14 | 11 | 31 | 36 | −5 | 32 | |
| 14 | Moncalieri (O) | 34 | 10 | 11 | 13 | 22 | 32 | −10 | 31 | Qualification to relegation play-offs |
| 15 | Cuneo (R) | 34 | 7 | 17 | 10 | 25 | 34 | −9 | 31 | Qualification to relegation play-offs |
| 16 | Pietrasanta (R) | 34 | 8 | 15 | 11 | 23 | 28 | −5 | 31 | Relegation to Eccellenza |
| 17 | Certaldo (R) | 34 | 4 | 14 | 16 | 18 | 39 | −21 | 22 | Relegation to Eccellenza |
| 18 | Rapallo Ruentes (R) | 34 | 4 | 10 | 20 | 18 | 38 | −20 | 18 | Relegation to Eccellenza |

Updated to match(es) played on May 1995. Source: CalcioDiEccellenza.it
(O) Play-off winners; (P) Promoted; (R) Relegated

==== Relegation play-off ====
Played on 20 May 1995 in Pinerolo.

| Team 1 | Score | Team 2 |
|---|---|---|
| Moncalieri | 0–0 (3–1 p) | Cuneo |

=== Girone B ===
| Pos | Team | Pld | W | D | L | GF | GA | GD | Pts | |
|---|---|---|---|---|---|---|---|---|---|---|
| 1 | Gallaratese (E) | 34 | 21 | 7 | 6 | 57 | 22 | +35 | 49 | Promotion to Serie C2 |
| 2 | Caratese | 34 | 17 | 12 | 5 | 52 | 30 | +22 | 46 | |
| 3 | Selargius | 34 | 18 | 9 | 7 | 46 | 30 | +16 | 45 | |
| 4 | Corsico (D, R) | 34 | 15 | 14 | 5 | 45 | 15 | +30 | 44 | Relegation to Eccellenza |
| 5 | Fanfulla | 34 | 14 | 11 | 9 | 49 | 32 | +17 | 39 | |
| 6 | Mariano | 34 | 14 | 11 | 9 | 40 | 27 | +13 | 39 | |
| 7 | Calangianus | 34 | 16 | 7 | 11 | 44 | 32 | +12 | 39 | |
| 8 | Brugherio | 34 | 12 | 13 | 9 | 31 | 23 | +8 | 37 | |
| 9 | Sparta Novara | 34 | 13 | 10 | 11 | 50 | 32 | +18 | 36 | |
| 10 | Pro Patria (P) | 34 | 11 | 14 | 9 | 42 | 28 | +14 | 36 | Buyed Gallaratese |
| 11 | Castelsardo | 34 | 16 | 4 | 14 | 43 | 36 | +7 | 36 | |
| 12 | Meda | 34 | 13 | 7 | 14 | 42 | 33 | +9 | 33 | |
| 13 | Abbiategrasso | 34 | 9 | 14 | 11 | 34 | 36 | −2 | 32 | |
| 14 | Romanese (D, R) | 34 | 9 | 12 | 13 | 41 | 43 | −2 | 30 | Relegation to Eccellenza |
| 15 | Santa Teresa di Gallura (R) | 34 | 9 | 10 | 15 | 25 | 33 | −8 | 28 | Relegation to Eccellenza |
| 16 | Seregno (R) | 34 | 6 | 10 | 18 | 39 | 67 | −28 | 22 | Relegation to Eccellenza |
| 17 | Fermassenti (R) | 34 | 6 | 7 | 21 | 26 | 66 | −40 | 19 | Relegation to Eccellenza |
| 18 | Crema (Note: Crema were docked 1 point.) (R) | 34 | 0 | 2 | 32 | 8 | 129 | −121 | 1 | Relegation to Eccellenza |

Updated to match(es) played on May 1995. Source: CalcioDiEccellenza.it
(D) Disqualified; (E) Eliminated; (P) Promoted; (R) Relegated

=== Girone C ===
| Pos | Team | Pld | W | D | L | GF | GA | GD | Pts | |
|---|---|---|---|---|---|---|---|---|---|---|
| 1 | Alzano Virescit (P, O) | 34 | 19 | 12 | 3 | 54 | 25 | +29 | 50 | Promotion to Serie C2 |
| 2 | Imolese | 34 | 20 | 10 | 4 | 54 | 22 | +32 | 50 | Qualification to promotion play-offs |
| 3 | Collecchio | 34 | 15 | 13 | 6 | 43 | 28 | +15 | 43 | |
| 4 | Faenza | 34 | 15 | 11 | 8 | 52 | 36 | +16 | 41 | |
| 5 | Fidenza | 34 | 12 | 17 | 5 | 31 | 23 | +8 | 41 | |
| 6 | Castel San Pietro | 34 | 11 | 13 | 10 | 31 | 27 | +4 | 35 | |
| 7 | Sassuolo | 34 | 9 | 16 | 9 | 32 | 29 | +3 | 34 | |
| 8 | Bagnolese | 34 | 7 | 20 | 7 | 23 | 23 | 0 | 34 | |
| 9 | San Paolo d'Argon | 34 | 9 | 15 | 10 | 35 | 29 | +6 | 33 | |
| 10 | Darfo Boario | 34 | 8 | 17 | 9 | 34 | 40 | −6 | 33 | |
| 11 | Albinese | 34 | 8 | 16 | 10 | 30 | 36 | −6 | 32 | |
| 12 | Capriolo | 34 | 8 | 16 | 10 | 31 | 39 | −8 | 32 | |
| 13 | Reggiolo | 34 | 7 | 17 | 10 | 30 | 32 | −2 | 31 | |
| 14 | Club Azzurri Brescia (O) | 34 | 10 | 10 | 14 | 39 | 49 | −10 | 30 | Qualification to relegation play-offs |
| 15 | Argentana (R) | 34 | 7 | 16 | 11 | 25 | 34 | −9 | 30 | Qualification to relegation play-offs |
| 16 | Casalese (R) | 34 | 6 | 14 | 14 | 33 | 47 | −14 | 26 | Relegation to Eccellenza |
| 17 | Chiari (R) | 34 | 6 | 9 | 19 | 27 | 54 | −27 | 21 | Relegation to Eccellenza |
| 18 | Sassolese S. Giorgio (R) | 34 | 2 | 12 | 20 | 17 | 48 | −31 | 16 | Relegation to Eccellenza |

Updated to match(es) played on May 1995. Source: CalcioDiEccellenza.it
(O) Play-off winners; (P) Promoted; (R) Relegated

==== Promotion play-off ====
Played on 21 May 1995 in Mantua.

| Team 1 | Score | Team 2 |
|---|---|---|
| Alzano Virescit | 2–0 | Imolese |

==== Relegation play-off ====
Played on 20 May 1995 in Legnago.

| Team 1 | Score | Team 2 |
|---|---|---|
| Club Azzurri Brescia | 2–0 | Argentana |

=== Girone D ===
| Pos | Team | Pld | W | D | L | GF | GA | GD | Pts | |
|---|---|---|---|---|---|---|---|---|---|---|
| 1 | Treviso (P) | 34 | 24 | 6 | 4 | 62 | 20 | +42 | 54 | Promotion to Serie C2 |
| 2 | Triestina | 34 | 22 | 9 | 3 | 54 | 17 | +37 | 53 | |
| 3 | Legnago Salus | 34 | 16 | 11 | 7 | 47 | 27 | +20 | 43 | |
| 4 | Bolzano | 34 | 13 | 16 | 5 | 50 | 31 | +19 | 42 | |
| 5 | Miranese | 34 | 13 | 14 | 7 | 26 | 23 | +3 | 40 | |
| 6 | Caerano | 34 | 13 | 11 | 10 | 46 | 42 | +4 | 37 | |
| 7 | Arzignano | 34 | 11 | 14 | 9 | 23 | 25 | −2 | 36 | |
| 8 | Pro Gorizia | 34 | 6 | 19 | 9 | 24 | 27 | −3 | 31 | |
| 9 | Sanvitese | 34 | 8 | 15 | 11 | 29 | 33 | −4 | 31 | |
| 10 | Luparense | 34 | 11 | 9 | 14 | 29 | 34 | −5 | 31 | |
| 11 | Bassano Virtus | 34 | 8 | 15 | 11 | 22 | 27 | −5 | 31 | |
| 12 | Sevegliano | 34 | 5 | 20 | 9 | 22 | 28 | −6 | 30 | |
| 13 | Pievigina | 34 | 7 | 15 | 12 | 25 | 32 | −7 | 29 | |
| 14 | Donada (O) | 34 | 9 | 11 | 14 | 23 | 29 | −6 | 29 | Qualification to relegation play-offs |
| 15 | Montebelluna (R) | 34 | 9 | 11 | 14 | 30 | 43 | −13 | 29 | Qualification to relegation play-offs |
| 16 | Arco (R) | 34 | 6 | 16 | 12 | 24 | 40 | −16 | 28 | Relegation to Eccellenza |
| 17 | Schio (R) | 34 | 5 | 11 | 18 | 23 | 49 | −26 | 21 | Relegation to Eccellenza |
| 18 | Rovereto (R) | 34 | 3 | 11 | 20 | 17 | 49 | −32 | 17 | Relegation to Eccellenza |

Updated to match(es) played on May 1995. Source: CalcioDiEccellenza.it
(O) Play-off winners; (P) Promoted; (R) Relegated

==== Relegation play-off ====
Played on 20 May 1995 in Mirano.

| Team 1 | Score | Team 2 |
|---|---|---|
| Donada | 0–0 (4–2 p) | Montebelluna |

=== Girone E ===
| Pos | Team | Pld | W | D | L | GF | GA | GD | Pts | |
|---|---|---|---|---|---|---|---|---|---|---|
| 1 | Viterbese (P) | 34 | 17 | 13 | 4 | 41 | 17 | +24 | 47 | Promotion to Serie C2 |
| 2 | Ternana | 34 | 16 | 13 | 5 | 41 | 22 | +19 | 45 | |
| 3 | Pontevecchio | 34 | 13 | 16 | 5 | 36 | 25 | +11 | 42 | |
| 4 | Riccione | 34 | 15 | 10 | 9 | 39 | 27 | +12 | 40 | |
| 5 | Impruneta Tavarnuzze | 34 | 14 | 10 | 10 | 30 | 18 | +12 | 38 | |
| 6 | Città di Castello | 34 | 13 | 11 | 10 | 27 | 22 | +5 | 37 | |
| 7 | San Marino | 34 | 10 | 16 | 8 | 36 | 31 | +5 | 36 | |
| 8 | Pontassieve | 34 | 14 | 8 | 12 | 32 | 33 | −1 | 36 | |
| 9 | Narnese | 34 | 11 | 13 | 10 | 35 | 32 | +3 | 35 | |
| 10 | Sangiovannese | 34 | 11 | 13 | 10 | 25 | 27 | −2 | 35 | |
| 11 | Gubbio | 34 | 10 | 14 | 10 | 35 | 32 | +3 | 34 | |
| 12 | Arezzo | 34 | 10 | 14 | 10 | 27 | 31 | −4 | 34 | |
| 13 | Rondinella | 34 | 6 | 19 | 9 | 30 | 35 | −5 | 31 | |
| 14 | Sestese | 34 | 7 | 17 | 10 | 20 | 27 | −7 | 31 | |
| 15 | Sansepolcro (R) | 34 | 8 | 13 | 13 | 28 | 36 | −8 | 29 | Relegation to Eccellenza |
| 16 | Orvietana (R) | 34 | 9 | 9 | 16 | 27 | 32 | −5 | 27 | Relegation to Eccellenza |
| 17 | Rieti (R) | 34 | 6 | 14 | 14 | 25 | 37 | −12 | 26 | Relegation to Eccellenza |
| 18 | Bastia (R) | 34 | 2 | 5 | 27 | 11 | 61 | −50 | 9 | Relegation to Eccellenza |

Updated to match(es) played on May 1995. Source: CalcioDiEccellenza.it
(P) Promoted; (R) Relegated

=== Girone F ===
| Pos | Team | Pld | W | D | L | GF | GA | GD | Pts | |
|---|---|---|---|---|---|---|---|---|---|---|
| 1 | Tolentino (P) | 34 | 19 | 9 | 6 | 49 | 21 | +28 | 47 | Promotion to Serie C2 |
| 2 | Nereto | 34 | 15 | 15 | 4 | 50 | 25 | +25 | 45 | |
| 3 | Termoli | 34 | 14 | 14 | 6 | 35 | 22 | +13 | 42 | |
| 4 | Civitanovese | 34 | 14 | 12 | 8 | 35 | 28 | +7 | 40 | |
| 5 | Paganica | 34 | 13 | 13 | 8 | 42 | 35 | +7 | 39 | |
| 6 | Jesi | 34 | 11 | 14 | 9 | 33 | 24 | +9 | 36 | |
| 7 | Santegidiese | 34 | 11 | 13 | 10 | 36 | 33 | +3 | 35 | |
| 8 | Recanatese | 34 | 9 | 16 | 9 | 32 | 31 | +1 | 34 | |
| 9 | Camerino | 34 | 10 | 14 | 10 | 29 | 28 | +1 | 34 | |
| 10 | Vigor Senigallia | 34 | 10 | 14 | 10 | 35 | 37 | −2 | 34 | |
| 11 | Francavilla | 34 | 8 | 16 | 10 | 30 | 34 | −4 | 32 | |
| 12 | Mosciano | 34 | 9 | 14 | 11 | 31 | 36 | −5 | 32 | |
| 13 | Luco dei Marsi | 34 | 8 | 15 | 11 | 34 | 42 | −8 | 31 | |
| 14 | Osimana (O) | 34 | 8 | 15 | 11 | 28 | 34 | −6 | 31 | Qualification to relegation play-offs |
| 15 | Penne (R) | 34 | 11 | 9 | 14 | 24 | 30 | −6 | 31 | Qualification to relegation play-offs |
| 16 | Campobasso (R) | 34 | 10 | 10 | 14 | 24 | 29 | −5 | 30 | Relegation to Eccellenza |
| 17 | Roccaravindola (R) | 34 | 6 | 9 | 19 | 31 | 63 | −32 | 21 | Relegation to Eccellenza |
| 18 | Sulmona (R) | 34 | 3 | 12 | 19 | 22 | 48 | −26 | 18 | Relegation to Eccellenza |

Updated to match(es) played on May 1995. Source: CalcioDiEccellenza.it
(O) Play-off winners; (P) Promoted; (R) Relegated

==== Relegation play-off ====
Played on 20 May 1995 in Teramo.

| Team 1 | Score | Team 2 |
|---|---|---|
| Osimana | 1–0 (a.e.t.) | Penne |

=== Girone G ===
| Pos | Team | Pld | W | D | L | GF | GA | GD | Pts | Promotion, qualification or relegation |
|---|---|---|---|---|---|---|---|---|---|---|
| 1 | Marsala (P) | 34 | 19 | 12 | 3 | 42 | 11 | +31 | 50 | Promotion to Serie C |
| 2 | Civitavecchia | 34 | 18 | 13 | 3 | 44 | 12 | +32 | 49 | |
| 3 | Monterotondo | 34 | 18 | 9 | 7 | 51 | 25 | +26 | 45 | |
| 4 | Città di Anagni | 34 | 10 | 14 | 10 | 47 | 37 | +10 | 34 | |
| 5 | Civita Castellana | 34 | 13 | 8 | 13 | 36 | 42 | −6 | 34 | |
| 6 | Folgore Castelvetrano | 34 | 11 | 12 | 11 | 34 | 42 | −8 | 34 | |
| 7 | Alcamo | 34 | 10 | 13 | 11 | 37 | 35 | +2 | 33 | |
| 8 | Ladispoli | 34 | 8 | 17 | 9 | 33 | 32 | +1 | 33 | |
| 9 | Sciacca | 34 | 10 | 13 | 11 | 36 | 36 | 0 | 33 | |
| 10 | Ferentino | 34 | 11 | 11 | 12 | 35 | 35 | 0 | 33 | |
| 11 | Latina | 34 | 10 | 13 | 11 | 26 | 32 | −6 | 33 | |
| 12 | Ceccano | 34 | 10 | 12 | 12 | 41 | 27 | +14 | 32 | |
| 13 | Isola Liri | 34 | 11 | 10 | 13 | 42 | 48 | −6 | 32 | |
| 14 | Bagheria | 34 | 9 | 14 | 11 | 23 | 43 | −20 | 32 | |
| 15 | Fiumicino (R) | 34 | 10 | 11 | 13 | 23 | 32 | −9 | 31 | Relegation to Promozione |
| 16 | Battipagliese (R) | 34 | 6 | 17 | 11 | 34 | 35 | −1 | 29 | Relegation to Promozione |
| 17 | Mazara (R) | 34 | 8 | 8 | 18 | 18 | 40 | −22 | 24 | Relegation to Promozione |
| 18 | Partinicaudace (R) | 34 | 6 | 9 | 19 | 31 | 69 | −38 | 21 | Relegation to Promozione |

Updated to match(es) played on May 1995. Source: CalcioDiEccellenza.it
(P) Promoted; (R) Relegated

=== Girone H ===
| Pos | Team | Pld | W | D | L | GF | GA | GD | Pts | Promotion, qualification or relegation |
|---|---|---|---|---|---|---|---|---|---|---|
| 1 | Taranto (C, P) | 34 | 22 | 5 | 7 | 61 | 29 | +32 | 49 | Promotion to Serie C |
| 2 | Cerignola | 34 | 18 | 10 | 6 | 59 | 24 | +35 | 46 | |
| 3 | Nardò | 34 | 16 | 12 | 6 | 40 | 16 | +24 | 44 | |
| 4 | Toma Maglie | 34 | 16 | 9 | 9 | 43 | 25 | +18 | 41 | |
| 5 | Cavese | 34 | 14 | 13 | 7 | 36 | 24 | +12 | 41 | |
| 6 | Casertana | 34 | 13 | 9 | 12 | 44 | 35 | +9 | 35 | |
| 7 | Boys Caivanese | 34 | 7 | 20 | 7 | 30 | 29 | +1 | 34 | |
| 8 | San Severo | 34 | 8 | 18 | 8 | 25 | 29 | −4 | 34 | |
| 9 | Gabbiano Napoli | 34 | 11 | 10 | 13 | 25 | 27 | −2 | 32 | |
| 10 | Scafatese | 34 | 10 | 12 | 12 | 31 | 34 | −3 | 32 | |
| 11 | Canosa | 34 | 11 | 9 | 14 | 30 | 40 | −10 | 31 | |
| 12 | Pro Italia Galatina | 34 | 9 | 13 | 12 | 25 | 36 | −11 | 31 | |
| 13 | Altamura | 34 | 9 | 13 | 12 | 29 | 43 | −14 | 31 | |
| 14 | Comprensorio Puteolano | 34 | 9 | 13 | 12 | 29 | 43 | −14 | 31 | |
| 15 | Portici (R) | 34 | 8 | 12 | 14 | 19 | 37 | −18 | 28 | Relegation to Promozione |
| 16 | Pro Salerno (R) | 34 | 6 | 15 | 13 | 17 | 26 | −9 | 27 | Relegation to Promozione |
| 17 | Martina (R) | 34 | 8 | 9 | 17 | 27 | 41 | −14 | 25 | Relegation to Promozione |
| 18 | Acerrana (R) | 34 | 5 | 10 | 19 | 32 | 64 | −32 | 20 | Relegation to Promozione |

Updated to match(es) played on May 1995. Source: CalcioDiEccellenza.it
(C) Champions; (P) Promoted; (R) Relegated

=== Girone I ===
| Pos | Team | Pld | W | D | L | GF | GA | GD | Pts | Promotion, qualification or relegation |
|---|---|---|---|---|---|---|---|---|---|---|
| 1 | Catania (P) | 34 | 21 | 11 | 2 | 50 | 15 | +35 | 53 | Promotion to Serie C |
| 2 | Milazzo | 34 | 20 | 11 | 3 | 56 | 16 | +40 | 51 | |
| 3 | Messina | 34 | 16 | 12 | 6 | 53 | 26 | +27 | 44 | |
| 4 | Rossanese | 34 | 12 | 18 | 4 | 45 | 28 | +17 | 42 | |
| 5 | Invicta Potenza | 34 | 14 | 13 | 7 | 38 | 25 | +13 | 41 | |
| 6 | Juveterranova Gela | 34 | 14 | 13 | 7 | 33 | 21 | +12 | 41 | |
| 7 | Ragusa | 34 | 12 | 12 | 10 | 25 | 20 | +5 | 36 | |
| 8 | Rotonda | 34 | 9 | 15 | 10 | 37 | 35 | +2 | 33 | |
| 9 | Real Catanzaro | 34 | 10 | 13 | 11 | 29 | 27 | +2 | 33 | |
| 10 | Agropoli | 34 | 11 | 10 | 13 | 35 | 37 | −2 | 32 | |
| 11 | Gravina | 34 | 7 | 17 | 10 | 32 | 34 | −2 | 31 | |
| 12 | Igea Virtus | 34 | 11 | 8 | 15 | 33 | 35 | −2 | 30 | |
| 13 | Gioiese | 34 | 8 | 13 | 13 | 32 | 47 | −15 | 29 | |
| 14 | Canicattì | 34 | 7 | 13 | 14 | 24 | 47 | −23 | 27 | |
| 15 | La Sportiva Cariatese (R) | 34 | 6 | 14 | 14 | 23 | 47 | −24 | 26 | Relegation to Promozione |
| 16 | Gangi (R) | 34 | 5 | 15 | 14 | 23 | 44 | −21 | 25 | Relegation to Promozione |
| 17 | Comiso (R) | 34 | 6 | 8 | 20 | 27 | 62 | −35 | 20 | Relegation to Promozione |
| 18 | Leonzio (R) | 34 | 6 | 6 | 22 | 31 | 60 | −29 | 18 | Relegation to Promozione |

Updated to match(es) played on May 1995. Source: CalcioDiEccellenza.it
(P) Promoted; (R) Relegated

== Scudetto playoffs ==
=== Preliminary rounds ===
==== Group A ====
| Pos | Team | Pld | W | D | L | GF | GA | GD | Pts |
|---|---|---|---|---|---|---|---|---|---|
| 1 | Gallaratese | 2 | 2 | 0 | 0 | 3 | 1 | +2 | 4 |
| 2 | Grosseto | 2 | 1 | 0 | 1 | 3 | 3 | 0 | 2 |
| 3 | Alzano Virescit | 2 | 0 | 0 | 2 | 3 | 5 | −2 | 0 |

Source: CalcioDiEccellenza.it

| Gallaratese | 2–1 | Alzano Virescit |
| Alzano Virescit | 2–3 | Grosseto |
| Grosseto | 0–1 | Gallaratese |

==== Group B ====
| Pos | Team | Pld | W | D | L | GF | GA | GD | Pts |
|---|---|---|---|---|---|---|---|---|---|
| 1 | Viterbese | 2 | 1 | 1 | 0 | 2 | 1 | +1 | 3 |
| 2 | Treviso | 2 | 0 | 1 | 1 | 1 | 2 | −1 | 1 |

Source: CalcioDiEccellenza.it

| Viterbese | 1–0 | Treviso |
| Treviso | 1–1 | Viterbese |

==== Group C ====
| Pos | Team | Pld | W | D | L | GF | GA | GD | Pts |
|---|---|---|---|---|---|---|---|---|---|
| 1 | Tolentino | 2 | 2 | 0 | 0 | 2 | 0 | +2 | 4 |
| 2 | Marsala | 2 | 0 | 0 | 2 | 0 | 2 | −2 | 0 |

Source: CalcioDiEccellenza.it

| Marsala | 0–1 | Tolentino |
| Tolentino | 1–0 | Marsala |

==== Group D ====
| Pos | Team | Pld | W | D | L | GF | GA | GD | Pts |
|---|---|---|---|---|---|---|---|---|---|
| 1 | Taranto | 2 | 1 | 0 | 1 | 4 | 3 | +1 | 2 |
| 2 | Catania | 2 | 1 | 0 | 1 | 3 | 4 | −1 | 2 |

Source: CalcioDiEccellenza.it

| Catania | 3–2 | Taranto |
| Taranto | 2–0 | Catania |

=== Final rounds ===
==== Semi-finals ====
First leg played on 8 June 1995 in Taranto; second leg played on 18 June 1995 in Viterbo

| Team 1 | Agg. | Team 2 | 1st leg | 2nd leg |
|---|---|---|---|---|
| Taranto | 7–2 | Viterbese | 5–1 | 2–1 |

First leg played on 11 June 1995 in Tolentino; second leg played on 18 June 1995 in Gallarate

| Team 1 | Agg. | Team 2 | 1st leg | 2nd leg |
|---|---|---|---|---|
| Tolentino | 4–4 (a) | Gallaratese | 2–1 | 2–3 |

==== Finals ====
First leg played on 22 June 1995 in Taranto; second leg played on 25 June 1995 in Tolentino

| Team 1 | Agg. | Team 2 | 1st leg | 2nd leg |
|---|---|---|---|---|
| Taranto | 9–1 | Tolentino | 5–0 | 4–1 |
