= Giovanni Cornacchini =

Italian footballer and coach (born 1965)

Personal information
- Date of birth: 22 July 1965 (age 61)
- Place of birth: Fano, Italy
- Height: 1.68 m (5 ft 6 in)
- Position: Striker

Senior career*
Years	Team	Apps	(Gls)
1981–1987	Fano	112	(25)
1985–1986	→ Foligno (loan)	25	(5)
1987–1988	Reggiana	29	(5)
1988–1989	Virescit	30	(11)
1989–1991	Piacenza	63	(38)
1991–1992	Milan	3	(0)
1992–1995	Perugia	107	(60)
1995–1996	Bologna	23	(4)
1996–1997	Vicenza	18	(1)
1997	Castel di Sangro	7	(0)
1997–1998	Padova	7	(0)
1998	Ternana	10	(3)
1998–2000	Gubbio	46	(13)
2000–2001	Fano	25	(7)
2001–2003	Cagliese	61	(20)
Total		566	(192)

Managerial career
- 2003–2004: Cagliese
- 2004–2005: Canavese
- 2005–2006: Sansepolcro
- 2007–2009: Group Città di Castello
- 2009–2010: Fano
- 2010–2011: Fermana
- 2011–2013: Civitanovese
- 2013–2016: Ancona
- 2016: Viterbese
- 2017: Viterbese
- 2017: Gubbio
- 2018–2019: Bari
- 2020–2021: Fermana
- 2021: Forlì
- 2023: Vastese
- 2023–2024: Fano
- * Club domestic league appearances and goals

Giovanni Cornacchini (born 22 July 1965) is an Italian professional football coach and former football player who played as a forward.

== Playing career ==
Cornacchini initially played for Fano between 1981 and 1987, and also had a spell on loan with Foligno during the 1985–86 season. After stints with Reggiana and Virescit Bergamo, he joined Piacenza in 1989, where he scored 36 goals in two seasons, finishing as the top scorer in Serie C1 on both occasions, and helping his team to win promotion during the 1990–91 season. His performances and prolific goalscoring attracted the attention of Serie A club Milan, by whom he was subsequently acquired in 1991; however, he often struggled to find space in the team's starting XI under manager Fabio Capello, due to the presence of established forwards such as Marco van Basten and Ruud Gullit; he obtained only three league appearances, making his club and Serie A debut on 15 September 1991, in a 1–1 away draw against Juventus in Turin, as Milan finished the 1991–92 season as Serie A champions.

The following season, Cornacchini returned to Serie C1, joining Perugia, where he scored 59 goals over three seasons, finishing as the top scorer of his division in the first two, and later helping his team achieve promotion to Serie B as the league's second-highest goalscorer, behind only Giovanni Pisano. He joined Bologna ahead of the 1995–96 season, although he was unable to replicate his performances at Perugia. Notwithstanding this, the following season, he was acquired by Vicenza manager Francesco Guidolin (whom he later described as his best manager in 2019), where he won the 1996–97 Coppa Italia, contributing to his team's victory by scoring important goals in the competition, in particular against Genoa, and later against his former club Bologna in the semi-finals; he also started in the victorious two-legged final against Napoli. He made 18 Serie A appearances that season, and scored his only Serie A goal on 20 April 1997, in a 4–1 win over Perugia in Reggio Emilia. In total, he obtained 21 appearances in his two seasons in the Italian top flight.

In 1997, Cornacchini joined Serie B side Padova, but subsequently moved to fellow second division side Castel di Sangro in November of that year. In February, after only making seven appearances for the latter club, he joined Ternana in Serie C1, helping the club obtain promotion with three goals in 13 appearances under manager Luigi Delneri. After returning to Padova, now in Serie C1, he ended his career in the lower divisions of Italian football, with Gubbio, Fano, and finally Cagliese, retiring at the end of the 2002–03 season.

== Style of play ==
A fast, agile, and diminutive forward, Cornacchini was known for his speed in tight spaces, his opportunism inside the penalty area, and his eye for goal; however, he was not particularly skilful from a technical standpoint. Despite his slender build and small stature of 1.69 m (5 ft 6 1/2 in), he was also effective in the air, courtesy of his power and elevation. Known for his clinical finishing in front of goal, he was a highly prolific goalscorer in Serie C; however, he struggled to replicate similar goalscoring performances in Serie A.

== Coaching career ==
Following his retirement, Cornacchini worked as a manager. On 22 September 2019, he was fired by Bari.

On 6 December 2020, he was hired by Serie C club Fermana. He left the club by the end of the season after guiding them to safety.

On 12 July 2021, he joined Forlì in Serie D. He was fired on 25 October 2021 as Forlì only gained 8 points in the first 8 league games.

== Honours ==
=== Player ===
Piacenza

- Serie C1/Girone A: 1990–91 (Promotion to Serie B)

Milan

- Serie A: 1991–92

Perugia

- Serie C1/Girone B: 1993–94 (Promotion to Serie B)

Bologna

- Serie B: 1995–96

Vicenza

- Coppa Italia: 1996–97

Individual

- Serie C1 Top-scorer (5): 1986–87 (13 goals), 1989–90 (16 goals), 1990–91 (22 goals), 1992–93 (19 goals), 1993–94 (20 goals)
