= Albiano (disambiguation) =

Albiano may refer to a number of small towns or villages in Italy:

in Piedmont

- Albiano d'Ivrea, a town and commune in the Province of Turin

in Trentino-Alto Adige/Südtirol

- Albiano (TN) a town and commune in the Province of Trento

in Tuscany

- Albiano (Anghiari), near Anghiari, Province of Arezzo
- Albiano (AR), between Arezzo and Monterchi, Province of Arezzo
- Albiano (Minucciano), near Minucciano, Province of Lucca
- Albiano (Barga), near Barga, Province of Lucca
- Santa Maria Albiano, near Camaiore, Province of Lucca
- Albiano di Magra, a former commune of Lunigiana, suppressed in 1870; its territory today is divided between the communes of Aulla and Podenzana, Province of Massa-Carrara
- Albiano (Montemurlo), a frazione of Montemurlo, Province of Prato

Albiano may also refer to an Italian football club:

- A.S.D. Porfido Albiano, located in Albiano (TN)
