= Bonura =

Bonura is a surname. Notable people with the surname include:

- Marco Bonura (born 1979), Italian footballer
- Zeke Bonura (1908–1987), American baseball player
