= Luca Gentili (footballer, born 1986) =

Italian footballer

Personal information
- Date of birth: 22 May 1986 (age 40)
- Place of birth: Fano, Italy
- Positions: Right back; midfielder

Team information
- Current team: Fossombrone

Youth career
- Vis Pesaro
- 2003–2004: → Perugia (loan)
- 2004–2005: → Internazionale (loan)

Senior career*
Years	Team	Apps	(Gls)
2002–2003	Vis Pesaro	9	(0)
2005–2007	Fano	59	(4)
2007–2008	Ancona	0	(0)
2008–2009	Valle del Giovenco	13	(1)
2009–2010	Real Montecchio	28	(0)
2010–	Fossombrone		
- * Club domestic league appearances and goals

Luca Gentili (born 22 May 1986) is an Italian footballer who plays for Serie D club Fossombrone.

== Biography ==
Born in Fano, the second largest town (by population) in the Province of Pesaro and Urbino, Gentili started his career with Vis Pesaro. After a season with Perugia, he was loaned to Inter Milan. He played once for the Inter first team in a friendly match. However, Inter did not buy him, and Gentili returned to Fano and played two Serie D seasons.

In August 2007, he signed a 1-year contract with, but now as a right back. He only managed to play for Ancona in the 2007–08 Coppa Italia Serie C.

In January 2008, he was signed by Valle del Giovenco. After the club was promoted to Lega Pro Prima Divisione, he was released.

In the 2009–10 season, he played for Serie D side Real Montecchio, and in the next season, he left for Fossombrone after Montecchio was relegated. Both clubs were located in the Province of Pesaro and Urbino.
