= Francesco Casolla =

Italian footballer

Personal information
- Date of birth: 4 April 1992 (age 34)
- Place of birth: Cattolica, Italy
- Height: 1.67 m (5 ft 6 in)
- Positions: Forward; winger

Team information
- Current team: Fossombrone

Youth career
- Vis Pesaro
- 2006–2009: Cesena
- 2007–2008: → Bellaria (loan)

Senior career*
Years	Team	Apps	(Gls)
2009–2011	Riccione / Real Rimini	46	(11)
2011–2013	San Marino	40	(6)
2013–2014	Teramo	31	(6)
2014–2015	San Marino	12	(2)
2015	Pro Patria	2	(0)
2015–2016	San Nicolò	17	(2)
2016	Sangiovannese	8	(1)
2016–2017	Vigasio	17	(5)
2017–2018	Dro Alto Garda	31	(12)
2018–2020	Bra	56	(34)
2020–2021	Rimini	25	(7)
2021–2022	Fano	28	(11)
2022–2023	Avezzano	9	(3)
2023	La Fiorita	0	(0)
2023–2025	Fossombrone	56	(25)
2024	→ La Fiorita (loan)	0	(0)
2025	Sammaurese	6	(3)
2025–	Fossombrone	13	(2)
- * Club domestic league appearances and goals as of 1 March 2026

Francesco Casolla (born 4 April 1992) is an Italian footballer who plays for Serie D club Fossombrone.

== Biography ==
Casolla started his career at Vis Pesaro. ca. 2006–07 season he was signed by Cesena. Casolla was loaned to Bellaria in 2007–08 season for their Allievi team (usually U16 for Lega Pro clubs) He returned to Cesena for their Allievi under-17 team in 2008–09 season. Casolla started his senior career at amateur (non fully professional) club Riccione, a minor team in the Province of Rimini in 2010–11 Serie D. In the next season the club moved to Rimini and renamed as Real Rimini, also in the fifth division. Casolla was a member of Serie D representative team that season.

On 30 August 2011 Casolla returned to Cesena but immediately left for San Marino in temporary deal with option to sign half of the registration rights. On 21 June 2012 San Marino excised the option for €5,000. During 2012–13 season San Marino acquired Casolla outright for €500.

On 6 August 2013 Casolla was signed by Teramo in another co-ownership deal. Casolla made his debut on 1 September. Casolla played his first start on 7 September. In June 2014 Teramo acquired him outright.

On 18 August 2020 he signed with Serie D club Rimini.

After being registered with Fano, from 9 September 2022 he is a player of Avezzano, a Serie D club.
