= Antonio Broso =

Italian professional football player (born 1991)

Personal information
- Date of birth: 25 February 1991 (age 35)
- Place of birth: Vibo Valentia, Italy
- Height: 1.82 m (5 ft 11 1/2 in)
- Position: Forward

Team information
- Current team: US Vigor Senigallia

Youth career
- 2007–2008: Parma
- 2009–2010: Crotone

Senior career*
Years	Team	Apps	(Gls)
2010–2012	Crotone	0	(0)
2011	→ Messina (loan)	15	(5)
2011–2012	→ Ebolitana (loan)	35	(6)
2012–2013	HinterReggio	17	(0)
2013–2014	Giulianova	21	(7)
2014	Valle d'Aosta	10	(5)
2014–2015	Chieti	20	(10)
2015–2016	Legnago Salus	34	(17)
2016	Chieri	10	(1)
2016–2018	Ravenna	41	(14)
2018–2019	Reggiana	21	(2)
2019	Clodiense	11	(1)
2019–2020	Legnago Salus	12	(0)
2020–2021	Foligno	23	(4)
2021–2023	Fano	54	(13)
2023–	Senigallia	15	(3)
- * Club domestic league appearances and goals as of 20 December 2023

Antonio Broso (born 25 February 1991) is an Italian professional football player who plays for Serie D club Senigallia.

== Club career ==
He made his Serie C debut for Ravenna on 15 October 2017 in a game against Feralpisalò.

Ahead of the 2019–20 season, Broso joined Clodiense. He left the club in December 2019, to join fellow league club Legnago Salus.
