= Marco Bonura =

Italian retired footballer and manager

Personal information
- Date of birth: 2 August 1979 (age 47)
- Place of birth: Milan, Italy
- Height: 1.81 m (5 ft 11 in)
- Position: Midfielder

Youth career
- Monza
- 1997–1998: A.C. Milan

Senior career*
Years	Team	Apps	(Gls)
1997	Monza	1	(0)
1998–2000	Milan	0	(0)
1998–1999	→ Gubbio (loan)	25	(4)
1999–2000	→ Livorno (loan)	12	(0)
2000–2003	Internazionale	0	(0)
2000–2001	→ Sangiovannese (loan)	31	(8)
2001–2002	→ Catania (loan)	15	(1)
2002	→ Sambenedettese (loan)	8	(0)
2002–2003	→ Prato (loan)	30	(2)
2003–2004	Rimini	13	(0)
2004–2005	Vis Pesaro	22	(1)
2005–2008	Foligno	50	(9)
2008–2010	Cesena	22	(1)
2012–2013	Pierantonio	8	(0)

International career
1995	Italy U15	2	(1)

Managerial career
- 2013–2014: Gubbio (youth)
- 2015: Gubbio (caretaker)
- 2016–2017: GS Lama Calcio
- 2017–2018: SSD Subasio
- 2018–2019: Bastia 1924
- 2019–2020: Sansepolcro
- 2020–2021: SC Trestina
- 2021–2023: Follonica Gavorrano
- 2023–2024: Sansepolcro
- 2024–2025: Sangiovannese
- 2026–: ASD Fabriano Cerreto
- * Club domestic league appearances and goals

Marco Bonura (born 2 August 1979) is an Italian football coach and former footballer who is currently as a head coach for ASD Fabriano Cerreto.

== Club career ==
Born in Milan, Bonura started his professional career at Monza, located in Monza, by-then part of the province of Milan. He then spent a season at A.C. Milan youth team. Since 1998, Bonura spent seasons on loan at Serie C1 and Serie C2 clubs. And he was one of the player that swapped between A.C. Milan and Internazionale in 2000s (decade) with inflated nominal value, made the clubs gained "false profit". In 2000, he swapped club with Andrea Polizzano (tagged for 8,000 million lire; €4,131,655; Milan nor Inter did not disclose the price of Bonura). The deals made Milan gained €4.013 million (but in terms of Polizzano's registration rights) and Inter "gained" 7,954,666,667 lire (= €4,108,242, in terms of Bonura's registration rights).

He was loaned to Calcio Catania along with Inter "team-mate" Davide Cordone in 2000–01 season. In July 2003, he was signed by Rimini in co-ownership deal from Internazionlae. In 2004, he left for Vis Pesaro but released after the bankrupt of the club in June 2005. In December 2005 for Foligno, where he played 3 seasons.

In July 2008, he was signed by Cesena along with team-mate Gianluca Segarelli.

He won promotion back to Serie A as Serie B runner-up in 2010.

== Managerial career ==
On 4 May 2015, Bonura was appointed caretaker manager of Gubbio for the rest of the season, following the firing of Leonardo Acori. Before this appointment, Bonura worked as assistant manager and youth coach for the club.

In the summer 2016, he was then appointed manager of Italian amateur club G.S. Lama Calcio. Ahead of the 2017–18 season, he was hired as manager for SSD Subasio.

On 26 May 2018, Bastia 1924 announced that they had appointed Bonura as their new manager. He was replaced in at the end of the season.

In September 2019, he was appointed manager of Sansepolcro.

== Honours ==
- Lega Pro Prima Divisione: 2009
