= Luca Gentili =

Luca Gentili may refer to:

- Luca Gentili (footballer, born 1972), former Italian footballer and goalkeeping coach
- Luca Gentili (footballer, born 1986), Italian footballer
