= 2008–09 in Italian football =

The 2008–09 season was the 107th season of competitive football in Italy.

== Overview ==
- Chievo made their return to Serie A after just one season in the second tier.
- Sassuolo made their debut in Serie B.

== Events ==
- June 26, 2008 – Marcello Lippi was appointed as Italy coach, replacing Roberto Donadoni.
- August 31, 2008 - Serie A season began.

== National team ==
Italy played the qualifying campaign for the 2010 FIFA World Cup. Italy also be participated in the FIFA Confederations Cup in mid-to-late June, 2009.

Date	Venue	Opponents	Score	Competition	Italy scorers
August 20, 2008	Stade du Ray, Nice (N)	Austria	2–2	F	Alberto Gilardino, Ramazan Özcan (own goal)
September 6, 2008	Neo GSP Stadium, Nicosia (A)	Cyprus	2–1	WCQ	Antonio Di Natale (2)
September 10, 2008	Stadio Friuli, Udine (H)	Georgia	2–0	WCQ	Daniele De Rossi (2)
October 11, 2008	Vasil Levski National Stadium, Sofia (A)	Bulgaria	0–0	WCQ	
October 15, 2008	Stadio Via del Mare, Lecce (H)	Montenegro	2–1	WCQ	Alberto Aquilani (2)
February 11, 2009	Emirates Stadium, London (N)	Brazil	0–2	F	
March 28, 2009	Podgorica City Stadium, Podgorica (A)	Montenegro	2–0	WCQ	Andrea Pirlo, Giampaolo Pazzini
April 1, 2009	Stadio San Nicola, Bari (H)	Republic of Ireland	1–1	WCQ	Vincenzo Iaquinta
June 6, 2009	Arena Garibaldi - Stadio Romeo Anconetani, Pisa (H)	Northern Ireland		F	

Key

- H = Home match
- A = Away match
- N = Neutral site
- WCQ = World Cup Qualifier
- F = friendly

== Honours ==
Competition	Winner
Serie A	Inter
Coppa Italia	Lazio
Serie B	Bari
Lega Pro Prima Divisione - A	Cesena
Lega Pro Prima Divisione - B	Gallipoli
Lega Pro Seconda Divisione - A	Varese
Lega Pro Seconda Divisione - B	Figline
Lega Pro Seconda Divisione - C	Cosenza
Coppa Italia Lega Pro	Sorrento
Serie D	Girone A: Biellese; Girone B: P.B. Vercelli; Girone C: Sacilese; Girone D: Crociati Noceto; Girone E: Sporting Lucchese; Girone F: Pro Vasto; Girone G: Villacidrese; Girone H: Brindisi; Girone I: Siracusa
Eccellenza Regionale	See winners
Italian Super Cup	Inter

== Transfer deals ==
- List of Italian football transfers Summer 2008

== Deaths ==
- July 15, 2008 — Gionata Mingozzi, 23, Treviso midfielder, killed in a car crash.
- August 2, 2008 — Gianni De Rosa, 51, former Napoli and Palermo striker, and Serie B 1980–81 topscorer, killed in a car crash.
- August 3, 2008 — Toni Allemann, 72, former Serie A striker with Mantova between 1961 and 1963, killed by a heart attack.
- August 17, 2008 — Franco Sensi, 82, Roma chairman and owner.
- August 25, 2008 — Mario Tortul, 77, former attacking wing with 252 appearances and 69 goals in the Italian Serie A in the 1950s, uncle of Fabio Capello.
- September 27, 2008 — Dino Mio, 85, chairman and owner of Lega Pro Prima Divisione club Portosummaga.
- November 8, 2008 — Régis Genaux, 35, Belgian former footballer, Udinese player between 1997 and 2003, killed by a heart attack caused by pulmonary embolism.
- February 22, 2009 — Candido Cannavò, 78, popular Italian sports and football journalist, editor-in-chief of La Gazzetta dello Sport between 1983 and 2002.
- March 20, 2009 — Pietro Arvedi D'Emilei, 79, president of Hellas Verona until January 2009, died of injuries sustained in a car crash in his way back from a league game on December 21, 2008.
- April 20, 2009 — Franco Rotella, 42, former Serie A player with Genoa between 1983 and 1991, killed by leukemia.
