= Cornacchini =

Cornacchini is an Italian surname. Notable people with the surname include:

- Agostino Cornacchini (1686–1754), Italian sculptor and painter
- Giovanni Cornacchini (born 1965), Italian footballer and manager
