= Giovanni Mei =

Italian footballer (born 1953)

Personal information
- Date of birth: 15 October 1953 (age 73)
- Place of birth: Fano, Italy
- Height: 1.88 m (6 ft 2 in)
- Position: Defender

Team information
- Current team: Fano (technical director)

Youth career
- Fano

Senior career*
Years	Team	Apps	(Gls)
1970–1972	Fano	33	(0)
1972–1974	Bologna	5	(0)
1974–1975	Brindsi	26	(0)
1975–1976	Modena	37	(1)
1976–1980	Atalanta	120	(0)
1980–1984	Cesena	116	(0)
1984–1985	Cremonese	4	(0)
Total		341	(1)

Managerial career
- 1990–1991: Vis Pesaro
- 1991–1992: Suzzara
- 1992–1993: Barletta
- 1993–1994: Leffe
- 1995–1996: Baracca Lugo
- 1996–1998: Catania
- 2001–2002: Sambenedettese
- 2002–2003: Saipa
- 2007–2010: Bologna (assistant)
- 2011–2012: Parma (assistant)
- 2012–2013: Padova (assistant)
- 2014: Pune City (assistant)
- 2019–: Fano (technical director)
- * Club domestic league appearances and goals

Giovanni Mei (born 15 October 1953) is an Italian former football player and who now works as the technical director of Italian club Fano.

== Playing career ==
Mei played as a central defender, often used as a full-back, spending his youth career with Fano, for which he made his debut in the first team in Serie D at 18 years old. He signed for Bologna, where he made his Serie A debut. However he struggles to find space, then he played first in Brindsi and then in Modena.

In 1976 he moved to Atalanta, with which he obtained the promotion in Serie A at the first attempt (1976–77 season) and contested four championships, two in Serie A and two in Serie B. Identical curriculum he obtained with Cesena, to which he was sold in the summer 1980. In 1984 he finally moved to the newly promoted Cremonese in Serie A, with which he obtained the last four appearances in the top flight.

During his career he scored 1 goal and total of 109 appearances in Serie A and 197 appearances and in Serie B.

== Managerial career ==
Mei began his coaching career at Vis Pesaro in 1990 and later Suzzara in 1991. Category rooms where in the seasons 1992–93 and 1993–94 he trained Barletta. In 1995–96 he directed the Baracca Lugo. In 1996–97 he took over from Angelo Busetta on the Catania bench, from which he was removed during the 1997–98 season.

In 2000–01 he was on the bench of the Sambenedettese promoted in Serie C2. The following year he was soon replaced by Paolo Beruatto. In 2003 he accepted the offer of Iranian club Saipa which played in Persian Gulf Pro League. In 2006–07 he returned to Bologna as an observer. He later became assistant coach of Bologna and Parma joining Franco Colomba's technical staff.

On 17 December 2012, he became the assistant coach of Padova alongside Franco Colomba. On 20 March 2013, following Franco Colomba's release from office, he was released from office. On 22 July 2014, he became assistant coach of the Indian Super League club Pune City. After the season club cannot make playoffs and Colomba left the club with his coaching staff.

After long time absence in football management he return to his former club Fano as a technical direction in July 2019.
