= Luca Paudice =

Italian footballer

Personal information
- Date of birth: 30 October 2001 (age 25)
- Place of birth: Naples, Italy
- Height: 1.82 m (6 ft 0 in)
- Position: Forward

Team information
- Current team: Ebolitana
- Number: 45

Youth career
- Avellino
- Potenza

Senior career*
| Years | Team | Apps | (Gls) |
| 2018–2020 | Potenza | 1 | (0) |
| 2019–2020 | → Savoia (loan) | 7 | (0) |
| 2020 | → Ciliverghe (loan) | 3 | (0) |
| 2020–2021 | Real Giulianova | 30 | (12) |
| 2021–2023 | Mantova | 52 | (5) |
| 2023 | → Recanatese (loan) | 4 | (0) |
| 2023–2024 | Pontedera | 11 | (0) |
| 2024 | → Renate (loan) | 18 | (4) |
| 2024–2025 | Luparense | 29 | (4) |
| 2025–2026 | Notaresco | 24 | (8) |
| 2026– | Ebolitana | 0 | (0) |
- * Club domestic league appearances and goals as of 19 November 2026

Luca Paudice (born 30 October 2001) is an Italian footballer who plays as a forward for Italian Serie D club Ebolitana.

== Club career ==
Formed on Avellino and Potenza youth, Paudice made his senior debut on Serie C club Savoia.

On 4 February 2020, he was loaned to Ciliverghe Calcio.

On 28 June 2021, Paudice was transferred to Mantova.

On 16 January 2023, Paudice extended his contract with Mantova until 2025 and joined Recanatese on loan for the rest of the 2022–23 season.

On 19 August 2023, Paudice moved to Pontedera.
