= Davide Cordone =

Italian footballer (born 1971)

Personal information
- Full name: Davide Cordone
- Date of birth: 17 August 1971 (age 55)
- Place of birth: Varese, Italy
- Height: 1.90 m (6 ft 3 in)
- Position: Midfielder

Senior career*
Years	Team	Apps	(Gls)
1990–1992	Pro Patria	48	(6)
1992–1993	Casale	33	(1)
1993–1998	Livorno	150	(28)
1998–1999	A.C. Milan	0	(0)
1998–1999	→ Monza (loan)	34	(4)
1999–2003	Internazionale	0	(0)
1999–2000	→ Ternana (loan)	34	(2)
2000–2003	→ Catania (loan)	90	(6)
2003–2004	Genoa	37	(4)
2004–2006	Ivrea	21	(0)
2006	Catanzaro	3	(0)
Total		450	(51)
- * Club domestic league appearances and goals

Davide Cordone (born 17 August 1971) is a former Italian footballer.

== Biography ==
Cordone started his career at Pro Patria, at that time at Serie D. He played a season for Casale, then left for Livorno where he played 5 seasons. He won promotion playoffs to Serie C1 in 1997. In 1998, he joined A.C. Milan but loaned to Serie B side Monza. He was one of the player that swapped between Inter & Milan with inflated nominal transfer fees, made the club gained "false profit" in 2000s.

In 1999, he swapped with Fabio Di Sauro, making a capital gains of reported €4.7 million, but in terms of Di Sauro's registration rights. He was loaned to Serie B side Ternana then Catania. He remained for Catania for 3 seasons, which he won promotion to Serie B in 2002, along with Marco Bonura, another player bought by Inter with inflated nominal value.

In summer 2003, he joined Serie B side Genoa. He then played 1 1/2 seasons for Serie C2 side Ivrea, and last played for Serie B struggler Catanzaro which he joined in January 2006.
