= Bachir Mané =

Senegalese footballer

Personal information
- Full name: Bachir Mouhamed Mané
- Date of birth: 20 December 1997 (age 28)
- Place of birth: Dakar, Senegal
- Height: 1.84 m (6 ft 0 in)
- Position: Midfielder

Team information
- Current team: Angri
- Number: 15

Youth career
- –2015: Livorno

Senior career*
| Years | Team | Apps | (Gls) |
| 2015–2016 | Pietrasanta | 26 | (7) |
| 2016–2018 | Fermana | 42 | (2) |
| 2018 | → Carpi (loan) | 0 | (0) |
| 2018–2020 | Carpi | 0 | (0) |
| 2018–2019 | → Gozzano (loan) | 18 | (0) |
| 2019–2020 | → Fermana (loan) | 13 | (0) |
| 2021–2022 | Fano | 29 | (1) |
| 2022–2023 | Luparense | 15 | (1) |
| 2023– | Angri | 10 | (0) |
- * Club domestic league appearances and goals as of 20 December 2023

Bachir Mouhamed Mané (born 20 December 1997) is a Senegalese football player who plays for Italian Serie D club Angri.

== Club career ==
He made his Serie C debut for Fermana on 27 August 2017 in a game against Ravenna.

On 1 August 2019, he returned to Fermana on loan.

His contract with Carpi was terminated by mutual consent on 24 September 2020.
