= Eccellenza Marche =

- Organising body: Lega Nazionale Dilettanti
- Founded: 1991
- Country: Italy
- Confederation: UEFA
- Number of clubs: 16
- Promotion to: Serie D
- Relegation to: Promozione Marche
- League cup: Coppa Italia Dilettanti
- Current champions: Maceratese (2024–25)
- Most championships: Maceratese (4 titles)
- Website: http://www.lnd.it

Eccellenza Marche is the regional Eccellenza football division for clubs in the region of Marche, Italy. It comprises 16 teams. The winners of the Groups are promoted to Serie D. The club who finishes second also have the chance to gain promotion, they are entered into a national play-off which consists of two rounds.

== Champions ==
Below are the past champions of the Marche Eccellenza

- 1991–92 Maceratese
- 1992–93 Tolentino
- 1993–94 Jesina
- 1994–95 Sambenedettese
- 1995–96 Lucrezia
- 1996–97 Urbania
- 1997–98 Monturanese
- 1998–99 Civitanovese
- 1999–2000 Real Montecchio
- 2000–01 Cagliese
- 2001–02 Truentina
- 2002–03 Imab Urbino
- 2003–04 Pergolese
- 2004–05 Maceratese
- 2005–06 Centobuchi
- 2006–07 Recanatese
- 2007–08 Elpidiense Cascinare
- 2008–09 Fossombrone
- 2009–10 Sambenedettese
- 2010–11 Ancona 1905
- 2011–12 Maceratese
- 2012–13 Matelica
- 2013–14 Sambenedettese
- 2014–15 Folgore Veregra
- 2015–16 Civitanovese
- 2016–17 Sangiustese
- 2017–18 Montegiorgio
- 2018–19 Tolentino
- 2019–20 Castelfidardo
- 2020–21 Porto d'Ascoli
- 2021–22 Vigor Senigallia
- 2022–23 Atletico Ascoli
- 2023–24 Civitanovese
- 2024–25 Maceratese
