= 1993–94 Serie C1 =

Serie C1
- Season: 1993–94
- Champions: Chievo; Perugia
- Promoted: Chievo; Como; Perugia; Salernitana
- Relegated: Mantova (folded); Triestina (folded); Matera (disqualified); Potenza (folded); Sambenedettese (folded); Giarre (folded)
- Matches: 630

The 1993–94 Serie C1 was the sixteenth edition of Serie C1, the third highest league in the Italian football league system.

A total of 36 teams contested the league, divided into two groups (in Italian: Gironi) of 18 teams. The season was characterized by a number of bankruptcies and scandals which altered the outcomes of the final league tables.

== League tables ==
=== Group A ===
Pos	Team	Pld	W	D	L	GF	GA	GD	Pts	Promotion, qualification or relegation
1	Chievo Verona (P)	34	19	11	4	46	23	+23	68	Promotion to Serie B
2	Mantova (Note: Mantova had been relegated due to financial tricks, but then they folded.) (E, R, R)	34	18	12	4	49	29	+20	66	Phoenix in Eccellenza
3	SPAL	34	17	11	6	47	30	+17	62	Promotion play-offs
4	Bologna	34	17	7	10	41	26	+15	58	Promotion play-offs
5	Como (O, P)	34	13	12	9	45	34	+11	51	Promotion play-offs
6	Pro Sesto	34	12	11	11	36	35	+1	47	
7	Fiorenzuola	34	10	15	9	28	30	−2	45	
8	Leffe	34	10	14	10	39	36	+3	44	
9	Pistoiese	34	10	14	10	29	34	−5	44	
10	Triestina (Note: Triestina were excluded from the Lega Serie C due to financial problems.) (E, R)	34	8	19	7	32	30	+2	43	Phoenix in Amatorial Championship
11	Carpi	34	10	12	12	34	36	−2	42	
12	Carrarese	34	9	14	11	34	31	+3	41	
13	Prato	34	8	15	11	34	35	−1	39	
14	Alessandria (Note: Alessandria lost relegation play-offs that were annulled when Mantua was disqualified.) (T)	34	8	12	14	29	39	−10	36	Relegation play-off (annulled)
15	Massese	34	8	12	14	27	43	−16	36	Relegation play-off (annulled)
16	Spezia (Note: Spezia lost relegation play-offs that were annulled after its repechage.) (T)	34	5	17	12	23	43	−20	32	Relegation play-off (annulled)
17	Empoli	34	6	14	14	26	33	−7	32	Relegation play-off (annulled)
18	Palazzolo (Note: Palazzolo were reinstated through repechage following various financial collapses.) (T)	34	3	8	23	22	54	−32	17	Spared from relegation

Updated to match(es) played on 29 May 1994. Source: RSSSF.com
(E) Eliminated; (O) Play-off winners; (P) Promoted; (R) Relegated; (T) Qualified, but not yet for the particular phase indicated

==== Promotion play-offs ====
Semifinals on 5 and 12 June 1994, finals on 19 June 1994.

Semifinals
4	Bologna	0	1	1
3	SPAL	2	0	2
5	Como	2	0	2
2	Mantova	0	1	1

Finals
5	Como	2
3	SPAL	1

Como promoted to Serie B.

==== Relegation play-offs ====
First legs on 5 June 1994, return legs on 12 June 2014.

Team 1	Agg.	Team 2	1st leg	2nd leg
Empoli	1–0	Alessandria	1–0	0–0
Spezia	0–1	Massese	0–0	0–1

Later annulled; all clubs spared from relegation.

=== Group B ===
Pos	Team	Pld	W	D	L	GF	GA	GD	Pts	Promotion, qualification or relegation
1	Perugia (P)	34	20	11	3	46	17	+29	71	Promotion to Serie B
2	Reggina	34	18	10	6	36	19	+17	64	Promotion play-offs
3	Salernitana (O, P)	34	16	16	2	47	24	+23	64	Promotion play-offs
4	Lodigiani	34	14	11	9	45	31	+14	53	Promotion play-offs
5	Juve Stabia	34	13	11	10	40	34	+6	50	Promotion play-offs
6	Potenza (Note: Potenza were excluded from the Lega Serie C due to financial problems.) (E, R, R)	34	14	8	12	37	33	+4	50	Phoenix in Eccellenza
7	Casarano	34	12	13	9	37	29	+8	49	
8	Sambenedettese (Note: Sambenedettese were excluded from the Lega Serie C due to financial problems.) (E, R, R)	34	12	11	11	40	36	+4	47	Phoenix in Eccellenza
9	Avellino	34	9	14	11	30	30	0	41	
10	Ischia Isolaverde	34	9	14	11	28	29	−1	41	
11	Barletta	34	7	19	8	31	32	−1	40	
12	Siena	34	9	12	13	33	32	+1	39	
13	Matera (Note: Matera were relegated to Serie C2 due to financial tricks.) (D, R)	34	7	18	9	19	23	−4	39	Relegation to Serie C2
14	Atletico Leonzio (Note: Atletico Leonzio were moved to Catania at the end of the season to become Atletico Catania.)	34	9	10	15	30	49	−19	37	Relegation play-off (annulled)
15	Siracusa	34	6	17	11	25	29	−4	35	Relegation play-off (annulled)
16	Nola (Note: Nola lost relegation play-offs that were annulled when Matera was disqualified.) (T)	34	7	10	17	28	51	−23	31	Relegation play-off (annulled)
17	Chieti (Note: Chieti lost relegation play-offs that were annulled after its repechage.) (T)	34	5	14	15	19	44	−25	29	Relegation play-off (annulled)
18	Giarre (Note: Giarre were excluded from the Lega Serie C due to bankruptcy.) (R, E, R)	34	2	15	17	16	45	−29	21	Phoenix in Eccellenza

Updated to match(es) played on 29 May 1994. Source: RSSSF.com
(D) Disqualified; (E) Eliminated; (O) Play-off winners; (P) Promoted; (R) Relegated; (T) Qualified, but not yet for the particular phase indicated

==== Promotion play-offs ====
Semifinals on 5 and 12 June 1994, final on 22 June 1994.

Semifinals
4	Lodigiani	1	0	1
3	Salernitana	1	4	5
5	Juve Stabia	2	2	4 (aet)
2	Reggina	0	3	3 (aet)

Finals
3	Salernitana	3
5	Juve Stabia	0

Salernitana promoted to Serie B.

==== Relegation play-offs ====
First legs on 5 June 1994, return legs on 12 June 2014.

Team 1	Agg.	Team 2	1st leg	2nd leg
Chieti	0–1	Atletico Leonzio	0–0	0–1
Nola	2–3	Siracusa	2–1	0–2

Later annulled; all clubs spared from relegation.
