= 1991–92 AC Milan season =

Milan
1991–92 season
- President: Silvio Berlusconi
- Manager: Fabio Capello
- Stadium: San Siro
- Serie A: 1st
- Coppa Italia: Semi-finals
- Top goalscorer: League: Marco van Basten (25); All: Marco van Basten (29)
- Average home league attendance: 77,868
Home colours	Away colours

Associazione Calcio Milan returned to its winning ways with the appointment of Fabio Capello as the club's new manager during the 1991–92 season, following the departure of Arrigo Sacchi. Marco van Basten had his last season uninterrupted by injury, netting 25 goals, which was one of the main reasons Milan was able to overhaul Juventus to claim the Serie A title. Milan ran through entire the 34–game league season unbeaten, a feat only happened once before in Italy—Perugia in the 30-game 1978–79, although they failed to win the Serie A title—and as of 2026 has only happened once more—Juventus in the 38-game 2011–12 season. The team's unbeaten run totalled 58 matches between 1991 and 1993, a record in Italian football, encompassing the following league season as well. For their achievements, the 1991–92 Milan side received the nickname "Gli invincibili" ("The invincibles," in Italian) in the media.

== Squad ==
Note: Flags indicate national team as defined under FIFA eligibility rules; some limited exceptions apply. Players may hold more than one non-FIFA nationality.

Pos.	Nation	Player
GK	ITA	Sebastiano Rossi
GK	ITA	Francesco Antonioli
GK	ITA	Carlo Cudicini
DF	ITA	Mauro Tassotti
DF	ITA	Franco Baresi
DF	ITA	Alessandro Costacurta
DF	ITA	Filippo Galli
DF	ITA	Enzo Gambaro
DF	ITA	Paolo Maldini
MF	ITA	Demetrio Albertini

Pos.	Nation	Player
MF	ITA	Carlo Ancelotti
MF	ITA	Roberto Donadoni
MF	ITA	Diego Fuser
MF	NED	Frank Rijkaard
MF	ITA	Alberico Evani
FW	NED	Ruud Gullit
FW	ITA	Giovanni Cornacchini
FW	ITA	Daniele Massaro
FW	ITA	Aldo Serena
FW	ITA	Marco Simone
FW	NED	Marco van Basten

=== Transfers ===
In
Pos.	Name	from	Type
MF	Zvonimir Boban	Dinamo Zagreb	
FW	Aldo Serena	Inter	
DF	Enzo Gambaro	Parma	-
FW	Giovanni Cornacchini	Piacenza	
FW	Giovane Élber	Londrina	
GK	Francesco Antonioli	Modena F.C.	loan ended
MF	Demetrio Albertini	Padova	loan ended
MF	Diego Fuser	Fiorentina	loan ended

Out
Pos.	Name	To	Type
GK	Andrea Pazzagli	Bologna	
MF	Stefano Nava	Parma	
MF	Giovanni Stroppa	SS Lazio	
DF	Stefano Carobbi	Fiorentina	-
DF	Rodolfo Bandirati	Como	-
DF	Giandomenico Costi	Messina	
DF	Gianluca Grassadonia	Salernitana	
MF	Gianluca Gaudenzi	Cagliari	
FW	Massimo Agostini	Parma	
FW	Giovane Élber	Grasshoppers	loan
GK	Massimo Taibi	Como	loan
MF	Zvonimir Boban	Bari	loan

==== Winter ====
In
Pos.	Name	from	Type

Out
Pos.	Name	To	Type
MF	Angelo Carbone	Bari	

== Competitions ==
=== Serie A ===
==== League table ====
Pos	Team	Pld	W	D	L	GF	GA	GD	Pts	Qualification or relegation
1	Milan (C)	34	22	12	0	74	21	+53	56	Qualification to European Cup
2	Juventus	34	18	12	4	45	22	+23	48	Qualification to UEFA Cup
3	Torino	34	14	15	5	42	20	+22	43	Qualification to UEFA Cup
4	Napoli	34	15	12	7	56	40	+16	42	Qualification to UEFA Cup
5	Roma	34	13	14	7	37	31	+6	40	Qualification to UEFA Cup

Source: 1991–92 Serie A, RSSSF.com
Rules for classification: 1) Points; 2) Head-to-head points; 3) Head-to-head goal difference; 4) Goal difference; 5) Goals scored; 6) Draw.
(C) Champions

==== Results summary ====
Overall								Home						Away					
Pld	W	D	L	GF	GA	GD	Pts	W	D	L	GF	GA	GD	W	D	L	GF	GA	GD
34	22	12	0	74	21	+53	78	14	3	0	44	9	+35	8	9	0	30	12	+18

Source: Competitive matches

==== Results by round ====
Round	1	2	3	4	5	6	7	8	9	10	11	12	13	14	15	16	17	18	19	20	21	22	23	24	25	26	27	28	29	30	31	32	33	34
Ground	A	H	A	H	H	A	H	A	H	A	H	H	A	H	A	H	A	H	H	A	H	A	A	H	A	H	A	H	A	H	A	H	A	H
Result	W	W	D	D	D	W	W	W	W	W	D	W	D	W	D	W	W	W	W	W	D	D	D	W	W	W	D	W	D	W	D	W	D	W
Position	4	2	3	2	8	3	1	1	1	1	1	1	1	1	1	1	1	1	1	1	1	1	1	1	1	1	1	1	1	1	1	1	1	1

Source: Competitive matches
A = Away; H = Home; W = Win; D = Draw; L = Loss; = 1992–93 European Cup; = 1992–93 UEFA Cup

==== Matches ====
1 September 1991 1	Ascoli	0–1	Milan	Ascoli Piceno
		Report	39' (o.g.) Benetti	Stadium: Stadio Cino e Lillo Del Duca; Attendance: 34 581; Referee: Luci

8 September 1991 2	Milan	1–0	Cagliari	Milan
	van Basten 1' (pen.)	Report		Stadium: San Siro; Attendance: 71 634; Referee: Cornieti

15 September 1991 3	Juventus	1–1	Milan	Turin
	Casiraghi 13'	Report	Carrera 90' (o.g.)	Stadium: delle Alpi; Attendance: 63 867; Referee: D'Elia

22 September 1991 4	Milan	1–1	Fiorentina	Milan
	van Basten 86' (pen.)	Report	Maiellaro 62'	Stadium: San Siro; Attendance: 72 512; Referee: Pairetto

29 September 1991 5	Milan	1–1	Genoa	Milan
	van Basten 85' (pen.)	Report	Skuhravý 12'	Stadium: San Siro; Attendance: 76 900; Referee: Luci

6 October 1991 6	Atalanta	0–2	Milan	Bergamo
		Report	van Basten 3'; Albertini 48'	Stadium: Comunale; Attendance: 27 934; Referee: Nicchi

20 October 1991 7	Milan	2–0	Parma	Milan
	Gullit 59' van Basten 81'	Report		Stadium: San Siro; Attendance: 74 929; Referee: Stafoggia

27 October 1991 8	Bari	0–1	Milan	Bari
		Report	Massaro 30'	Stadium: della Vittoria; Attendance: 51 853; Referee: Baldas

3 November 1991 9	Milan	4–1	Roma	Milan
	van Basten 30'; Massaro 36'; Rijkaard 57'; Costacurta 78'	Report	Carnevale 59'	Stadium: San Siro; Attendance: 70 000; Referee: Cesari

17 November 1991 10	Sampdoria	0–2	Milan	Genova
		Report	Gullit 65', 70'	Stadium: Luigi Ferraris; Attendance: 37 877; Referee: Lanese

24 November 1991 11	Milan	3–1	Cremonese	Milan
	van Basten 24'; Gullit 37'; Fuser 76'	Report	Giandebiaggi 54'	Stadium: San Siro; Attendance: 66 434; Referee: Boggi

1 December 1991 12	Inter	1–1	Milan	Milan
	Klinsmann 54'	Report	van Basten 18'	Stadium: Giuseppe Meazza; Attendance: 80 288; Referee: Pairetto

8 December 1991 13	Milan	2–0	Torino	Milan
	Gullit 18'; Massaro 47'	Report		Stadium: San Siro; Attendance: 70 452; Referee: D'Elia

15 December 1991 14	SS Lazio	1–1	Milan	Rome
	Riedle 51'	Report	van Basten 54'	Stadium: Olimpico; Attendance: 51 630; Referee: Ceccarini

5 January 1992 15	Milan	5–0	Napoli	Milan
	Maldini 1'; Rijkaard 27'; Massaro 42'; Donadoni 65' van Basten 81'	Report		Stadium: San Siro; Attendance: 79 965; Referee: Sguizzato

12 January 1992 16	Hellas Verona	0–1	Milan	Verona
		Report	Icardi 31' (o.g.)	Stadium: Marcantonio Bentegodi; Attendance: 37 330; Referee: Trentalange

19 January 1992 17	Milan	3–1	Foggia	Milan
	van Basten 10' (pen.), 47', 85' (pen.)	Report	Shalimov 64'	Stadium: San Siro; Attendance: 79 560; Referee: Beschin

26 January 1992 18	Milan	4–1	Ascoli	Milan
	Simone 7'; Maldini 35'; Rijkaard 62'; Albertini 68'	Report	D'Ainzara 48'	Stadium: San Siro; Attendance: 63 258; Referee: Bettin

2 February 1992 19	Cagliari	1–4	Milan	Cagliari
	Bisoli 3'	Report	van Basten 53', 69', 71' (pen.); Massaro 77'	Stadium: Sant'Elia; Attendance: 35 975; Referee: Stafoggia

9 February 1992 20	Milan	1–1	Juventus	Milan
	van Basten 4'	Report	Casiraghi 26'	Stadium: San Siro; Attendance: 83 915; Referee: Baldas

16 February 1992 21	Fiorentina	0–0	Milan	Florence
		Report		Stadium: Artemio Franchi; Attendance: 41 661; Referee: Cesari

23 February 1992 22	Genoa	0–0	Milan	Genoa
		Report		Stadium: Luigi Ferraris; Attendance: 37 229; Referee: Sguizzato

1 March 1992 23	Milan	3–1	Atalanta	Milan
	van Basten 34' (pen.), 36', 40'	Report	Bianchezi 8'	Stadium: San Siro; Attendance: 72 408; Referee: Ceccarini

8 March 1992 24	Parma	1–3	Milan	Parma
	Melli 33'	Report	Simone 48', 76'; Grün 84' (o.g.)	Stadium: Ennio Tardini; Attendance: 25 428; Referee: D'Elia

15 March 1992 25	Milan	2–0	Bari	Milan
	Simone 38' van Basten 71'	Report		Stadium: San Siro; Attendance: 74 811; Referee: Cinciripini

29 March 1992 26	AS Roma	1–1	Milan	Rome
	Rizzitelli 69'	Report	Simone 4'	Stadium: Olimpico; Attendance: 62 079; Referee: Lanese

5 April 1992 27	Milan	5–1	Sampdoria	Milan
	Rijkaard 34'; Evani 54' van Basten 62'; Massaro 82'; Albertini 86'	Report	Vialli 84'	Stadium: San Siro; Attendance: 73 965; Referee: Mughetti

12 April 1992 28	Cremonese	1–1	Milan	Cremona
	Iacobelli 75'	Report	Bonomi 40' (o.g.)	Stadium: Giovanni Zini; Attendance: 16 936; Referee: Quartuccio

18 April 1992 29	Milan	1–0	Inter	Milan
	Massaro 89'	Report		Stadium: San Siro; Attendance: 82 584; Referee: Cesari

26 April 1992 30	Torino	2–2	Milan	Turin
	Casagrande 8'; Ancelotti 62' (o.g.)	Report	Massaro 18'; Fuser 72'	Stadium: delle Alpi; Attendance: 39 628; Referee: Pezzella

3 May 1992 31	Milan	2–0	SS Lazio	Milan
	Massaro 25'; Fuser 84'	Report		Stadium: San Siro; Attendance: 75 581; Referee: Nicchi

10 May 1992 32	SSC Napoli	1–1	Milan	Naples
	Blanc 62'	Report	Rijkaard 37'	Stadium: San Paolo; Attendance: 72 646; Referee: Pairetto

17 May 1992 33	Milan	4–0	Verona	Milan
	van Basten 18'; Gullit 46'; Ancelotti 77', 78'	Report		Stadium: San Siro; Attendance: 81 256; Referee: Fabricatore

24 May 1992 34	Foggia	2–8	Milan	Foggia
	Signori 39'; Baiano 41'	Report	Maldini 22'; Gullit 47' van Basten 52', 82'; Matrecano 59' (o.g.); Simone 72', 74'; Fuser 87'	Stadium: Pino Zaccheria; Attendance: 22 835; Referee: Collina

=== Coppa Italia ===
Round of 16

28 August 1991	Milan	2–0	Brescia	Milan
	Gullit 34' van Basten 80' (pen.)	Report		Stadium: Giuseppe Meazza; Attendance: 12 140; Referee: Felicani

4 September 1991	Brescia	1–2	Milan	Brescia
	Passiatore 92'	Report	43' Galli; 49' (pen.) van Basten	Stadium: Mario Rigamonti; Attendance: 20 000; Referee: Sguizzato

Eightfinals

30 October 1991	Hellas Verona	2–2	Milan	Verona
	Prytz 25' (pen.), 66'	Report	18' Maldini; 27' van Basten	Stadium: Marcantonio Bentegodi; Attendance: 14 075; Referee: Trentalange

11 December 1991	Milan	1–1	Hellas Verona	Milan
	van Basten 43' (pen.)	Report	75' Lunini	Stadium: Giuseppe Meazza; Attendance: 4432; Referee: Cornieti

Quarterfinals

11 February 1992	Milan	2–0	Torino	Milan
	Baresi 30'; Simone 53'	Report		Stadium: Giuseppe Meazza; Attendance: 7 624; Referee: Ceccarini

26 February 1992	Torino	1–1	Milan	Turin
	Lentini 79'	Report	23' (o.g.) Bruno	Stadium: delle Alpi; Attendance: 23 105; Referee: Luci

Semifinals

31 March 1992	Milan	0–0	Juventus	Milan
		Report		Stadium: Giuseppe Meazza; Attendance: 73 114; Referee: D'Elia

14 April 1992	Juventus	1–0 (1–0 agg.)	Milan	Turin
	Schillaci 22'	Report		Stadium: delle Alpi; Attendance: 57 354; Referee: Amendolia

== Statistics ==
=== Players statistics ===
No.	Pos	Nat	Player	Total		Serie A		Coppa Italia	
No.	Pos	Nat	Player	Apps	Goals	Apps	Goals	Apps	Goals
	GK	(Italy) ITA	Rossi	32	-19	30	-18	2	-1
	DF	(Italy) ITA	Tassotti	38	0	33	0	5	0
	DF	(Italy) ITA	Costacurta	36	1	29+1	1	6	0
	DF	(Italy) ITA	Baresi	39	2	33	1	6	1
	DF	(Italy) ITA	Maldini	38	4	31	3	7	1
	MF	(Italy) ITA	Donadoni	36	1	25+5	1	6	0
	MF	(Italy) ITA	Albertini	33	3	22+6	3	5	0
	MF	(Netherlands) NED	Rijkaard	35	5	30	5	5	0
	MF	(Italy) ITA	Evani	31	1	24+3	1	4	0
	FW	(Italy) ITA	Massaro	38	9	26+6	9	6	0
	FW	(Netherlands) NED	Van Basten	38	29	31	25	7	4
	GK	(Italy) ITA	Antonioli	11	-8	4	-3	7	-5
	FW	(Netherlands) NED	Gullit	27	8	25+1	7	1	1
	MF	(Italy) ITA	Ancelotti	18	2	10+2	2	6	0
	FW	(Italy) ITA	Simone	19	8	7+8	7	4	1
	DF	(Italy) ITA	Galli	13	1	6+2	0	5	1
	DF	(Italy) ITA	Gambaro	9	0	4+1	0	4	0
	MF	(Italy) ITA	Fuser	22	4	2+13	4	7	0
	FW	(Italy) ITA	Serena	15	0	2+7	0	6	0
	FW	(Italy) ITA	Cornacchini	5	0	0+3	0	2	0
	GK	(Italy) ITA	Cudicini	0	0	0	0	0	0

- Source: http://calcio-seriea.net/presenze/1991/1017/

== See also ==
- List of unbeaten football club seasons
