= Eccellenza Umbria =

- Organising body: Lega Nazionale Dilettanti
- Founded: 1991
- Country: Italy
- Confederation: UEFA
- Number of clubs: 16
- Promotion to: Serie D
- Relegation to: Promozione Umbria
- League cup: Coppa Italia Dilettanti
- Current champions: Sansepolcro (2024–25)
- Most championships: Orvietana, Sansepolcro (3 titles each)
- Website: http://www.lnd.it

Eccellenza Umbria is the regional Eccellenza football division for clubs in the central Italian region of Umbria, Italy. It is competed among 16 teams, in one group. The winners of the Groups are promoted to Serie D. The club who finishes second also have the chance to gain promotion, they are entered into a national play-off which consists of two rounds.

== Champions ==
Here are the past champions of the Umbria Eccellenza, organised into their respective seasons.

- 1991–92 Pontevecchio
- 1992–93 Città di Castello
- 1993–94 Sansepolcro
- 1994–95 Nestor Marsciano
- 1995–96 Ellera
- 1996–97 Gubbio
- 1997–98 Orvietana
- 1998–99 Tiberis Umbertide
- 1999–2000 Todi
- 2000–01 Orvietana
- 2001–02 Angelana
- 2002–03 Foligno
- 2003–04 Voluntas Spoleto
- 2004–05 Narnese
- 2005–06 Arrone
- 2006–07 Pontevecchio
- 2007–08 Deruta
- 2008–09 Group Città di Castello
- 2009–10 Todi
- 2010–11 Pierantonio
- 2011–12 Bastia
- 2012–13 Narnese
- 2013–14 Villabiagio
- 2014–15 Città di Castello
- 2015–16 Trestina
- 2016–17 Villabiagio
- 2017–18 Bastia
- 2018–19 Foligno
- 2019–20 Tiferno Lerchi
- 2020–21 Not awarded
- 2021–22 Orvietana
- 2022–23 Sansepolcro
- 2023–24 Fulgens Foligno
- 2024–25 Sansepolcro
