= Albiano =

- Comune
- Comune di Albiano
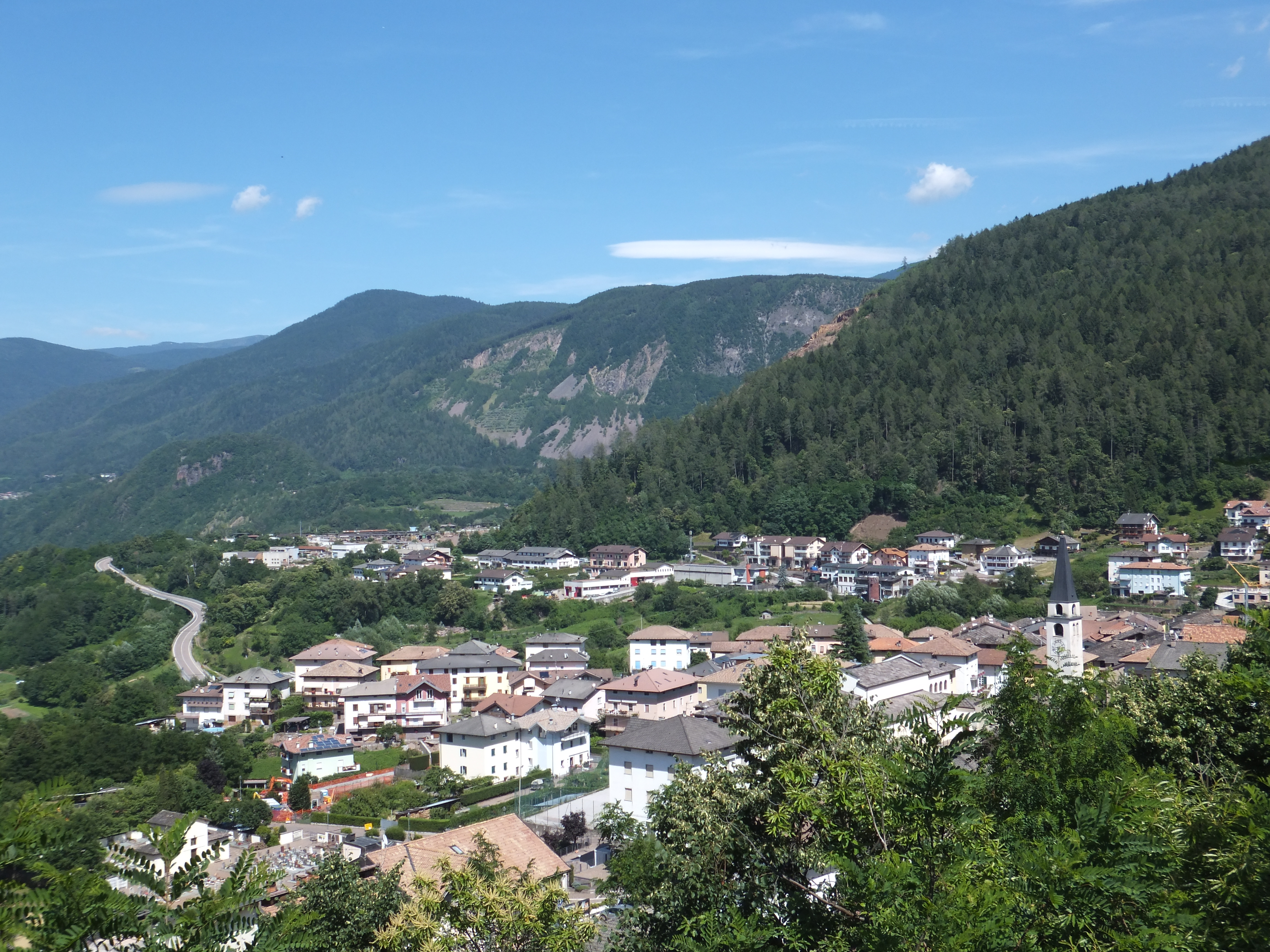

- Location of Albiano in Italy Albiano (Trentino-Alto Adige/Südtirol)
- Coordinates: 46°9′N 11°12′E
- Country: Italy
- Region: Trentino-Alto Adige/Südtirol
- Province: Trentino (TN)
- Frazioni: Barco di Sopra, Barco di Sotto

Government
  - Mayor: Maurizio Gilli

Area
  - Total: 9 km^{2} (3.5 sq mi)
- Elevation: 644 m (2,113 ft)

Population (2026)
  - Total: 1,549
  - Density: 170/km^{2} (450/sq mi)
- Time zone: UTC+1 (CET)
  - Summer (DST): UTC+2 (CEST)
- Postal code: 38041
- Dialing code: 0461
- Website: Official website

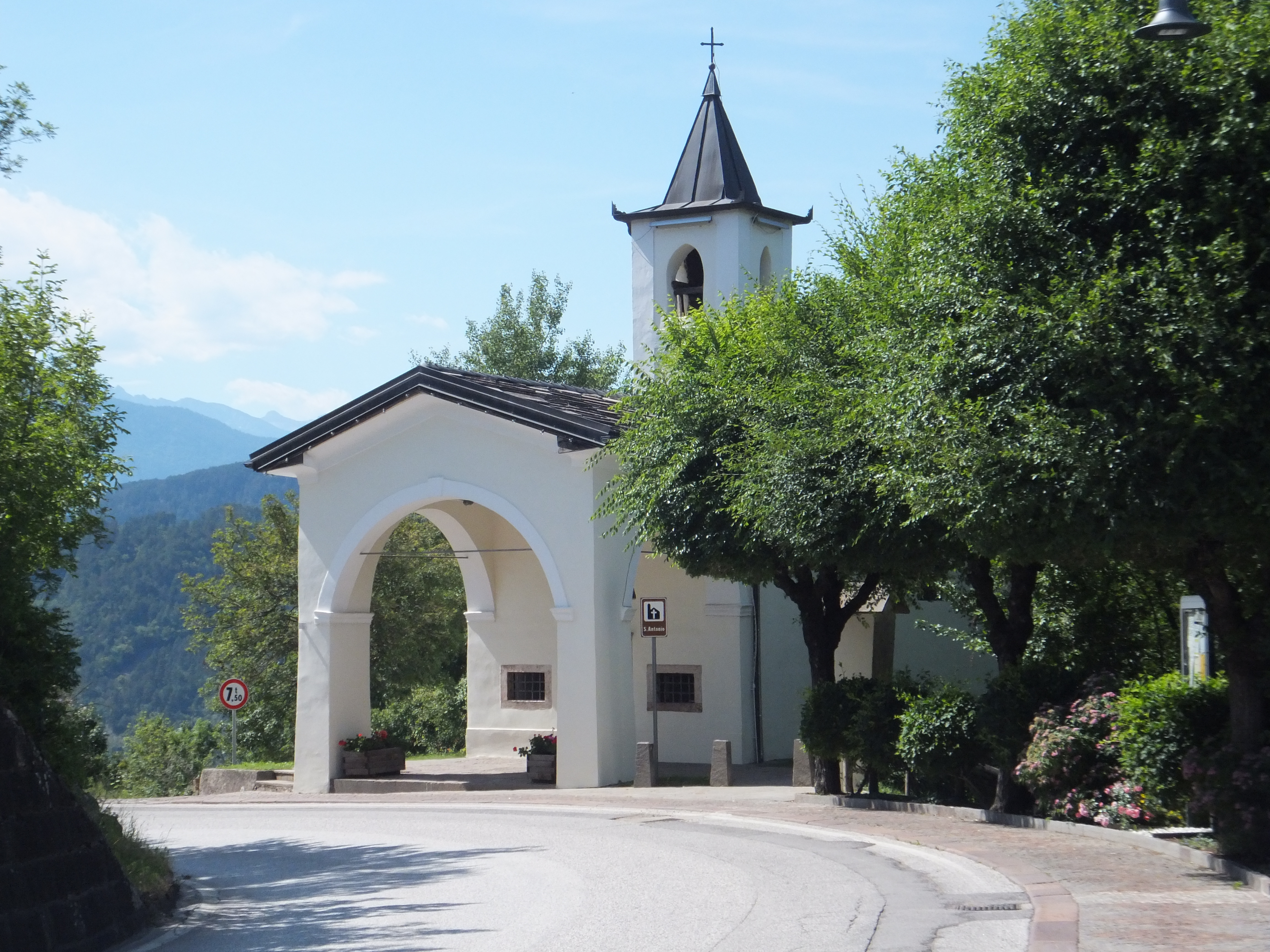
Sant'Antonio da Padova church

Albiano is a comune in the autonomous province of Trentino in north Italy.

== Sport ==
The local amateur football club, A.S.D. Porfido Albiano, currently plays in the Eccellenza Trentino-Alto Adige/Südtirol.
