= Loris Tortori =

Italian footballer

Personal information
- Date of birth: 13 October 1988 (age 38)
- Place of birth: Rome, Italy
- Height: 1.71 m (5 ft 7 1/2 in)
- Position: Forward

Team information
- Current team: Virtus
- Number: 14

Youth career
- –2007: Lazio

Senior career*
Years	Team	Apps	(Gls)
2007–2008	Cynthia	33	(8)
2008–2009	Isola Liri	25	(2)
2009–2013	Paganese	91	(16)
2011–2012	→ Latina (loan)	20	(3)
2013–2015	Melfi	48	(17)
2015–2016	FeralpiSalò	33	(7)
2016–2018	Venezia	23	(1)
2017	→ Viterbese (loan)	17	(0)
2018	→ Carrarese (loan)	13	(1)
2018–2019	Cesena	29	(5)
2019–2020	Foggia	22	(4)
2020–2021	Forlì	21	(0)
2021–2022	Fano	29	(10)
2023–	Virtus	66	(24)
- * Club domestic league appearances and goals as of 1 July 2025

Loris Tortori (born 13 October 1988) is an Italian football player. He plays for Virtus.

== Club career ==
He made his Serie C debut for Paganese on 23 August 2009 in a game against Lecco.

On 10 September 2019, he joined Foggia.
