= Giovanni Pisano (footballer) =

Italian footballer

Personal information
- Full name: Giovanni Pisano
- Date of birth: 5 October 1968 (age 58)
- Place of birth: Syracuse, Italy
- Height: 1.80 m (5 ft 11 in)
- Position: Forward

Youth career
- Siracusa

Senior career*
| Years | Team | Apps | (Gls) |
| 1984–1985 | Siracusa | 0 | (0) |
| 1985–1986 | Modica | 28 | (3) |
| 1986–1987 | Vittoria | ? | (0) |
| 1987–1989 | Niscemi | 57 | (28) |
| 1989–1991 | Enna | 54 | (24) |
| 1991–1992 | Leonzio | 35 | (12) |
| 1992–1993 | Foggia | 1 | (0) |
| 1993–1996 | Salernitana | 122 | (60) |
| 1996 | Genoa | 28 | (15) |
| 1997–1999 | Pescara | 54 | (15) |
| 1999–2001 | Cosenza | 49 | (12) |
| 2001–2003 | Spezia | 56 | (32) |
| 2003–2004 | Vittoria | 30 | (14) |
| 2004–2006 | Siracusa | 29 | (16) |
| 2006 | Vittoria | 14 | (1) |
| 2006–2007 | Budoni | 18 | (6) |
| 2007–2008 | Belvedere | 27 | (17) |
| 2008–2009 | Palazzolo | 9 | (3) |
| 2009 | Biancavilla | 32 | (6) |
| 2009–2010 | Real Avola | 22 | (4) |
| Total | | 665 | (268) |

Managerial career
- 2013–2014: Salernitana (youth)
- 2014–2015: Balotești
- 2015: Caransebeș
- 2016: Modica
- 2017: Lusitano de Évora
- 2017–2018: Isola Capo
- 2018–2019: Anzio
- * Club domestic league appearances and goals as of 9 November 2024

Giovanni Pisano (born 5 October 1968), is an Italian former professional footballer who played as a forward.

== Career ==
Revealed by Siracusa, Pisano spent the first part of his career playing for Sicilian teams. He was Interregionale champion with Enna, which caught the attention of Foggia, making his Serie A debut in the 1992–93 season. He transferred to Salernitana the following season, the team for which he played the most in his career, and was the top scorer in the 1994–95 Serie B while playing for the club, scoring 21 goals in total. Pisano also played in Serie B for Genoa and Pescara, and in the final part of his career, he returned to play for modest teams in Sicily.

== Managerial career ==
Pisano began his career as a coach in 2013–14, in the youth sectors of Salernitana. He also served as manager on the teams of Balotești and Caransebeș in the Romanian Liga II, G.D. Lusitano in the regional divisions of Portugal, and Serie D teams such as Isola Capo and Anzio.

== Honours ==
Enna

- Serie D: 1989–90 (group N)

Individual

- 1994–95 Serie B top scorer: 21 goals
