= Orvietana Calcio =

Italian football club

Orvietana
- Full name: Orvietana Calcio
- Founded: 1910
- Ground: Stadio Luigi Muzi, Orvieto, Italy
- Capacity: 2,000
- Chairman: Alessandro Paci; Roberto Biagioli
- Manager: Alessandro Cavalli
- League: Eccellenza Umbria
- 2011–12: Serie D/E, 14th
Home colours	Away colours

Orvietana Calcio is an Italian association football club located in Orvieto, Umbria. It currently plays in Serie D.

== History ==
It was founded in 1910.

In the season 2011–12 it was relegated to Eccellenza.

== Colors and badge ==
Its colors are red and white.

== Participation history ==
- Second Division: 1931–33
- Serie C: 1947–48
- Serie D: 1967–78
- Promozione (Promotion): 1992–93
- Eccelenza: 1993–2001
- Serie D: 2001–12

== League and cup history ==
Season	A	Tier 2	Tier 3	D	E	Tier 6	Tier 7	Tier 8	Pts.	Pl.	W	L	T	GF	GA	GD
2010–11				14					37	34	10	17	7	39	50	−11
