= Alma Juventus Fano 1906 =

Italian football club

Fano
- Full name: Alma Juventus Fano 1906
- Nickname: Granata (The Maroons)
- Founded: 1906
- Ground: Stadio Raffaele Mancini, Fano, Italy
- Capacity: 8,800
- Chairman: Salvatore Guida
- Manager: Giovanni Cornacchini
- League: Eccellenza Marche
- 2023–24: Serie D Group F, 16th of 18 (relegated)
- Website: www.almajuventusfano1906.com
Home colours	Away colours

Former club crest

Alma Juventus Fano 1906, commonly known as Fano, is an Italian association football club located in Fano, Marche. The club currently plays in Eccellenza, the fifth tier of Italian football.

== History ==
The club was founded in 1906 as Società Ginnastica Alma Juventus Fano, named by a professor of Latin "Liceo Guido Nolfi" di Fano.

The first team was called Fanum Fortunae and followed by Emilio Caiani of Milan who imported the not so famous football.

On 13 May 1915, in Circolo di San Paterniano, the city's patron, was born Alma Juventus Football Club among young players.

In 1925 the company raced the first regional championship of Marche, Terza Divisione.

In 1930 was inaugurated the new stadium "Borgo Metauro" now entitled to a player who played in the series of Fano further, Raffaele Mancini.

In 1935 it competed for the first time in Serie C, playing against famous teams such as Venezia, Vicenza, Rimini, Udinese, Treviso, Ancona, Mantova. That year, it also played a game against Milan.

During the fascist, eagle with the beam was the symbol of the team. After World War II the beam was replaced with the coat of arms.

Fano spend many years in Serie C1 and Serie C2, but didn't achieve promotion to Serie B. Some years Fano had been relegated to Serie D.

In the 2008–09 season Fano, which was playing in Serie D, after have been leading the championship for many turns, in the last days was exceeded by Pro Vasto, and finished second in the league, a position that allowed it to play in the playoffs and to participate in the 2009–10 Coppa Italia against Lumezzane.

In the 2009–2010 season the company was repechage in the Lega Pro Seconda Divisione after the failure of some companies. The last three seasons in Lega Pro Seconda Divisione Fano played in this category.

== Colors and badge ==
The club's official color is garnet, a dark red color.

== Home stadium ==
Stadio Raffaele Mancini, (1930–present)
Via Arturo Toscanini, 12, Fano, Italy 61032

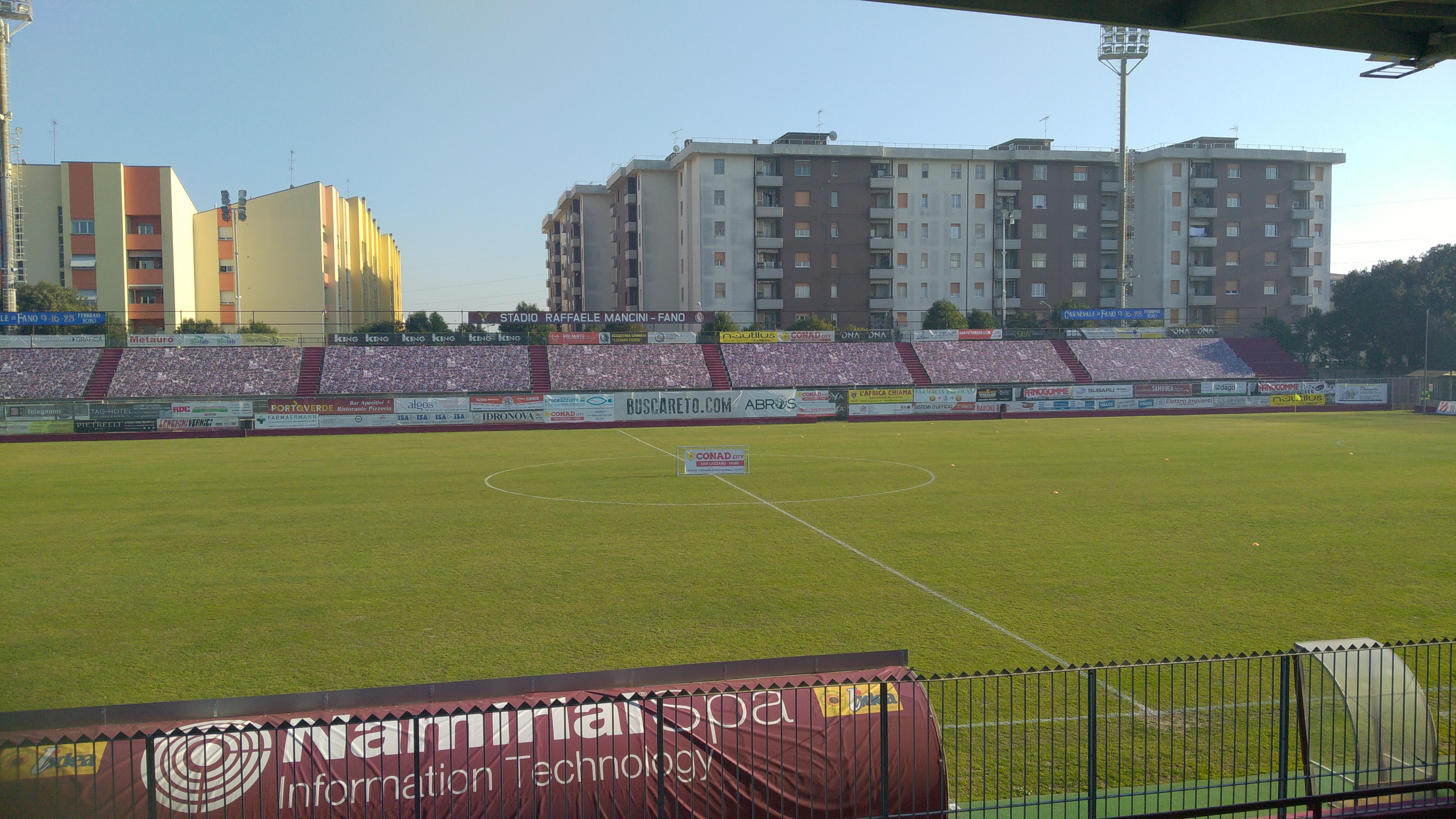
Raffaele Mancini stadium

The Raffaele Mancini stadium exists since 1930 and hasn't changed much since then. Only the main grandstand received cover and over 500 seats, while to remaining stands, one alongside and one at end-side, remain uncovered terracing. When opened, it was commonly known as Borgo Metauro, but later adapted the name of Stadio Raffaele Mancini, honoring a player that ended his career with the team.

== Squad ==
As of 9 September 2022

Note: Flags indicate national team as defined under FIFA eligibility rules; some limited exceptions apply. Players may hold more than one non-FIFA nationality.

No.	Pos.	Nation	Player
—	GK	ITA	Riccardo Tolomeo
—	GK	GRE	Christos Tzafestas (on loan from Kerkyra)
—	DF	ITA	Samuel Delli Carri
—	DF	ITA	Matteo Del Rosso (on loan from Fermana)
—	DF	SOM	Abel Gigli
—	DF	ITA	Matteo Gualtieri
—	DF	ITA	Francesco Martignetti (on loan from Campobasso)
—	DF	ITA	Alessandro Tomassini
—	DF	ITA	Gabriele Vavassori
—	DF	ITA	Alessandro Zanolla
—	MF	ITA	Stefano Antezza
—	MF	ITA	Francesco Falivene
—	MF	ITA	Tommaso Fontana
—	MF	ALB	Mateo Likaxhiu

No.	Pos.	Nation	Player
—	MF	SEN	Bachir Mané
—	MF	ITA	Giovanni Pierpaoli
—	MF	ITA	Luca Ricci
—	FW	FRA	Stephane Anoumou
—	FW	ITA	Antonio Broso
—	FW	ITA	Francesco Casolla
—	FW	ITA	Vittorio Esposito
—	FW	ITA	Giuliano Maglie (on loan from Sampdoria)
—	FW	BEL	Badr Oulad Abdellah
—	FW	ITA	Nicola Russo
—	FW	ITA	Paolo Serafino (on loan from Brindisi)
—	FW	ITA	Giuseppe Serges
—	FW	ITA	Loris Tortori

== Management ==
- Technical director – (Italy) Giovanni Mei
- Head coach – (Italy) Marco Alessandrini
- Goalkeeping coach – (Italy) Giovanni Bacchiocchi
- Fitness coach – (Italy) Massimo Scardovi

== Notable former players ==
The following players have either played at the professional or international level, either before or after playing for Fano Alma Juventus:

- (Italy) Raffaele Mancini
- (Italy) Giovanni Cornacchini
- (Italy) Andrea Lazzari
- (Italy) Dario Hubner
- (Italy) Max Tonetto
- (Italy) Lamberto Zauli
