= Eccellenza Trentino-Alto Adige/Südtirol =

- Organising body: Lega Nazionale Dilettanti
- Founded: 1991
- Country: Italy
- Confederation: UEFA
- Number of clubs: 16
- Promotion to: Serie D
- Relegation to: Promozione Trentino-Alto Adige/Südtirol
- League cup: Coppa Italia Dilettanti
- Current champions: Obermais (2024–25)
- Most championships: Arco, Rovereto, Trento, Virtus Bolzano (3 titles each)
- Website: http://www.lnd.it

Eccellenza Trentino-Alto Adige/Südtirol (Italian: Eccellenza Trentino-Alto Adige) is the regional Eccellenza football division for clubs in the northern Italian region of Trentino-Alto Adige/Südtirol, Italy. It is competed among 16 teams, in one group. The winners of the Groups are promoted to Serie D. The club who finishes second also have the chance to gain promotion, they are entered into a national play-off which consists of two rounds.

== Champions ==
Here are the past champions of the Trentino-Alto Adige/Südtirol Eccellenza, organised into their respective seasons.

- 1991–92 Passirio Merano
- 1992–93 Rovereto
- 1993–94 Arco
- 1994–95 Settaurense
- 1995–96 Arco
- 1996–97 Südtirol
- 1997–98 Rovereto
- 1998–99 Mezzocorona
- 1999–2000 Condinese
- 2000–01 Rovereto
- 2001–02 Mezzocorona
- 2002–03 Bolzano
- 2003–04 Arco
- 2004–05 Vallagarina
- 2005–06 Porfido Albiano
- 2006–07 Alta Vallagarina
- 2007–08 Bolzano
- 2008–09 Porfido Albiano
- 2009–10 Trento
- 2010–11 St. Georgen
- 2011–12 Fersina Perginese
- 2012–13 Dro
- 2013–14 Mori Santo Stefano
- 2014–15 Levico Terme
- 2015–16 Virtus Bolzano
- 2016–17 Trento
- 2017–18 Virtus Bolzano
- 2018–19 Dro
- 2019–20 Trento
- 2020–21 Levico
- 2021–22 Virtus Bolzano
- 2022–23 Mori Santo Stefano
- 2023–24 Lavis
- 2024–25 Obermais
