= 1994–95 Serie B =

Italian football league season

Serie B
- Season: 1994–95
- Promoted: Piacenza (1st title); Udinese; Vicenza; Atalanta
- Relegated: Acireale; Ascoli; Como; Lecce
- Matches: 380
- Goals: 866 (2.28 per match)
- Top goalscorer: (Italy) Giovanni Pisano (21 goals)

Serie B 1994-95 team distribution

The Serie B 1994–95 was the sixty-third tournament of this competition played in Italy since its creation.

== Teams ==
Chievo, Como, Perugia and Salernitana had been promoted from Serie C, while Piacenza, Udinese, Atalanta and Lecce had been relegated from Serie A.

== Events ==
Three points for a win were introduced.

The Derby della Scala had its first edition.

== Final classification ==
Pos	Team	Pld	W	D	L	GF	GA	GD	Pts	Promotion or relegation
1	Piacenza (P, C)	38	19	14	5	55	27	+28	71	Promotion to Serie A
2	Udinese (P)	38	19	13	6	63	35	+28	70	Promotion to Serie A
3	Vicenza (P)	38	17	17	4	54	26	+28	68	Promotion to Serie A
4	Atalanta (P)	38	17	15	6	49	36	+13	66	Promotion to Serie A
5	Salernitana	38	16	13	9	57	40	+17	61	
6	Ancona	38	16	10	12	55	50	+5	58	
7	Perugia	38	12	18	8	47	35	+12	54	
8	Cesena	38	12	15	11	44	43	+1	51	
9	Venezia	38	14	8	16	46	44	+2	50	
10	Hellas Verona	38	11	15	12	40	40	0	48	
11	Pescara	38	11	13	14	50	63	−13	46	
12	Palermo	38	10	14	14	33	35	−2	44	
13	Fidelis Andria	38	8	20	10	36	41	−5	44	
14	Chievo	38	10	14	14	35	38	−3	44	
15	Cosenza (Note: 9 points deducted)	38	11	18	9	38	35	+3	42	
16	Lucchese	38	8	18	12	49	54	−5	42	
17	Acireale (R)	38	10	11	17	27	42	−15	41	Relegation to Serie C1
18	Ascoli (R)	38	7	13	18	27	57	−30	34	Relegation to Serie C1
19	Como (R)	38	7	12	19	25	58	−33	33	Relegation to Serie C1
20	Lecce (R)	38	5	9	24	36	67	−31	24	Relegation to Serie C1

Source: Almanacco Illustrato del Calcio - La Storia 1898-2004, Panini Edizioni, Modena, September 2005
Rules for classification: 1) points; 2) head-to-head points; 3) head-to-head goal difference; 4) head-to-head goals scored; 5) goal difference; 6) number of goals scored.
(C) Champions; (P) Promoted; (R) Relegated

== Results ==
Home \ Away	ACR	ANC	ASC	ATA	CES	CHV	COM	COS	FAN	LCE	LUC	PAL	PER	PES	PIA	SAL	UDI	VEN	HEL	VIC
Acireale	—	1–1	0–1	2–0	1–1	0–3	1–0	2–1	0–0	2–0	3–0	3–1	0–0	2–0	1–0	1–3	0–1	1–0	1–1	0–0
Ancona	3–0	—	1–1	4–2	2–1	0–1	2–1	1–2	2–1	3–0	1–1	1–0	4–3	3–3	2–1	1–1	1–3	1–0	3–0	2–1
Ascoli	0–0	2–0	—	0–1	0–0	0–0	0–0	0–0	0–0	5–4	2–0	1–0	1–1	3–0	0–2	0–2	1–5	0–0	0–0	0–0
Atalanta	1–0	0–0	1–0	—	1–1	3–2	3–0	1–0	2–1	1–1	1–0	2–0	2–2	3–0	0–0	2–1	2–0	0–3	0–1	0–0
Cesena	2–0	3–2	1–0	1–2	—	2–1	1–1	0–2	4–0	2–1	3–0	1–0	1–1	0–0	1–1	3–0	2–1	1–2	1–3	1–0
Chievo	2–1	2–3	1–1	1–1	0–0	—	0–0	1–0	1–2	0–0	4–1	0–3	0–1	3–1	0–1	1–3	0–1	2–1	3–1	1–4
Como	0–1	1–3	3–1	0–0	2–0	0–0	—	1–0	2–0	1–0	2–1	0–0	0–0	1–1	1–3	1–4	1–4	1–3	0–0	0–0
Cosenza	1–0	0–1	3–1	1–1	0–0	0–0	1–0	—	0–0	2–1	3–2	0–0	0–0	1–1	1–1	0–0	1–0	0–1	1–1	2–2
Fidelis Andria	0–0	1–0	3–1	0–0	1–1	0–0	4–0	1–1	—	1–0	3–1	1–1	1–1	2–2	1–1	1–1	1–3	2–2	1–0	1–1
Lecce	0–0	1–2	1–0	0–1	0–0	3–1	1–0	1–2	0–1	—	1–1	1–7	1–4	4–5	1–2	1–2	2–2	1–1	1–0	2–3
Lucchese	2–1	1–1	5–1	1–1	1–1	0–0	5–1	2–2	2–2	1–0	—	3–0	1–1	2–2	1–0	1–1	3–3	1–1	0–1	2–0
Palermo	0–0	2–0	2–0	0–1	0–0	0–0	3–3	2–1	1–1	2–0	2–0	—	1–0	1–1	0–2	0–0	0–0	2–0	1–0	0–0
Perugia	2–2	2–0	3–1	0–0	1–1	2–1	6–0	0–0	0–0	3–1	1–1	1–0	—	1–0	1–1	1–2	1–0	2–0	3–4	1–1
Pescara	3–0	4–2	0–3	5–4	2–0	1–0	2–0	1–1	1–0	2–1	1–3	2–0	0–0	—	1–2	1–4	1–1	1–0	0–0	1–1
Piacenza	2–0	2–0	4–0	1–5	1–1	0–0	1–0	0–0	3–1	0–0	1–1	3–0	1–0	2–0	—	5–0	2–2	2–1	1–0	3–1
Salernitana	2–0	2–0	2–0	1–1	5–2	0–1	4–0	5–2	1–0	1–1	1–1	0–0	1–0	1–1	0–1	—	1–1	0–0	4–1	0–1
Udinese	3–0	2–2	3–1	1–1	2–0	1–0	1–1	1–0	3–1	3–2	0–0	0–0	0–1	2–1	1–0	1–1	—	3–1	4–1	0–0
Venezia	3–1	1–0	4–0	2–3	0–2	0–2	0–1	2–3	1–1	2–1	3–1	2–1	2–0	2–0	0–0	1–0	1–3	—	1–0	1–2
Hellas Verona	1–0	1–1	5–0	0–0	1–0	1–1	1–0	1–3	0–0	0–1	1–1	1–0	0–0	5–2	3–3	4–1	0–1	1–1	—	0–0
Vicenza	2–0	0–0	0–0	4–0	6–3	0–0	1–0	1–1	2–0	2–0	2–0	4–1	4–1	3–1	0–0	2–0	2–1	2–1	0–0	—

Source: Almanacco Illustrato del Calcio - La Storia 1898-2004, Panini Edizioni, Modena, September 2005
Legend: Blue = home team win; Yellow = draw; Red = away team win.

== Attendances ==
#	Club	Average
1	Salernitana	18,914
2	Atalanta	15,135
3	Palermo	13,152
4	Vicenza	11,802
5	Udinese	11,749
6	Perugia	10,665
7	Hellas	10,015
8	Piacenza	7,717
9	Pescara	6,493
10	Cosenza	6,127
11	Ancona	6,063
12	Cesena	5,171
13	Fidelis Andria	4,748
14	Lucchese	4,697
15	Ascoli	4,632
16	Lecce	4,592
17	Venezia	4,420
18	Chievo	4,335
19	Como	3,739
20	Acireale	3,204
