= ASD Porfido Albiano =

Italian football club

Porfido Albiano
- Full name: Associazione Sportiva Dilettantistica Porfido Albiano
- Nickname(s): Porfido Albiano
- Founded: 1968
- Ground: Stadio Comunale, Albiano, Italy
- Capacity: 499
- Chairman: Fulvio Filippi
- League: Eccellenza Trentino-Alto Adige/Südtirol
- 2008–09: Eccellenza Trentino-Alto Adige/Südtirol, 1st
Home colours	Away colours

A.S.D. Porfido Albiano is an Italian association football club located in Albiano, Trentino-Alto Adige/Südtirol. It currently plays in Serie D. Its colors are red and black.
