= Civitanovese Calcio =

Italian football club

US Civitanovese
- Full name: Unione Sportiva Civitanovese Società Sportiva Dilettantistica s.r.l.
- Founded: 1919; 2002 (refounded); 2015 (refounded)
- Ground: Stadio Comunale, Civitanova Marche, Italy
- Capacity: 6,000
- League: Eccellenza
- 2014–15: Serie D/F, 7th
Home colours	Away colours

U.S. Civitanovese S.S.D. is an Italian association football club, based in Civitanova Marche, Macerata. It played 2 seasons in Serie C1 and 14 in Serie C2. After the 2023-24 Eccellenza, the team was promoted to play in Serie D from 2024-25 season.

== History ==
=== Foundation ===
In 1919 was found Società Sportiva Portocivitanova (in some years will change names to become simply Civitanovese) thanks to the willingness of some citizens, including Gerardo Bella who would later be the first president. The boot is not the most simple: the club doesn't participate consistently in championships- it only plays friendly matches. In 1938 the Fascist regime unified the upper part with the port area, creating the commune of Civitanova Marche. To accommodate the change, they decided to form a team that could adequately represent the new reality. Thanks to the entrepreneur Adriano Cecchetti, the club began playing in minor leagues. In the 1942–1943 season the club was able to play in Serie C, and the first derby against Maceratese was lost by 1–2.

=== Postwar period ===
After the war Civitanovese played two consecutive seasons in Serie C (1946–47 and 1947–48), from then only on years in Regional Promotion where in some seasons indicate fiery derby against Del Duca Ascoli, the Fermo, the Sauro Vis Pesaro and Macerata.

=== Golden years ===
Until the early 80s the team always plays between Serie D and Promozione, with only two seasons in Serie C (1961–62 and '62–'63). In fact in the late '70s was promoted to the newly established Serie C2 and in the 1980–1981 season comes second, behind Padova and in front of Maceratese, and as a result it was promoted to Serie C1 Group B. The year is remembered with great enthusiasm in the city because after twenty years, the team returned to play against bigger clubs: Ternana, Salerno, Taranto, Livorno and others. The 27 points earned are not enough and relegation is inevitable. The following year in Serie C2 is still second, behind the Francavilla, and promoted to Serie C1 where, however, relegated again. These years are also to be remembered for the many friendly and large companies decided to play at the Sports Centre of Civitanova; the most remembered was against Milan. With the leadership headed by Costamagna remains in Serie C2 until the early '90s. In 1993–94 rossoblu relegated from Serie C2 Group B after earning just 26 points.

=== The new millennium ===
The second half of the 90s are characterized by ups and downs between Serie D, Eccellenza and some years in Promozione. With the arrival of the new millennium back from Eccellenza Civitanovese unfortunately wasn't able to give great satisfaction to its audience. (2004–2005, 2006–2007, 2007–2008). Fans at the end of the season '07–'08 asked clearly to society and made it clear that they wanted to see his team get back to playing in the categories best fit to the square. In the 2008–2009 season the club has participated Eccellenza Marche. Started badly, in November the Civitanovese hired Osvaldo Jaconi on the bench and with a great second round wins 2nd place and brings the club to the playoffs. The team even comes to the national play-off final against Selargius, but it lost 0–2 in Sardinia and wasn't successful in the second leg. But, the team would be allowed to play in Serie D due to fill vacancies created. The three successive seasons are very good with the club that beating many teams and reaching the play-off but didn't achieve the promotion. The 2012–2013 season featured the return of the "derby" with Maceratese. Civitanovese played two more seasons in Serie D until it was declared bankrupt by a Macerata court at the end of June 2015, thus it eventually folded.

=== Another refoundation ===
A new club US Civitanovese SSD was founded in June 2015 and entered Eccellenza Marche by acquiring the former club's sporting title.

== Colors and badge ==
The team's colors are red and blue.
