= ASD Cagliese Calcio =

Italian football club

Cagliese
- Full name: Associazione Sportiva Dilettante; Cagliese Calcio
- Nickname: –
- Founded: 1922
- Ground: Stadio Comunale, Cagli, Italy
- Capacity: 4,000
- Chairman: Dante Damiani
- Manager: Maurizio Severini
- League: Serie D/D
- 2006–07: Serie D/F, 6th
Home colours	Away colours

Associazione Sportiva Dilettante Cagliese Calcio is an Italian association football club located in Cagli, Marche. It currently plays in the Italian seventh division after playing in Serie D in the late 2000s. Its colors are yellow and red.

The club was founded in 1920. Umberto Mochi was the first president.
