= ASD Narnese Calcio =

Italian football club

Narnese
- Full name: Associazione Sportiva Dilettantistica Narnese Calcio
- Founded: 1926
- Ground: Stadio San Girolamo, Narni, Italy
- Capacity: 2,649
- Chairman: Moreno Gubbiotti and Paolo Garofoli
- Manager: Otello Trippini
- League: Serie D/E
- 2012–13: Eccellenza Umbria, 1st (promoted)
Home colours	Away colours

Associazione Sportiva Dilettantistica Narnese Calcio is an Italian association football club located in Narni, Umbria.

It currently plays in Serie D.

== Return to Serie D ==
In the 2012–13 season the club won the Eccellenza Umbria and returned to Serie D after six years.

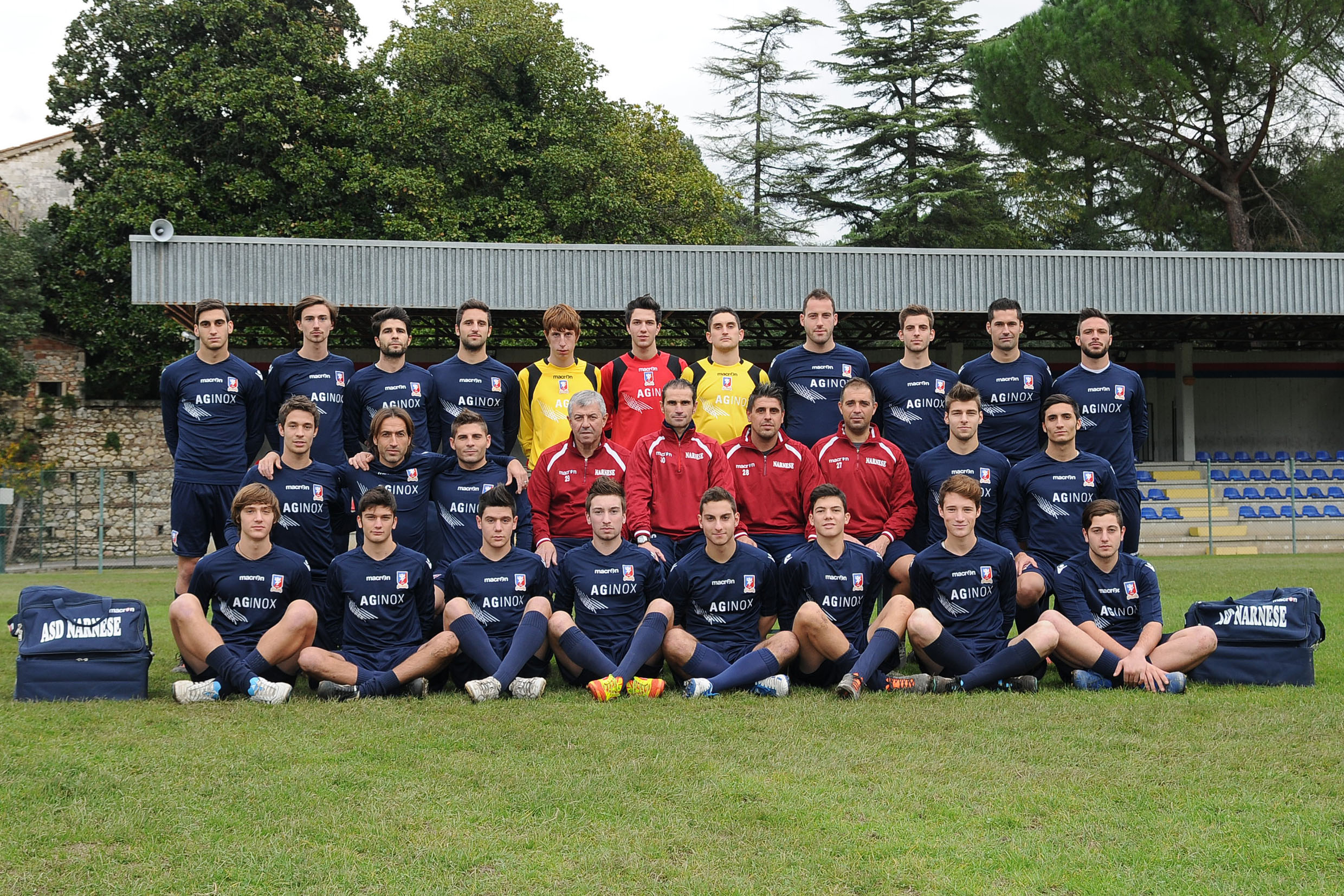
The winning team of the last championship – Eccellenza 2012–13.

== Colours and badge ==
The team's colours are red and blue. Its symbol is a griffin rampant, the same as the crest of the town of Narni.
