= SS Ebolitana 1925 =

Italian football club

Ebolitana
- Full name: Associazione Sportiva Calcio Ebolitana 1925
- Founded: 1925; 2012 (refounded)
- Ground: Massayoli (Stadio José Guimarães Dirceu), Eboli, Italy
- Capacity: 15,000
- Chairman: Gianluigi Carlino
- Manager: Luigi Pezzella
- League: Serie D
- 2017–18: Serie D/I, 15th (relegated after play-off)
Home colours	Away colours

Associazione Sportiva Calcio Ebolitana 1925 (formerly Società Sportiva Ebolitana 1925) is an Italian association football club located in Eboli, Campania. It currently plays in Serie D.

== History ==
The club was founded in 1925, and spent its seasons between Promozione, Eccellenza and Interregionale. He played 12 championships in fifth series, finishing up to seventh (in 1991 and 1999).

In 2004 he moved to the forefront as a company run by fans, as they bought the sports title from the town of Eboli and with the help of its fans managed to register to the championship of Eccellenza. The same year he won the championship, getting the Fair Play Award of Eccellenza by the Board and promoted to Serie D.

The Return is enshrined in Serie D with a new record: in fact, at the end of the championship, earned 51 points, finishing in 8th place. On 27 May 2007 relegated to Eccellenza after only two years in Serie D, after losing the play-out to Lavello.

On 17 February 2010 won Regional Italian Cup by beating Arzanese in the final after penalty kicks (2–2 after extra time). Moreover, the same year, following the 2nd place in the standings behind Battipagliese, Ebolitana gained access to the playoffs. There won against Real Nocera, Isernia and Arzanese, thanks to away goals and promoted to Serie D.

On 8 May 2011 got its first historical promotion to Lega Pro Seconda Divisione, after finishing in first place in Group I with 89 points (with an average of 2.49 per game), beating the last day the second-placed and direct competitor A.S.D. Forza e Coraggio, by winning on the field of the newly promoted Aprilia 3–1. Also, Ebolitana reached the semi-finals of Scudetto Dilettanti, where was defeated by Cuneo on penalties.

In 2011/2012 season the team manages to join, albeit with difficulty, Lega Pro Seconda Divisione. The adventure lasts only one year in the Lega Pro with the inevitable relegation back to Serie D.

In summer 2012 it does not appeal against the exclusion of Covisod from Serie D and so was excluded from all football. Later in the same year it was reformed as ASC Ebolitana 1925, restarting from Prima Categoria Campania, where it finished 10th in Group G for the 2012–13 season. It was admitted the next season to Promozione Campania.

== Colors and badge ==
Its colors were white and blue.

== Players ==
As of 19 November 2026

Note: Flags indicate national team as defined under FIFA eligibility rules; some limited exceptions apply. Players may hold more than one non-FIFA nationality.

No.	Pos.	Nation	Player
1	GK	ITA	Domenico Puca
3	MF	ITA	Andrea Festino
4	MF	ITA	Alessio Esposito
5	DF	ARG	Federico Lonigro
6	DF	ITA	Filippo Nobile
8	MF	CIV	Yacou Diabaté
9	FW	ITA	Bruno Ciprio
10	FW	ARG	Franco Boló
11	FW	ITA	Antonio Messina
12	GK	ITA	Andrea Esposito
16	DF	ITA	Mattia Esposito
17	FW	ITA	Mariano Guarracino
20	DF	ITA	Davide Zugaro
21	MF	ITA	Marco Papa

No.	Pos.	Nation	Player
22	GK	ITA	Francesco Manzo
24	MF	ITA	Mattia Simeone
26	MF	ITA	Fiore Cirillo
27	DF	ITA	Alessandro Mauriello
28	MF	ITA	Marco Somma
29	FW	SEN	Daouda Ndiaye
30	MF	ITA	Simone Bonavita
45	FW	ITA	Luca Paudice
72	DF	ITA	Lorenzo Benevento
77	FW	ITA	Stefano Amato
79	FW	ITA	Martino D'Angelo
88	MF	ITA	Francesco Muscatiello
90	MF	ITA	Andrea Gonnella
–	FW	ITA	Ivanoe Sessa
