= SSD Calcio Città di Castello =

Italian football club

Group Castello
- Full name: Società Sportiva Dilettantistica Group Città di Castello
- Founded: 1998
- Ground: Stadio Comunale "Bernicchi", Città di Castello, Italy
- Capacity: 1,000
- Manager: Simone Pazzaglia
- League: Eccellenza Umbria
- 2011–12: Serie D/E, 17th
| Home colours | Away colours |

Società Sportiva Dilettantistica Group Città di Castello (usually referred to as Group Castello) is an Italian association football club, based in Città di Castello, Umbria. Group Castello currently plays in Eccellenza.

== History ==
The club was founded in 1998.

The club in the season 2011–12 was relegated from Serie D to Eccellenza.

== Squad ==
=== Managers ===
The club is currently coached by Simone Pazzaglia.

== Colors and badge ==
The team's colors are white and red.
