= AC Bastia 1924 =

Italian association football club

Bastia
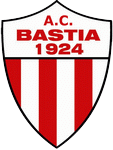
- Full name: Associazione Calcio; Bastia 1924
- Nickname: Biancorossi
- Founded: 1924; 1972 (refounded)
- Ground: Stadio Comunale Carlo Degli Esposti, Bastia Umbra, Italy
- Capacity: 1,500
- Chairman: Sandro Mammoli
- Manager: Francesco Martinelli
- League: Eccellenza Umbria
- 2019–20: Serie D/E, 16th (relegated)
Home colours	Away colours

A.C. Bastia 1924 is an Italian football club based in Bastia Umbra, Umbria. The club played in Eccellenza Umbria.

== History ==
The club was founded in 1924, the first line up was: Bartolucci Antonio; Mencarelli Brasillo, Cingolani Igino; Caldari Fioravanti, Alunni Annibale e Pascolini Alfredo; Petrini Arcangelo, Farello Giovanni, Bucefari Vincenzo, Celori Pronto, Giannotti Gino.

In the early years the team didn't play in an official championship because of lack of money and played only friendlies. In 1935–36 the club played in the campionato unico per dilettanti.

The club played in this championship until 1945. In 1945 Bastia played in Prima Divisione. In 1947–48 the team was promoted to Serie C but the team was forced to renounce to it because of economical problems. In 1948–49 the club played in Prima Divisione, in 1949–50 in seconda divisione. In 1952–53 the club played in Prima Divisione because prima divisione was merged with seconda divisione.

In 1953–54 Bastia played in promozione regionale. After two years in Promozione the team was promoted in 1955–56 to IV Serie (Serie D) after winning the promotion playoff against Gubbio. In the first year in IV Serie the club managed to avoid relegation but at the end of the 1957–58 season the club was relegated to Promozione after losing relegation playoffs against Rotulea and Perugia.

Three seasons later Bastia won the Promozione Umbria championship but renounced to the promotion to Serie D. In the 1962–63 the team arrived 2nd in Promozione and won the Coppa Umbria. The club remained in Promozione until the 1971–72 season. In that season the team was relegated. At the end of the season the club ceased to exist.

A new team, U.S. Bastia, joined the Terza Categoria championship. The new team, after a series of promotions, at the end of the season 1987–88 was promoted to Serie D. The club remained in this championship until 1995, missing promotion in 1989–90 (3rd place). At the end of the 1994–95 season, the club was relegated to Eccellenza Umbria.

In the season 2011–12 the team gained promotion from Eccellenza Umbria after finishing first, to Serie D, but were relegated in 2015. In 2018 they won promotion once again.

== Colors and badge ==
Its colours are white and red.

== Chronology ==
- 1955–56: 1st in Promozione after promotion playoff against Gubbio. Promoted in IV Serie
- 1956–57: 15th in IV Serie
- 1957–58: 12th in IV Serie. Relegated
- 1959–60: 3rd in Promozione
- 1960–61: 1st in Promozione
- 1961–62: 5th in Promozione
- 1962–63: 2nd in Promozione. The club won Coppa Umbria
- 1964–65: 5th in Promozione
- 1966–67: 9th in Promozione
- 1967–68: 13th in Promozione
- 1970–71: 15th in Promozione
- 1971–72: 15th in Promozione. Relegated
- 1988–89: 11th in Campionato Interregionale
- 1989–90: 3rd in Campionato Interregionale
- 1990–91: 5th in Campionato Interregionale
- 1991–92: 8th in Campionato Interregionale
- 1992–93: 14th in C.N.D.
- 1993–94: 14th in C.N.D.
- 1994–95: 18th in C.N.D. Relegated to Eccellenza
- 2006–07: 5th in Eccellenza
- 2007–08: 10th in Eccellenza
- 2008–09: 4th in Eccellenza Lost promotion play-offs
- 2009–10: 5th in Eccellenza Lost promotion play-offs
- 2010–11: 6th in Eccellenza
- 2011–12: 1st in Eccellenza Promoted to Serie D
- 2012–13: 11th in Serie D
- 2013-14: 14th in Group E in Serie D. Won relegation play-offs
- 2014-15: 18th in Group E in Serie D. Relegated to Eccellenza, reached preliminary rounds of Coppa Italia
- 2015-16: 13th in Eccellenza Umbria.
- 2016-17: 7th in Eccellenza Umbria.
- 2017-18: 1st in Eccellenza Umbria. Promoted to Serie D
