= FC Fossombrone =

Italian football club

- Full name: Football Club Fossombrone
- Nicknames: Bianco-azzuri (The White and Blues)
- Founded: 1949
- Ground: Stadio Comunale, Fossombrone, Italy
- Capacity: 1000
- Chairman: Francesco Tramontana
- Manager: Francesco Baldarelli
- League: Serie D
- 2022–23: Serie D/F, 11th
Home colours	Away colours

F.C. Fossombrone (formerly F.C. Bikkembergs Fossombrone) is an Italian association football located in Fossombrone, Marche. The small club was made popular after it was acquired by Belgian fashion designer Dirk Bikkembergs.

== History ==
The club was founded on 16 June 1949 by a group of local sportsmen in the town of Fossombrone as Polisportiva Forsempronese. Since then, the club spent all of its history playing at the amateur level, arriving up to Eccellenza. In 2005, Dirk Bikkembergs decided to acquire the club and started a huge rebranding, also renaming it F.C. Bikkembergs Fossombrone, with the aim to use the team as a laboratory for styling and fabric technology, in order to make all of his designs tested and promoted directly by football players.

In 2006–07 season, under head coach Gabriele Morganti, with former managerial experiences also at professional level, new players were attracted, the club directly decided to target promotion to Serie D. The club reached the regional semi-final in the Coppa Italia Dilettanti, being stopped by Piano San Lazzaro before they might claim a spot for the final, while in the league they missed promotion only by one point of the leader, being defeated in the national playoff finals by Torgiano of Umbria.

The following season did not change that much, as Fossombrone, under a new head coach, ended again in second place, missing promotion for a second consecutive time. However, promotion to Serie D finally arrived in 2008–09, with Fossombrone being crowned Eccellenza Marche winners.

At the end of the 2009-10 Serie D season Bikkember.gs decided to sell the club.

In the season 2010–11, from Serie D group F relegated to Eccellenza Marche, also due to the strong downgrading now by neglect of Bikkembergs.

== Colours and badge ==
Fossombrone always played with blue and white color uniforms with strips since the club was established in 1949. However, since the arrival of Dirk Bikkembergs, kits were completely rebranded in a more original way, with home jerseys being white with blue swirls, while the away is black with a butterfly pattern. Dirk Bikkembergs has also changed the after-game look, discarding the traditional jacket and tie for jeans and tracksuit-like leather jacket. This portrays Fossombrone more as the young team that they are, and Bikkembergs uses the squad to try out his latest designs in sportswear.

== Achievements ==
- Eccellenza:
  - Winners: 2008–2009
  - Runners-up: 2006–2007, 2007–2008
