= SSD Vivi Altotevere Sansepolcro =

Italian football club

Sansepolcro
- Full name: Società Sportiva Dilettantistica Vivi Altotevere Sansepolcro S.r.l.
- Founded: 1921; 1978 (refounded); 2014 (refounded)
- Ground: Stadio Buitoni, Sansepolcro, Italy
- Capacity: 2,000
- Chairman: Giorgio Lacrimini
- Manager: Andrea Bricca
- League: Eccellenza Tuscany
- 2025–26: Serie D/E, 18th (relegated)
Home colours	Away colours

Società Sportiva Dilettantistica Vivi Altotevere Sansepolcro is an Italian association football club located in Sansepolcro, Tuscany. It currently plays in Eccellenza Tuscany.

== History ==
It was founded in 1921 and refounded in 1978 and 2014.

Old Sansepolcro Calcio logo

The Unione Sportiva Sansepolcro, founded in 1921, failed in 1982 after two consecutive championships played in Serie C2. The legacy of the old society is collected by the Gruppo Sportivo Borgo, born in 1978 as a society of pure academy. In 1983, the team entered the championship of the Terza Categoria, which won in the 1984–1985 season, promoting to the Seconda Categoria. In 1985–1986, G.S. Borgo was promoted to the Prima Categoria. In 1987–1988, thanks to the second place in Prima Categoria, the team won promotion to Promozione.

The team achieved promotion to Eccellenza in 1991–1992, while in 1993–1994 was promoted to National Amateur Championship or Serie D. Since then the team has played continuously in Serie D.

On 4 July 2000, the team was renamed Altotevere Calcio, part of a project to create a single company based in Sansepolcro, Citta di Castello and with the achievement of professional categories. For various reasons, after only two seasons Altotevere Calcio returns to the old name Sansepolcro Calcio.

On 20 June 2009, the Sansepolcro won the Scudetto Junior by beating Savona in the final on penalties.

In the 2010–11 Serie D season Sansepolcro gained access to the play-off for promotion in Lega Pro Seconda Divisione but eventually was eliminated.

In the 2016–17 season it plays in Serie D Group G.

== Colours and badge ==
Its colours are white and black.
