= AS Centro del Mobile Calcio =

Italian football club

Centro del Mobile
- Full name: Associazione Sportiva Centro del Mobile Calcio
- Nickname(s): Mobilieri (furniture makers)
- Founded: 1980
- Dissolved: 2007
- Ground: Campo di via del Mas, Brugnera, Italy
- League: no league
- 2006–07: Prima Categoria group A, 16th
Home colours	Away colours

Associazione Sportiva Centro del Mobile Calcio, or simply Centro del Mobile (sometimes Centromobile), was an Italian association football club located in Brugnera, Friuli-Venezia Giulia. In 2007 it was dissolved.

== History ==
In 1980 U.S. Brugnera (1st in Prima Categoria group A, promoted to Promozione) and A.C. Prata (14th in Seconda Categoria group A, relegated by goal difference to Terza Categoria) merge to form A.S. Centro del Mobile Calcio (it will become A.S.D. Centro del Mobile Calcio in 2004 for fiscal reasons), and registered in Promozione FVG 1980–81. The name is chosen by the founders, all entrepreneurs in the furniture factories of the area (in fact "Centro del Mobile" means "center of the furnitures"). Great protagonist of the history of the club is Gian Renzo Benedet, first with US Brugnera, then he is one of the founders of AS Centro del Mobile, of which he becomes a "flag" and which he followed first as a companion, thus assuming the role of vice president and technical director, until the dissolution of the club. Benedet died on 7 May 2014.

The colors of US Brugnera are yellow-blue, while those of AC Prata are white-blue, white and blue are chosen as the colors of the new club.

The greatest result in the history of the club is the second place in Interregionale 1990–91, behind U.S. Giorgione, which makes it almost promotion to Serie C2.

In the 2000s problems arise: on the one hand the enthusiasm, the ambitions, the historical results of S.P. Tamai, on the other a situation that for many continues to be precarious, lived with a thousand difficulties, always on the razor's edge. A.S. Centro del Mobile is the unhappy half of Brugnera football, the team from the municipal capital which, after having reached moments of great sporting satisfaction in the early 90s, the white-blue club is at the bottom of Prima Categoria rankings. Several relegations accumulated in this period, even more numerous are the disappointments for the historic core of the managers, who among a thousand problems - especially of a financial nature - somehow manage to make ends meet and keep the company going. Someone asks: why this difference? Why does Centro del Mobile, a company born from the merger between Prata and Brugnera in 1980 with this name at the behest of the furniture makers, now not find adequate financial support? "In fact - affirms the vice president Gian Renzo Benedet - it is quite incomprehensible. The furniture makers then pushed for the creation of this club and then, gradually, all of them withdrew. There is still a couple of them that gives us a hand, but every year reaching the budget necessary to complete the season is more and more tiring. Perhaps that merger was wrong, perhaps parochialism meant that neither Prata nor Brugnera felt the company their own, so much so that they both continued their own independently perhaps there is not a sufficient passion for football, while in Tamai the whole town gathers around the sports club. Or perhaps the managers are unpleasant. The fact is that, especially after the failure of Dall'Agnese and Mito (two firms), about ten years ago they were the main sponsors of the club, the white-blue association has never recovered ". "I don't think it's a question of sympathy - says the mayor Ermes Moras - the reality of AS Centro del Mobile is completely different from that of Tamai, even though it belongs to the same municipality. They are two associations set up differently. What is undoubtedly true is the love of the people, much greater in the fraction than in the capital, towards the relative football team. In Tamai everyone lends their work voluntarily and this is already an important basis for an amateur club".

In summer 2007 the club is dissolved and, on 3 August 2007, its players are free to look for a new club.

=== Recent seasons ===
Season	League									Cups	
Season	Division	P	W	D	L	F	A	Pts	Pos	Cup	Round
1980–81	Promozione	30	15	8	7	33	16	38	3rd	Coppa Italia Dilettanti	1st round
1981–82	Promozione	30	7	14	9	20	22	28	10th	Coppa Italia Dilettanti	3rd round
1982–83	Promozione	30	10	9	11	33	37	29	8th	Coppa Italia Dilettanti	1st round
1983–84	Promozione	30	7	11	12	22	32	25	14th ↓	Coppa Italia Dilettanti	1st round
1984–85	Prima Categoria, group A								1st ↑	Region Cup	?
1985–86	Promozione	30	7	17	6	26	22	31	8th	Coppa Italia Dilettanti	1st round
1986–87	Promozione	30	4	10	16	11	27	18	16th ↓	Coppa Italia Dilettanti	1st round
1987–88	Prima Categoria, group A								1st ↑	Region Cup	?
1988–89	Promozione	30	14	11	5	35	19	39	2nd ↑	Coppa Italia Dilettanti	3rd round
1989–90	Interregionale, group D	34	12	12	10	25	20	36	7th	Coppa Italia Dilettanti	1st round
1990–91	Interregionale, group E	34	14	15	5	27	21	43	2nd	Coppa Italia Dilettanti	1st round
1991–92	Interregionale, group C	34	7	14	13	25	34	28	12th	Interregionale Cup	?
1992–93	CND, group D	34	4	18	12	31	44	26	15th	C.N.D. Cup	1st round
1993–94	CND, group D	34	6	11	17	25	52	23	17th ↓	C.N.D. Cup	?
1994–95	Eccellenza	30	11	18	1	29	13	40	2nd	FVG Cup	Quarters
1995–96	Eccellenza	30	9	16	5	28	17	43	6th	FVG Cup	1st round
1996–97	Eccellenza	30	7	14	9	23	22	35	11th	FVG Cup	1st round
1997–98	Eccellenza	30	8	7	15	27	42	31	13th	FVG Cup	Quarters
1998–99	Eccellenza	30	6	5	19	23	43	23	15th ↓	FVG Cup	Quarters
1999–00	Promozione, group A	30	9	11	10	31	39	38	7th	FVG Cup	1st round
2000–01	Promozione, group A	30	5	11	14	23	45	26	16th ↓	FVG Cup	1st round
2001–02	Prima Categoria, group A	30	11	9	10	41	35	42	9th	Region Cup	Quarters
2002–03	Prima Categoria, group A	30	12	8	10	42	34	44	10th	Prima Categoria Cup	1st round
2003–04	Prima Categoria, group A	30	11	11	8	37	30	44	6th	Prima Categoria Cup	Eighters
2004–05	Prima Categoria, group A	30	8	9	13	34	38	33	12th	Prima Categoria Cup	Eighters
2005–06	Prima Categoria, group A	30	9	10	11	42	44	38	10th	Prima Categoria Cup	1st round
2006–07	Prima Categoria, group A	30	0	2	28	21	100	2	16th	Prima Categoria Cup	1st round
Source: Messaggero Veneto – Giornale del Friuli

=== Key ===
1st	2nd	↑	↓
Champions	Runners-up	Promoted	Relegated

=== Successor clubs ===
In 1980, reborn U.S. Brugnera as a "società pura", that is, of only the youth sector. In 2010 it enrolled in Terza Categoria, but in the summer of 2019 it does not enroll in the Seconda Categoria 2019–20 season and ceases to operate.

The dawn of the history of Prata dates back to 1965 when Peressine and Prata di Sopra agreed on a union, giving life to Audace San Simone. From an idea of Bastian Corazza and Mimmo Valvasori, a team of young players sprang up in Prata, with Olivo Zoppè as president and Piero Puiatti as secretary, helped by many other protagonists who were then lost in the memory of the A.C. Prata in the merger and transformation into Centro del Mobile.
In 1987 Prata resurrected thanks to four friends: Ezio Maccan (player, elected president), Luigi Giacomin, Ennio Prissinotti and Aldo Piccinin, who also involved Giannino Zannese in the project, who later became secretary and then president, Flavio Barzan and Maurizio Zamuner. The club started from Terza Categoria. After some good seasons, preceded by retreats in Piancavallo, in 1989–90 the team flew to Seconda Categoria and the following year it touched another promotion. The jump to Prima Categoria came in 1993, following the second place in the league and the victory over Lavarianese in the play-off at Codroipo. After a few seasons, Prata experienced the first relegation of its new history in 1995–96, and in 2000 it returned to Terza Categoria. Under the presidency of Giannino Zannese the team moved up to Seconda Categoria and in 2004, with Giorgio Pighetti as president, returned to Prima Categoria. In 2006 Ezio Maccan returned as president and Prata went to Promozione. In 2009 the club merged with Tiezzese and Calcio Prata was born.
On the evening of 18 June 2015 with the merger with G.S. Falchi Vis Pas was born A.S.D. Prata Falchi Visinale, based in Visinale and playing field in Prata di Pordenone.

== Honours ==
- Interregionale

Runners-up: 1990–91

- Promozione FVG (1st regional level until 1991)

Runners-up: 1988–89

- Prima Categoria FVG (2nd regional level until 1991)

Winners: 1984–85, 1987–88

== Colors and badge ==
AS Centro del Mobile Calcio colors were white and blue.
