= 1992–93 Eccellenza Friuli-Venezia Giulia =

Eccellenza F.V.G.
- Season: 1992–93
- Champions: Pro Gorizia; 1st title
- Relegated: San Giovanni; Monfalcone; Serenissima
- Top goalscorer: Bruno Bortolin – Tamai (16)

1992–93 Eccellenza Friuli-Venezia Giulia was the 6th level of Italian football, and it was the highest one in this region.

This is the 1st season of Eccellenza, 16 clubs took part in:

- 12 clubs come from Eccellenza 1991–92
- 2 clubs were relegated from Interregionale 1991–92
- 2 clubs were promoted from Prima Categoria Friuli-Venezia Giulia 1991–92.

== Teams ==
Province	Team	City/Town
Province of Pordenone	S.S. Fontanafredda	Fontanafredda
Province of Pordenone	U.S. Porcia	Porcia
Province of Pordenone	S.S. Sacilese	Sacile
Province of Pordenone	S.P. Tamai	Tamai
Province of Udine	A.S. Cussignacco	Udine
Province of Udine	A.C. Gemonese	Gemona del Friuli
Province of Udine	A.C. San Daniele	San Daniele del Friuli
Province of Udine	U.S. Serenissima	Pradamano
Province of Gorizia	U.S. Gradese	Grado
Province of Gorizia	U.S. Itala San Marco	Gradisca d'Isonzo
Province of Gorizia	A.C. Monfalcone	Monfalcone
Province of Gorizia	A.S. Pro Gorizia	Gorizia
Province of Gorizia	A.S. Ronchi	Ronchi dei Legionari
Province of Gorizia	A.S. San Canzian	San Canzian d'Isonzo
Province of Trieste	S.S. San Giovanni	Trieste
Province of Trieste	Pol. San Sergio	Trieste

== Final table ==
Pos.	Squadra	Pts	P	W	D	L	GF	GA	Df
1.	Pro Gorizia (R)	50	30	22	6	2	49	12	+37
2.	Tamai	43	30	16	11	3	49	24	+25
3.	Ronchi	39	30	15	9	6	43	22	+21
4.	Fontanafredda	36	30	13	10	7	39	21	+18
5.	Gradese	35	30	11	13	6	37	21	+16
6.	Porcia	35	30	13	9	8	36	28	+8
7.	Gemonese	31	30	9	13	8	24	28	-4
8.	Sacilese	31	30	8	15	7	31	31	0
9.	Cussignacco	28	30	7	14	9	23	27	-4
10.	San Daniele	28	30	7	14	9	30	28	+2
11.	Itala San Marco	28	30	10	8	12	26	31	-5
12.	San Sergio (P)	27	30	9	9	12	25	33	-8
13.	San Canzian (P)	23	30	6	11	13	23	30	-7
14.	San Giovanni	21	30	6	9	15	29	48	-19
15.	Monfalcone (R)	15	30	3	9	18	20	56	-36
16.	Serenissima	10	30	2	6	22	15	57	-42

: domestic cup winners

== See also ==
- Eccellenza Friuli Venezia Giulia
