= AC Palmanova =

Italian football club

Palmanova
- Full name: Associazione Calcio Palmanova
- Nickname: Amaranto (amaranth)
- Founded: 1909
- Dissolved: 2010
- Ground: Stadio Dino Bruseschi, Palmanova, Italy
- Capacity: 1,000
- 2000–01: Serie D/C, 17th (relegated)
Home colours	Away colours

Associazione Calcio Palmanova, or simply Palmanova, was an Italian association football club located in Palmanova, Friuli-Venezia Giulia. In 2010 it was dissolved and since then it has been carrying out only youth activities.

== History ==
It participated in Serie C seasons in the 30s (1934–35 Prima Divisione) and in the 40s and reaching the top in 1946–47 Serie C where, with Renzo Burini (who later moved to A.C. Milan), it reached the 3rd place.

Gradually falling from category, the Amaranto team ("Amaranth", so called by the fans for their social colors) reached the lowest point in its history, risking relegation to Terza Categoria (the lowest in Italy) at the end of the 1973–74 season.

During the summer of that year, commander Dino Bruseschi, chairman of Udinese in the 1950s and 1960s, born in Palmanova and mayor of the town at the time, was convinced by his friends to take over the team's fate.

In the new sports center just inaugurated, AC Palmanova won the Seconda Categoria in 1974–75 and the Prima Categoria in 1975–76. In the 1976–77 season, after a heated fight against C.M.M. San Michele gave way in the direct match (with two counterattack goals from Botta and Di Blas) and had to settle for second place. In the following 1977–78 season, after the change of coach (Fulvio Zonch in place of Franco Sclauzero) a comeback began (27 points out of 30 in the second half of season) ending with a play-off against Pro Gorizia played at the Stadio Friuli of Udine in front of 6,000 spectators and finished 1–1 after extra time; the draw favored the Amaranto team that entered into the Serie D. The following year, in the division (at that time semi-professional category) AC Palmanova for three quarters of the season could think of a further jump to Serie C2 but collapsed in the last few days.

In the following years, AC Palmanova alternates seasons in Serie D (1978–79, 1979–80, 1991–92, 1992–93, 1995–96, 1996–97, 2000–01) with relegations to Eccellenza and to Promozione until the 2008–09 season, when it was relegated first to Promozione and the following year to Prima Categoria. In 2009–10, the centenary year, the club is now not only without funds and also in debt.

There are several managers who take turns at the "bedside" of the club but no one can do anything to save it. The inevitable failure occurs at the end of the season.

The club changes its name to A.S.D. Palma Calcio and takes care of the pure youth activity waiting to recreate a team to be registered in Terza Categoria.

=== Recent seasons ===
Season	League									Cups	
Season	Division	P	W	D	L	F	A	Pts	Pos	Cup	Round
1954–55	Promozione, group A	30	9	10	11	47	53	28	8th	No cups	
1955–56	Promozione, group A	30	5	7	18	28	59	17	15th ↓	No cups	
1956–57	Prima Divisione, group B									No cups	
1957–59	Youth activity only									No cups	
1959–60	Seconda Categoria, group B	24						11	14th	No cups	
1960–61	Seconda Categoria, group B	23	10	3	10	41	44	23	8th	No cups	
1961–62	Seconda Categoria, group D									No cups	
1962–63	Seconda Categoria, group B									No cups	
1963–64	Seconda Categoria, group E								1st ↑	No cups	
1964–65	Prima Categoria, group B	30	14	8	8	30	23	36	2nd	No cups	
1965–66	Prima Categoria, group B	30	10	9	11	34	35	29	10th	No cups	
1966–67	Prima Categoria, group B	30	13	7	10	25	24	33	5th	Coppa Italia Dilettanti	Not allowed
1967–68	Prima Categoria, group B	30	11	14	5	35	29	36	4th	Coppa Italia Dilettanti	Not allowed
1968–69	Prima Categoria, group B	30	8	11	11	31	44	27	11th ↓	Coppa Italia Dilettanti	Not allowed
1969–70	Prima Categoria, group B								5th	Coppa Italia Dilettanti	1st round
1970–71	Prima Categoria, group B								11th	Coppa Italia Dilettanti	Not allowed
1971–72	Prima Categoria, group B								10th	Coppa Italia Dilettanti	Not allowed
1972–73	Prima Categoria, group B								15th ↓	Coppa Italia Dilettanti	Not allowed
1973–74	Seconda Categoria, group C								12th	Coppa Italia Dilettanti	Not allowed
1974–75	Seconda Categoria, group C								1st ↑	Coppa Italia Dilettanti	Not allowed
1975–76	Prima Categoria, group A								1st ↑	Coppa Italia Dilettanti	Not allowed
1976–77	Promozione	30	14	12	4	37	15	40	2nd	Coppa Italia Dilettanti	Not allowed
1977–78	Promozione	30	16	10	4	46	22	42	1st ↑	Coppa Italia Dilettanti	3rd round
1978–79	Serie D, group B	34	14	10	10	29	25	38	7th	No cups	
1979–80	Serie D, group B	34	6	13	15	20	32	25	18th ↓	No cups	
1980–81	Promozione	30	6	10	14	25	39	22	15th ↓	Coppa Italia Dilettanti	Not allowed
1981–82	Prima Categoria, group B								6th	Region Cup	?
1982–83	Prima Categoria, group B								10th	Region Cup	?
1983–84	Prima Categoria, group B								8th	Region Cup	?
1984–85	Prima Categoria, group B								5th	Region Cup	?
1985–86	Prima Categoria, group B								6th	Region Cup	?
1986–87	Prima Categoria, group B								12th	Region Cup	?
1987–88	Prima Categoria, group B								3rd	Region Cup	?
1988–89	Prima Categoria, group B								1st ↑	Region Cup	Winners
1989–90	Promozione	30	12	13	5	30	17	37	2nd	Coppa Italia Dilettanti	1st round
1990–91	Promozione	30	16	12	2	35	17	44	1st ↑	Coppa Italia Dilettanti	4th round
1991–92	Interregionale, group C	34	7	18	9	27	33	32	10th	Interregionale Cup	?
1992–93	CND, group D	34	4	8	22	22	66	16	18th ↓	C.N.D. Cup	?
1993–94	Eccellenza	30	16	6	8	34	19	38	3rd	FVG Cup	Eighters
1994–95	Eccellenza	30	16	9	5	31	11	41	1st ↑	FVG Cup	Eighters
1995–96	CND, group D	34	9	15	10	28	29	42	10th	C.N.D. Cup	1st round
1996–97	CND, group D	34	1	13	20	11	42	38	18th ↓	C.N.D. Cup	1st round
1997–98	Eccellenza	30	6	11	13	17	27	29	14th ↓	FVG Cup	2nd round
1998–99	Promozione, group B	30	22	7	1	62	22	73	1st ↑	FVG Cup	Quarters
1999–00	Eccellenza	30	18	10	2	42	12	64	2nd ↑	FVG Cup	Runners-up
2000–01	Serie D, group C	34	8	8	18	29	45	32	17th ↓	Serie D Cup	1st round
2001–02	Eccellenza	30	16	8	6	50	30	56	3rd	FVG Cup	2nd round
2002–03	Eccellenza	30	12	6	12	44	40	42	7th	Eccellenza Cup	Quarters
2003–04	Eccellenza	32	10	10	12	45	51	40	8th	FVG Cup	1st round
2004–05	Eccellenza	30	14	6	10	40	30	48	5th	FVG Cup	Semifinals
2005–06	Eccellenza	30	13	9	8	41	37	48	3rd	FVG Cup	Semifinals
2006–07	Eccellenza	30	9	12	9	33	38	36	7th	FVG Cup	Quarters
2007–08	Eccellenza	30	9	7	14	39	46	34	12th	FVG Cup	Quarters
2008–09	Eccellenza	30	8	7	15	26	39	31	14th ↓	FVG Cup	1st round
2009–10	Promozione, group A	30	3	8	19	10	36	16	16th ↓	FVG Cup	1st round
Source: Messaggero Veneto – Giornale del Friuli

=== Key ===
1st	2nd	↑	↓
Champions	Runners-up	Promoted	Relegated

== Honours ==
- Eccellenza Friuli-Venezia Giulia (1st regional level)

Winners: 1977–78, 1990–91, 1994–95

- Promozione Friuli-Venezia Giulia (2nd regional level)

Winners: 1963–64, 1975–76, 1988–89, 1998–99

- Prima Categoria Friuli-Venezia Giulia (3rd regional level)

Winners: 1974–75

- Seconda Categoria Friuli-Venezia Giulia (4th regional level)

Winners: 2010–11

- Coppa Italia Dilettanti Friuli-Venezia Giulia

Runners-up: 1999–00

- Coppa Regione Friuli-Venezia Giulia (Region Cup)

Winners: 1989

== Colors and badge ==
AC Palmanova color was amaranth.
