= ACD Cormonese =

Italian football club

Cormonese
- Full name: Associazione Calcistica Dilettante Cormonese
- Nicknames: Grigiorossi (grey & red)
- Founded: 1922
- Ground: Stadio Comunale Atleti Azzurri, Cormons, Italy
- Capacity: 3,000
- Chairman: Marco Skocaj
- Manager: Livio Lupidi
- League: Seconda Categoria
- 1997–98: Campionato Nazionale Dilettanti/D, 16th (relegated)
- Website: https://www.cormonese.it/
Home colours	Away colours

Associazione Calcistica Dilettante Cormonese, or simply Cormonese, is an Italian association football club located in Cormons, Friuli-Venezia Giulia. It currently plays in Seconda Categoria Friuli Venezia Giulia.

== History ==
The Cormonese was founded in 1922. In 1943–44, with Central and Northern Italy occupied by the Nazis and the constitution of the Italian Social Republic (puppet state of Nazi Germany), Cormonese entered in the mixed National Division championship, in which found far more noble groups of his own region (Venezia Giulia) such as Triestina, Pro Gorizia, Ampelea, Udinese and Ponziana. Surprisingly he won the first three games (played against Monfalconese, Ponziana and San Giusto), even flying to the top of the Julian group, but subsequently collapsed, taking only one victory in the rest of the championship in front of 10 defeats, closing penultimate in front of Ponziana alone.

With the end of the war, Cormonese was admitted to the Serie C Alta Italia managed by the Lega Nazionale Alta Italia. In the 1945–46 season the team came close to promotion to Serie B: it clearly won Group A in front of Ponziana and Ampelea; Group A of the semifinals closed in second place (a group of three teams with Mestrina and Legnago) missing for two points the access to the final promotion. In the following two years, in which he played in the Northern Serie C managed by the Lega Interregionale Nord, the team was unable to maintain itself at high levels. Due to the notable reduction of Serie C clubs (from 18 to just 3 groups, then increased to 4), fifth place in Group F of the Northern Serie C 1947–48 was not enough to guarantee access to the National Serie C, and Cormonese was downgraded to the newly established interregional promotion league managed by the Northern Interregional League. In the 1948–49 season Cormonese closed Group F of Promozione Nord in last place, relegating to the regional league.

In the 1969–70 season he won promotion to Serie D on the field but gave up. Cormonese returned to play in a national division only in the 1996–97 and 1997–98 seasons in which she played in C.N.D. before relegating again to Eccellenza. At the end of the 2001–02 season, Cormonese, in economic difficulties, renounced enrollment in Eccellenza and retreated to Promozione. The same economic difficulties led to bankruptcy at the end of the following season. Meanwhile, in 2001 A.S.D. Calcio Cormòns had been founded which in 2003 enrolled in Terza Categoria and on 1 July 2009 took the name of A.C.D. Cormonese. The re-founded Cormonese returned to Promozione in the 2014–15 season, however relegating after only one season.

=== Recent seasons ===
Season	League									Cups	
Season	Division	P	W	D	L	F	A	Pts	Pos	Cup	Round
1954–55	Promozione, group A	30	9	10	11	29	28	28	8th	No cups	
1955–56	Promozione, group B	30	12	8	10	34	36	32	6th	No cups	
1956–57	Promozione, group A	30	12	5	13	47	44	29	12th	No cups	
1957–58	Campionato Dilettanti, group B	33	13	11	9	43	35	37	8th	No cups	
1958–59	Campionato Dilettanti, group A	34	15	13	6	57	45	43	3rd	No cups	
1959–60	Prima Categoria, group C	26	12	7	7	34	21	31	3rd	No cups	
1960–61	Prima Categoria, group C	28	6	4	18	15	40	18	13th ↓	No cups	
1961–62	Seconda Categoria, group E	26	16	6	4	59	21	37	5th	No cups	
1962–63	Seconda Categoria, group E	26	16	8	2	52	19	40	1st ↑	No cups	
1963–64	Prima Categoria, group A	30	8	9	13	20	32	25	12th	No cups	
1964–65	Prima Categoria, group B	30	5	10	15	18	37	20	16th ↓	No cups	
1965–66	Seconda Categoria, group C	25	6	7	12	21	37	19	13th	No cups	
1966–67	Seconda Categoria, group C	26	18	8	0	45	10	44	1st ↑	Coppa Italia Dilettanti	Not allowed
1967–68	Prima Categoria, group A	30	7	13	10	21	29	27	11th	Coppa Italia Dilettanti	Not allowed
1968–69	Prima Categoria, group A	30	15	11	4	41	17	41	2nd	Coppa Italia Dilettanti	Not allowed
1969–70	Promozione	30	12	12	6	39	19	36	1st	Coppa Italia Dilettanti	3rd round
1970–71	Promozione	30	9	15	6	30	24	33	4th	Coppa Italia Dilettanti	2nd round
1971–72	Promozione	30	12	8	10	33	29	32	5th	Coppa Italia Dilettanti	Not allowed
1972–73	Promozione	30	7	12	11	19	27	26	12th	Coppa Italia Dilettanti	3rd round
1973–74	Promozione	30	7	12	11	23	34	26	12th	Coppa Italia Dilettanti	Not allowed
1974–75	Promozione	30	8	11	11	22	27	27	9th	Coppa Italia Dilettanti	Not allowed
1975–76	Promozione	30	9	8	13	33	34	26	11th	Coppa Italia Dilettanti	2nd round
1976–77	Promozione	30	9	9	12	29	35	27	8th	Coppa Italia Dilettanti	Not allowed
1977–78	Promozione	30	15	5	10	46	22	35	5th	Coppa Italia Dilettanti	1st round
1978–79	Promozione	30	8	8	14	26	32	24	14th ↓	Coppa Italia Dilettanti	4th round
1979–80										Coppa Italia Dilettanti	Not allowed
1980–81	Prima Categoria, group B								2nd ↑	Coppa Italia Dilettanti	Not allowed
1981–82	Promozione	30	9	9	12	29	41	27	11th	Coppa Italia Dilettanti	3rd round
1982–83	Promozione	30	4	20	6	20	27	28	10th	Coppa Italia Dilettanti	1st round
1983–84	Promozione	30	7	13	10	25	30	27	10th	Coppa Italia Dilettanti	2nd round
1984–85	Promozione	30	11	12	7	21	17	34	4th	Coppa Italia Dilettanti	1st round
1985–86	Promozione	30	10	13	7	24	22	33	5th	Coppa Italia Dilettanti	2nd round
1986–87	Promozione	30	7	17	6	26	20	31	9th	Coppa Italia Dilettanti	2nd round
1987–88	Promozione	30	11	13	6	35	26	35	4th	Coppa Italia Dilettanti	1st round
1988–89	Promozione	30	10	9	11	33	28	31	7th	Coppa Italia Dilettanti	2nd round
1989–90	Promozione	30	8	12	10	19	25	28	12th	Coppa Italia Dilettanti	1st round
1990–91	Promozione	30	11	10	9	34	27	32	8th	Coppa Italia Dilettanti	3rd round
1991–92	Eccellenza	30	7	11	12	24	31	25	14th ↓	FVG Cup	2nd round
1992–93	Promozione, group B	30	9	13	8	28	23	31	4th	FVG Cup	1st round
1993–94	Promozione, group B	30	16	12	2	60	21	44	1st ↑	FVG Cup	1st round
1994–95	Eccellenza	30	11	11	8	34	24	33	4th	FVG Cup	Quarters
1995–96	Eccellenza	30	18	11	1	51	16	61	1st ↑	FVG Cup	Quarters
1996–97	CND, group D	34	8	14	12	31	43	38	14th	C.N.D. Cup	2nd round
1997–98	CND, group D	34	9	9	16	31	55	36	16th ↓	C.N.D. Cup	1st round
1998–99	Eccellenza	30	12	5	13	29	24	41	8th	FVG Cup	Runners-up
1999–00	Eccellenza	30	9	8	13	29	41	35	12th	FVG Cup	2nd round
2000–01	Eccellenza	30	11	8	11	25	25	40	9th	FVG Cup	1st round
2001–02	Eccellenza	30	11	10	9	27	23	43	7th ↓	FVG Cup	Semifinals
2002–03	Promozione, group B	30	9	6	15	21	35	33	12th ↓	Promozione Cup	1st round
2003–04	Terza Categoria, group E	24	10	8	6	27	22	38	5th	Terza Categoria Cup	2nd round
2004–05	Terza Categoria, group E	22	14	4	4	36	9	46	2nd	Terza Categoria Cup	1st round
2005–06	Terza Categoria, group D	26	14	5	7	42	22	47	5th	Terza Categoria Cup	1st round
2006–07	Terza Categoria, group D	26	10	6	10	40	37	36	8th	Terza Categoria Cup	Runners-up
2007–08	Terza Categoria, group C	30	16	8	6	58	28	56	3rd	Terza Categoria Cup	Winners
2008–09	Terza Categoria, group C	30	21	7	2	85	21	70	2nd ↑	Terza Categoria Cup	1st round
2009–10	Seconda Categoria, group D	30	8	8	14	36	45	32	13th	Seconda Categoria Cup	1st round
2010–11	Seconda Categoria, group D	30	16	11	3	50	29	59	1st ↑	Seconda Categoria Cup	1st round
2011–12	Terza Categoria, group C	30	18	9	3	51	23	63	3rd	Prima Categoria Cup	1st round
2012–13	Prima Categoria, group B	30	15	6	9	43	26	51	4th	Prima Categoria Cup	1st round
2013–14	Prima Categoria, group C	30	17	10	3	49	24	61	1st ↑	Prima Categoria Cup	Quarters
2014–15	Promozione, group B	30	5	6	19	20	41	21	16th ↓	Promozione Cup	1st round
2015–16	Prima Categoria, group C	30	12	9	9	43	33	45	5th	Prima Categoria Cup	Semifinals
2016–17	Prima Categoria, group C	30	8	8	14	31	50	32	13th ↓	Prima Categoria Cup	Quarters
2017–18	Seconda Categoria, group D	30	12	12	6	63	33	48	6th	Seconda Categoria Cup	Semifinals
2018–19	Seconda Categoria, group D	30	16	8	6	63	31	56	5th	Seconda Categoria Cup	Runners-up
2019–20	Seconda Categoria, group D	22	13	4	5	62	17	43	4th	Seconda Categoria Cup	Interrupted
2020–21	Seconda Categoria, group C	5	5	0	0	20	3	15		Seconda Categoria Cup	Interrupted
Source: Messaggero Veneto – Giornale del Friuli

=== Key ===
1st	2nd	↑	↓
Champions	Runners-up	Promoted	Relegated

== Honours ==
- Eccellenza Friuli-Venezia Giulia (1st regional level)

Winners: 1969–70, 1995–96

- Promozione Friuli-Venezia Giulia (2nd regional level)

Winners: 1962–63, 1966–67, 1993–94

- Prima Categoria Friuli-Venezia Giulia (3rd regional level)

Winners: 2013–14

- Seconda Categoria Friuli-Venezia Giulia (4th regional level)

Winners: 2010–11

- Coppa Italia Dilettanti Friuli-Venezia Giulia

Runners-up: 1998–99

- Supercup Friuli-Venezia Giulia

Runners-up: 1999

== Stadium ==
The football field was built in the 1980s and is part of the Cormons sports center complex. After several years of struggles, the Municipality finally decides to build the new facility with an adjoining training ground. The construction phases are long and bureaucratic, until on 3 December 1986, thanks to the interest of Colonel Luigi Goretti, a friendly match between AS Cormonese and the Italy military national football team was played in Cormons, to inaugurate the playing field (at the time still without stands).
Among the Azzurri players, coached by Francesco Rocca, great A.S. Roma defender, there were many Serie A players, including Luca Pellegrini and Ivano Bonetti (U.C. Sampdoria), Alberico Evani (A.C. Milan), Massimo Mauro (F.C. Juventus), Massimo Susic, originally from Mossa (Udinese Calcio), Massimo Brambati (A.S. Bari), Ciro Ferrara (S.S.C. Napoli), Aladino Valoti (Atalanta B.C.), Enrico Cucchi (Inter) and Mario Bortolazzi (Hellas Verona F.C.). In the ranks of the local club, the Cormonese player Sergio Marcon, who played 21 professional seasons in Serie A, B and C. After that game, which had considerable resonance, the Municipality decided to go ahead with the work of construction of the current stands. The club "Cormonese Calcio" started using the facility from the 1989–90 season.
The playing field was named after the national team player, who wore the local jersey, Germano Mian.

After the 2017 renovation, worth 176,000 euros, the stadium was renamed Stadio Atleti Azzurri.

== Colors and badge ==
ACD Cormonese colors were grey and red.
