= ASD Cordenons Calcio =

Italian football club

Cordenons
- Full name: Associazione Sportiva Dilettantistica Cordenons
- Nickname: Granata (garnet)
- Founded: 1957
- Ground: Stadio Comunale Assi, Cordenons, Italy
- Chairman: Alberto De Anna
- League: Prima Categoria
- 2024–25: Prima Categoria
Home colours	Away colours

Associazione Sportiva Dilettantistica Cordenons, or simply Cordenons, is an Italian association football club located in Cordenons, Friuli-Venezia Giulia. It currently plays in Seconda Categoria Friuli-Venezia Giulia.

In 2020 it merged with S.S. 3S Cordenons to form A.C. Cordenonese 3S.

== History ==
The club was founded in 1957 as AC Cordenonese and, with this name, it often plays in the highest regional division of Friuli (Prima Categoria from 1959 to 1969, Promozione from 1969 to 1991). In the 1970s, the youth sector was founded and excelled at the regional level, also winning second place in the 1980–81 Juniores (under 18 years old) Italian championship.
In the summer of 1994 it merged with fellow citizens of SS Tre S and became USC Cordenons. After years characterized by an almost continuous participation in Promozione league (since 1991 it is the second regional series), in the 2005–06 season it goes down to Seconda Categoria. Under the leadership of president Nadio Polotto, the long-awaited climb arrives. In 2007–08, as ASD Cordenons, it won the Seconda Categoria league, in 2008–09 it won the Prima Categoria play-off and was promoted to Promozione. The following seasons saw the garnet team in the top positions of Promozione, until the 2013–14 season, in which they won the play-offs, thus gaining access to Eccellenza.

In 2016 it won Eccellenza league one match-day early and was promoted to Serie D for the first time. But the adventure in Serie D lasts only one season: the 1–0 defeat in the play-out against Tamai condemns the garnet to relegation. In June 2019, in full financial crisis, the club did not register for the 2019-20 Eccellenza season and the team was dissolved. Immediately after, AC Cordenonese was created, which was not enrolled in any league, but which dedicated itself only to the youth sector.

In Cordenons there is also another club: S.S. Tre S, known as 3S Cordenons. The 3 "S" of the name mean "Società Sportiva Sclavons" (Sclavons is a district of Cordenons). The team was founded in 1962, its colors were the green and orange, and has always played in the minor leagues.

In June 2020 the merger between these two teams is made (after the first merger in 1994, 3S was recreated): AC Cordenonese puts the youth sector while SS 3S Cordenons the first team that plays in Seconda Categoria. Thus was born AC Cordenonese 3S, the playing field is the Stadio Assi (home of Cordenonese), while the training one is the Campo di via Ponte del Vado (home of 3S).

=== Recent seasons ===
Season	League									Cups	
Season	Division	P	W	D	L	F	A	Pts	Pos	Cup	Round
1964–65	Seconda Categoria, group B								1st ↑	No cups	
1965–66	Prima Categoria, group A	30	8	9	13	34	35	25	11th	No cups	
1966–67	Prima Categoria, group A	30	15	4	11	41	38	34	7th	Coppa Italia Dilettanti	Not allowed
1967–68	Prima Categoria, group A	30	9	9	12	38	45	27	11th	Coppa Italia Dilettanti	1st round
1968–69	Prima Categoria, group A	30	9	8	13	30	33	26	12th ↓	Coppa Italia Dilettanti	Not allowed
1969–70										Coppa Italia Dilettanti	Not allowed
1970–71										Coppa Italia Dilettanti	Not allowed
1971–72										Coppa Italia Dilettanti	Not allowed
1972–73	Prima Categoria, group A								2nd ↑	Coppa Italia Dilettanti	Not allowed
1973–74	Promozione	30	11	8	11	32	27	30	8th	Coppa Italia Dilettanti	3rd round
1974–75	Promozione	30	8	8	14	29	36	24	13th	Coppa Italia Dilettanti	1st round
1975–76	Promozione	30	8	11	11	24	28	27	10th	Coppa Italia Dilettanti	Not allowed
1976–77	Promozione	30	7	9	14	25	40	23	15th ↓	Coppa Italia Dilettanti	Not allowed
1977–78	Prima Categoria, group A									Coppa Italia Dilettanti	Not allowed
1978–79	Prima Categoria, group A									Coppa Italia Dilettanti	1st round
1979–80	Prima Categoria, group A									Coppa Italia Dilettanti	Not allowed
1980–81	Prima Categoria, group A								2nd ↑	Coppa Italia Dilettanti	Not allowed
1981–82	Promozione	30	14	12	4	40	19	40	3rd	Coppa Italia Dilettanti	2nd round
1982–83	Promozione	30	10	11	9	35	32	31	6th	Coppa Italia Dilettanti	2nd round
1983–84	Promozione	30	7	12	11	16	23	26	13th	Coppa Italia Dilettanti	3rd round
1984–85	Promozione	30	7	13	10	29	30	27	11th	Coppa Italia Dilettanti	1st round
1985–86	Promozione	30	10	15	5	25	20	35	4th	Coppa Italia Dilettanti	1st round
1986–87	Promozione	30	4	15	11	10	23	23	13th	Coppa Italia Dilettanti	2nd round
1987–88	Promozione	30	7	16	7	23	29	30	8th	Coppa Italia Dilettanti	Not allowed
1988–89	Promozione	30	3	10	17	16	35	16	16th ↓	Coppa Italia Dilettanti	1st round
1989–90										Coppa Italia Dilettanti	Not allowed
1990–91	Prima Categoria, group B								9th	Coppa Italia Dilettanti	Not allowed
1991–92	Promozione, group A	30	8	11	11	24	27	27	11th	FVG Cup	1st round
1992–93	Promozione, group A	30	9	14	7	30	26	32	7th	FVG Cup	1st round
1993–94	Promozione, group A	30	10	13	7	33	25	33	5th	FVG Cup	1st round
1994–95	Promozione, group A	30	12	8	10	36	38	32	5th	FVG Cup	1st round
1995–96	Promozione, group A	30	8	12	10	34	33	36	11th	FVG Cup	1st round
1996–97	Promozione, group A	30	8	11	11	35	45	35	13th	FVG Cup	1st round
1997–98	Promozione, group A	30	8	10	12	35	50	34	13th	FVG Cup	1st round
1998–99	Promozione, group A	30	3	13	14	22	40	22	16th ↓	FVG Cup	3rd round
1999–00	Prima Categoria, group A	30	10	13	7	31	25	43	7th	Region Cup	?
2000–01	Prima Categoria, group A								↓	Region Cup	?
2001–02	Seconda Categoria, group A	30	20	6	4	61	28	66	1st ↑	Region Cup	?
2002–03	Prima Categoria, group A	30	13	8	9	49	37	47	6th	Prima Categoria Cup	1st round
2003–04	Prima Categoria, group A	30	9	7	14	26	44	34	11th	Prima Categoria Cup	1st round
2004–05	Prima Categoria, group A	30	7	11	12	29	36	32	13th	Prima Categoria Cup	1st round
2005–06	Prima Categoria, group A	30	6	9	15	22	42	27	16th ↓	Prima Categoria Cup	1st round
2006–07	Seconda Categoria, group A	30	14	9	7	51	30	52	5th	Seconda Categoria Cup	1st round
2007–08	Seconda Categoria, group A	30	18	7	5	53	33	61	1st ↑	Seconda Categoria Cup	2nd round
2008–09	Prima Categoria, group A	30	19	7	4	61	26	64	2nd ↑	Prima Categoria Cup	Runners-up
2009–10	Promozione, group A	30	14	9	7	50	37	51	3rd	FVG Cup	1st round
2010–11	Promozione, group A	30	12	9	9	45	34	45	7th	FVG Cup	1st round
2011–12	Promozione, group A	30	11	8	11	43	31	41	9th	FVG Cup	1st round
2012–13	Promozione, group A	30	18	5	7	69	35	59	3rd	FVG Cup	Quarters
2013–14	Promozione, group A	30	19	7	4	59	32	64	2nd ↑	Promozione Cup	1st round
2014–15	Eccellenza	30	15	8	7	41	26	53	4th	FVG Cup	Semifinals
2015–16	Eccellenza	30	18	6	6	45	26	60	1st ↑	FVG Cup	1st round
2016–17	Serie D, group C	34	10	9	15	44	56	39	15th ↓	Serie D Cup	Preliminary round
2017–18	Eccellenza	30	12	8	10	47	43	44	7th	FVG Cup	Semifinals
2018–19	Eccellenza	30	14	6	10	38	34	48	5th	FVG Cup	1st round
2019–20	No activity										
2020–21	Seconda Categoria, group A	5	3	2	0	13	7	11	2nd	Seconda Categoria Cup	Interrupted
Source: Messaggero Veneto – Giornale del Friuli

=== Key ===
1st	2nd	↑	↓
Champions	Runners-up	Promoted	Relegated

== Honours ==
- Eccellenza Friuli-Venezia Giulia (1st regional level)

Winners: 2015–16

== Colors and badge ==
AC Cordenonese 3S colors are garnet, orange and green.
