= ASD Sarone =

Sarone
- Full name: Associazione Sportiva Dilettantistica Sarone 1975-2017
- Nicknames: Biancorossi (white & red)
- Founded: 1975; 51 years ago as, Associazione Sportiva Dilettantistica Sarone; 2017; 9 years ago as, Associazione Sportiva Dilettantistica Sarone 1975-2017 (refounded)
- Ground: Stadio Mario Bocchese, Sarone, Italy
- Capacity: 1,000
- Chairman: Marco Mella
- Manager: Steve Agostinetto
- League: Seconda Categoria
- 2007–08: Serie D/C, 18th (relegated)
Home colours	Away colours

Associazione Sportiva Dilettantistica Sarone 1975-2017, simply known as Sarone, was an Italian association football club located in Sarone, a village in the municipality of Caneva, Friuli-Venezia Giulia. It currently plays in Seconda Categoria.

== History ==
The club was founded in 1975, and until the mid 90's it always played in the minor leagues. A series of excellent season played led the club to reach Serie D in 2007. Then began the descent that led Sarone in 2010 to merge with ASD Pro Aviano (Prima Categoria club) to form ASD Pro Aviano SE, club based in Aviano and placed in Promozione, thus decreeing the end of ASD Sarone.

On 28 June 2010, ASD Sporting Sarone was born, which represented the town without being a direct descendant of ASD Sarone. Sporting in 2012 enrolled in the Terza Categoria. In the summer of 2015 Sporting merged with ASD Caneva (Seconda Categoria team) to form ASD SaroneCaneva, a club based in Caneva.

In Sarone it was hard to bear to be left without a team, so in summer 2017 ASD Sarone 1975-2017 was founded. It was composed by the Saronese players of ASD SaroneCaneva and ASD Pro Aviano S.E. and registered in Terza Categoria.

=== Recent seasons ===
Season	League									Cups	
Season	Division	P	W	D	L	F	A	Pts	Pos	Cup	Round
1991–92	Seconda Categoria, group A	30	8	9	13	35	43	25	12th	Region Cup	?
1992–93	Seconda Categoria, group A	30	12	9	9	48	33	33	5th	Region Cup	?
1993–94	Seconda Categoria, group A	30	10	10	10	53	49	30	9th	Region Cup	?
1994–95	Seconda Categoria, group A	30	17	8	5	48	22	42	1st ↑	Region Cup	?
1995–96	Prima Categoria, group A	30	12	8	10	38	34	44	5th	Region Cup	?
1996–97	Prima Categoria, group A	30	15	10	5	42	18	55	1st ↑	Region Cup	?
1997–98	Promozione, group A	30	11	12	7	44	34	45	5th	FVG Cup	1st round
1998–99	Promozione, group A	30	13	9	8	38	31	48	5th	FVG Cup	1st round
1999–00	Promozione, group A	30	11	11	8	36	33	44	4th	FVG Cup	1st round
2000–01	Promozione, group A	30	13	9	8	41	30	48	5th	FVG Cup	1st round
2001–02	Promozione, group A	30	16	8	6	51	23	56	2nd ↑	FVG Cup	2nd round
2002–03	Eccellenza	30	9	12	9	37	40	39	9th	FVG Cup	Quarters
2003–04	Eccellenza	32	9	14	9	42	53	41	7th	FVG Cup	1st round
2004–05	Eccellenza	30	14	11	5	44	18	53	3rd	FVG Cup	1st round
2005–06	Eccellenza	30	11	6	13	30	35	39	9th	FVG Cup	1st round
2006–07	Eccellenza	30	20	7	3	56	22	67	1st ↑	FVG Cup	1st round
2007–08	Serie D, group C	34	6	6	22	33	66	24	18th ↓	Serie D Cup	1st round
2008–09	Eccellenza	30	13	8	9	38	26	47	4th	FVG Cup	1st round
2009–10	Eccellenza	30	3	8	19	21	58	17	16th ↓	FVG Cup	2nd round
2010–17	No activity										
2017–18	Terza Categoria, group A	26	11	5	10	48	38	38	6th	Terza Categoria Cup	Eighters
2018–19	Terza Categoria, group A	24	12	5	7	56	38	41	4th ↑	Terza Categoria Cup	Semifinals
2019–20	Seconda Categoria, group A	22	7	3	12	26	42	24	12th	Seconda Categoria Cup	Interrupted
2020–21	Seconda Categoria, group A	5	1	3	1	5	5	6		Seconda Categoria Cup	Interrupted
Source: Messaggero Veneto – Giornale del Friuli

=== Key ===
1st	2nd	↑	↓
Champions	Runners-up	Promoted	Relegated

== Honours ==
- Eccellenza Friuli-Venezia Giulia (1st regional level)

Winners: 2006–07

- Promozione Friuli-Venezia Giulia (2nd regional level)

Runners-up: 2001–02

- Prima Categoria Friuli-Venezia Giulia (3rd regional level)

Winners: 1996–97

- Seconda Categoria Friuli-Venezia Giulia (4th regional level)

Winners: 1994–95

== Colors and badge ==
The team's colors are white and red.
