= Nemanja Perić =

Serbian footballer

Personal information
- Date of birth: 16 October 1997 (age 29)
- Place of birth: Požarevac, FR Yugoslavia
- Height: 1.76 m (5 ft 9 in)
- Position: Winger

Team information
- Current team: Kras Repen

Senior career*
Years	Team	Apps	(Gls)
2014–2017	Partizan	0	(0)
2014–2017	→ Teleoptik (loan)	53	(9)
2017–2019	Borac Čačak	33	(3)
2019–2020	Budućnost Dobanovci	26	(3)
2020–2021	Novi Pazar	20	(1)
2022	Ponsacco		
2022	San Luigi		
2023–	Kras Repen		
- * Club domestic league appearances and goals as of 17 July 2021

Nemanja Perić (Serbian Cyrillic: Немања Перић; born 16 October 1997) is a Serbian footballer who plays for Italian Promozione side Kras Repen.

== Career statistics ==
As of 31 March 2019

Club	Season	League			Cup		Continental		Other		Total	
Club	Season	Division	Apps	Goals	Apps	Goals	Apps	Goals	Apps	Goals	Apps	Goals
Teleoptik (loan)	2014–15	Serbian League Beograd	21	5	—		—		—		21	5
Teleoptik (loan)	2015–16	Serbian League Beograd	21	2	—		—		—		21	2
Teleoptik (loan)	2016–17	Serbian League Beograd	11	2	—		—		—		11	2
Teleoptik (loan)	Total		53	9	—		—		—		53	9
Borac Čačak	2017–18	Serbian SuperLiga	6	0	1	0	—		—		7	0
Borac Čačak	2018–19	Serbian First League	27	3	1	0	—		—		28	3
Borac Čačak	Total		33	3	2	0	—		—		35	3
Budućnost Dobanovci	2019–20	Serbian First League	0	0	0	0	—		—		0	0
Career total			86	12	2	0	—		—		88	12
