= 1991–92 Eccellenza Friuli-Venezia Giulia =

Eccellenza F.V.G.
- Season: 1991–92
- Champions: Manzanese; 1st title
- Relegated: Cormonese; Lucinico; Maniago
- Top goalscorer: Michele Pinatti – Sacilese (17)

1991–92 Eccellenza Friuli-Venezia Giulia was the 6th level of Italian football, and it was the highest one in this region.

This is the 1st season of Eccellenza, 16 clubs took part in:

- 12 clubs come from Promozione Friuli-Venezia Giulia 1990–91
- 2 clubs were relegated from Interregionale 1990–91
- 2 clubs were promoted from Prima Categoria Friuli-Venezia Giulia 1990–91.

== Teams ==
Province	Team	City/Town
Province of Pordenone	S.S. Fontanafredda	Fontanafredda
Province of Pordenone	A.S. Maniago	Maniago
Province of Pordenone	U.S. Porcia	Porcia
Province of Pordenone	S.S. Sacilese	Sacile
Province of Pordenone	S.P. Tamai	Tamai
Province of Udine	A.S. Cussignacco	Udine
Province of Udine	A.C. Gemonese	Gemona del Friuli
Province of Udine	U.S. Manzanese	Manzano
Province of Udine	A.C. San Daniele	San Daniele del Friuli
Province of Udine	U.S. Serenissima	Pradamano
Province of Gorizia	Cormonese Calcio	Cormons
Province of Gorizia	U.S. Gradese	Grado
Province of Gorizia	U.S. Itala San Marco	Gradisca d'Isonzo
Province of Gorizia	A.S. Lucinico	Lucinico
Province of Gorizia	A.S. Ronchi	Ronchi dei Legionari
Province of Trieste	S.S. San Giovanni	Trieste

== Final table ==
Pos.	Squadra	Pts	P	W	D	L	GF	GA	Df
1.	Manzanese	47	30	18	11	1	49	13	+36
2.	Sacilese (R)	45	30	17	11	2	43	14	+29
3.	Fontanafredda	40	30	15	10	5	46	18	+28
4.	Ronchi	37	30	15	7	8	41	26	+15
5.	Gemonese (P)	32	30	12	8	10	41	41	0
6.	Gradese	32	30	11	10	9	38	32	+6
7.	Porcia	31	30	11	9	10	29	28	+1
8.	Itala San Marco	28	30	8	12	10	33	32	+1
9.	Tamai (P)	28	30	8	12	10	33	34	-1
10.	Cussignacco	27	30	8	11	11	24	31	-7
11.	Serenissima	27	30	8	11	11	28	36	-8
12.	San Daniele	26	30	7	12	11	36	45	-9
13.	San Giovanni (R)	25	30	10	5	15	33	41	-8
14.	Cormonese	25	30	7	11	12	24	31	-7
15.	Lucinico	19	30	5	9	16	21	49	-28
16.	Maniago	11	30	3	5	22	16	55	-39

: domestic cup winners

=== Relegation tie-breake ===
Played in Ronchi dei Legionari on May 10, 1992.

Team 1	Score	Team 2
San Giovanni (Italy)	1–0	(Italy) Cormonese

== See also ==
- Eccellenza Friuli Venezia Giulia
