= 2019–20 Serie D =

Serie D
- Season: 2019–20
- Dates: 1 September 2019 – 20 May 2020
- Champions: not awarded
- Promoted: Lucchese; Pro Sesto; Legnago; Mantova; Grosseto; Matelica; Turris; Foggia; Palermo
- Relegated: Savona (bankruptcy); Fezzanese; Verbania; Ligorna; Levico Terme; Milano City; Dro Alto Garda; Inveruno; Vigasio; Tamai; San Luigi; Villafranca; Vigor Carpaneto (waiver); Ciliverghe; Alfonsine; Savignanese; Pomezia; Bastia; Ponsacco; Tuttocuoio; Cattolica San Marino (bankruptcy); Sangiustese; Avezzano; Chieti; Jesina; Anagni; Tor Sapienza; Ladispoli; Budoni; Grumentum; Agropoli; Roccella; Marsala; San Tommaso; Palmese

The 2019–20 Serie D was the seventy-second edition of the top level Italian non-professional football championship. It represents the fourth tier in the Italian football league system.

The season was ended in advance by the Italian Football Federation on 20 May 2020, after a two-month suspension, due to the COVID-19 pandemic in Italy. On 22 May, the Lega Nazionale Dilettanti formally proposed the nine first-placed teams for promotion to Serie C, with the four bottom teams in each group as the ones to be relegated in the Eccellenza league.

== Changes from 2018–19 ==
Following the 2018–19 season which saw the participation of former Serie A teams such as Bari, Modena, Cesena, Avellino and Reggio Audace (all promoted to Serie C after their first season), new legal incarnations of former top flight clubs Palermo (excluded from Serie B due to financial issues) and Foggia took part in the league, under the Article 52 of N.O.I.F. regulation.

== Teams ==
The composition of the league will involve nine divisions, grouped geographically and named alphabetically.

=== Teams relegated from Serie C ===
None of the teams that were relegated in a normal fashion, by virtue of their finishing positions and unsuccessful playouts in the 2018–19 Serie C season will take part in this campaign.

Cuneo, originally relegated to Serie D, declined to their right to participate in the season, whereas Virtus Verona, Fano, Paganese and Bisceglie were readmitted to Serie C in order to fill various vacancies. Teams returning to Serie D from higher divisions last season as a result of bankruptcy and/or administrative issues include Foggia, Palermo, Lucchese and Arzachena.

=== Teams promoted from Eccellenza ===
Twenty-eight clubs were promoted from the Eccellenza as league winners, plus one as the Coppa Italia Dilettanti winners and seven more as national playoff winners.

Abruzzo

- Chieti

Apulia

- Casarano
- Brindisi^{PO}

Basilicata

- Grementum Val d'Agri

Calabria

- Corigliano

Campania

- Giugliano
- San Tommaso
- Agropoli^{[1]}
- Gladiator^{[1]}

Emilia Romagna

- Correggese
- Alfonsine
- Progresso^{PO}

Friuli Venezia Giulia

- San Luigi

Lazio

- Team Nuova Florida
- Tor Sapienza
- Pomezia^{[1]}

Liguria

- Vado

Lombardy

- Castellanzese
- NibionnoOggiono
- Brusaporto
- Breno^{PO}
- Tritium^{PO}
- Legnano^{[1]}

Marche

- Tolentino
- Porto Sant'Elpidio^{PO}

Molise

- Vastogirardi

Piedmont & Aosta Valley

- Verbania
- Fossano

Sardinia

- Muravera

Sicily

- Licata
- Marina di Ragusa
- Biancavilla^{PO}

Trentino Alto Adige – Südtirol

- Dro

Tuscany

- Grosseto
- Grassina

Umbria

- Foligno

Veneto

- Caldiero Terme^{CI}
- Vigasio
- Luparense
- Mestre^{PO}

- As Coppa Italia Dilettanti finalists.
- As national playoff winners.

=== Repechages ===
A number of vacancies are also expected to be created by some clubs failing to register in Serie C and Serie D. The Serie D committee will fill in these vacancies with additional teams to be chosen among the ones relegated from the league in 2018–19, and other ones who played and lost the Eccellenza promotion playoffs; a classification of the clubs who applied for these vacancies was announced on 18 July 2019.

On 31 July 2019, the Lega Nazionale Dilettanti announced to have admitted Agropoli, Legnago Salus, Pomezia, Olympia Agnonese, Legnano, Gladiator, Tamai and Anagni to fill in all the league vacancies.

=== Previous season's teams not returning ===
Rezzato, Francavilla and Gela opted not to register to the Serie D season.

== Girone A ==
=== League table ===
Pos	Team	Pld	W	D	L	GF	GA	GD	Pts	Promotion, qualification or relegation
1	Lucchese (P)	25	13	9	3	32	19	+13	48	Promotion to Serie C
2	Prato	25	14	5	6	47	26	+21	47	
3	Seravezza Pozzi	25	11	10	4	46	33	+13	43	
4	Casale	25	11	10	4	40	28	+12	43	
5	Caronnese	24	11	9	4	45	29	+16	42	
6	Savona (E, R, R, R)	25	10	6	9	33	31	+2	36	Phoenix in Prima Categoria
7	Real Forte Querceta	25	9	9	7	29	27	+2	36	
8	Borgosesia	25	8	11	6	34	31	+3	35	
9	Sanremese	25	8	9	8	30	27	+3	33	
10	Chieri	25	9	6	10	30	31	−1	33	
11	Fossano	25	9	5	11	38	38	0	32	
12	Lavagnese	25	6	9	10	25	31	−6	27	
13	Bra	25	6	8	11	32	34	−2	26 (Note: Positions determined on head-to-head points per game: Bra 2.000, Ghivizzano 1.333, Fezzanese 0.500.)	
14	Ghivizzano Borgo a Mozzano	25	7	5	13	35	47	−12	26	
15	Fezzanese (R)	25	7	5	13	26	39	−13	26	Relegation to Eccellenza
16	Vado (T)	25	6	6	13	30	43	−13	24	Readmitted
17	Verbania (R)	24	5	8	11	19	42	−23	23	Relegation to Eccellenza
18	Ligorna (R)	25	4	10	11	31	46	−15	22	Relegation to Eccellenza

(E) Eliminated; (P) Promoted; (R) Relegated; (T) Qualified, but not yet for the particular phase indicated

== Girone B ==
=== League table ===
Pos	Team	Pld	W	D	L	GF	GA	GD	Pts	Promotion, qualification or relegation
1	Pro Sesto (P)	27	16	6	5	43	28	+15	54	Promotion to Serie C
2	Legnano	27	15	5	7	38	25	+13	50	
3	Scanzorosciate	27	12	10	5	32	21	+11	46	
4	Arconatese	27	13	5	9	42	36	+6	44	
5	Folgore Caratese	27	11	10	6	31	24	+7	43	
6	NibionnOggiono	27	11	9	7	38	24	+14	42	
7	Tritium	27	11	9	7	38	32	+6	42	
8	Sondrio	27	11	8	8	31	29	+2	41	
9	Seregno	27	9	12	6	32	25	+7	39	
10	Brusaporto	27	11	6	10	27	24	+3	39	
11	Virtus CiseranoBergamo	27	8	11	8	34	35	−1	35	
12	Castellanzese	27	9	8	10	39	41	−2	35	
13	Virtus Bolzano	27	9	7	11	35	34	+1	34	
14	Pontisola	27	8	9	10	29	31	−2	33	
15	Caravaggio	27	7	11	9	41	43	−2	32	
16	Villa d'Almè	27	6	11	10	33	43	−10	29	
17	Levico Terme (R)	27	6	10	11	31	40	−9	28	Relegation to Eccellenza
18	Milano City (Note: 1 point deducted due to financial irregularities.) (R)	27	4	11	12	21	34	−13	22	Relegation to Eccellenza
19	Dro Alto Garda (R)	27	2	11	14	17	37	−20	17	Relegation to Eccellenza
20	Inveruno (R)	27	4	5	18	31	57	−26	17	Relegation to Eccellenza

(P) Promoted; (R) Relegated

== Girone C ==
=== League table ===
Pos	Team	Pld	W	D	L	GF	GA	GD	Pts	Promotion, qualification or relegation
1	Campodarsego (C)	27	15	9	3	44	25	+19	54	
2	Legnago Salus (P)	28	13	10	5	43	32	+11	49	Promotion to Serie C
3	Ambrosiana	28	14	6	8	47	31	+16	48	
4	Union Clodiense Chioggia	27	12	11	4	44	32	+12	47	
5	Mestre	27	13	7	7	37	26	+11	46	
6	Adriese	27	13	5	9	53	36	+17	44	
7	Union Feltre	27	12	8	7	38	25	+13	44	
8	Cartigliano	28	11	9	8	46	37	+9	42	
9	Cjarlins Muzane	28	12	6	10	44	47	−3	42	
10	Luparense	27	10	7	10	49	45	+4	37	
11	Caldiero Terme	27	10	7	10	25	28	−3	37	
12	Chions	28	9	8	11	39	41	−2	35	
13	Este	27	8	10	9	35	35	0	34	
14	Belluno	27	10	4	13	33	38	−5	34	
15	Delta Rovigo	27	8	7	12	31	38	−7	31	
16	Montebelluna	27	6	12	9	26	35	−9	30 (Note: Montebelluna finished ahead of Vigasio on head-to-head points: Vigasio 1–3 Montebelluna.)	
17	Vigasio (R)	27	9	3	15	28	42	−14	30	Relegation to Eccellenza
18	Tamai (R)	27	6	4	17	22	45	−23	22	Relegation to Eccellenza
19	San Luigi (R)	28	5	6	17	36	64	−28	21	Relegation to Eccellenza
20	Villafranca (R)	27	2	11	14	25	43	−18	17	Relegation to Eccellenza

(C) Champions; (P) Promoted; (R) Relegated

== Girone D ==
=== League table ===
Pos	Team	Pld	W	D	L	GF	GA	GD	Pts	Promotion, qualification or relegation
1	Mantova (P)	24	14	9	1	59	31	+28	51	Promotion to Serie C
2	Fiorenzuola	24	13	5	6	36	27	+9	44	
3	Correggese	25	11	8	6	42	31	+11	41	
4	Calvina	25	13	2	10	40	32	+8	41	
5	Lentigione	24	11	7	6	39	31	+8	40	
6	Fanfulla	24	11	7	6	38	31	+7	40	
7	Mezzolara	25	9	9	7	34	33	+1	36	
8	Forlì	24	8	8	8	26	26	0	32	
9	Sporting Franciacorta	24	8	7	9	41	44	−3	31	
10	Breno	24	8	6	10	32	28	+4	30	
11	Sasso Marconi	25	6	11	8	41	43	−2	29	
12	Vigor Carpaneto (E)	24	7	8	9	33	38	−5	29	Club failed to register
13	Progresso	24	7	8	9	24	33	−9	29	
14	Sammaurese (T)	25	5	11	9	33	38	−5	26 (Note: Sammaurese were originally relegated on points per game: Crema 1.042, Sammaurese 1.040.)	Readmitted
15	Crema	24	6	7	11	27	34	−7	25	
16	Ciliverghe (R)	25	6	7	12	28	41	−13	25	Relegation to Eccellenza
17	Alfonsine (R)	25	5	7	13	15	33	−18	22	Relegation to Eccellenza
18	Savignanese (R)	25	4	9	12	24	38	−14	21	Relegation to Eccellenza

(E) Eliminated; (P) Promoted; (R) Relegated; (T) Qualified, but not yet for the particular phase indicated

== Girone E ==
=== League table ===
Pos	Team	Pld	W	D	L	GF	GA	GD	Pts	Promotion, qualification or relegation
1	Grosseto (P)	26	15	7	4	45	25	+20	52	Promotion to Serie C
2	Monterosi	26	14	8	4	35	20	+15	50	
3	Grassina	26	13	7	6	39	32	+7	46	
4	Albalonga	26	12	9	5	36	24	+12	45	
5	Aquila Montevarchi	26	10	10	6	35	26	+9	40	
6	Scandicci	26	11	6	9	45	31	+14	39	
7	Foligno	26	10	6	10	33	27	+6	36	
8	Aglianese	26	7	13	6	35	30	+5	34	
9	Follonica Gavorrano	26	8	10	8	33	31	+2	34	
10	Flaminia	26	7	13	6	31	29	+2	34	
11	Cannara	26	7	12	7	31	31	0	33	
12	Sporting Trestina	26	8	9	9	34	35	−1	33	
13	Sangiovannese	26	9	5	12	25	37	−12	32	
14	San Donato Tavarnelle	26	7	10	9	30	32	−2	31	
15	Pomezia (R)	26	6	8	12	23	34	−11	26	Relegation to Eccellenza
16	Bastia (R)	26	6	8	12	22	36	−14	26	Relegation to Eccellenza
17	Ponsacco (R)	26	4	5	17	20	46	−26	17	Relegation to Eccellenza
18	Tuttocuoio (R)	26	2	10	14	19	45	−26	16	Relegation to Eccellenza

(P) Promoted; (R) Relegated

== Girone F ==
=== League table ===
Pos	Team	Pld	W	D	L	GF	GA	GD	Pts	Promotion, qualification or relegation
1	Matelica (P)	26	16	7	3	49	17	+32	55	Promotion to Serie C
2	Campobasso	26	15	7	4	47	24	+23	52	
3	San Nicolò Notaresco	26	16	4	6	43	30	+13	52	
4	Recanatese	26	14	6	6	48	42	+6	48	
5	Pineto	26	11	10	5	35	30	+5	43	
6	Vastese	26	12	6	8	40	33	+7	42	
7	Olympia Agnonese	26	11	7	8	40	34	+6	40	
8	Montegiorgio	26	10	8	8	32	27	+5	38	
9	Tolentino	26	9	9	8	33	37	−4	36	
10	Atletico Porto Sant'Elpidio	26	9	7	10	40	40	0	34	
11	Vastogirardi	26	8	10	8	42	45	−3	34	
12	Atletico Terme Fiuggi	26	8	9	9	37	37	0	33	
13	Cattolica San Marino (E)	26	6	10	10	31	36	−5	28	Club dissolved
14	Real Giulianova	26	6	10	10	29	40	−11	28	
15	Sangiustese (R)	26	4	8	14	27	39	−12	20	Relegation to Eccellenza
16	Avezzano (R)	26	4	8	14	16	33	−17	20	Relegation to Eccellenza
17	Chieti (R)	26	4	6	16	25	51	−26	18	Relegation to Eccellenza
18	Jesina (R)	26	3	4	19	27	46	−19	13	Relegation to Eccellenza

(E) Eliminated; (P) Promoted; (R) Relegated

== Girone G ==
=== League table ===
Pos	Team	Pld	W	D	L	GF	GA	GD	Pts	Promotion, qualification or relegation
1	Turris (P)	26	18	7	1	65	24	+41	61	Promotion to Serie C
2	Ostiamare	26	17	6	3	46	21	+25	57	
3	Torres	26	14	9	3	44	25	+19	51	
4	Trastevere	26	13	6	7	46	33	+13	45	
5	Sassari Latte Dolce	26	14	3	9	40	29	+11	45	
6	Latina	26	10	9	7	40	30	+10	39	
7	Cassino	26	10	9	7	27	30	−3	39	
8	Vis Artena	26	9	8	9	35	38	−3	35	
9	Muravera	26	8	10	8	33	32	+1	34	
10	Nuova Florida	26	9	6	11	33	35	−2	33	
11	Lanusei	26	6	13	7	23	25	−2	31	
12	Portici	26	7	9	10	31	41	−10	30	
13	Racing Aprilia	26	6	11	9	25	30	−5	29	
14	Arzachena	26	6	9	11	31	39	−8	27	
15	Anagni (R)	26	6	7	13	32	44	−12	25	Relegation to Eccellenza
16	Tor Sapienza (R)	26	4	7	15	23	55	−32	19	Relegation to Eccellenza
17	Ladispoli (R)	26	5	3	18	25	42	−17	18	Relegation to Eccellenza
18	Budoni (R)	26	4	4	18	23	49	−26	16	Relegation to Eccellenza

(P) Promoted; (R) Relegated

== Girone H ==
=== League table ===
Pos	Team	Pld	W	D	L	GF	GA	GD	Pts	Promotion, qualification or relegation
1	Foggia (P)	26	16	6	4	33	16	+17	54	Promotion to Serie C
2	Bitonto (Note: 5 points deducted due to match-fixing.)	26	16	7	3	45	10	+35	50	
3	Sorrento	26	14	8	4	38	21	+17	50	
4	Audace Cerignola	26	15	4	7	45	27	+18	49	
5	Casarano	26	11	9	6	34	28	+6	42	
6	Taranto	26	12	4	10	32	21	+11	40	
7	Gravina	26	9	7	10	36	32	+4	34	
8	Fasano	26	9	7	10	34	31	+3	34	
9	Gelbison	26	8	10	8	20	22	−2	34	
10	Gladiator	26	8	9	9	25	27	−2	33	
11	Team Altamura	26	8	8	10	31	29	+2	32	
12	Brindisi	26	7	10	9	23	35	−12	31	
13	Fidelis Andria	26	8	5	13	31	41	−10	29	
14	Nocerina	26	6	9	11	30	45	−15	27 (Note: Positions determined on head-to-head points: Nocerina 8, Grumentum 5, Nardò 2.)	
15	Grumentum (R)	26	7	6	13	27	39	−12	27	Relegation to Eccellenza
16	Nardò (T)	26	6	9	11	24	34	−10	27	Readmitted
17	Francavilla (T)	26	6	7	13	24	35	−11	25	Readmitted
18	Agropoli (R)	26	3	5	18	14	53	−39	14	Relegation to Eccellenza

(P) Promoted; (R) Relegated; (T) Qualified, but not yet for the particular phase indicated

== Girone I ==
=== League table ===
Pos	Team	Pld	W	D	L	GF	GA	GD	Pts	Promotion, qualification or relegation
1	Palermo (P)	26	20	3	3	47	16	+31	63	Promotion to Serie C
2	Savoia	26	16	8	2	41	15	+26	56	
3	Giugliano	26	14	5	7	40	26	+14	47	
4	FC Messina	26	13	7	6	37	20	+17	46	
5	Troina	26	15	1	10	30	28	+2	46	
6	Acireale (Note: 6 points deducted due to financial irregularities.)	26	14	5	7	44	32	+12	41	
7	Licata	26	12	5	9	36	30	+6	41	
8	Nola	26	10	6	10	32	31	+1	36	
9	ACR Messina	26	11	3	12	30	29	+1	36	
10	Biancavilla	26	10	5	11	23	32	−9	35	
11	Cittanovese	26	10	3	13	31	37	−6	33	
12	Castrovillari	26	8	8	10	43	39	+4	32	
13	Marina di Ragusa	26	6	10	10	22	29	−7	28	
14	Corigliano	26	7	4	15	26	52	−26	25	
15	Roccella (Note: 1 point deducted due to financial irregularities.) (R)	26	6	7	13	22	26	−4	24	Relegation to Eccellenza
16	Marsala (R)	26	6	6	14	25	38	−13	24	Relegation to Eccellenza
17	San Tommaso (R)	26	5	6	15	25	46	−21	21	Relegation to Eccellenza
18	Palmese (R)	26	2	6	18	21	49	−28	12	Relegation to Eccellenza

(P) Promoted; (R) Relegated
