= ASD Manzanese =

Italian football club

Manzanese
- Full name: SSD Manzanese
- Nicknames: Seggiolai (chair makers); Orange
- Founded: 1919; 107 years ago
- Ground: Stadio Giuseppe Morigi, Manzano, Italy
- Capacity: 1,250
- Chairman: Giancarlo Gumini
- Manager: Ernesto Candon
- League: Prima Categoria
- 2020–21: Serie D/C, 3rd (withdrew from next season's competition due to financial issues)
- Website: www.manzanesecalcio.it
Home colours	Away colours

Società Sportiva Dilettantistica Manzanese is an Italian association football club, based in Manzano, Friuli-Venezia Giulia. It currently plays in Prima Categoria.

== History ==
The football history of Manzano can be traced back to the end of the year 1918, beginning of 1919, while the first facility took shape in 1927 in via della Stazione: it is the Luigi Gumini field. In that period the Associazione Sportiva Manzanese was created, whose first president was Count Guglielmo di Manzano. In 1959 Gastone Fornasarig was elected president, who in 1962 was replaced by Gianfranco Sabot, who was also the team captain. The sporting director was Giuseppe Morigi, who held the position for more than 30 years. On 10 October 1976 the Municipal Sports Center in via Olivo was inaugurated, the current headquarters. In the 1977–78 season, the Manzanese won the right to participate in the Promozione (current Eccellenza) under the guidance of Diego Coralli and the presidency of Armando Stacco. In 1978–79 the Manzano club will weave the first foreign footballer, Žarko Rot from the Yugoslav federation. in the following years,many presidents and successes follow one another. In the 1991–92 season the orange won the championship of Eccellenza and the following year they participated in the Serie D: the coach was Andrea Mandorlini, former Verona coach. From the 1993–94 to 2003–04 season the president was Vinicio Sabot. In the 1996–97 season the Manzanese won the FVG Cup with the coach Giovanni Tortolo. In 2004–05, Renato De Sabbata was elected president, who remained in office until the 2007–08 season, replaced by Nelio Taboga, who is still in the saddle. The agreement with Inter for the Soccer School and with Virtus Corno and Villa Vicentina for the youth sector was an important moment for the club. In the youth sector alone, where the series successes of the Juniors stand out at the regional level, consists of about 160 boys aged 5 to 16. A hub of young talents who have also found outlets in professionalism.

=== Recent seasons ===
Season	League									Cups	
Season	Division	P	W	D	L	F	A	Pts	Pos	Cup	Round
1959–60	Prima Categoria, group A	26	12	9	5	45	31	33	3rd	No cups	
1960–61	Prima Categoria, group A	30	16	8	4	54	24	40	2nd	No cups	
1961–62	Prima Categoria, group A	30	8	14	8	32	38	30	6th	No cups	
1962–63	Prima Categoria, group B	30	18	9	3	40	22	45	1st	No cups	
1963–64	Prima Categoria, group A	30	17	9	4	48	25	43	1st	No cups	
1964–65	Prima Categoria, group B	30	19	6	5	43	44	47	1st	No cups	
1965–66	Prima Categoria, group A	30	16	10	4	44	18	42	2nd	No cups	
1966–67	Prima Categoria, group B	30	14	9	7	47	25	37	3rd	Coppa Italia Dilettanti	5th round
1967–68	Prima Categoria, group A	30	14	8	8	28	23	36	4th	Coppa Italia Dilettanti	4th round
1968–69	Prima Categoria, group B	30	9	8	13	32	37	26	12th ↓	Coppa Italia Dilettanti	1st round
1969–70										Coppa Italia Dilettanti	Not allowed
1970–71	Prima Categoria, group B								1st ↑	Coppa Italia Dilettanti	Not allowed
1971–72	Promozione	30	11	11	8	41	24	33	4th	Coppa Italia Dilettanti	2nd round
1972–73	Promozione	30	10	16	4	25	15	36	3rd	Coppa Italia Dilettanti	2nd round
1973–74	Promozione	30	8	12	10	29	33	28	9th	Coppa Italia Dilettanti	2nd round
1974–75	Promozione	30	6	9	15	25	43	50	15th ↓	Coppa Italia Dilettanti	2nd round
1975–76										Coppa Italia Dilettanti	Not allowed
1976–77										Coppa Italia Dilettanti	Not allowed
1977–78	Prima Categoria, group B								1st ↑	Coppa Italia Dilettanti	Not allowed
1978–79	Promozione	30	9	12	9	32	31	30	7th	Coppa Italia Dilettanti	1st round
1979–80	Promozione	30	12	10	8	29	21	34	5th	Coppa Italia Dilettanti	2nd round
1980–81	Promozione	30	12	11	7	39	17	35	6th	Coppa Italia Dilettanti	4th round
1981–82	Promozione	30	17	10	3	44	21	44	1st ↑	Coppa Italia Dilettanti	1st round
1982–83	Interregionale, group C	30	3	12	15	20	41	18	15th ↓	Coppa Italia Dilettanti	1st round
1983–84	Promozione	30	13	16	1	35	18	42	1st ↑	Coppa Italia Dilettanti	1st round
1984–85	Interregionale, group D	30	14	7	9	25	30	41	4th	Coppa Italia Dilettanti	2nd round
1985–86	Interregionale, group C	30	6	12	12	21	25	24	14th ↓	Coppa Italia Dilettanti	1st round
1986–87	Promozione	30	12	9	9	36	27	33	6th	Coppa Italia Dilettanti	1st round
1987–88	Promozione	30	8	12	10	29	32	28	10th	Coppa Italia Dilettanti	2nd round
1988–89	Promozione	30	12	10	8	34	26	34	4th	Coppa Italia Dilettanti	1st round
1989–90	Promozione	30	12	9	9	36	25	33	5th	Coppa Italia Dilettanti	4th round
1990–91	Promozione	30	12	12	6	36	25	36	3rd	Coppa Italia Dilettanti	1st round
1991–92	Eccellenza	30	18	11	1	49	13	47	1st ↑	FVG Cup	Quarters
1992–93	CND, group D	34	10	15	9	33	31	35	10th	Coppa Italia Dilettanti	?
1993–94	CND, group D	34	7	12	15	27	47	26	16th ↓	Coppa Italia Dilettanti	?
1994–95	Eccellenza	30	8	13	9	28	31	29	9th	FVG Cup	Semifinals
1995–96	Eccellenza	30	12	13	5	41	22	49	4th	FVG Cup	3rd round
1996–97	Eccellenza	30	11	13	6	37	21	46	4th	FVG Cup	Winners
1996–97	Eccellenza	30	11	13	6	37	21	46	4th	Coppa Italia Dilettanti	1st round
1997–98	Eccellenza	30	10	9	11	32	31	39	9th	FVG Cup	Semifinals
1998–99	Eccellenza	30	11	8	11	39	46	41	9th	FVG Cup	3rd round
1999–00	Eccellenza	30	11	10	9	30	30	43	6th	FVG Cup	1st round
2000–01	Eccellenza	30	10	9	11	47	39	39	10th	FVG Cup	1st round
2001–02	Eccellenza	30	15	5	10	40	28	50	4th	FVG Cup	1st round
2002–03	Eccellenza	30	7	10	13	33	45	31	13th	FVG Cup	Semifinals
2003–04	Eccellenza	32	9	10	13	32	39	37	14th	FVG Cup	1st round
2004–05	Eccellenza	30	16	11	3	49	21	59	1st ↑	FVG Cup	1st round
2005–06	Serie D, group D	38	8	11	19	41	59	35	19th ↓	Serie D Cup	1st round
2006–07	Eccellenza	30	16	12	2	53	12	60	3rd	FVG Cup	Winners
2006–07	Eccellenza	30	16	12	2	53	12	60	3rd	Coppa Italia Dilettanti	Quarters
2007–08	Eccellenza	30	16	6	8	45	24	54	2nd	FVG Cup	Runners-up
2008–09	Eccellenza	30	17	11	2	50	11	62	1st ↑	FVG Cup	Semifinals
2009–10	Serie D, group C	38	5	9	24	29	55	24	18th ↓	Serie D Cup	Preliminary round
2010–11	Eccellenza	32	15	8	9	34	20	53	3rd	FVG Cup	Quarters
2011–12	Eccellenza	30	14	8	8	42	30	50	5th	FVG Cup	Winners
2011–12	Eccellenza	30	14	8	8	42	30	50	5th	Coppa Italia Dilettanti	1st round
2012–13	Eccellenza	32	10	11	11	45	43	41	9th	FVG Cup	Eighters
2013–14	Eccellenza	30	9	12	9	38	36	39	10th	FVG Cup	1st round
2014–15	Eccellenza	30	10	10	10	32	32	40	8th	FVG Cup	1st round
2015–16	Eccellenza	30	9	7	14	36	40	34	13th	FVG Cup	1st round
2016–17	Eccellenza	30	9	7	14	28	35	34	11th	FVG Cup	1st round
2017–18	Eccellenza	30	12	6	12	38	43	42	9th	FVG Cup	1st round
2018–19	Eccellenza	30	11	6	13	38	49	39	10th	FVG Cup	Quarters
2019–20	Eccellenza	22	16	3	3	41	13	51	1st ↑	FVG Cup	Winners
2019–20	Eccellenza	22	16	3	3	41	13	51	1st ↑	Coppa Italia Dilettanti	Interrupted
2020–21	Serie D, group C									Serie D cup	Not held
Source: Messaggero Veneto – Giornale del Friuli

=== Key ===
1st	2nd	↑	↓
Champions	Runners-up	Promoted	Relegated

- Top regional leagues in Friuli-Venezia Giulia (FVG) :
  - 1959–1969 Prima Categoria (2 groups)
  - 1969–1991 Promozione (1 group)
  - 1991–today Eccellenza (1 group)
- Serie D name changes :
  - 1959–1981 Serie D (more groups)
  - 1981–1992 Interregionale (more groups)
  - 1992–2000 Campionato Nazionale Dilettanti (CND) (more groups)
  - 2000-today Serie D (more groups)

== Honours ==
- Eccellenza Friuli-Venezia Giulia
  - Winners: 1991–92, 2004–05, 2008–09, 2019–20
- Coppa Italia Dilettanti Friuli-Venezia Giulia
  - Winners: 1996–97, 2006–07, 2011–12, 2019–20
