= Dimas (footballer, born 1984) =

Brazilian footballer

Personal information
- Full name: Dimas Gonçalves de Oliveira
- Date of birth: 30 September 1984 (age 42)
- Place of birth: São Paulo, Brazil
- Height: 1.86 m (6 ft 1 in)
- Position: Forward

Team information
- Current team: Azzanese

Senior career*
Years	Team	Apps	(Gls)
2004–2005	Villafranca	14	(9)
2005–2007	Virtus Verona	32	(0)
2007–2009	Sambonifacese	64	(11)
2009–2010	Chievo	0	(0)
2009–2010	→ Monza (loan)	15	(0)
2010	→ Sambonifacese (loan)	11	(9)
2010–2012	Montichiari	57	(23)
2012–2013	Borgo-a-Buggiano	30	(14)
2013–2014	Teramo	33	(12)
2014–2015	Virtus Verona	33	(17)
2015	Campobasso	9	(1)
2015–2016	Levico Terme	13	(3)
2016–2017	Pergolettese	25	(10)
2017–2019	Chions		
2019–2020	Montecchio Maggiore	0	(0)
2020–2021	Torviscosa		
2021–2022	Sacilese		
- * Club domestic league appearances and goals as of 30 September 2023

Dimas Gonçalves de Oliveira (born 30 September 1984) is a Brazilian footballer who plays for Italian club Azzanese.

== Career ==
Dimas signed his first professional contract in 2004 for Villafranca, after eighteen games who scores three goals signed in July 2005 for U.S.D. Virtusvecomp Verona. He left after two years U.S.D. Virtusvecomp Verona in August 2007 and signed for A.C. Sambonifacese. On 12 August 2009 A.C. ChievoVerona have contracted the Brazilian striker, the 25-year-old joins from A.C. Sambonifacese and the contract runs over three-years and joined on 27 August 2009 on loan to A.C. Monza Brianza 1912 between 30 June 2010.

On 1 February 2010 Dimas joined (on loan) another time the A.C. Sambonifacese.

In summer 2010, Dimas joined Montichiari for €30,000. Chievo also retained 50% registration rights, but gave up in June 2011 for free.

Since 2014 he played for 4 Serie D clubs, most recently Pergolettese.

In summer 2017 he joined ASD Chions. With them he won the Eccellenza Friuli-Venezia Giulia getting the promotion to Serie D.

Ahead of the 2019/20 season, Dimas joined Montecchio Maggiore.

Ahead of the 2020/21 season, Dimas joined Torviscosa, and during the 2021/22 season, Dimas joined Sacilese, both teams in the Friuli regional leagues.
