= Fabio Bravo =

Italian footballer

Personal information
- Date of birth: 4 September 1989 (age 37)
- Place of birth: Portogruaro, Italy
- Height: 1.77 m (5 ft 10 in)
- Position: Midfielder

Senior career*
Years	Team	Apps	(Gls)
2007–2008	Sandonà	33	(1)
2008–2009	Carpi	31	(8)
2009–2011	Giacomense	49	(7)
2011–2012	Sacilese Calcio	23	(3)
2012–2013	Città di Concordia	12	(3)
2013	Kras	10	(0)
2013	Gaz Metan Mediaş	2	(0)
2014–2015	Vittorio Falmec	29	(8)
2016–2017	Lignano	7	(1)
Total		196	(31)
- * Club domestic league appearances and goals as of 29 September 2020

Fabio Bravo (born 4 September 1989) is a former Italian footballer who played as a midfielder. In 2013 he had his only experience outside Italy playing in Romania for Liga I club Gaz Metan Mediaş.
