= ASD Pro Romans =

Italian football club

Pro Romans
- Full name: Associazione Sportiva Dilettantistica Pro Romans 1921
- Nickname: Scussons (beetles)
- Founded: 1921; 105 years ago as, Associazione Sportiva Pro Romans; 2004; 22 years ago as, Associazione Sportiva Dilettantistica Pro Romans; 2012; 14 years ago as, Associazione Sportiva Dilettantistica Pro Romans Medea (merged); 2024; 2 years ago as, Associazione Sportiva Dilettantistica Pro Romans 1921
- Ground: Stadio Comunale F.lli Calligaris, Romans d'Isonzo, Italy
- Capacity: 950
- Chairman: Davide Demasi
- Manager: Lorenzo Sellan
- League: Seconda Categoria
- 2004–05: Serie D/C, 17th (relegated)
- Website: http://www.proromanscalcio.it/
Home colours	Away colours

Associazione Sportiva Dilettantistica Pro Romans 1921, or simply Pro Romans, is an Italian association football club located in Romans d'Isonzo, Friuli-Venezia Giulia. It currently plays in Seconda Categoria.

== History ==
The club was founded in 1921 as A.S. Pro Romans (it will become A.S.D. in 2004/05 for fiscal reasons), even if in 1916 the "Club Footbalistico Romans" was already present. The new Romans football reality was founded in the rooms of the "Al Leon d'Oro" restaurant in via Latina, the historic seat of the association, under the help of the owners of the same, the brothers Giorgio and Alberto Candussi, while as the first president of the newborn was Attilio Dessabo, popularly known as "Tilio Bocul".
Pro Romans matches were played in Campo Comunale in via Aquileia, which was subsequently modified and transformed as it still appears today, while the new one, in via Atleti Azzurri d'Italia, on which the senior team plays today, was inaugurated on 17 September 2000, and in 2002 named after the "Calligaris Brothers", that is Mario, Armando and Alessandro, three pioneers of Romans football. Three true glories of Italian football also passed through Pro Romans: the future Italian coach Enzo Bearzot, world champion in 1982 in Spain and Tarcisio Burgnich, later player for Udinese, Juventus, Inter and Napoli and vice-champion of the world in 1970.
After years in which satisfactions and bitterness alternate, in 1995 the great turning point of Pro Romans matures, with the entry into the club of the dynamic Silvano Lorenzon, who as president of the association takes an exciting cycle that brings the club, in 2003–04 to leap into Serie D, as well as winning the Regional Coppa Italia and reaching the quarter-finals of the Coppa Italia Dilettanti. It is the peak, then a slow decline begins. In 2012 the merger with ASD Medea arrives, which starts the current club on the banks of Isonzo river.

=== Recent seasons ===
Season	League									Cups	
Season	Division	P	W	D	L	F	A	Pts	Pos	Cup	Round
1946–47	Prima Divisione, group E								1st	No cups	
1947–48	Prima Divisione, group D	18	11	3	4	37	18	25	2nd	No cups	
1948–49	Prima Divisione, group A							17	12th	No cups	
1949–50										No cups	
1950–51	Prima Divisione, group C								1st ↑	No cups	
1951–52	Lega Interregionale Nord, group A	34	7	4	23	54	92	18	17th ↓	No cups	
1952–53	Promozione, group A									No cups	
1953–54	Promozione, group B									No cups	
1954–55	Promozione, group A	30	9	14	7	32	29	32	5th	No cups	
1955–56	Promozione, group B	30	10	7	13	56	61	27	10th	No cups	
1956–57	Promozione, group A	30	10	11	9	49	47	31	5th	No cups	
1957–58	Campionato Dilettanti, group B	34	12	5	17	45	61	29	13th	No cups	
1958–59	Campionato Dilettanti, group A	34	7	15	12	36	47	29	13th	No cups	
1959–60	Prima Categoria, group C	26	10	6	10	31	39	26	8th	No cups	
1960–61	Prima Categoria, group C	28	13	6	9	33	41	32	7th	No cups	
1961–62	Prima Categoria, group A	30	17	7	6	49	26	41	2nd	No cups	
1962–63	Prima Categoria, group B	30	9	9	12	33	33	27	7th	No cups	
1963–64	Prima Categoria, group A	30	7	9	14	31	42	23	15th ↓	No cups	
1964–65	Seconda Categoria, group H	22	13	5	4	38	10	31	2nd	No cups	
1965–66	Seconda Categoria, group D	26	11	7	8	33	29	29	4th	No cups	
1966–67	Seconda Categoria, group D	26	7	7	12	20	27	21	11th	Coppa Italia Dilettanti	Not allowed
1967–68	Seconda Categoria, group D	30	8	9	13	36	38	25	12th	Coppa Italia Dilettanti	Not allowed
1968–69	Seconda Categoria, group D	30	15	8	7	48	30	38	3rd	Coppa Italia Dilettanti	Not allowed
1969–91	No data										
1991–92	Prima Categoria, group B	30	8	17	15	41	32	33	7th	Region Cup	?
1992–93	Prima Categoria, group B	30	7	13	10	22	33	27	9th	Region Cup	?
1993–94	Prima Categoria, group B	30	9	10	11	23	31	28	9th	Region Cup	?
1994–95	Prima Categoria, group B	30	5	9	16	26	43	19	15th ↓	Region Cup	?
1995–96	Seconda Categoria, group C	26	9	12	5	30	20	39	6th	Region Cup	?
1996–97	Seconda Categoria, group C	26	16	6	4	43	19	54	2nd ↑	Region Cup	?
1997–98	Prima Categoria, group C	30	14	12	4	45	27	54	4th	Region Cup	?
1998–99	Prima Categoria, group C	30								Region Cup	?
1999–00	Prima Categoria, group C	30	18	10	2	59	22	64	1st ↑	Region Cup	?
2000–01	Promozione, group B	30	18	6	6	52	28	60	1st ↑	FVG Cup	Semifinals
2001–02	Eccellenza	30	10	13	7	40	28	43	5th	FVG Cup	Semifinals
2002–03	Eccellenza	30	13	3	9	49	18	55	3rd	Eccellenza Cup	Runners-up
2003–04	Eccellenza	32	19	5	8	56	31	62	1st ↑	FVG Cup	Winners
2003–04	Eccellenza	32	19	5	8	56	31	62	1st ↑	Coppa Italia Dilettanti	Quarters
2004–05	Serie D, group C	34	8	8	18	35	55	32	17th ↓	Serie D Cup	1st round
2005–06	Eccellenza	30	11	9	10	33	35	42	6th	FVG Cup	1st round
2006–07	Eccellenza	30	4	13	13	19	45	25	16th ↓	FVG Cup	2nd round
2007–08	Promozione, group B	30	5	7	18	20	42	22	16th ↓	FVG Cup	1st round
2008–09	Prima Categoria, group C	30	13	11	6	43	30	50	4th	Prima Categoria Cup	1st round
2009–10	Prima Categoria, group C	30	13	11	6	42	29	50	2nd ↑	Prima Categoria Cup	2nd round
2010–11	Promozione, group B	30	9	12	9	33	32	39	9th	FVG Cup	1st round
2011–12	Promozione, group B	30	8	11	11	28	35	35	12th	FVG Cup	1st round
2012–13	Promozione, group B	30	8	7	15	34	48	31	13th	FVG Cup	1st round
2013–14	Promozione, group B	30	4	4	22	17	48	16	14th ↓	Promozione Cup	Eighters
2014–15	Prima Categoria, group C	28	11	6	11	38	37	39	8th	Prima Categoria Cup	1st round
2015–16	Prima Categoria, group C	30	8	12	10	36	40	36	12th	Prima Categoria Cup	1st round
2016–17	Prima Categoria, group C	30	17	8	5	49	27	59	2nd ↑	Prima Categoria Cup	1st round
2017–18	Promozione, group B	30	10	5	15	35	52	35	9th	Promozione Cup	1st round
2018–19	Promozione, group B	30	12	9	9	42	36	45	5th	Promozione Cup	1st round
2019–20	Promozione, group B	22	14	3	5	45	26	45	4th	Promozione Cup	Interrupted
2020–21	Promozione, group B	5	1	1	3	5	7	4		Promozione Cup	Interrupted
Source: Messaggero Veneto – Giornale del Friuli

=== Key ===
1st	2nd	↑	↓
Champions	Runners-up	Promoted	Relegated

== Honours ==
- Eccellenza Friuli-Venezia Giulia (1st regional level)

Winners: 2003–04

- Promozione Friuli-Venezia Giulia (2nd regional level)

Winners: 2000–01

- Prima Categoria Friuli-Venezia Giulia (3rd regional level)

Winners: 1999–00

- Coppa Italia Dilettanti Friuli-Venezia Giulia

Winners: 2003–04

== Colors and badge ==
ASD Pro Romans Medea colors are yellow and red.
