= ASD San Luigi Calcio =

Italian football club

San Luigi
- Full name: Associazione Sportiva Dilettantistica San Luigi Calcio
- Nicknames: Biancoverdi (white & green)
- Founded: 1951; 75 years ago as, Associazione Sportiva Esperia; 1972; 54 years ago as, Esperia San Luigi; 1986; 40 years ago as, San Luigi Vivai Busà; 2004; 22 years ago as, Associazione Sportiva Dilettantistica San Luigi Calcio
- Ground: Stadio Comunale Via Felluga, Trieste, Italy
- Capacity: 1,000
- Chairman: Ezio Peruzzo; Vincenzo Settimo (vice president)
- Manager: Massimiliano Pocecco
- League: Eccellenza Friuli Venezia Giulia
- 2025–26: Serie D/C, 16th (relegated after play-off)
- Website: www.sanluigicalcio.it
Home colours	Away colours	Third colours

Associazione Sportiva Dilettantistica San Luigi Calcio, or simply San Luigi, is an Italian association football club located in Trieste, Friuli-Venezia Giulia. It currently plays in Eccellenza Friuli Venezia Giulia.

== History ==
The club was established on 1 August 1951 under the name of A.S. Esperia (Esperia means "land of the West", name given by the ancient Greeks to the Italian peninsula for being located west of Greece, in the direction indicated by the Star Of Hope), with Mario Basso as president and headquarters in via Raffineria and pitch in Servola.
In the 1951–52 season the adventure starts with the participation of the first team in Terza Categoria league and an Allievi (under 16 years old) team in the youth league.
In 1963 the home field was closed to make place for the construction of public housing, given that in that period the district of San Luigi was developing and the president Basso agreed to move the headquarters to via dei Mille, on the hill of San Luigi; then, on 20 June 1972, the name changes in Esperia San Luigi. As members of the board of directors enter former players who give impetus to a new course in the youth sector.
In the 1975–76 season the youth sector was expanded with the inclusion of teams in other categories. On 12 June 1979 the club takes the name A.C. San Luigi For You and Paolo Cecada was elected president, who was replaced in 1982 by Ezio Peruzzo.
Shortly thereafter, the headquarters were moved to the current prefabricated building close to the two playing fields.
On 31 May 1984 the club became A.C. San Luigi and later A.S.D. San Luigi since 2004. The club, in a few years, passes from the Terza Categoria to Promozione and Eccellenza and also to Serie D. Even the youth sector, which has over 200 young players, reaped successes. The flagship is the conquest of a title of Italian champions obtained by the Juniores (under 18 years old) team in the 2003–04 season. A real source of pride for the green-and-white colors.

The 2014–15 season is very unlucky for San Luigi: runners-up in Promozione Cup and in the league against A.S.D. Torviscosa and in the play-offs against A.S.D. Flaibano. The revenge against Torviscosa comes in 2018: in the FVG Cup (the cup for the Eccellenza Friuli-Venezia Giulia teams), San Luigi wins. The following year, 2019, San Luigi wins the FVG Cup again (3–1 against A.S.D. Edmondo Brian) making it the first team to win this trophy for two consecutive years. In 2019 it also wins the league and climbs to Serie D for the first time in its history.

=== Recent seasons ===
Season	League									Cups	
Season	Division	P	W	D	L	F	A	Pts	Pos	Cup	Round
1991–92	Promozione, group A	30	11	12	7	29	27	34	6th	FVG Cup	1st round
1992–93	Promozione, group B	30	16	11	3	49	20	43	1st ↑	FVG Cup	1st round
1993–94	Eccellenza	30	6	9	15	19	39	21	14th ↓	FVG Cup	1st round
1994–95	Promozione, group B	30	7	14	9	27	38	28	9th	FVG Cup	2nd round
1995–96	Promozione, group B	30	9	8	13	30	36	35	12th	FVG Cup	1st round
1996–97	Promozione, group B	30	12	9	9	39	31	45	4th	FVG Cup	1st round
1997–98	Promozione, group B	30	19	7	4	62	23	64	1st ↑	FVG Cup	2nd round
1998–99	Eccellenza	30	9	7	14	30	37	34	11th	FVG Cup	2nd round
1999–00	Eccellenza	30	9	10	11	31	41	37	10th	FVG Cup	1st round
2000–01	Eccellenza	30	10	8	12	37	34	38	12th	FVG Cup	Semifinals
2001–02	Eccellenza	30	10	12	8	32	28	42	8th	FVG Cup	2nd round
2002–03	Eccellenza	30	12	8	10	50	41	44	5th	FVG Cup	1st round
2003–04	Eccellenza	32	13	11	8	49	41	50	5th	FVG Cup	2nd round
2004–05	Eccellenza	30	3	16	11	22	32	25	14th ↓	FVG Cup	1st round
2005–06	Promozione, group B	30	13	11	6	50	29	50	3rd	FVG Cup	1st round
2006–07	Promozione, group B	30	12	8	10	52	38	44	6th	FVG Cup	1st round
2007–08	Promozione, group B	30	19	6	5	58	25	63	1st ↑	FVG Cup	1st round
2008–09	Eccellenza	30	11	11	8	34	26	44	5th	FVG Cup	2nd round
2009–10	Eccellenza	30	9	13	8	41	36	40	6th	FVG Cup	1st round
2010–11	Eccellenza	32	14	10	8	60	44	52	5th	FVG Cup	Quarters
2011–12	Eccellenza	30	15	7	8	46	30	52	3rd	FVG Cup	1st round
2012–13	Eccellenza	32	10	10	12	39	48	73	9th	FVG Cup	Quarters
2013–14	Eccellenza	30	6	11	13	33	48	29	15th ↓	FVG Cup	1st round
2014–15	Promozione, group B	30	18	9	3	53	23	63	2nd	Promozione Cup	Runners-up
2015–16	Promozione, group B	30	23	4	3	75	23	73	1st ↑	Promozione Cup	Eighters
2016–17	Eccellenza	30	12	6	12	48	46	42	8th	FVG Cup	1st round
2017–18	Eccellenza	30	15	6	9	56	48	51	5th	FVG Cup	Winners
2017–18	Eccellenza	30	15	6	9	56	48	51	5th	Coppa Italia Dilettanti	1st round
2018–19	Eccellenza	30	22	6	2	75	31	72	1st ↑	FVG Cup	Winners
2018–19	Eccellenza	30	22	6	2	75	31	72	1st ↑	Coppa Italia Dilettanti	1st round
2019–20	Serie D, group C	28	5	6	17	36	64	21	19th ↓	Serie D Cup	Interrupted
2020–21	Eccellenza									FVG Cup	Interrupted
Source: Messaggero Veneto – Giornale del Friuli

=== Key ===
1st	2nd	↑	↓
Champions	Runners-up	Promoted	Relegated

== Honours ==
- Eccellenza Friuli-Venezia Giulia (1st regional level)

Winners: 2018–19

- Promozione Friuli-Venezia Giulia (2nd regional level)

Winners: 1992–93, 1997–98, 2007–08, 2015–16

- Coppa Italia Dilettanti Friuli-Venezia Giulia

Winners: 2017–18, 2018–19

== Colors and badge ==
The team's colors are white and green.
