= Muhamed Olawale =

Ivorian footballer

Personal information
- Full name: Muhamed Tehe Olawale
- Date of birth: 20 February 1998 (age 28)
- Height: 1.87 m (6 ft 2 in)
- Position: Forward

Team information
- Current team: Mariehamn
- Number: 18

Youth career
- –2018: Empoli

Senior career*
Years	Team	Apps	(Gls)
2018–2019	Pistoiese	0	(0)
2018–2019	→ Ponsacco (loan)	8	(0)
2019–2020	Ponsacco	16	(9)
2020–2022	Parma	0	(0)
2020	→ TPS (loan)	21	(3)
2021	→ Mariehamn (loan)	26	(6)
2022	→ Voluntari (loan)	6	(0)
2022–	Mariehamn	67	(13)
- * Club domestic league appearances and goals as of 20 November 2025

Muhamed Tehe Olawale (born 20 February 1999) is an Ivorian footballer who plays for Finnish club Mariehamn.

== Club career ==
On 7 January 2021, he was loaned to Finnish side IFK Mariehamn.

On 6 January 2022, he moved on loan to Voluntari in Romania for the term of 1.5 years.

On 25 July 2022, Olawale returned to Mariehamn on a contract until the end of 2023 season.

== Career statistics ==
As of 27 April 2025

Club	Season	League			Cup (Note: Includes Coppa Italia, Suomen Cup and Cupa României)		League Cup		Other		Total	
Club	Season	Division	Apps	Goals	Apps	Goals	Apps	Goals	Apps	Goals	Apps	Goals
Pistoiese	2018–19	Serie C	0	0	0	0	–		0	0	0	0
Ponsacco (loan)	2018–19	Serie D	8	0	0	0	1 (Note: Appearances in the Coppa Italia Serie D)	0	2 (Note: Appearances in the Serie D play/off)	0	11	0
Ponsacco	2019–20	Serie D	16	9	1	1	1	0	0	0	18	10
Parma	2020–21	Serie A	0	0	0	0	–		0	0	0	0
TPS (loan)	2020	Veikkausliiga	21	3	2 (Note: Appearances in the Suomen Cup)	3	–		2 (Note: Appearances in the Veikkausliiga relegation play-offs)	0	25	6
IFK Mariehamn (loan)	2021	Veikkausliiga	26	6	3	1	–		–		29	7
Voluntari (loan)	2021–22	Liga I	6	0	1	0	–		–		7	0
IFK Mariehamn	2022	Veikkausliiga	12	2	0	0	0	0	–		12	2
IFK Mariehamn	2023	Veikkausliiga	11	2	1	0	0	0	–		12	2
IFK Mariehamn	2024	Veikkausliiga	26	4	2	2	5 (Note: Includes Finnish League Cup)	0	–		33	6
IFK Mariehamn	2025	Veikkausliiga	3	2	1	0	0	0	–		4	2
IFK Mariehamn	Total		52	10	4	2	5	0	0	0	61	12
Career total			129	28	11	7	7	0	4	0	152	35
