= Eccellenza Friuli Venezia Giulia =

- Organising body: Lega Nazionale Dilettanti
- Founded: 1991
- Country: Italy
- Confederation: UEFA
- Number of clubs: 18
- Promotion to: Serie D
- Relegation to: Promozione FVG
- League cup(s): Coppa Friuli-Venezia Giulia; Coppa Italia Dilettanti
- Current champions: L.M.E. (2025–26)
- Most championships: Manzanese (4 titles)
- Website: https://friuliveneziagiulia.lnd.it/index.php

Eccellenza Friuli Venezia Giulia is the regional Eccellenza football division for clubs in the northern Italian region of Friuli-Venezia Giulia, Italy. It is competed amongst 16 teams, in one group. The winners of the Groups are promoted to Serie D. The club who finishes second also have the chance to gain promotion; they are entered into a national play-off which consists of two rounds.

== Champions ==
Here are the past champions of the Friuli Venezia Giulia Eccellenza, organised into their respective seasons.

- 1991–92: Manzanese
- 1992–93: Pro Gorizia
- 1993–94: Sanvitese
- 1994–95: Palmanova
- 1995–96: Cormonese
- 1996–97: Tamai
- 1997–98: Itala San Marco
- 1998–99: Pro Gorizia
- 1999–2000: Sevegliano
- 2000–01: Tamai
- 2001–02: Monfalcone
- 2002–03: Sacilese
- 2003–04: Pro Romans
- 2004–05: Manzanese
- 2005–06: Pordenone
- 2006–07: Sarone
- 2007–08: Pordenone
- 2008–09: Manzanese
- 2009–10: Torviscosa
- 2010–11: I.S.M. Gradisca
- 2011–12: Kras
- 2012–13: Unione Fincantieri Monfalcone
- 2013–14: Fontanafredda
- 2014–15: Unione Fincantieri Monfalcone
- 2015–16: Cordenons
- 2016–17: Cjarlins Muzane
- 2017–18: Chions
- 2018–19: San Luigi
- 2019–20: Manzanese
- 2020–21: Not awarded
- 2021–22: Torviscosa
- 2022–23: Chions
- 2023–24: Brian Lignano
- 2024–25: San Luigi
- 2025–26: L.M.E.
