= NK Kras Repen =

Italian football club

Kras Repen
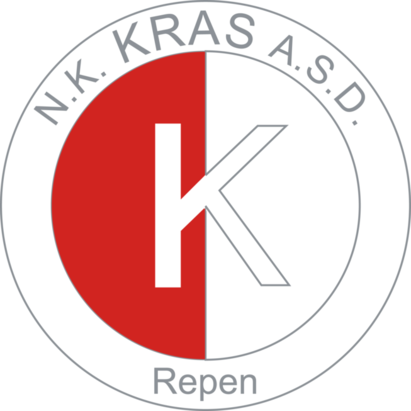
- Full name: Associazione sportiva dilettantistica – Nogometni klub Kras Repen
- Nickname: Furie rosse del Carso (Red Furies of the Karst)
- Founded: 1986; 40 years ago
- Ground: Občinsko športno igrišče Daria Škabarja
- President: Goran Kocman
- Head coach: Luigino Sandrin
- League: Eccellenza
- 2025–26: Eccellenza Friuli-Venezia Giulia, 6th of 18
- Website: nkkras.it
Home colours	Away colours

Associazione sportiva dilettantistica – Nogometni klub Kras Repen or simply NK Kras Repen is a semi-professional Italian football club located in Repen, a village in the comune of Monrupino, Friuli-Venezia Giulia. The team plays in the Eccellenza, the fifth tier of Italian football.

== History ==
NK Kras Repen was formally established in Repen, part of the municipality of Monrupino, in 1986.

The club was born from the ashes of the football section of Olimpija, a club founded in the hamlet of Gabrovizza, in the Sgonico comune. In 1974, the section passed into the hands of the Kras Sports Club in Sgonico, a sports club that also had a volleyball and table tennis section. In 1986, the football section of Kras separated from the sports club and became an independent association under the presidency of Andrej Race.

The team played in Terza and Seconda Categoria until the 2004–05 season, when the club, then chaired by Domenico Centrone, won promotion to Prima Categoria. That historic result marked the beginning of a successful five-year period for the team. In the following season, Kras Repen was promoted again, winning promotion to the Promozione.

In the 2007–08 season, the club was coached by former Soviet and Belarusian international player Sergei Aleinikov. The contact was made due to the club's main sponsor, Koimpex, working with companies in Belarus. In the 2008–09 season, Kras obtained its first promotion to Eccellenza, the fifth tier of Italian football.

== Season-by-season record ==
Season	League									Cups	
Season	Division	P	W	D	L	GS	GA	Pts	Pos.	Cup	Round
2000–01	Terza Categoria								↑	Coppa Regione	
2001–02	Seconda Categoria, group D	30	13	9	8	38	27	48	6th	Coppa Regione	
2002–03	Seconda Categoria, group D	30	5	9	16	29	43	24	15th	Seconda Categoria Cup	Quarter-finals
2003–04	Seconda Categoria, group D	30	9	12	9	37	36	39	9th	Seconda Categoria Cup	First round
2004–05	Seconda Categoria, group D	29	22	5	2	75	28	71	1st ↑	Seconda Categoria Cup	Quarter-finals
2005–06	Prima Categoria, group C	30	16	10	4	57	31	58	2nd ↑	Prima Categoria Cup	Second round
2006–07	Promozione, group B	30	15	4	11	49	44	49	5th	FVG Cup	First round
2007–08	Promozione, group B	30	12	11	7	35	28	47	5th	FVG Cup	First round
2008–09	Promozione, group B	30	22	5	3	58	17	71	1st ↑	FVG Cup	First round
2009–10	Eccellenza	30	19	3	8	54	27	60	2nd ↑	FVG Cup	First round
2010–11	Serie D, group C	34	7	16	11	39	61	32	17th ↓	Serie D Cup	Second round
2011–12	Eccellenza	30	16	9	5	61	40	57	1st ↑	FVG Cup	Semi-finals
2012–13	Serie D, group C	38	8	5	25	50	34	73	19th ↓	Serie D Cup	First round
2013–14	Eccellenza	30	18	7	5	66	37	61	2nd ↑	FVG Cup	Runners-up
2014–15	Serie D, group C	34	8	9	17	41	58	44	16th ↓	Serie D Cup	Preliminary round
2015–16	Eccellenza	30	12	8	10	52	43	44	6th	FVG Cup	Quarter-finals
2016–17	Eccellenza	30	13	7	10	53	50	46	6th	FVG Cup	Quarter-finals
2017–18	Eccellenza	30	8	5	17	25	55	29	14th	FVG Cup	First round
2018–19	Eccellenza	30	8	7	15	22	36	31	13th ↓	FVG Cup	First round
2019–20	Promozione, group B	22 (Note: The season was interrupted in March 2020 due to the COVID-19 pandemic.)	15	2	5	50	31	34	3rd	Promozione Cup	Interrupted
2020–21	Promozione, group B	4 (Note: The season was interrupted in October 2020 due to the COVID-19 pandemic.)	2	1	1	11	7	7		Promozione Cup	Interrupted
2021–22	Eccellenza	22	9	3	10	29	36	30	7th	FVG Cup	First round

== Honours ==
- Eccellenza Friuli-Venezia Giulia (1st regional level)
  - Winners: 2011–12
- Promozione Friuli-Venezia Giulia (2nd regional level)
  - Winners: 2008–09
- Seconda Categoria Friuli-Venezia Giulia (4th regional level)
  - Winners: 2004–05
- Terza Categoria Friuli-Venezia Giulia (5th and lowest regional level)
  - Winners: 2000–01

== See also ==
- Slovene minority in Italy
