= Giacomo Favero =

Italian footballer

Personal information
- Date of birth: 1 January 1991 (age 35)
- Place of birth: Italy
- Position: Midfielder

Team information
- Current team: Club Eagles

Senior career*
Years	Team	Apps	(Gls)
2010–2011	Torviscosa		
2011–2012	Rimini	8	(0)
2013	Ħamrun Spartans	12	(3)
2013–2014	Floriana	8	(0)
2014	Birżebbuġa	13	(3)
2014–2015	Giorgione		
2015–2016	Ligorna		
2016	Licata		
2017	Sansovino		
2017	Mazara		
2018	Licata		
2019	Gela		
2019–2020	Pro Gorizia		
2020–2021	Eclisse Carenipievigina		
2021	Calvi Noale		
2022–	Club Eagles		
- * Club domestic league appearances and goals

Giacomo Favero (born 1 January 1991) is an Italian footballer who plays as a midfielder for Club Eagles.

== Career ==
In 2010, Favero signed for Italian fourth tier side Torviscosa. In 2011, he signed for Rimini in the Italian third tier, where he made 8 league appearances and scored 0 goals. On 10 October 2011, Favero debuted for Rimini during a 1–0 win over Alessandria. Before the second half of 2012–13, he signed for Maltese top flight club Ħamrun Spartans. Before the second half of 2013–14, he signed for Birżebbuġa in the Maltese second tier.

In 2014, Favero signed for Italian fourth tier team Giorgione. In 2016, he signed for Licata in the Italian fifth tier. Before the second half of 2018–19, he signed for Italian fourth tier outfit Gela. In 2019, Favero signed for Pro Gorizia in the Italian fifth tier. Before the 2022 season, he signed for Maldivian side Club Eagles.
