= Nuovo Pordenone 2024 FC ASD =

Italian football club

Pordenone
- Full name: Nuovo Pordenone 2024 Football Club; Associazione Sportiva Dilettantistica
- Nicknames: I Ramarri (The Green Lizards); I Neroverdi (The Black and Greens)
- Founded: 1920; 106 years ago 2024; 2 years ago (refounded)
- Ground: Stadio Ottavio Bottecchia (Pordenone)
- Capacity: 3 089
- 2025–26: Eccellenza Friuli Venezia Giulia, 2nd of 18
- Website: https://www.pordenonefc.com/
| Home colours | Away colours | Third colours |

Nuovo Pordenone 2024 FC ASD, commonly referred to as Pordenone, is a football club based in Pordenone, Friuli-Venezia Giulia, Italy.

== History ==
It was founded in 1920 as Football Club Pordenone.

In the 2007–08 season, the club was promoted from Eccellenza Friuli – Venezia Giulia to Serie D, and six seasons later (in 2014), it was promoted to the new Lega Pro. The club was relegated in 2015 but re-admitted at the start of 2015–16 Lega Pro, to fill the vacancies.

The club reached the Lega Pro play-offs for two consecutive seasons, being defeated in the semi finals by Pisa and Parma, the clubs that eventually were promoted.

On 12 December 2017, in the Round of 16, Pordenone played Inter Milan for the Coppa Italia at the San Siro, drawing 0-0 and getting knocked out 5–4 in penalties. This is the furthest the team has ever reached in the competition.

Pordenone successively won the Group B title in the 2018–19 Serie C season under the tenure of seasoned manager Attilio Tesser, thus ensuring themselves the right to play Serie B for the first time in the club's history.

The club's first season in Serie B was largely successful, achieving a fourth-place finish in the league and thus reaching the play-offs for promotion to Serie A. However, Pordenone's push for a second-consecutive promotion ended with a 2–1 aggregate defeat in the semi-final against Frosinone. In the 2020–21 season, Pordenone suffered a downturn in fortunes as the club ended the campaign in 15th position in the table, with Tesser being removed from his position as coach in April 2021 and replaced by Maurizio Domizzi. In the 2021–22 season campaign, the team finished last and was relegated to Serie C after changing three head coaches. After the 2022–23 season, Pordenone did not apply to participate in Serie C, dropped out of professional football and was liquidated on 31 October 2023.

In May 2024, the club was refounded under the new denomination of Nuovo Pordenone 2024 FC ASD and submitted an application to play in the amateur Promozione league for the 2024–25 season.

== Honours ==
- Serie C
  - Champions: 2018–19 (group B)
- Serie D
  - Champions: 2013–14
- Supercoppa di Serie C
  - Winners: 2019

== Colours and badge ==
The colours of the club are black and green, originating from the Venezia shirt. The away kit is usually predominantly white; over the years, the secondary colours have varied from green, red (evoking the same colours of the city of Pordenone banner) and black. In the past, the badge represented the city coat of arms, sometimes with a lizard; more recently, the badge was modernized with a logo representing the letters P and N, identifying the car plate of the province and three waves depicting the river Noncello.
