= ASD Lido dei Pini =

Italian football club based in Rome

Lido dei Pini
- Full name: Associazione Sportiva Dilettantesca Lido dei Pini
- Founded: 2007
- Ground: Chimenti Delio (erba); Rome, Italy; Italy
- Capacity: 200
- Manager: Ivo Monteriù
- Coach: Ivo Monteriù
- League: Terza Categoria
Home colours

Associazione Sportiva Dilettantistica Lido dei Pini (abbreviated as Lido dei Pini) is an Italian football club based in Rome.

== Background ==
A.S.D. Lido dei Pini plays in the Terza Categoria, the ninth and last level of Italian football. The club was founded in 2007. The stadium is able to accommodate 200 spectators. It is a small stadium with a synthetic playing surface and seating for 200 people. The land is located in the central part of Italy, Lazio. It is very close to the training complex of A.S. Roma.

== Season to season ==
Season	Level	Division	Section	Place	Movements
	Tier 4	Eccellenza	Serie D	3rd	
