= ASD Unione Fincantieri Monfalcone =

Italian football club

Monfalcone
- Full name: Associazione Sportiva Dilettantistica Unione Fincantieri Monfalcone
- Founded: 1912; 1994 (refounded); 2016 (refounded)
- Ground: Campo Sportivo Comunale; Monfalcone, Italy
- Capacity: 2,000
- Chairman: Rodolfo Lugli
- Manager: Alessandro Peroni
- League: Eccellenza Friuli Venezia Giulia
- 2015–16: Serie D/C, 14th (relegated after the team announced its withdrew for next season)
Home colours	Away colours

Associazione Sportiva Dilettantistica Unione Fincantieri Monfalcone (usually referred to as Monfalcone or UFM Monfalcone) is the main Italian association football club in Monfalcone (province of Gorizia, Friuli-Venezia Giulia). It currently plays in Eccellenza Friuli Venezia Giulia.

== History ==
The sports club, born in 1912 during the Austro-Hungarian dominion, started its activity after the end of World War I.

The team, already active in 1919, grew progressively until entering the Seconda Divisione of the Italian football championship, the last step before the highest national category, and it witnessed its fusion in 1923 with two other local clubs: S.C. Monfalcone and G.S. Cantiere Navale Triestino.

Unexpectedly winning the C round of Prima Divisione championship in 1929, the team was admitted to the first Serie B for 1929-1930 and for the following two seasons.

In November 1932 the great financial crisis of Cantiere Navale Triestino, the company managing the local harbour, forced the Italian team to retire after 6 days, which meant its relegation to the previous category.

Being in trouble in the period before the Second Italo-Ethiopian War, it managed to make up the lost ground and after only 3 seasons it went back playing in third level championships, which from 1935 to not long ago were called Serie C.

After interrupting the activities for warfare, in 1945 the sports club split in two: Associazione Calcio Monfalconese (ACM) and Cantieri Riuniti dell'Adriatico Monfalcone (CRDA Monfalcone). Such division did not last long and, after 7 years of individual activities, the two teams unite in the name of CRDA Monfalcone.

In 1962 Monfalcone won Serie D Championship and could therefore take part in Serie C 1962-1963; in 1968 it changed name into Associazione Calcio Monfalcone. It was relegated from Serie C at the end of 1970-71 championship and for about 20 years the team competed for championships in Serie D and Eccellenza.

In 1993 the club closed and, in 1994, a new sports club was founded with the name of Unione Sportiva Calcio Monfalcone. Starting from Terza Categoria, it shortly escalated 5 categories until being promoted, in 2002, to Serie D.

At the end of the 2010–11 Eccellenza season, the club relegated to Promozione, but decided to merge with the second team of the city, Fincantieri Calcio, in order to remain in Eccellenza and build a stronger club, taking the current name in the process.

In 2012–13 Eccellenza season, after 10 years, the club was promoted back to Serie D where it remained only for one year given that at the end of season 2013-14 it was relegated to Eccellenza. Winning the latter championship it was promoted back again to Serie D, but this did not last the next season given the economic situation of the club.

Winning 2016-17 championship in Terza Categoria, the team was promoted to Seconda Categoria.

== Colours ==
Its colours are blue and white.
