= FC Ponsacco 1920 SSD =

Italian football club

Ponsacco
- The club badge of the Italian football club F.C. Ponsacco 1920
- Full name: Federazione Calcistica Ponsacco 1920; Società Sportiva Dilettantistica
- Founded: 1920 (as l'Unione Sportiva Ponsacco); 2011 (refounded as F.C. Ponsacco 1920 S.S.D.)
- Ground: Stadio Comunale, Ponsacco, Italy
- Capacity: 3,220
- Chairman: Massimo Donati
- Manager: Luigi Pagliuca
- League: Serie D/E
- 2017-18: Serie D/E, 3rd
Home colours	Away colours

Federazione Calcistica Ponsacco 1920 S.S.D. or simply Ponsacco is an Italian association football club, based in Ponsacco, Tuscany. It currently plays in Serie D, Group E.

== History ==
In the summer 2011, after the transfer of A.S.D. Mobilieri Ponsacco Calcio to Santa Croce sull'Arno, the club was refounded as F.C. Ponsacco 1920 S.S.D. restarting from Terza Categoria Pisa and in 2013 it was promoted to Prima Categoria Toscana. From 2011 to 2013 it obtained two records, not losing for 67 consecutive games and winning all 30 games of the 2012–13 season in Seconda Categoria Tuscany.

The team played in Eccellenza Tuscany in the 2013–14 season, after buying Eccellenza's club Pisa Sporting Club A.S.D. sports title, when it was promoted to Serie D.

== Colors and badge ==
The team's color are red and blue
