= US Agropoli 1921 =

Italian football club

Agropoli
- Full name: Unione Sportiva Agropoli 1921
- Founded: 1921
- Ground: Stadio Raffaele Guariglia, Agropoli, Italy
- Capacity: 2,000
- Chairman: Domenico Cerruti
- Manager: Giuseppe Ferazzoli
- League: Serie D/I
- 2019–20: Serie D/H, 18th
- Website: www.usagropolicalcio.it
Home colours	Away colours

Unione Sportiva Agropoli 1921 is an Italian football club based in Agropoli, Campania. Currently it plays in Italy's Serie D.

== Colors and badge ==
The team's colors are white and light blue.

== Honours ==
- Eccellenza:
  - Winner (1): 2011–12
