= ASD Itala San Marco Gradisca =

Italian football club

ISM Gradisca
- Full name: Associazione Sportiva Dilettantistica Itala San Marco Gradisca
- Founded: 1919; 2010 (refounded)
- Ground: Stadio Gino Colaussi, Gradisca d'Isonzo, Italy
- Capacity: 4,000
- Chairman: Franco Bonanno
- Manager: Fabio Franti
- League: Seconda Categoria
- 2011–12: Serie D/C, 18th (relegated)
Home colours	Away colours

Associazione Sportiva Dilettantistica Itala San Marco Gradisca (usually abbreviated to I.S.M. Gradisca) is an Italian association football club located in Gradisca d'Isonzo, Friuli-Venezia Giulia. It currently plays in Seconda Categoria.

== History ==
A.S.D. Itala San Mrco Gradisca was founded in 1919 as Società Sportiva Itala di Gradisca.

=== U.S. Itala San Marco ===
In 1978 the club was renamed U.S. Itala San Marco and played in Lega Pro Seconda Divisione, after having been crowned as Serie D/C winners in 2007–08.

Following its withdrawal at the end of the 2009–10 Lega Pro Seconda Divisione season, the club was forced out of business.

=== A.S.D. I.S.M. Gradisca ===
In the summer of 2010, a new team with the current denomination was formed and was promoted from Eccellenza Friuli – Venezia Giulia to Serie D at the end of the 2010–11 season. In the season 2011–12 it was relegated to Eccellenza.

== Colors and badge ==
The team's colours are white and dark blue.
