= ASD Comunale Fontanafredda =

Italian football club

Fontanafredda
- Full name: Associazione Sportiva Dilettantistica Comunale Fontanafredda
- Nicknames: Rossoneri (red & blacks)
- Founded: 1925
- Ground: Stadio Omero Tognon, Fontanafredda, Italy
- Capacity: 5,000
- Chairman: Luca Muranella
- Manager: David Rispoli
- League: Eccellenza Friuli Venezia Giulia
- 2015–16: Serie D/C, 18th (relegated after play-off)
- Website: www.fontanafreddacalcio.com
Home colours	Away colours

Associazione Sportiva Dilettantistica Comunale Fontanafredda, commonly referred to as Fontanafredda, is an Italian football club based in Fontanafredda, Friuli-Venezia Giulia. It currently plays in Eccellenza Friuli Venezia Giulia.

== History ==
The club was founded in 1925 with the name O.N.D. Fontanafredda and in 1940 becomes Gil Fontanafredda. New name change in 1945: the team is called the Club della Fonte, and then in 1963 took the name S.S. Fontanafredda. The sporting results lead the club to climb the categories. In May 2007 the Fontanafredda executives received the gold medal for 75 years of affiliation from the highest authorities of the FIGC of Rome.
In the summer of 2013, when the club is in Eccellenza, the merger with A.S.D. Vigonovo Ranzano, which gives life to A.S.D. Comunale Fontanafreddda. The union brought good results and the Rossoneri won the championship by climbing to Serie D under the guidance of Maurizio De Pieri. The youth sector, which has long been the pride of the area, has achieved several successes at various levels. Mario Pagotto was the most successful player in the history of Fontanafredda, where he was born and raised in football. In the grande Bologna he won three league titles in the 1936–37, 1938–39 and 1940–41 seasons and played in the Vittorio Pozzo's national team.
The stadium is named after Omero Tognon. Midfielder, he played his entire career (with the exception of the last two years for FC Pordenone in the fourth serie) in AC Milan, at the turn of the forties and fifties, coming to be the captain, winning the championships of 1950-51 and 1954–55. In his career he totaled 293 matches in Serie A, scoring only two goals, the last of which earned him the draw in the derby of November 4, 1951. After ceasing his competitive activity, he began that of coach, carried out mainly in the series minors. With the shirt of the Italy national team he took part in the 1950 and 1954 world cups.

=== Serie D ===
In the season 2013–14 the team was promoted, from Eccellenza Friuli-Venezia Giulia to Serie D.

=== Recent seasons ===
Season	League									Cups	
Season	Division	P	W	D	L	F	A	Pts	Pos	Cup	Round
1972–73	Prima Categoria, group A									Coppa Italia Dilettanti	Preliminary round
1973–74	Prima Categoria, group A								1st ↑	Coppa Italia Dilettanti	1st round
1974–75	Promozione	30	15	12	3	37	18	42	1st	Coppa Italia Dilettanti	1st round
1975–76	Promozione	30	11	14	5	40	28	36	4th	Coppa Italia Dilettanti	2nd round
1976–77	Promozione	30	15	9	6	47	29	39	3rd	Coppa Italia Dilettanti	2nd round
1977–78	Promozione	30	15	11	4	28	17	41	3rd	Coppa Italia Dilettanti	1st round
1978–79	Promozione	30	11	10	9	39	37	30	5th	Coppa Italia Dilettanti	3rd round
1979–80	Promozione	30	13	9	8	40	28	35	4th	Coppa Italia Dilettanti	2nd round
1980–81	Promozione	30	9	12	9	24	25	35	8th	Coppa Italia Dilettanti	2nd round
1981–82	Promozione	30	13	11	6	39	24	37	5th	Coppa Italia Dilettanti	1st round
1982–83	Promozione	30	13	8	9	34	26	34	5th	Coppa Italia Dilettanti	1st round
1983–84	Promozione	30	10	12	8	20	18	32	7th	Coppa Italia Dilettanti	2nd round
1984–85	Promozione	30	18	10	2	45	18	46	1st ↑	Coppa Italia Dilettanti	1st round
1985–86	Interregionale, group C	30	8	14	8	24	27	30	9th	Coppa Italia Dilettanti	1st round
1986–87	Interregionale, group D	30	5	11	14	20	34	21	14th ↓	Coppa Italia Dilettanti	?
1987–88	Promozione	30	10	12	8	41	36	32	6th	Coppa Italia Dilettanti	1st round
1988–89	Promozione	30	14	12	4	47	29	40	1st ↑	Coppa Italia Dilettanti	2nd round
1989–90	Interregionale, group D	34	8	13	13	21	32	29	15th ↓	Coppa Italia Dilettanti	2nd round
1990–91	Promozione	30	12	12	6	36	25	36	4th	Coppa Italia Dilettanti	1st round
1991–92	Eccellenza	30	15	10	5	46	18	40	3rd	FVG Cup	Quarters
1992–93	Eccellenza	34	13	10	7	39	21	36	4th	FVG Cup	1st round
1993–94	Eccellenza	30	9	12	9	28	23	30	8th	FVG Cup	Runners-up
1994–95	Eccellenza	30	3	13	14	23	44	19	16th ↓	FVG Cup	1st round
1995–96	Eccellenza	30	9	13	8	30	28	40	8th	FVG Cup	1st round
1996–97	Promozione, group A	30	12	9	9	41	27	45	6th	FVG Cup	2nd round
1997–98	Promozione, group A	30	8	11	11	31	36	35	10th	FVG Cup	2nd round
1998–99	Promozione, group A	30	16	7	7	31	20	55	2nd ↑	FVG Cup	2nd round
1999–00	Eccellenza	30	9	12	9	28	25	39	7th	FVG Cup	1st round
2000–01	Eccellenza	30	9	7	14	37	47	34	14th ↓	FVG Cup	1st round
2001–02	Promozione, group A	30	12	12	6	48	30	48	7th	FVG Cup	1st round
2002–03	Promozione, group A	28	14	11	3	36	17	53	1st ↑	Promozione Cup	Quarters
2003–04	Eccellenza	32	5	9	18	36	50	24	17th ↓	FVG Cup	Runners-up
2004–05	Promozione, group A	30	14	8	8	42	38	50	5th	FVG Cup	1st round
2005–06	Promozione, group A	30	17	6	7	57	34	35	3rd ↑	FVG Cup	2nd round
2006–07	Eccellenza	30	7	9	14	29	47	30	14th ↓	FVG Cup	1st round
2007–08	Promozione, group A	30	16	9	5	59	29	57	1st ↑	FVG Cup	1st round
2008–09	Eccellenza	30	10	8	12	34	37	38	9th	FVG Cup	Runners-up
2009–10	Eccellenza	30	10	10	10	29	24	40	8th	FVG Cup	1st round
2010–11	Eccellenza	32	18	7	7	52	33	61	2nd	FVG Cup	Winners
2010–11	Eccellenza	32	18	7	7	52	33	61	2nd	Coppa Italia Dilettanti	Quarters
2011–12	Eccellenza	30	17	5	8	46	30	56	2nd	FVG Cup	Quarters
2012–13	Eccellenza	32	12	9	11	50	41	45	5th	FVG Cup	Eighters
2013–14	Eccellenza	30	19	7	4	50	26	64	1st ↑	FVG Cup	Quarters
2014–15	Serie D, group C	34	12	8	14	50	49	44	10th	Serie D Cup	Preliminary round
2015–16	Serie D, group C	38	8	15	15	44	62	34	18th ↓	Serie D Cup	1st round
2016–17	Eccellenza	30	14	8	8	49	38	50	4th	FVG Cup	Quarters
2017–18	Eccellenza	30	10	5	15	34	41	35	12th	FVG Cup	1st round
2018–19	Eccellenza	30	8	4	18	28	49	28	14th	FVG Cup	Quarters
2019–20	Eccellenza	22	9	7	6	39	28	34	7th	FVG Cup	Quarters
2020–21	Eccellenza									FVG Cup	Interrupted
Source: Messaggero Veneto – Giornale del Friuli

=== Key ===
1st	2nd	↑	↓
Champions	Runners-up	Promoted	Relegated

- Top regional leagues in Friuli-Venezia Giulia (FVG) :
  - 1959–1969 Prima Categoria (2 groups)
  - 1969–1991 Promozione (1 group)
  - 1991–today Eccellenza (1 group)
- Serie D name changes :
  - 1959–1981 Serie D (more groups)
  - 1981–1992 Interregionale (more groups)
  - 1992–2000 Campionato Nazionale Dilettanti (CND) (more groups)
  - 2000-today Serie D (more groups)

== Honours ==
- Eccellenza Friuli-Venezia Giulia (1st regional level)

Winners: 1974–75, 1984–85, 1988–89, 2013–14

- Promozione Friuli-Venezia Giulia (2nd regional level)

Winners: 1973–74, 2002–03, 2007–08

- Coppa Italia Dilettanti Friuli-Venezia Giulia

Winners: 2010–11

== Colors and badge ==
The team's colors are red and black for home games and white and red for away games.
