= Lega Nazionale Dilettanti =

Football organization in Italy

- Lega Nazionale Dilettanti
- Abbreviation: LND
- Founded: 2 August 1959; 67 years ago
- Headquarters: Rome
- Region served: Italy
- Products: Serie D Eccellenza; Promozione; Prima Categoria; Seconda Categoria; Terza Categoria; Coppa Italia Serie D Coppa Italia Dilettanti other regional cups
- Members: more than 14,000
- President: Giancarlo Abete
- Parent organization: FIGC
- Website: lnd.it

The Lega Nazionale Dilettanti (English: Amateurs National League) is the league which runs amateur football of Italian Football Federation (FIGC) in Italy.

Founded on 2 August 1959 in Rome, it has many leagues inside: a national league, the Inter-regional Committee, which organizes the Serie D championship from 1981, 19 regional leagues organized by 20 Regional Committees (Piedmont and Aosta Valley shared the same committee; South Tyrol and Trentino has its own committee but same regional league), the Women Football Division, and the Futsal Division.

== Men competitions ==
=== International titles ===
- Coppa Ottorino Barassi (1968–1976)

=== National titles ===
- Scudetto Serie D (since 1992–1993)
- Coppa Italia Serie D (since 1999–2000)
- Coppa Italia Dilettanti (since 1966–1967)
- Scudetto Dilettanti (1957–1962, Finals between Regional Champions)

=== Interregional leagues ===
- Serie D (since 1981–82)

=== Regional leagues ===
- Eccellenza (since 1991–92)
- Promozione (since 1952–53)
- Prima Categoria
- Seconda Categoria
- Terza Categoria

== Regional Committees ==
- Abruzzo
- Apulia
- Basilicata
- Calabria
- Campania
- Emilia – Romagna
- Friuli – Venezia Giulia
- Lazio
- Liguria
- Lombardy
- Marche
- Molise
- Piedmont & Aosta Valley
- Sardinia
- Sicily
- South Tyrol
- Tuscany
- Trentino
- Umbria
- Veneto
