= Pradamano =

Pradamano Pradaman (Friulian)
- Comune
- Comune di Pradamano
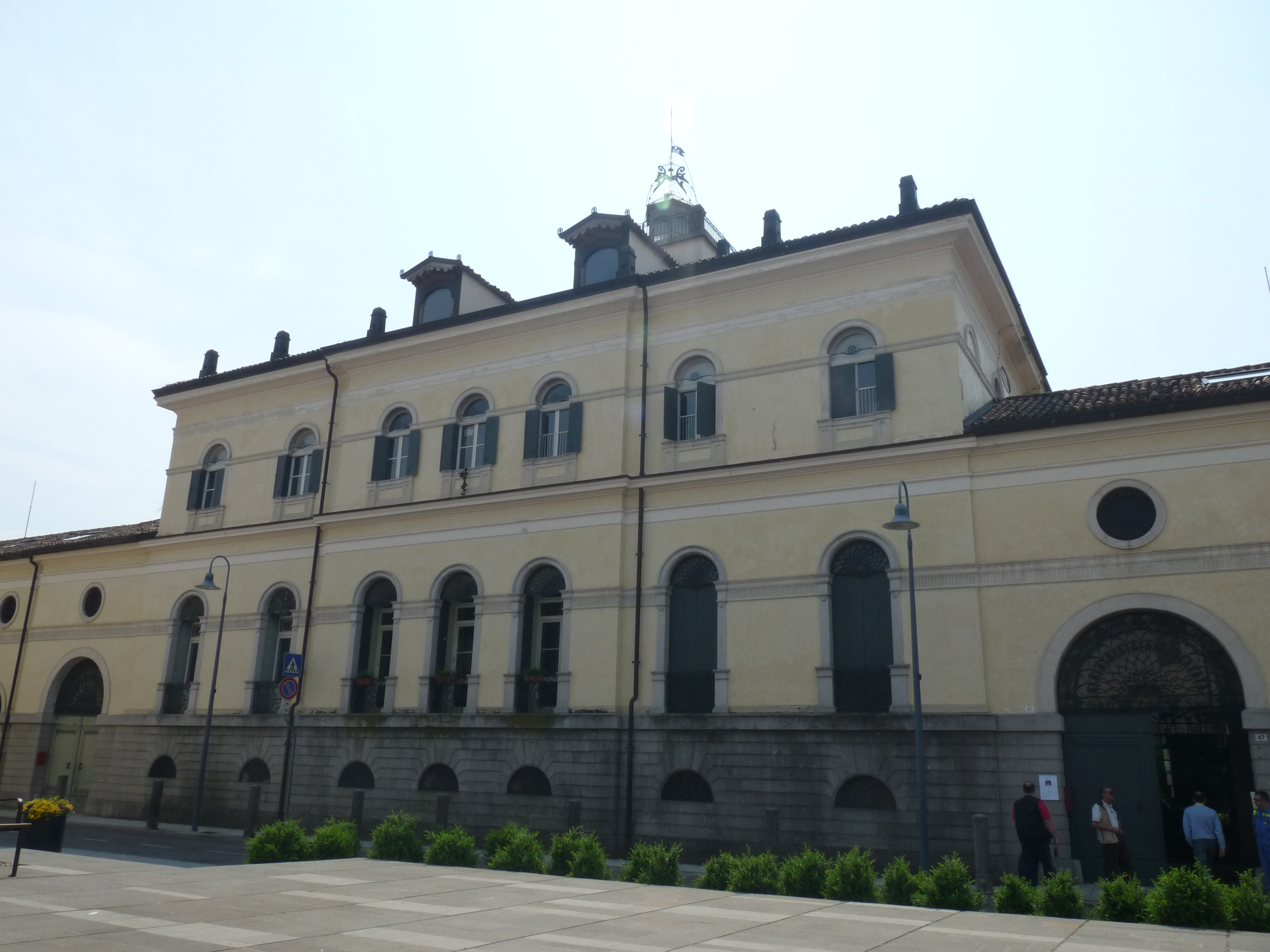
- Villa Giacomelli in Pradamano

- Location within Italy Location within Friuli-Venezia Giulia
- Coordinates: 46°2′N 13°18′E
- Country: Italy
- Region: Friuli-Venezia Giulia
- Province: Udine (UD)
- Frazioni: Lovaria

Government
  - Mayor: Enrico Mossenta

Area
  - Total: 16 km^{2} (6.2 sq mi)
- Elevation: 96 m (315 ft)

Population (2004)
  - Total: 2,972
  - Density: 190/km^{2} (480/sq mi)
- Demonym: Pradamanesi
- Time zone: UTC+1 (CET)
  - Summer (DST): UTC+2 (CEST)
- Postal code: 33040
- Dialing code: 0432
- Patron saint: Saint Cecilia
- Saint day: November 22
- Website: Official website

Pradamano (Friulian: Pradaman) is a town and comune (municipality) in the Regional decentralization entity of Udine in Friuli-Venezia Giulia, north-eastern Italy.

== Twin towns ==
Pradamano is twinned with:

- Bad Bleiberg, Austria
