= ASD Torviscosa =

Italian football club

- Full name: Associazione Sportiva Dilettantistica Torviscosa
- Nickname(s): –
- Founded: 1940
- Ground: Stadio Beppino Tonello, Torviscosa, Italy
- Capacity: 3,000
- League: Eccellenza Friuli – Venezia Giulia
- 2010–11: Serie D/C, 18th (relegated)
Home colours	Away colours

Associazioen Sportiva Dilettantistica Torviscosa is an Italian association football club located in Torviscosa, Friuli-Venezia Giulia.

In the season 2010–11, from Serie D group C relegated to Eccellenza Friuli – Venezia Giulia.

Its colors are white and blue.
