= ASD Sacilese Calcio =

Italian football club

Sacilese
- Full name: Associazione Sportiva Dilettantistica Sacilese Calcio
- Founded: 1920
- Ground: Stadio XXV Aprile – Aldo Castenetto, Sacile, Italy
- Capacity: 2,600
- Chairman: Claudio Salvador
- Manager: Ezio Meneghin
- League: Prima Categoria
- 2015–16: Serie D/C, 20th (relegated)
Home colours	Away colours

Associazione Sportiva Dilettantistica Sacilese Calcio is an Italian association football club located in Sacile, Friuli-Venezia Giulia. It currently plays in Prima Categoria.

== History ==
The club was founded in 1920.

=== From 2006–07 to 2009–10 ===
In the 2006–07 Serie D season, the team ended 8th in Girone C. A year later, in the 2007–08 Serie D season, the team placed 4th in the same division. It qualified for the promotional playoffs but lost in the first round.

In the 2008–09 Serie D season, Sacilese placed 1st in Girone C, achieving direct promotion to Lega Pro Seconda Divisione.

In the 2009–10 Lega Pro Seconda Divisione season, Sacilese placed 11th in Girone B.

=== 2010–11: relegated to Serie D after play-out ===
At the end of the 2010–11 Lega Pro Seconda Divisione season, Sacilese was ranked in 15th place with 27 points, with a record of 5 victories, 12 draws and 15 defeats, preceding Sanremese for the direct matches. The placement forced the two teams to play the relegation play-offs.

The first match was played in Sanremo on 22 May, the return at home on 29 May 2011. Sacilese lost the away match 2–1 and drew 1–1 at home, therefore relegating them to Serie D.

== Colors and badge ==
Its colors are white and red.
