= ASD Polisportiva Tamai =

Italian football club

Tamai
- Full name: Associazione Sportiva Dilettantistica Polisportiva Tamai
- Founded: 1973
- Ground: Stadio Comunale, Brugnera, Italy
- Capacity: 1,140
- Chairman: Tommaso Elia Verardo
- Manager: Giuseppe Bianchini
- League: Serie D/C
- 2017–18: 13th
Home colours	Away colours

Associazione Sportiva Dilettantistica Polisportiva Tamai is an Italian association football club located in Tamai, a frazione of Brugnera, Friuli-Venezia Giulia. It currently plays in Serie D.

== History ==
The club was founded in 1973.

In the season 2000–01 it was promoted for the first time in Serie D.

== Colors and badge ==
Its colors are white and red.
