= Terza Categoria =

Lowest level of amateur football in Italy

- Organising body: Lega Nazionale Dilettanti
- Founded: 1959
- Country: Italy
- Confederation: UEFA
- Divisions: 232
- Number of clubs: 1901
- Level on pyramid: 9
- Promotion to: Seconda Categoria
- Website: www.lnd.it

The Terza Categoria is the lowest level of amateur football in Italy. It is the ninth level in the Italian football league system. Each individual league winner within the Terza Categoria level progresses to their closest regional league in the Seconda Categoria level. Unlike all the levels above the Terza Categoria, there is no relegation.

This level of Italian football is completely amateur and is run on a provincial level from the Local and Provincial Committees. It is also the only Italian football division where head coaches are not requested to own any license released by the federation.

In theory, this is the final league in Italy from which a team can rise the ranks and eventually become Serie A champions.

== Birth of Terza Categoria ==
Because of the birth of the Lega Nazionale Dilettanti (Amateur League) in 1959, Seconda Divisione (literally Second Division), was converted into the Terza Categoria (literally Third Category).

With the reform of the Lega Pro before the 2014–15 season in which the Lega Pro Prima Divisione and Lega Pro Seconda Divisione were unified restoring Serie C as the new third national level, the championship became the ninth national level, but remained the fifth and lowest regional competition.

== See also ==
- Italian football league system
