= Prima Categoria =

Italian association football league

- Organising body: Lega Nazionale Dilettanti
- Founded: 1959
- Country: Italy
- Confederation: UEFA
- Divisions: 105
- Number of clubs: 1,680
- Level on pyramid: 1 (1898–1922); 7 (since 2014)
- Promotion to: Promozione
- Relegation to: Seconda Categoria
- Website: www.lnd.it

The Prima Categoria is the seventh level (since 2014–15) in the Italian football league system and is organized by the National Amateur League by the Regional Committees. Each individual league winner within the Prima Categoria level progresses to their closest regional league in the Promozione level. Depending on each league's local rules, a number of teams each year are relegated from each league, to the eighth level of Italian football, the Seconda Categoria.

This level of Italian football is completely amateur and is run on a regional level.

From 1898–1922, the highest league in Italy was named the Prima Categoria, the predecessor to the later Prima Divisione and current Serie A. That Prima Categoria has no relation to the one of today, which was founded in 1959.

== History ==
Originally, the Prima Categoria was the equivalent of the Serie A, until 1922 this was in fact the official name of the Italian top division. As today, it was run by the Regional Committees so it did not have a predefined structure. A variable number of teams (generally 16 or 18) progressed to the national phase run by the FIGC itself. When this amateur system did not match the interests of the growing richest clubs of the Northern industrialized part of the country, they left the FIGC to create their private super league, the Northern League, the ancestor of actual Lega Serie A. After a year of talks, the clubs agreed to come back to the FIGC and the Prima Categoria was abolished and divided in two separate leagues, the Prima Divisione for the greatest teams and the Seconda Divisione for the others.

== Features ==
Established recently in 1959, is organized by regional committees of the FIGC, and therefore does not have a predefined structure. The number of rounds in which the league is at the regional level varies, as does the number of teams participating in each league, today www.datasport.it seconds (source) teams in the first category are 1686.

== Promotion ==
The promoted teams go in and promotion are the winners of their group. Varies from region to region, there is a mechanism that allows the playoffs to winning teams to be included in a list that would result (in case of vacancies) in Promozione.

== Relegation ==
The reduction relegated to the Seconda Categoria.

== Prima Categoria by region ==
- Prima Categoria Abruzzo - 5 Divisions
- Prima Categoria Basilicata - 2 Divisions
- Prima Categoria Calabria - 4 Divisions
- Prima Categoria Campania - 7 Divisions
- Prima Categoria Emilia–Romagna - 8 Divisions
- Prima Categoria Friuli – Venezia Giulia - 3 Divisions
- Prima Categoria Lazio - 9 Divisions
- Prima Categoria Liguria - 4 Divisions
- Prima Categoria Lombardia - 12 Divisions
- Prima Categoria Marche - 4 Divisions
- Prima Categoria Molise - 3 Divisions
- Prima Categoria Piemonte and Aosta Valley - 8 Divisions
- Prima Categoria Puglia - 3 Divisions
- Prima Categoria Sardegna - 5 Divisions
- Prima Categoria Sicilia - 21 Divisions
- Prima Categoria Toscana - 6 Divisions
- Prima Categoria Trentino-Alto Adige/Südtirol - 3 Divisions
- Prima Categoria Umbria - 3 Divisions
- Prima Categoria Veneto - 8 Divisions

== See also ==
- Italian football league system
- Italian Football Championship
- Prima Divisione
