= Messaggero Veneto =

Italian local daily newspaper

- Front page, 31 May 2009
- Type: Daily newspaper
- Owner(s): Nord Est Multimedia
- Founded: 24 May 1946; 79 years ago
- Language: Italian
- Headquarters: Udine, Italy
- Circulation: 24,000 (2024)
- Website: Messaggero Veneto

Messaggero Veneto (lit. 'Venetian Messenger'), whose subtitle is Giornale del Friuli (lit. 'Newspaper of Friuli'), is an Italian local daily newspaper, based in Udine. It has the largest readership in Friuli-Venezia Giulia. The Monday edition is called Messaggero del Lunedì.

== History and profile ==
It was founded in 1946 when Friuli was still part of Veneto and Venezia Giulia was claimed by the Socialist Federal Republic of Yugoslavia. It was acquired by GEDI Gruppo Editoriale in 1998 and ceded to Nord Est Multimedia in 2023. The newspaper has its headquarters in Udine.

Messaggero Veneto had a circulation of over 50,000 copies in 2008, while it was reduced to around 26,000 in 2023.
