= Seconda Categoria =

Italian association football league

- Organising body: Lega Nazionale Dilettanti
- Founded: 1959
- Country: Italy
- Confederation: UEFA
- Divisions: 182
- Number of clubs: 2,912
- Level on pyramid: 8
- Promotion to: Prima Categoria
- Relegation to: Terza Categoria
- Website: www.lnd.it

The Seconda Categoria is the 8th level (since 2014–15) in the Italian football league system. Each individual league winner within the Seconda Categoria level progresses to their closest regional league in the Prima Categoria level. Depending on each league's local rules, a number of teams each year are relegated from each league, to the 9th level of Italian football, the Terza Categoria.

This level of Italian football is completely amateur and is run on a regional level by a Regional Committee (Comitato Regionale).

The top-placed teams in each group move to the Prima Categoria, while the last-place finisher drops to the Terza Categoria. Play-offs and play-outs are expected to be held, usually on the condition that there are no gaps of no more than 7 points.

In all Seconda Categoria matches, except in cases of absolute necessity, the competent technical body of the Italian Referees Association, often the OTS, designates only the referee. The role of assistant referee is covered by a member of each of the clubs participating in the match. Only in some events and tournaments, especially the semi-finals and finals, does the competent technical body also designate the federal assistants and, sometimes, even the fourth official.

== History ==
In the past, from 1904 since 1912, had been the 2nd level of Italian local regional tournaments in which main teams used to field apprentices and reserves. New teams entering F.I.F. (Italian Football Federation, was the old name of Italian Football Federation (F.I.G.C.) until 1909) were added to this championships.

In February 1912 in Turin, some F.I.G.C. federal counsellors started elaborating a new rule introducing promotions and relegations from Seconda Categoria to Prima Categoria. This new rule was set during the July 1912 federal annual meeting so that this category changed name into Promozione because winning teams were awarded "promotion" to upper level.

This category name too was given to the second level of youth tournaments in 1919 when created by a new local and independent federation called U.L.I.C. (Unione Libera Italiana del Calcio) which was set in Milan in 1917. Later entered the main Italian federation system F.I.G.C. in 1927 and had been in use up to 1947 at local committees. Despite Regional F.I.G.C. championships and tournaments U.L.I.C. was birth date limited (not yet 21 years' old).

Unused for a long time by the F.I.G.C. just because most of lower federal categories got another name (Division), got back in 1959 because of birth of the "Amateur League" (Italian: Lega Nazionale Dilettanti) and all "Divisions" (Divisioni in Italian) were converted into "Categories" (Categorie in Italian) and First Division (Prima Divisione) become Seconda Categoria.

With the reform of the Lega Pro before the 2014–2015 season in which the Lega Pro Prima Divisione and Lega Pro Seconda Divisione were unified restoring Serie C as the new third national level, the championship became the eighth national level, but remained the fourth highest regional competition.

== See also ==
- Italian football league system
