= Promozione =

Italian association football league

- Organising body: Lega Nazionale Dilettanti
- Founded: 1912
- Country: Italy
- Confederation: UEFA
- Divisions: 53
- Number of clubs: 868
- Level on pyramid: 6
- Promotion to: Eccellenza
- Relegation to: Prima Categoria
- League cup: Coppa Italia Dilettanti
- Website: http://www.lnd.it

The Promozione ([promotˈtsjoːne], "promotion") is the sixth level in the Italian football league system. Each individual league winner within the Promozione level progresses to their closest regional league in the Eccellenza level. Depending on each league's local rules, a number of teams each year are relegated from each league, to the 7th level of Italian football, the Prima Categoria. This level of Italian football is completely amateur and is run on a regional level.

== History in brief ==
In the past, from 1904 to 1912, the Seconda Categoria had been the second level of Italian local regional tournaments in which main teams used to field apprentices and reserves. New teams entering F.I.F. (Italian Football Federation; FIF was the old name of F.I.G.C. up to 1909) were added to those championships.

In February 1912 some new Federal Members of F.I.G.C. started elaborating a new rule adding promotions and relegations from Seconda Categoria to Prima Categoria.
This new rule got approved during the July 1912 federal annual meeting so that this category changed name into Promozione because winning teams were awarded "promotion" to upper level.
The "Promozione" had been played in F.I.G.C. tournaments up to season 1921–22 when new rules and changes set in widening league categories from 3 to 4.

In 1922 "Promozione" was still top regional level and new rules didn't change that situation: Third Division (in Italian = Terza Divisione) took the place of "Promozione" so that up to 1948–49 no other championship got that name.

In 1948 level 3 (Serie C) had to be reduced because overdimensioned.
Run by three interregional leagues (North, Centre and South) with different numbers of sections and teams attending, their teams were asked from Federation to be massively relegated to the regional leagues. Their opposition caused the constitution of another level between Serie C and top regional league Prima Divisione (Italian for First Division). They called it Promozione (Sponsorship League). It lasted until season 1951–52 when it had to be demoted to top regional category and renamed as "Promozione Regionale" (Regional Sponsorship League).

The "Promozione Regionale" had been renamed "Campionato Nazionale Dilettanti" at beginning of season 1957–58 and lasted two years when, after completing the new rules about "amateurs" leagues, at birth of Lega Nazionale Dilettanti (1959) this category was renamed as Prima Categoria.

In 1967 a new project was started from Lombardy Regional Committee. It was the introduction of a top-level "amateurs" (now Eccellenza) by reducing the sections composing the Prima Categoria. F.I.G.C. gave again this top regional level the old name "Promozione". This category now is the second level of regional amateur leagues (change was made at beginning of season 1991–92).

With the reform of the Pro League before the 2014–2015 season in which the Lega Pro Prima Divisione and Lega Pro Seconda Divisione were unified restoring Serie C as the new third national level, the championship became the sixth national level, but remained the second highest regional competition.

== Promozione by region ==
- Promozione Abruzzo – 2 Division
- Promozione Basilicata – 1 Division
- Promozione Calabria – 2 Divisions
- Promozione Campania – 4 Divisions
- Promozione Emilia-Romagna – 4 Divisions
- Promozione Friuli-Venezia Giulia – 2 Divisions
- Promozione Lazio – 4 Divisions
- Promozione Liguria – 2 Divisions
- Promozione Lombardia – 6 Divisions
- Promozione Marche – 2 Divisions
- Promozione Molise – 1 Division
- Promozione Piemonte and Aosta Valley – 4 Divisions
- Promozione Puglia – 2 Divisions
- Promozione Sardegna – 2 Divisions
- Promozione Sicilia – 4 Divisions
- Promozione Toscana – 3 Divisions
- Promozione Trentino-Alto Adige/Südtirol – 2 Divisions
- Promozione Umbria – 2 Divisions
- Promozione Veneto – 4 Divisions
