= 2010–11 Serie D =

Serie D
- Season: 2010–11

The 2010–11 Serie D was the sixty-third edition of the top level Italian non-professional football championship. It represented the fifth tier in the Italian football league system. It originally consisted of 166 teams, with two divisions allocated 20 teams each while the other seven allocated 18 teams. After the first matchday, another team was added, increasing the number of teams to 167 and Girone I to 19 teams.

Each team played two matches against every other team in its own division; a total of 34 matches for the six divisions of 18 teams, 36 matches for the 19-team Girone I, and 38 matches for the 20-team Girone A & F.

== Promotions ==
The nine division winners and the winner of play off are automatically promoted to Lega Pro Seconda Divisione 2011–12.

On April 10, 2011 Perugia became the first team to be promoted from Serie D in the season, winning the Girone E with three weeks remaining in the schedule, after a 3–2 home victory over Castel Rigone.

This was followed one week later by Cuneo and Mantova that won Girone A and B respectively.

On May 1, 2011 Treviso, Borgo a Buggiano, Santarcangelo, Arzanese won Girone C, D, F and H respectively.

On May 8, 2011 Aprilia and Ebolitana won Girone G and I respectively.

On June 25, 2011 Rimini was also promoted as the winner of the play off.

== Playoffs ==
Teams placed second through fifth in each division enter a playoff tournament after the regular season where, eventually, three of the four semi-finalists of the final phase emerge. The fourth semi-finalist is the winner (or the final loser if the winner is already promoted) of Coppa Italia Serie D. A final match, between the winners of the semifinals, determines which team finishes first and which teams comes in second in this 37-team playoff. Eventually these teams may be included up to Lega Pro Seconda Divisione if one or more current teams runs into financial difficulties and so are not admitted in this league.

== Relegations Playout ==
- In Gironi B-C-D-E-G-H of 18 teams, the two last-placed teams (17th and 18th) are relegated directly.

Teams ranked 13th to 16th play a two-legged playout (13th vs 16th, and 14th vs 15th) where to two losers are also relegated. If the 13th-placed is more than 8 points ahead of the 16th-placed team and/or the 14th-placed team is more than 8 points ahead of the 15th-placed team, then in each case, no playout is played and the lower-classified team is relegated directly.

- In Girone I of 19 teams, the two last-placed teams (18th and 19th) are relegated directly. The same playout rules as above apply, however the teams involved are placed 14th, 15th, 16th and 17th.
- In Gironi A–F' of 20 teams, the two last-placed teams (19th and 20th) are relegated directly. The same playout rules as above apply, however the teams involved are placed 15th, 16th, 17th and 18th.

The two losers of the playout are relegated to Eccellenza, while the two winners remain in Serie D. In total, 36 teams are relegated to Eccellenza.

== Tie-Breakers ==
If, during the regular season, two teams finish in an aggregate tie for first, fifth, or in a position where only one team is directly relegated or only one team must play in the playouts, then a tie breaker will be scheduled on neutral ground.

== Scudetto Dilettanti ==
The nine division winners enter a tournament to determine the over-all Serie D champion and is awarded the Scudetto Dilettanti.

In this season the winner was Cuneo.

== Events ==
=== Start of season ===
Given a normal season where there are no team failures and special promotions, Serie D would feature 9 teams that had been relegated from Lega Pro Seconda Divisione, 36 teams that had been promoted from Eccellenza, and 117 teams had played in Serie D the year before. Due to twenty-one bankruptcies and non-admissions in the professional leagues above Serie D and five bankruptcies or promotions to fill vacancies in Serie D, the 2010–11 season was to feature only 1 team that played in 2009–10 Lega Pro Seconda Divisione, 45 teams that played in 2009–10 Eccellenza, 1 team that played in Promozione 2009–10 and 115 teams that played in 2009–10 Serie D. The league also admitted four of the teams that had failed in the senior leagues. Mantova (Girone B), which played in 2009–10 Serie B, Arezzo (Girone E), Perugia (Girone E) and Rimini (Girone F) which all played in 2009–10 Lega Pro Prima Divisione. The league admitted twenty teams from Eccellenza to fill vacancies created. These teams are:

- Derthona which finished 16th in Serie D 2009–10 Girone A
- Fiorenzuola which finished 14th in Serie D 2009–10 Girone B
- Montecchio Maggiore which finished 20th in Serie D 2009–10 Girone C
- Castel San Pietro which finished 17th in Serie D 2009–10 Girone D
- Monteriggioni which finished 15th in Serie D 2009–10 Girone E
- Sporting Terni which finished 16th in Serie D 2009–10 Girone E
- Arzachena which finished 16th in Serie D 2009–10 Girone G
- Bacoli Sibilla which 15th finished in Serie D 2009–10 Girone H
- ASD Francavilla which finished 18th in Serie D 2009–10 Girone H
- Santhià which finished 2nd in Eccellenza Piemonte - Valle D'Aosta 2009–10 Girone A and was eliminated in the national playoff
- Castelnuovo Sandrà which finished 2nd in Eccellenza Veneto 2009–10 Girone A and was eliminated in the national playoff
- Novese which finished 2nd in Eccellenza Piemonte - Valle D'Aosta 2009–10-Girone B and was eliminated in the national playoff
- Voluntas Spoleto which finished 3rd in Eccellenza Umbria 2009–10 and was eliminated in the national playoff
- Jesina which finished 4th in Eccellenza Marche 2009–10 and was eliminated in the national playoff
- Camaiore which finished 5th in Eccellenza Toscana 2009–10-Girone A and was eliminated in the national playoff
- Virtus Pavullese which finished 2nd in Eccellenza Emilia-Romagna 2009–10 Girone A and was eliminated in the national playoff
- Castiadas which finished 4th in Eccellenza Sardegna 2009–10 and was eliminated in the national playoff
- Arzanese which finished 3rd in Eccellenza Campania 2009–10 Girone A and was eliminated in the national playoff
- Noto which finished 2nd in Eccellenza Sicilia 2009–10 Girone B and was eliminated in the national playoff
- Treviso which finished 7th in Eccellenza Veneto 2009–10 Girone B
- Gallaratese which finished 8th in Promozione Lombardia 2009–10 Girone A and merged with F.B.C. Saronno in order to play in Serie D.
- After the first match day Real Nocera (formerly Vis Nocera Superiore), which finished 3rd in Eccellenza Campania 2009–10 Girone B and was eliminated in the national playoff, was also admitted.

== Standings ==
=== Girone A ===
==== Teams ====
Teams from Aosta Valley, Piedmont, Liguria, & Lombardy

Club	City	Stadium	Capacity	2009–10 season
A.S.D. Acqui 1911	Acqui Terme	Stadio Jona Ottolenghi	1,500	6th in Serie D Girone A
A.S.D. Albese Calcio	Alba	Stadio San Cassiano	2,050	4th in Serie D Girone A
A.S.D. Aquanera Comollo Novi	Novi Ligure	Stadio Costante Girardengo	3,000	10th in Serie D Girone A
A.C.D. Asti	Asti	Stadio Censin Bosia	6,000	1st in Eccellenza Piedmont Girone B
Borgorosso Arenzano P.D.	Arenzano	Stadio Ferruccio Chittolina (Vado Ligure)	2,000	8th in Serie D Girone A
Borgosesia Calcio	Borgosesia	Stadio Comunale (Borgosesia)	2,500	16th in Serie D Girone A
A.S.D. Chiavari Calcio Caperana	Chiavari	Stadio Comunale (Chiavari)	2,300	2nd in Eccellenza Liguria Girone Girone A
A.S.D.C. Chieri 1955	Chieri	Stadio Piero De Paoli	2,250	12th in Serie D Girone A
A.C. Cuneo 1905	Cuneo	Fratelli Paschiero	4,000	11th in Serie D Girone A
Derthona F.B.C. 1908	Tortona	Stadio Fausto Coppi	3,500	16th in Serie D Girone A
S.G. Gallaratese A.S.D.	Gallarate	Stadio Atleti Azzurri d'Italia (Gallarate)	1,320	8th in Promozione Lombardy Girone A (merged with Saronno)
U.S.D. Lavagnese 1919	Lavagna	Stadio Edoardo Riboli	800	7th in Serie D Girone A
U.S.D. Novese	Novi Ligure	Stadio Costante Girardengo	3,500	2nd in Eccellenza Piedmont Girone B
A.C.D. Rivoli	Rivoli	Stadio Giuseppe Vavassori	1,000	14th in Serie D Girone A
A.S.D. Santhià Calcio	Santhià	Stadio Pairotto	500	2nd in Eccellenza Piedmont Girone A
A.S.D. Sarzanese Calcio 1906	Sarzana	Stadio Miro Luperi	4,500	5th in Serie D Girone A
U.S.D. 1913 Seregno Calcio	Seregno	Stadio Ferruccio	3,700	1st in Eccellenza Lombardy Girone B
S.S.D. Settimo Calcio	Settimo Torinese	Stadio Renzo Valla	400	9th in Serie D Girone A
A.S.D. Vallée d’Aoste Saint-Christophe	Saint-Christophe	Stadio Comunale (Saint-Christophe)	2,020	1st in Eccellenza Piedmont and Aosta Valley Girone A
Vigevano Calcio	Vigevano	Stadio Dante Merlo	3,000	13th in Serie D Girone A

==== League table ====
Pos	Team	Pld	W	D	L	GF	GA	GD	Pts	Promotion or relegation
1	Cuneo (C, P)	38	24	10	4	87	44	+43	82	Promotion to Lega Pro Seconda Divisione (Note: Cuneo won the Scudetto Dilettanti 2010–11.)
2	V.d.A. Saint-Christophe	38	22	7	9	63	41	+22	73	Qualification for wild card playoff
3	Asti	38	22	7	9	66	43	+23	73	Qualification for wild card playoff
4	Aquanera	38	18	12	8	65	41	+24	66	Qualification for wild card playoff
5	Seregno	38	17	12	9	52	35	+17	63	Qualification for wild card playoff
6	Santhià	38	16	11	11	44	33	+11	59 (Note: Albese and Santhià will be docked 3 points in the next season.)	
7	Gallaratese	38	15	12	11	49	38	+11	57	
8	Lavagnese	38	16	9	13	49	43	+6	57	
9	Borgosesia	38	15	12	11	46	43	+3	57	
10	Acqui	38	14	11	13	37	38	−1	53	
11	Sarzanese (D, R, R, R, R)	38	13	13	12	44	43	+1	52	Relegation to Seconda Categoria (Note: Sarzanese renounced their participation expressly in Serie D 2011–12 and were relegated to Seconda Categoria.)
12	Chiavari Caperana	38	15	6	17	54	62	−8	51	
13	Chieri	38	13	11	14	52	52	0	50	
14	Novese	38	13	9	16	48	50	−2	48	
15	Derthona	38	11	13	14	54	51	+3	46	
16	Rivoli (R)	38	11	11	16	42	63	−21	44	Qualification for Relegation playoff
17	Albese	38	9	11	18	40	52	−12	38	Qualification for Relegation playoff
18	Vigevano (R)	38	6	11	21	40	76	−36	29	Relegation to Eccellenza
19	Borgorosso Arenzano (R)	38	6	7	25	25	64	−39	25 (Note: Borgorosso Arenzano will be docked 2 points in the next season.)	Relegation to Eccellenza
20	Settimo (R)	38	4	5	29	24	69	−45	17	Relegation to Eccellenza

Updated to match(es) played on 8 May 2011. Source: Rai Sport
Rules for classification: 1) points; 2) goal difference; 3) number of goals scored.
(C) Champions; (D) Disqualified; (P) Promoted; (R) Relegated

=== Girone B ===
==== Teams ====
Teams from Lombardy, Veneto & Trentino-Alto Adige/Südtirol

Club	City	Stadium	Capacity	2009–10 season
F.C. AlzanoCene 1909	Alzano Lombardo, Cene	Stadio Carillo Pesenti Pigna	1,900	2nd in Serie D Girone B
A.C. Cantù G.S. San Paolo	Cantù	Stadio Comunale (Cantù)	1,000	9th in Serie D Girone B
U.S. Caratese	Carate Brianza	Stadio XXV Aprile	3,000	15th in Serie D Girone B
A.C. Castellana	Castel Goffredo	Stadio Comunale (Castel Goffredo)	1,500	13th in Serie D Girone B
G.C. CastelnuovoSandrà	Castelnuovo del Garda	Stadio Montindon (Sant'Ambrogio di Valpolicella)	1,020	2nd in Eccellenza Veneto Girone B
U.S.C. Colognese	Cologno al Serio	Stadio Antonio Locatelli	1,000	6th in Serie D Girone B
U.S. Darfo Boario S.S.D.	Darfo Boario Terme	Stadio Comunale (Darfo Boario Terme)	1,200	4th in Serie D Girone B
S.C. Insubria Caronnese	Caronno Pertusella	Stadio Comunale (Caronno Pertusella)	1,000	7th in Serie D Girone B
A.C. Legnago Salus	Legnago	Stadio Mario Sandrini	2,152	1st in Eccellenza Veneto Girone A
Mantova F.C.	Mantova	Stadio Danilo Martelli	14,884	20th in Serie B
U.S. Olginatese	Olginate	Stadio Comunale (Olginate)	1,000	7th in Serie D Girone B
A.C. Ponte San Pietro Isola S.S.D.	Ponte San Pietro, Terno d'Isola	Stadio Matteo Legler	2,000	3rd in Serie D Girone B
Solbiatese Arno Calcio	Solbiate Arno	Stadio Felice Chinetti	4,500	12th in Serie D Girone B
A.C. Sterilgarda Castiglione	Castiglione delle Stiviere	Stadio Ugo Lusetti	2,500	4th in Eccellenza Lombardy C (as Castiglione Savoia)
Trento Calcio 1921	Trento	Stadio Briamasco	5,000	1st in Eccellenza Trentino-Alto Adige
A.S.D. Villafranca	Villafranca di Verona	Stadio Comunale (Villafranca di Verona)	1,000	10th in Serie D Girone C
U.S.D. Virtusvecomp Verona	Verona	Stadio Gavagnin	1,000	6th in Serie D Girone C
A.C. Voghera	Voghera	Stadio Giovanni Parisi	4,000	8th in Serie D Girone B

==== League table ====
Pos	Team	Pld	W	D	L	GF	GA	GD	Pts	Promotion or relegation
1	Mantova (P)	34	17	16	1	53	27	+26	67	Promotion to Seconda Divisione
2	Voghera	34	16	10	8	57	47	+10	58	Qualification for wild card playoff
3	Pontisola	34	16	10	8	49	39	+10	58	Qualification for wild card playoff
4	Colognese	34	14	14	6	48	40	+8	56	Qualification for wild card playoff
5	Olginatese	34	16	6	12	53	36	+17	54 (Note: Olginatese is qualified for the promotion playoffs after have beaten 6–5 (pen.) Legnago in the tie-break.)	Qualification for wild card playoff
6	Legnago	34	15	9	10	61	39	+22	54	
7	Insubria	34	15	9	10	48	41	+7	54	
8	Darfo Boario	34	13	12	9	52	36	+16	51	
9	Sterilgarda Castiglione	34	12	13	9	50	34	+16	49	
10	Cantù San Paolo	34	12	11	11	40	37	+3	47	
11	Virtus Verona	34	11	11	12	35	34	+1	44	
12	AlzanoCene	34	10	12	12	47	53	−6	42	
13	Castellana	34	9	11	14	33	43	−10	38	Qualification for Relegation playoff
14	Villafranca (Note: Villafranca remains in the league for repechage) (T)	34	9	8	17	39	59	−20	35	Qualification for Relegation playoff
15	Caratese	34	9	5	20	44	61	−17	32	Qualification for Relegation playoff
16	Trento (R)	34	8	8	18	35	58	−23	32	Qualification for Relegation playoff
17	CastelnuovoSandrà (R)	34	7	9	18	40	66	−26	30	Relegation to Eccellenza
18	Solbiatese (R)	34	6	8	20	26	60	−34	26	Relegation to Eccellenza

Updated to match(es) played on 8 May 2011. Source: Rai Sport
Rules for classification: 1) points; 2) goal difference; 3) number of goals scored.
(P) Promoted; (R) Relegated; (T) Qualified, but not yet for the particular phase indicated

=== Girone C ===
==== Teams ====
Teams from Veneto & Friuli-Venezia Giulia

Club	City	Stadium	Capacity	2009–10 season
A.C. Belluno 1905	Belluno	Stadio Polisportivo	2,585	13th in Serie D Girone C
A.C. Chioggia Sottomarina	Chioggia	Stadio Aldo e Dino Ballarin	3,622	4th in Serie D Girone D
A.C.D. Città di Concordia	Concordia Sagittaria	Stadio Comunale (Concordia Sagittaria)	2,500	16th in Serie D Girone C
A.C. Este	Este	Nuovo Stadio Comunale (Este)	1,200	2nd in Serie D Girone C
N.K. Kras A.S.D.	Monrupino	Stadio Repen	250	2nd in Eccellenza Friuli-Venezia Giulia
Calcio Montebelluna	Montebelluna	Stadio San Vigilio	2,000	14th in Serie D Girone C
U.C. Montecchio Maggiore	Montecchio Maggiore	Stadio Gino Corsaro	1,000	20th in Serie D Girone C
U.S. Opitergina	Oderzo	Stadio Opitergium	5,000	1st in Eccellenza Veneto Girone B
Pordenone Calcio S.S.D.	Pordenone	Stadio Ottavio Bottecchia	3,000	7th in Serie D Girone C
Rovigo Calcio	Rovigo	Stadio Francesco Gabrielli	3,200	9th in Serie D Girone C
SandonàJesoloCalcio	San Donà di Piave	Stadio Verino Zanutto	4,000	4th in Serie D Girone C (as U.S. Città di Jesolo)
Calcio San Paolo Padova	Padua	Stadio Plebiscito	9,600	12th in Serie D Girone C (as Albignasego Calcio)
A.S.D. Sanvitese	San Vito al Tagliamento	Stadio Comunale (San Vito al Tagliamento)	2,500	11th in Serie D Girone C
S.P. Tamai	Brugnera	Stadio Comunale (Brugnera)	1,000	8th in Serie D Girone C
A.S.D. Torviscosa	Torviscosa	Stadio Beppino Tonello	1,500	1st in Eccellenza Friuli-Venezia Giulia
A.S.D. Treviso 2009	Treviso	Stadio Omobono Tenni	10,000	7th in Eccellenza Veneto Girone B
A.S. Union Quinto	Quinto di Treviso	Stadio Omobono Tenni (Quinto di Treviso)	1,000	5th in Serie D Girone C
F.B.C. Unione Venezia	Venice	Stadio Pierluigi Penzo	7,450	3rd in Serie D Girone C

==== League table ====
Pos	Team	Pld	W	D	L	GF	GA	GD	Pts	Promotion or relegation
1	Treviso (P)	34	21	10	3	59	26	+33	73	Promotion to Seconda Divisione
2	Venezia	34	21	6	7	69	42	+27	69	Qualification for wild card playoff
3	Tamai	34	14	14	6	61	43	+18	56	Qualification for wild card playoff
4	SandonàJesolo	34	15	10	9	56	44	+12	55	Qualification for wild card playoff
5	San Paolo Padova	34	15	10	9	49	44	+5	54 (Note: Sanvitese and San Paolo Padova were docked 1 point.)	Qualification for wild card playoff
6	Union Quinto	34	13	10	11	50	42	+8	49	
7	Rovigo (E)	34	13	10	11	48	43	+5	47 (Note: Rovigo was docked 2 points.)	Folded (Note: Chioggia Sottomarina did not join 2011–12 championship and were excluded from football.)
8	Este	34	12	10	12	57	49	+8	46 (Note: Montecchio Maggiore readmitted in Serie D to the judgment of the High Court of Justice, that has transformed the score of Montebelluna-Este from 2–1 to 0–3, for infringement of the rule on under.)	
9	Sanvitese	34	11	12	11	50	54	−4	44	
10	Pordenone	34	11	9	14	52	53	−1	42	
11	Chioggia Sottomarina (E)	34	10	12	12	34	39	−5	42	Folded
12	Montebelluna	34	11	8	15	33	45	−12	41	
13	Montecchio Maggiore (T)	34	10	10	14	43	48	−5	40	Qualification for Relegation playoff
14	Belluno	34	11	6	17	38	48	−10	39	Qualification for Relegation playoff
15	Opitergina (R)	34	8	12	14	50	63	−13	36	Qualification for Relegation playoff
16	Concordia	34	9	9	16	49	68	−19	36	Qualification for Relegation playoff
17	Kras (R)	34	7	11	16	39	62	−23	32	Relegation to Eccellenza
18	Torviscosa (R)	34	4	11	19	41	66	−25	23	Relegation to Eccellenza

Updated to match(es) played on 8 May 2011. Source: Rai Sport
Rules for classification: 1) points; 2) goal difference; 3) number of goals scored.
(E) Eliminated; (P) Promoted; (R) Relegated; (T) Qualified, but not yet for the particular phase indicated

=== Girone D ===
==== Teams ====
Teams from Lombardy, Emilia-Romagna & Tuscany

Club	City	Stadium	Capacity	2009–10 season
G.S. Bagnolese	Bagnolo in Piano	Stadio Fratelli Campari	1,000	1st in Eccellenza Emilia-Romagna Girone A
U.S.D. Borgo a Buggiano 1920	Buggiano	Stadio Alberto Benedetti	1,000	10th in Serie D Girone D
Camaiore Calcio	Camaiore	Stadio Comunale (Camaiore)	3,000	5th in Eccellenza Tuscany Girone A
A.C. Carpenedolo	Carpenedolo	Stadio Mundial '82	3,000	16th in Lega Pro Seconda Divisione Girone A
Castel San Pietro Terme Calcio	Castel San Pietro Terme	Stadio Comunale (Castel San Pietro Terme)	2,800	17th in Serie D Girone D
U.S. Fiorenzuola 1922	Fiorenzuola d'Arda	Stadio Comunale (Fiorenzuola d'Arda)	4,000	14th in Serie D Girone B
U.S. Forcoli Calcio 1921	Palaia	Stadio Guido Brunner	3,000	9th in Serie D Girone E
A.S.D. Mezzolara	Budrio	Stadio Pietro Zucchini	1,300	11th in Serie D Girone D
A.S.D. Mobilieri Ponsacco Calcio	Ponsacco	Stadio Comunale (Ponsacco)	3,220	14th in Serie D Girone D
Nuova Verolese Calcio	Verolanuova	Stadio Enrico Bragadina	1,100	14th in Serie D Girone C
A.S. Pizzighettone	Pizzighettone	Stadio Comunale (Pizzighettone)	2,500	10th in Serie D Girone B
U.S. Pontedera 1912	Pontedera	Stadio Ettore Mannucci	5,000	12th in Serie D Girone D
G.S.D. Rosignano Sei Rose	Rosignano Marittimo	Stadio Ernesto Solvay	1,400	6th in Serie D Girone D
U.S.D. Calcio Rudianese	Rudiano	Stadio Comunale (Rudiano)	1,000	5th in Eccellenza Lombardy Girone C
U.S. Russi	Russi	Stadio Bruno Bucci	1,500	7th in Serie D Girone D
A.S.D. San Miniato Tuttocuoio	San Miniato	Stadio Leporaia	600	1st in Eccellenza Tuscany Girone A
Pol. Virtus Castelfranco Calcio	Castelfranco Emilia	Stadio Fausto Ferrarini	1,280	8th in Serie D Girone D
A.S.D. Virtus Pavullese	Pavullo nel Frignano	Stadio Giuseppe Minelli	2,500	2nd in Eccellenza Emilia-Romagna Girone A

==== League table ====
Pos	Team	Pld	W	D	L	GF	GA	GD	Pts	Promotion or relegation
1	Borgo a Buggiano (P)	34	19	12	3	53	23	+30	69	Lega Pro Seconda Divisione
2	Pontedera	34	18	9	7	47	28	+19	63	Qualification for wild card playoff
3	Bagnolese	34	15	11	8	55	38	+17	56	Qualification for wild card playoff
4	Virtus Castelfranco	34	13	15	6	43	28	+15	54	Qualification for wild card playoff
5	Mezzolara	34	16	5	13	51	48	+3	53	Qualification for wild card playoff
6	Camaiore	34	13	13	8	44	39	+5	52	
7	Forcoli	34	13	11	10	41	39	+2	50	
8	Pizzighettone	34	12	11	11	46	39	+7	47	
9	Rosignano	34	11	14	9	39	32	+7	47	
10	Rudianese	34	12	11	11	41	37	+4	47	
11	Fiorenzuola	34	12	10	12	38	40	−2	46	
12	San Miniato Tuttocuoio	34	11	13	10	38	35	+3	46	
13	Virtus Pavullese	34	11	11	12	37	40	−3	44 (Note: Virtus Pavullese is safe for the benefit of direct matches with Mobilieri Ponsacco.)	
14	Mobilieri Ponsacco	34	9	17	8	28	23	+5	44	Transferred sports title (Note: Mobilieri Ponsacco gave their sports title to Pelli Santacroce and they dissolved sometime around summer 2011.)
15	Carpenedolo (T)	34	9	11	14	44	47	−3	38	Qualification for Relegation playoff (Note: Carpenedolo remains in the league to fill the vacancies created.)
16	Castel San Pietro (R)	34	7	10	17	33	50	−17	31	Relegation to Eccellenza
17	Russi (R)	34	8	5	21	31	52	−21	29	Relegation to Eccellenza
18	Nuova Verolese (R)	34	1	3	30	14	87	−73	6	Relegation to Eccellenza

Updated to match(es) played on 8 May 2011. Source: Rai Sport
Rules for classification: 1) points; 2) goal difference; 3) number of goals scored.
(P) Promoted; (R) Relegated; (T) Qualified, but not yet for the particular phase indicated

=== Girone E ===
==== Teams ====
Teams from Tuscany, Umbria & Lazio

Club	City	Stadium	Capacity	2009–10 season
A.S.D. Atletico Arezzo	Arezzo	Stadio Città di Arezzo	15,128	4th in Lega Pro Prima Divisione Girone A
A.S. Castel Rigone	Passignano sul Trasimeno	Stadio San Bartolomeo	1,200	3rd in Serie D Girone E
A.S. Deruta	Deruta	Stadio Comunale (Deruta)	600	6th in Serie D Girone E
A.S.D. Flaminia Civita Castellana	Civita Castellana	Stadio Turrido Madani	1,300	6th in Serie D Girone G
A.S.D. Fortis Juventus 1909	Borgo San Lorenzo	Stadio Giacomo Romanelli	2,500	12th in Serie D Girone E
S.S.D. Group Città di Castello	Città di Castello	Stadio Corrado Bernicchi	1,000	4th in Serie D Girone E
A.C. Monteriggioni A.S.D.	Monteriggioni	Stadio Mauro Nannotti	1,000	15th in Serie D Girone E
Montevarchi Calcio Aquila 1902	Montevarchi	Stadio Gastone Brilli Peri	7,200	11th in Serie D Girone E
Orvietana Calcio	Orvieto	Stadio Luigi Muzi	2,500	13th in Serie D Girone E
Perugia Calcio	Perugia	Stadio Renato Curi	28,000	11th in Lega Pro Prima Divisione Girone A
U.S. Pianese	Piancastagnaio	Stadio Comunale (Piancastagnaio)	1,000	1st in Eccellenza Tuscany Girone B
A.S.D. Pontevecchio	Ponte San Giovanni	Stadio degli Ornari	1,000	14th in Serie D Girone E
A.S.D. Sansepolcro Calcio	Sansepolcro	Stadio Giovanni Buitoni	2,000	7th in Serie D Girone E
A.C.V. Scandicci A.S.D.	Scandicci	Stadio Turri	1,800	10th in Serie D Girone E
A.S. Sestese Calcio	Sesto Fiorentino	Stadio Piero Torrini	5,000	8th in Serie D Girone E
A.S.D. Sporting Terni	Terni	Stadio Mirko Fabrizi	1,070	16th in Serie D Girone E
A.S.D. Todi Calcio	Todi	Stadio Franco Martelli	1,200	1st in Eccellenza Umbria
Voluntas Calcio Spoleto	Spoleto	Stadio Comunale (Spoleto)	1,800	3rd in Eccellenza Umbria

==== League table ====
Pos	Team	Pld	W	D	L	GF	GA	GD	Pts	Promotion or relegation
1	Perugia (C, P)	34	22	8	4	51	24	+27	74	Promotion to Lega Pro Seconda Divisione (Note: Perugia won Coppa Italia Serie D 2010–11.)
2	Castel Rigone	34	19	5	10	64	44	+20	62	Qualification for wild card playoff
3	Sansepolcro	34	17	9	8	44	28	+16	60	Qualification for wild card playoff
4	Todi	34	17	7	10	49	33	+16	58	Qualification for wild card playoff
5	Pianese	34	15	10	9	52	46	+6	55	Qualification for wild card playoff
6	Group Castello	34	13	12	9	44	38	+6	51	
7	Flaminia Civita Castellana	34	12	12	10	44	33	+11	48	
8	Scandicci	34	12	10	12	43	44	−1	46	
9	Arezzo	34	11	12	11	42	41	+1	45	
10	Sporting Terni	34	10	14	10	43	43	0	44	
11	Pontevecchio	34	11	10	13	44	46	−2	43	
12	Voluntas Spoleto	34	11	9	14	41	37	+4	42	
13	Sestese	34	10	8	16	43	51	−8	38	Qualification for Relegation playoff (Note: Sestese remains in the league to fill the vacancies created.)
14	Orvietana	34	10	7	17	39	50	−11	37	Qualification for Relegation playoff
15	Montevarchi (R)	34	9	8	17	39	61	−22	35	Qualification for Relegation playoff
16	Deruta	34	8	10	16	32	54	−22	34	Qualification for Relegation playoff
17	Fortis Juventus (R)	34	8	9	17	37	56	−19	33	Relegation to Eccellenza
18	Monteriggioni (R)	34	7	8	19	33	53	−20	29	Excluded from football after transfer of sports title (Note: Monteriggioni gave their sports title to Olimpia Colligiana and were dissolved on summer 2011.)

Updated to match(es) played on 8 May 2011. Source: Rai Sport
Rules for classification: 1) points; 2) goal difference; 3) number of goals scored.
(C) Champions; (P) Promoted; (R) Relegated

=== Girone F ===
==== Teams ====
Teams from Emilia-Romagna, Marche, Abruzzo & Molise

Club	City	Stadium	Capacity	2009–10 season
S.S.D. Atessa Val di Sangro	Atessa	Stadio Monte Marcone	2,000	3rd in Serie D Girone F
A.S. Atletico Trivento	Trivento	Stadio Comunale (Trivento)	1,000	6th in Serie D Girone F
A.S.D. Bojano	Bojano	Stadio Adriano Colalillo	3,368	12th in Serie D Girone F
A.S. Real Cesenatico	Cesenatico	Stadio Alfiero Moretti	9,000	2nd in Eccellenza Emilia-Romagna Girone B
Civitanovese Calcio	Civitanova Marche	Stadio Comunale (Civitanova Marche)	4,000	5th in Serie D Girone F
F.C. Forlì	Forlì	Stadio Tullo Morgagni	3,600	1st in Eccellenza Emilia-Romagna Girone B
F.C. Fossombrone	Fossombrone	Stadio Comunale (Fossombrone)	1,000	3rd in Serie D Girone D
Jesina Calcio	Jesi	Stadio Pacifico Carotti	5,000	4th in Eccellenza Marche
A.S.D. Luco Canistro	Canistro	Stadio Comunale (Canistro)	600	14th in Serie D Girone F
A.S.D. Miglianico Calcio	Miglianico	Stadio Fratelli Ciavatta	600	11th in Serie D Girone F
Pol. Olympia Agnonese	Agnone	Stadio Civitelle	4,000	8th in Serie D Girone F
Real Rimini F.C.	Rimini	Stadio Romeo Neri	9,768	16th in Serie D Girone D (as Valleverde Riccione)
U.S.D. Recanatese	Recanati	Stadio Nicola Tubaldi	2,000	7th in Serie D Girone F
Renato Curi Angolana	Città Sant'Angelo	Stadio Comunale (Città Sant'Angelo)	4,120	13th in Serie D Girone F
A.C. Rimini 1912	Rimini	Stadio Romeo Neri	9,768	4th in Lega Pro Prima Divisione Girone B
U.S. Sambenedettese	San Benedetto del Tronto	Stadio Riviera delle Palme	7,494	1st in Eccellenza Marche
A.S.D. Santarcangelo Calcio	Santarcangelo di Romagna	Stadio Valentino Mazzola	2,000	5th in Serie D Girone F
Santegidiese Calcio 1948 S.S.D.	Sant'Egidio alla Vibrata	Stadio Comunale (Sant'Egidio alla Vibrata)	2,000	2nd in Serie D Girone F
Teramo Calcio	Teramo	Stadio Comunale (Teramo)	7,498	1st in Eccellenza Abruzzo
U.S. Venafro	Venafro	Stadio Marchese Alessandro del Prete	1,500	1st in Eccellenza Molise

==== League table ====
Pos	Team	Pld	W	D	L	GF	GA	GD	Pts	Promotion or relegation
1	Santarcangelo (C, P)	38	22	11	5	63	20	+43	77	Promotion to Lega Pro Seconda Divisione
2	Teramo	38	21	10	7	63	38	+25	73	Qualification for wild card playoff
3	Rimini (O, P)	38	20	11	7	66	39	+27	71 (Note: Rimini won the Promotion Playoffs and was promoted to Lega Pro Seconda Divisione.)	Qualification for wild card playoff
4	Forlì	38	18	12	8	50	43	+7	66	Qualification for wild card playoff
5	Jesina	38	17	9	12	43	34	+9	60	Qualification for wild card playoff
6	R.C. Angolana	38	17	7	14	59	44	+15	58	
7	Santegidiese	38	16	11	11	62	51	+11	58 (Note: Santegidiese was docked 1 point.)	
8	Recanatese	38	15	11	12	31	34	−3	56	
9	Real Rimini	38	16	8	14	51	44	+7	56	
10	Civitanovese	38	12	16	10	37	35	+2	52	
11	Atletico Trivento	38	11	18	9	56	43	+13	51	
12	Sambenedettese	38	12	15	11	51	46	+5	51	
13	Luco Canistro	38	14	9	15	50	55	−5	51	
14	Olympia Agnonese	38	13	12	13	42	51	−9	51	
15	Venafro (R)	38	13	10	15	52	64	−12	49	Relegation to Eccellenza (Note: Venafro does not join 2011–12 championship and relegated to Eccellenza.)
16	Atessa V.d.S.	38	10	17	11	35	43	−8	47	
17	Cesenatico (R)	38	9	8	21	39	61	−22	35	Relegation to Eccellenza
18	Miglianico	38	7	11	20	40	57	−17	32	Relegation to Eccellenza (Note: Miglianico remains in the league to fill the vacancies created.)
19	Fossombrone (R)	37	2	13	22	24	56	−32	19	Relegation to Eccellenza
20	Bojano (R)	38	0	10	28	21	75	−54	10	Relegation to Eccellenza

Updated to match(es) played on 8 May 2011. Source: Rai Sport
Rules for classification: 1) points; 2) goal difference; 3) number of goals scored.
(C) Champions; (O) Play-off winners; (P) Promoted; (R) Relegated

=== Girone G ===
==== Teams ====
Teams from Campania, Lazio & Sardinia

Club	City	Stadium	Capacity	2009–10 season
A.S.D. Anziolavinio	Anzio	Stadio Massimo Bruschini	3,000	2nd in Eccellenza Lazio Girone A
F.C. Aprilia	Aprilia	Stadio Quinto Ricci	2,000	7th in Serie D Girone G (as Rondinelle Latina)
Pol. Arzachena	Arzachena	Stadio Biagio Pirina	2,400	16th in Serie D Girone G
A.S.D. Astrea	Rome	Stadio Casal del Marmo	2,500	14th in Serie D Girone G
A.S.D. Bacoli Sibilla Flegrea	Bacoli	Stadio Tony Chiovato	1,720	14th in Serie D Girone H
Budoni Calcio	Budoni	Stadio Comunale (Budoni)	1,500	10th in Serie D Girone G
Socio Culturale Castiadas	Castiadas	Stadio Comunale (Castiadas)	1,000	4th in Eccellenza Sardinia
A.S.D. Cynthia 1920	Genzano di Roma	Stadio Comunale (Genzano di Roma)	6,000	13th in Serie D Girone G
G.S. Fidene Calcio	Rome	Stadio Walter Cervini	2,000	1st in Eccellenza Lazio Girone A
A.C.D. Guidonia Montecelio	Guidonia Montecelio	Stadio Proprio delle Case	2,900	2nd in Serie D Girone G
Pol. Monterotondo Calcio	Monterotondo	Stadio Fausto Cecconi	1,000	5th in Serie D Girone G
A.C. Porto Torres	Porto Torres	Stadio Comunale (Porto Torres)	5,000	1st in Eccellenza Sardinia
A.S.D. Sanluri Calcio	Sanluri	Stadio Campu Nou	1,000	4th in Serie D Girone G
A.S.D. Selargius Calcio	Selargius	Stadio Generale Porcu	2,000	5th in Serie D Girone G
S.S. Tavolara Calcio	Olbia	Stadio Bruno Nespoli	8,000	11th in Serie D Girone G
Pol. Viribus Unitis	Somma Vesuviana	Stadio Felice Nappi	2,500	15th in Serie D Girone I
A.S. Viterbese Calcio	Viterbo	Stadio Enrico Rocchi	6,000	8th in Serie D Girone G
U.S.D. Zagarolo	Zagarolo	Stadio Elio Mastrangeli	2,000	1st in Eccellenza Lazio Girone B

==== League table ====
Pos	Team	Pld	W	D	L	GF	GA	GD	Pts	Promotion or relegation
1	Aprilia (C, P)	34	20	7	7	67	29	+38	67	Lega Pro Seconda Divisione
2	Bacoli Sibilla	34	18	10	6	62	37	+25	64	Qualification for wild card playoff
3	Monterotondo	34	16	9	9	53	46	+7	57	Qualification for wild card playoff
4	Fidene	34	16	7	11	49	39	+10	55	Qualification for wild card playoff
5	Viribus Unitis	34	15	8	11	38	40	−2	53	Qualification for wild card playoff
6	Viterbese	34	12	14	8	49	46	+3	50	
7	Zagarolo	34	13	10	11	51	41	+10	49	
8	Budoni	34	12	11	11	33	30	+3	47	
9	Porto Torres	34	10	16	8	43	34	+9	46	
10	Anziolavinio	34	10	15	9	42	41	+1	45	
11	Arzachena	34	11	12	11	51	54	−3	45	
12	Selargius	34	11	11	12	40	40	0	44	
13	Cynthia	34	9	12	13	31	42	−11	39	Qualification for Relegation playoff
14	Astrea	34	9	11	14	42	57	−15	38	Qualification for Relegation playoff
15	Guidonia (R)	34	9	9	16	29	42	−13	36	Qualification for Relegation playoff
16	Sanluri (R)	34	8	7	19	39	56	−17	31 (Note: Sanluri is qualified for the relegation playout after have beaten 2–1 (aet) Tavolara in the tie-break.)	Qualification for Relegation playoff
17	Tavolara (R)	34	6	13	15	39	55	−16	31	Relegation to Eccellenza
18	Castiadas (R)	34	8	4	22	32	61	−29	28	Relegation to Eccellenza

Updated to match(es) played on 8 May 2011. Source: Rai Sport
Rules for classification: 1) points; 2) goal difference; 3) number of goals scored.
(C) Champions; (P) Promoted; (R) Relegated

=== Girone H ===
==== Teams ====
Teams from Campania, Apulia, Lazio & Basilicata

Club	City	Stadium	Capacity	2010–11 season
U.S. Angri Calcio 1927 A.S.D.	Angri	Stadio Pasquale Novi	3,000	8th in Serie D Girone H
U.S. Arzanese	Arzano	Stadio Sabatino De Rosa	4,000	3rd in Eccellenza Campania Girone A
A.S.D. Battipagliese	Battipaglia	Stadio Luigi Pastena	13,000	1st in Eccellenza Campania Girone B
A.S.D. Boville Ernica Calcio	Boville Ernica	Stadio Montorli	1,500	13th in Serie D Girone G
G.S. Capriatese	Capriati a Volturno	Stadio Comunale (Capriati a Volturno)	1,000	3rd in Eccellenza Molise
Fortis Murgia Calcio	Irsina	Stadio Antonio D'Angelo(Altamura)	4,000	1st in Eccellenza Basilicata
A.S. Fortis Trani	Trani	Stadio Comunale (Trani)	10,700	2nd in Eccellenza Apulia
A.S.D. Francavilla Calcio	Francavilla Fontana	Stadio Giovanni Paolo II	2,000	18th in Serie D Girone H
F.C. Francavilla	Francavilla in Sinni	Stadio Nunzio Fittipaldi	1,200	7th in Serie D Girone H
Pol. Gaeta	Gaeta	Stadio Antonio Riciniello	2,000	2nd in Serie D Girone G
A.D.C. Ars et Labor Grottaglie	Grottaglie	Stadio D'Amuri	2,500	10th in Serie D Girone H
A.S.D. Ischia Isolaverde	Ischia	Stadio Vincenzo Mazzella	5,000	16th in Serie D Girone H
Nuova Nardò Calcio	Nardò	Stadio Comunale Giovanni Paolo II	5,000	1st in Eccellenza Apulia
Ostuni Sport	Ostuni	Stadio Comunale (Ostuni)	2,200	12th in Serie D Girone H
Pol. C.S. Pisticci	Pisticci	Stadio Gaetano Michetti	1,200	17th in Serie D Girone H
A.S.D.C. Pomigliano	Pomigliano d'Arco	Stadio Ugo Gobbato	2,500	8th in Serie D Girone H
F.C. Sant'Antonio Abate	Sant'Antonio Abate	Stadio Comunale (Sant'Antonio Abate)	1,900	5th in Serie D Girone H
A.S.D. Virtus Casarano	Casarano	Stadio Giuseppe Capozza	6,200	3rd in Serie D Girone H

==== League table ====
Pos	Team	Pld	W	D	L	GF	GA	GD	Pts	Promotion or relegation
1	Arzanese (C, P)	34	20	11	3	60	28	+32	71	Promotion to Lega Pro Seconda Divisione
2	Pomigliano	34	20	9	5	47	24	+23	69	Qualification for wild card playoff
3	Gaeta	34	19	10	5	50	18	+32	67	Qualification for wild card playoff
4	Nardò	34	17	11	6	48	28	+20	62	Qualification for wild card playoff
5	Virtus Casarano	34	16	8	10	46	30	+16	56	Qualification for wild card playoff
6	Francavilla	34	12	11	11	43	38	+5	47	
7	Ischia	34	11	11	12	37	35	+2	44	
8	Capriatese (R)	34	11	11	12	33	35	−2	44	Excluded from football club after transferring sports title (Note: Capriatese gave their sports title to Nuvla San Felice and were dissolved on summer 2011.)
9	Fortis Murgia	34	12	8	14	33	38	−5	44	
10	Boville Ernica	34	12	8	14	31	36	−5	44	
11	Fortis Trani	34	12	8	14	34	42	−8	44	
12	Grottaglie	34	12	6	16	26	41	−15	42 (Note: Grottaglie is safe after have beaten 2–0 Sant'Antonio Abate in the tie-break.)	
13	Sant'Antonio Abate	34	10	12	12	37	43	−6	42	Qualification for Relegation playoff (Note: Sant'Antonio Abate remains in the league to fill the vacancies created.)
14	Battipagliese	34	10	9	15	36	36	0	39	Qualification for Relegation playoff
15	Pisticci (R)	34	8	14	12	41	37	+4	38	Qualification for Relegation playoff
16	Angri (R)	34	9	9	16	42	59	−17	36	Excluded from football after not joining 2011–12 championship (Note: Angri does not join 2011–12 championship and excluded from football.)
17	ASD Francavilla (R)	34	7	7	20	27	58	−31	28	Relegation to Eccellenza
18	Ostuni (R)	34	3	7	24	19	64	−45	16	Relegation to Eccellenza

Updated to match(es) played on 8 May 2011. Source: Rai Sport
Rules for classification: 1) points; 2) goal difference; 3) number of goals scored.
(C) Champions; (P) Promoted; (R) Relegated

=== Girone I ===
==== Teams ====
Teams from Campania, Calabria, & Sicily

Club	City	Stadium	Capacity	2010–11 season
S.S.D. Acireale Calcio 1946	Acireale	Stadio Tupparello	8,000	1st in Eccellenza Sicily Girone B
A.S.D. Atletico Nola 1925	Nola	Stadio Sporting Club	1,000	1st in Eccellenza Campania Girone A
U.S. Casertana 1908	Caserta	Stadio Alberto Pinto	12,000	6th in Serie D Girone H
Cittanova Interpiana Calcio	Cittanova	Stadio Fortunato Redi (Melicucco)	2,500	3rd in Serie D Girone I (as Rosarno)
A.S.C. Ebolitana 1925	Eboli	Stadio José Guimarães Dirceu	10,000	2nd in Eccellenza Campania Girone B
A.S.D. Forza e Coraggio	Benevento	Stadio Pasquale Meomartini	2,000	4th in Serie D Girone H
A.S.D. HinterReggio	Reggio Calabria	Stadio Ravagnese	1,200	11th in Serie D Girone I
S.C. Marsala 1912	Marsala	Stadio Antonino Lombardo Angotta	13,500	1st in Eccellenza Sicily Girone A
Mazara Calcio A.S.D.	Mazara del Vallo	Stadio Nino Vaccara	3,266	12th in Serie D Girone I
A.C.R. Messina	Messina	Stadio San Filippo	40,200	13th in Serie D Girone I
A.S.D. Modica Calcio	Modica	Stadio Caitina	2,500	9th in Serie D Girone I
Nissa F.C. A.S.D.	Caltanissetta	Stadio Marco Tomaselli	9,000	8th in Serie D Girone I
U.S.D. Noto Calcio	Noto	Stadio Polisportivo Palatucci	5,000	2nd in Eccellenza Sicily Girone B
A.S.D. Real Nocera Superiore	Nocera Superiore	Stadio Alfaterno	1,200	3rd in Eccellenza Campania Girone B
Rossanese A.S.D.	Rossano	Stadio Stefano Rizzo	6,000	6th in Serie D Girone I
A.S.D. Sambiase 1962	Lamezia Terme	Stadio Guido D'Ippolito	2,000	10th in Serie D Girone I
S.S.D. Sapri Calcio	Sapri	Stadio Italia (Sapri)	1,014	7th in Serie D Girone I
F.C. Turris 1944 A.S.D.	Torre del Greco	Stadio Amerigo Liguori	4,000	11th in Serie D Girone H
A.S. Valle Grecanica	Bagaladi	Stadio Saverio Spinella (Melito di Porto Salvo)	1,100	1st in Eccellenza Calabria (as Omega Bagaladi)

==== League table ====
Pos	Team	Pld	W	D	L	GF	GA	GD	Pts	Promotion or relegation
1	Ebolitana (C, P)	36	28	5	3	69	21	+48	89	Promotion to Lega Pro Seconda Divisione
2	Forza e Coraggio (R)	36	26	5	5	66	28	+38	83	Relegation to Seconda Categoria (Note: Forza e Coraggio does not join 2011–12 championship and relegated to Seconda Categoria.)
3	Casertana	36	19	11	6	62	31	+31	68	Qualification for wild card playoff
4	Sambiase	36	19	5	12	48	36	+12	62	Qualification for wild card playoff
5	Turris	36	15	13	8	69	46	+23	58	Qualification for wild card playoff (Note: Turris qualified for the Semifinals of the Promotion playoff as finalist of Coppa Italia Serie D 2010–11, because the winner Perugia is already promoted in Lega Pro Seconda Divisione. It lost the final Promotion Playoffs with Rimini.)
6	Nissa	36	15	12	9	43	29	+14	57	Qualification for wild card playoff
7	Valle Grecanica	36	14	7	15	55	48	+7	49	
8	HinterReggio	36	12	13	11	40	38	+2	49	
9	Messina	36	15	8	13	43	48	−5	49 (Note: Messina was docked 4 points.)	
10	Sapri (R)	36	13	8	15	56	53	+3	47	Excluded from football after they did not appeal against the exclusion of internet data (Note: Sapri did not appeal against the exclusion of Covisod and were excluded from football.)
11	Real Nocera	36	13	7	16	43	46	−3	46	
12	Cittanova Interpiana	36	11	11	14	33	38	−5	44	
13	Acireale	36	12	7	17	39	42	−3	43	
14	Noto	36	13	8	15	44	46	−2	42 (Note: Noto was docked 5 points.)	Qualification for Relegation playoff
15	Marsala	36	10	8	18	33	49	−16	38	Qualification for Relegation playoff
16	Modica (R)	36	10	8	18	30	50	−20	38	Qualification for Relegation playoff
17	Rossanese (R)	36	8	11	17	28	51	−23	35	Qualification for Relegation playoff
18	Mazara (R)	36	9	6	21	49	66	−17	33	Relegation to Eccellenza
19	Nola (R)	36	2	3	31	19	103	−84	9	Relegation to Eccellenza

Updated to match(es) played on 8 May 2011. Source: Rai Sport
Rules for classification: 1) points; 2) goal difference; 3) number of goals scored.
(C) Champions; (P) Promoted; (R) Relegated

== Division promotions ==
All teams promoted to Lega Pro Seconda Divisione 2011–12.

Division	Winners	Other promotions
A	Cuneo	
B	Mantova	
C	Treviso	
D	Borgo a Buggiano	
E	Perugia	
F	Santarcangelo	Rimini
G	Aprilia	
H	Arzanese	
I	Ebolitana	

== Scudetto Dilettanti ==
=== First round ===
- division winners placed into 3 groups of 3
- group winners and best second-placed team qualify for semi-finals

==== Group 1 ====
Pos	Team	Pld	W	D	L	GF	GA	GD	Pts
1	Cuneo (A)	2	1	1	0	5	2	+3	4
2	Treviso (C)	2	0	2	0	1	1	0	2
3	Mantova (B)	2	0	1	1	1	4	−3	1

Treviso (C)	1–1	(A) Cuneo	played on May 22, 2011
Mantova (B)	0–0	(C) Treviso	played on May 29, 2011
Cuneo (A)	4–1	(B) Mantova	played on June 4, 2011

==== Group 2 ====
Pos	Team	Pld	W	D	L	GF	GA	GD	Pts
1	Perugia (E)	2	1	1	0	2	1	+1	4
2	Santarcangelo (F)	2	0	2	0	1	1	0	2
3	Borgo a Buggiano (D)	2	0	1	1	2	3	−1	1

Santarcangelo (F)	0–0	(E) Perugia	played on May 22, 2011
Borgo a Buggiano (D)	1–1	(F) Santarcangelo	played on May 29, 2011
Perugia (E)	2–1	(D) Borgo a Buggiano	played on June 5, 2011

==== Group 3 ====
Pos	Team	Pld	W	D	L	GF	GA	GD	Pts
1	Arzanese (H)	2	1	1	0	5	3	+2	4
2	Ebolitana (I)	2	1	1	0	5	3	+2	4
3	Aprilia (G)	2	0	0	2	2	6	−4	0

Arzanese wins Group 3 for better position than Ebolitana in Coppa Disciplina

Arzanese (H)	3–1	(G) Aprilia	played on May 22, 2011
Aprilia (G)	1–3	(I) Ebolitana	played on May 29, 2011
Ebolitana (I)	2–2	(H) Arzanese	played on June 5, 2011

=== Semi-finals ===
One leg played June 9, 2011

- On neutral ground at Treviso, Stadio Omobono Tenni

Team 1	Score	Team 2
Cuneo (A)	1−1(pen 5−3)	(I) Ebolitana

- On neutral ground at Treviso, Stadio Omobono Tenni

Team 1	Score	Team 2
Arzanese (H)	1−1(pen 5−6)	(E) Perugia

=== Final ===
Played on June 11, 2011

- On neutral ground at Treviso, Stadio Omobono Tenni

Team 1	Score	Team 2
Cuneo (A)	1−0	(E) Perugia

Winner: Cuneo

== Tie-breakers ==
- Before the promotion playoffs and relegation playout could begin, three tie-breakers needed to be played.

Girone B − 5th−6th place − Played on May 15, 2011

Team 1	Score	Team 2
Legnago	2−2(pen. 5−6)	Olginatese

The winner Olginatese qualified for the promotion playoffs and the loser Legnago remained in Serie D.

Girone G − 16th−17th place − Played on May 15, 2011

Team 1	Score	Team 2
Sanluri	2−1 (aet)	Tavolara

The winner Sanluri qualified for the relegation playout and the loser Tavolara relegated to Eccellenza.

Girone H − 12th−13th place − Played on May 15, 2011

Team 1	Score	Team 2
Grottaglie	2−0	Sant'Antonio Abate

The winner Grottaglie remained in Serie D and the loser Sant'Antonio Abate forced to play in relegation playout.

== Promotion playoffs ==
Promotion playoffs involved a total of 37 teams; four from each of the nine Serie D divisions (teams placed from 2nd through to 5th) with the Coppa Italia Serie D winner that is directly admitted to the Semi-final round. In this season is qualified the finalist Turris, because the winner Perugia is already promoted in Lega Pro Seconda Divisione.

=== Rules ===
- The first two rounds were one-legged matches played in the home field of the best-placed team.
- The games ending in ties were extended to extra time. The higher classified team was declared the winner if the game was still tied after extra time. Penalty kicks were not taken.
- Round one matched 2nd & 5th-placed teams (2nd & 6th in Girone I), and 3rd & 4th-placed teams within each division.
- The two winners from each division played each other in the second round.
- The nine winners − one each from the nine Serie D divisions − were then split into three groups of three teams each. Every team played two matches, one against each of the other two opponents within the group. The three group winners qualified for the semifinal round, joining Turris.
- The semi-finals were two-legged matches, and the respective winners moved on to play in a one-legged final hosted in a neutral ground.
- The winner Rimini is promoted to Lega Pro Seconda Divisione.
- The tournament results provided a list, starting with the finalist Turris, by which vacancies could be filled in Lega Pro Seconda Divisione.

=== First round ===
- Played on May 15 (May 18 for Girone B), 2011
- Single-legged matches played at best placed club home field: 2nd-placed team plays home 5th-placed team (6th in Girone I), 3rd-placed team plays home 4th placed team
- Games ending in a tie are extended to extra time, if still tied, the higher-classified team wins

Team 1	Score	Team 2
V.d.A. Saint-Christophe (A2)	1−1(aet)	(A5) Seregno
Asti (A3)	1−2	(A4) Aquanera
Voghera (B2)	2−1	(B5) Olginatese
Pontisola (B3)	0−1	(B4) Colognese
Venezia (C2)	1−0	(C5) San Paolo Padova
Tamai (C3)	2−3	(C4) SandonàJesolo
Pontedera (D2)	2−0	(D5) Mezzolara
Bagnolese (D3)	3−4	(D4) Virtus Castelfranco
Castel Rigone (E2)	0−2	(E5) Pianese
Sansepolcro (E3)	1−0	(E4) Todi
Teramo (F2)	1−0	(F5) Jesina
Rimini (F3)	3−2(aet)	(F4) Forlì
Bacoli Sibilla (G2)	2−1	(G5) Viribus Unitis
Monterotondo (G3)	1−0	(G4) Fidene
Pomigliano (H2)	3−1	(H5) Virtus Casarano
Gaeta (H3)	3−2	(H4) Nardò
Forza e Coraggio (I2)	3−1	(I6) Nissa
Casertana (I3)	1−2	(I4) Sambiase

=== Second round ===
- Played on May 22, 2011
- Single-legged matches played at best placed club home field
- Games ending in a tie are extended to extra time, if still tied, the higher-classified team wins

Team 1	Score	Team 2
V.d.A. Saint-Christophe (A2)	1−1(aet)	(A4) Aquanera
Voghera (B2)	3−1	(B4) Colognese
Venezia (C2)	2−3	(C4) SandonàJesolo
Pontedera (D2)	2−0	(D4) Virtus Castelfranco
Sansepolcro (E3)	3−3(aet)	(E5) Pianese
Teramo (F2)	1−3(aet)	(F3) Rimini
Bacoli Sibilla (G2)	3−0	(G3) Monterotondo
Pomigliano (H2)	3−1	(H3) Gaeta
Forza e Coraggio (I2)	2−0	(I4) Sambiase

=== Third round ===
- group winners qualify for semi-finals

==== Triangular 1 ====
Pos	Team	Pld	W	D	L	GF	GA	GD	Pts
1	SandonàJesolo (C4)	2	1	1	0	5	3	+2	4
2	Bacoli Sibilla (G2)	2	1	1	0	5	3	+2	4
3	Pontedera (D2)	2	0	0	2	2	6	−4	0

SandonàJesolo wins Triangular 1 for better position than Bacoli Sibilla in Coppa Disciplina

SandonàJesolo (C4)	2–2	(G2) Bacoli Sibilla	May 29, 2011
Pontedera (D2)	1–3	(C4) SandonàJesolo	June 5, 2011
Bacoli Sibilla (G2)	3–1	(D2) Pontedera	June 8, 2011

==== Triangular 2 ====
Pos	Team	Pld	W	D	L	GF	GA	GD	Pts
1	Rimini (F3)	2	1	1	0	4	2	+2	4
2	V.d.A. Saint-Christophe (A2)	2	1	0	1	4	5	−1	3
3	Pomigliano (H2)	2	0	1	1	3	4	−1	1

V.d.A. Saint-Christophe (A2)	3–2	(H2) Pomigliano	May 29, 2011
Pomigliano (H2)	1–1	(F3) Rimini	June 5, 2011
Rimini (F3)	3–1	(A2) V.d.A. Saint-Christophe	June 8, 2011

==== Triangular 3 ====
Pos	Team	Pld	W	D	L	GF	GA	GD	Pts
1	Voghera (B2)	2	1	1	0	3	2	+1	4
2	Sansepolcro (E3)	2	0	2	0	5	5	0	2
3	Forza e Coraggio (I2)	2	0	1	1	3	4	−1	1

Voghera (B2)	1–0	(I2) Forza e Coraggio	May 29, 2011
Forza e Coraggio (I2)	3–3	(E3) Sansepolcro	June 4, 2011
Sansepolcro (E3)	2–2	(B2) Voghera	June 8, 2011

=== Semi-finals Promotion ===
First legs played June 15, 2011; return legs played June 19, 2011

Turris qualified directly as finalist of Coppa Italia Serie D, because the winner, Perugia, was directly promoted as Girone winner

Team 1	Agg.	Team 2	1st leg	2nd leg
Rimini (F3)	5–1	(B2) Voghera	4–1	1–0
SandonàJesolo (C4)	2–2(a)	(Cup Finalist) Turris	2–2	0–0

=== Final Promotion ===
Played on June 25, 2011

- On neutral ground at Terni, Stadio Libero Liberati

Team 1	Score	Team 2
Rimini (F3)	0–0(pen 3–1)	(Cup Finalist) Turris

Winner: Rimini

== Relegation playout ==
Played on May 22 & May 29, 2011
In case of aggregate tie score, higher classified team wins, without extra time being played
Team highlighted in green is saved, other is relegated to Eccellenza

Team 1	Agg.	Team 2	1st leg	2nd leg
Albese (A17)	5–2	(A16) Rivoli	3–0	2–2
Trento (B16)	1–8	(B13) Castellana	0–5	1–3
Caratese (B15)	5–2	(B14) Villafranca	5–1	0–1
Concordia (C16)	3–2	(C13) Montecchio Maggiore	1–1	2–1
Opitergina (C15)	2–2	(C14) Belluno	0–0	2–2
Carpenedolo (D15)	1–4	(D14) Mobilieri Ponsacco	1–2	0–2
Deruta (E16)	3–1	(E13) Sestese	3–1	0–0
Montevarchi (E15)	0–3	(E14) Orvietana	0–0	0–3
Sanluri (G16)	1–1	(G13) Cynthia	0–1	1–0
Guidonia (G15)	4–6	(G14) Astrea	1–3	3–3
Angri (H16)	3–1	(H13) Sant'Antonio Abate	1–1	2–0
Pisticci (H15)	1–2	(H14) Battipagliese	0–1	1–1
Rossanese (I17)	0–0	(I14) Noto	0–0	0–0
Modica (I16)	3–3	(I15) Marsala	2–1	1–2
