= Thierry Ekwalla =

Cameroonian footballer

Personal information
- Date of birth: 28 November 1983 (age 42)
- Place of birth: Douala, Cameroon
- Height: 1.77 m (5 ft 10 in)
- Position: Midfielder

Youth career
- Treviso

Senior career*
| Years | Team | Apps | (Gls) |
| 2002–2004 | Città di Jesolo | 15 | (1) |
| 2004–2006 | Čukarički | 12 | (0) |
| 2006–2007 | Universitatea Cluj | 0 | (0) |
| 2007 | Râmnicu Vâlcea | | |
| 2008 | Câmpina | 9 | (0) |
| 2008–2009 | San Donà Jesolo | 17 | (0) |
| 2009–2011 | Città di Concordia | 36 | (4) |
| 2011–2012 | Opitergina | 27 | (3) |
| 2012–2014 | Gruaro | | |
| 2015 | La Salute | | |
| 2016 | San Donà Jesolo | | |
- * Club domestic league appearances and goals

Thierry Ekwalla (born 28 November 1983) is a Cameroonian footballer who played in Italy, Serbia and Romania. He also holds Italian citizenship.

== Career ==
Ekwalla left Cameroon at age 17 and arrived to Italy first playing in the youth team of Treviso F.B.C. and then, as a senior, between 2002 and 2004, with U.S. Città di Jesolo. Ekwalla then signed a professional contract in Serbia with FK Čukarički and played in the 2004-05 season. In summer 2005 he had trials at French side Olympique de Marseille and Romanian side CSM Jiul Petroșani but Čukarički was asking for a too high price. He played the season 2005–06 in Serbian second level, the Serbian First League. A year later, he became free-agent and moved to Romania signing with FC Universitatea Cluj. Later he also played in Romania with CSM Râmnicu Vâlcea and FCM Câmpina.

He returned to Italy in 2008 to play with S.S.D. Calcio San Donà for one season. He then played two seasons with A.C.D. Città di Concordia.

In season 2011–12 he played with U.S. Opitergina in the Eccellenza Veneto.

In season 2012–13, after making 6 appearances with Città di Concordia, he left the club and joined A.C.D. Gruaro also playing in Eccellenza Veneto league. Gruaro got relegated, but Ekwalla still played till the winter-break of the 2014–15 season when he moved to La Salute. A year later, in the following winter-break, he moved to Jesolo.
