= Eccellenza Veneto =

- Organising body: Lega Nazionale Dilettanti
- Founded: 1991
- Country: Italy
- Confederation: UEFA
- Divisions: 2
- Number of clubs: 36
- Promotion to: Serie D
- Relegation to: Promozione Veneto
- League cup: Coppa Italia Dilettanti
- Current champions: Unione La Rocca Altavilla (Group A); Conegliano (Group B) (2024–25)
- Most championships: Villafranca, Portogruaro (3 titles each)
- Website: https://www.lnd.it

Eccellenza Veneto is the regional Eccellenza football division for clubs in Veneto, Italy. It is competed amongst 32 teams, in two different groups (A and B). The winners of the Groups are promoted to Serie D. The club who finishes second also have the chance to gain promotion, they are entered into a national play-off which consists of two rounds.

== Champions ==
Here are the past champions of the Veneto Eccellenza, organised into their respective group.

=== Group A ===
- 1991–92 Contarina
- 1992–93 Donada
- 1993–94 Luparense
- 1994–95 Lendinarese
- 1995–96 Giorgianna
- 1996–97 Bassano Virtus
- 1997–98 Montecchio Maggiore
- 1998–99 Chioggia Sottomarina
- 1999–2000 Tezze sul Brenta
- 2000–01 Cologna Veneta
- 2001–02 Lonigo
- 2002–03 Sambonifacese
- 2003–04 Union Vigontina
- 2004–05 Este
- 2005–06 Virtus Verona
- 2006–07 Domegliara
- 2007–08 Somma
- 2008–09 Villafranca
- 2009–10 Legnago Salus
- 2010–11 Sarego
- 2011–12 Trissino
- 2012–13 Marano
- 2013–14 Villafranca
- 2014–15 Campodarsego
- 2015–16 Adriese
- 2016–17 Ambrosiana
- 2017–18 Cartigliano
- 2018–19 Vigasio
- 2019–20 Sona
- 2020–21 San Martino Speme
- 2021–22 Villafranca
- 2022–23 Clivense
- 2023–24 Vigasio
- 2024–25 Unione La Rocca Altavilla

=== Group B ===
- 1991–92 Miranese
- 1992–93 Montebelluna
- 1993–94 Schio
- 1994–95 Mestre
- 1995–96 Portogruaro
- 1996–97 Martellago
- 1997–98 Portogruaro
- 1998–99 La Marenese
- 1999–2000 Bessica
- 2000–01 Cordignano
- 2001–02 Conegliano Calcio
- 2002–03 Gemeaz Cusin San Polo
- 2003–04 Montebelluna
- 2004–05 Eurocalcio
- 2005–06 Union Quinto
- 2006–07 San Donà
- 2007–08 Sagittaria Julia
- 2008–09 Adriese
- 2009–10 Opitergina
- 2010–11 Delta
- 2011–12 Clodiense
- 2012–13 Vittorio Veneto
- 2013–14 Union Pro Mogliano
- 2014–15 Calvi Noale
- 2015–16 Pievigina
- 2016–17 Liventina
- 2017–18 Sandonà
- 2018–19 Luparense
- 2019–20 San Giorgio Sedico
- 2020–21 Spinea
- 2021–22 Portogruaro
- 2022–23 Treviso
- 2023–24 Calvi Noale
- 2024–25 Conegliano
