= Nicola Campedelli =

Italian football player and manager (born 1979)

Personal information
- Date of birth: 7 February 1979 (age 47)
- Place of birth: Cesena, Italy
- Height: 1.80 m (5 ft 11 in)
- Position: Midfielder

Team information
- Current team: Forlì (head coach)

Senior career*
Years	Team	Apps	(Gls)
1997–2000	Cesena	34	(4)
1998–1999	→ Castel San Pietro (loan)	32	(3)
2000–2002	Salernitana	67	(4)
2002–2007	Modena	127	(12)
2007–2009	Cesena	16	(0)

International career
2000	Italy U20	5	(1)
2000–2001	Italy U21	8	(0)

Managerial career
- 2009–2010: Cesenatico
- 2010–2012: Bellaria
- 2012: Cesena
- 2014–2015: Ribelle
- 2015: Correggese
- 2016: Parma (assistant)
- 2017–2018: Romagna Centro
- 2018: Forlì
- 2019: Forlì
- 2020: Sangiustese
- 2020–2021: Savignanese
- 2021–2026: Cesena (youth)
- 2026–: Forlì
- * Club domestic league appearances and goals

Nicola Campedelli (born 7 February 1979) is an Italian football coach and former player who is the head coach of Serie C Group B club Forlì.

== Playing career ==
A midfielder, Campedelli played with Cesena from 1997 to 2000.

In 2007, when at Cesena, he suffered a Lisfranc fracture which he never fully recovered from, making only a handful in the 2007–08 Serie B season, forcing him to announce his retirement from football in June 2009. Nicola is a brother of Cesena president Igor, which Cesena bought Nicola from Modena for €650,000 in co-ownership deal in 5-year contract. In June 2009 Modena gave up the remain 50% registration rights, as Nicola retired at the end of season.

== Coaching career ==
For the 2009–10 season, Campedelli was coach of Cesenatico promoted to Serie D. He took the UEFA B License course from 20 July to 6 August 2009.

In the two next seasons he has been the coach of Bellaria in Lega Pro Seconda Divisione saved for all two seasons. He obtained the necessary coaching license for that level (UEFA A License) in June 2011.

Campedelli was hired by Cesena on 25 May 2012, just weeks after the club relegated to Serie B as caretaker. FIGC gave special permission to him despite not a holder of UEFA Pro License. He was sacked on 10 September after three Serie B matches, from his brother Igor, the president of club and replaced by Pierpaolo Bisoli. Campedelli obtained the Pro License in July 2013.
