= Boubacarr Sambou =

Italian footballer (born 1948)

Personal information
- Date of birth: 1 January 2000 (age 26)
- Place of birth: Sifoe, The Gambia
- Position: Midfielder

Team information
- Current team: San Marino

Senior career*
Years	Team	Apps	(Gls)
2017–2018	Salandra		
2018–2020	Picerno	23	(1)
2020	→ Fidelis Andria (loan)	8	(1)
2020–2021	Rimini	15	(1)
2021	Casertana	3	(0)
2022	Gladiator	13	(0)
2022–2024	Legnago	51	(8)
2024	Ancona	8	(1)
2024–2025	Piacenza	7	(0)
2025	Sanremese	9	(0)
2025–	San Marino	13	(3)
- * Club domestic league appearances and goals as of 1 March 2026

Boubacarr Sambou (born 1 January 2000) is a Gambian footballer who plays as a midfielder for Sammarinese club San Marino that plays in the Italian fourth-tier Serie D.

== Early life ==
Sambou worked as a bricklayer in Senegal.

== Career ==
Sambou started his career with Italian side Picerno, helping the club win the league.

== Style of play ==
Sambou mainly operated as a midfielder or winger.

== Personal life ==
Sambou has been a supporter of Italian Serie A side Milan.
