= ASD FC SS Nola 1925 =

Italian football club

S.S. Nola 1925
- Full name: Associazione Sportiva Dilettantistica; S.S. Nola 1925
- Founded: 1925 (as U.S. Nola); 1990 (as S.S. Nola); 1996 (as Virtus Nola 1925); 1997 (as Sanità Nola); 1998 (as Comprensorio Nola); 2002 (as Sporting Nola); 2004 (as Boys Nola 2004); 2007 (as Atletico Nola); 2011 (as Nuvla San Felice); 2012 (as Real S.M. Hyria); 2014 (as A.S.D. S.S. Nola 1925)
- Ground: Sporting Club, Nola, Italy
- Capacity: 1,296
- Manager: Francesco Farina
- League: Eccellenza Campania A
- 2023–24: 3rd, Eccellenza Campania A
Home colours	Away colours

A.S.D. S.S. Nola 1925 is an Italian association football club based in Nola, Campania. Currently it is the main team of Nola and plays in the fifth-tier Eccellenza.

== History ==
=== The football in Nola ===
==== The previous clubs ====
===== S.S. Nola =====
The origins of football in Nola go back to 1924 when was founded Unione Sportiva Nola, changing its name to Società Sportiva Nola in 1990. It has played in Serie C1 and Serie C2. In the summer 1996, has filed for bankruptcy.

===== From Virtus Nola 1925 to Comprensorio Nola =====
Nola was refounded in 1996 as Virtus Nola 1925 and was renamed in 1997 and in 1998 respectively Sanità Nola and Comprensorio Nola. In the 2000–01 season the club won the Coppa Italia Dilettanti, obtaining direct promotion to Serie D, after having won the Regional Coppa Italia Campania. In 2002 it transferred its sports title of Serie D to S.S. Juve Stabia.

===== Sporting Nola =====
A.S.D. Sporting Nola was founded in summer 2002 by Nolan football fans, as F.C. Sporting Nola. The team currently plays in Promozione Campania.

===== From Boys Nola to Atletico Vesuvio =====
Boys Nola 2004 was founded in summer 2004. Thanks to the merger with Atletico, the club took part directly to 2007–08 Eccellenza Campania with the new name of A.S.D. Atletico Nola. Since the season 2011–12 it plays in Eccellenza Campania in San Giorgio a Cremano. In the summer 2012 the club was renamed A.S.D. Atletico Vesuvio thus ceasing every bond of the city of Nola.

===== Nuvla San Felice =====
In summer 2011 G.S.D. Nuvla San Felice was born after the merger of G.S. Capriatese (based in Capriati a Volturno and playing in Serie D) and the football academy San Feliciano of San Felice a Cancello. In summer 2012 its sports title of Serie D was transferred to Gladiator and so it was dissolved.

==== Real Sm Hyria ====
In the 2012–13 season the main football club of the city has been A.S.D. Real S.M. Hyria Nola 2012, thanks to President Rosario Gaglione, who has transferred here the former Turris from the city of Torre del Greco.

In summer 2013 Gaglione has given the team sport title to F.C. Real Città di Vico Equense coming so excluded from Italian football. However a new club was refounded soon after, restarting in Promozione. It took the name ASD SS Nola 1925.

Former crest of Real Hyria Nola

== Colors and badge ==
The colors of Sporting Nola, the main team of Nola, are white and black, like those of the historic S.S. Nola.

== Former players ==
- (Italy) Gennaro Iezzo (as Nuvla San Felice)
