= Salvatore Papa =

Italian footballer

Personal information
- Date of birth: 27 April 1990 (age 36)
- Place of birth: Cosenza, Italy
- Height: 1.78 m (5 ft 10 in)
- Position: Midfielder

Team information
- Current team: Castelnuovo
- Number: 27

Youth career
- Rende
- 2007–2009: Inter Milan
- 2008–2009: → Triestina (loan)
- 2009–2010: Chievo

Senior career*
Years	Team	Apps	(Gls)
2007	Rende	1	(0)
2010–2012	Foligno	49	(0)
2012–2014	Santarcangelo	46	(4)
2014–2015	Aversa Normanna	15	(1)
2015	Vigor Lamezia	13	(0)
2015–2016	Rende	28	(5)
2016–2017	Cuneo	28	(6)
2017–2021	Ravenna	114	(10)
2021–2022	Ancona-Matelica	20	(0)
2022–2023	Gelbison	30	(0)
2023–2024	APC Chions	22	(0)
2024–2026	USD Breno	58	(2)
2026–	Castelnuovo		
- * Club domestic league appearances and goals as of 15 October 2026

Salvatore Papa (born 27 April 1990) is an Italian footballer who plays as a midfielder for Castelnuovo.

== Club career ==
Born in Cosenza, Calabria, Papa made his league debut for Serie C2 team Rende on 14 January 2007 as substitute. At the end of the season the team relegated, re-located to Cosenza and merged with AS Cosenza Calcio and became Fortitudo Cosenza. In June 2007 he was loaned to Inter's Primavera youth team along with Francesco D'Angelo. In July 2008, Inter decided to buy him outright and loaned him to Triestina. He spent 2009–10 season at Chievo for free.

In July 2010 he left for Prima Divisione club Foligno along with Jacopo Fiorucci from Chievo reserve. The club signed Ivan Merli Sala and Papa in co-ownership deal from Chievo for a peppercorn of €100 each. He was the regular of the team. In June 2012 Chievo bought back Papa but he was transferred to Santarcangelo.

On 2 July 2021 he signed with Ancona-Matelica.

On 20 September 2022, Papa moved to Gelbison.
