= Davis Mensah =

Italian footballer (born 1991)

Personal information
- Date of birth: 2 August 1991 (age 35)
- Place of birth: Bussolengo, Italy
- Height: 1.86 m (6 ft 1 in)
- Position: Forward

Team information
- Current team: Cittadella
- Number: 9

Senior career*
Years	Team	Apps	(Gls)
2010–2011	CastelnuovoSandrà	32	(7)
2011–2017	Virtus Verona	199	(47)
2017–2021	Triestina	123	(19)
2021–2022	Pordenone	15	(0)
2022–2026	Mantova	139	(17)
2026–	Cittadella	5	(0)
- * Club domestic league appearances and goals as of 26 September 2026

Davis Mensah (born 2 August 1991) is an Italian footballer who plays for Serie C Group A club Cittadella.

== Club career ==
He played 6 out of the first 7 seasons of his senior career in the fourth-tier Serie D.

He made his professional Lega Pro 2 debut for Virtus Verona on 1 September 2013 in a game against Bra.

On 1 July 2021, he signed a two-year contract with Serie B club Pordenone. He made his Serie B debut for Pordenone on 29 August 2021 against SPAL.

On 16 August 2022, Mensah moved to Mantova in Serie C.
