= 2009–10 Eccellenza =

This is a list of division winners and playoff matches in the regionally organized Eccellenza 2009–2010, which is the 6th level of Italian football.

== Framework national summary ==
Region/Girone	Promoted in Serie D	National Playoffs	Promotion to Serie D after the play-offs
Abruzzo	Teramo	Mosciano	-
Basilicata	Fortis Murgia	Angelo Cristofaro	-
Calabria	Omega Bagaladi	Scalea	-
Campania Girone A	Atletico Nola	Arzanese	-
Campania Girone B	Battipagliese	Ebolitana	Ebolitana
Emilia-Romagna Girone A	G.S. Bagnolese	Virtus Pavullese	-
Emilia-Romagna Girone B	Forlì	Cesenatico	Cesenatico
Friuli-Venezia Giulia	Torviscosa	Kras	Kras
Lazio Girone A	Fidene	Anziolavinio	Anziolavinio
Lazio Girone B	Zagarolo	Cavese	-
Liguria	Sanremese	Caperanese	Caperanese
Lombardia Girone A	Calcio Saronno	Verbano	-
Lombardia Girone B	Seregno	Folgore Verano	-
Lombardia Girone C	Rudianese	Castiglione Savoia	Castiglione Savoia
Marche	Sambenedettese	Jesina	-
Molise	Venafro Capriatese (as finalist of Coppa Italia Dilettanti)	Real Isernia	-
Piemonte Girone A	Saint-Christophe	Santhià	-
Piemonte Girone B	Asti	Novese	-
Puglia	Nardò	Fortis Trani	Fortis Trani
Sardegna	Porto Torres	Castiadas	-
Sicilia Girone A	Marsala	Kamarat	-
Sicilia Girone B	Acireale	Noto	-
Toscana Girone A	Tuttocuoio	Camaiore	-
Toscana Girone B	Pianese	Pistoiese	-
Trentino-Alto Adige	Trento	Fersina	-
Umbria	Todi	Voluntas Spoleto	-
Veneto Girone A	Legnago Salus	Castelnuovo Sandrà	-
Veneto Girone B	Opitergina	Sottomarina Lido	-

== Eccellenza Abruzzo ==
	Teams	Pt	G	W	D	L	GF	GA	GD	Qualification or Relegation
1.	Teramo (C)	73	34	22	8	4	54	23	+31	Promotion to the Serie D
2.	Montesilvano	64^{1}	34	19	9	6	49	31	+18	Eliminated in Regional play-off
3.	Mosciano	62	34	17	10	7	47	23	+24	Eliminated in National play-off
4.	Castel di Sangro	58	34	16	10	8	39	22	+17	Eliminated in Regional play-off
5.	Alba Adriatica	55	34	14	13	7	38	24	+14	Eliminated in Regional play-off
6.	San Nicolò	48	34	12	12	10	53	39	+14	
7.	Pineto	43	34	10	13	11	24	31	−7	
8.	Cologna Paese	41	34	8	17	9	36	33	+3	
9.	Sporting Scalo	41	34	10	11	13	34	48	−14	
10.	Francavilla	41	34	11	8	15	39	46	−7	
11.	Angizia Luco	40	34	9	13	12	37	42	−5	
12.	Rosetana	40	34	10	10	14	34	43	−9	
13.	Montorio	39	34	8	15	11	30	30	+0	
14.	Spal Lanciano	37	34	8	13	13	31	38	−7	Winner of relegation play-off
15.	Guardiagrele	35	34	8	11	15	22	32	−10	Winner of relegation play-off
16.	Penne	35	34	7	14	13	33	49	−16	Relegation to the Promozione
17.	San Nicola Sulmona	34	34	8	10	16	30	49	−19	Relegation to the Promozione
18.	Notaresco	26	34	4	14	16	25	49	−24	Relegation to the Promozione

1. Montesilvano deducted one point.

=== Play-off ===
Semi-finals

	Results
Alba Adriatica	1–1	Montesilvano
Castel di Sangro	1–1	Mosciano
Montesilvano	1–2	Alba Adriatica
Mosciano	1–0	Castel di Sangro

Final

	Result
Mosciano	3–2	Alba Adriatica

Mosciano qualified to the National play-off.

=== Play-out ===
	Results
San Nicola Sulmona	0–1	Spal Lanciano
Penne	0–0	Guardiagrele
Spal Lanciano	1–1	San Nicola Sulmona
Guardiagrele	0 – 0 h.c.	Penne

San Nicola Sulmona and Penne relegated to the Promozione.

== Eccellenza Basilicata ==
	Teams	Pt	G	W	D	L	GF	GA	GD	Qualification or Relegation
1.	Fortis Murgia (C)	64	30	18	10	2	63	19	+44	Promotion to the Serie D
2.	Angelo Cristofaro	60	30	18	6	6	59	24	+35	Eliminated from National play-off
3.	Ruggiero Valdiano	54	30	16	6	8	56	26	+30	Eliminated from Regional play-off
4.	Atella M. Vulture	52	30	15	7	8	59	28	+31	Eliminated from Regional play-off
5.	Ricigliano	52	30	14	10	6	44	18	+26	Eliminated from Regional play-off
6.	Borussia Pleiade	50	30	15	5	10	48	28	+20	
7.	Viggiano	46	30	12	10	8	48	33	+15	
8.	Murese Aurora	44	30	11	11	8	43	26	+7	
9.	Vultur Rionero	42	30	12	6	12	49	40	+9	
10.	Policoro	40	30	10	10	10	42	29	+13	
11.	Real Tolve	38	30	10	8	12	48	35	+13	
12.	Banzi	37	30	9	10	11	44	44	+0	Relegation to the Promozione
13.	Picerno	32	30	9	5	16	45	51	−6	Winner of relegation play-off
14.	Avigliano	27	30	6	9	15	33	41	−8	Winner of relegation play-off
15.	Ferrandina	19^{1}	30	5	5	20	29	96	−67	Winner of relegation play-off
16.	Irsinese	2^{1}	30	1	0	29	7	179	−172	Relegation to the Promozione

1. Ferrandina and Irsinese deducted one point.

=== Play-off ===
Semi-finals

	Results
Ricigliano	2–5	Angelo Cristofaro
Atella M. Vulture	3–2	Ruggiero Valdiano
Angelo Cristofaro	2–3	Ricigliano
Ruggiero Valdiano	1–1	Atella M. Vulture

Final

	Result
Angelo Cristofaro	1–1 h.c.	Atella M. Vulture

Angelo Cristofaro qualified to the National play-off.

=== Play-out ===
	Results
Ferrandina	2–2	Banzi
Avigliano	1–1	Az Picerno
Banzi	0–1	Ferrandina
Az Picerno	1–3	Avigliano

Final

	Result
Banzi	2–3 (aet)	Az Picerno

Banzi relegated to the Promozione.

== Eccellenza Calabria ==
	Teams	Pt	G	W	D	L	GF	GA	GD	Qualification or Relegation
1.	Omega Bagaladi (C)	56	30	16	8	6	45	26	+19	Promotion to the Serie D
2.	Comprensorio Montalto Uffugo	53	30	15	8	7	44	27	+17	Eliminated in Regional play-off
3.	Acri	51^{2}	30	15	8	7	40	22	+18	Eliminated in Regional play-off
4.	Palmese	51	30	14	9	7	43	26	+17	Eliminated in Regional play-off
5.	Scalea	50^{1}	30	14	9	7	35	22	+13	Eliminated in National play-off
6.	Rende	50	30	13	11	6	30	17	+13	
7.	Nuova Gioiese	46	30	11	13	6	31	22	+9	
8.	Melitese	43	30	12	7	11	36	31	+5	
9.	Bovalinese	41	30	10	11	9	22	25	−3	
10.	Soverato V.	38	30	10	8	12	32	33	−1	
11.	Isola Capo Rizzuto	36	30	10	6	14	21	29	−8	
12.	Cutro	35	30	9	8	13	33	37	−4	
13.	Roccella	31	30	6	13	11	22	23	−1	Winner of relegation play-off
14.	Città Amantea	28	30	5	13	12	26	47	−21	Relegation to the Promozione
15.	Gallicese	22	30	4	10	16	25	48	−23	Relegation to the Promozione
16.	Praia	12^{1}	30	3	4	23	22	72	−50	Relegation to the Promozione

1. Scalea and Praia deducted one point.
2. Acri deducted one point.

=== Tie-Break for 5th position ===
	Result
Scalea	2–1	Rende

=== Play-off ===
Semi-finals

	Results
Scalea	1–1	Montalto Uffugo
Palmese	2–2	Acri
Montalto Uffugo	1–3	Scalea
Acri	1–0	Palmese

Final

	Results
Scalea	3–1	Acri
Acri	0–0	Scalea

Scalea qualified to the National play-off.

=== Play-out ===
	Results
Città di Amantea	1–2	Roccella
Roccella	1–1	Città di Amantea

Città di Amantea relegated to the Promozione.

== Eccellenza Campania ==
=== Girone A ===
	Teams	Pt	G	W	D	L	GF	GA	GD	Qualification or Relegation
1.	Atletico Nola (C)	61	28	18	7	3	66	26	+13	Promotion to the Serie D
2.	Internapoli Camaldoli	57	28	16	9	3	58	24	+34	Eliminated in Regional play-off
3.	Arzanese	56	28	17	5	6	58	27	+31	Promotion to the Serie D ^{2}
4.	CTL Campania^{1}	48	28	13	9	6	30	17	+13	
5.	Quarto	48	28	14	6	8	45	38	+7	Eliminated in Regional play-off
6.	Libertas Stabia	46	28	13	7	8	50	46	+4	
7.	Gladiator	39	28	9	12	7	33	30	+3	
8.	Stasia Soccer	32	28	7	11	10	31	42	−11	
9.	Giugliano	31	28	7	10	11	20	29	−9	
10.	Monte di Procida Cappella	30	28	9	3	16	37	42	−5	
11.	Alba Sannio	28	28	5	13	10	26	37	−11	
12.	Virtus Volla	27	28	7	6	15	20	28	−8	
13.	Rita Ercolano	27	28	7	6	15	28	46	−18	Winner of relegation play-off
14.	Parete	25	28	5	10	13	19	44	−25	Relegation to the Promozione
15.	Real Boschese	16	28	4	4	20	19	64	−45	Relegation to the Promozione
16.	Savoia	Retired								Relegation to the Promozione

1. The CTL Campania, finished fourth, did not qualify for the playoffs since the separation from the third in the standings, the Arzanese is more than five points. Discourse rather than reaching for the fourth and fifth keeps posting the second, the Internapoli, less than 10 points.
2. Arzanese promoted to fill a vacancy in the Serie D.

==== Play-off ====
Semi-final

	Result
Internapoli Camaldoli	0–0 h.c.	Quarto

Final

	Result
Internapoli Camaldoli	0–1	Arzanese

Arzanese qualified to the National play-off.

==== Play-out ====
	Result
Rita Ercolano	1–0	Parete

Parete relegated to the Promozione.

=== Girone B ===
	Teams	Pt	G	W	D	L	GF	GA	GD	Qualification or Relegation
1.	Battipagliese (C)	72	30	22	6	2	44	14	+40	Promotion to the Serie D
2.	Ebolitana	69	30	21	6	3	69	30	+39	Winner of National play-off
3.	Vis Nocera Superiore	59	30	18	5	7	44	35	+9	Eliminated in Regional play-off
4.	Ippogrifo Sarno^{1}	49	30	15	4	11	43	39	+4	
5.	Agropoli^{1}	46	30	13	7	10	38	32	+6	
6.	Campagna	38	30	11	5	14	39	43	−4	
7.	Gelbison	38	30	10	8	12	41	45	−4	
8.	Real Poseidon	37	30	10	7	13	36	42	−6	
9.	Serino	37	30	9	10	11	35	42	−7	
10.	Castel San Giorgio	36	30	9	9	12	22	26	−4	
11.	G. Ferrini Benevento	35	30	9	8	13	32	36	−4	
12.	Baia	34	30	7	13	10	37	36	+1	Relegation to the Promozione
13.	Solofra	31	30	5	16	9	32	33	−1	Winner of relegation play-off
14.	Striano	30	30	7	9	14	32	50	−18	Relegation to the Promozione
15.	Real Irpina	27	30	7	6	17	36	47	−11	Winner of relegation play-off
16.	Felice Scandone Montella	22	30	6	3	21	35	64	−29	Relegation to the Promozione

1. Ippogrifo Sarno and Agropoli not admitted to the regional playoffs since the separations in the second and third place respectively are greater than 10 and 5 points.

==== Play-off ====
Final

	Result
Ebolitana	0–0 h.c.	Vis Nocera Superiore

Ebolitana qualified to the National play-off.

==== Play-out ====
	Results
Baia 2006	1–3	Real Irpinia
Solofra	1–1 h.c.	Striano

Baia 2006 and Striano relegated to the Promozione.

== Eccellenza Emilia-Romagna ==
=== Girone A ===
	Teams	Pt	G	V	N	P	GF	GS	GD	Qualification or Relegation
1.	G.S. Bagnolese (C)	72	34	21	9	4	67	28	+39	Promotion to the Serie D
2.	Virtus Pavullese	72	34	22	6	6	58	34	+24	Promotion to the Serie D^{1}
3.	Fidenza	71	34	19	11	4	59	28	+31	
4.	Pallavicino	65	34	18	11	5	63	40	+23	
5.	San Felice	65	34	19	8	7	53	32	+21	
6.	Colorno	51	34	13	12	9	49	35	+14	
7.	Polinago	47	34	13	8	13	39	45	−6	
8.	Terme Monticelli	44	34	11	11	12	42	41	+1	
9.	Scandiano	43	34	11	10	13	36	37	−1	
10.	Traversetolo	42	34	12	6	16	40	46	−6	
11.	Solierese	42	34	11	9	14	29	40	−11	
12.	Crevalcore	41	34	10	11	13	38	44	−6	
13.	Meletolese	41	34	10	11	13	29	39	−10	Relegation to the Promozione
14.	Formigine	37	34	8	13	13	31	45	−14	Winner of relegation play-off
15.	Reno Centese	36	34	9	9	16	40	50	−10	Relegation to the Promozione^{1}
16.	UC Casalese	33	34	9	6	19	36	49	−13	Winner of relegation play-off
17.	Fiorano	21	34	4	9	21	32	55	−33	Relegation to the Promozione
18.	Malba	16	34	4	4	26	29	80	−51	Relegation to the Promozione

1. Reno Centese reprieved from relegation to fill a vacancy.
2. Virtus Pavullese promoted to fill a vacancy in the Serie D.

==== Play-off for first place ====
	Result
Bagnolese	1–0	Virtus Pavullese

Bagnolese promoted to the Serie D while Virtus Pavullese qualified to the National play-off.

==== Play-out ====
	Results
Casalese	1–0	Meletolese
Reno Centese	0–0	Formigine
Meletolese	1–3	Casalese
Formigine	2–0	Reno Centese

Meletolese and Reno Centese relegated to the Promozione.

=== Girone B ===
	Teams	Pt	G	V	N	P	GF	GS	GD	Qualification or Relegation
1.	Forlì (C)	76	32	23	7	2	77	24	+53	Promotion in the Serie D
2.	Cesenatico	68	32	20	8	4	54	30	+24	Winner of National play-off
3.	Copparese	55	32	14	13	5	47	39	+8	
4.	Massalombarda	54	32	13	15	4	48	37	+11	
5.	Cervia	46	32	11	13	8	45	42	+3	
6.	Il Senio	45	32	12	9	11	44	35	+11	
7.	Savignanese	45	32	10	15	7	46	43	+3	
8.	Imolese	44	32	12	8	12	43	45	−2	
9.	Del Conca	42	32	10	12	10	41	37	+4	
10.	Faenza	40	32	8	16	8	28	25	+3	
11.	Sasso Marconi	38	32	8	14	10	35	36	−1	
12.	Loops Ribelle	38	32	9	11	12	27	34	−7	
13.	Stuoie Baracca Lugo	33	32	7	12	13	30	35	−5	Relegation to the Promozione
14.	Comacchio Lidi	29	32	5	14	13	30	41	−11	Relegation to the Promozione^{1}
15.	Torconca Cattolica	27	32	6	9	17	32	57	−25	Winner of relegation play-off
16.	Verucchio	25	32	5	10	17	31	49	−18	Winner of relegation play-off
17.	Argentana	14	32	2	8	22	20	67	−47	Relegation to the Promozione
18.	Boca San Lazzaro	Retired								Relegation to the Promozione

1. Comacchio Lidi reprieved from relegation to fill a vacancy.

==== Play-out ====
	Results
Verucchio	0–0	Stuoie Baracca Lugo
Torconca	1–0	Comacchio Lidi
Stuoie Baracca Lugo	1–2	Verucchio
Comacchio Lidi	1–2	Torconca

Stuoie Baracca Lugo and Comacchio Lidi relegated to the Promozione.

== Eccellenza Friuli-Venezia Giulia ==
	Teams	Pt	G	W	D	L	GF	GA	GD	Qualification or Relegation
1.	Torviscosa (C)	62	30	18	8	4	38	14	+24	Promotion to the Serie D
2.	Kras Repen	60	30	19	3	8	54	27	+27	Winner of National play-off
3.	Pro Cervignano	54	30	15	9	6	36	22	+14	
4.	Virtus Corno	44	30	10	14	6	33	30	+3	
5.	Tricesimo	41	30	10	11	9	24	26	−2	
6.	Fincantieri	40	30	9	13	8	36	28	+8	
7.	San Luigi	40	30	9	13	8	41	36	+5	
8.	ASD Fontanafredda	40	30	10	10	10	29	24	+5	
9.	Azzanese	40	30	10	10	10	39	37	+2	
10.	Muggia	40	30	10	10	10	33	33	+0	
11.	Pro Fagagna	39	30	9	12	9	30	28	+2	
12.	Tolmezzo	36	30	8	12	10	27	27	+0	Winner of relegation play-off
13.	Monfalcone	33	30	7	12	11	22	26	−4	Winner of relegation play-off
14.	Sevegliano	30	30	6	12	12	20	36	−16	Relegation to the Promozione
15.	Rivignano	23	30	6	5	19	19	50	−31	Relegation to the Promozione
16.	Sarone	17	30	3	8	19	21	58	−37	Relegation to the Promozione

=== Play-out ===
	Results
Rivignano	1–2	Tolmezzo
Sevegliano	0–0	Monfalcone
Tolmezzo	1–1	Rivignano
Monfalcone	1–0	Sevegliano

Rivignano and Sevegliano relegated to the Promozione.

== Eccellenza Lazio ==
=== Girone A ===
	Teams	Pt	G	V	N	P	GF	GS	GD	Qualification or Relegation
1.	Fidene (C)	70	34	21	7	6	69	28	+41	Promotion to the Serie D
2.	Anziolavinio	70	34	21	7	6	70	37	+33	Winner of National play-off
3.	Albalonga	64	34	19	7	8	73	42	+31	
4.	Diana Nemi	56	34	15	11	8	48	37	+11	
5.	Fregene	56	34	15	11	8	60	49	+11	
6.	Real Pomezia	53	34	14	11	9	62	40	+22	
7.	Pescatori Ostia	52	34	14	10	10	44	42	+2	
8.	Ostiamare	51	34	13	12	9	53	40	+13	
9.	Vigor Cisterna	46^{2}	34	14	7	13	53	47	+6	
10.	Civitavecchia	46	34	11	13	10	37	33	+4	
11.	Cecchina Al.Pa.	45	34	11	12	11	39	35	+4	
12.	Giada Maccarese	45	34	11	12	11	54	52	+2	
13.	Fiumicino	44	34	13	5	16	41	56	−15	
14.	Stella Polare	42	34	9	15	10	49	46	+3	Winner of relegation play-off
15.	Monterosi	36	34	9	9	16	33	51	−18	Relegation to the Promozione
16.	Virtus Bagnoregio^{1}	24	34	5	9	20	39	67	−28	Relegation to the Promozione
17.	VJS Velletri	20	34	3	11	20	23	50	−27	Relegation to the Promozione
18.	Tanas Casalotti	9	34	2	3	29	16	111	−95	Relegation to the Promozione

1. Virtus Bagnoregio relegated since the separation in the thirteenth and sixteenth place is greater than 10 points.
2. Vigor Cisterna had 3 points deducted.

==== Play-off for first place ====
	Result
Fidene	0–0 (aet); 4–3 (p)	Anziolavinio

Fidene promoted to the Serie D while Anziolavinio qualified to the National play-off.

==== Play-out ====
	Results
Monterosi	0–1	Stella Polare
Stella Polare	2–0	Monterosi

Monterosi relegated to the Promozione.

=== Girone B ===
	Teams	Pt	G	V	N	P	GF	GS	GD	Qualification or Relegation
1.	Zagarolo (C)	72	34	21	9	4	60	32	+28	Promotion in the Serie D
2.	Cavese 1919	68	34	20	8	6	67	39	+28	Eliminated in National play-off
3.	Lupa Frascati	61	34	16	13	5	59	30	+29	
4.	Palestrina	55	34	15	10	9	49	39	+10	
5.	Formia	52	34	14	10	10	48	43	+5	
6.	Vis Empolitana	50	34	12	14	8	56	40	+16	
7.	Vis Artena	50	34	14	8	12	58	53	+5	
8.	Ceccano	46	34	12	12	10	41	50	−9	
9.	Sora	45	34	12	9	13	51	52	−1	
10.	Nuova Tor Tre Teste	45	34	11	12	11	41	45	−4	
11.	Tor Lupara	42	34	11	9	14	53	55	−2	
12.	Roviano Team Service	42	34	10	12	12	42	51	−9	
13.	La Lucca	39	34	8	15	11	37	40	−3	Winner of relegation play-off
14.	Terracina	38	34	9	11	14	39	42	−3	Winner of relegation play-off
15.	Torrenova	35	34	9	8	17	45	61	−16	Relegation to the Promozione
16.	Colleferro	34	34	8	10	16	40	55	−15	Relegation to the Promozione
17.	Villanova	30	34	6	12	16	27	42	−15	Relegation to the Promozione
18.	Ciampino	17	34	3	8	23	27	70	−43	Relegation to the Promozione

==== Play-out ====
	Results
Colleferro	1–3	La Lucca
Torrenova	0–0	Terracina
La Lucca	2–2	Colleferro
Terracina	1–0	Torrenova

Colleferro and Torrenova relegated to the Promozione.

== Eccellenza Liguria ==
	Teams	Pt	G	V	N	P	GF	GS	GD	Qualification or Relegation
1.	Sanremese (C)	76	30	24	4	2	67	19	+48	Promotion in the Lega Pro Seconda Divisione
2.	Caperanese	69	30	21	6	3	69	27	+42	Winner of National play-off
3.	Sestri Levante	63	30	20	3	7	73	33	+40	
4.	Bogliasco	51	30	15	6	9	59	41	+18	
5.	Rapallo	51	30	16	3	11	47	36	+11	
6.	Busalla	39	30	10	9	11	47	45	+2	
7.	Ventimiglia	39	30	10	9	11	49	49	+0	
8.	Cairese	39	30	10	9	11	45	51	−6	
9.	Pontedecimo	35	30	8	11	11	40	54	−14	
10.	Fontanabuona	34	30	7	13	10	33	47	−14	
11.	Loanesi	34	30	9	7	14	49	51	−2	
12.	Fezzanese	33	30	8	9	13	36	49	−13	
13.	Rivasamba	32	30	7	11	12	32	44	−12	
14.	Argentina	27	30	6	9	15	34	56	−22	Relegation to the Promozione
15.	Fo.Ce. Vara	20	30	4	8	18	21	60	−39	Relegation to the Promozione
16.	Andora	17	30	4	5	21	36	75	−39	Relegation to the Promozione

== Eccellenza Lombardia ==
=== Girone A ===
	Teams	Pt	G	V	N	P	GF	GS	GD	Qualification or Relegation
1.	Saronno (C)	71	34	21	8	5	69	30	+39	Promotion to the Serie D^{3}
2.	Verbano	67	34	18	13	3	66	41	+25	Eliminated in National play-off
3.	Inveruno^{1}	57	34	16	9	9	52	34	+18	
4.	Insubria	53	34	15	8	11	49	41	+8	
5.	Gavirate	52	34	14	10	10	45	36	+9	
6.	Crescenzago Milano	51	34	14	9	11	49	48	+1	
7.	Fanfulla	49	34	13	10	11	51	43	+12	
8.	Sancolombano	48	34	11	15	8	42	33	+9	
9.	Naviglio Trezzano	46	34	12	10	12	35	33	+2	
10.	Cairate	46	34	13	7	14	36	44	−8	
11.	Sommese	44	34	11	11	12	44	43	+1	
12.	Roncalli	42	34	10	12	12	42	46	−2	
13.	Villanterio	42	34	8	18	8	48	48	+0	
14.	Luino	42	34	9	15	10	45	45	+0	Relegation to the Promozione
15.	Magenta	33	34	7	12	15	34	50	−16	Winner of relegation play-off
16.	Settimo Milanese^{2}	32	34	8	8	18	37	66	−29	Relegation to the Promozione
17.	Tribiano	25	34	6	7	21	32	57	−25	Relegation to the Promozione
18.	Bareggio San Martino	23	34	5	8	21	35	69	−34	Relegation to the Promozione

1. The Inveruno, finished third, did not qualify for the playoffs since the separation from the second in the standings, Verbano is more than nine points.
2. Settimo Milanese did not qualify for the playout since the separation from the thirteenth in the standings, Villanterio is more than nine points.
3. Saronno failed to gain promotion and its place was taken by Gallaratese.

==== Tie-Break for 13th position ====
	Result
Luino	1–2 (aet)	Villanterio

==== Play-out ====
	Results
Magenta	5–0	Luino
Luino	1–0	Magenta

=== Girone B ===
	Teams	Pt	G	V	N	P	GF	GS	GD	Qualification or Relegation
1.	Seregno (C)	76	32	23	7	2	64	13	+51	Promotion to the Serie D
2.	Mapello	66	32	20	6	6	57	22	+35	Eliminated in Regional play-off
3.	Folgore Verano	62	32	17	11	4	60	30	+30	Eliminated in National play-off
4.	Giana Erminio	55	32	14	13	5	36	23	+13	
5.	Merate	52	32	13	13	6	52	39	+13	
6.	Trevigliese	49	32	13	10	9	40	38	+2	
7.	Vimercatese Oreno	48	32	13	9	10	34	31	+3	
8.	Villa d'Almè	43	32	11	10	11	29	31	−2	
9.	Voluntas Osio Sotto	43	32	12	7	13	45	50	−5	
10.	Mariano	42	32	12	6	14	49	56	−7	
11.	Ciserano	38	32	10	8	14	47	44	+3	
12.	BaSe 96 Seveso	37	32	9	10	13	31	37	−6	
13.	Sondrio	34	32	9	7	16	29	39	−10	Winner of relegation play-off
14.	Nibionno	29	32	8	5	19	42	66	−24	Winner of relegation play-off
15.	Cinisellese	25	32	6	7	19	32	63	−31	Relegation to the Promozione
16.	Città di Meda	25	32	6	7	19	31	61	−30	Relegation to the Promozione
17.	Luciano Manara	19	32	3	10	19	27	62	−35	Relegation to the Promozione
18.	Villa d'Adda	Retired	--	--	--	--	--	--	--	Relegation to the Promozione

==== Play-off ====
	Result
Mapello	0–2	Folgore Verano

==== Play-out ====
	Results
Meda	0–2	Sondrio
Cinisellese	1–1	Nibionno
Sondrio	1–0	Meda
Nibionno	5–0	Cinisellese

=== Girone C ===
	Teams	Pt	G	V	N	P	GF	GS	GD	Qualification or Relegation
1.	Rudianese (C)	64	34	19	7	8	60	34	+26	Promotion to the Serie D
2.	Aurora Seriate	62	34	18	8	8	60	32	+28	Eliminated in Regional play-off
3.	Castegnato	58	34	16	10	8	43	32	+11	Eliminated in Regional play-off
4.	Castiglione Savoia	55	34	14	13	7	53	35	+18	Winner of National play-off
5.	Sarnico	54	34	14	12	8	55	35	+20	Eliminated in Regional play-off
6.	Orsa Corte Franca	52	34	14	10	10	45	33	+12	
7.	USO Calcio	51	34	14	9	11	44	36	+8	
8.	Pro Desenzano	49	34	13	10	11	53	50	+3	
9.	Gandinese	49	34	12	13	9	35	32	+3	
10.	Dellese	49	34	12	13	9	46	46	+0	
11.	Ghisalbese	47	34	11	14	9	47	37	+10	
12.	Grumellese	43	34	10	13	11	39	41	−2	
13.	Chiari	40	34	10	10	14	33	42	−9	Winner of relegation play-off
14.	Valcalepio	39	34	11	6	17	40	53	−13	Winner of relegation play-off
15.	Volta	38	34	9	11	14	35	52	−20	Relegation to the Promozione
16.	Castellucchio	34	34	8	10	16	31	43	−12	Relegation to the Promozione
17.	Scanzorosciate	33	34	8	9	17	28	44	−16	Relegation to the Promozione
18.	Casale Vidolasco	10	34	2	4	28	19	89	−70	Relegation to the Promozione

==== Play-off ====
Semi-final

	Risultati
Aurora Seriate	4–1	Sarnico
Castegnato	1–2	Castiglione

Final

	Result
Aurora Seriate	0–1	Castiglione

==== Play-out ====
	Results
Castellucchio	1–2	Chiari
Volta	0–1	Valcalepio
Chiari	1–1	Castellucchio
Valcalepio	4–1	Volta

=== Trophy of Regional Campionato Lombardia ===
	Results
Rudianese	0–1	Saronno
Seregno	1–2	Rudianese
Saronno	0–0	Seregno

==== Classification ====
	Teams	Pt	G	V	N	P	GF	GS	GD	Result
1.	Saronno	4	2	1	1	0	1	0	+1	Champion
2.	Rudianese	3	2	1	0	1	2	2	+0	
3.	Seregno	1	2	0	1	1	1	2	−1	
