= ASD Sanluri Calcio =

Italian football club

Sanluri Calcio
- Full name: Associazione Sportiva Dilettantistica Sanluri Calcio
- Founded: 2003
- Dissolved: 2015
- Ground: Campu Nou, Sanluri, Italy
- Capacity: 1016
Home colours	Away colours

Associazione Sportiva Dilettantistica Sanluri Calcio or simply Sanluri Calcio was an Italian association football club, based in Sanluri, Sardinia.

== History ==
The club was founded in 2003. After several years in the regional championships, in the 2008–09 season, they won Eccellenza Sardinia and so were promoted to Serie D for the first time. In its first Serie D season, in 2009–10, the company finished in a positive fourth position on the table. Sanluri Calcio has been relegated in the 2010–11 season to Eccellenza Sardinia, after the playoff against Cynthia. The club, returned to the regional championships, was withdrawn in January 2015, when played in Eccellenza Sardinia, because of some controversial referee's decisions.

== Colours and badge ==
The team's colours were red and white.
