= ASD Bacoli Sibilla Flegrea =

Italian football club

Bacoli Sibilla
- Full name: Società Sportiva Dilettantistica Bacoli Sibilla Flegrea a r.l.
- Founded: 1925 (as Sibilla Bacoli); 2001 (refounded); 2007 (refounded)
- Ground: Stadio Tony Chiovato, Bacoli, Italy
- Capacity: 1,720
- Chairman: Stefania Filomena Borredon
- Manager: Alfonsino Somma
- League: Promozione Campania
Home colours	Away colours

ASD Bacoli Sibilla is an Italian association football club located in Bacoli, Campania. It currently plays in Promozione Campania.

== History ==
Founded in 1925 as Sibilla Bacoli the club started in Terza Divisione Campania (the fourth and last level of Italian football in the 1920s and 1930s) where it played against glorious clubs such as Avellino and Savoia (runner-up in the Italian top division in 1925).

In 2001 Sibilla Bacoli merged with El Brazil Napoli becoming Sibilla El Brazil Cuma.

=== Serie D ===
The club gained promotion to Serie D at the end of the 2004–05 Eccellenza season and changed its denomination to A.S.D. Bacoli Sibilla Flegrea. Since then, the club arrived for four times second and for one time third, missing out promotion to Lega Pro Seconda Divisione for four times.

At the end of 2010–11 Serie D season, the side gained access to the play-off for promotion in Lega Pro Seconda Divisione.

In the season 2011–12 it was relegated to Eccellenza.

== Colors and badge ==
Its colors are white and blue.
