= Polisportiva CS Pisticci =

Italian football club

P. CS Pisticci
- Full name: Polisportiva Club Sportivo Pisticci
- Founded: 1960
- Ground: Stadio Gaetano Michetti, Pisticci, Italy
- Capacity: 1,200
- Chairman: Donato Panetta
- Manager: Giuseppe Fortunato
- League: SERIE A
- 2010–11: Serie D/H, 15th (relegated)
Home colours	Away colours

Polisportiva Club Sportivo Pisticci is an Italian association football club, based in Pisticci, Basilicata.

The club was founded in 1960.

Pisticci in the season 2010–11, from Serie D group H relegated, in the play-out, to [Eccellenza Basilicata]. Now is a futsal team that milited in serie B.

The team's colors are yellow and blue.
