= AC Monteriggioni ASD =

Defunct Italian association football club

AC Monteriggioni
- Full name: Associazione Calcio Monteriggioni Associazi one Sportiva Dilettantistica
- Founded: 1969 (as A.S. Badesse)
- Dissolved: 2011
- Ground: Stadio Mauro Nannotti, Monteriggioni, Italy
- Capacity: 600
- 2010–11: Serie D/E, 18th (relegated)
Home colours	Away colours

Associazione Calcio Monteriggioni Associazione Sportiva Dilettantistica was an Italian association football club, based in Monteriggioni, Tuscany.

== History ==
The club was founded in 1969 as A.S. Badesse.

Monteriggioni in the season 2010–11, from Serie D group E was relegated to Eccellenza Tuscany.

=== The transfer to Colle Val d'Elsa ===
In summer 2011 the side, after the merger with Colle Giovane, transferred the seat and its sports title of Eccellenza to the city of Colle Val d'Elsa, becoming A.S.D. Olimpia Colligiana.

The football in the city is reborn, with a new club called A.C. Badesse, that is restarted from the Terza Categoria Siena.

== League and cup history ==
Season	A	Tier 2	Tier 3	Tier 4	D	E	Tier 7	Tier 8	Pts.	Pl.	W	L	T	GF	GA	GD
2010–11					18 (E)				29	34	7	19	8	33	53	−20

== Colors and badge ==
The team's colors were white and dark blue.
