= École de Football Saint-Christophe =

Italian football club

- Founded: 1971
- Ground: Municipal Stadium; Les Condémines; Saint-Christophe, Italy
Home colours	Away colours

École de Football Saint-Christophe (usually referred to as Saint-Christophe) is an Italian association football club, based in Saint-Christophe, Aosta Valley. Saint-Christophe plays in Seconda Categoria.

== History ==
=== Foundation ===
The club is the main football team of sports club Unione Polisportiva Saint-Christophe A.S.D. that was founded in 1971 as Saint-Christophe Calcio and includes also sections of athletic and tennis.

In summer 2010, the club, that had just been promoted for the first time from Eccellenza Piedmont and Aosta Valley to Serie D, changed its name to the current one, in memory of the former main team in the region, Valle d'Aosta Calcio, that just went bankrupt.

In the 2010–11 season the club gains access to the promotion play-off for Lega Pro Seconda Divisione, where it is beaten and eliminated by Rimini with the result of 3–1 in the last match of "Triangular 2" in the third round.

In the 2011–12 Serie D season, Vallée d'Aoste was promoted for the first time to Lega Pro Seconda Divisione. The club changed its name to the current one in order to represent the whole Aosta Valley.

The club was dissolved in 2016 and newly founded in 2023 as École de Football Saint-Christophe, starting from Terza Categoria.

== Colors and badge ==
The team's colors are white and claret.
