= SSD Calcio San Donà =

Italian football club

San Donà
- Full name: Società Sportiva Dilettantistica Calcio San Donà
- Nickname: Biancocelesti
- Founded: 1922; 104 years ago as, Sport Club Ardita; 1945; 81 years ago as, Associazione Calcio San Donà (refounded); 2001; 25 years ago as, Associazione Calcio Sandonà 1922 (refounded); 2010; 16 years ago as, SanDonàJesolo Calcio (merged); 2013; 13 years ago as, Città di San Donà di Piave (refounded); 2015; 11 years ago as, Società Sportiva Dilettantistica Calcio San Donà
- Ground: Stadio Verino Zanutto, San Donà di Piave, Italy
- Capacity: 4,200
- Chairman: Massimiliano Striuli
- Manager: Vincenzo Siciliano
- League: Serie D
- 2018–19: Serie D/C, 17th (relegated)
| Home colours | Away colours |

Società Sportiva Dilettantistica Calcio San Donà (usually referred to as simply San Donà) is an Italian association football club located in San Donà di Piave, Veneto. It currently plays in Serie D.

== History ==
=== A.C Sandonà 1922 ===
Old A.C. Sandonà logo

The club was founded on 1922 as S.C. Ardita and changed its name to A.C. San Donà in 1945 and A.C. Sandonà 1922 in 2001.

==== Serie C ====
San Donà played in Serie C2 from 1994–95 to 1998–99, when it was promoted to Serie C1. After this spell, the club was relegated back to Serie C2 and, at the end of the 2000–01 season, to Serie D.

==== Sale of sports title ====
In the summer of 2001 San Donà sold its sport title to U.S. Città di Jesolo who played in Promozione at the time and was refounded as A.C. Sandonà 1922, taking the place Jesolo in Promozione.

In the 2001–02 season the club won Promozione Veneto group D and was promoted to Eccellenza Veneto.

==== From 2006–07 to 2009–10 ====
Sandonà were promoted to Serie D following the 2006–07 season. Playing in division B of Eccellenza Veneto, Sandonà finished tied in the first place with AsoloFonte, with 57 points. On 6 May 2007 the tie-breaker game was won 2–1 by Sandonà, been promoted directly to Serie D.

After only one season, the club was relegated back to Eccellenza, but it was readmitted to Serie D to fill vacancies.

It was relegated again in 2009 and at the end of the 2009–10 season even to Promozione. At the end of the season it does not join 2010–11 championship.

=== SandonàJesoloCalcio ===
==== Reacquisition of sports title ====
In the summer 2010 A.C. Sandonà 1922 regained the sport title of U.S. Città di Jesolo sold on 2001, changing name in SandonàJesoloCalcio, in order to play Serie D in the 2010–11 Serie D season.

==== Serie D 2010–11 ====
The side finished the season at the 4th place in the group C of Serie D and, after beating Venezia 3–2, it gained access to the national play-off reaching the semifinals, where it was eliminated by Turris.

==== Serie D 2011–12 ====
In the 2011–12 season the club gained access to the final of Serie D promotion play-off with direct admission to the 4th round as finalist of Coppa Italia Serie D, but was beaten 3–2 by the winner Cosenza.

==== Liquidation ====
In summer 2013 the club was not able to enter 2013–14 Serie D and was so subsequently liquidated.

==== Città di San Donà di Piave ====
The team was refounded in the summer 2013 as "Associazione Sportiva Dilettantistica Città di San Donà di Piave" and it joined Terza Categoria, the ninth and last level of Italian football. In 2013–14 San Donà finished the season at the 5th place, then, in 2014–2015 the side arrived 1st and was promoted to Seconda Categoria 2015–16. Before the season it changed name to SSD Calcio San Donà. In 2015–2016 San Donà finished the season at the 8th place.

== Colors and badge ==
Its colors are white and sky blue. Second shirt is amaranth.
