= UC Montecchio Maggiore =

Italian football club

Montecchio Maggiore
- Full name: Unione Calcio Montecchio Maggiore S.r.l.
- Founded: 1923
- Ground: Stadio Gino Corsaro, Montecchio Maggiore, Italy
- Capacity: 1,000
- Chairman: Romano Aleardi
- Manager: Armando Farinello
- League: Eccellenza Veneto
- 2011–12: Serie D/C, 16th
Home colours	Away colours

Unione Calcio Montecchio Maggiore is an Italian association football club located in Montecchio Maggiore, Veneto. It currently plays in Eccellenza.

== History ==
Th eclub was founded in 1923.

At the end of the 2010–11 Serie D season, the club was relegated to Eccellenza after the play-off, but was later readmitted after a judgment of the High Court of Justice changed the result of the match Montebelluna-Este from 2–1 to 0–3.

In the season 2011–12 it was relegated to Eccellenza.

== Colors and badge ==
Its colors are white and red.
