= Real Rimini FC =

Italian football club

- Full name: Società Sportiva Dilettantistica Real Rimini Siti Football Club
- Founded: 2010
- Dissolved: 2012
- Ground: Stadio Romeo Neri
- Capacity: 9,768
- 2011–12: Serie D/F, 18th
Home colours	Away colours

Real Rimini Football Club was an Italian association football club located in Rimini, Emilia-Romagna.

== History ==
=== The sports title of Valleverde Riccione ===
The origins of the team go back to 1921 when the former Valleverde Riccione F.C. was founded in Riccione. In summer of 2010 its sports title of Serie D was moved to the city of Rimini to create Real Rimini F.C.. In the meanwhile, Valleverde Riccione FC was refounded as A.S.D. Riccione 1929.

=== Real Rimini ===
Real Rimini F.C. was relocated to take the place of Rimini Calcio F.C., an historical club of the city, that had financial problems. However, Rimini Calcio was later admitted to Serie D with the new denomination of A.C. Rimini 1912.

Real Rimini F.C. was fielded anyway, so the town of Rimini had two city derbies in the Serie D 2010–11: in this season it ranks ninth. Real Rimini lost both the matches with the results of 0–2 and 0-3 respectively. In the season 2011–12 it was relegated to Eccellenza. The club was dissolved in November 2012 by retiring, for financial problems at the beginning of the next season of Eccellenza.

Starting in 2024, with the relocation of Real Riccione to Rimini, there was another team bearing the name Real Rimini, which, however, was in no way connected to the other Real Rimini that had been active between 2010 and 2012.

== Colors and badge ==
Its colours were white and red.
