= History of Società Sportiva Nola =

History of the Italian football team history of Società Sportiva Nola

The history of Società Sportiva Nola has covered 71 years of the football from the club based in Nola, Campania. It was a professional Italian football club, founded in 1925 as Unione Sportiva Nola and being refounded in 1990 with its last denomination. Nola declared bankrupt in 1996.

The colors of the historic S.S. Nola was white and black.

== The former clubs in Nola ==
=== From the foundation of U.S. Nola to S.S. Nola ===
==== U.S. Nola ====
U.S. Nola was founded in 1925.

The first championship in which Nola took part was the Terza Divisione 1925–26, then won by Puteolana. After this championship, Nola decided to join the ULIC Serie A league. Nola won its division of the southern league and the qualification match against Caserta Campania to qualify to the finals against Palermo. Nola won 6-1 and advanced to the central-south final against Virtus Roma, champion of Central Italy: the winner would face the Northern Italy champion for the national title. Nola won the game on field 2–0, but the sports court reverted the result because of the improper position of one of its players, Spiltzer.

After an appearance in the 1928–29 Prima Divisione season, Nola has always played in the amateur level, until its promotion to Serie C2 in 1984–85. After several years of good results in the fourth tier, Nola was promoted to Serie C1 after the 1989–90 season.

==== S.S. Nola ====
In 1990 Nola changed its name to S.S. Nola and participated in Serie C1 seasons 1990–91 (13th), 1991–92 (10th), 1992–93 (14th), 1993–94 (16th, relegated and then rescued ), 1994–95 (6th) and 1995–96 (16th and relegated). Nola declared bankrupt in 1996.

=== From Virtus Nola 1925 to Comprensorio Nola ===
Nola was refounded in 1996 as Virtus Nola 1925 after the acquisition of the sports title of "Castelsangiorgio" in Eccellenza. In 1997 the club was renamed Sanità Nola after the acquisition of the sports title of "Sanità Napoli" in Serie D, but the team was relegated to Eccellenza Campania.

In summer 1998 Sanità Nola was renamed Comprensorio Nola. In the 2000–01 season the club won the Coppa Italia Dilettanti, obtaining direct promotion to Serie D, beating lombard team U.S. Caratese in the final 2–1, after having won the Regional Coppa Italia Campania.

In 2002 it transferred its sports title of Serie D to S.S. Juve Stabia.

==== Honours of Comprensorio Nola ====
- Coppa Italia Dilettanti
  - Champion (1): 2000–01
- Regional Coppa Italia Campania:
  - Winner (1): 2000–01

=== From Boys Nola to Atletico Vesuvio ===
Boys Nola 2004 was founded in summer 2004 and won the league of Seconda Categoria in 2004–05 and Prima Categoria in 2005–06, gaining promotion to Promozione ranking 3rd in 2006–07 season. Thanks to the merger with Atletico, the club took part directly to 2007-08 Eccellenza Campania with the new name of A.S.D. Atletico Nola.

It has played in Eccellenza Campania from 2007–08 to 2009–10. The club won its division at the end of the 2009–10 Eccellenza and was thus promoted to Serie D, the highest amateur league in Italy. At the end of the 2010–11 Serie D season, the club relegated back to Eccellenza. Since the season 2011-12 it plays in Eccellenza Campania in San Giorgio a Cremano. In the summer 2012 the club was renamed A.S.D. Atletico Vesuvio thus ceasing every bond of the city of Nola.

=== Nuvla San Felice ===
In summer 2011 Nuvla San Felice was born after the merger of G.S. Capriatese (founded in 1968 with the colors red and white) that has transferred the seat from Capriati a Volturno and its sports title of Serie D to the city of Nola and the football academy San Feliciano of San Felice a Cancello.

The club was initially named G.S.D. Nola Città dei Gigli, but later changed its denomination to the current one. The club then asked and obtained the move from Capriati a Volturno to San Felice a Cancello, but it was the main team of Nola in the season 2011–12 in Serie D/I ranking 6th.

In summer 2012 its sports title of Serie D was transferred to Gladiator and so it was dissolved.

=== Real S.M. Hyria Nola ===
In the 2012–13 season the main football club of Nola has been Real S.M. Hyria Nola, thanks to President Rosario Gaglione, who has transferred here the former Turris from the city of Torre del Greco.

In summer 2013 Gaglione has given the team sport title to F.C. Real Città di Vico Equense coming so excluded from Italian football.

=== Supporters ===
During the 80s and the 90s (with Nola Calcio was at its prime) there were three main support groups: Ultras Nola (born in the 80s), Indians Nola (1994) and Nasty Boys (1995). After Nola's bankruptcy, the organized supporter groups gradually fell into decline, to rise again after nearly a decade, with new groups created when the club reached Eccellenza.

The Nolan supporters are friends with the Juve Stabia, Savoia, Salerno, Sora and Rutigliano, while they have rivalries with the fans of Avellino, Casertana, Turris, Ebolitana and Stasia.

== The main club in Nola ==
After having sold its title to Juve Stabia, F.C. Sporting Nola were founded to take Comprensorio Nola's place.

=== Sporting Nola ===
A.S.D. Sporting Nola was founded in summer 2002 by Nolan football fans, as F.C. Sporting Nola.

The team currently plays in Promozione Campania in the 2013–14 season after an ascent started in Terza Categoria Campania in the 2002–03 season.
