= AC Somma =

Italian football club

Somma
- Full name: Associazione Calcio Somma
- Founded: 1960 (as A.C. Sommacampagna)
- Dissolved: 2014 (became A.S.D. Montorio, after the merger with A.S.D. Montorio Calcio)
- Ground: Stadio Comunale, Sommacampagna, Italy
- Capacity: ~ 500
Home colours	Away colours

Associazione Calcio Somma was an Italian association football club located in Sommacampagna, Veneto. The best achievement of the team was the triumph in the 1977–78 edition of the Coppa Italia Dilettanti. It lasted played in 2013–14 Promozione season. The jersey colours were white and blue.

== Honours ==
=== Domestic competitions ===
- Coppa Italia Dilettanti:
  - Champions (1): 1977–78
