= Gladiator 1924 =

- Full name: Associazione Sportiva Dilettantistica Gladiator 1924
- Nicknames: Nerazzurri, Audaci, Gladiatori
- Founded: 1924
- Ground: Stadio Mario Piccirillo, Santa Maria Capua Vetere, Italy
- Capacity: 2,000
- Chairman: Giacomo De Felice
- Manager: Marco Mignano
- Coach: Francesco Farina
- League: Serie D
- 2025–26: Eccellenza Campania Girone A, 3rd
Home colours	Away colours

Associazione Sportiva Dilettantistica Gladiator 1924 or simply Gladiator is an Italian association football club, based in Santa Maria Capua Vetere, Campania. The club currently plays in Serie D.

== History ==
=== Foundation ===
The club was founded in 1924 as Polisportiva Gladiator. The club gets its name from the gladiatorial school that was based in the city in ancient times. Spartacus' revolt started there.

On March 7 1924, Sporting Club Gladiator was founded, which in 1930, after merging with Sammaritana, changed its name to U.S. Gladiator. In those years, the team played in the Third, Second, and First Divisions, managing to be invited to Serie C in 1945-1946. Gladiator won first place in their group, but the club was unable to register for the following season due to a lack of funding and had to start again in the lower leagues.

=== 1950s ===
In the 1950s, Gladiator played steadily in Promozione. Presidents alternated between Giusti, Cangiano, Raucci, Palombi, and Papa, and it was under the latter's presidency, a close friend of his, that Italo Allodi arrived in Santa Maria Capua Vetere. He played for the Nerazzurri as a midfielder in the 1952-1953 and 1953-1954 seasons, alongside Stelio Nardin and Mistone, both of whom later joined Napoli.

=== 1960s and 1970s ===
In the 1967-1968 season, it merged with Juve Sammaritana, led by President Amedeo Di Lorenzo, who were then playing in the Promozione league. After the merger, the team recovered from the crisis and returned to Serie D at the end of the 1972-1973 season.

=== 1980s and 1990s ===
In the 1980s, with the arrival of the Vollero brothers, Gladiator played for several years in Serie C2 (1984-1985 and 1985-1986 seasons). In the following years, after the departure of the Vollero brothers, Gladiator returned to the Eccellenza league. Their presidents were first the businessman Palombi and then the surveyor Gaetano Signore. The latter managed to lead the team back to Serie D in the 1989-1990 football season.

=== 2000s ===
The club was taken over in the late 1990s by president Alfonso Salzillo, who, together with lawyer Mario Natale, managed to bring the team back to Serie D and subsequently, with the technical guidance of Nello Di Costanzo, to Serie C2 thanks to the victory of the 2001-2002 championship.

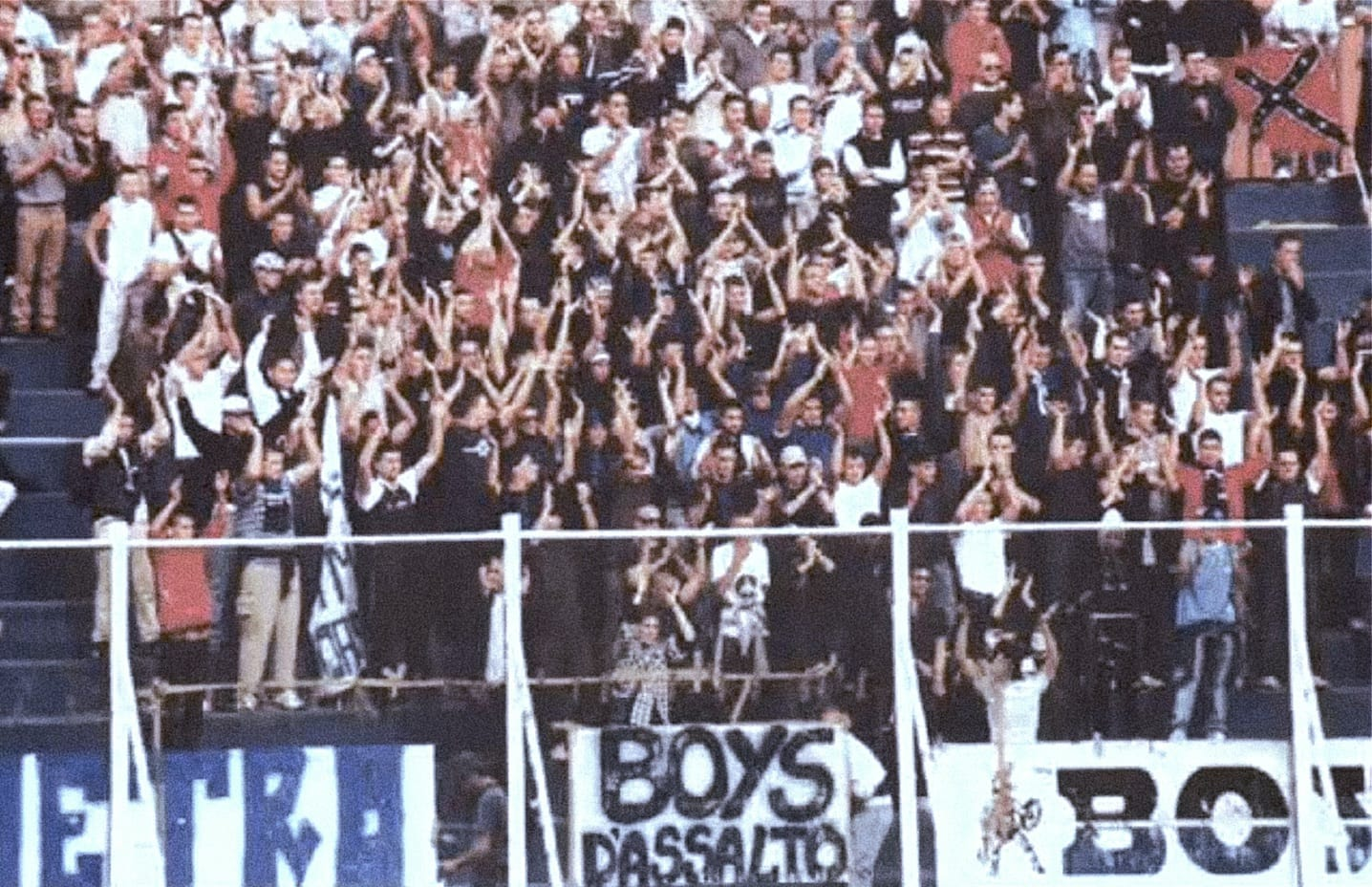
Gladiator ultras at an away match

The club has played 4 seasons, from 1984–85 to 1985–86 and from 2001–02 to 2002–03, in Serie C2.

=== 2012: S.F. Gladiator ===
In summer 2012 after the acquisition of the sports title of Serie D club Nuvla San Felice, based in Nola, the club was renamed A.S.D. San Felice Gladiator.

=== A.S.D. Gladiator 1924 ===
In the summer of 2014, coinciding with the change of headquarters from San Felice a Cancello to Maddaloni, the official name was changed to Associazione Sportiva Dilettantistica Gladiator 1924.In the 2014-2015 and 2015-2016 seasons, Gladiator participated in the Eccellenza championship, in Group A. Only in the summer of 2016 did good news finally arrive for the club: thanks to an agreement between Dr. Giacomo De Felice and the D'Anna family of Marcianise, Serie D returned to Santa Maria Capua Vetere.

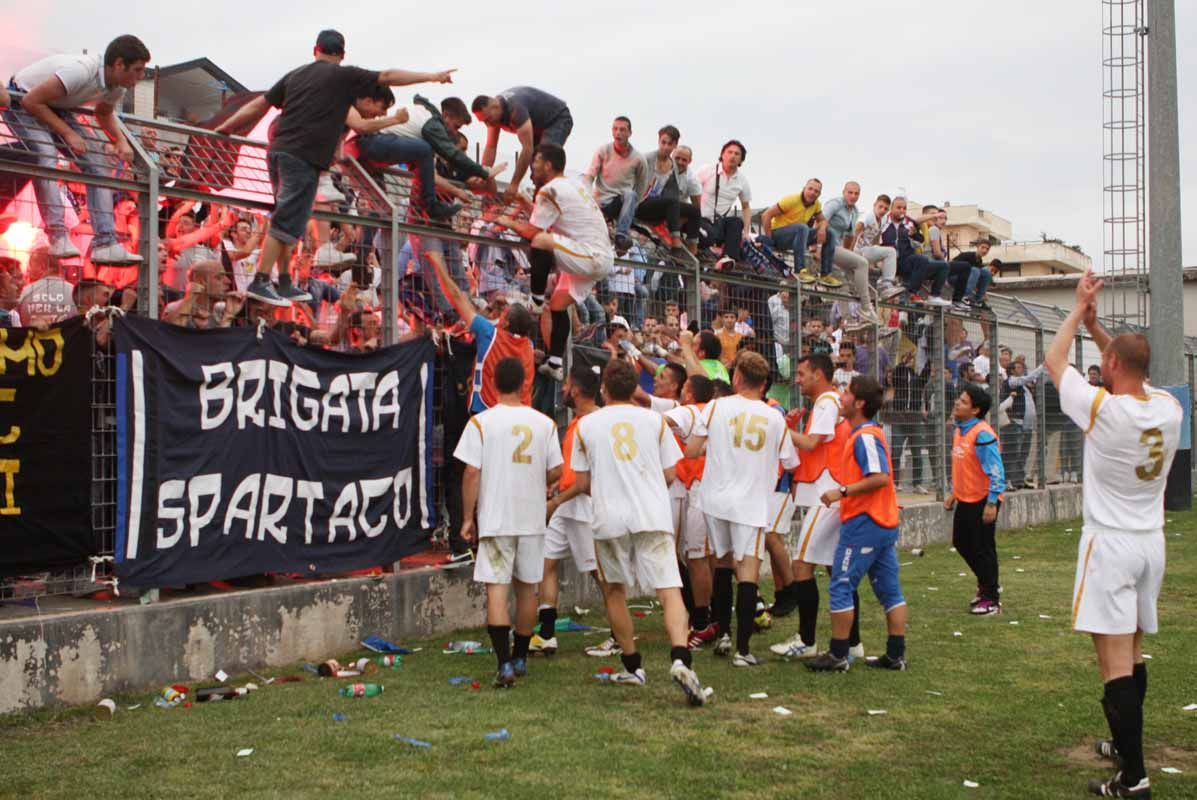
Gladiator-Carano Eccellenza play off

The adventure in the Serie D championship lasted one season, with the club finishing the first half of the season just five points behind first place. In the second half of the season they finished the season in ninth place, achieving a comfortable safety. However, in the summer, the club was unable to register for the Serie D championship, due to a mere €31,000 in guarantee not paid by then-president Salvatore D'Anna, and was forced to restart from the Promozione championship.

In the 2018-2019 season, they participated in the Eccellenza championship - Group A, under the leadership of Aveta, finishing in fourth place. Against all odds, they won the regional playoffs, beating both Afragolese and Frattese away. In the national playoff semifinal, bad luck would have that Canicattì would advance to the final. The Nerazzurri prepared the paperwork for return in Serie D which will become official on the 31/07/19. In the 2022-2023 Serie D season, Gladiator secured survival in Group H.

=== 2020s ===
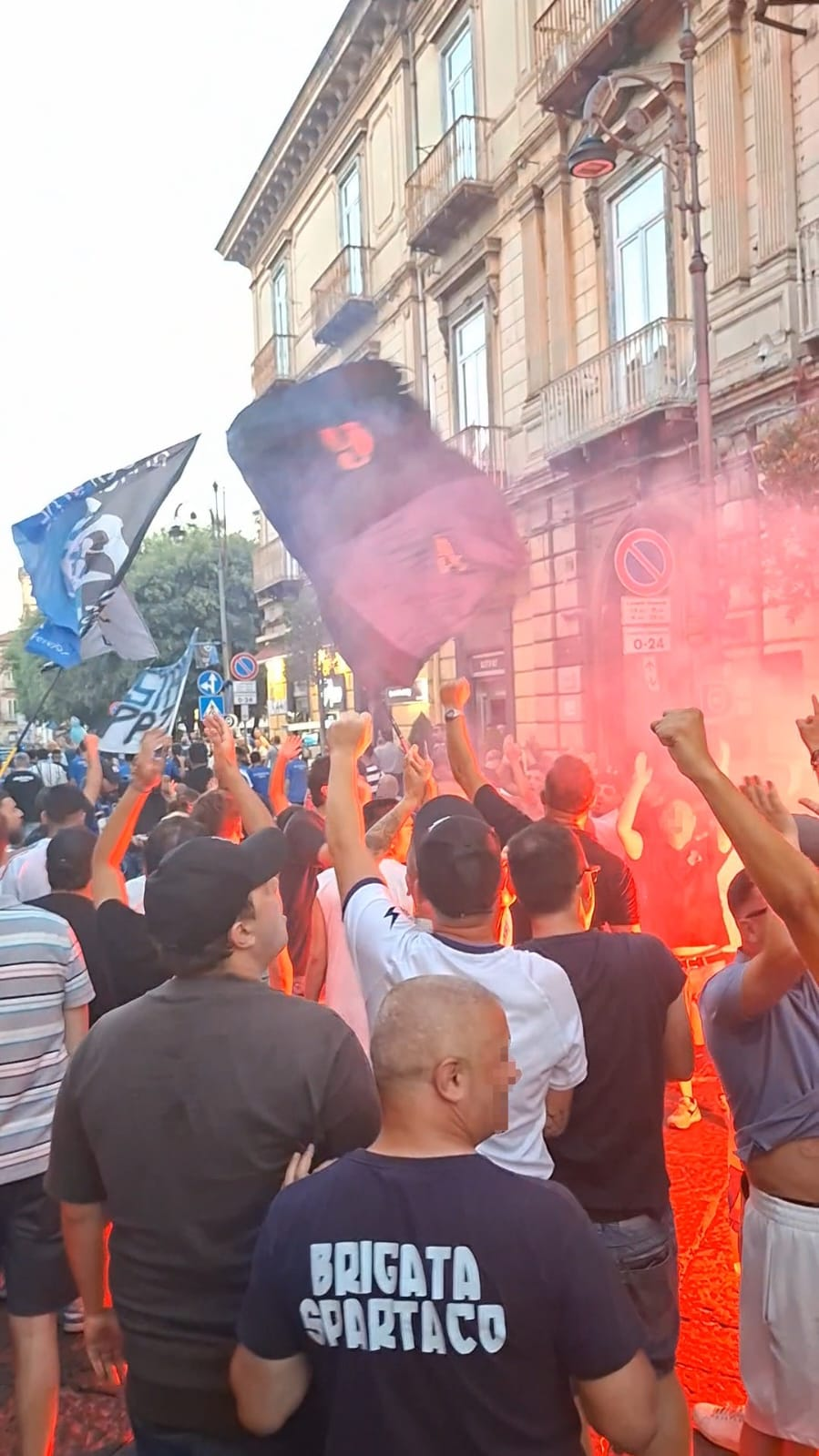
Gladiator supporters after victory in the 2026 Eccellenza Playoff

In the 2023-2024 season, Gladiator was relegated to Eccellenza after losing the play-out against Anzio. After finishing third in the 2025-2026 Eccellenza Campania championship, they competed in the postseason, defeating Boys Caivanese in the regional final. In the inter-regional play-offs, the Nerazzurri defeated Matese FC in the first round and Taranto in the final, a match that marked their return to Serie D after two seasons.

== Colours and badge ==
The team's colours are black and blue. Its symbol is the gladiator.

== Supporters ==
The main ultra groups are Brigata Spartaco and Black and Blue inside. The most intense rivalry is with Casertana FC, officially started in the 2001 Serie D season, it has its roots in local pride against the provincial capital. Other rivalries include Ischia Calcio, Puteolana and Acerrana.

== Honours ==
- Serie C 1945-46
- Serie D: 1983–84, 2000–01
- Eccellenza 2000-01, 2025-26 (playoff)
