= AS Giorgianna =

Italian football club

Giorgianna
- Full name: A.S. Giorgianna
- Founded: 1990
- Dissolved: 1999
- 1998–99: Eccellenza Girone B, 5th

A.S. Giorgianna was an Italian association football club located in San Giorgio in Bosco, Veneto.

== History ==
The team was founded in 1990 as Giorgianna, after the merger between San Giorgio in Bosco and Sant'Anna Morosina. In the 1996–1997 season, played in Serie D. At the end of the 1998–99 Eccellenza season, the team was dissolved. In the 1999–2000 season, a new team, Calcio San Giorgio In Bosco, was founded.

== Colors and badge ==
Its colors are red and green.
