= ASD Villafranca =

Italian football club

Villafranca
- Full name: Associazione Sportiva Dilettantistica Villafranca
- Nickname(s): Cappe Falzo Hasa Dal
- Founded: 1920
- Ground: Stadio Comunale, Villafranca di Verona, Italy
- Chairman: Mirko Cordioli
- Manager: Paolo Corghi
- League: Eccellenza
- 2019–20: Serie D/B, 20th (relegated)
Home colours	Away colours

Associazione Sportiva Dilettantistica Villafranca is an Italian association football club, based in Villafranca di Verona, Veneto. It currently plays in Serie D.

== History ==
=== The foundation ===
The club was founded in 1920.

=== Serie D ===
At the end of the 2010–11 Serie D season, Villafranca was relegated to Eccellenza after the play-out, but on 5 August 2011 it was readmitted to fill vacancies.

In the season 2011–12 it was again relegated to Eccellenza.

== Colors and badge ==
The team's colors are white and dark blue.
