= ASD Union Quinto =

Italian football club

Union Quinto
- Full name: Associazione Sportiva Dilettantistica Union Quinto
- Founded: 1937; 88 years ago
- Ground: Stadio Omobono Tenni, Quinto di Treviso, Italy
- Chairman: Silvano Favarato
- Manager: Silvano Favarato
- League: Eccellenza Veneto
- 2013–13: Serie D/C, 20th
| Home colours | Away colours |

Associazione Sportiva Dilettantistica Union Quinto is an Italian association football club located in Quinto di Treviso, Veneto. It plays in Eccellenza Veneto.

== History ==
The club was founded in 1937.

== Colors and badge ==
Its colors are red and blue.
