= Gaeta Calcio 1931 =

Italian football club

Gaeta
- Full name: Gaeta Calcio 1931
- Founded: 1931 (as Aquilotti)
- Ground: Stadio Communale "Antonio Riciniello", Gaeta, Italy
- Capacity: 2,055
- Chairman: Pasquale Iezzi
- Manager: Antonello Di Gregorio
- League: Eccellenza Lazio
- 2011–12: Serie D/H, 18th
Home colours	Away colours

Gaeta Calcio 1931 is an Italian association football club located in Gaeta, Lazio. It currently plays in Eccellenza.

== History ==
The club was founded in 1931 as Associazione Calcio Aquilotti and was subsequently renamed Polisportiva Gaeta, before taking the current name.

In the season 2011–12 it was relegated to Eccellenza.

== Colors and badge ==
The team's color are white and red.
