= USC Colognese =

Italian football club

Colognese
- Full name: Unione Sportiva Calcio Colognese
- Nickname(s): –
- Founded: 1961
- Ground: Stadio Giacinto Facchetti, Cologno al Serio, Italy
- Chairman: Giacomo Cavalleri
- League: Eccellenza Lombardy
- 2011–12: Serie D/B, 17th
Home colours	Away colours

Unione Sportiva Calcio Colognese is an Italian association football club located in Cologno al Serio, Lombardy. It currently plays in Eccellenza.

== History ==
The club was founded in 1961.

In the season 2011–12 it was relegated to Eccellenza.

== Colors and badge ==
Its colors are yellow and green.

== Honours ==
- Coppa Italia Dilettanti
  - Winners: 2004–05
