= Coppa Italia Dilettanti =

Cup for teams of 5th and 6th levels of Italian football

- Founded: 1966
- Region: Italy
- Teams: 19 (final phase)
- Current champions: Rovato Vertovese (1st title)
- Most championships: Casarano (2 titles)
- Website: Official webpage

The Coppa Italia Dilettanti (Italian for: Italian Amateurs Cup) is an annual knock-out competition for teams from the fifth and lower levels of Italian football: the Eccellenza and some clubs from the Promozione. All ties except for the final are played on a home-and-away basis. The cup-winners are also awarded promotion to Serie D, the fourth-ranked league.

Prior to the 1999–2000 season the competition also included teams from Serie D. There were then two parallel knockout competitions, one for Serie D teams and one for teams from the Eccellenza and Promozione, with the winners of each sub-tournament meeting in the final. Subsequently, Serie D have staged their own competition, the Coppa Italia Serie D, leaving only Eccellenza and Promozione teams to compete for the Coppa Italia Dilettanti.

== Winners ==
- 1966–67 – Impruneta
- 1967–68 – STEFER (Rome)
- 1968–69 – ALMAS (Rome)
- 1969–70 – Ponte San Pietro
- 1970–71 – Montebelluna
- 1971–72 – Valdinievole
- 1972–73 – Jesolo
- 1973–74 – Miranese
- 1974–75 – Banco (Rome)
- 1975–76 – Soresinese
- 1976–77 – Casteggio
- 1977–78 – Sommacampagna
- 1978–79 – Ravanusa
- 1979–80 – Cittadella
- 1980–81 – Internapoli
- 1981–82 – Leffe
- 1982–83 – Lodigiani
- 1983–84 – Montevarchi
- 1984–85 – Rosignano
- 1985–86 – Policassino
- 1986–87 – Avezzano
- 1987–88 – Altamura
- 1988–89 – Sestese
- 1989–90 – Breno
- 1990–91 – Savona
- 1991–92 – Quinzano
- 1992–93 – Treviso
- 1993–94 – Varese
- 1994–95 – Iperzola
- 1995–96 – Alcamo
- 1996–97 – Astrea
- 1997–98 – Larcianese
- 1998–99 – Casale
- 1999–2000 – Orlandina
- 2000–01 – Comprensorio Nola
- 2001–02 – Boys Caivanese
- 2002–03 – Ladispoli
- 2003–04 – Salò
- 2004–05 – Colognese
- 2005–06 – Esperia Viareggio
- 2006–07 – Pontevecchio
- 2007–08 – HinterReggio
- 2008–09 – Virtus Casarano
- 2009–10 – Tuttocuoio
- 2010–11 – Ancona 1905
- 2011–12 – Bisceglie
- 2012–13 – Fermana
- 2013–14 – Campobasso
- 2014–15 – Virtus Francavilla
- 2015–16 – Sanremese
- 2016–17 – Villabiagio
- 2017–18 – Sankt Georgen
- 2018–19 – Casarano
- 2019–20 Not awarded
- 2020–21 Not awarded
- 2021–22 – Barletta
- 2022–23 – Cast Brescia
- 2023–24 – Paternò
- 2024–25 – Rovato Vertovese
- 2025–26 – Bisceglie

== See also ==
- Football in Italy
- Eccellenza
- Promozione
- Coppa Italia Serie D
