= AS Real Cesenatico =

Italian football club

Real Cesenatico
- Full name: Associazione Sportiva; Real Cesenatico
- Founded: 1932; 1953 (refounded)
- Ground: Stadio Alfiero Moretti; Cesenatico, Italy
- Capacity: 9,500
- Chairman: Gaudenzio Bagnolini
- Manager: Vilmer Ferri
- League: Eccellenza Emilia–Romagna
- 2010–11: Serie D/F, 17th (relegated)
Home colours	Away colours

Associazione Sportiva Real Cesenatico (formerly Associazione Sportiva Dilettantistica Cesenatico Chimicart) is an Italian association football club located in Cesenatico, Emilia-Romagna.

It, in the season 2010–11, from Serie D group F relegated to Eccellenza Emilia-Romagna.

Its colors are red and blue.

In 2000, the sports title was transferred from A.C. Cesenatico S.r.l. to Cesenatico Calcio A.S..
