= US Opitergina =

Italian football club

- Full name: Unione Sportiva Opitergina
- Nickname(s): U.S.O.
- Founded: 1946
- Ground: Stadio Polisportivo Opitergium; Oderzo, Italy
- Capacity: 5,000
- Chairman: Renato Bernardi
- Manager: Vacant
- League: Promozione Veneto/D
- 2016–17: Promozione Veneto/D, 6th
Home colours	Away colours

Unione Sportiva Opitergina is an Italian association football club, based in Oderzo, Veneto. The club was founded in 1946 after the close of Second World War.

Opitergina in the season 2010–11, from Serie D group C relegated, in the play-out, to Eccellenza Veneto, where it plays in the current season.

The team's colors are white and red.
