= SSD Castel San Pietro Terme Calcio =

Italian football club

S.S.D. Castel San Pietro Terme Calcio
- Full name: Società Sportiva Dilettantistica Castel San Pietro Terme Calcio SRL
- Founded: 1932
- Dissolved: 2012
- Ground: Stadio Comunale, Castel San Pietro Terme, Italy
- Capacity: 2,800
- 2011–12: Eccellenza Emilia–Romagna B, 16th
Home colours	Away colours

S.S.D. Castel San Pietro Terme Calcio was an Italian association football club, based in Castel San Pietro Terme.

In the season 2010–11 it was relegated from Serie D group D to Eccellenza Emilia–Romagna. The next season it finished 16th in group B and beat Faenza Calcio in the relegation playout, but was excluded from future editions of Eccellenza and subsequently folded.

== History ==
The club was founded on 10 September 1934, unofficially playing on the pitches between Viale Terme, the Sillaro stream, the Chiusa and the spas.

On 19 September 1934 the F.I.G.C. Emiliano ratified the inscription of Castel. From here begins the official activity, with the team participating in the Regional First Division (Prima Divisione) Championship.

At that time the federal championships were divided as follows: Serie A, Serie B, Serie C, 1st regional division and 2nd regional division.

A few years later, however, the competitive activity was suspended due to the tragedy of the Second World War, and that Castel San Pietro Terme being directly on the front line.

The stadium suffered serious damage, which only after ten years of life lost its roofing from heavy bombing.

In 1946 the sporting activity resumed with difficulty thanks to many local volunteers, such as club presidents Erus Poggi and Luigi Canè, the secretary Francesco (Checco) Lasi, the shopkeeper Martelli, the coach, a then very young Francesco Rizzoli and many others.

The team that participated in the 1st Division Championship from 1946 onwards was founded by all Castellane with very few exceptions. A few of which went on to play in the higher national leagues.

The club name was changed to Unione Sportiva Castel San Pietro at the beginning of the 1950s, however activity was limited due to lack of means.

A few years later the competitive activity resumed under the presidency of Gildo Cavina and with Franco Broccoli as club secretary. The latter stayed in office for many years to come, the soul of all the Castellana football activity.

Castel San Pietro played 2005/2006 in Serie C2/B, ending second-last placed, and then was relegated after playoffs.

== Colours and badge ==
The team's colours were yellow and red.
