= ACD Città di Concordia =

Italian football club

Julia Sagittaria
- Full name: Associazione Calcio Dilettantistica Città di Concordia
- Founded: 1952
- Ground: Stadio Comunale, Concordia Sagittaria, Italy
- Capacity: 600
- Chairman: Luigi Carnieletto
- League: Promozione
- 2020–21: Promozione Veneto/D, 6th
Home colours	Away colours

Associazione Calcio Dilettantistica Città di Concordia (formerly A.C.D. Sagittaria Julia) is an Italian association football club located in Concordia Sagittaria, Veneto. It currently plays in Promozione.

== History ==
It was founded in 1952.

In the season 2011–12 it was relegated to Eccellenza after four seasons in Serie D.

== Colors and badge ==
The team's color are black and blue.
