= Anzio Calcio 1924 =

Italian football club

Anzio
- Full name: Anzio Calcio 1924
- Founded: 1924; 102 years ago as, AS Anzio; 1990; 36 years ago as, Anziolavinio; 2015; 11 years ago as, Anzio Calcio 1924
- Ground: Stadio Comunale Riccardo Caporuscio, Pontinia, Italy
- Capacity: 340
- Chairman: Antonella Mastrella; Franco Rizzaro (honorary president)
- Manager: Masahudu Alhassan
- League: Serie D
- 2025–26: Serie D/G, 14th (qualified for relegation play-off)

Anzio Calcio 1924 is an Italian association football club located in Anzio, Lazio, and founded a century ago.
