= GC Castelnuovo D/G =

Italian football club

- Full name: Gruppo Calcio Castelnuovo Del Garda
- Founded: 1965; 61 years ago 2005 (refounded)
- Ground: Stadio Giuseppe Pancera
- Manager: Maicol Tinelli
- Coach: Alessandro Vecchioni
- League: Promozione Veneto
- 2024–25: Promozione Veneto, Group A, 1th of 16 (promoted)
- Website: castelnuovocalcio.com
Home colours	Away colours

Gruppo Calcio Castelnuovo Del Garda, commonly known as GC Castelnuovo D/G or Castelnuovo (pronounced [kaˌstɛlˈnwɔːvo]), is an Italian football club based in Castelnuovo del Garda, Veneto, who compete in Promozione, the sixth tier of the Italian football league system.

Founded in 1965 and re-established in 2005 as CastelnuovoSandrà through a merger with another team based in Castelnuovo del Garda, the club reached Serie D for the first time in 2011, but was relegated back to Eccellenza shortly thereafter, falling down again into the lower tiers of Italian football.

== Honours ==
- Prima Categoria
  - Champions (1): 2017–18 (Group A)
- Promozione
  - Champions (2): 2021–22 (Group A), 2024–25 (Group A)
