= List of Serie D champions and promotions =

Serie D was established in 1948. Only in 32 of its 70 editions, however, provided for a final phase to award a national category title: this took place between 1952 and 1957 with the Scudetto IV Serie, in the year 1957–58 with the title of Lega Interregionale, from 1992 to 1999 with the Scudetto Dilettanti, and since 1999 with the current Serie D. The record of victories of the category championship is held by Siena, winning twice in 1955–56 and 2014–15.

== Serie D Champions ==
=== Scudetto IV Serie ===
- 1952–53: Catanzaro
- 1953–54: Bari
- 1954–55: Colleferro
- 1955–56: Siena
- 1956–57: Sarom Ravenna

=== Campionato Interregionale ===
- 1957–58: Cosenza, Ozo Mantova & Spezia (ex-aequo)
- 1959–60 to 1961–62: Title awarded to the winning groups of Prima Categoria
- 1962–63 to 1991–92: Title not awarded

=== Scudetto Dilettanti ===
- 1992–93: Eurobuilding Crevalcore
- 1993–94: Pro Vercelli
- 1994–95: Taranto
- 1995–96: Castel San Pietro (Note: Successively not admitted to Serie C2.)
- 1996–97: Biellese
- 1997–98: Giugliano
- 1998–99: Lanciano

=== Serie D ===
- 1999–2000: Sangiovannese
- 2000–01: Palmese
- 2001–02: Olbia
- 2002–03: Cavese
- 2003–04: Massese
- 2004–05: Bassano Virtus
- 2005–06: Paganese
- 2006–07: Tempio
- 2007–08: Aversa Normanna
- 2008–09: Pro Vasto
- 2009–10: Montichiari
- 2010–11: Cuneo
- 2011–12: Venezia
- 2012–13: Ischia
- 2013–14: Pordenone
- 2014–15: Robur Siena
- 2015–16: Viterbese
- 2016–17: Monza
- 2017–18: Pro Patria
- 2018–19: Avellino
- 2019–20: Not awarded
- 2020–21: Not awarded
- 2021–22: Recanatese
- 2022–23: Sestri Levante
- 2023–24: Campobasso
- 2024–25: Livorno
- 2025–26: Scafatese

== Dilettanti Champions ==
=== Promozione Interregionale (Sud Italia) ===
- 1948–49 – Pomigliano Calcio
- 1949–50 – Antonio Toma Maglie
- 1950–51 – Molfetta Sportiva

=== Scudetto Dilettanti (Prima Categoria) ===
- 1957–58 – Civitavecchiese
- 1958–59 – Mobilieri Cascina
- 1959–60 – ASD Ponziana
- 1960–61 – ASDC Borgomanero
- 1961–62 – ASD Nocerina 1910

=== Trofeo Jacinto (Interregionale) ===
- 1987–88 – ASD Vigor Trani Calcio
- 1988–89 – FC Valdagno
- 1989–90 – Enna Calcio SCSD
- 1990–91 – FC Matera
- 1991–92 – ASD OltrepòVoghera

== Promotions ==
The list includes the wild cards.

- 1952–53: Carrarese, Lecco, Catanzaro, Carbosarda
- 1953–54: Cremonese, Bolzano, Bari, Prato
- 1954–55: Vigevano, Mestrina, BPD Colleferro, Molfetta
- 1955–56: Biellese, Reggiana, Siena, Reggina
- 1956–57: Pro Vercelli, SAROM Ravenna, Chinotto Neri Roma
- 1957–58: 21 teams (Note: Due to enlargement of Serie C.)
- 1958–59: Savona, Bolzano, Vis Sauro Pesaro, Pistoiese, Sassari Torres, Maceratese, Crotone
- 1959–60: Entella Chiavari, Saronno, Cesena, Viareggio, Bisceglie, San Vito Benevento
- 1960–61: Empoli, Ivrea, Vittorio Veneto, Grosseto, Portacivitanoves, Potenza
- 1961–62: Rapallo Ruentes, Rizzoli Milano, C.R.D.A. Monfalcone, Solvay Rosignano, Trani, Avellino
- 1962–63: Carrarese, Solbiatese, Vis Sauro Pesaro, Empoli, Maceratese, Casertana
- 1963–64: Entella Chiavari, Piacenza, Carpi, Ternana, Avellino, Crotone
- 1964–65: Jesi, Massese, Nardò, Rapallo Ruentes, Savoia Torre Annunziata, Trevigliese
- 1965–66: Barletta, Frosinone, Massiminiana Catania, Verbania, Spezia, Vis Sauro Pesaro
- 1966–67: Bolzano, Chieti, Città di Castello, Internapoli, Pavia, Pontedera
- 1967–68: Macobi Asti, Cremonese, Sottomarina, Forlì, Viareggio, Olbia, Matera, Brindisi, Marsala
- 1968–69: Derthona, Seregno, Rovereto, Imola, Lucchese, Latina, Sorrento, Pro Vasto, Acquapozzillo
- 1969–70: Imperia, Parma, Trento, Maceratese, Aquila Montevarchi, Viterbese, Savoia Torre Annunziata, Martina Franca, Enna
- 1970–71: Pro Vercelli, Cremonese, Belluno, Giulianova, Sangiovannese, Frosinone, Turris, Trani, Siracusa
- 1971–72: Cossatese, Vigevano, Triestina, Ravenna, Aquila Montevarchi, Torres Sassari, Juventus Stabia, Barletta, Trapani
- 1972–73: Gaviese, Bolzano, Clodiasottomarina, Riccione, Grosseto, Latina, Nocerina, Pescara, Marsala
- 1973–74: Juniorcasale, Sant'Angelo Lodigiano, Mestrina, Carpi, Sangiovannese, Cynthia Genzano, Benevento, Teramo, Messina
- 1974–75: Albese, Pro Patria, Treviso, Anconitana, Pistoiese, Olbia, Potenza, Campobasso, Cosenza
- 1975–76: Biellese, Pergocrema, Triestina, Fano Alma Juventus, Siena, Viterbese, Paganese, Matera, Alcamo
- 1976–77: Omegna, Trento, Audace San Michele, Forlì, Prato, Latina, Chieti, Pro Cavese, Ragusa
- 1977–78: Imperia, Savona, Derthona, Albese, Pavia, Legnano, Fanfulla, Vigevano, Monselice, Mestrina, Conegliano, Adriese, Carpi, Vis Pesaro, Civitanovese, Osimana, Carrarese, Montecatini, Montevarchi, Sangiovannese, Almas Roma, LVPA Frascati, Avezzano, Cral Banco di Roma, Formia Club, Casertana, Rende, Palmese, Gallipoli, Lanciano, Potenza, Monopoli, Vittoria, Nuova Igea, Vigor Lamezia, Alcamo, Sanremese, Rhodense, Anconitana, Cerretese, Viareggio, Frosinone, Civitavecchia, Savoia, Cassino, Francavilla, Cosenza, Messina
- 1978–79: Arona, Aurora Desio, Pordenone, Venezia, Città di Castello, Sansepolcro, Pietrasanta, Rondinella Marzocco, Squinzano, L'Aquila, Juventus Stabia, Terranova Gela
- 1979–80: Torretta Santa Caterina, Omegna, Casatese, Mira, Maceratese, Cattolica, Sant'Elena Quartu, Casalotti, Virtus Casarano, Martina Franca, Frattese, Campania
- 1980–81: Imperia, Vogherese, Virescit Boccaleone, Montebelluna, Vigor Senigallia, Jesi, Torres, Frosinone, Ercolanese, Casoria, Akragas, Modica
- 1981–82: Asti T.S.C., Ospitaletto, Pro Gorizia, Ravenna, Pontedera, Elpidiense, Foligno, Grumese, Gioiese, Gioventù Brindisi, Licata, Carbonia
- 1982–83: Biellese, Brembillese, Venezia, Centese, Massese, Cesenatico, Lodigiani Roma, Ischia Isolaverde, Afragolese, Pro Italia Galatina, Uva Italia Canicattì, Olbia
- 1983–84: Pro Vercelli, Virescit Boccaleone, Euromobil Pievigina, Sassuolo, Montevarchi, Fermana, Aesernia, Gladiator, Crotone, Fidelis Andria, Nissa, Nuorese
- 1984–85: Cairese, Leffe, Orceana, Giorgione, Entella Bacezza, Ravenna, Pro Cisterna, Angizia, Nola, Juventus Stabia, Trapani, Sorso
- 1985–86: Casale, Oltrepò, Paluani Chievo, Moa Suzzara, Cuoiopelli, Vis Pesaro, Latina, Lanciano, Rifo Sud, Bisceglie, Giarre, Olbia
- 1986–87: Saviglianese, Pro Sesto, Intim Helen, Riccione, Sarzanese 1906, Gubbio, Olimpia Celano, Chieti, Vigor Lamezia, Kroton, Atletico Catania, Tempio
- 1987–88: Juventus Domo, Oltrepò, Orceana, San Marino, Cecina, Poggibonsi, Cynthia, Trani, Battipagliese, Fasano, Juventina Gela, Ilvamarisardegna, Carpi, Potenza
- 1988–89: Cuneo '80, Solbiatese, Valdagno, Cittadella, Baracca Lugo, Mobilieri Ponsacco, C.E.P., Ostiamare, La Palma, Altamura, Adelaide Nicastro, Acireale
- 1989–90: Finlocat Fiorenzuola, Saronno, Leffe, Euromobil Pievigina, Viareggio, Vastese, Astrea, Formia, Sangiuseppese, Savoia, Enna, Lecco, Molfetta
- 1990–91: Pistoiese, Aosta, Cerveteri, Avezzano, Juve Stabia, Matera
- 1991–92: Giorgione, Oltrepò, Gualdo, Sora, Akragas (as Agrigento Hinterland)
- 1992–93: Legnano, Cittadella, Vogherese, Eurobuilding Crevalcore, Nuova Maceratese, Sassari Torres, Fasano, Trapani, Battipagliese, Lumezzane, Livorno, Forlì, L'Aquila
- 1993–94: Pro Vercelli, Varese, Brescello, Sandonà, Vis Pesaro, Teramo, Giulianova, Benevento, Castrovillari
- 1994–95: Grosseto, Gallaratese, Alzano Virescit, Treviso, Viterbese, Tolentino, Marsala, Taranto, Catania
- 1995–96: Pisa, Vogherese, Iperzola, Mestre, Arezzo, Maceratese, Caserta, Altamura, Juveterranova Gela
- 1996–97: Viareggio, Biellese, Albinese, Mantova, Castel San Pietro, Astrea, Cavese, Tricase, Crotone
- 1997–98: Sanremese, Borgosesia, Trento, Faenza, Gubbio, L'Aquila, Giugliano, Nardò, Messina Peloro, Sassuolo
- 1998–99: Imperia, Meda, Montichiari, Imolese, Rondinella Impruneta, Castelnuovo, Lanciano, Fasano, Sant'Anastasia
- 1999–2000: Moncalieri, Legnano, Südtirol-Alto Adige, Russi, Sangiovannese, San Marino, Puteolana, Campobasso, Igea Virtus, Taranto
- 2000–01: Valenzana, Pavia, Thiene, Poggese, Poggibonsi, Sambenedettese, Palmese, Martina, Paternò, Trento, Frosinone
- 2001–02: Savona, Olbia, Pordenone, Aglianese, Fano, Tivoli, Gladiator, Brindisi, Ragusa, Forlì, Grosseto, Latina
- 2002–03: Pizzighettone, Ivrea, Bellunopontalpi, Ravenna, Cappiano Romaiano, Rosetana, Isernia, Melfi, Cavese, Palazzolo, Bellaria Igea Marina, Sansovino, Tolentino, Rutigliano, Vittoria
- 2003–04: Massese, Casale, Carpenedolo, Portosummaga, Castel San Pietro, Morro d'Oro, Juve Stabia, Manfredonia, Rende, Sanremese, Calcio Potenza, Pro Vasto, Vigor Lamezia
- 2004–05: Cuneo, Bassano Virtus, Città di Jesolo, Città di Lecco, Pergocrema, Rieti, Foligno, Real Marcianise, Gallipoli, Modica
- 2005–06: Varese, Nuorese, Boca San Lazzaro, Rovigo, Poggibonsi, Val di Sangro, Cassino, Paganese, Sorrento, Vibonese, Monopoli, Celano
- 2006–07: Canavese, U.S.O. Calcio, Mezzocorona, Rodengo Saiano, Esperia Viareggio, Valle del Giovenco, Scafatese, Noicattaro, Neapolis
- 2007–08: Alessandria, Como, Itala San Marco, Giacomense, Figline, Sangiustese, Isola Liri, San Felice Normanna, Fortitudo Cosenza, Alghero, Colligiana, Montichiari, Sambonifacese, Barletta
- 2008–09: Spezia, P.B. Vercelli, Sacilese, Crociati Noceto, FeralpiSalò, Sporting Lucchese, Pro Vasto, Fano, Villacidrese, Brindisi, Siracusa, Nocerina, Vico Equense
- 2009–10: Savona, Tritium, Montichiari, Pisa, Gavorrano, Chieti, Fondi, Neapolis Mugnano, Milazzo, Virtus Entella, Casale, Renate, Carpi, L'Aquila, Pomezia, Matera, Trapani, Vigor Lamezia, Avellino
- 2010–11: Cuneo, Mantova, Treviso, Borgo a Buggiano, Perugia, Santarcangelo, Aprilia, Arzanese, Ebolitana, Rimini
- 2011–12: V.d.A. Saint-Christophe, Sterilgarda Castiglione, Venezia, Forlì, Pontedera, Teramo, Salerno, Martina Franca, HinterReggio
- 2012–13: Bra, Pergolettese, Delta Porto Tolle, Tuttocuoio, Castel Rigone, Torres, Ischia, Messina, Virtus Verona, Real Vicenza, Casertana, Foggia, Cosenza, SPAL (after merger)
- 2013–14: Giana Erminio, Pro Piacenza, Pordenone, Lucchese, Pistoiese, Ancona, Lupa Roma, Matera, Savoia, Arezzo
- 2014–15: Cuneo, Padova, Rimini, Robur Siena, Maceratese, Lupa Castelli Romani, Fidelis Andria, Monopoli, Akragas
- 2015–16: Piacenza, Venezia, Parma, Gubbio, Sambenedettese, Viterbese, Virtus Francavilla, Siracusa, Fano, Fondi, Forlì, Olbia, Reggina, Taranto, Vibonese
- 2016–17: Cuneo, Monza, Mestre, Ravenna, Gavorrano, Fermana, Arzachena, Bisceglie, Sicula Leonzio, Triestina, Rende
- 2017–18: Gozzano, Pro Patria, Virtus Verona, Rimini, Albissola, Vis Pesaro, Rieti, Potenza, Vibonese, Imolese, Pro Cavese
- 2018–19: Lecco, Como, ArzignanoChiampo, Pianese, Cesena, Picerno, Bari, Avellino, Pergolettese
- 2019–20: Lucchese, Pro Sesto, Campodarsego, Mantova, Grosseto, Matelica, Turris, Bitonto, Palermo
- 2020–21: Seregno, Trento, Fiorenzuola, Montevarchi, Campobasso, Monterosi, Taranto, ACR Messina
- 2021–22: Novara F.C., Sangiuliano, Arzignano Valchiampo, Rimini, San Donato Tavarnelle, Recanatese, Giugliano, Audace Cerignola, Gelbison
- 2022–23: Sestri Levante, Lumezzane, Legnago, Giana Erminio, Arezzo, Pineto, Sorrento, Brindisi, Catania, Casertana
- 2023–24: Alcione Milano, Union Clodiense Chioggia, Caldiero Terme, Carpi, Pianese, Campobasso, Cavese, Team Altamura, Trapani
- 2024–25: Bra, Ospitaletto, Dolomiti Bellunesi, Forlì, Livorno, Sambenedettese, Guidonia Montecelio, Casarano, Siracusa, Ravenna
- 2025–26: Vado, Folgore Caratese, Treviso, Desenzano, Grosseto, Ostia Mare, Scafatese, Barletta, Savoia
