= 2009–10 Serie D =

Serie D
- Season: 2009–10

The 2009–10 Serie D was the sixty-second edition of the top level Italian non-professional football championship. It represented the fifth tier in the Italian football league system. It consisted of 167 divided into six 18-team divisions, one 19-team division and two 20-team divisions.

The regular Serie D season started September 6, 2009. Each team played two matches against every other team in its own division; a total of 34 matches for 18-team divisions, 36 matches for the 19-team divisions, and 38 matches for the 20-team division. The nine division winners were automatically promoted to Lega Pro Seconda Divisione for the 2009–10 season, while the two last-placed teams are automatically relegated to Eccellenza.

After the regular season is complete, teams placed 6th-last through to 3rd-last in each division play a double-leg series (6th-last vs 3rd-last, 5th-last vs 4th-last) where the winners remain in Serie D the following season and the two losers are also relegated to Eccellenza for a total of 4 relegations in each division, 36 in total for the league. There are no playoffs if the difference between two teams is bigger than eight points.

The nine division winners enter a tournament to determine the over-all Serie D champion and is awarded the Scudetto Dilettanti.

Teams placed second through fifth in each division enter a playoff tournament after the regular season as well. Eventually, a final game determines which team finishes first and which teams comes in second in this 36-team playoff, and these teams may be bumped up to Lega Pro Seconda Divisione if one or more current Seconda Divisione teams runs into financial difficulties or is penalized.

== Events ==
=== Start of season ===
Given a normal season where there are no team failures and special promotions, Serie D would feature 9 teams that had been relegated from Lega Pro Seconda Divisione, 36 teams that had been promoted from Eccellenza, and 117 teams had played in Serie D the year before. Due to nine bankruptcies and non-admissions in the professional leagues above Serie D and eight bankruptcies or promotions to fill vacancies in Serie D, the 2009–10 season was to feature only 5 teams that played in Serie C2 2008-09, 40 teams that played in 2008–09 Eccellenza, and 121 teams that played in 2008–09 Serie D. The league also admitted three of the teams that had failed in the senior leagues. Pisa & Avellino, both of whom played in 2008–09 Serie B, were placed in Girone D & Girone I respectively. Venezia which played in Serie C1 2008-09 was placed in Girone C.The league admitted on team more from Eccellenza L'Aquila, which was first in its Girone two games before the end and couldn't play them because of the earthquake, and was placed in Girone F. Finally, 167 teams will compete in Serie D 2009-10.

=== Promotions ===
The nine division winners are automatically promoted to Lega Pro Seconda Divisione 2010–11.

On April 11, 2010 Tritium became the first team to get promoted from Serie D in the season, winning the Girone B in advance of five weeks after a 2–1 win at Darfo Boario.

It was followed one week later by Savona won Girone A in Week 30 after a 1–1 draw at Acqui with four games to go, Montichiari won Girone C in Week 34 after a 3–1 win at home to Montebelluna with four games to go and Pisa won Girone D in Week 34 after a 1–0 win at home to Pontedera with four games to go on April 18.

One week later Neapolis Mugnano won Girone H and in Week 35 after a 1–0 win at home to Matera with three games to go on April 24.

In Week 33, on May 9 Gavorrano despite a 3–0 loss to Calenzano by the authorities winning Girone E and Fondi after a 2–2 draw at home to Boville Ernica winning Girone G.

On the final day of the season in Week 34 Chieti after a 2–1 win at Real Montecchio on May 16 winning Girone F and Milazzo after a 3–2 win at Mazara on May 16 winning Girone I.

== Standings ==
=== Girone A ===
Teams from Aosta Valley, Piedmont, Liguria, & Lombardy

Pos	Team	Pld	W	D	L	GF	GA	GD	Pts	Promotion or relegation
1	Savona (C, P)	34	27	4	3	64	23	+41	85	Promotion to Lega Pro Seconda Divisione
2	Virtus Entella (P)	34	19	10	5	55	20	+35	67	Promotion to Lega Pro Seconda Divisione (Note: Virtus Entella and Casale promoted to the Lega Pro Seconda Divisione to fill the vacancies created.)
3	Casale (P)	34	19	10	5	53	29	+24	67	Promotion to Lega Pro Seconda Divisione
4	Albese	34	15	11	8	51	36	+15	56	Qualification for Promotion play-off
5	Sarzanese	34	13	15	6	41	26	+15	54	Qualification for Promotion play-off
6	Acqui	34	11	16	7	38	34	+4	49	
7	Lavagnese	34	12	12	10	47	34	+13	48	
8	Borgorosso Arenzano	34	13	6	15	55	56	−1	45	
9	Settimo	34	11	12	11	42	49	−7	45	
10	Aquanera	34	12	8	14	49	61	−12	44	
11	Cuneo	34	9	15	10	37	35	+2	42	
12	Chieri	34	8	15	11	47	50	−3	39	
13	Vigevano	34	10	9	15	36	49	−13	39	
14	Rivoli	34	9	10	15	44	59	−15	36 (Note: Rivoli and Valle d'Aosta were docked 1 point.)	Qualification for Relegation play-off
15	Pro Settimo (R)	34	7	12	15	36	56	−20	33	Relegation to Eccellenza
16	Derthona	34	6	10	18	34	54	−20	28	Relegation to Eccellenza (Note: Derthona reprieved from relegation to fill the vacancies created from 2009-10 Serie D.)
17	Sestrese (R)	34	6	9	19	27	59	−32	27	Relegation to Eccellenza
18	Valle d'Aosta (R)	34	3	8	23	28	74	−46	16	Relegation to Eccellenza

Updated to match(es) played on May 16, 2010. Source:
Rules for classification: 1) points; 2) goal difference; 3) number of goals scored.
(C) Champions; (P) Promoted; (R) Relegated

=== Girone B ===
Teams from Piedmont, Lombardy & Emilia-Romagna

Pos	Team	Pld	W	D	L	GF	GA	GD	Pts	Promotion or relegation
1	Tritium (C, P)	34	24	8	2	68	24	+44	80	Promotion to Lega Pro Seconda Divisione
2	AlzanoCene	34	13	16	5	53	41	+12	55	Qualification for Promotion play-off
3	Pontisola	34	15	9	10	53	42	+11	54	Qualification for Promotion play-off
4	Darfo Boario	34	14	12	8	42	36	+6	54	Qualification for Promotion play-off
5	Renate (P)	34	15	9	10	47	41	+6	54	Promotion to Lega Pro Seconda Divisione (Note: Renate promoted to the Lega Pro Seconda Divisione to fill the vacancies created.)
6	Colognese	34	13	12	9	47	38	+9	51	
7	Insubria	34	14	8	12	53	49	+4	50	
8	Voghera	34	12	12	10	63	50	+13	48	
9	Cantù San Paolo	34	13	9	12	48	50	−2	48	
10	Pizzighettone	34	12	9	13	50	49	+1	45	
11	Olginatese	34	11	9	14	52	59	−7	42	
12	Solbiatese	34	9	15	10	42	44	−2	42	
13	US Sestese (R)	34	10	11	13	34	43	−9	41	Relegation to Eccellenza
14	Fiorenzuola	34	8	13	13	44	49	−5	37	Relegation to Eccellenza (Note: Fiorenzuola reprieved from relegation to fill the vacancies created from 2009–10 Serie D.)
15	Caratese	34	8	12	14	26	36	−10	36	Qualification for Relegation play-off
16	Borgosesia	34	8	9	17	30	49	−19	33	Qualification for Relegation play-off
17	Caravaggio (R)	34	7	8	19	40	60	−20	29	Relegation to Eccellenza
18	Oltrepò (R)	34	3	13	18	22	54	−32	21 (Note: Oltrepò had deducted 1 point.)	Relegation to Eccellenza

Updated to match(es) played on May 16, 2010. Source:
Rules for classification: 1) points; 2) goal difference; 3) number of goals scored.
(C) Champions; (P) Promoted; (R) Relegated

=== Girone C ===
Teams from Lombardy, Trentino-Alto Adige/Südtirol, Veneto & Friuli-Venezia Giulia

Pos	Team	Pld	W	D	L	GF	GA	GD	Pts	Promotion or relegation
1	Montichiari (C, P)	38	25	9	4	64	23	+41	84	Promotion to Lega Pro Seconda Divisione (Note: Montichiari won the Scudetto Dilettanti 2009-10.)
2	Este	38	21	13	4	69	41	+28	76	Qualification for Promotion play-off
3	Venezia	38	21	12	5	71	43	+28	75	Qualification for Promotion play-off
4	Jesolo	38	21	7	10	88	57	+31	70 (Note: Jesolo moved to San Donà di Piave, giving to the local club A.C. Sandonà 1922, from now renamed SandonàJesoloCalcio, its sport title. It plays in 2010-11 Serie D.)	Dissolved for transfer to the sport title to San Donà di Piave
5	Union Quinto	38	17	13	8	63	41	+22	64	Qualification for Promotion play-off
6	Montebelluna	38	15	15	8	57	41	+16	60	
7	Pordenone	38	14	18	6	58	43	+15	60	
8	Tamai	38	14	15	9	50	41	+9	57	
9	Virtus Verona	38	14	12	12	60	53	+7	54	
10	Villafranca	38	13	12	13	53	51	+2	51	
11	Sanvitese	38	13	10	15	57	59	−2	49	
12	Albignasego	38	11	14	13	53	48	+5	47	
13	Belluno	38	12	10	16	49	59	−10	46	
14	Nuova Verolese	38	12	10	16	40	63	−23	46	
15	Domegliara (R)	38	9	17	12	48	54	−6	44	Relegation to Eccellenza (Note: Domegliara declared bankrupt and relegated to the Eccellenza or lower.)
16	Concordia	38	10	14	14	41	56	−15	44	
17	Palazzolo (R)	38	6	11	21	44	73	−29	29	Relegation to Eccellenza
18	Manzanese (R)	38	5	9	24	29	55	−26	24	Relegation to Eccellenza
19	Porfido Albiano (R)	38	4	11	23	37	84	−47	23	Relegation to Eccellenza
20	Montecchio Maggiore	38	3	8	27	33	77	−44	17	Relegation to Eccellenza (Note: Montecchio Maggiore reprieved from relegation to fill the vacancies created from 2009-10 Serie D.)

Updated to match(es) played on May 16, 2010. Source:
Rules for classification: 1) points; 2) goal difference; 3) number of goals scored.
(C) Champions; (P) Promoted; (R) Relegated

=== Girone D ===
Teams from Lombardy, Veneto, Emilia-Romagna, Tuscany & Marche

Pos	Team	Pld	W	D	L	GF	GA	GD	Pts	Promotion or relegation
1	Pisa (C, P)	38	24	10	4	66	24	+42	82	Promotion to Lega Pro Prima Divisione (Note: Pisa promoted to the Lega Pro Prima Divisione to fill the vacancies created.)
2	Carpi (P)	38	18	11	9	59	35	+24	65	Promotion to Lega Pro Seconda Divisione (Note: Carpi promoted to the Lega Pro Seconda Divisione to fill the vacancies created.)
3	Fossombrone	38	18	11	9	49	32	+17	65	Qualification for Promotion play-off
4	Chioggia Sottomarina	38	16	13	9	63	40	+23	61	Qualification for Promotion play-off
5	Santarcangelo	38	16	13	9	48	38	+10	61	Qualification for Promotion play-off
6	Rosignano	38	14	17	7	45	36	+9	59	
7	Russi	38	13	18	7	53	38	+15	57	
8	Virtus Castelfranco	38	15	11	12	43	38	+5	56	
9	Rovigo	38	14	13	11	51	44	+7	55	
10	Borgo a Buggiano	38	11	17	10	41	42	−1	50	
11	Mezzolara	38	11	13	14	35	41	−6	46	
12	Pontedera	38	11	12	15	43	44	−1	45	
13	Castellana	38	10	15	13	42	49	−7	45	
14	Mobilieri Ponsacco	38	10	15	13	39	48	−9	45	
15	Cecina (R)	38	10	15	13	30	40	−10	45 (Note: Cecina declared bankrupt and relegated to Eccellenza or lower.)	Relegation to Eccellenza
16	Valleverde Riccione (Note: Valleverde Riccione moved to Rimini and so changed its name to Real Rimini F.C., but the new A.S.D. Riccione 1929, club of Eccellenza Emilia–Romagna, is the legitimate heir of the former team.) (R)	38	10	12	16	45	53	−8	42	Relegation to Eccellenza
17	Castel San Pietro	38	6	18	14	34	50	−16	36	Relegation to Eccellenza (Note: Castel San Pietro reprieved from relegation to fill the vacancies created from 2009–10 Serie D.)
18	Adriese (R)	38	7	13	18	34	64	−30	34	Relegation to Eccellenza
19	Boca Pietri (R)	38	6	11	21	38	66	−28	29	Relegation to Eccellenza
20	Castellarano (R)	38	4	12	22	36	71	−35	24	Relegation to Eccellenza

Updated to match(es) played on May 16, 2010. Source:
Rules for classification: 1) points; 2) goal difference; 3) number of goals scored.
(C) Champions; (P) Promoted; (R) Relegated

=== Girone E ===
Teams from Tuscany, Umbria & Lazio

Pos	Team	Pld	W	D	L	GF	GA	GD	Pts	Promotion or relegation
1	Gavorrano (C, P)	34	19	5	10	56	38	+18	62	Promotion to Lega Pro Seconda Divisione
2	Guidonia	34	17	6	11	61	43	+18	57	Qualification for Promotion play-off
3	Castel Rigone	34	15	10	9	54	33	+21	55	Qualification for Promotion play-off
4	Group Castello	34	16	7	11	51	35	+16	55	Qualification for Promotion play-off
5	Monterotondo	34	15	9	10	54	38	+16	54	Qualification for Promotion play-off
6	Deruta	34	15	6	13	41	33	+8	51	
7	Sansepolcro	34	13	12	9	42	38	+4	51	
8	AS Sestese	34	13	7	14	40	50	−10	46	
9	Forcoli	34	12	8	14	36	37	−1	44	
10	Scandicci	34	10	14	10	37	43	−6	44	
11	Montevarchi	34	11	10	13	34	33	+1	42 (Note: Montevarchi had 1 point deducted.)	
12	Fortis Juventus	34	11	9	14	34	45	−11	42	
13	Orvietana	34	10	11	13	34	43	−9	41	Qualification for Relegation play-off
14	Pontevecchio	34	11	8	15	42	47	−5	41	Qualification for Relegation play-off
15	Monteriggioni	34	10	10	14	32	46	−14	40	Relegation to Eccellenza (Note: Monteriggioni and Sporting Terni reprieved from relegation to fill the vacancies created from 2009–10 Serie D.)
16	Sporting Terni	34	10	10	14	42	57	−15	40	Relegation to Eccellenza
17	Calenzano (R)	34	10	8	16	27	38	−11	38	Relegation to Eccellenza
18	Sangimignano (R)	34	7	12	15	27	47	−20	33	Relegation to Eccellenza

Updated to match(es) played on May 16, 2010. Source:
Rules for classification: 1) points; 2) goal difference; 3) number of goals scored.
(C) Champions; (P) Promoted; (R) Relegated

=== Girone F ===
Teams from Marche, Abruzzo & Molise

Pos	Team	Pld	W	D	L	GF	GA	GD	Pts	Promotion or relegation
1	Chieti (C, P)	34	20	7	7	54	31	+23	67	Promotion to Lega Pro Seconda Divisione
2	Santegidiese	34	18	9	7	62	38	+24	63	Qualification for Promotion play-off
3	Val di Sangro	34	18	9	7	61	41	+20	63	Qualification for Promotion play-off
4	L'Aquila (P)	34	18	7	9	52	28	+24	61	Promotion to Lega Pro Seconda Divisione (Note: L'Aquila and Campobasso promoted to the Lega Pro Seconda Divisione to fill the vacancies created.)
5	Civitanovese	34	15	13	6	42	30	+12	58	Qualification for Promotion play-off
6	Atletico Trivento	34	15	13	6	42	20	+22	57 (Note: Atletico Trivento had 1 point deducted.)	
7	Recanatese	34	12	16	6	33	19	+14	51	
8	Olympia Agnonese	34	12	14	8	52	46	+6	50	
9	Casoli (R)	34	11	11	12	41	42	−1	44	Relegation to Eccellenza (Note: Casoli declared bankrupt and relegated to Eccellenza or lower.)
10	Campobasso (P)	34	11	10	13	35	29	+6	43	Promotion to Lega Pro Seconda Divisione
11	Miglianico	34	11	8	15	36	50	−14	41	
12	Bojano	34	11	10	13	33	42	−9	41 (Note: Bojano had 2 point deducted and saved after the victory for 5-4, on penalties, in tie-breaker with Angolana.)	
13	R.C. Angolana	34	11	8	15	41	50	−9	41 (Note: Angolana obliged to relegation playout, after defeat for 5-4, on penalties in tie-breaker with Bojano.)	Qualification for Relegation play-off
14	Luco Canistro	34	10	10	14	40	42	−2	40	Qualification for Relegation play-off
15	Morro d'Oro (R)	34	11	6	17	41	55	−14	39	Relegation to Eccellenza
16	Centobuchi (R)	34	10	7	17	33	51	−18	37	Relegation to Eccellenza
17	Elpidiense Cascinare (R)	34	2	9	23	10	45	−35	15	Relegation to Eccellenza
18	Real Montecchio (R)	34	1	11	22	11	29	−18	14	Relegation to Eccellenza

Updated to match(es) played on May 16, 2010. Source:
Rules for classification: 1) points; 2) goal difference; 3) number of goals scored.
(C) Champions; (P) Promoted; (R) Relegated

=== Girone G ===
Teams from Lazio & Sardinia

Pos	Team	Pld	W	D	L	GF	GA	GD	Pts	Promotion or relegation
1	Fondi (C, P)	34	18	10	6	59	28	+31	64	Promotion to Lega Pro Seconda Divisione
2	Gaeta	34	17	9	8	62	41	+21	60	Qualification for Promotion play-off (Note: Gaeta declared bankrupt and relegated to Eccellenza or lower. The club was later readmitted.)
3	Pomezia (P)	34	17	7	10	53	43	+10	58	Promotion to Lega Pro Seconda Divisione (Note: Pomezia and Latina promoted to the Lega Pro Seconda Divisione to fill the vacancies created.)
4	Sanluri	34	15	12	7	49	44	+5	57	Qualification for Promotion play-off
5	Selargius	34	16	8	10	57	45	+12	56	Qualification for Promotion play-off
6	Flaminia Civita Castellana	34	12	15	7	45	30	+15	51	
7	Rondinelle Latina	34	13	11	10	50	48	+2	50	
8	Viterbese	34	11	16	7	34	26	+8	49	
9	Latina (P)	34	11	13	10	42	44	−2	46	Promotion to Lega Pro Seconda Divisione
10	Budoni	34	11	11	12	51	48	+3	44	
11	Tavolara	34	10	11	13	40	41	−1	41	
12	Cynthia	34	11	7	16	39	47	−8	40	
13	Boville Ernica	34	8	15	11	40	46	−6	39	Qualification for Relegation play-off
14	Astrea	34	10	7	17	46	63	−17	37	Qualification for Relegation play-off
15	Castelsardo (R)	34	8	12	14	37	49	−12	36	Relegation to Eccellenza
16	Arzachena	34	9	7	18	36	53	−17	34	Relegation to Eccellenza (Note: Arzachena reprieved from relegation to fill the vacancies created from 2009–10 Serie D.)
17	Rieti (R)	34	8	9	17	53	75	−22	33	Relegation to Eccellenza
18	Morolo (R)	34	8	6	20	26	48	−22	30	Relegation to Eccellenza

Updated to match(es) played on May 16, 2010. Source:
Rules for classification: 1) points; 2) goal difference; 3) number of goals scored.
(C) Champions; (P) Promoted; (R) Relegated

=== Girone H ===
Teams from Campania, Apulia, & Basilicata

Pos	Team	Pld	W	D	L	GF	GA	GD	Pts	Promotion or relegation
1	Neapolis Mugnano (C, P)	36	24	7	5	71	32	+39	79	Promotion to Lega Pro Seconda Divisione
2	Pianura (R)	36	20	10	6	64	36	+28	70	Relegation to Eccellenza (Note: Pianura declared bankrupt and relegated to Eccellenza or lower.)
3	Virtus Casarano	36	19	12	5	62	31	+31	69	Qualification for Promotion play-off
4	Forza e Coraggio	36	18	9	9	63	48	+15	63	Qualification for Promotion play-off
5	Sant'Antonio Abate	36	17	9	10	58	43	+15	60	Qualification for Promotion play-off
6	Casertana	36	18	4	14	43	34	+9	58	
7	Francavilla	36	16	7	13	54	46	+8	55	
8	Pomigliano	36	15	10	11	43	41	+2	55	
9	Matera (O, P)	36	12	13	11	47	48	−1	49	Promotion to Lega Pro Seconda Divisione (Note: Matera won Coppa Italia Serie D 2010 and the Promotion Playoffs. Later gain promotion to fill the vacancies created in Lega Pro Seconda Divisione.)
10	Grottaglie	36	13	9	14	51	47	+4	48	
11	Turris	36	14	5	17	55	62	−7	47	
12	Ostuni	36	12	8	16	45	50	−5	44	
13	Angri	36	9	13	14	38	60	−22	40	
14	Bitonto (R)	36	8	13	15	37	51	−14	37	Relegation to Eccellenza (Note: Bitonto declared bankrupt, decide to restart in Terza Categoria (10th level of Italian football).)
15	Bacoli Sibilla	36	8	13	15	37	51	−14	37	Relegation to Eccellenza (Note: Bacoli Sibilla and ASD Francavilla reprieved from relegation to fill the vacancies created from 2009–10 Serie D.)
16	Ischia	36	9	9	18	30	48	−18	36	Qualification for Relegation play-off
17	Pisticci	36	9	8	19	30	50	−20	35	Qualification for Relegation play-off
18	ASD Francavilla	36	7	10	19	33	46	−13	31	Relegation to Eccellenza
19	Fasano (R)	36	4	11	21	25	57	−32	23	Relegation to Eccellenza

Updated to match(es) played on May 16, 2010. Source:
Rules for classification: 1) points; 2) goal difference; 3) number of goals scored.
(C) Champions; (O) Play-off winners; (P) Promoted; (R) Relegated

=== Girone I ===
Teams from Campania, Calabria, & Sicily

Pos	Team	Pld	W	D	L	GF	GA	GD	Pts	Promotion or relegation
1	Milazzo (C, P)	34	21	5	8	44	27	+17	68	Promotion to Lega Pro Seconda Divisione
2	Trapani (P)	34	21	4	9	59	29	+30	67	Promotion to Lega Pro Seconda Divisione (Note: Trapani, Vigor Lamezia and Avellino promoted to the Lega Pro Seconda Divisione to fill the vacancies created.)
3	Rosarno	34	18	10	6	41	22	+19	64	Qualification for Promotion play-off
4	Vigor Lamezia (P)	34	17	9	8	55	33	+22	60	Promotion to Lega Pro Seconda Divisione
5	Avellino (P)	34	17	8	9	56	35	+21	59 (Note: Avellino allowed to playoff after victory for 1–0 in tie-breaker with Rossanese)	Promotion to Lega Pro Seconda Divisione
6	Rossanese	34	16	11	7	22	17	+5	59 (Note: Rossanese not allowed to playoff after defeat for 1–0 in tie-breaker with Avellino)	
7	Sapri	34	14	8	12	44	39	+5	50	
8	Nissa	34	13	8	13	39	36	+3	47	
9	Modica	34	14	5	15	47	51	−4	47	
10	Sambiase	34	10	16	8	47	36	+11	46	
11	HinterReggio	34	10	12	12	45	50	−5	42	
12	Mazara	34	11	8	15	33	43	−10	41	
13	Messina	34	10	11	13	41	38	+3	41	
14	Palazzolo A.S.D. (R)	34	11	9	14	48	49	−1	40 (Note: A.C. Palazzolo had 2 point deducted.)	Relegation to Eccellenza
15	Viribus Unitis	34	7	12	15	34	52	−18	33	Qualification for Relegation play-off
16	Acicatena (R)	34	6	7	21	23	57	−34	25	Relegation to Eccellenza
17	Castrovillari (R)	34	5	10	19	34	61	−27	24 (Note: Castrovillari and Adrano 1 point deducted.)	Relegation to Eccellenza
18	Adrano (R)	34	5	7	22	27	72	−45	21	Relegation to Eccellenza

Updated to match(es) played on May 16, 2010. Source:
Rules for classification: 1) points; 2) goal difference; 3) number of goals scored.
(C) Champions; (P) Promoted; (R) Relegated

== Division winners ==
All teams promoted to 2010–11 Lega Pro Seconda Divisione except from Pisa which promoted to 2010–11 Lega Pro Prima Divisione

Division	Winners
A	Savona
B	Tritium
C	Montichiari
D	Pisa
E	Gavorrano
F	Chieti
G	Fondi
H	Neapolis Mugnano
I	Milazzo

== Scudetto Dilettanti ==
=== First round ===
- Division winners placed into 3 groups of 3
- Group winners and best second-placed team qualify for semi-finals

==== Group 1 ====
Pos	Team	Pld	W	D	L	GF	GA	GD	Pts
1	Savona (A)	2	1	1	0	4	1	+3	4
2	Montichiari (C)	2	0	2	0	0	0	0	2
3	Tritium (B)	2	0	1	1	1	4	−3	1

Tritium (B)	0–0	Montichiari (C)	played May 30, 2010
Savona (A)	4–1	Tritium (B)	played June 6, 2010
Montichiari (C)	0–0	Savona (A)	played June 13, 2010

==== Group 2 ====
Pos	Team	Pld	W	D	L	GF	GA	GD	Pts
1	Pisa (D)	2	2	0	0	4	1	+3	6
2	Gavorrano (E)	2	0	1	1	1	2	−1	1
3	Chieti (F)	2	0	1	1	2	4	−2	1

Gavorrano (E)	0–1	Pisa (D)	played May 30, 2010
Chieti (F)	1–1	Gavorrano (E)	played June 6, 2010
Pisa (D)	3–1	Chieti (F)	played June 13, 2010

==== Group 3 ====
Pos	Team	Pld	W	D	L	GF	GA	GD	Pts
1	Neapolis Mugnano (H)	2	2	0	0	5	2	+3	6
2	Milazzo (I)	2	0	1	1	3	4	−1	1
3	Fondi (G)	2	0	1	1	1	3	−2	1

Milazzo (I)	1–1	Fondi (G)	played May 30, 2010
Neapolis Mugnano (H)	3–2	Milazzo (I)	played June 6, 2010
Fondi (G)	0–2	Neapolis Mugnano (H)	played June 13, 2010

=== Semi-finals ===
One leg played June 17, 2010

- On neutral ground at Forli, Stadio Comunale "Tullo Morgagni"'

Team 1	Score	Team 2
Pisa (D)	1-3	Savona (A)

- On neutral ground at Sant'Arcangelo Romagna

Team 1	Score	Team 2
Neapolis Mugnano (H)	1-3	Montichiari (C)

=== Final ===
Played on June 26, 2010

- On neutral ground at Forlì, Stadio Comunale "Tullo Morgagni".

Team 1	Score	Team 2
Savona (A)	0-3	Montichiari (C)

Winner:Montichiari

== Tie-breakers ==
- Before the promotion playoffs and relegation playout could begin, two tie-breakers needed to be played.

Girone I – 5th-6th place – played May 22, 2010

Team 1	Score	Team 2
Avellino	1-0	Rossanese

The winner Avellino is qualified to promotion playoffs and the loser Rossanese remained in Serie D.

Girone F – 12th-13th place – played May 30, 2010

Team 1	Score	Team 2
Bojano	1-1(Pen.5-4)	Angolana

The winner Bojano remained in Serie D and the loser Angolana is forced to play in relegation playout.

== Promotion playoffs ==
Promotion playoffs involved a total of 37 teams; four from each of the nine Serie D divisions (teams placed from 2nd through to 5th) with Matera, winner of Coppa Italia Serie D that is directly admitted to the Semi-final round.

=== Rules ===
- The first two rounds were one-legged matches played in the home field of the best-placed team.
- The games ending in ties were extended to extra time. New for the 2007–08 season, the higher classified team was declared the winner if the game was still tied after extra time. Penalty kicks were not taken.
- Round one matched 2nd & 5th-placed teams, and 3rd & 4th-placed teams within each division.
- The two winners from each division played each other in the second round.
- The nine winners – one each from the nine Serie D divisions – were then split into three groups of three teams each. Every team played two matches, one against each of the other two opponents within the group. The three group winners qualified for the semifinal round, joining Matera.
- The semi-finals were two-legged matches, and the respective winners moved on to play in a one-legged final hosted in a neutral ground.
- The tournament results provided a list, starting with the winner, by which vacancies could be filled in Lega Pro Seconda Divisione

=== First round ===
- Played on May 26, 2010
- Single-legged matches played at best placed club home field: 2nd-placed team plays home 5th-placed team, 3rd-placed home team plays home 4th placed team
- Games ending in a tie are extended to extra time, if still tied, the higher-classified team wins

Team 1	Score	Team 2
Virtus Entella (A2)	3–1	(A5) Sarzanese
Casale Calcio (A3)	2–1	(A4) Albese
AlzanoCene (B2)	0–3	(B5) Renate
Pontisola (B3)	0–3	(B4) Darfo Boario
Este(C2)	1–2	(C5) Union Quinto
Venezia (C3)	1–0	(C4) Jesolo
Carpi (D2)	6–0	(D5) Santarcangelo
Fossombrone (D3)	0–1	(D4) Chioggia Sottomarina
Guidonia (E2)	2–1	(E5) Monterotondo
Castel Rigone (E3)	1–0	(E4) Group Castello
Santegidiese (F2)	5–3	(F5) Civitanovese
Val di Sangro (F3)	1–0	(F4) L'Aquila
Gaeta (G2)	1–2	(G5) Selargius
Pomezia (G3)	2–2(aet)	(G4) Sanluri
Pianura (H2)	6–1	(H5) Sant'Antonio Abate
Virtus Casarano (H4)	2–3	(H4) Forza e Coraggio
Trapani (I2)	1–2(aet)	(I5) Avellino
Rosarno (I3)	0–2	(I4) Vigor Lamezia

=== Second round ===
- Played on May 30, 2010
- Single-legged matches played at best placed club home field
- Games ending in a tie are extended to extra time, if still tied, the higher-classified team wins

Team 1	Score	Team 2
Virtus Entella (A2)	0–1	(A3) Casale
Darfo Boario (B4)	0–2	(B5) Renate
Venezia (C3)	0–2	(C5) Union Quinto
Carpi (D2)	3-1	(D4) Chioggia Sottomarina
Guidonia (E2)	2–3	(E3) Castel Rigone
Santegidiese (F2)	3–3(aet)	(F3) Val di Sangro
Pomezia (G3)	3–0	(G5) Selargius
Pianura (H2)	4-1	(H4) Forza e Coraggio
Vigor Lamezia (I4)	1–0	(I5) Avellino

=== Third round ===
- group winners qualify for semi-finals

==== Triangular 1 ====
Pos	Team	Pld	W	D	L	GF	GA	GD	Pts
1	Pomezia (G3)	2	1	0	1	9	7	+2	3
2	Union Quinto (C5)	2	1	0	1	6	4	+2	3
3	Castel Rigone (E3)	2	1	0	1	4	8	−4	3

Castel Rigone (E3)	2–1	Union Quinto (C5)	June 6, 2010
Union Quinto (C5)	5–2	Pomezia (G3)	June 9, 2010
Pomezia (G3)	7–2	Castel Rigone (E3)	June 13, 2010

==== Triangular 2 ====
Pos	Team	Pld	W	D	L	GF	GA	GD	Pts
1	Carpi (D2)	2	1	1	0	5	2	+3	6
2	Vigor Lamezia (I4)	2	0	1	1	2	3	−1	1
3	Renate (B5)	2	0	1	1	2	4	−2	1

Renate (B5)	1–1	(I4) Vigor Lamezia	June 6, 2010
Carpi (D2)	3–1	(B5) Renate	June 9, 2010
Vigor Lamezia (I4)	1–2	(D2) Carpi	June 13, 2010

==== Triangular 3 ====
Pos	Team	Pld	W	D	L	GF	GA	GD	Pts
1	Pianura (H2)	2	1	0	1	5	0	+5	4
2	Casale (A3)	2	0	2	0	1	1	0	2
3	Santegidiese (F2)	2	1	0	1	1	6	−5	1

Pianura (H3)	5–0	(F2) Santegidiese	June 6, 2010
Santegidiese (F2)	1–1	(A3) Casale	June 9, 2010
Casale (A3)	0–0	(H3) Pianura	June 13, 2010

=== Semi-finals ===
First legs played June 16, 2010; return legs played June 20, 2010

Matera qualified directly as winner of Coppa Italia Serie D

Team 1	Agg.	Team 2	1st leg	2nd leg
Carpi (D2)	7-8	Pianura (H2)	5-0	2-8
Pomezia (G3)	1-3	Matera	1-0	0-3

=== Final ===
Played on June 27, 2010 on neutral ground at Chieti, Stadio "Guido Angelini".

Team 1	Score	Team 2
Pianura (H2)	0-1	Matera

Winner:Matera

== Relegation playout ==
Played May 30 & June 6, 2010
In case of aggregate tie score, higher classified team wins
Team highlighted in green saved, other is relegated to Eccellenza

Team 1	Agg.	Team 2	1st leg	2nd leg
Pro Settimo (A16)	2-2	(A14) Rivoli	0-2	2-0
Borgosesia (B16)	2-1	(B13) US Sestese	1-1	1-0
Caratese (B15)	5-3	(B14) Fiorenzuola	3-3	2-0
Castel San Pietro (D17)	2-3	(D16) Valleverde Riccione	0-1	2-2
Sporting Terni (E16)	3-3	(E13) Orvietana	1-2	2-1
Monteriggioni (E15)	1-1	(E14) Pontevecchio	1-0	0-1
Centobuchi (F16)	1-4	(F13) Angolana	1-2	0-2
Morro d'Oro (F15)	3-4	(F14) Luco Canistro	2-2	1-2
Arzachena(G16)	2-6	(G13) Boville Ernica	2-2	0-4
Castelsardo (G15)	3-3	(G14) Astrea	2-1	1-2
Pisticci (H16)	1-0	(H13) Bitonto	0-0	1-0
Ischia Isolaverde (H15)	2-1	(H14) Bacoli Sibilla	0-0	2-1
Viribus Unitis (I15)	4-2	(I14) AC Palazzolo	1-1	3-1
