= 2011–12 Lega Pro Seconda Divisione =

Lega Pro Seconda Divisione
- Season: 2011–12

The 2011–12 Lega Pro Seconda Divisione season was the thirty-fourth football league season of Italian Lega Pro Seconda Divisione since its establishment in 1978, and the fourth since the renaming from Serie C to Lega Pro.

It was divided into two phases: the regular season, and the playoff phase.

Historically, the league was composed of 54 teams divided into three divisions of 18 teams each. This year, due to a significant reduction in qualified teams, it was decided that the league would be composed of 40 teams divided into two divisions (gironi) divided geographically. Catanzaro was re-admitted to the league after being previously excluded, increasing the number of teams to 41. Girone A is composed of 20 teams, and girone B is composed of 21 teams.

Teams finishing first and second in the regular season, plus one team winning the playoff round from each division will be promoted to Lega Pro Prima Divisione. The last three teams in the regular season, plus one relegation play-out loser from each division will be relegated to Serie D. The two relegation play-out winners, one from each division, will play each other and the loser will become the ninth team relegated. In all, six teams will be promoted to Lega Pro Prima Divisione, and nine teams will be relegated to Serie D.

== Events ==
=== Before the start of the season ===
On 1 July 2011 Lega Pro announces that four teams (Canavese, Crociati Noceto, Rodengo Saiano, Sangiovannese) would not join the Seconda Divisione League for 2011–12 season.

On 12 July Brindisi, Cavese, Cosenza, Matera and Sanremese did not appeal against the exclusion and were consequently relegated to Eccellenza or lower divisions.

On 9 August 2011 Alessandria relegated to the last place in 2010–11 Lega Pro Prima Divisione by Italian national disciplinary committee for match fixing. Monza readmitted in Lega Pro Prima Divisione in its place.

=== Winter champions ===
The winter champions were Casale in Group A and Perugia in Group B.

== Girone A ==
=== Teams ===
Location of teams in Girone A 2011–12

Club	City	Stadium	Capacity	2010–11 season
Alessandria	Alessandria	Giuseppe Moccagatta	5,827	18th in Lega Pro Prima Divisione A
Bellaria Igea	Bellaria-Igea Marina	Enrico Nanni	2,500	9th in Lega Pro Seconda Divisione B
Borgo a Buggiano	Buggiano	Alberto Benedetti	2,000	1st in Serie D Girone D
Casale	Casale Monferrato	Natale Palli	4,000	10th in Lega Pro Seconda Divisione A
Cuneo	Cuneo	Fratelli Paschiero	4,000	1st in Serie D Girone A
Giacomense	Masi Torello (playing in Portomaggiore)	Savino Bellini	2,500	7th in Lega Pro Seconda Divisione B
Lecco	Lecco	Rigamonti-Ceppi	4,977	7th in Lega Pro Seconda Divisione A
Mantova	Mantova	Danilo Martelli	14,884	1st in Serie D Girone B
Montichiari	Montichiari	Romeo Menti	2,500	8th in Lega Pro Seconda Divisione A
Poggibonsi	Poggibonsi	Stefano Lotti	3,600	8th in Lega Pro Seconda Divisione B
Pro Patria	Busto Arsizio	Carlo Speroni	4,627	4th in Lega Pro Seconda Divisione A
Renate	Renate (playing in Meda)	Città di Meda	3,000	5th in Lega Pro Seconda Divisione A
Rimini	Rimini	Romeo Neri	9,768	3rd in Serie D Girone F
Sambonifacese	San Bonifacio	Renzo Tizian	1,450	12th in Lega Pro Seconda Divisione A
San Marino	Serravalle	Olimpico	7,000	5th in Lega Pro Seconda Divisione B
Santarcangelo	Santarcangelo di Romagna	Valentino Mazzola	2,000	1st in Serie D Girone F
Savona	Savona	Valerio Bacigalupo	4,900	6th in Lega Pro Seconda Divisione A
Treviso	Treviso	Omobono Tenni	10,000	1st in Serie D Girone C
Valenzana	Valenza	Comunale	2,200	13th in Lega Pro Seconda Divisione A
Virtus Entella	Chiavari	Comunale	2,500	14th in Lega Pro Seconda Divisione A

=== League table ===
Pos	Team	Pld	W	D	L	GF	GA	GD	Pts	Promotion or relegation
1	Treviso (C, P)	38	19	12	7	59	33	+26	67 (Note: Treviso was docked 2 points for financial irregularities.)	Promotion to Lega Pro Prima Divisione
2	San Marino (P)	38	19	9	10	65	41	+24	66	Promotion to Lega Pro Prima Divisione
3	Cuneo (O, P)	38	19	8	11	60	47	+13	65	Qualification for Promotion play-off
4	Casale	38	17	11	10	50	32	+18	62	Qualification for Promotion play-off
5	Virtus Entella (P)	38	17	10	11	61	37	+24	61 (Note: Virtus Entella promoted to Lega Pro Prima Divisione after repechage to fill the vacancies created.)	Qualification for Promotion play-off
6	Rimini	38	17	10	11	43	40	+3	61	Qualification for Promotion play-off
7	Pro Patria	38	19	14	5	58	36	+22	60 (Note: Pro Patria was docked 11 points due to financial irregularities.)	
8	Santarcangelo	38	16	6	16	46	42	+4	54	
9	Poggibonsi	38	15	9	14	50	49	+1	54	
10	Borgo a Buggiano	38	14	9	15	46	46	0	51	
11	Alessandria	38	13	13	12	45	45	0	49 (Note: Alessandria was docked 3 points for financial irregularities.)	
12	Renate	38	11	15	12	40	44	−4	48	
13	Savona	38	13	14	11	47	41	+6	46 (Note: Savona was docked 7 points for financial irregularities.)	
14	Bellaria Igea	38	10	15	13	39	45	−6	45	
15	Giacomense	38	10	15	13	46	53	−7	45	
16	Mantova	38	10	14	14	44	49	−5	44	Qualification for Relegation play-off
17	Lecco (R)	38	9	10	19	34	66	−32	37	Qualification for Relegation play-off
18	Montichiari (R)	38	9	13	16	48	59	−11	35 (Note: Montichiari was docked 5 points for financial irregularities.)	Excluded from Italian football after bankruptcy
19	Sambonifacese (R)	38	6	8	24	37	80	−43	26	Relegation to Serie D
20	Valenzana (R)	38	5	9	24	28	63	−35	24	Relegation to Eccellenza (Note: Valenzana Mado, the new club founded after the merger between Valenzana and Mado, renounces to Serie D to start instead from Eccellenza.)

Updated to match(es) played on 6 May 2012. Source: Lega-pro.com
Rules for classification: 1) points; 2) goal difference; 3) number of goals scored.
(C) Champions; (O) Play-off winners; (P) Promoted; (R) Relegated

=== Results ===
Home \ Away	ALE	BEL	BOR	CSL	CUN	GIA	LCO	MAN	MCH	POG	PPA	REN	RIM	SMB	SMR	SNT	SVN	TRV	VAL	VET
Alessandria		3–1	1–4	1–1	1–2	2–1	0–1	1–1	2–1	3–1	1–1	2–1	2–1	2–3	0–0	1–0	2–0	1–4	1–0	0–0
Bellaria Igea	1–2		0–0	2–1	2–1	1–1	1–1	2–1	2–2	1–1	0–2	1–1	1–1	1–1	1–2	0–0	1–1	1–1	1–0	2–1
Borgo a Buggiano	1–2	2–0		0–1	3–2	2–0	1–0	1–2	0–1	1–0	2–4	1–1	2–1	0–0	1–2	0–2	0–1	1–0	3–0	0–1
Casale	0–0	1–3	0–2		0–1	3–1	2–0	1–0	3–2	1–0	1–1	0–0	0–0	2–0	4–3	3–0	1–0	0–1	6–0	0–1
Cuneo	1–1	1–3	1–1	2–0		2–1	4–0	1–0	0–0	1–3	0–3	1–1	0–1	4–1	2–1	1–0	4–3	0–0	1–0	2–1
Giacomense	1–0	2–0	0–0	2–4	2–0		1–2	2–2	2–2	2–2	0–0	2–1	0–0	5–2	0–0	0–4	2–0	0–3	0–0	2–0
Lecco	2–1	0–5	1–1	2–2	0–2	2–2		3–2	1–2	2–2	1–2	0–0	1–2	2–1	2–1	2–1	1–4	0–2	0–0	0–3
Mantova	1–1	1–2	2–3	0–0	2–1	3–3	1–1		2–2	0–3	2–2	1–0	0–1	1–0	0–0	3–0	1–1	3–0	2–0	0–0
Montichiari	0–0	1–1	2–3	2–3	2–1	1–2	2–1	0–1		2–0	0–1	1–1	3–3	0–2	1–1	0–0	1–1	2–3	2–1	1–1
Poggibonsi	2–1	0–0	1–1	0–1	1–3	1–1	1–0	1–0	5–2		1–0	2–0	0–1	1–1	1–2	1–0	3–1	2–2	1–0	2–0
Pro Patria	1–0	0–0	2–0	1–0	2–3	0–0	3–0	3–2	1–1	1–1		0–2	3–0	4–0	1–0	0–3	1–1	2–2	0–0	4–2
Renate	0–2	1–0	1–3	0–0	1–0	3–1	1–1	2–2	3–0	4–2	0–0		1–1	2–0	1–0	1–0	1–1	0–1	2–1	0–2
Rimini	1–0	2–1	2–0	0–2	1–0	0–0	2–0	0–0	1–2	3–0	2–3	2–1		3–0	2–1	0–1	2–2	0–2	1–0	2–1
Sambonifacese	3–3	0–1	0–1	0–2	2–2	0–4	2–0	4–0	0–1	0–3	3–3	1–1	1–2		1–4	2–0	0–2	0–2	2–1	0–0
San Marino	1–1	2–0	3–2	3–1	1–1	3–0	4–1	2–2	4–3	3–1	0–1	4–1	1–0	3–1		0–0	3–1	1–0	2–0	3–2
Santarcangelo	0–1	2–0	1–0	1–1	2–5	2–3	1–2	1–0	3–2	2–3	0–1	3–1	3–0	2–1	1–1		1–0	1–0	2–0	1–0
Savona	1–1	3–0	1–1	1–0	0–1	2–0	0–1	1–0	1–0	3–1	1–2	1–1	1–1	2–1	1–0	2–0		1–1	2–1	1–1
Treviso	3–1	1–1	1–1	0–0	2–3	1–0	0–0	1–2	2–1	1–0	2–0	0–1	2–2	6–0	2–0	1–1	2–1		2–1	2–1
Valenzana	1–1	2–0	3–2	0–3	3–3	1–1	3–0	0–2	1–0	0–1	1–2	2–2	0–1	3–2	0–3	2–4	0–0	0–3		1–1
Virtus Entella	2–1	1–0	4–0	0–0	0–1	2–0	2–1	3–0	0–1	3–0	2–2	3–0	6–2	5–0	2–1	2–1	2–2	2–2	2–0	

Updated to match(es) played on 6 May 2012. Source: Lega Pro
Legend: Blue = home team win; Yellow = draw; Red = away team win.

=== Promotion Playoffs ===
==== Semifinals ====
First legs scheduled 20 May 2012; return legs scheduled 27 May 2012

Team 1	Agg.	Team 2	1st leg	2nd leg
Rimini (6)	0–1	(3) Cuneo	0–0	0–1
Virtus Entella (5)	5–4	(4) Casale	3–2	2–2

==== Final ====
First leg scheduled 3 June 2012; return leg scheduled 10 June 2012

Team 1	Agg.	Team 2	1st leg	2nd leg
Virtus Entella (5)	3–6	(3) Cuneo	1–1	2–5

Cuneo promoted to Lega Pro Prima Divisione.

== Girone B ==
=== Teams ===
Location of teams in Girone B 2011–12

Club	City	Stadium	Capacity	2010–11 season
Aprilia	Aprilia	Quinto Ricci	2,000	1st in Serie D Girone G
Arzanese	Arzano (playing in Frattamaggiore)	Pasquale Ianniello	4,000	1st in Serie D Girone H
Aversa Normanna	Aversa	Augusto Bisceglia	2,565	6th in Lega Pro Seconda Divisione C
Campobasso	Campobasso	Romagnoli	21,800	11th in Lega Pro Seconda Divisione C
Catanzaro	Catanzaro	Nicola Ceravolo	13,619	15th in Lega Pro Seconda Divisione C
Celano	Celano	Fabio Piccone	3,200	13th in Lega Pro Seconda Divisione B
Chieti	Chieti	Guido Angelini	12,750	6th in Lega Pro Seconda Divisione B
Ebolitana	Eboli	José Guimarães Dirceu	15,000	1st in Serie D Girone I
Fano	Fano	Raffaele Mancini	8,800	15th in Lega Pro Seconda Divisione B
Fondi	Fondi	Domenico Purificato	2,500	12th in Lega Pro Seconda Divisione C
Gavorrano	Gavorrano	Romeo Malservisi	2,000	10th in Lega Pro Seconda Divisione B
Giulianova	Giulianova	Rubens Fadini	5,625	11th in Lega Pro Seconda Divisione B
Isola Liri	Isola del Liri	Conte Arduino Mangoni	3,400	9th in Lega Pro Seconda Divisione C
L'Aquila	L'Aquila	Tommaso Fattori	9,285	4th in Lega Pro Seconda Divisione B
Melfi	Melfi	Arturo Valerio	4,500	8th in Lega Pro Seconda Divisione C
Milazzo	Milazzo	Grotta Polifemo	2,500	3rd in Lega Pro Seconda Divisione C
Neapolis Mugnano^{1}	Mugnano di Napoli	Alberto Vallefuoco	2,500	5th in Lega Pro Seconda Divisione C
Paganese	Pagani	Marcello Torre	5,900	17th in Lega Pro Prima Divisione A
Perugia	Perugia	Renato Curi	28,000	1st in Serie D Girone E
Vibonese	Vibo Valentia	Luigi Razza	4,500	14th in Lega Pro Seconda Divisione C
Vigor Lamezia	Lamezia Terme	Guido D'Ippolito	4,000	10th in Lega Pro Seconda Divisione C

^{1}Initially played in Stadio Pasquale Iannello in Frattamaggiore as Neapolis Frattese, but returned in Mugnano di Napoli in December 2011.

=== League table ===
Pos	Team	Pld	W	D	L	GF	GA	GD	Pts	Promotion or relegation
1	Perugia (C, P)	40	26	9	5	65	29	+36	87	Promotion to Lega Pro Prima Divisione
2	Catanzaro (P)	40	23	14	3	66	29	+37	83	Promotion to Lega Pro Prima Divisione
3	Vigor Lamezia	40	23	11	6	57	27	+30	80	Qualification for Promotion play-off
4	Chieti	40	20	9	11	55	38	+17	69	Qualification for Promotion play-off
5	Aprilia	40	18	11	11	60	44	+16	65	Qualification for Promotion play-off
6	Paganese (O, P)	40	17	14	9	47	37	+10	65	Qualification for Promotion play-off
7	Gavorrano	40	16	14	10	69	54	+15	62	
8	L'Aquila	40	15	15	10	38	31	+7	60	
9	Arzanese	40	14	13	13	50	55	−5	55	
10	Fano	40	16	10	14	48	48	0	54 (Note: Fano was docked 4 points for financial irregularities.)	
11	Aversa Normanna	40	12	12	16	31	37	−6	47 (Note: Campobasso, Aversa Normanna and Vibonese were docked 1 point for financial irregularities.)	
12	Fondi	40	11	12	17	41	49	−8	45	
13	Campobasso	40	11	12	17	38	47	−9	44 (Note: Campobasso 13th about the direct clashes.)	
14	Giulianova (R)	40	12	10	18	39	51	−12	44 (Note: Giulianova, Isola Liri and Neapolis Mugnano were docked 2 points for financial irregularities.)	Excluded from Italian football not joining 2012–13 championship
15	Milazzo	40	9	17	14	44	46	−2	44	
16	Melfi	40	11	13	16	46	50	−4	43 (Note: Ebolitana and Melfi were docked 3 points for financial irregularities. Later, was excluded from Serie D by Covisod.)	
17	Vibonese (R)	40	9	15	16	41	51	−10	41	Qualification for Relegation play-off
18	Neapolis Mugnano (R)	40	10	12	18	42	59	−17	40	Qualification for Relegation play-off
19	Isola Liri (R)	40	8	10	22	39	62	−23	32	Relegation to Serie D
20	Ebolitana (R)	40	7	13	20	34	62	−28	31	Excluded from Italian football after the non-admission of the Federal Council
21	Celano (R)	40	7	4	29	31	75	−44	25	Relegation to Serie D

Updated to match(es) played on 6 May 2012. Source: Lega-pro.com
Rules for classification: 1) points; 2) goal difference; 3) number of goals scored.
(C) Champions; (O) Play-off winners; (P) Promoted; (R) Relegated

=== Results ===
Home \ Away	APR	ARZ	AVN	CAM	CTZ	CEL	CHT	EBO	FAN	FON	GAV	GIU	ILI	LAQ	MEL	MLZ	NEA	PAG	PER	VIB	VLA
Aprilia		3–1	1–0	0–2	1–1	3–1	2–2	1–0	0–0	3–1	2–1	3–3	2–1	1–2	1–1	2–2	2–0	3–0	0–1	3–2	3–0
Arzanese	0–2		1–0	2–0	1–0	3–2	0–3	3–2	0–0	1–0	4–3	3–1	0–1	0–1	2–2	1–1	1–0	1–3	1–1	0–1	1–4
Aversa Normanna	1–1	0–1		2–1	2–1	1–0	2–0	0–0	1–0	2–0	0–1	0–2	2–0	2–0	2–2	2–2	0–1	1–0	2–1	0–0	0–4
Campobasso	0–2	1–1	1–0		2–2	0–1	0–3	3–1	1–3	2–1	2–2	1–0	2–1	0–0	0–2	2–1	3–0	0–1	1–2	0–0	0–1
Catanzaro	3–2	3–1	1–0	2–1		1–0	2–1	1–0	4–1	2–0	2–0	3–3	5–0	0–0	2–0	1–1	3–0	2–1	1–0	0–0	1–0
Celano	1–5	2–1	0–1	0–2	0–3		0–1	2–2	0–1	2–0	0–2	0–2	0–0	1–0	1–0	2–0	1–2	1–0	0–4	3–5	1–1
Chieti	1–1	1–1	0–2	2–0	2–2	1–1		1–0	2–1	3–0	2–0	2–0	3–1	0–0	2–1	1–0	1–2	2–1	0–1	2–1	1–0
Ebolitana	0–0	3–2	1–1	2–0	1–2	3–1	1–1		2–4	0–1	1–6	2–1	2–0	1–1	0–3	0–1	1–1	0–0	1–3	1–1	0–0
Fano	1–1	2–1	0–0	1–1	1–2	3–2	0–2	0–1		1–0	0–1	1–2	0–0	2–1	1–0	1–0	3–1	1–1	1–3	2–1	1–1
Fondi	2–3	2–2	1–0	1–1	1–1	5–2	2–0	2–0	1–1		2–2	2–1	1–1	2–0	1–1	0–1	2–1	0–1	0–2	2–1	0–1
Gavorrano	0–1	0–0	2–2	1–2	2–2	2–0	2–1	3–1	2–1	2–0		3–0	3–1	1–1	2–2	1–1	2–2	1–1	0–2	3–2	2–2
Giulianova	1–0	1–2	1–0	1–1	1–1	1–0	0–1	1–0	0–2	1–1	2–0		2–1	0–3	0–2	3–1	0–1	0–1	0–1	3–1	0–0
Isola Liri	2–0	0–0	4–0	0–1	0–0	4–1	0–1	1–1	1–2	2–0	1–0	1–1		1–2	2–1	0–5	2–2	2–2	0–2	0–2	1–3
L'Aquila	0–1	2–2	1–0	0–0	1–1	1–0	1–1	3–0	2–1	0–0	1–4	2–0	0–0		4–1	0–0	1–2	0–0	0–1	1–0	1–0
Melfi	1–3	0–1	0–0	1–0	0–0	4–0	2–1	1–0	1–2	0–0	0–1	2–0	1–2	0–0		2–2	3–2	1–1	0–2	1–1	1–0
Milazzo	0–0	2–2	1–1	1–1	1–2	2–1	2–1	3–1	1–1	1–1	2–1	0–1	3–2	0–1	3–1		0–0	0–2	0–0	1–1	0–1
Neapolis Mugnano	3–2	1–1	2–1	3–3	0–2	2–1	0–2	0–0	1–2	2–3	1–2	1–1	2–0	0–1	0–3	1–1		0–1	1–2	2–2	0–0
Paganese	2–0	1–1	1–0	1–1	1–1	2–0	1–2	1–1	2–1	1–0	3–4	2–1	2–1	1–1	3–1	1–0	1–1		0–0	2–1	0–2
Perugia	2–0	0–1	0–0	1–1	0–2	2–0	4–2	3–1	4–1	1–1	1–1	3–1	2–1	2–1	2–0	2–1	2–1	2–1		0–0	3–2
Vibonese	2–0	1–2	2–1	1–0	0–2	1–0	1–1	0–1	1–2	0–3	2–2	0–0	3–2	0–1	1–1	1–0	0–1	1–1	1–1		0–0
Vigor Lamezia	1–0	3–2	0–0	1–0	1–0	2–1	1–0	4–0	1–0	1–0	2–2	1–1	1–0	3–1	3–1	2–1	1–0	1–1	2–0	4–1	

Updated to match(es) played on 6 May 2012. Source: Lega Pro
Legend: Blue = home team win; Yellow = draw; Red = away team win.

=== Promotion Playoffs ===
==== Semifinals ====
First legs scheduled 20 May 2012; return legs scheduled 27 May 2012

Team 1	Agg.	Team 2	1st leg	2nd leg
Paganese (6)	2–0	(3) Vigor Lamezia	1–0	1–0
Aprilia (5)	3–3	(4) Chieti	2–2	1–1

==== Final ====
First leg scheduled 3 June 2012; return leg scheduled 10 June 2012

Team 1	Agg.	Team 2	1st leg	2nd leg
Paganese(6)	2–0	(4)Chieti	2–0	0–0

Paganese promoted to Lega Pro Prima Divisione.

== Relegation play-off ==
- only Finals winner is saved from relegation
- other 3 teams are relegated to Serie D

=== Semifinals ===
==== Girone A ====
First legs scheduled 19 May 2012; return legs scheduled 27 May 2012

Team 1	Agg.	Team 2	1st leg	2nd leg
Lecco(17)	2–3	(16)Mantova	1–1	1–2

Lecco relegated to Serie D

==== Girone B ====
First legs scheduled 20 May 2012; return legs scheduled 27 May 2012

Team 1	Agg.	Team 2	1st leg	2nd leg
Neapolis Mugnano(18)	0–3	(17)Vibonese	0–1	0–2

Neapolis Mugnano relegated to Serie D

=== Final ===
First leg scheduled 3 June 2012; return leg scheduled 10 June 2012

Team 1	Agg.	Team 2	1st leg	2nd leg
Vibonese(B 17)	0–4	(A 16)Mantova	0–0	0–4

Vibonese relegated to Serie D
