= 2010–11 Lega Pro Seconda Divisione =

Lega Pro Seconda Divisione
- Season: 2010–11
- Champions: Tritium (group A); Carpi (group B); Latina (group C)
- Promoted: Tritium, FeralpiSalò (group A); Carpi, Carrarese (group B); Latina, Trapani (group C)
- Relegated: Sacilese, Mezzocorona (group A); Villacidrese (group B); Pomezia (group C)

The 2010–11 Lega Pro Seconda Divisione season was the thirty-third football league season of Italian Lega Pro Seconda Divisione since its establishment in 1978, and the third since the renaming from Serie C to Lega Pro.

It was divided into two phases: the regular season, and the playoff phase.

The league is usually composed of 54 teams divided into three divisions of 18 teams each. This year, only 49 teams met the financial criteria of the league. They will be divided geographically into three divisions of 17, 16 and 16 teams. Teams will play only other teams in their own division, once at home and once away. The 17-team division teams will play 32 matches each, while the 16-team division teams will play 30 matches each.

Teams finishing first in the regular season, plus one team winning the playoff round from each division will be promoted to Lega Pro Prima Divisione.

Usually, three teams from each division are relegated to Serie D; the team finishing last and two relegation playoff losers. In order for the league's team total to rise to the normal 54 teams for the 2011–12 season, fewer teams will be relegated this year.

- In the group A of 17 teams will be relegated the 17th and the 16th, if the 15th place is more of 5 points ahead of this; otherwise the relegation playout loser between 15th and 16th place.
- In the group B and C of 16 teams, will be relegated the 16th, if the 15th place is more of 5 points ahead of this; otherwise the relegation playout loser between 15th and 16th place, with only one team being relegated from each of those divisions.

In all, six teams will be promoted to Prima Divisione, and four teams will be relegated to Serie D.

== Events ==
=== Start of season ===
Given a normal season where there are no team failures and special promotions, Lega Pro Seconda Divisione would feature 6 teams that had been relegated from Lega Pro Prima Divisione, 9 teams that had been promoted from Serie D, and 39 teams had played in Lega Pro Seconda Divisione the year before. Due to twenty-one bankruptcies and non-admissions in the Serie B (one vacancy), Lega Pro Prima Divisione (seven vacancies) and Lega Pro Seconda Divisione (thirteen vacancies) the 2010–11 season was to feature only 3 teams that played in 2009–10 Lega Pro Prima Divisione, 20 teams that played in 2009-10 Serie D, 1 team that played in Eccellenza and 25 teams that played in 2009–10 Lega Pro Seconda Divisione. The league admitted sixteen teams to fill vacancies created. These teams are:

- Pro Vercelli (formerly P.B. Vercelli): P.B. Vercelli finished 17th in Lega Pro Seconda Divisione A and was originally relegated for losing in the play out, while the ex Pro Vercelli finished 10th.
- Bellaria Igea which finished 16th in Lega Pro Seconda Divisione B, originally relegated for losing in the playoffs.
- Carrarese which finished 18th in Lega Pro Seconda Divisione B, originally relegated for finishing at last place.
- Virtus Entella which finished 2nd in Serie D 2009-10 Girone A
- Casale which finished 3rd in Serie D 2009-10 Girone A
- Renate which finished 5th in Serie D 2009-10 Girone B
- Carpi which finished 2nd in Serie D 2009-10 Girone D
- L'Aquila which finished 4th in Serie D 2009-10 Girone F
- Campobasso which finished 10th in Serie D 2009-10 Girone F
- Pomezia which finished 3rd in Serie D 2009-10 Girone G
- Latina which finished 9th in Serie D 2009-10 Girone G
- Matera which finished 9th in Serie D 2009-10 Girone H
- Trapani which finished 2nd in Serie D 2009-10 Girone I
- Vigor Lamezia which finished 4th in Serie D 2009-10 Girone I
- Avellino which finished 5th in Serie D 2009-10 Girone I
- Sanremese which finished 1st in Eccellenza Liguria 2009-10

Five vacancies remained because no other teams filled for the spots.

== Teams ==
=== Girone A ===
Club	City	Stadium	Capacity	2009–10 season
Canavese	San Giusto Canavese	Stadio Franco Cerutti	2,510	13th in Lega Pro Seconda Divisione A
Casale	Casale Monferrato	Stadio Natale Palli	6,035	3rd in Serie D/A
Virtus Entella	Chiavari	Stadio Comunale	2,000	2nd in Serie D/A
FeralpiSalò	Salò and Lonato del Garda (playing in Salò)	Stadio Lino Turina	2,000	4th in Lega Pro Seconda Divisione A
Lecco	Lecco	Stadio Rigamonti-Ceppi	4,977	18th in Lega Pro Prima Divisione A
Mezzocorona	Mezzocorona (playing in Trento)	Stadio Briamasco	4,277	14th in Lega Pro Seconda Divisione A
Montichiari	Montichiari	Stadio Romeo Menti	2,500	1st in Serie D/C
Pro Patria	Busto Arsizio	Stadio Carlo Speroni	4,200	16th in Lega Pro Prima Divisione A
Pro Vercelli	Vercelli	Stadio Silvio Piola	6,165	17th in Lega Pro Seconda Divisione A (as P.B. Vercelli)
Renate	Renate (playing in Meda)	Stadio Città di Meda	3,000	5th Serie D/B
Rodengo Saiano	Rodengo-Saiano	Stadio Comunale	2,500	7th in Lega Pro Seconda Divisione A
Sacilese	Sacile	Stadio XXV Aprile - Aldo Castenetto	2,600	11th in Lega Pro Seconda Divisione B
Sambonifacese	San Bonifacio	Stadio Renzo Tizian	1,450	11th in Lega Pro Seconda Divisione A
Sanremese	Sanremo	Stadio Comunale	4,000	1st in Eccellenza Liguria
Savona	Savona	Stadio Valerio Bacigalupo	5,500	1st in Serie D/A
Tritium	Trezzo sull'Adda	Stadio Comunale	3,000	1st in Serie D/B
Valenzana	Valenza	Stadio Comunale	2,200	10th in Lega Pro Seconda Divisione A

=== Girone B ===
Club	City	Stadium	Capacity	2009–10 season
Bellaria Igea	Bellaria-Igea Marina	Stadio Enrico Nanni	2,500	16th in Lega Pro Seconda Divisione B
Carpi	Carpi	Stadio Sandro Cabassi	4,760	2nd in Serie D/D
Carrarese	Carrara	Stadio dei Marmi	15,000	18th in Lega Pro Seconda Divisione B
Celano	Celano	Stadio Fabio Piccone	3,200	10th in Lega Pro Seconda Divisione B
Chieti	Chieti	Stadio Guido Angelini	12,750	1st in Serie D/F
Crociati Noceto	Noceto	Stadio Il Noce	1,000	8th in Lega Pro Seconda Divisione A
Fano	Fano	Stadio Raffaele Mancini	8,800	4th in Lega Pro Seconda Divisione B
Gavorrano	Gavorrano	Stadio Romeo Malservisi	2,000	1st Serie D/E
Giacomense	Masi Torello (playing in Portomaggiore)	Stadio Savino Bellini	2,000	14th in Lega Pro Seconda Divisione B
Giulianova	Giulianova	Stadio Rubens Fadini	5,625	18th in Lega Pro Prima Divisione B
L'Aquila	L'Aquila	Stadio Tommaso Fattori	9,285	4th in Serie D/F
Poggibonsi	Poggibonsi	Stadio Stefano Lotti	3,621	15th in Lega Pro Seconda Divisione B
Prato	Prato	Stadio Lungobisenzio	6,800	6th in Lega Pro Seconda Divisione B
San Marino	Serravalle, San Marino	Stadio Olimpico	7,000	2nd in Lega Pro Seconda Divisione B
Sangiovannese	San Giovanni Valdarno	Stadio Virgilio Fedini	3,800	5th in Lega Pro Seconda Divisione B
Villacidrese	Villacidro	Stadio Comunale	2,000	15th in Lega Pro Seconda Divisione A

=== Girone C ===
Club	City	Stadium	Capacity	2009–10 season
Avellino	Avellino	Stadio Partenio	26,308	5th Serie D/I
Aversa Normanna	Aversa	Stadio Augusto Bisceglia	2,555	11th in Lega Pro Seconda Divisione C
Brindisi	Brindisi	Stadio Franco Fanuzzi	7,600	4th in Lega Pro Seconda Divisione C
Campobasso	Campobasso	Stadio Nuovo Romagnoli	21,800	10th in Serie D/F
Catanzaro	Catanzaro	Stadio Nicola Ceravolo	13,619	2nd in Lega Pro Seconda Divisione C
Fondi	Fondi	Stadio Domenico Purificato	2,500	1st in Serie D/G
Isola Liri	Isola del Liri	Stadio Conte A. Mangoni	3,400	14th in Lega Pro Seconda Divisione C
Latina	Latina	Stadio Domenico Francioni	8,000	9th in Serie D/G
Matera	Matera	Stadio XXI Settembre - Franco Salerno	8,500	9th in Serie D/H
Melfi	Melfi	Stadio Arturo Valerio	4,500	9th in Lega Pro Seconda Divisione C
Milazzo	Milazzo	Stadio Grotta Polifemo	2,500	1st in Serie D/I
Neapolis Mugnano	Mugnano di Napoli	Stadio Andrea Vallefuoco	2,000	1st in Serie D/H
Pomezia	Pomezia	Stadio Comunale	5,000	3rd in Serie D/G
Trapani	Trapani (playing in Erice)	Stadio Polisportivo Provinciale	7,000	2nd in Serie D/I
Vibonese	Vibo Valentia	Stadio Luigi Razza	4,500	16th in Lega Pro Seconda Divisione C
Vigor Lamezia	Lamezia Terme	Stadio Guido D'Ippolito	4,000	4th in Serie D/I

== League table ==
=== Girone A ===
Pos	Team	Pld	W	D	L	GF	GA	GD	Pts	Promotion or relegation
1	Tritium (C, P)	32	17	10	5	49	25	+24	59 (Note: Tritium, FeralpiSalò and Rodengo Saiano were docked 2 points.)	Promotion to Lega Pro Prima Divisione
2	FeralpiSalò (O, P)	32	16	11	5	36	22	+14	57	Qualification for Promotion play-off
3	Pro Vercelli (Note: Pro Vercelli promoted to Lega Pro Prima Divisione to fill the vacancies created.) (P)	32	12	16	4	36	23	+13	52 (Note: PRV 2-1 PRO ; PRO 1-1 PRV)	Qualification for Promotion play-off
4	Pro Patria	32	18	5	9	57	34	+23	52 (Note: Pro Patria was docked 7 points and will be docked 1 point in the next season.)	Qualification for Promotion play-off
5	Renate	32	13	11	8	42	28	+14	50	Qualification for Promotion play-off
6	Savona	32	13	14	5	36	26	+10	49 (Note: Savona was docked 4 points.)	
7	Lecco	32	13	8	11	32	34	−2	47	
8	Montichiari	32	9	14	9	28	28	0	41 (Note: ROD 1-1 MON ; MON 2-1 ROD)	
9	Rodengo Saiano (R)	32	11	10	11	28	29	−1	41	Excluded from professional football after does not join the championship (Note: Rodengo Saiano didn't join championship and excluded from football.)
10	Casale	32	9	10	13	25	41	−16	37	
11	Canavese (R)	32	12	8	12	33	33	0	36 (Note: Canavese was docked 8 points.)	Excluded from professional football after does not join the championship (Note: Canavese didn't join the championship and excluded from football .)
12	Sambonifacese	32	7	13	12	36	41	−5	34	
13	Valenzana	32	7	13	12	24	33	−9	33 (Note: Valenzana and Entella were docked 1 point.)	
14	Virtus Entella	32	6	14	12	30	35	−5	31	
15	Sacilese (R)	32	5	12	15	27	45	−18	27 (Note: SAN 0-1 SAC ; SAC 2-1 SAN)	Relegation to Serie D
16	Sanremese (R)	32	5	12	15	24	38	−14	27	Excluded from professional football after does not join the championship (Note: Sanremese does not appeal against the exclusion of Covisoc and excluded from football.)
17	Mezzocorona (R)	32	6	5	21	24	52	−28	23	Relegation to Serie D

Updated to match(es) played on 8 May 2011. Source: Tutto Lega Pro
Rules for classification: 1) points; 2) goal difference; 3) number of goals scored.
(C) Champions; (O) Play-off winners; (P) Promoted; (R) Relegated

=== Girone B ===
Pos	Team	Pld	W	D	L	GF	GA	GD	Pts	Promotion or relegation
1	Carpi (C, P)	30	19	8	3	45	16	+29	65	Promotion to Lega Pro Prima Divisione
2	Carrarese (O, P)	30	17	12	1	51	18	+33	63	Qualification for Promotion play-off
3	Prato (Note: Prato promoted to Lega Pro Prima Divisione to fill the vacancies created.) (P)	30	14	7	9	35	25	+10	49 (Note: PRA 3-0 LAQ ; LAQ 0-2 PRA)	Qualification for Promotion play-off
4	L'Aquila	30	15	4	11	30	27	+3	49	Qualification for Promotion play-off
5	San Marino	30	12	11	7	36	30	+6	47	Qualification for Promotion play-off
6	Chieti	30	11	13	6	37	29	+8	46	
7	Giacomense	30	9	14	7	33	27	+6	41	
8	Poggibonsi	30	11	7	12	29	40	−11	40	
9	Bellaria Igea	30	7	14	9	31	31	0	35	
10	Gavorrano	30	8	7	15	34	40	−6	31	
11	Giulianova	30	8	8	14	31	40	−9	29 (Note: Giulianova was docked 3 points.)	
12	Crociati Noceto (R)	30	5	13	12	35	48	−13	28	Relegation to Eccellenza (Note: Crociati Noceto didn't join 2011–12 championship and relegated to Eccellenza Emilia–Romagna.)
13	Celano	30	6	7	17	29	51	−22	25	
14	Sangiovannese (R)	30	9	10	11	28	35	−7	24 (Note: SAN 2-1 FANO ; FANO 0-0 SAN) (Note: Sangiovannese and Villacidrese were docked 13 points.)	Relegation to Eccellenza (Note: Sangiovannese didn't join 2011–12 championship and relegated to Eccellenza Tuscany as San Giovanni Valdarno.)
15	Fano	30	6	10	14	29	46	−17	24 (Note: Fano was docked 4 points.)	
16	Villacidrese (R)	30	7	7	16	33	43	−10	15	Relegation to Terza Categoria (Note: Villacidrese does not appeal against the exclusion of Covisod and relegated to Terza Categoria Medio Campidano)

Updated to match(es) played on 8 May 2011. Source: Tutto Lega Pro
Rules for classification: 1) points; 2) goal difference; 3) number of goals scored.
(C) Champions; (O) Play-off winners; (P) Promoted; (R) Relegated

=== Girone C ===
Pos	Team	Pld	W	D	L	GF	GA	GD	Pts	Promotion or relegation
1	Latina (C, P)	30	19	10	1	45	16	+29	67	Promotion to Lega Pro Prima Divisione
2	Trapani (O, P)	30	17	8	5	45	24	+21	58 (Note: Trapani and Matera were docked 1 point.)	Qualification for Promotion play-off
3	Milazzo	30	16	6	8	40	25	+15	54	Qualification for Promotion play-off
4	Avellino (Note: Avellino promoted to Lega Pro Prima Divisione to fill the vacancies created.) (P)	30	15	8	7	51	26	+25	53	Qualification for Promotion play-off
5	Neapolis Mugnano	30	15	7	8	35	26	+9	52	Qualification for Promotion play-off
6	Aversa Normanna	30	13	9	8	38	29	+9	48	
7	Matera (R)	30	9	10	11	28	38	−10	36 (Note: MEL 1-1 MAT ; MAT 2-1 MEL)	Relegation to Terza Categoria (Note: Matera does not appeal against the exclusion of Covisoc and relegated to Terza Categoria Matera.)
8	Melfi	30	12	6	12	48	35	+13	36 (Note: Melfi was docked 6 points.)	
9	Isola Liri	30	7	10	13	25	35	−10	31 (Note: ISL 2-3 VLA ; VLA 0-3 ISL)	
10	Vigor Lamezia	30	8	7	15	37	50	−13	31	
11	Campobasso	30	7	11	12	28	36	−8	30 (Note: CAM 1-0 FON ; FON 2-2 CAM) (Note: Campobasso and Vibonese were docked 2 points.)	
12	Fondi	30	6	12	12	37	49	−12	30	
13	Brindisi (R)	30	7	8	15	21	42	−21	24 (Note: Brindisi was docked 5 points.)	Relegation to Serie D (Note: Brindisi does not appeal against the exclusion of Covisoc and relegated to Serie D as Città di Brindisi.)
14	Vibonese	30	2	14	14	23	43	−20	18	
15	Catanzaro (Note: Catanzaro was excluded by Covisoc's decision but readmitted by TNAS.)	30	5	4	21	15	49	−34	11 (Note: Catanzaro was docked 8 points.)	
16	Pomezia (R)	30	11	12	7	31	23	+8	44 (Note: Pomezia was docked 1 point and on May 4, 2011, for false documents submitted to the repechage, was relegated to last place by the Corte di Giustizia Federale of FIGC.)	Relegation to Seconda Categoria (Note: Pomezia does not appeal against the exclusion of Covisod and relegated to Seconda Categoria Lazio.)

Updated to match(es) played on 8 May 2011. Source: Tutto Lega Pro
Rules for classification: 1) points; 2) goal difference; 3) number of goals scored.
(C) Champions; (O) Play-off winners; (P) Promoted; (R) Relegated

== Promotion Playoffs ==
=== Girone A ===
Semifinals
First legs scheduled May 22, 2011; return legs scheduled May 29, 2011

Team 1	Agg.	Team 2	1st leg	2nd leg
Renate (5)	1-2	(2) FeralpiSalò	1–1	0–1
Pro Patria (4)	5-4	(3) Pro Vercelli	5–2	0-2

Final
First leg scheduled June 5, 2011; return leg scheduled June 12, 2011

Team 1	Agg.	Team 2	1st leg	2nd leg
Pro Patria (4)	2-3	(2) FeralpiSalò	1–1	1–2

FeralpiSalò promoted to Lega Pro Prima Divisione

=== Girone B ===
Semifinals
First legs scheduled May 22, 2011; return legs scheduled May 29, 2011

Team 1	Agg.	Team 2	1st leg	2nd leg
San Marino (5)	2-2	(2) Carrarese	0–1	2–1
L'Aquila (4)	4-4	(3) Prato	3–2	1-2

Qualified to the final the teams best placed in the league table

Final
First leg scheduled June 5, 2011; return leg scheduled June 12, 2011

Team 1	Agg.	Team 2	1st leg	2nd leg
Prato (3)	1-2	(2) Carrarese	1–0	0–2

Carrarese promoted to Lega Pro Prima Divisione

=== Girone C ===
Semifinals
First legs scheduled May 22, 2011; return legs scheduled May 29, 2011

Team 1	Agg.	Team 2	1st leg	2nd leg
Neapolis Mugnano (5)	1-3	(2) Trapani	1–1	0–2
Avellino (4)	3-0	(3) Milazzo	2–0	1-0

Final
First leg scheduled June 5, 2011; return leg scheduled June 12, 2011

Team 1	Agg.	Team 2	1st leg	2nd leg
Avellino (4)	3-4	(2) Trapani	2–1	1–3(aet)

Trapani promoted to Lega Pro Prima Divisione

== Relegation Playoffs ==
Girone A

First leg scheduled May 22, 2011; return leg scheduled May 29, 2011

Team 1	Agg.	Team 2	1st leg	2nd leg
Sanremese (16)	3–2	(15) Sacilese	2–1	1-1

Sacilese relegated to Serie D

Girone B

Playoff not played.

Villacidrese relegated directly to Serie D.

Girone C

Playoff not played.

Pomezia relegated to Serie D by the Corte di Giustizia Federale of FIGC.
