= 2022–23 Serie D =

Serie D
- Season: 2022–23
- Champions: Sestri Levante (1st title)
- Promoted: Sestri Levante; Lumezzane; Legnago; Giana Erminio; Arezzo; Pineto; Sorrento; Brindisi; Catania; Casertana

The 2022–23 Serie D was the seventy-third season of the top-level Italian non-professional football championship. It represents the fourth tier in the Italian football league system.

== Rules ==
The season will provide a total of nine promotions to Serie C (those being the winners of all nine groups). Teams placed between second and fifth for each group will play a so-called "playoff tournament" starting with two one-legged games played at the best-placed team's home venue:

- 2nd-placed team vs 5th-placed team;
- 3rd-placed team vs 4th-placed team.

In case of a draw by the end of the game, two extra times will be played; in case of no winner after that, the best-placed team will advance to the final.

The two winning teams will then play a one-legged final, to be hosted at the best-placed team's home venue, with the same rules as in the first round. The nine playoff winners for each group will be prioritised to fill any potential Serie C league vacancies.

The two bottom-placed teams for each league group are automatically relegated to Eccellenza. Two two-legged relegation playoff games (known in Italian as "play-out") will therefore be played between:

- 13th-placed team vs 16th-placed team (for 18-team groups), or 15th-placed team vs 18th-placed team (for 20-team groups);
- 14th-placed team vs 15th-placed team (for 18-team groups), or 16th-placed team vs 17th-placed team (for 20-team groups).

Two extra times will be played in case of an aggregate draw after the second leg; in case of a further aggregate draw, the worst-placed team will be relegated.

In case the two teams have a league gap of at least eight points, the relegation playoff will not take place and the worst-placed team will be automatically relegated instead.

== Teams ==
The league composition involves nine divisions, grouped geographically and named alphabetically.

=== Teams relegated from Serie C ===
The following teams were relegated from the 2021–22 Serie C:

- From Group A: Seregno, Giana Erminio, Legnago;
- From Group B: Pistoiese, Grosseto;
- From Group C: Paganese, Vibonese.

Catania were instead excluded during the season; as per Article 52 of N.O.I.F., a phoenix club from Catania was therefore allowed to submit application to participate in the Serie D league.

=== Teams promoted from Eccellenza ===
The following teams were promoted from Eccellenza:

Abruzzo

- Avezzano

Basilicata

- Matera Grumentum

Apulia

- Barletta
- Martina^{[PO]}

Calabria

- Locri

Campania

- Angri^{[PO]}
- Palmese
- Puteolana

Emilia Romagna

- Corticella
- Riccione
- Salsomaggiore^{[CI]}

Friuli-Venezia Giulia

- Torviscosa

Lazio

- Lupa Frascati
- Pomezia^{[PO]}
- Tivoli

Liguria

- Fezzanese

Lombardy

- Castanese^{[PO]}
- Lumezzane
- Sant'Angelo
- Varesina

Marche

- Vigor Senigallia

Molise

- Termoli

Piedmont & Aosta Valley

- Chisola^{[PO]}
- Stresa
- Pinerolo

Sardinia

- Ilvamaddalena

Sicily

- Canicattì
- Ragusa

Trentino Alto Adige – Südtirol

- Virtus Bolzano

Tuscany

- Livorno^{[1]}
- Tau Calcio Altopascio
- Terranuova Traiana^{[PO]}

Umbria

- Orvietana

Veneto

- Montecchio Maggiore^{[PO]}
- Portogruaro
- Villafranca Veronese

^{PO} Promoted as national playoff winners. ^{CI} Promoted as Coppa Italia Dilettanti runners-up, due to tournament winners Barletta having been promoted directly to Serie D. ^{1} Livorno were readmitted to Serie D after Figline's promotion was revoked due to unsportsmanlike conduct in a promotion playoff game.

=== Relocations, mergers and renamings ===
- Cascina relocated to Ponsacco and was renamed Mobilieri Ponsacco.
- Atletico Terme Fiuggi relocated to Riano and was renamed Roma City.
- Muravera relocated to Tertenia and was renamed Sarrabus Ogliastra.
- Stresa merged with Lesa Vergante and was renamed Stresa Vergante.
- Sona changed its name to Chievo-Sona. The renaming was reverted later in September 2022.
- Athletic Carpi changed its name to Carpi.
- FYA Riccione changed its name to United Riccione.

=== Exclusions ===
In July 2022, the Serie D football committee announced Rieti and Delta Porto Tolle had not submitted its league application, whereas Lornano Badesse had renounced their right to take part to the season.

Later in August 2022, Giarre were also excluded due to unpaid salaries. Giarre's exclusion was successively suspended by the Administrative Court of Lazio, following an appeal by the club. On 8 September 2022, the Administrative Court of Lazio confirmed the Serie D committee decision about Giarre's exclusion.

== Group A ==
Pos	Team	Pld	W	D	L	GF	GA	GD	Pts	Promotion, qualification or relegation
1	Sestri Levante (C, P)	38	30	4	4	77	29	+48	94	Promotion to Serie C (Note: If two or more teams finish tied on points in the top of the league, once the tie-breaking criteria have applied, the 1st and the 2nd-placed teams play a tie-breaker, whose winner gets promotion to Serie C.)
2	Bra	38	21	11	6	59	31	+28	74	Qualification for promotion play-offs (Note: Winning play-offs doesn't grant promotion to Serie C, but a chance to get readmitted in case of vacancies.)
3	Sanremese	38	21	11	6	59	33	+26	74	Qualification for promotion play-offs
4	Vado (O)	38	19	12	7	61	40	+21	69	Qualification for promotion play-offs
5	Ligorna	38	17	15	6	50	36	+14	66	Qualification for promotion play-offs
6	Legnano	38	17	9	12	53	35	+18	60	
7	Asti	38	13	18	7	44	35	+9	57	
8	Gozzano	38	16	7	15	51	48	+3	55	
9	Borgosesia	38	14	10	14	54	54	0	52	
10	PDHAE	38	12	11	15	33	43	−10	47	
11	Castellanzese	38	11	13	14	51	55	−4	46	
12	Chieri	38	10	15	13	41	45	−4	45	
13	Fezzanese	38	11	12	15	47	58	−11	45	
14	Chisola	38	11	10	17	43	53	−10	43	
15	Pinerolo	38	8	18	12	38	44	−6	42	
16	Derthona (O)	38	9	15	14	55	62	−7	42	Qualification for relegation play-outs (Note: If the 15th-placed team finishes 9 or more points ahead of the 18th-placed team, then the relegation play-out is not played and the 18th-placed team is relegated to Eccellenza directly. If the 16th-placed team finishes 9 or more points ahead of the 17th-placed team, then the relegation play-out is not played and the 17th-placed team is relegated to Eccellenza directly.)
17	Castanese (R)	38	9	12	17	43	57	−14	39	Qualification for relegation play-outs
18	Stresa Vergante (R)	38	7	13	18	37	47	−10	34	Relegation to Eccellenza
19	Casale (R)	38	5	9	24	28	79	−51	24	Relegation to Eccellenza
20	Fossano (R)	38	1	11	26	40	80	−40	14	Relegation to Eccellenza

Updated to match(es) played on 7 May 2023. Source:
Rules for classification: (Note: 1) Points; 2) Head-to-head points; 3) Head-to-head goal difference; 4) Goal difference; 5) Goals scored; 6) Draw.)
(C) Champions; (O) Play-off winners; (P) Promoted; (R) Relegated

== Group B ==
Pos	Team	Pld	W	D	L	GF	GA	GD	Pts	Promotion, qualification or relegation
1	Lumezzane (C, P)	34	24	5	5	67	20	+47	77	Promotion to Serie C
2	Alcione (O)	34	21	8	5	67	31	+36	71	Qualification for promotion play-offs
3	Casatese	34	16	11	7	38	26	+12	59	Qualification for promotion play-offs
4	Arconatese	34	16	9	9	54	37	+17	57	Qualification for promotion play-offs
5	Desenzano	34	15	8	11	47	41	+6	53	Qualification for promotion play-offs
6	Franciacorta	34	13	11	10	44	43	+1	50	
7	Ponte San Pietro	34	11	16	7	47	38	+9	49	
8	Virtus CiseranoBergamo	34	14	6	14	42	40	+2	48	
9	Brusaporto	34	12	11	11	43	38	+5	47	
10	Varesina	34	13	7	14	47	50	−3	46	
11	Villa Valle	34	9	14	11	40	47	−7	41	
12	Real Calepina	34	7	18	9	30	33	−3	39	
13	Folgore Caratese (R)	34	10	9	15	37	46	−9	39	Qualification for relegation play-outs
14	Seregno (Note: 3 point deducted due to financial irregularities.) (O)	34	10	11	13	42	56	−14	38	Qualification for relegation play-outs
15	Breno (R)	34	10	7	17	35	50	−15	37	Qualification for relegation play-outs
16	Città di Varese (O)	34	8	9	17	30	46	−16	33	Qualification for relegation play-outs
17	Sona (R)	34	6	9	19	28	56	−28	27	Relegation to Eccellenza
18	Caronnese (R)	34	2	9	23	24	64	−40	15	Relegation to Eccellenza

Updated to match(es) played on 7 May 2023. Source:
Rules for classification:
(C) Champions; (O) Play-off winners; (P) Promoted; (R) Relegated

== Group C ==
Pos	Team	Pld	W	D	L	GF	GA	GD	Pts	Promotion, qualification or relegation
1	Legnago (C, P)	34	17	9	8	48	26	+22	60	Promotion to Serie C
2	Union Clodiense Chioggia	34	15	13	6	46	31	+15	58	Qualification for promotion play-offs
3	Adriese	34	14	14	6	54	38	+16	56	Qualification for promotion play-offs
4	Campodarsego (O)	34	14	12	8	50	40	+10	54	Qualification for promotion play-offs
5	Luparense	34	13	14	7	49	34	+15	53	Qualification for promotion play-offs
6	Virtus Bolzano	34	13	14	7	53	43	+10	53	
7	Este	34	13	11	10	47	39	+8	50	
8	Cjarlins Muzane	34	11	15	8	38	36	+2	48	
9	Caldiero Terme	34	12	12	10	42	41	+1	48	
10	Cartigliano	34	11	13	10	47	50	−3	46	
11	Mestre	34	12	7	15	46	42	+4	43	
12	Dolomiti Bellunesi	34	11	10	13	42	47	−5	43	
13	Montecchio Maggiore (O)	34	10	9	15	50	55	−5	39	Qualification for relegation play-outs (Note: If the 13th-placed team finishes 9 or more points ahead of the 16th-placed team, then the relegation play-out is not played and the 16th-placed team is relegated to Eccellenza directly. If the 14th-placed team finishes 9 or more points ahead of the 15th-placed team, then the relegation play-out is not played and the 15th-placed team is relegated to Eccellenza directly.)
14	Torviscosa (O)	34	8	12	14	31	46	−15	36	Qualification for relegation play-outs
15	Portogruaro (R)	34	9	8	17	36	56	−20	35	Qualification for relegation play-outs
16	Villafranca Veronese (R)	34	8	10	16	35	46	−11	34	Qualification for relegation play-outs
17	Montebelluna (R)	34	8	7	19	35	61	−26	31	Relegation to Eccellenza
18	Levico Terme (R)	34	5	14	15	23	41	−18	29	Relegation to Eccellenza

Updated to match(es) played on 7 May 2023. Source:
Rules for classification:
(C) Champions; (O) Play-off winners; (P) Promoted; (R) Relegated

== Group D ==
Pos	Team	Pld	W	D	L	GF	GA	GD	Pts	Promotion, qualification or relegation
1	Giana Erminio (C, P)	38	23	11	4	77	31	+46	80	Promotion to Serie C
2	Pistoiese	38	20	13	5	56	32	+24	73	Qualification for promotion play-offs
3	Carpi	38	16	11	11	58	44	+14	59	Qualification for promotion play-offs
4	Real Forte Querceta	38	15	12	11	49	41	+8	57	Qualification for promotion play-offs
5	Corticella (O)	38	17	6	15	63	62	+1	57	Qualification for promotion play-offs
6	Forlì	38	16	9	13	54	42	+12	57	
7	Ravenna	38	15	11	12	52	47	+5	56	
8	Sammaurese	38	12	15	11	49	44	+5	51	
9	Aglianese	38	12	14	12	51	46	+5	50	
10	United Riccione	38	13	11	14	50	51	−1	50	
11	Prato (Note: 3 point deducted due to financial irregularities.)	38	14	10	14	57	59	−2	49	
12	Mezzolara	38	12	13	13	43	47	−4	49	
13	Fanfulla (Note: 4 point deducted due to having fielded a disqualified player.)	38	14	10	14	48	57	−9	48	
14	Lentigione	38	11	15	12	49	52	−3	48	
15	Crema (O)	38	12	12	14	56	56	0	48	Qualification for relegation play-outs
16	Correggese (R)	38	12	12	14	41	48	−7	48	Qualification for relegation play-outs
17	Sant'Angelo (O)	38	11	12	15	45	51	−6	45	Qualification for relegation play-outs
18	Scandicci (R)	38	10	12	16	46	57	−11	42	Qualification for relegation play-outs
19	Bagnolese (R)	38	9	11	18	30	48	−18	38	Relegation to Eccellenza
20	Salsomaggiore (R)	38	1	10	27	21	80	−59	13	Relegation to Eccellenza

Updated to match(es) played on 7 May 2023. Source:
Rules for classification:
(C) Champions; (O) Play-off winners; (P) Promoted; (R) Relegated

== Group E ==
Pos	Team	Pld	W	D	L	GF	GA	GD	Pts	Promotion, qualification or relegation
1	Arezzo (C, P)	34	21	7	6	54	30	+24	70	Promotion to Serie C
2	Pianese (O)	34	18	9	7	58	42	+16	63	Qualification for promotion play-offs
3	Poggibonsi	34	17	7	10	65	43	+22	58	Qualification for promotion play-offs
4	Follonica Gavorrano	34	14	13	7	52	41	+11	55	Qualification for promotion play-offs
5	Livorno	34	12	13	9	39	35	+4	49	Qualification for promotion play-offs
6	Flaminia	34	13	10	11	47	40	+7	49	
7	Seravezza Pozzi	34	12	11	11	41	41	0	47	
8	Ghiviborgo	34	9	16	9	40	41	−1	43	
9	Tau Calcio Altopascio	34	9	15	10	41	43	−2	42	
10	Orvietana	34	10	12	12	38	42	−4	42	
11	Sangiovannese	34	9	14	11	38	37	+1	41	
12	Ostia Mare	34	10	11	13	30	34	−4	41	
13	Grosseto (O)	34	10	11	13	37	40	−3	41	Qualification for relegation play-outs
14	Mobilieri Ponsacco (O)	34	9	11	14	39	53	−14	38	Qualification for relegation play-outs
15	Trestina (R)	34	8	13	13	40	48	−8	37	Qualification for relegation play-outs
16	Terranuova Traiana (R)	34	9	8	17	31	45	−14	35	Qualification for relegation play-outs
17	Montespaccato (R)	34	7	12	15	30	45	−15	33	Relegation to Eccellenza
18	Città di Castello (R)	34	7	11	16	32	52	−20	32	Relegation to Eccellenza

Updated to match(es) played on unknown. Source:
Rules for classification:
(C) Champions; (O) Play-off winners; (P) Promoted; (R) Relegated

== Group F ==
Pos	Team	Pld	W	D	L	GF	GA	GD	Pts	Promotion, qualification or relegation
1	Pineto (C, P)	34	21	9	4	50	21	+29	72	Promotion to Serie C
2	Vigor Senigallia	34	20	7	7	52	34	+18	67	Qualification for promotion play-offs
3	Trastevere	34	18	8	8	56	41	+15	62	Qualification for promotion play-offs
4	Fano (O)	34	18	6	10	45	34	+11	60	Qualification for promotion play-offs
5	Cynthialbalonga	34	13	13	8	32	23	+9	52	Qualification for promotion play-offs
6	Matese	34	12	11	11	44	38	+6	47	
7	Sambenedettese (Note: 1 point deducted due to financial irregularities.)	34	13	8	13	39	37	+2	46	
8	Chieti	34	12	10	12	29	27	+2	46	
9	Porto d'Ascoli	34	10	15	9	28	27	+1	45	
10	Vastogirardi (Note: 1 point deducted due to unpaid salaries.)	34	10	13	11	30	31	−1	42	
11	Team Nuova Florida	34	11	9	14	33	44	−11	42	
12	Avezzano	34	11	7	16	35	41	−6	40	
13	Roma City (R)	34	9	10	15	29	42	−13	37	Qualification for relegation play-outs
14	Vastese (R)	34	8	12	14	37	43	−6	36	Qualification for relegation play-outs
15	Termoli (O)	34	5	19	10	25	34	−9	34	Qualification for relegation play-outs
16	San Nicolò Notaresco (O)	34	6	13	15	23	41	−18	31	Qualification for relegation play-outs
17	Montegiorgio (R)	34	7	10	17	21	34	−13	31	Relegation to Eccellenza
18	Tolentino (R)	34	7	10	17	25	41	−16	31	Relegation to Eccellenza

Updated to match(es) played on 7 May 2023. Source:
Rules for classification:
(C) Champions; (O) Play-off winners; (P) Promoted; (R) Relegated

== Group G ==
Pos	Team	Pld	W	D	L	GF	GA	GD	Pts	Promotion, qualification or relegation
1	Sorrento (C, P)	34	21	7	6	52	28	+24	70	Promotion to Serie C
2	Paganese	34	19	11	4	56	29	+27	68	Qualification for promotion play-offs
3	Casertana (O)	34	17	7	10	57	40	+17	58	Qualification for promotion play-offs
4	Arzachena	34	17	6	11	51	40	+11	57	Qualification for promotion play-offs
5	Lupa Frascati	34	13	11	10	44	29	+15	50	Qualification for promotion play-offs
6	Palmese	34	13	10	11	50	44	+6	49	
7	Cassino	34	13	8	13	42	45	−3	47	
8	Real Monterotondo Scalo	34	12	9	13	51	55	−4	45	
9	Sarrabus Ogliastra	34	12	7	15	51	54	−3	43	
10	Tivoli	34	10	11	13	36	39	−3	41	
11	Vis Artena	34	9	14	11	24	28	−4	41	
12	Portici	34	9	13	12	45	49	−4	40	
13	Angri (O)	34	10	9	15	39	50	−11	39	Qualification for relegation play-outs
14	Atletico Uri (O)	34	10	9	15	45	62	−17	39	Qualification for relegation play-outs
15	Ilvamaddalena (R)	34	8	14	12	30	39	−9	38	Qualification for relegation play-outs
16	Pomezia (R)	34	8	11	15	40	58	−18	35	Qualification for relegation play-outs
17	Nola (R)	34	8	11	15	44	55	−11	35	Relegation to Eccellenza
18	Aprilia (R)	34	8	10	16	34	47	−13	34	Relegation to Eccellenza

Updated to match(es) played on 7 May 2023. Source:
Rules for classification:
(C) Champions; (O) Play-off winners; (P) Promoted; (R) Relegated

== Group H ==
Pos	Team	Pld	W	D	L	GF	GA	GD	Pts	Promotion, qualification or relegation
1	Brindisi (C, P)	34	20	9	5	59	27	+32	69	Promotion to Serie C
2	Cavese	34	20	9	5	66	35	+31	69	Qualification for promotion play-offs
3	Nardò (O)	34	18	11	5	51	26	+25	65	Qualification for promotion play-offs
4	Barletta	34	17	13	4	42	29	+13	64	Qualification for promotion play-offs
5	Casarano	34	13	18	3	46	32	+14	57	Qualification for promotion play-offs
6	Team Altamura	34	15	11	8	51	37	+14	56	
7	Matera	34	13	11	10	53	46	+7	50	
8	Martina	34	11	12	11	40	43	−3	45	
9	Fasano	34	11	11	12	43	43	0	44	
10	Bitonto	34	11	10	13	45	51	−6	43	
11	Afragolese	34	8	15	11	41	45	−4	39	
12	Gladiator	34	8	13	13	42	55	−13	37	
13	Nocerina (O)	34	9	9	16	40	51	−11	36	Qualification for relegation play-outs
14	Gravina (O)	34	7	15	12	29	41	−12	36	Qualification for relegation play-outs
15	Molfetta (R)	34	7	11	16	40	50	−10	32	Qualification for relegation play-outs
16	Francavilla (R)	34	7	9	18	38	51	−13	30	Qualification for relegation play-outs
17	Lavello (R)	34	7	5	22	31	68	−37	26	Relegation to Eccellenza
18	Puteolana (R)	34	3	10	21	32	59	−27	19	Relegation to Eccellenza

Updated to match(es) played on 7 May 2023. Source:
Rules for classification:
(C) Champions; (O) Play-off winners; (P) Promoted; (R) Relegated

== Group I ==
Pos	Team	Pld	W	D	L	GF	GA	GD	Pts	Promotion, qualification or relegation
1	Catania (C, P)	34	28	4	2	74	20	+54	88	Promotion to Serie C
2	Locri	34	16	9	9	56	41	+15	57	Qualification for promotion play-offs
3	Trapani (O)	34	13	15	6	46	31	+15	54	Qualification for promotion play-offs
4	Lamezia Terme	34	15	9	10	45	35	+10	54	Qualification for promotion play-offs
5	Città di Sant'Agata	34	15	7	12	61	45	+16	52	Qualification for promotion play-offs
6	Licata	34	14	10	10	43	35	+8	52	
7	Sancataldese	34	14	10	10	34	30	+4	52	
8	Vibonese	34	13	8	13	40	41	−1	47	
9	Santa Maria Cilento	34	11	12	11	45	48	−3	45	
10	Canicattì	34	12	9	13	35	40	−5	45	
11	Acireale	34	10	11	13	31	30	+1	41	
12	Castrovillari	34	10	11	13	30	42	−12	41	
13	Ragusa (O)	34	8	13	13	31	47	−16	37	Qualification for relegation play-outs
14	San Luca (O)	34	7	16	11	34	46	−12	37	Qualification for relegation play-outs
15	Paternò (R)	34	10	7	17	27	47	−20	37	Qualification for relegation play-outs
16	Real Agro Aversa (Note: 2 point deducted due to financial irregularities.) (R)	34	9	11	14	29	31	−2	36	Qualification for relegation play-outs
17	Cittanova (R)	34	5	12	17	23	45	−22	27	Relegation to Eccellenza
18	Mariglianese (R)	34	6	6	22	24	54	−30	24	Relegation to Eccellenza

Updated to match(es) played on 7 May 2023. Source:
Rules for classification:
(C) Champions; (O) Play-off winners; (P) Promoted; (R) Relegated

== Post-season ==
=== Promotion play-offs ===
The following teams played a one-legged match in Vibo Valentia on 14 May 2023, as they ended the season with level points in first place. The winning team was automatically promoted to Serie C, whereas the losing side would play in the playoff tournament instead.

Team 1	Score	Team 2
Brindisi	3–1	Cavese

=== Relegation play-outs ===
The following teams played a one-legged match in a neutral field on 14 May 2023 as they ended the season with level points in third-to-bottom place. The losing team was directly relegated to Serie D, whereas the winning side would take part in the actual relegation play-out tournament for their respective group.

Team 1	Score	Team 2
Montegiorgio	1–2 (aet)	San Nicolò Notaresco
Nola	0–1	Pomezia

The relegation playout games took place on 14 and 21 May 2023 and were hosted by the best-placed team in the regular season. In case of a tie after extra time, the best-placed team would escape relegation.

Team 1	Score	Team 2
Derthona	1–0	Castanese
Folgore Caratese	0–3^{[REL]}	Città di Varese
Seregno	0–0 (aet)	Breno
Montecchio Maggiore	5–0	Villafranca Veronese
Torviscosa	0–0 (aet)	Portogruaro
Crema	0–0 (aet)	Scandicci
Correggese	1–2	Sant'Angelo
Grosseto	0–0 (aet)	Terranuova Traiana
Mobilieri Ponsacco	2–1	Trestina
Vastese	1–2	Termoli
Roma City	2–3 (aet)	San Nicolò Notaresco
Atletico Uri	2–2 (aet)	Ilvamaddalena
Angri	3–0	Pomezia
Nocerina	2–1	Francavilla
Gravina	3–1	Molfetta
Ragusa	6–0	Real Agro Aversa
San Luca	2–0	Paternò

^{REL} Città di Varese were awarded a 3–0 win due to irregular pitch; the game had originally ended in a 2–0 win for Folgore Caratese.

== Poule Scudetto ==
=== Group 1 ===
Pos	Team	Pld	W	D	L	GF	GA	GD	Pts
1	Sestri Levante	2	2	0	0	5	2	+3	6
2	Lumezzane (Note: Lumezzane qualified for final stage as best 2nd-placed team.)	2	1	0	1	4	3	+1	3
3	Legnago	2	0	0	2	2	6	−4	0

Source: Soccerway (in English)
Notes:

Team 1	Score	Team 2
Lumezzane	3–0	Sestri Levante
Legnago	1–3	Lumezzane
Sestri Levante	3–1	Legnago

=== Group 2 ===
Pos	Team	Pld	W	D	L	GF	GA	GD	Pts
1	Pineto	2	1	0	1	4	3	+1	3 (Note: Pineto finished ahead of Arezzo and Giana Erminio on goal difference : Pineto = +1, Arezzo = 0, Giana Erminio = -1)
2	Arezzo	2	1	0	1	4	4	0	3
3	Giana Erminio	2	1	0	1	3	4	−1	3

Source: Soccerway (in English)
Notes:

Team 1	Score	Team 2
Arezzo	3–0	Giana Erminio
Giana Erminio	2–1	Pineto
Pineto	3–1	Arezzo

=== Group 3 ===
Pos	Team	Pld	W	D	L	GF	GA	GD	Pts
1	Sorrento	2	2	0	0	5	0	+5	6
2	Catania	2	1	0	1	2	3	−1	3
3	Brindisi	2	0	0	2	1	5	−4	0

Source: Soccerway (in English)

Team 1	Score	Team 2
Catania	0–1	Sorrento
Brindisi	1–2	Catania
Sorrento	3–0	Brindisi

=== Final stage ===
Semi-finals
Lumezzane	2	0	2
Sorrento	1	2	3
Sestri Levante	0	0	2
Pineto	0	0	0

Finals
Sorrento	1
Sestri Levante	3
