= Fabrizio Di Bella =

Italian footballer (born 1988)

Personal information
- Date of birth: 2 March 1988 (age 38)
- Place of birth: Rome, Italy
- Height: 1.88 m (6 ft 2 in)
- Position: Defender

Team information
- Current team: Vigor Lamezia

Youth career
- 2005–2006: Lazio

Senior career*
Years	Team	Apps	(Gls)
2006–2007	Guidonia	4	(0)
2007	Astrea	14	(1)
2007–2009	Potenza	43	(1)
2009–2012	Livorno	4	(0)
2009	→ Pergocrema (loan)	16	(0)
2010	→ Valle del Giovenco (loan)	5	(0)
2011–2012	→ Piacenza (loan)	8	(0)
2012– 2014	Barletta		
2014–	Vigor Lamezia		
- * Club domestic league appearances and goals as of 07:21, 24 January 2012 (UTC)

Fabrizio Di Bella (born 2 March 1988) is an Italian footballer who plays as a defender for Vigor Lamezia, an Italian team of Lamezia Terme.

== Career ==
Di Bella was signed by A.S. Livorno Calcio in August 2008; he was loaned back to Potenza for a season.

He made his Livorno debut on 18 September 2010, in a 0–0 draw at home to Portogruaro.

In 2012, he joined Barletta. Although the deal was initially announced as a temporary deal, Livorno announced in their financial report that the club wrote down the residual value of Di Bella's contract (which lasted until c. 30 June 2013) for €103,000. In July 2013 Barletta announced that Di Bella would remain with the club for another season.
