= Massimo Cicconi =

Italian footballer

Personal information
- Date of birth: 9 August 1969 (age 57)
- Place of birth: Teramo, Italy
- Height: 1.77 m (5 ft 10 in)
- Position: Forward

Youth career
- Como

Senior career*
Years	Team	Apps	(Gls)
1987–1988	Como	2	(0)
1988	SPAL	5	(0)
1988–1989	Pavia	23	(5)
1989–1990	Pergocrema	34	(10)
1990–1991	Como	14	(2)
1991–1992	Novara	23	(4)
1992–1993	Como	1	(0)
1993	Palermo	5	(0)
1993–1994	SPAL	11	(3)
1994	Palermo	6	(0)
1994–1995	Siracusa	18	(4)
1995–1996	Casarano	23	(5)
1996–1998	Gualdo	64	(19)
1998–1999	Pescara	19	(0)
1999–2000	Giulianova	25	(7)
2000–2003	Catania	68	(17)
2003–2004	Fiorentina	13	(3)
2004	Grosseto	12	(0)
2004–2005	Morro d'Oro	22	(3)
2005–2006	Como	14	(4)
2006–2008	Corsico		
2008–2009	Naviglio Trezzano		
Total		402	(86)

Managerial career
- 2011–2013: Atalanta (youth)
- 2014–: Como (youth)
- * Club domestic league appearances and goals

Massimo Cicconi (born 9 August 1969) is an Italian former professional footballer who played as a forward.

== Career ==
Cicconi was revealed in the youth sectors of Como, a team that accumulated four spells during his career. He played for several teams in Serie B, Serie C1 and Serie C2, with emphasis on Fiorentina Viola and Grosseto, when he was champion in succession in the 2002–03 and 2003–04 seasons.

Cicconi is currently coach of Como's youth teams.

== Honours ==
=== Player ===
Fiorentina

- Serie C2: 2002–03 (group B)

Grosseto

- Serie C2: 2003–04 (group B)

=== Manager ===
Como (youth)

- Campionato Nazionale Under-17 Serie C: 2016–17, 2020–21
