= Paolo Rodolfi =

Italian football manager

Personal information
- Date of birth: 23 June 1959 (age 67)
- Place of birth: Parma, Italy

Team information
- Current team: Albania (assistant coach)

Managerial career
- Years: Team
- Reggiana youths
- Hellas Verona youths
- Parma youths
- Nuorese
- Sanremese
- 2008–2009: Valenzana Mado
- 2009–2010: Melfi
- 2010–2011: Rodengo Saiano
- 2011–2012: Melfi
- 2012: Casale
- 2016: Ternana (assistant)
- 2017–: Albania (assistant)

Paolo Rodolfi (born 23 June 1959) is an Italian football manager, who works as an assistant coach at Albania national team, under head coach Christian Panucci.

== Career ==
Rodolfi starter his coaching career with youths of Reggiana. He became then head coach of youths of Hellas Verona and Parma. He became part of Cesare Prandelli staff at Italy national football team in Technical Commissioner role. He became head coach of a senior team for the first time with Nuorese, managing also Sanremese later. In the 2008–09 season he was head coach of Valenzana Mado. In the 2009–10 season he was head coach of Melfi. In the 2010–11 season he was head coach of Rodengo Saiano. He was returned to Melfi for the 2011–12 season working until March 2012. In July 2012 he became head coach of Casale working until November 2012. In 2013 he qualified for the UEFA Pro Licence. He was returned in 2016 to work at Ternana as an assistant manager under Christian Panucci. On 24 July 2017 he was named as Albania national football team assistant manager under coach Christian Panucci, with whom he had previously also worked during their time together at Ternana.
