= ASD Pianura =

Italian football club

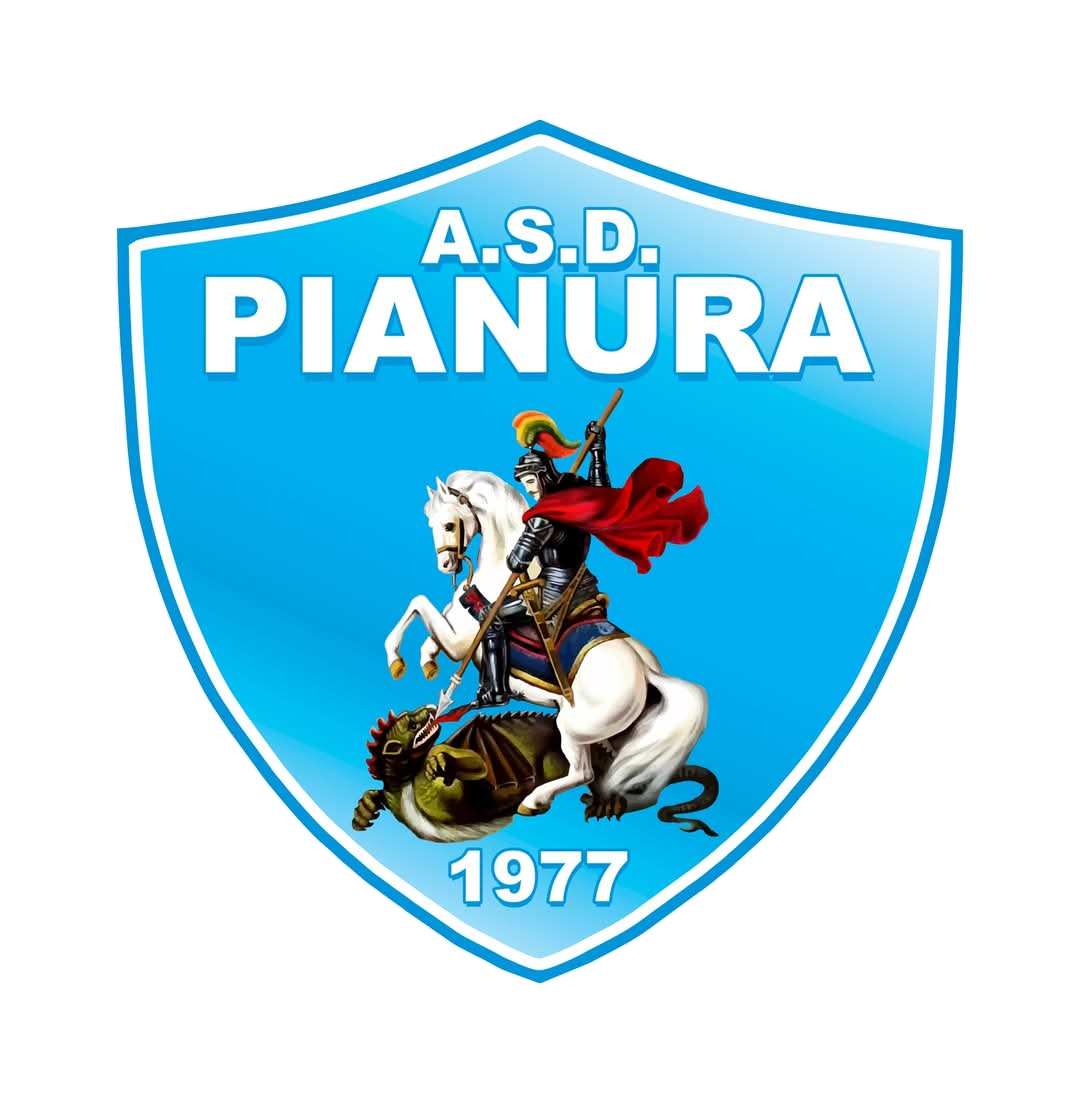
- Full name: Associazione Sportiva Pianura
- Nicknames: Bianco Azzurri (The White and Blues)
- Founded: 1977
- Dissolved: 2010 and 2025
- Ground: Stadio Simpatia, Pianura, Naples, Italy
- Capacity: 3,000
- Chairman: Lino Cafasso
- Manager: Luigi Sorianello
- League: Promozione
- 2007/2008: Eccellenza, 1st
Home colours	Away colours

Associazione Sportiva Dilettantistica Pianura is an Italian association football club located in Pianura, Naples, Campania. The team colors are white and blue.

The team's most prestigious victory took place on 20 June 2010, when Pianura defeated Carpi 8–2 in the playoff semifinal of Serie D after the bad defeat in Emilia Romagna (5–0). Under a torrential rain, Gargiulo's boys beat Carpi and went to the final against Matera. Eventually, in the final, Pianura lost 1–0 at the last minute, and the club was dismissed by its owners, the Cafasso brothers, due to a lack of a stadium.

The team was reborn in the 2015–2016 season, starting again from Terza Categoria. (8th division and last division in the italian football)

In the 2020–2021 season, Pianura Calcio lost the playoffs to reach Serie D against Ischia Calcio in the quarter finals.

In the 2023-2024 season they finished 1st in Prima Categoria Campania with 69 points

In the 2024-2025 season Pianura Calcio played in Promozione Campania Group B finishing 14th and defeating Puteolana 1909 2-1 in the playout to remain in Promozione. (6th division)

In early June 2025, the club transferred its title to the Ciro Caruso Football Academy.
