= AC Montichiari =

Italian football club

Montichiari
- Full name: A.C. Montichiari
- Founded: 1928
- Dissolved: 2012
- Ground: Stadio Romeo Menti, Montichiari, Italy

Associazione Calcio Montichiari was an Italian association football club based in based in Montichiari, Lombardy.

The last owner and president were respectively Francesco De Pasquale and Maurizio Soloni.

In 2012 Carpenedolo from the nearby town, relocated its sports title to Montichiari as a spiritual successor, namely F.C. Atletico Montichiari.

== History ==
=== A.C. Montichiari ===
The club was founded in 1928.

==== From 2006-07 to 2008-09 ====
In the 2006–07 Serie C2 season, Montichiari finished 16th and was forced to play in the relegation playoffs. The team was relegated to Serie D, being the lower classified team after the two-legged tie with 15th-placed Portogruaro ended in a 1–1 aggregate draw.

In the 2007–08 Serie D season, Montichiari finished 2nd in Girone D, qualifying for the promotion playoffs. As a playoff semi-finalist, the team won special promotion to Serie C2, now called Lega Pro Seconda Divisione, as one of the 5 top teams in the promotional playoffs.

In the 2008–09 Lega Pro Seconda Divisione was relegated again in Serie D.

==== Scudetto Dilettanti 2009-10 ====
The team back now in Lega Pro Seconda Divisione winning the 2009–10 Serie D group C, conquering also the Scudetto Dilettanti.

==== From 2010-11 to 2011-12 in Lega Pro Seconda Divisione ====
In the season 2010-11 the club was ranked 8th.

In the 2011–12 season the club was ranked 18th and so relegated to Serie D.

==== The dissolution ====
In summer 2012 it does not join in Serie D and was excluded from all the Italian football.

=== Colors and badge ===
The team's colors were red and blue.

=== Honours ===
- Serie D:
  - Winners 1: 2009–10
- Scudetto Dilettanti:
  - Winners 1: 2009–10

=== Stadium ===
It played at the Stadio Romeo Menti in Montichiari, which has a capacity of 2,500.

=== Famous players ===
- (Italy) Francesco Carbone

== The football in Montichiari now ==
=== F.C. Atletico Montichiari ===
Currently the main team of the town of Montichiari is Atletico Montichiari, the former Carpenedolo, that in summer 2012 moved in this city and changed its name in the current one.
