= AC Cuneo 1905 =

Italian football club

Cuneo
- Full name: Associazione Calcio Cuneo 1905 Olmo
- Nickname: Aquile (Eagles)
- Founded: 1905; 121 years ago as, Unione Sportiva Alta Italia; 1927; 99 years ago as, Polisportiva La Fedelissima Cuneese; 1930; 96 years ago as, Gruppo Sportivo Dopolavoro Cuneo Sportiva (refounded); 1938; 88 years ago as, Associazione Calcio Cuneo; 1980; 46 years ago as, Cuneo Calcio '80 (merged); 1989; 37 years ago as, Cuneo Sportiva; 1998; 28 years ago as, Associazione Calcio Cuneo 1905; 2021; 5 years ago as, Associazione Calcio Cuneo 1905 Olmo (merged)
- Ground: Stadio Fratelli Paschiero, Cuneo, Italy
- Capacity: 4,000
- Chairman: Flavio Borgna
- Manager: Michele Magliano
- League: Eccellenza Piedmont-Aosta Valley
- 2018–19: Serie C/A, 18th (disbanded)
- Website: www.olmo84.com
Home colours	Away colours

Associazione Calcio Cuneo 1905 Olmo was an Italian football club, based in Cuneo, Piedmont. It plays in the Eccellenza Piedmont-Aosta Valley.

== History ==
The club was founded in 1905 as Unione Sportiva Alta Italia, taking its current name in 1998. It has played in Serie C from 1938 to 1943 and from 1946 to 1948. It has played in Serie B in the season 1945–46 as Cuneo Sportiva. It has played in Serie C2 from 1989 to 1992 as Cuneo Sportiva, from 2005 to 2008 and in Lega Pro Seconda Divisione in the season 2011–12.

=== Scudetto Dilettanti 2010-11 ===
Cuneo in the season 2010–11, from Serie D group A was promoted to Lega Pro Seconda Divisione, conquering also the Scudetto Dilettanti.

=== Lega Pro (2011–14) ===
In the season 2011-12 of Lega Pro Seconda Divisione the club was promoted to Lega Pro Prima Divisione after 64 years, beating Virtus Entella 5–2 in the final return of the play-off after the 1–1 of the first round. The club relegated back to Seconda Divisione in 2013 and Serie D in 2014.

== Honours ==
- Serie D:
  - Winners (3): 2010–11, 2014–15, 2016–17
- Scudetto Dilettanti:
  - Winners (1): 2010–11
