= AC Rodengo Saiano =

Italian football club

A.C. Rodengo Saiano
- Full name: Associazione Calcio Rodengo Saiano Srl
- Nickname: Franciacortini (Franciacorta)
- Founded: 1983
- Dissolved: 2011
- Ground: Stadio Polisportivo Comunale, Rodengo-Saiano, Italy
- Capacity: 2,500
- 2010–11: Lega Pro Seconda Divisione A, 8th
Home colours	Away colours

Old club crest, used until 2009

Associazione Calcio Rodengo Saiano was an Italian association football club located in Rodengo-Saiano, (BS), Lombardy Italy.

Their colors were yellow and blue.

== History ==
The club was founded in 1983.

=== Four years in Lega Pro Seconda Divisione ===
In the Serie D 2006-07 season, Rodengo finished first in Girone D, thus winning promotion for the first time ever to Serie C2, the fourth tier of Italian football. It participated in the Scudetto Dilettanti tournament but was eliminated in the group stage.

In the Serie C2 2007-08 regular season, Rodengo finished a surprising third in Girone A, and qualified for the promotional playoffs. The team was defeated by fourth-placed Lumezzane in the semi-finals, 2–1 on aggregate, thus remaining in the, now called, Lega Pro Seconda Divisione for the 2008–09 season.

Also in the 2008–09 Lega Pro Seconda Divisione Rodengo finishing fourth in Girone A, is qualified for the promotional playoffs. The team was eliminated by third-placed Lumezzane in the semi-finals, 1–1 on aggregate, for the worst placement in the league, thus remaining in the, now called, Lega Pro Seconda Divisione for the 2009–10 season.

Instead in the 2009–10 Lega Pro Seconda Divisione Rodengo finishing only seventh in Girone A and eighth in the 2010–11 season.

=== The liquidation ===
It didn't join 2011–12 Lega Pro Seconda Divisione and excluded from all football.
