= Tritium Calcio 1908 =

Italian football club

Tritium
- Full name: Tritium Calcio 1908
- Nicknames: I Trezzesi; I Biancoazzurri (The White & Light Blues); Gli Abduani (Those of the Adda River)
- Founded: 1908
- Ground: Stadio Comunale La Rocca, Trezzo sull'Adda, Italy
- Capacity: 1,075
- Chairman: Enrico Ortelli
- Manager: Matteo Serafini
- League: Serie D
- 2023–24: Serie D/B, 19th (relegated)
Home colours	Away colours

Tritium Calcio 1908 is an Italian association football club located in Trezzo sull'Adda, Lombardy, currently playing in Serie D.

The noun Tritium comes from the Latin name of the city in which it took the life activities of the club.

== History ==
The club was born in 1908 as Società Ginnastica Tritium with sections for all kinds of sports. The main activities were cyclistic journeys and football was played locally. Soon after the end of World War I their home ground was enlarged to allow meeting the Italian F.I.G.C. standards but up to 1927 main matches were against local amateurs. In 1925 the club changed name to Società Sportiva and later to Fascio Giovanile di Combattimento and Associazione Sportiva Trezzo, due to the fascist influence up to 1945.

The football team always took part to regional amateur championships excepting two times when it was promoted to national amateur league (Serie D) in 1976 and 2005.

In the season 2010–11 from Lega Pro Seconda Divisione it was promoted to Lega Pro Prima Divisione with the head coach Stefano Vecchi.

In summer 2010 after the promotion to Lega Pro Seconda Divisione it changed its name to Tritium Calcio 1908. In the next season it was promoted to Lega Pro Prima Divisione.

At the end of the 2012–13 Lega Pro Prima Divisione season the club despite the conquest of salvation after play-off, didn't enroll in the 2013–14 Lega Pro Prima Divisione league, restarting from Promozione. At the end of the 2013–14 Promozione season the club did not enroll in the 2014–15 Promozione league and dead.

From 2014 to 2016 Tritium was only active as a youth team. The club resumed its activity in 2016, starting from Prima Categoria and winning three consecutive promotions to reach Serie D already in 2019.

== Colors and badge ==
Its colors are white and blue.

== Chronology ==
Cronistoria della Tritium C. 1908

- 1908 – Founded as Società Ginnastica Tritium
- 1919–20 – Various local tournaments
- 1920–21 – Various local tournaments
- 1921–22 – Various local tournaments
- 1922–23 – Various local tournaments
- 1923–24 – Won youth tournament Targa della Vittoria
- 1924–25 – Torneo della Canicola
- 1925–26 – Campionato Libero Brianteo
- 1926–27 – Various local youth tournaments
- 1927–28 – 7th in Division 3
- 1928–29 – 5th in Division 3
- 1929–30 – 7th in Division 3
- 1930–31 – 8th in Division 3
- 1931–32 – 8th in Division 3
- 1932–33 – Inactive
- 1934 – Rebuilt as F.G.C. Trezzo
- 1934–35 – 3rd in Division 3
- 1935–36 – 2nd in Division 2 – opted for A.S. Trezzo denomination
- 1936–37 – 4th in Division 2 – elected to Div. 1
- 1937–38 – 6th in Division 1 – applied relegation to Div. 2
- 1938–39 – 2nd in Division 2
- 1939–40 – 4th in Division 2
- 1940–41 – 3rd in Division 2
- 1941–42 – 4th in Division 2
- 1942–43 – 1st in Division 2 – promoted to Div. 1
- 1943–44 – Inactive
- 1944–45 – 3rd in the local war tournament group G – back to S.S. Tritium denomination
- 1945–46 – 5th in Division 1
- 1946–47 – 4th in Division 1
- 1947–48 – 5th in Division 1
- 1948–49 – 14th in Division 1 – relegated to Div. 2
- 1949–50 – Inactive
- 1950–51 – Local tournaments
- 1951–52 – 10th in Division 2
- 1952–53 – 4th in Division 2 – promoted to Div. 1
- 1953–54 – 2nd in Division 1 – promoted to Promozione
- 1954–55 – 7th in Promozione
- 1955–56 – 5th in the National Amateur League Champ.
- 1956–57 – 4th in the National Amateur League Champ.
- 1957–58 – 3rd in the National Amateur League Champ.
- 1958–59 – 14th in the National Amateur League Champ.
- 1959–60 – 13th in 1st Category
- 1960–61 – 12th in 1st Category
- 1961–62 – 15th in 1st Category – relegated to 2nd Cat.
- 1962–63 – 7th in 2nd Category
- 1963–64 – 11th in 2nd Category
- 1964–65 – 9th in 2nd Category
- 1965–66 – 10th in 2nd Category
- 1966–67 – 1st in 2nd Category – promoted to 1st Cat.
- 1967–68 – 7th in 1st Category
- 1968–69 – 11th in 1st Category
- 1969–70 – 5th in 1st Category
- 1970–71 – 3rd in 1st Category
  Won Lombardy Cup
- 1971–72 – 8th in 1st Category
- 1972–73 – 6th in 1st Category
- 1973–74 – 1st in 1st Category – promoted to Promozione
- 1974–75 – 3rd in Promozione
- 1975–76 – 1st in Promozione – promoted to Serie D
- 1976–77 – 8th in Serie D
- 1977–78 – 7th in Serie D
- 1978–79 – 15th in Serie D – relegated to Promozione
- 1979–80 – 6th in Promozione
- 1980–81 – 5th in Promozione
- 1981–82 – 7th in Promozione
- 1982–83 – 7th in Promozione
- 1983–84 – 11th in Promozione
- 1984–85 – 4th in Promozione
- 1985–86 – 4th in Promozione
- 1986–87 – 8th in Promozione
- 1987–88 – 10th in Promozione
- 1988–89 – 14th in Promozione – relegated to 1st Cat.
- 1989–90 – 1st in 1st Category – promoted to Promozione
- 1990–91 – 1st in Promozione – promoted to Eccellenza
- 1991–92 – 9th in Eccellenza
- 1992–93 – 3rd in Eccellenza
- 1993–94 – 6th in Eccellenza
- 1994–95 – 4th in Eccellenza
- 1995–96 – 6th in Eccellenza
- 1996–97 – 14th in Eccellenza – relegated to Promozione
- 1997–98 – 9th in Promozione
- 1998–99 – 3rd in Promozione
- 1999–00 – 7th in Promozione
- 2000–01 – 4th in Promozione
- 2001–02 – 12th in Promozione
- 2002–03 – 1st in Promozione – promoted to Eccellenza
- 2003–04 – 7th in Eccellenza
- 2004–05 – 2nd in Eccellenza – promoted to Serie D
- 2005–06 – 3rd in serie D, group B. Eliminated in the playoff's national final phase. Eliminated in Coppa Italia serie D.
- 2006–07 – 7th in serie D, group B. Eliminated in Coppa Italia serie D.
- 2007–08 – 2nd in serie D, group B.
- 2008–09 – 6th in serie D, group B.
- 2009–10 – 1st in serie D, group B. Promoted to Lega Pro Seconda Divisione. Changed its name to Tritium Calcio 1908.
- 2010–11 – 1st in Lega Pro Seconda Divisione, group A. Promoted to Lega Pro Prima Divisione.
- 2011–12 – 12th in Lega Pro Prima Divisione group A.
- 2012–13 – 16th in Lega Pro Prima Divisione group A.
- 2012–13 – 5th in Promozione Lombardy group B.
