= ACD Guidonia =

Italian football club

- Full name: Associazione Calcio Dilettantistica Guidonia
- Founded: 1954
- Ground: Stadio Comunale, Guidonia Montecelio, Italy
- Capacity: 2,000
- League: Prima Categoria Lazio/D
- 2023–24: Prima Categoria Lazio/B, 4th
Home colours	Away colours

Associazione Calcio Dilettantistica Guidonia is an Italian association football club located in Guidonia Montecelio, Lazio.

The club currently plays in Prima Categoria and used to be the main club in the city, playing up to Serie D in the 2010s.

Its colors are yellow and red.
