= Morro d'Oro Calcio =

Italian football club

Morro d'Oro
- Full name: Morro d'Oro Calcio SrL
- Founded: 1976
- Ground: Stadio Comunale; Morro d'Oro, Italy
- Capacity: 1,000
- Chairman: Aurelio Malvone
- Manager: Enrico Piccioni
- League: Serie D/F
- 2009–10: Serie D/F, 15th
Home colours	Away colours

Morro d'Oro Calcio is an Italian association football club based in Morro d'Oro, Abruzzo. They currently play in Prima Categoria. Their official colors are white and red.
