= Crociati Noceto =

Italian football club

- Full name: Crociati Noceto Società Sportiva Dilettantistica S.r.l.
- Founded: 1992; 2007
- Dissolved: 2016
- Ground: Stadio Il Noce, Noceto, Italy
- Capacity: 1,641
Home colours	Away colours

Crociati Noceto S.S.D. (formerly known as Crociati Parma) was an Italian association football club located in Noceto, Emilia-Romagna.

== History ==
=== The foundation ===
In the 2006–07 season, the former Crociati Parma has played in Girone A of Eccellenza Emilia-Romagna, where it placed first, winning direct promotion to Serie D. In summer 2007 the team has absorbed A.C.Noceto and it has changed its name in Crociati Noceto.

=== From Serie D to Lega Pro Seconda Divisione ===
In the Serie D 2007–08 season, was ranked at 10th place in Girone D. However, a year later, in the Serie D 2008–09 season, the team won the same division, obtaining so the direct promotion to Lega Pro Seconda Divisione.

=== The season 2011–12 in Eccellenza ===
The club didn't join 2011–12 league in Lega Pro Seconda Divisione and it was relegated to Eccellenza Emilia–Romagna group A.

In 2016 the club folded.

== Colors and badge ==
Its colors are blue and yellow.
