= SSD Pomezia Calcio =

Italian football club

Pomezia
- Full name: Società Sportiva Dilettantistica; Pomezia Calcio
- Founded: 1957; 2014 (refounded)
- Ground: Stadio Comunale, Pomezia, Italy
- Capacity: 2,500
- Chairman: Alessio Bizzaglia
- Manager: Carlo Baylon
- League: Eccellenza
- 2021–22: Eccellenza Lazio A, 1st (promoted after national play-off)
Home colours

S.S.D. Pomezia Calcio is an Italian football club based in Pomezia, Lazio, currently playing in Eccellenza.

== History ==
=== The foundation ===
The club was formed in 1957 from the merger between A.S. Pomezia (1949) and Virtus Pomezia (1956).

=== The season 2010–11 in Lega Pro Seconda Divisione ===
==== Relegated for Judgement sporting to Serie D ====
Pomezia Calcio played in Lega Pro Seconda Divisione for the first time in the 2010–11 season after placing third in Serie D 2009–10 and was rescued. This was the second consecutive promotion. But on 4 May 2011, for false documents submitted to the repechage, Pomezia Calcio was relegated by the Corte di Giustizia Federale of FIGC to last place of the league, causing the team to play the next season in Serie D.

==== Exclusion from Serie D ====
On 28 July 2011 the team was excluded from Serie D, after not having appealed the exclusion of Covisod from this league.

=== The last season 2011–12 in Seconda Categoria ===
In the season 2011–12 the club restarts from Seconda Categoria Lazio group L. It was relegated to Terza Categoria and dissolved.

=== Refoundation ===
The club was refounded in 2014 as a rebranding of Real Pomezia and admitted to Eccellenza. After ending the 2018–19 season in second place, Pomezia was admitted to Serie D for the 2019–20 season to fill a vacancy, but because of Covid suspension in March was relegated in Eccellenza while occupying the 15th place in the League table.

In June 2022, after a play-off final won against the well known U.S. Livorno 1915, it come back to Serie D for the next season.

== Colors and badge ==
Its colors were red and blue and its symbol was the dragon.

== Stadium ==
It plays at the Stadio Comunale, in Pomezia, Italy with a capacity of 2,500.
