= US Bitonto =

Italian football club

Bitonto
- Full name: Unione Sportiva Bitonto
- Founded: 1921
- Ground: Stadio Città degli ulivi
- Capacity: 2,000
- Chairman: Francesco Paolo Noviello
- Manager: Roberto Taurino
- League: Eccellenza Apulia
- 2023–24: Serie D Group H, 17th of 18 (relegated)
Home colours	Away colours

Unione Sportiva Bitonto is an Italian football club located in Bitonto, Apulia. Its colors are black and green.

Bitonto were promoted for the first time in history to Serie C in 2019–20 as champions of Serie D, following the early conclusion of the league due to the COVID-19 pandemic.
