= FC Neapolis =

Italian football club

Neapolis
- Full name: Football Club Neapolis
- Founded: 2008 (Football Club Neapolis Mugnano); 2012 (Football Club Torre Neapolis 1944); 2014 (Football Club Neapolis)
- Dissolved: 2015
- Ground: Stadio Alberto Vallefuoco, Mugnano di Napoli, Italy
- Capacity: 2,500
- 2014–15: Serie D/I, 5th (withdrew after the team failed to register for next season)
Home colours	Away colours

F.C. Neapolis was an Italian association football club located in Mugnano di Napoli, Campania.

== History ==
=== Sporting Neapolis in Serie C2 ===
Old Sporting Neapolis logo

In 2006 after the bankruptcy of F.C. Sangiuseppese, Mario Moxedano and Ezio Bouchè acquired its sport title founding Football Club Neapolis and then Football Club Sporting Neapolis, moving to Naples (training at Sant'Antimo). But the new name not was recognized by Lega Calcio Serie C and many of the former Sangiuseppese players remained at the club.

Neapolis were successful in the 2006–07 season, they achieved promotion from Serie D after beating out competition from Angri and Siracusa. For the next season, the club has played in Serie C2 and shared the Stadio Arturo Collana in the Vomero area of Naples with Internapoli Camaldoli.

=== Neapolis Mugnano in Lega Pro Seconda Divisione ===
At the end of the season 2007–08 the club was relegated back to Serie D and in summer 2008 renamed Football Club Neapolis Mugnano and played in Mugnano di Napoli until 2011. During the 2009–10 season it achieved promotion into Lega Pro Seconda Divisione.

=== Neapolis Frattese and the return to Mugnano ===
At the end of the 2010–11 season the club merged with A.S.D. Virtus Frattese of Frattamaggiore changing its denomination to Football Club Neapolis Frattese and transferring their seat to Frattamaggiore. The club also changed its colours to black with a white star, reflecting the historical colors of Frattese. Anyway, in December 2011, the club returned in Mugnano di Napoli with the previous denomination. In this season it was relegated to Serie D.

=== Torre Neapolis ===
On 12 July 2012 the President Mario Moxedano has transferred the club to the city of Torre del Greco with the new name of F.C. Torre Neapolis 1944. in order to continue the soccer history of Turris 1944, after the transfer of its sports title to Real Hyria Nola.

==== Turris Neapolis ====
In the summer 2013 the club changed its name to F.C. Turris Neapolis 1944.

=== Neapolis and end of the road ===
In the summer 2014 F.C. Torre Neapolis 1944 returned in Mugnano di Napoli and changed its name to F.C. Neapolis. The club played one more season in Serie D until it folded after it was not enrolled for 2015–16 as Napoli police acted against match fixing, arresting President Mario Moxedano, sports director Antonio Ciccarone, and player Raffaele Moxedano.

== Colors and badge ==
Its colors were white and blue.

== Honors ==
- Serie D / Interregionale
  - Champions: 1989–90, 2006–07
- Coppa Italia Serie D
  - Champions: 2012–13
- Eccellenza Campania
  - Champions: 1998–99
- Promozione Campania
  - Champions: 1979–80, 1980–81, 1988–89, 1997–98
