= ASD Astrea =

Italian football club

Astrea
- Full name: Associazione Sportiva Dilettantistica Astrea
- Nickname(s): Le Stelle (The Stars)
- Founded: 1948
- Ground: Stadio Casal del Marmo, Rome, Italy
- Capacity: 2,500
- Chairman: Franco Ionta
- League: Eccellenza Lazio
- 2015–16: Serie D/G, 18th (relegated)
Home colours	Away colours

Associazione Sportiva Dilettantistica Astrea, simply known as Astrea, is an Italian association football club located in Rome, Lazio. It currently plays in Eccellenza Lazio.

== History ==
The club was founded in 1948.

Astrea is the team of the Italian Polizia Penitenziaria, the police corp in charge of the control of prisons.

== Colors and badge ==
Its colors are white and blue.

== Honours ==
- Coppa Italia Dilettanti:
  - Champion: 1996–97
