= US Vibonese Calcio =

Italian football club

- Full name: US Vibonese Calcio
- Nicknames: I Leoni (The Lions); Il Rossoblù (The Red & Blue); Gli Ipponici (Those From Hipponion, ancient name of the city); I Monteleonesi (The Monteleonese)
- Founded: 1928
- Ground: Stadio Luigi Razza, Vibo Valentia, Italy
- Capacity: 6,000
- Chairman: Giuseppe Caffo
- Manager: Michele Facciolo
- League: Serie D Group I
- 2023–24: Serie D Group I, 3rd of 18
- Website: https://www.usvibonese.com/
Home colours	Away colours	Third colours

Unione Sportiva Vibonese Calcio is an Italian association football club located in Vibo Valentia, Calabria. It currently plays in Serie D.

== History ==
Vibonese was founded in 1928.

The club in the season 2011–12 was relegated from Lega Pro Seconda Divisione to Serie D after losing the final playout against Mantova. They returned to Serie C in 2018 under the tenure of former Serie A manager Nevio Orlandi.

== Colors and badge ==
Its colors are red and blue.

== Current squad ==
As of 18 July 2024

Note: Flags indicate national team as defined under FIFA eligibility rules; some limited exceptions apply. Players may hold more than one non-FIFA nationality.

No.	Pos.	Nation	Player
3	DF	ITA	Octavio Casalongue
6	MF	ITA	Rayane Ayad
13	DF	ITA	Pietro Terranova
14	FW	ITA	Facundo Onraita
19	FW	ITA	Wilkerg Castillo
21	MF	ITA	Saverio Staropoli
22	GK	ITA	Jacopo Del Bello
32	MF	ITA	Domenico Anzelmo

No.	Pos.	Nation	Player
34	DF	ITA	Gianpaolo Carbone
50	FW	ITA	Francesco La Torre
81	FW	ITA	Vincenzo Furina
91	MF	ROU	Raoui Mal
—	FW	ITA	Ciro Favetta
—	MF	ITA	Gianluca Pirvu

=== Out on loan ===
Note: Flags indicate national team as defined under FIFA eligibility rules; some limited exceptions apply. Players may hold more than one non-FIFA nationality.

No.	Pos.	Nation	Player
