= 2006–07 Serie D =

Serie D
- Season: 2006–07

The 2006–07 Serie D was the fifty-ninth edition of the top level Italian non-professional football championship. It represented the fifth tier in the Italian football league system.

The regular season started September 17, 2006 and continued through to May 6, 2007.

== Final standings ==
=== Legend ===
Promoted	Relegated after playoffs	Directly relegated

=== Girone A ===
Teams from Piedmont, Liguria & Lombardy

Pos	Club	Pld	Pts
1	Canavese	34	74
2	Savona	34	67
3	Casale	34	61
4	Orbassano	34	52
5	Voghera	34	51
6	Giaveno	34	50
7	Alessandria	34	50
8	Lavagnese	34	48
9	Pro Belvedere Vercelli	34	47
10	Borgomanero	34	44
11	Rivarolese	34	39
12	Imperia	34	37
13	Sestri Levante	34	35
14	Vado	34	32
15	Saluzzo	34	32
16	Canelli	34	32
17	Casteggio Broni	34	26
18	Castellettese	34	25

=== Girone B ===
Teams from Lombardy & Sardinia

Pos	Club	Pld	Pts
1	Tempio (R)	34	65
2	U.S.O. Calcio (P)	34	58
3	Alghero	34	57
4	Como	34	54
5	Arzachena	34	53
6	Solbiatese	34	50
7	Tritium	34	49
8	Olginatese	34	47
9	Turate	34	46
10	Colognese	34	46
11	Villacidrese	34	45
12	Merate	34	45
13	Renate (T)	34	43
14	Fanfulla	34	41
15	Palazzolo (R)	34	39
16	Calangianus	34	35
17	Seregno (R)	34	25
18	Atletico Calcio (R)	34	17

=== Girone C ===
Teams from Trentino-Alto Adige/Südtirol, Veneto &
Friuli-Venezia Giulia

Pos	Club	Pld	Pts
1	Mezzocorona	34	67
2	Sambonifacese	34	58
3	Itala San Marco	34	56
4	Virtusvecomp	34	56
5	Union Quinto	34	54
6	Jesolo	34	51
7	Tamai	34	48
8	Sacilese	34	46
9	Belluno	34	45
10	Montebelluna	34	45
11	Eurocalcio Cassola	34	43
12	Montecchio M.	34	43
13	Trento	34	39
14	Sanvitese	34	38
15	Bolzano	34	37
16	Rivignano	34	35
17	Pordenone	34	35
18	Porfido Albiano	34	23

=== Girone D ===
Teams from Lombardy, Veneto &
Emilia-Romagna

Pos	Club	Pld	Pts
1	Rodengo Saiano	34	67
2	Castellarano	34	64
3	Chioggia S.	34	59
4	Carpi	34	55
5	Giacomense	34	53
6	Russi	34	50
7	Salò	34	49
8	Mezzolara	34	47
9	Castellana	34	47
10	Darfo Boario	34	46
11	Virtus Castelfranco	34	45
12	Castel San Pietro	34	45
13	Este	34	44
14	Fidenza	34	40
15	Santarcangelo	34	32
16	Reno Centese	34	30
17	Piovese	34	30
18	Cervia	34	25

=== Girone E ===
Teams from Liguria, Tuscany & Umbria

Pos	Club	Pld	Pts
1	Esperia Viareggio	34	75
2	Figline	34	65
3	Forcoli	34	57
4	Cecina	34	54
5	Pontedera	34	53
6	Cascina	34	51
7	Montevarchi	34	45
8	Arrone	34	44
9	Sarzanese	34	43
10	Fo.Ce. Vara	34	42
11	Orvietana	34	41
12	Armando Picchi	34	41
13	Sansepolcro	34	40
14	Fortis Juventus	34	39
15	Aglianese	34	37
16	Sestese	34	36
17	Sangimignano	34	31
18	Forte dei Marmi	34	30

=== Girone F ===
Teams from Emilia-Romagna, Marche & Abruzzo

Pos	Club	Pld	Pts
1	Valle del Giovenco	34	67
2	Fano	34	59
3	Real Montecchio	34	59
4	Avezzano	34	56
5	Renato Curi Angolana	34	55
6	Cagliese	34	49
7	Sangiustese	34	49
8	Santegidiese	34	48
9	Maceratese	34	46
10	Morro d'Oro	34	45
11	Tolentino	34	44
12	Grottammare	34	43
13	Centobuchi	34	42
14	Pergolese	34	42
15	Verucchio	34	40
16	Penne	34	35
17	Valleverde Riccione	34	24
18	Cattolica	34	17

=== Girone G ===
Teams from Umbria, Lazio, Molise &
Campania

Pos	Club	Pld	Pts
1	Scafatese	34	80
2	Sibilla Cuma	34	75
3	Isola Liri	34	64
4	Albalonga	34	60
5	Campobasso	34	54
6	Ferentino	34	53
7	Ostiamare	34	46
8	Bojano	34	46
9	Guidonia	34	44
10	Narnese	34	42
11	Monterotondo	34	41
12	Astrea	34	40
13	Venafro	34	39
14	Morolo	34	37
15	Tivoli	34	33
16	Pisoniano	34	32
17	Anziolavinio	34	27
18	Civitavecchiese	34	24

=== Girone H ===
Teams from Molise, Campania, Apulia &
Basilicata

Pos	Club	Pld	Pts
1	Noicattaro	34	66
2	Aversa Normanna	34	65
3	Grottaglie	34	64
4	Barletta	34	55
5	Brindisi	34	55
6	Ischia	34	55
7	Sant'Antonio Abate	34	54
8	Turris	34	53
9	Viribus Unitis	34	48
10	Ippogrifo Sarno	34	47
11	Francavilla	34	46
12	Matera	34	45
13	Bitonto	34	44
14	Ebolitana	34	41
15	Lavello	34	35
16	Sporting Genzano	34	31
17	Leonessa Altamura	34	17
18	Petacciato	34	5

=== Girone I ===
Teams from Campania, Calabria & Sicily

Pos	Club	Pld	Pts
1	Neapolis	34	74
2	Angri	34	63
3	Siracusa	34	59
4	Cosenza	34	52
5	Savoia	34	52
6	Castrovillari	34	50
7	Ragusa	34	48
8	Comiso	34	46
9	Adrano	34	45
10	Sapri	34	45
11	Paternò	34	44
12	Pomigliano	34	43
13	Giarre	34	40
14	Acicatena	34	39
15	Licata	34	36
16	Campobello	34	35
17	Rossanese	34	30
18	Paolana	34	17

== Division winners ==
All teams promoted to 2007–08 Serie C2

Division	Winners
A	Canavese
B	Tempio
C	Mezzocorona
D	Rodengo Saiano
E	Esperia Viareggio
F	Valle del Giovenco
G	Scafatese
H	Noicattaro
I	Neapolis

== Scudetto Dilettanti ==
=== First round ===
- Division winners placed into 3 groups of 3
- Group winners and best second-placed team qualify for semi-finals

==== Group A ====
Pos	Team	Pld	W	D	L	GF	GA	GD	Pts
1	Tempio (B)	2	1	1	0	4	2	+2	4
2	Rodengo Saiano (D)	2	0	2	0	3	3	0	2
3	Canavese (A)	2	0	1	1	1	3	−2	1

Tempio	2–0	Canavese
Canavese	1–1	Rodengo Saiano
Rodengo Saiano	2–2	Tempio

==== Group B ====
Pos	Team	Pld	W	D	L	GF	GA	GD	Pts
1	Valle del Giovenco (F)	2	1	1	0	5	2	+3	4
2	Esperia Viareggio (E)	2	1	0	1	4	6	−2	3
3	Mezzocorona (C)	2	0	1	1	3	4	−1	1

Esperia Viareggio	1–4	Valle del Giovenco
Mezzocorona	2–3	Esperia Viareggio
Valle del Giovenco	1–1	Mezzocorona

==== Group C ====
Pos	Team	Pld	W	D	L	GF	GA	GD	Pts
1	Scafatese (G)	2	1	1	0	7	5	+2	4
2	Neapolis (I)	2	1	1	0	6	4	+2	4
3	Noicattaro (H)	2	0	0	2	1	5	−4	0

Noicattaro	0–2	Neapolis
Scafatese	3–1	Noicattaro
Neapolis	4–4	Scafatese

=== Semi-finals ===
First leg: May 25; return leg: June 2

Team 1	Agg.	Team 2	1st leg	2nd leg
Scafatese (G)	3–4	Tempio (B)	3–2	0–2
Neapolis (I)	6–2	Valle del Giovenco (F)	3–2	3–0

=== Final ===
June 9, Città Sant'Angelo

Team 1	Score	Team 2
Tempio (B)	4–1	Neapolis (I)

Winners: U.S. Tempio

== Promotion playoffs ==
=== Rules ===
Promotion playoffs involved a total of 36 teams, four for each Serie D group (teams from 2nd to 5th place). The first round is a one-legged match between respectively the second and fifth placed, and the third and fourth placed for each group, and are played at best placed club home field. The two winners for each of these matches are elected to play against each other in the second round, again with home advantage to the club best classified in the regular season. The nine winners are then split in three groups composed by three teams (triangolari). The three group winners and the best runner-up play in the semifinal round. The semifinals are both two-legged, and the respective winners are admitted to play in a one-legged final hosted in a neutral ground. The tournament winner and runner-up are placed at the top of the special list of teams eligible for a repechage, i.e. the admission to Serie C2 in case league vacancies need to be filled.

=== First round ===
- Played on May 13; single-legged matches played at best placed club home field
- 2nd-placed team plays 5th-placed team, and 3rd plays 4th in each division

Team 1	Score	Team 2
Savona (A2)	1–2	(A5) Voghera
Casale (A3)	1–0	(A4) Orbassano
U.S.O. Calcio (B2)	3–3 (a.e.t.)(8–7 p)	(B5) Arzachena
Alghero (B3)	2–2 (a.e.t.)(1–4 p)	(B4) Como
Sambonifacese (C2)	1–0	(C5) Union Quinto
Virtusvecomp (C3)	0–2	(C4) Itala San Marco
Castellarano (D2)	2–1 (a.e.t.)	(D5) Giacomense
Chioggia Sottomarina (D3)	1–2	(D4) Carpi
Figline (E2)	2–0 (a.e.t.)	(E5) Pontedera
Forcoli (E3)	4–4 (a.e.t.)(7–4 p)	(E4) Cecina
Fano (F2)	2–1	(F5) Renato Curi
Real Montecchio (F3)	1–0	(F4) Avezzano
Sibilla Cuma (G2)	4–1	(G5) Campobasso
Isola Liri (G3)	2–1 (a.e.t.)	(G4) Albalonga
Aversa Normanna (H2)	2–1	(H5) Brindisi
Grottaglie (H3)	1–1 (a.e.t.)(2–4 p)	(H4) Barletta
Angri (I2)	0–1	(I5) Savoia
Siracusa (I3)	3–1	(I4) Cosenza

=== Second round ===
- Single-legged matches played at best placed club home field
- One team from each division moves on to third round

Team 1	Score	Team 2
Casale (A3)	1–0	(A5) Voghera
U.S.O. Calcio (B2)	4–2 (a.e.t.)	(B4) Como
Sambonifacese (C2)	2–2 (a.e.t.)(15–16 p)	(C4) Itala San Marco
Castellarano (D2)	5-0	(D4) Carpi
Figline (E2)	1–2	(E3) Forcoli
Fano (F2)	2–0	(F3) Real Montecchio
Sibilla Cuma (G2)	3–2	(G3) Isola Liri
Aversa Normanna (H2)	3–2 (a.e.t.)	(H4) Barletta
Siracusa (I3)	1–0	(I5) Savoia

=== Third round ===
- Group winners and best second-placed team qualify for semi-finals

==== Group A ====
Pos	Team	Pld	W	D	L	GF	GA	GD	Pts
1	U.S.O. Calcio (B2)	2	2	0	0	2	0	+2	6
2	Sibilla Cuma (G2)	2	1	0	1	4	1	+3	3
3	Castellarano (D2)	2	0	0	2	0	5	−5	0

Source: rsssf.com

U.S.O. Calcio	1–0	Sibilla Cuma
Sibilla Cuma	4–0	Castellarano
Castellarano	0–1	U.S.O. Calcio

==== Group B ====
Pos	Team	Pld	W	D	L	GF	GA	GD	Pts
1	Casale (A3)	2	1	1	0	3	1	+2	4
2	Forcoli (E3)	2	0	2	0	2	2	0	2
3	Fano (F2)	2	0	1	1	1	3	−2	1

Source: rsssf.com

Fano	1–1	Forcoli
Casale	2–0	Fano
Forcoli	1–1	Casale

==== Group C ====
Pos	Team	Pld	W	D	L	GF	GA	GD	Pts
1	Siracusa (I3)	2	1	0	1	3	2	+1	3
2	Aversa Normanna (H2)	2	1	0	1	4	4	0	3
3	Itala San Marco (C4)	2	1	0	1	2	3	−1	3

Source: rsssf.com

Siracusa	3–1	Aversa Normanna
Aversa Normanna	3–1	Itala San Marco
Itala San Marco	1–0	Siracusa

=== Semi-finals ===
First leg: June 10; return leg: June 17

Team 1	Agg.	Team 2	1st leg	2nd leg
U.S.O. Calcio (B2)	0–4	Casale (A3)	0–2	0–2
Siracusa (I3)	2–3	Sibilla Cuma (G2)	0–1	2–2

=== Final ===
June 24, 2007, Figline Valdarno

Team 1	Score	Team 2
Casale (A3)	0–0 (4–3 p)	Sibilla Cuma (G2)

== Relegations ==
Four relegations per division, 17th & 18th placed teams and playoff losers

=== Direct relegations ===
Girone A

- Casteggio Broni (18th)
- Castellettese (17th)

Girone B

- Atletico Calcio (18th)
- Seregno (17th)

Girone C

- Porfido Albiano (18th)
- Pordenone (17th - after tie-breaker)

Girone D

- Cervia (18th)
- Piovese (17th - after tie-breaker)

Girone E

- Forte dei Marmi (18th)
- Sangimignano (17th)

Girone F

- Cattolica (18th)
- Valleverde Riccione (17th)

Girone G

- Civitavecchiese (18th)
- Anziolavinio (17th)

Girone H

- Petacciato (18th)
- Leonessa Altamura (17th)

Girone I

- Paolana (18th)
- Rossanese (17th)

==== Tie-Breakers ====
Played on May 13, 2007

Team 1	Score	Team 2
Pordenone (C)	0-1	Rivignano (C)
Reno Centese (D)	1–0	Piovese (D)

Pordenone & Piovese relegated to Eccellenza, Rivignano and Reno Centese admitted to relegation playoffs

=== Relegation playoffs ===
Played May 20 & 27, 2007

- In case of aggregate tie score, higher classified team wins
- Team highlighted in green saved, the others are relegated to Eccellenza

Team 1	Agg.	Team 2	1st leg	2nd leg
Canelli (A16)	1–1	(A13) Vado	1–0	0-1
Saluzzo (A15)	3–3	(A14) Sestri Levante	2-1	1–2
Calangianus (B16)	4–3	(B13) Renate	3–0	1–3
Palazzolo (B15)	1–1	(B14) Fanfulla	0–1	1–0
Rivignano (C16)	1–1	(C13) Trento	1–1	0–0
Bolzano (C15)	4–4	(C14) Sanvitese	3–0	1–4
Reno Centese (D16)	1–2	(D13) Este	0–1	1–1
Santarcangelo (D15)	4–2	(D14) Fidenza	2–2	2–0
Sestese (E16)	4–4	(E13) Sansepolcro	1–0	3–4
Aglianese (E15)	2–2	(E14) Fortis Juventus	1–1	1–1
Penne (F16)	0–1	(F13) Centobuchi	0–1	0–0
Verucchio (F15)	4-3	(F14) Pergolese	1–1	3–2
Pisoniano (G16)	1-3	(G13) Venafro	0–1	1–2
Tivoli (G15)	2–4	(G14) Morolo	1–0	1–4
Sporting Genzano (H16)	1–1	(H13) Bitonto	0–0	1–1
Lavello (H15)	2–1	(H14) Ebolitana	2–1	0–0
Campobello (I16)	3–1	(I13) Giarre	2–0	1–1
Licata (I15)	1–4	(I14) Acicatena	1–1	0–3
