= 2005–06 Eccellenza =

This is a list of round winners and playoff matches in the regionally organized Eccellenza 2005/2006.

Like the 2011–12 season, there were 48 groups into 9 squads a one.

== Division winners ==
	Region/Division	Winners	Promoted to	
1	Abruzzo	Santegidiese	Girone F	*
2	Basilicata	Sporting Genzano	Girone H	
3	Calabria	Paolana	Girone I	*
4	Campania – A	Ischia	Girone H	
5	Campania – B	Sant'Antonio Abate	Girone H	
6	Emilia-Romagna – A	Fidenza	Girone D	
7	Emilia-Romagna – B	Giacomense	Girone D	
8	Friuli-Venezia Giulia	Pordenone	Girone D	
9	Lazio – A	Anziolavinio	Girone G	*
10	Lazio – B	Morolo	Girone G	
11	Liguria	Imperia	Girone A	*
12	Lombardy – A	Turate	Girone B	
13	Lombardy – B	Merate	Girone B	
14	Lombardy – C	Darfo Boario	Girone D	
15	Marche	Centobuchi	Girone F	
16	Molise	Petacciato	Girone H	
17	Piedmont & Aosta Valley – A	Canelli	Girone A	
18	Piedmont & Aosta Valley- B	Rivarolese	Girone A	
19	Apulia	Barletta	Girone H	
20	Sardinia	Tempio	Girone B	
21	Sicily – A	Paternò	Girone I	
22	Sicily – B	Licata	Girone I	*
23	Tuscany – A	Esperia Viareggio	Girone E	*
24	Tuscany – B	Figline	Girone E	
25	Trentino-Alto Adige/Südtirol	Porfido Albiano	Girone C	
26	Umbria	Arrone	Girone E	
27	Veneto – A	Virtusvecomp Verona	Girone C	*
28	Veneto – B	Union Quinto	Girone C	

* a second team promoted via playoffs – see below

== Regional playoffs ==
- Note: Eccellenza Liguria, Trentino-Alto Adige/Südtirol, Veneto, Friuli-Venezia Giulia, Emilia-Romagna, Lazio, Basilicata and Sardinia did not organize any regional playoff, but admitted directly the second-placed team to the national phase.
- A special tiebreaker playoff was held in Eccellenza Veneto B, as the second and the third placed teams ended the regular season with the same points.

=== Piedmont A ===
4th-place Tie-breaker

Team 1	Score	Team 2
Asti	2–1	Acqui

Playoff semifinals

Team 1	Agg.	Team 2	1st leg	2nd leg
Asti	1–2	Borgosesia	0–1	1–1

Playoff finals

Team 1	Agg.	Team 2	1st leg	2nd leg
Borgosesia	3–3(b)	Biella L.M.	2–2	1–1

Teams admitted to playoffs
Position	Team	Points
2nd	Biella L.M.	56
3rd	Borgosesia	56
4th	Asti	54
5th	Acqui	54

=== Piedmont B ===
Playoff semifinals

Team 1	Agg.	Team 2	1st leg	2nd leg
Bra	2–1	Pool Cirievauda	1–0	1–1

Playoff finals

Team 1	Agg.	Team 2	1st leg	2nd leg
Bra	0–2	Nova Colligiana	0–0	0–2

Teams admitted to playoffs
Position	Team	Points
2nd	Nova Colligiana	54
3rd	Pool Cirievauda	50
4th	Bra	50

=== Lombardy A ===
5th-Place Tiebreaker

Team 1	Score	Team 2
Corsico	1–0	Gavirate

Playoff semifinals

Team 1	Agg.	Team 2	1st leg	2nd leg
Corsico	3–1	Sancolombano	0–0	3–1
Verbano	1–2	Saronno	1–0	0–2

Playoff final

Team 1	Score	Team 2
Saronno	0–1	Corsico

Teams admitted to playoffs
Position	Team	Points
2nd	Sancolombano	65
3rd	Saronno	62
4th	Verbano	59
5th	Corsico	54
6th	Gavirate	54

=== Lombardy B ===
Playoff semifinals

Team 1	Agg.	Team 2	1st leg	2nd leg
Voluntas Osio di Sotto	2–1	Galbiatese	0–0	2–1
Mariano	2–3	Cantù	1–2	1–1

Playoff final

Team 1	Score	Team 2
Cantù	0–2	Voluntas Osio di Sotto

Teams admitted to playoffs
Position	Team	Points
2nd	Galbiatese	58
3rd	Cantù	56
4th	Mariano	50
5th	Voluntas Osio di Sotto	50

=== Lombardy C ===
Playoff semifinals

Team 1	Agg.	Team 2	1st leg	2nd leg
Castelcovati	(b)4–4	Verolese	2–2	2–2
Suzzara	0–3	Serenissima	0–2	0–1

Playoff final

Team 1	Score	Team 2
Castelcovati	0–1	Serenissima

Teams admitted to playoffs
Position	Team	Points
2nd	Castelcovati	61
3rd	Serenissima	60
4th	Suzzara	60
5th	Verolese	55

=== Veneto B ===
Playoff

Team 1	Score	Team 2
Mestre Edo	2–1	Romano d'Ezzelino

Teams admitted to playoffs
Position	Team	Points
2nd	Mestre Edo	55
3rd	Romano d'Ezzelino	55

=== Tuscany A ===
Playoff semifinals

Team 1	Agg.	Team 2	1st leg	2nd leg
Camaiore	(b)1–1	Forte dei Marmi	1–1	0–0
Larcianese	4–2	Castelfranco	1–0	3–2

Playoff final

Team 1	Agg.	Team 2	1st leg	2nd leg
Larcianese	2–2(b)	Forte dei Marmi	2–1	0–1

Teams admitted to playoffs
Position	Team	Points
2nd	Forte dei Marmi	58
3rd	Castelfranco	52
4th	Larcianese	48
5th	Camaiore	44

=== Tuscany B ===
Playoff semifinals

Team 1	Agg.	Team 2	1st leg	2nd leg
San Piero a Sieve	1–1(b)	Scandicci	0–0	1–1
Calenzano	2–3	Castelnuovese	1–0	1–3

Playoff final

Team 1	Agg.	Team 2	1st leg	2nd leg
Castelnuovese	5–4	Scandicci	4–2	1–2

Teams admitted to playoffs
Position	Team	Points
2nd	Scandicci	68
3rd	Castelnuovese	59
4th	Calenzano	50
5th	San Piero a Sieve	44

=== Umbria ===
Playoff semifinals

Team 1	Agg.	Team 2	1st leg	2nd leg
Trestina	2–1	Pontevecchio	2–0	0–1
Valfabbrica	0–1	Deruta	0–1	0–0

Playoff final

Team 1	Score	Team 2
Deruta	2–0	Trestina

Teams admitted to playoffs
Position	Team	Points
2nd	Pontevecchio	56
3rd	Deruta	55
4th	Valfabbrica	50
5th	Trestina	48

=== Marche ===
Playoff semifinals

Team 1	Agg.	Team 2	1st leg	2nd leg
Cingolana	3–2	Jesina	2–2	1–0
Biagio Nazzaro	3–3(b)	Montegiorgese	1–2	2–1

Playoff final

Team 1	Score	Team 2
Montegiorgese	1–0	Cingolana

Teams admitted to playoffs
Position	Team	Points
2nd	Jesina	64
3rd	Montegiorgese	59
4th	Biagio Nazzaro	57
5th	Cingolana	57

=== Abruzzo ===
Playoff semifinals

Team 1	Agg.	Team 2	1st leg	2nd leg
Atessa	2–3	Valle del Giovenco	1–2	1–1
Cologna Paese	2–1	Hatria	0–0	2–1

Playoff final

Team 1	Score	Team 2
Valle del Giovenco	2–1	Cologna Paese

Teams admitted to playoffs
Position	Team	Points
2nd	Valle del Giovenco	73
3rd	Hatria	71
4th	Cologna Paese	60
5th	Atessa	59

=== Molise ===
Playoff semifinals

Team 1	Agg.	Team 2	1st leg	2nd leg
Atletico Trivento	1–1(b)	Termoli	0–0	1–1
Sesto Campano	3–3(b)	Agnonese	3–1	0–2

Playoff final

Team 1	Score	Team 2
Termoli	0–2	Agnonese

Teams admitted to playoffs
Position	Team	Points
2nd	Termoli	69
3rd	Agnonese	65
4th	Sesto Campano	56
5th	Atletico Trivento	52

=== Campania A ===
Playoff semifinals

Team 1	Score	Team 2
Internapoli	(b)0–0	Boys Caivanese
Succivo	(b)1–1	Casertana

Playoff final

Team 1	Score	Team 2
Internapoli	2–0	Succivo

Teams admitted to playoffs
Position	Team	Points
2nd	Internapoli	59
3rd	Succivo	55
4th	Casertana	52
5th	Boys Caivanese	52

=== Campania B ===
Playoff semifinals

Team 1	Score	Team 2
Gragnano	3–0	Agropoli
Vico Equense	3–1	Gebilson Cilento

Playoff final

Team 1	Score	Team 2
Gragnano	3–0	Vico Equense

Teams admitted to playoffs
Position	Team	Points
2nd	Gragnano	72
3rd	Vico Equense	59
4th	Gebilson Cilento	53
5th	Agropoli	51

=== Apulia ===
Playoff semifinals

Team 1	Agg.	Team 2	1st leg	2nd leg
Virtus Locorotondo	2–7	Fasano	2–3	0–4
Francavilla Fontana	1–1(b)	Real Altamura	1–0	0–1

Playoff final

Team 1	Agg.	Team 2	1st leg	2nd leg
Francavilla Fontana	3–5	Fasano	2–1	1–4

Teams admitted to playoffs
Position	Team	Points
2nd	Fasano	57
3rd	Real Altamura	57
4th	Francavilla Fontana	55
5th	Virtus Locorotondo	54

=== Calabria ===
Playoff semifinals

Team 1	Agg.	Team 2	1st leg	2nd leg
Scalea	1–3	Castrovillari	0–2	1–1
Sambiase	2–4	Capo Vaticano	1–0	1–4

Playoff final

Team 1	Agg.	Team 2	1st leg	2nd leg
Capo Vaticano	2–2(b)	Castrovillari	1–1	1–1

Teams admitted to playoffs
Position	Team	Points
2nd	Castrovillari	66
3rd	Capo Vaticano	55
4th	Sambiase	51
5th	Scalea	48

=== Sicily A ===
Playoff semifinals

Team 1	Score	Team 2
Trecastagni	(b)1–1	Carini
Acicatena	2–1	Atletico Tremestieri

Playoff final

Team 1	Score	Team 2
Trecastagni	0–2	Acicatena

Teams admitted to playoffs
Position	Team	Points
2nd	Trecastagni	54
3rd	Acicatena	51
4th	Atletico Tremestieri	49
5th	Carini	48

=== Sicily B ===
Playoff semifinals

Team 1	Score	Team 2
Akragas	(b)0–0	Enna
Palazzolo	0–3	Nissa

Playoff final

Team 1	Score	Team 2
Akragas	2–1	Nissa

Teams admitted to playoffs
Position	Team	Points
2nd	Akragas	61
3rd	Palazzolo	60
4th	Nissa	60
5th	Enna	46

- (b) — Team who best placed in the regular season qualifies for the next round.

== National playoffs ==
=== First round ===
Team 1	Agg.	Team 2	1st leg	2nd leg
Sevegliano (Friuli)	2–3	La Nuova Piovese (Veneto A)	0–1	2–2
Corsico (Lombardy A)	5–2	Nova Colligiana (Piedmont B)	2–1	3–1
Serenissima (Lombardy C)	1–6	Biella L.M. (Piedmont A)	1–2	0–4
Mestre Edo (Veneto B)	3–4	Sarzanese (Liguria)	1–3	2–1
Copparese (Emilia Romagna B)	3–8	Valle del Giovenco (Abruzzo)	2–3	1–5
Voluntas Osio di Sotto (Lombardy B)	4–1	St. Pauls (Trentino-Alto Adige/Südtirol)	3–1	1–0
Terracina (Latium B)	1–3	Forte dei Marmi (Tuscany A)	1–2	0–1
Castelnuovese (Tuscany B)	1–0	Deruta (Umbria)	1–0	0–0
Formigine (Emilia Romagna A)	1–3	Budoni (Sardinia)	0–0	1–3
Civitavecchiese (Latium A)	3–2	Montegiorgio (Marche)	2–1	1–1
Akragas (Sicily B)	0–4	Fasano (Apulia)	0–1	0–3
Agnonese (Molise)	3–6	Acicatena (Sicily A)	2–3	1–3
Gragnano (Campania B)	5–2	Internapoli (Campania B)	2–0	3–2
Castrovillari (Calabria)	2–1	Avigliano (Basilicata)	1–0	1–1

=== Second round ===
Team 1	Agg.	Team 2	1st leg	2nd leg
La Nuova Piovese (Veneto A)	4–3	Corsico (Lombardy A)	2–3	2–0
Biella L.M. (Piedmont A)	0–3	Sarzanese (Liguria)	0–0	0–3
Valle del Giovenco (Abruzzo)	4–2	Voluntas Osio di Sotto (Lombardy B)	1–2	3–0
Forte dei Marmi (Tuscany A)	4–3	Castelnuovese (Tuscany B)	2–2	2–1
Budoni (Sardinia)	2–2(a)	Civitavecchiese (Latium A)	2–2	0–0
Fasano (Apulia)	2–4	Acicatena (Sicily A)	2–1	0–3
Gragnano (Campania B)	4–4; 7–10(p)	Castrovillari (Calabria)	3–1	1–3

=== Promoted teams ===
Region/Division	Playoff winners
Abruzzo	Valle del Giovenco
Calabria	Castrovillari
Lazio – A	Civitavecchiese
Liguria	Sarzanese
Sicily – B	Acicatena
Tuscany – A	Forte dei Marmi
Veneto – A	Nuova Piovese

== Coppa Italia Dilettanti ==
2005/2006 Final: Esperia Viareggio (Tuscany – A) 2:0 Real Ippogrifo (Campania – B)

Since Esperia Viareggio won its Eccellenza division, being therefore already promoted, Real Ippogrifo is automatically promoted to Serie D.
