= 2005–06 Serie D =

Serie D
- Season: 2005–06

The 2005–06 Serie D was the fifty-eighth edition of the top level Italian non-professional football championship. It represented the fifth tier in the Italian football league system.

Como Calcio joined with a phoenix club after they suffered bankruptcy in Serie C during the summer.

== List of teams ==
=== Girone A ===
- Alessandria
- Borgomanero
- Canavese
- Casteggio Broni
- Castellettese
- Chiari
- Cossatese
- Giaveno
- Orbassano
- Saluzzo
- Savona
- Solbiatese
- Trino
- U.S.O. Calcio
- Vado
- Varese
- Vigevano
- Voghera

=== Girone B ===
- Alghero
- Arzachena
- Atletico Calcio
- Bergamo Cenate
- Calangianus
- Caratese
- Caravaggio
- Colognese
- Como
- Fanfulla
- Nuorese
- Oggiono
- Olginatese
- AC Palazzolo
- Renate
- Seregno
- Tritium
- Villacidrese

=== Girone C ===
- Boca San Lazzaro
- Carpi
- Castellana
- Castellarano
- Cattolica
- Centese
- Cervia
- Crevalcore
- Meletolese
- Mezzolara
- Reno Centese
- Rodengo Saiano
- Russi
- Salò
- Santarcangelo
- Valleverde Riccione
- Verucchio
- Virtus Castelfranco

=== Girone D ===
Note: In 2005-06, the Girone D was composed of 20 teams instead of the canonical 18 ones.

- Belluno
- Bolzano
- Chioggia Sottomarina
- Cologna Veneta
- Cordignano
- Este
- Eurocalcio Cassola
- Itala San Marco
- Manzanese
- Mezzocorona
- Montebelluna
- Montecchio Maggiore
- Rivignano
- Rovigo
- Sacilese
- Sambonifacese
- Sanvitese
- Tamai
- Trentino
- Vallagarina

=== Girone E ===
- Aglianese
- Armando Picchi
- Cascina
- Cecina
- Fo.Ce. Vara
- Forcoli
- Fortis Juventus
- Fortis Spoleto
- Lavagnese
- Narnese
- Orvietana
- Poggibonsi
- Pontedera
- Rondinella
- Sangimignano
- Sestese
- Sestri Levante
- Venturina

=== Girone F ===
- Albalonga
- Cagliese
- Celano Olimpia
- Fano
- Frascati
- Grottammare
- Maceratese
- Morro d'Oro
- Nuova Avezzano
- Penne
- Pergolese
- Real Montecchio
- Renato Curi Angolana
- Sangiustese
- Sansepolcro
- Tolentino
- Urbino
- Val di Sangro

=== Girone G ===
- Angri
- Aprilia
- Astrea
- Bojano
- Campobasso
- Cassino
- Ferentino
- Guidonia
- Isola Liri
- Montenero
- Monterotondo
- Ostiamare
- Pisoniano
- Pomigliano
- Sorianese
- Spes Mentana
- Tivoli
- Venafro

=== Girone H ===
- Ariano Irpino
- Bitonto
- Brindisi
- Grottaglie
- Lavello
- Manduria
- Matera
- Monopoli
- Noicattaro
- Normanna
- Nuovo Terzigno
- Paganese
- San Paolo Bari
- Sangiuseppese
- Savoia
- Scafatese
- Sibilla El Brazil Cuma
- Solofra

=== Girone I ===
- Adrano
- Alcamo
- Campobello
- Comiso
- Cosenza
- Ebolitana
- Francavilla
- Giarre
- Ragusa
- Rossanese
- Sapri
- Scillese
- Siracusa
- Sorrento
- Trapani
- Turris
- Vibonese
- Viribus Unitis

== Division winners ==
All teams promoted to 2006–07 Serie C2

Round	Winners
A	Varese
B	Nuorese
C	Boca San Lazzaro
D	Rovigo
E	Fortis Spoleto
F	Val di Sangro
G	Cassino
H	Paganese
I	Sorrento

== Promotion playoffs ==
=== First round ===
Single-legged matches played at best placed club home field

Team 1	Score	Team 2
USO Calcio (A)	2–3	Orbassano (A)
Canavese (A)	2–2 (a.e.t.)(5–3 p)	Borgomanero (A)
Palazzolo (B)	3–0	Fanfulla (B)
Tritium (B)	3–0	Como (B)
Castellarano (C)	2–2 (a.e.t.)(1–4 p)	Rodengo Saiano (C)
Salò (C)	2–1 (a.e.t.)	Cervia Vodafone (C)
Tamai (D)	1–2	Sanvitese (D)
Sambonifacese (D)	1–0	Bolzano (D)
Fortis Juventus (E)	3–0	Cascina (E)
Poggibonsi (E)	0–1 (a.e.t.)	Forcoli (E)
Celano (F)	2–0	Penne (F)
Maceratese (F)	0–1	Tolentino (F)
Isola Liri (G)	1–0	Guidonia (G)
Ferentino (G)	0–3	Monterotondo (G)
Monopoli (H)	2–1	Brindisi (H)
Sibilla Cuma (H)	1–0	Scafatese (H)
Vibonese (I)	2–1	Sapri (I)
Cosenza (I)	1–1 (a.e.t.)(5–4 p)	Siracusa (I)

=== Second round ===
Single-legged matches played at best placed club home field

Team 1	Score	Team 2
Canavese (A)	1–2 (a.e.t.)	Orbassano (A)
Palazzolo (B)	2–3	Tritium (B)
Salò (C)	3–2	Rodengo Saiano (C)
Sambonifacese (D)	1–0	Sanvitese (D)
Fortis Juventus (E)	1–0	Forcoli (E)
Celano (F)	1–0	Tolentino (F)
Isola Liri (G)	2–3	Monterotondo (G)
Monopoli (H)	1–0	Sibilla Cuma (H)
Vibonese (I)	2–1	Cosenza (I)

=== Third round (group stage) ===
==== Group 1 ====
Pos	Team	Pld	W	D	L	GF	GA	GD	Pts
1	Orbassano	2	2	0	0	2	0	+2	6
2	Fortis Juventus	2	1	0	1	2	2	0	3
3	Salò	2	0	0	2	1	3	−2	0

Source: rsssf.com

Orbassano	1–0	Fortis Juventus
Fortis Juventus	2–1	Salò
Salò	0–1	Orbassano

==== Group 2 ====
Pos	Team	Pld	W	D	L	GF	GA	GD	Pts
1	Monopoli	2	1	1	0	4	2	+2	4
2	Vibonese	2	0	2	0	3	3	0	2
3	Sambonifacese	2	0	1	1	1	3	−2	1

Source: rsssf.com

Vibonese	2–2	Monopoli
Sambonifacese	1–1	Vibonese
Monopoli	2–0	Sambonifacese

==== Group 3 ====
Pos	Team	Pld	W	D	L	GF	GA	GD	Pts
1	Celano	2	1	1	0	3	2	+1	4
2	Tritium	2	1	0	1	2	2	0	3
3	Monterotondo	2	0	1	1	1	2	−1	1

Source: rsssf.com

Tritium	1–2	Celano
Monterotondo	0–1	Tritium
Celano	1–1	Monterotondo

=== Semi-finals ===
Winning teams are automatically promoted to Serie C2

Team 1	Agg.	Team 2	1st leg	2nd leg
Orbassano	1–5	Monopoli	0-1	1-4
Celano	1–0	Fortis Juventus	1-0	0-0

=== Final ===
Team 1	Score	Team 2
Monopoli	5–2	Celano

== Relegations ==
Girone A

- Chiari
- Cossatese
- Vigevano

Girone B

- Bergamo Cenate
- Caratese
- Caravaggio
- Oggiono

Girone C

- Centese
- Crevalcore
- Meletolese

Girone D

- Cologna Veneta
- Cordignano
- Manzanese
- Vallagarina

Girone E

- Rondinella
- Venturina

Girone F

- Frascati
- Urbino

Girone G

- Aprilia
- Montenero
- Sorianese
- Spes Mentana

Girone H

- Ariano Irpino
- Manduria
- San Paolo Bari
- Sologra
- Nuovo Terzigno

Girone I

- Alcamo
- Scillese
- Trapani
