= Azdren Llullaku =

Albanian footballer

Personal information
- Full name: Azdren Gani Llullaku
- Date of birth: 15 February 1988 (age 38)
- Place of birth: Istok, SR Serbia, SFR Yugoslavia (now Kosovo)
- Height: 1.78 m (5 ft 10 in)
- Position: Forward

Team information
- Current team: SCM Zalău
- Number: 19

Youth career
- 2003–2004: AC Vallata
- 2004–2005: Conegliano

Senior career*
Years	Team	Apps	(Gls)
2005–2006	Conegliano	18	(3)
2006–2010	Sacilese Calcio	31	(8)
2007–2008	→ Südtirol (loan)	12	(0)
2009	→ Domegliara (loan)	33	(11)
2010–2011	Tamai	33	(22)
2011–2012	SandonàJesolo	30	(13)
2012–2016	Gaz Metan Mediaș	93	(17)
2016	Politehnica Iași	14	(0)
2016	Gaz Metan Mediaș	20	(16)
2017	Astana	17	(1)
2017	→ Tobol (loan)	13	(0)
2018	Virtus Entella	4	(0)
2018–2019	Astra Giurgiu	34	(7)
2019–2020	Shakhtyor Soligorsk	13	(1)
2020–2022	Concordia Chiajna	59	(14)
2023	Cjarlins Muzane	14	(1)
2023–2024	Ceahlăul Piatra Neamț	24	(5)
2024–2025	Gloria Bistrița	5	(0)
2025–	SCM Zalău		

International career
2016–2017	Albania	6	(0)
- * Club domestic league appearances and goals as of 3 April 2026

Azdren Gani Llullaku (born 15 February 1988) is a professional footballer who plays as a forward for Liga III club SCM Zalău. Born in Yugoslavia, he represented Albania internationally.

== Club career ==
=== Early career ===
Llullaku was born on 15 February 1988 in Istok, SFR Yugoslavia. Due to the Kosovo War, aged 12, Llullaku moved to Italy along with his mother and his brother, settling in Tarzo in the Province of Treviso, Veneto. He began his youth career with A.C. Vallata 1999, a team of the third category, the lowest level of "amateur" football in Italy.

=== Italian lower divisions ===
In the regional competitions, Llullaku revealed himself to be a talented goalscorer and he was recruited by Denis Florin, sporting director of Conegliano, which played in Eccellenza at that time. Llullaku accepted with enthusiasm and in the 2005–06 season, he started playing with the juniors team, and after ten matches, in December 2005 he transitioned into the senior team by Umberto Trinca and at 17, he scored three goals in 18 matches, helping to avoid a difficult relegation but especially stood out as a player deserving to be a professional.

He moved into Serie D, joining A.S.D. Sacilese Calcio in 2006. In the 2006–07 Season he made a total of 31 appearances and scored eight goals.

In the summer of 2007, Llullaku joined Serie C2 side Südtirol. In the 2007–08 season he made a total of 12 appearances.

In 2008, he joined Serie D side Domegliara. In the 2008–09 season he made a total of 33 appearances and scored 11 goals.

He returned in 2009 to the previous team Sacilese in Lega Pro Seconda Divisione (previous name Serie C2) but didn't made any appearances for entire 2009–10 season due to the law that prohibits the enrollment of non-EU citizens. This made him move to Tamai in Serie D. In the 2010–11 season, he made a total of 33 appearances and scored 22 goals. In February, he was elected by the statistics of the Corriere dello Sport as the best striker in the Serie D and is placed in the Top 11 Serie D.

SandonàJesolo

In 2011, he joined fellow Venetian team SandonàJesolo. On 25 September 2011, Llullaku scored by penalty the opening goal in the victory 2–0 against San Giorgio. Later on 18 December, Llullaku scored hat-trick to give the clean 3–0 victory SandonàJesolo against I.S.M. Gradisca.

In the 2011–12 season he made a total of 30 appearances and scored 13 goals. SandonàJesolo finished in the 6th place in the final rank and qualified for the fourth round of the Promotion play-off as the finalist of 2011–12 Coppa Italia Serie D and were shorted to play against Arezzo. First play-off match against Arezzo played on 27 May 2012 finished in the goalless draw, and then was decided by penalty shoot-out as SandonàJesolo won it by 3–4 result. SandonàJesolo advanced to the semi-finals where they played against Legnago Salus on 3 June 2012 and won the match with the 2–0 result, in which also Llullaku scored the closing goal in the 51st minute after an personally attack himself. SandonàJesolo managed to get in the final and they played against Cosenza, where Llullaku scored the second goal advantage but not enough to win the game as Cosenza came from behind to win the match by the 3–2 result.

Llullaku also managed to play in the Coppa Italia Serie D with SandonàJesolo in the 2011–12 season. SandonàJesolo played in a two-legged match for the semi-final against Bogliasco and the first leg was won by the 1–0 home result, then in the second leg SandonàJesolo lost by the 2–1 result and they qualified due to the away goals rule, where the only away goal was scored by Llullaku himself. They advanced to the final and Llullaku also played in a 2–1 loss for the cup final match against Sant'Antonio Abate.

At the end of the 2011–12 season many professional clubs like Cremonese and Pordenone wanted to buy Llullaku but his foreign players status didn't help him.

=== Gaz Metan Mediaș ===
After spending 6 years in Italy, on 24 July 2012 after a trial, Llullaku signed for Romanian top division side Gaz Metan Mediaș.

Llulaku made his competitive debut on 24 August 2012 during the league match against Turnu Severin, coming on as a substitute in an eventual 2–0 home win. He netted his first goal for the team on 1 December in the match against CFR Cluj, giving his team a 1–1 draw. Llullaku started 2013 by scoring a goal in team's 3–1 win over Gloria Bistrița on 22 February, which was followed by a brace in the 4–1 home win against Viitorul Constanța. Llullaku was again decisive for his team by scoring the lone goal in the match against Concordia Chiajna, giving his team three important points. That was his final strike of the season, as he finished it by playing 22 matches between league and cup, scoring five in the process.

Lullaku lost his place in the starting lineup during the 2013–14 season, making only nine league starts. He scored his first goal of the season on 26 July in the league encounter against Botoșani, finished in a 1–2 defeat. On 25 September 2013, he scored twice in Gaz Metan Mediaș' 0–4 win over Petrolul Ploiești in the Romanian Cup. The 2013–14 season was a bad one for Llullaku; he scored only one league goal in 28 appearances, in addition two Romanian Cup goals in two matches.

Llullaku started 2014–15 season by playing the entire match against Pandurii Târgu Jiu for the quarter-finals of 2014–15 Romanian Cup, which finished in a 1–0 defeat in extra-time. He made his first league appearance for this season on 27 July 2014 in the 3–0 away win over Botoșani. Lullaku scored his first goal of the season on 8 August, a last-minute equalizer against Rapid București in the matchday 3 to give his side a 1–1 draw. On 12 September, during the 3–1 loss against Steaua București in which Llullaku scored his team's only goal, he got injured after just kicked the ball cause of an accident collision with opponent player.

On 5 December, in the matchday 17 against Brașov, Llullaku scored a brace inside first five minutes to give his team a 2–1 win in the last match of 2014. The new year found him injured, as he return to play in the team only in March, playing for 59 minutes in the match against Rapid București, which ended in a 1–0 defeat. He scored his first goal of 2015 on 14 March in the 1–1 draw against Craiova. Llullaku concluded the 2014–15 season with 30 appearances, 16 as a starter and 14 as a substitute in which he scored 8 goals but Gaz Metan Mediaș got relegated as they were ranked in the 13th place of the table, a place which was the higher of the rank which would result relegation.

Llullaku remained at Gaz Metan Mediaș for the 2015–16 season, where he made his Liga II debut on 29 August 2015 in the opening day against UTA Arad. He scored his first goal of campaign on 11 September in the 1–1 home draw against Șoimii Pâncota. Later that month, Llullaku scored his second goal of the season, a 91st-minute penalty, helping his side to earn a 3–3 home draw against Mioveni. On 13 January 2016, Llullaku left Gaz Metan Mediaș after three-and-a-half seasons where he managed to score 17 goals in 93 league appearances. He announced via his official Facebook profile that he has terminated his contract with the club by mutual consensus, being a free agent.

=== CSMS Iași ===
Llullaku returned to Liga I as he signed with CSMS Iași on 30 January 2016. He made his debut on 13 February 2016 against Viitorul Constanța coming on as a substitute in the 82nd minute in place of Nuno Viveiros. During the second part of 2015–16 season, Llullaku made 14 league appearances, including 9 as a starter, collecting 698 minutes, but failed to score a single goal, as CSMS Iași finished the season in the 7th position.

=== Astana ===
On 24 December 2016, Llullaku signed a 2-year contract with Kazakh champions Astana, on a free transfer. His new salary would be from €50K and in the 2017–18 season he has secured a participation in the 2017–18 UEFA Champions League - Second qualifying round.

He made his debut on 4 March 2017 in the Kazakhstan Super Cup against Kairat playing as a starter. He scored his first goal in his 4th match in the Premier League on 17 March 2017 against Akzhayik. Llullaku scored the 2nd goal in the 13th minute and the match finished in the 3–1 victory.

==== Loan to Tobol ====
On 2 July 2017 Llullaku was loaned to fellow Kazakhstan Premier League side FC Tobol for 6 months. He debuted 8 days later in the matchday 19 against Irtysh Pavlodar playing as a starter and becoming protagonist of the match. In the 82nd minute after a cross from the right side, Llullaku did a header which was deflected into the goal by opponents defender Carlos Fonseca and this goal was enough for Tobol to take the away 0–1 victory. In December he was exhibited by FC Astana for the transfer.

He was returned to Astana following the end of the 2017 season and later on 15 January 2018 he announced via his Instagram profile to have departed from Astana.

== International career ==
In April 2013, FSHF has been reported to have an interest in Llullaku representing Albania and asked him to apply for an Albanian passport (citizenship). On 24 May 2013, Llullaku received the Albanian citizenship among 4 fellow Albanian international players, Jurgen Gjasula, Ilir Berisha, Amir Abrashi and Vullnet Basha.

He received the first call-up from the national team coach Gianni De Biasi who declared that due to the absence of Edmond Kapllani, he had decided to call-up Llullaku to replace him for the match against Norway on 7 June 2013 and this due to his both-wings playing ability. Llullaku was an unused substitute for the entire match as he remained on the bench.

In October 2016, after a three years absence, following a series of good performances with Gaz Metan Mediaș, Llullaku was called up again from De Biasi for the 2018 FIFA World Cup qualification matches against Liechtenstein and Spain. He made his senior debut on 6 October by playing as a starter in the match against Liechtenstein which finished a 2–0 away win, as Albania took the lead of Group G with six points.

== Career statistics ==
=== Club ===
As of 11 May 2024

Appearances and goals by club, season and competition
Club	Season	League			National cup (Note: Includes Coppa Italia Serie D, Cupa României, Kazakhstan Cup, Belarusian Cup)		Europe		Other		Total	
Club	Season	Division	Apps	Goals	Apps	Goals	Apps	Goals	Apps	Goals	Apps	Goals
Conegliano	2005–06	Eccellenza	18	3	—		—		—		18	3
Sacilese	2006–07	Serie D	31	8	—		—		—		31	8
Sacilese	2009–10	Lega Pro Seconda Divisione	—		—		—		—		—	
Sacilese	Total		31	8	0	0	0	0	0	0	31	8
Südtirol (loan)	2007–08	Serie C2	12	0	—		—		—		12	0
Domegliara (loan)	2008–09	Serie D	33	11	—		—		—		33	11
Tamai	2010–11	Serie D	33	22	—		—		—		33	22
SandonàJesolo	2011–12	Serie D	30	13	3	1	—		—		33	14
Gaz Metan Mediaș	2012–13	Liga I	20	5	2	0	—		—		22	5
Gaz Metan Mediaș	2013–14	Liga I	28	1	2	2	—		—		30	3
Gaz Metan Mediaș	2014–15	Liga I	30	8	1	0	—		1 (Note: Appearance in Cupa Ligii)	32	8	
Gaz Metan Mediaș	2015–16	Liga II	15	3	0	0	—		—		15	3
Gaz Metan Mediaș	2016–17	Liga I	20	16	1	0	—		—		21	16
Gaz Metan Mediaș	Total		113	33	6	2	0	0	1	0	120	35
CSMS Iași	2015–16	Liga I	14	0	—		—		—		14	0
Astana	2017	Kazakhstan Premier League	16	1	1	0	—		1 (Note: Appearance in Kazakhstan Super Cup)	0	18	1
Tobol (loan)	2017	Kazakhstan Premier League	13	0	—		—		—		13	0
Virtus Entella	2017–18	Serie B	4	0	—		—		0	0	4	0
Astra Giurgiu	2018–19	Liga I	34	7	5	2	—		—		39	9
Shakhtyor Soligorsk	2019	Belarusian Premier League	6	1	—		0	0	—		6	1
Shakhtyor Soligorsk	2020	Belarusian Premier League	7	0	2	0	—		1 (Note: Appearance in Belarusian Super Cup)	0	10	0
Shakhtyor Soligorsk	Total		13	1	2	0	0	0	1	0	16	1
Concordia Chiajna	2020–21	Liga II	25	7	2	0	—		—		27	7
Concordia Chiajna	2021–22	Liga II	21	5	2	0	—		2	0	25	5
Concordia Chiajna	2022–23	Liga II	13	2	1	0	—		—		14	2
Concordia Chiajna	Total		59	14	5	0	0	0	2	0	66	14
Cjarlins Muzane	2022–23	Serie D	14	1	—		—		—		14	1
Ceahlăul Piatra Neamț	2023–24	Liga II	24	5	1	0	—		—		25	5
Career total			461	119	23	5	0	0	5	0	489	124

=== International ===
Appearances and goals by national team and year
National team	Year	Apps	Goals
Albania	2016	2	0
Albania	2017	4	0
Total		6	0

== Honours ==
Astana

- Kazakhstan Super Cup runner-up: 2017

Astra Giurgiu

- Cupa României runner-up: 2018–19

Shakhtyor Soligorsk

- Belarusian Super Cup runner-up: 2020

Individual

- Liga I top scorer: 2016–17
