= Ledian Memushaj =

Albanian football manager and player (born 1986)

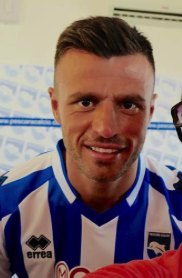
- Memushaj with Pescara in 2016

Personal information
- Date of birth: 7 December 1986 (age 39)
- Place of birth: Vlorë, PSR Albania
- Height: 1.75 m (5 ft 9 in)
- Position: Central midfielder

Team information
- Current team: Team Altamura (head coach)

Youth career
- 2003–2006: Sarzanese

Senior career*
| Years | Team | Apps | (Gls) |
| 2003–2008 | Sarzanese | 84 | (10) |
| 2008–2009 | Valle d'Aosta | 34 | (3) |
| 2009–2010 | Paganese | 28 | (1) |
| 2010–2011 | Chievo Verona | 0 | (0) |
| 2011 | → Portogruaro (loan) | 15 | (2) |
| 2011–2012 | Carpi | 31 | (8) |
| 2012–2014 | Lecce | 29 | (3) |
| 2013–2014 | → Carpi (loan) | 33 | (8) |
| 2014–2022 | Pescara | 214 | (27) |
| 2017–2018 | → Benevento (loan) | 17 | (0) |
| Total | | 485 | (62) |

International career
| 2010–2021 | Albania | 44 | (1) |

Managerial career
- 2022–2023: Pescara U19
- 2023: Dinamo City (assistant)
- 2024: Pescara U19
- 2025–2026: AC Leon
- 2026–: Team Altamura
- * Club domestic league appearances and goals

Ledian Memushaj (born 7 December 1986) is an Albanian professional football coach and a former central midfielder. He is the head coach of Serie C Group C club Team Altamura.

== Club career ==
=== Early career ===
Memushaj joined Sarzanese when he was 17 years old. He helped the team finish second in Eccellenza Liguria in 2006 and gain promotion to Serie D. In the summer of 2008, he moved to fellow Serie D side Valle d'Aosta, where he played 34 games and scored 3 goals. On 10 September 2009, he signed for Paganese to play in the Lega Pro Prima Divisione after a trial.

=== Chievo and Portogruaro (loan) ===
On 21 June 2010, he was signed by Serie A side Chievo Verona on a free transfer. He was loaned out to Serie B side Portogruaro on 29 January 2011.

=== Lecce ===
On 27 July 2012, Memushaj left Carpi and moved to Serie B side Lecce on a three-year contract. However, before he even kicked a ball for his new club, they were relegated to the Lega Pro Prima Divisione after being expelled from Serie B for their part in the Calcio Scommesse scandal.

Memushaj scored his first goal for Lecce on 3 September 2012 in a 3–2 victory against Cremonese. He scored his team's 3rd goal of the match in the 31st minute with a shot from 20 meters out. On 23 September 2012, he scored Lecce's third goal in its 1–3 victory at Treviso, which took them to the top of the 2012–13 Lega Pro Prima Divisione League table.

==== Loan to Carpi ====
On 27 July 2013, Carpi announced that they had signed Memushaj on loan from Lecce for the 2013–14 season of Serie B. This transfer happened shortly after Carpi signed the fellow Albania national team player, Edgar Çani. This was his second spell with Carpi.

He became a key player for Carpi and made crucial contributions each week, scoring regularly. His first goal during this spell at Carpi came in extra time of the 0–1 away victory against Reggina on 28 September 2013. On 26 October 2013, he scored a goal against Latina from the penalty spot at the start of the second half to give his team a 1–1 draw. On 21 December 2013, he scored from the penalty spot in the 72nd minute to give his team a narrow 1–0 victory against Palermo. This victory resulted in Palermo surrendering first place to Empoli. On 26 December 2013 he scored an equaliser at Virtus Lanciano before two further goals from teammates left Carpi three points away from the play-off zone for promotion to Serie A. He started 2014 with a goal to continue his excellent form from the first half of the season. He scored in the 20th minute of the first half against Ternana at home on 25 January 2014, but this was not enough to avoid defeat. It was his fifth goal of the season and despite this defeat, his team were only three points away from the play-off zone for promotion.

In the 2013–14 season, Memushaj played in total 33 Serie B matches in where he scored 8 goals. He also played in a single match for the 2013–14 Coppa Italia.

On 6 May 2014, Memushaj tore a right knee ligament in a match against Pescara and had to undergo surgery. He was unable to play for 6 months.

==== Return to Lecce ====
Carpi did not accept the request of Lecce to buy Memushaj for a fee of €400,000, so he returned to Lecce.

=== Pescara ===
On 1 September 2014 Memushaj signed for the Serie B club Pescara on 1-year contract.

Due to the injury he suffered in May 2014, he missed Pescara's first 7 matches of the 2014–15 Serie B season. He made it his debut on 12 October 2014 by coming on as a substitute for Gabriel Appelt Pires in the 87th minute against Crotone; Pescara won the match, 1–4. He was an unused substitute for the next week match on 17 October 2014 against Vicenza (1–1), but a week later Memushaj started in the match against his previous team Carpi, but the match finished as a bad loss with a 0–5 result. A week later, Memushaj scored his first goal for Pescara in a 1–1 draw against Bari. On 27 December 2015, Memushaj scored the winning goal in the game against U.S. Latina Calcio, but was subsequently sent off the pitch after kicking a microphone on the sidelines as part of his goal celebration.

=== Benevento ===
On 28 August 2017, Memushaj was signed on loan with Serie A club Benevento until the end of the 2017–18 season with a purchase obligation at the end of loan.

== International career ==
Memushaj was called for the first time to the Albania national team in November 2010 by manager Josip Kuže for a friendly against Macedonia. He made his international debut during the match at Qemal Stafa Stadium, replacing Klodian Duro in the second half as the match ended in a goalless draw. He returned on the team on 9 February 2011 for their next friendly against Slovenia, earning his second cap in the process, again as a substitute, as Albania was defeated 1–2.

In November 2013, after a long absence, Memushaj returned to the team with De Biasi as their manager for the friendly match against Belarus following the end of 2014 FIFA World Cup qualifiers. He was again used as a substitute in place of Valdet Rama in another scoreless draw.

=== UEFA Euro 2016 campaign ===
Memushaj missed the first two UEFA Euro 2016 qualifiers matches against Portugal and Denmark due to an injury suffered in May 2014 while representing Carpi, an injury which sidelined him for 6 months. He also missed the notorious match against Serbia in October 2014. As soon as he was declared fit, he was called up for the friendlies against France and Italy in November 2014. He played his first match as a starter against France as Albania earned a historic 1–1 draw at Roazhon Park. He also featured as starter in Albania's first ever match against Italy, missing an opportunity to score in the first half as Albania slumped into a 1–0 away defeat.

Memushaj continued to be part of Albania in their historic UEFA Euro 2016 qualifying campaign. In the final decisive match against Armenia, he assisted the second goal via a set piece as Albania won 3–0 to secure a spot at UEFA Euro 2016, its first ever appearance at a major men's football tournament. On 21 May 2016, he was named in Albania's preliminary 27-man squad for UEFA Euro 2016, and in Albania's final 23-man UEFA Euro 2016 squad on 31 May.

In the tournament, he did not play in the Albania's first Group A match against Switzerland, which finished in a 0–1 loss. However, he returned to the lineup in the second match against hosts France, hitting the post before Albania conceded two goals in the last minutes. In the final match against Romania, he assisted Armando Sadiku's header for the only goal of the match, helping earn Albania's first win at a major men's football tournament and beating Romania for the first time since 1948. Albania was eliminated from the tournament after finishing third in its group with three points and a goal difference of –2, ranking last among third-placed teams.

=== 2018 FIFA World Cup campaign ===
Memushaj scored his first international goal on 11 June 2017 in the 2018 FIFA World Cup qualification match against Israel, netting the third in an eventual 3–0 away win.

== Post-playing career ==
Memushaj retired from playing at the end of the 2021–22 season and he was appointed as head coach of the Under-19 squad of Pescara until June 2023. In August 2023, he was appointed as assistant coach in Dinamo City under Luigi di Biagio, until October 2023.

== Personal life ==
He and his family migrated to Italy in 1997 due to civil war in Albania.

Following Albania's historic participation at UEFA Euro 2016, Memushaj was among the members of the national team who were issued diplomatic passports by the Albanian government in recognition of their achievement.

== Career statistics ==
=== Club ===
As of 8 September 2020

Club statistics
| Club | Season | League | | | Cup | | Europe (Note: Including continental competitions, such as UEFA Champions League and UEFA Europa League) | | Other | | Total | |
| Club | Season | Division | Apps | Goals | Apps | Goals | Apps | Goals | Apps | Goals | Apps | Goals |
|---|---|---|---|---|---|---|---|---|---|---|---|---|
| Sarzanese | 2003–04 | Eccellenza Liguria | 2 | 0 | — | | — | | — | | 2 | 0 |
| Sarzanese | 2004–05 | Eccellenza Liguria | 29 | 2 | — | | — | | — | | 29 | 2 |
| Sarzanese | 2005–06 | Eccellenza Liguria | 0 | 0 | — | | — | | — | | 0 | 0 |
| Sarzanese | 2006–07 | Serie D | 31 | 3 | — | | — | | — | | 31 | 3 |
| Sarzanese | 2007–08 | Serie D | 22 | 5 | — | | — | | — | | 22 | 5 |
| Sarzanese | Total | | 84 | 10 | — | | — | | — | | 84 | 10 |
| Valle d'Aosta | 2008–09 | Serie D | 34 | 3 | — | | — | | — | | 34 | 3 |
| Paganese | 2009–10 | Lega Pro Prima Divisione | 28 | 1 | — | | — | | 2 (Note: All appearance(s) in play-out) | 0 | 30 | 1 |
| Chievo Verona | 2010–11 | Serie A | 0 | 0 | 3 | 0 | — | | — | | 3 | 0 |
| Portogruaro | 2010–11 | Serie B | 15 | 2 | — | | — | | — | | 15 | 2 |
| Carpi | 2011–12 | Lega Pro Prima Divisione | 31 | 8 | 2 | 1 | — | | 4 (Note: All appearance(s) in play-off) | 0 | 37 | 9 |
| Lecce | 2012–13 | Lega Pro Prima Divisione | 29 | 3 | 2 | 0 | — | | 3 | 0 | 34 | 3 |
| Carpi | 2013–14 | Serie B | 33 | 8 | 1 | 0 | — | | — | | 34 | 8 |
| Pescara | 2014–15 | Serie B | 30 | 6 | 1 | 0 | — | | 5 | 1 | 36 | 7 |
| Pescara | 2015–16 | Serie B | 30 | 11 | 1 | 0 | — | | 2 | 0 | 33 | 11 |
| Pescara | 2016–17 | Serie A | 36 | 1 | 2 | 0 | — | | — | | 38 | 1 |
| Pescara | 2018–19 | Serie B | 36 | 2 | 2 | 0 | — | | — | | 38 | 2 |
| Pescara | 2019–20 | Serie B | 37 | 4 | 2 | 0 | — | | — | | 39 | 4 |
| Pescara | Total | | 169 | 24 | 8 | 0 | — | | 7 | 1 | 184 | 25 |
| Benevento (loan) | 2017–18 | Serie A | 17 | 0 | — | | — | | — | | 17 | 0 |
| Career total | | | 440 | 59 | 16 | 1 | — | | 14 | 1 | 470 | 61 |

=== International ===
As of 27 September 2020

Appearances and goals by national team and year
| National team | Year | Apps | Goals |
|---|---|---|---|
| Albania | 2010 | 1 | 0 |
| Albania | 2011 | 1 | 0 |
| Albania | 2012 | 1 | 0 |
| Albania | 2013 | 1 | 0 |
| Albania | 2014 | 3 | 0 |
| Albania | 2015 | 5 | 0 |
| Albania | 2016 | 8 | 0 |
| Albania | 2017 | 9 | 1 |
| Albania | 2018 | 5 | 0 |
| Albania | 2019 | 6 | 0 |
| Total | | 40 | 1 |

As of 27 September 2020
Scores and results list Albania's goal tally first, score column indicates score after each Memushaj goal.

List of international goals scored by Ledian Memushaj
| No. | Date | Venue | Opponent | Score | Result | Competition |
|---|---|---|---|---|---|---|
| 1. | 11 June 2017 | Sammy Ofer Stadium, Haifa, Israel | Israel | 3–0 | 3–0 | 2018 FIFA World Cup qualification |
