= Loris Boni =

Italian footballer and coach

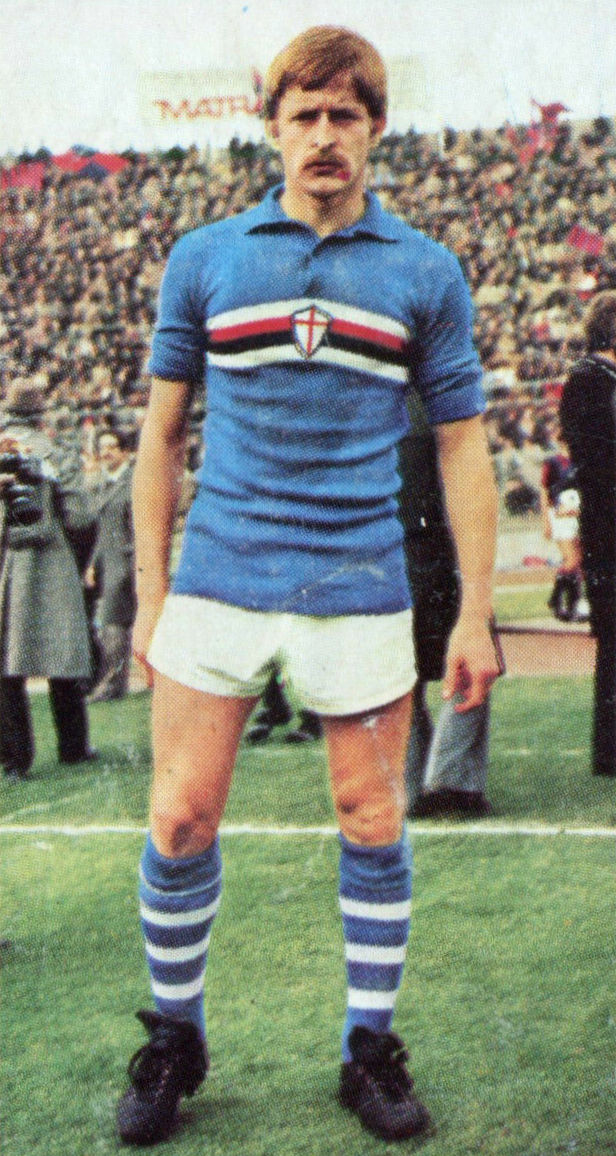
- Boni with Sampdoria in 1974

Personal information
- Date of birth: 14 January 1953 (age 73)
- Place of birth: Remedello, Italy
- Height: 1.76 m (5 ft 9 1/2 in)
- Position: Midfielder

Senior career*
Years	Team	Apps	(Gls)
1969–1971	Solbiatese	37	(0)
1971–1975	Sampdoria	99	(5)
1975–1979	Roma	80	(0)
1979–1981	Pescara	46	(0)
1981–1983	Cremonese	40	(1)
1983–1984	Novara	21	(5)
1984–1987	Legnano	77	(0)
1987–1990	Fanfulla		

International career
1972–1977	Italy U-21	5	(0)

Managerial career
- 1991–1992: Fanfulla
- 1992–1993: Seregno
- 1993–1994: Casalese
- 1994–1996: Fidenza
- 1996–1997: Legnago Salus
- 1997–1998: Sassuolo
- 1998–2000: Montichiari
- 2000–2001: Mantova
- 2001–2006: Cologna Veneta
- 2006–2007: Piovese
- 2007–2008: Imperia
- 2008–2009: Fanfulla
- * Club domestic league appearances and goals

Loris Boni (born 14 January 1953 in Remedello, Province of Brescia) is an Italian professional football coach and a former player. A midfielder, he made 400 appearances in the Italian professional leagues, including more than 200 in Serie A.

After a couple of seasons in the third-tier Serie C, he made his debut in Serie A for Sampdoria a couple of months before his 19th birthday. He had an impressive rookie season for such a young player, becoming a first-team regular and scoring a memorable goal in a 4–4 draw against Internazionale. Next season, he was instrumental to the victory away against Torino that helped Sampdoria to avoid relegation.

Soon, he moved to Roma, but was not able to maintain high level of play he displayed with Sampdoria. He did not score any league goals during his four seasons with Roma. However, he scored in an important 1975–76 UEFA Cup game that Roma won 2–0 against Öster; Boni played all six Roma games in that tournament.

Overall, he played nine seasons in Serie A (202 games, five goals).

After retirement as a player, he worked as a coach for lower league teams.
