= Garavano =

Garavano is a surname. Notable people with the surname include:

- Germán Garavano (born 1969), Argentine lawyer and politician
- Gonzalo Garavano (born 1982), Argentine footballer
- Matías Garavano (born 1984), Argentine footballer
