= Lamberto Zauli =

Italian footballer and coach (born 1971)

Personal information
- Date of birth: 19 July 1971 (age 55)
- Place of birth: Rome, Italy
- Height: 1.88 m (6 ft 2 in)
- Position: Attacking midfielder

Youth career
- Grosseto
- Modena

Senior career*
Years	Team	Apps	(Gls)
1988–1990	Modena	3	(1)
1990–1991	Centese	23	(1)
1991–1992	Fano	28	(4)
1992	Modena	2	(0)
1992–1993	Ravenna	9	(1)
1993–1994	Crevalcore	23	(4)
1994–1997	Ravenna	88	(16)
1997–2001	Vicenza	117	(15)
2001–2002	Bologna	27	(6)
2002–2005	Palermo	69	(14)
2005	Sampdoria	8	(0)
2006–2007	Bologna	49	(6)
2007–2008	Cremonese	24	(4)
2008–2009	Bellaria	21	(1)

Managerial career
- 2009–2010: Bellaria
- 2010–2011: Fano
- 2012: Reggiana
- 2013: Reggiana
- 2014: Real Vicenza
- 2014: Pordenone
- 2015–2016: Santarcangelo
- 2016: Teramo
- 2016–2017: Teramo
- 2017–2019: Empoli U19
- 2019–2020: Juventus U19
- 2020–2022: Juventus U23
- 2022: Südtirol
- 2023–2024: Crotone
- 2024: Crotone
- 2024–2025: Perugia
- * Club domestic league appearances and goals

Lamberto Zauli (born 19 July 1971) is an Italian professional football coach and former player. As a player, he spent his career as an attacking midfielder but was also capable of playing on the left wing on occasion.

== Club career ==
Born in Rome, Lamberto grew up in Grosseto, playing in the youth squad of U.S. Grosseto, the same club as his father, Lorenzo. His professional career began in the youth squad of Modena during the 1989–90 season down in Serie C1. He moved into the Serie C2 division with Centese, where he notched up over 20 games with the club during the only season he was with them.

Marche club Fano then signed Zauli, but, despite his potential, he only played one season for them: returning to Modena, who were now in Serie B. He soon moved to Ravenna Calcio, being also loaned to Crevalcore after one season. In 1994, he made his return to Ravenna, in Serie C1, where they gained promotion into Serie B; this brought Zauli's talents to the attention of Serie A sides.

From 1997 until 2001, Zauli played with Vicenza Calcio; in his first season with the club, he even scored three goals in the 1997–98 edition of the UEFA Cup Winners' Cup competition, where Vicenza reached the semi-finals, losing out to eventual champions Chelsea F.C.; the club's performances during this time earned the team the nickname "Real Vicenza", a reference to Real Madrid. After the club's relegation, he helped Vicenza regain Serie A promotion in 2000, winning the Serie B title. After experiencing a second relegation in 2001, however, Zauli was transferred to Bologna for a season. He then moved on to Palermo from 2002 till 2005, in what proved to be one of the most prosperous times in the club's history, with the rosanero winning the Serie B in 2004 title to rise from Serie B to Serie A, and subsequently qualifying for the European stage.

After his Sicilian experience, Zauli was transferred to Sampdoria for the start of the 2005–06 season. After problems fitting in at the Genoa based club, Zauli returned to Bologna in January 2006. He then joined Cremonese for the 2007–08 season with little success and ended his playing career with Lega Pro Seconda Divisione club Bellaria in 2008–09.

== Managerial career ==
In June 2009, it was revealed that Bellaria had appointed Zauli as head coach, thus allowing him to stay on what proved to have been his final team as a player.

He was sacked in April 2010 following a string of unimpressive results that left Bellaria deep into the relegation playoff zone.

On 29 June 2010 he was announced as new head coach of Fano in Lega Pro Seconda Divisione.

On 3 January 2012, he was announced as the new head coach of Reggiana, in Lega Pro Prima Divisione.

Zauli was successively appointed at the helm of the newly-promoted Lega Pro club Pordenone for the 2014–15 season but was dismissed on 23 September 2014 due to poor results.

Following an experience as manager of the Juventus Primavera, on 22 August 2020, Zauli was appointed head coach of Serie C club Juventus U23, the reserve team of Juventus. On 16 July 2021, Zauli extended his contract for Juventus U23. On 13 June 2022, he left Juventus U23 to join Serie B side Südtirol. He however left the club by mutual consent on 9 August 2022, a week before the start of the season, due to the poor results achieved.

On 13 January 2023, Zauli signed a contract with Serie C club Crotone until the end of the season with an option to extend. He was dismissed on 19 February 2024 due to negative results, only to be reappointed at the helm of the team just a month later on 21 March.

On 28 October 2024, after having departed Crotone by the end of the 2023–24 season, Zauli was hired as the new head coach of Serie C club Perugia. He was dismissed on 19 February 2025 after a string of negative results.

== Style of play ==
Tall, strong and capable as an attacking midfielder or winger, Zauli was a creative player who, in addition to his physical attributes, possesses excellent technique and dribbling skills. He was known in particular for his goalscoring from midfield due to his striking ability from outside the area and his ability on free-kicks. His talent, control, stature, and performances, in particular in the Italian second division, earned him the nickname: "The Zidane of Serie B." During his time with Vicenza, under the manager Francesco Guidolin, he was also deployed as a second striker.

== Honours ==
=== Club ===
Vicenza

- Serie B: 1999–2000

Palermo

- Serie B: 2003–04
