= Corapi =

Corapi is an Italian surname. Notable people with the surname include:

- Francesco Corapi (born 1985), Italian footballer
- John Corapi (born 1947), American Roman Catholic priest
