= Umberto Del Core =

Italian footballer

Personal information
- Full name: Umberto Del Core
- Date of birth: November 20, 1979 (age 46)
- Place of birth: Bari, Italy
- Height: 1.77 m (5 ft 10 in)
- Position: Striker

Senior career*
| Years | Team | Apps | (Gls) |
| 1996–1997 | Bisceglie | 5 | (0) |
| 1997–1998 | Altamura | 19 | (3) |
| 1998–1999 | Renato Curi | 29 | (8) |
| 1999–2001 | Tricase | 53 | (19) |
| 2001 | Ancona | 0 | (0) |
| 2001 | → Taranto (loan) | 2 | (0) |
| 2002–2004 | Foggia | 77 | (36) |
| 2004–2005 | Arezzo | 13 | (0) |
| 2005–2007 | Catania | 41 | (4) |
| 2007 | → Cesena (loan) | 19 | (1) |
| 2007–2009 | Foggia | 42 | (11) |
| 2009–2010 | Perugia | 36 | (13) |
| 2010–2012 | Andria BAT | 46 | (15) |
| 2012–2013 | Martina | 9 | (1) |
| 2013–2014 | Fano | 14 | (4) |
| 2014 | Bisceglie | 7 | (1) |
| 2014 | Miramare | ? | (15) |
| 2015–2018 | Team Altamura | | |
- * Club domestic league appearances and goals

Umberto Del Core (born 20 November 1979) is an Italian former professional footballer who played as a striker

== Career ==
Del Core started his career at CND for Bisceglie, Altamura and Renato Curi. He then played for Tricase of Serie C2, before spotted by Ancona of Serie B in summer 2001. But he moved to Taranto on loan, and sold to Foggia in January 2002.

He won promotion with Foggia in summer 2003. A year later joined Arezzo. He moved again in summer 2005, this time to Catania. He followed Catania promotion to Serie A, where he made 11 appearances, before moved back to Serie B for Cesena in January 2007.

In summer 2007, he moved back to former club Foggia. In January 2009, he played for Perugia.

The following years, Del Core played for various clubs in the lower leagues, retiring from football as part of Team Altamura in 2018.

== Personal life ==
In March 2005, Del Core and four others from Bari related to the Capriati crime family were arrested on charges of extortion of former Foggia president Antonio Vitale. A month later he was placed under house arrest.

In 2019, he was suspended for breaching betting rules regarding illegal bets in the city of Bari.
