= Michele Russo =

Italian footballer

Personal information
- Date of birth: 31 August 1986 (age 40)
- Place of birth: Genoa, Italy
- Height: 1.86 m (6 ft 1 in)
- Position: Defender

Senior career*
Years	Team	Apps	(Gls)
2003–2005	Lavagnese	60	(8)
2006	Cervia	19	(3)
2006–2009	Lavagnese	100	(9)
2009–2010	Carrarese	29	(0)
2010–2011	Lavagnese	30	(2)
2011–2015	Virtus Entella	120	(15)
2015–2016	Cremonese	28	(0)
2016–2018	Padova	55	(7)
2018–2019	Robur Siena	15	(3)
2019–2021	Ternana	47	(3)
2021-	Livorno Calcio		
- * Club domestic league appearances and goals as of 19 December 2021

Michele Russo (born 31 August 1986), is an Italian footballer who plays as a defender. He had previously played for Lavagnese, Cervia and Carrarese Calcio.

== Club career ==
On 31 January 2019, he signed a 1.5-year contract with Ternana. On 28 December 2021, his contract with Ternana was terminated by mutual consent.
