= Michele Florindo =

Italian footballer and manager

Personal information
- Full name: Michele Florindo
- Date of birth: May 2, 1980 (age 46)
- Place of birth: Rovigo, Italy
- Height: 1.90 m (6 ft 3 in)
- Position: Defender

Team information
- Current team: Calvina (Manager)

Senior career*
Years	Team	Apps	(Gls)
1997–2002	Adriese	104	(0)
2002–2005	Padova	33	(0)
2003–2004	→ L'Aquila (loan)	27	(0)
2005–2006	Spezia	12	(0)
2006–2008	San Marino	56	(2)
2008–2009	Castellana	6	(0)
2009–2010	Casertana	28	(2)
2010	Pisticci	14	(1)
2010–2011	Sottomarina	?	(2)
2011	Pordenone	0	(0)
2011–2012	Adriese	?	(0)
2012–2014	Piovese	0	(0)

Managerial career
- 2014–2016: Piovese
- 2016–2018: Este
- 2018–2019: Adriese
- 2019–: Calvina
- * Club domestic league appearances and goals

Michele Florindo (born 2 May 1980 in Rovigo, Italy) is an Italian football manager and former player, currently in charge as head coach of Calvina.

== Coaching career ==
On 7 October 2019, he was hired by Serie D club Calvina.
