= Gianluca Toscano =

Italian footballer

Personal information
- Date of birth: 13 January 1984 (age 42)
- Place of birth: Rome, Italy
- Height: 1.91 m (6 ft 3 in)
- Position: Forward

Team information
- Current team: Castrense

Senior career*
Years	Team	Apps	(Gls)
2002–2003	Sora	2	(0)
2003	Ascoli	0	(0)
2003–2004	Milan	0	(4)
2004	Latina	5	(0)
2004–2005	Astrea	31	(14)
2005	Cassino	2	(1)
2005–2006	Astrea	14	(3)
2006–2007	Lanciano	0	(0)
2007	Guidonia	6	(0)
2007–2008	Pisoniano (amateur)	28	(21)
2008	Pisa	0	(0)
2008–2009	Tor Tre Teste (amateur)	32	(30)
2009	Grosseto	0	(0)
2009	Fidene (amateur)	10	(2)
2009–2010	Ostia Mare (amateur)	19	(16)
2010–2011	Pisoniano (amateur)		(26)
2011–2012	Ostia Mare (amateur)		(24)
2012–2013	Albalonga (amateur)		(26)
2013–2014	Castrense (amateur)		
Total		280	(213)
- * Club domestic league appearances and goals

Gianluca Toscano (born 13 January 1984) is a former Italian professional footballer who plays for Castrense in Eccellenza Lazio (amateur league).

== Biography ==
=== Professional career ===
Born in Rome, Lazio, Toscano started his professional career with Serie C1 club Sora. In January 2003 he was signed by Ascoli's youth team. In 2003–04 season, he joined A.C. Milan's Primavera team. In January 2004 he was transferred to Serie C2 club Latina.

=== Non-professional ===
In 2004, he left for Serie D club Astrea, then left for Cassino. In 2006, he signed a professional contract with Lanciano and released in 2007 due to a serious injury. In 2007–08 season, he was signed by Guidonia then left for Eccellenza Lazio team Pisoniano. In May 2008 he was signed by Serie B team Pisa but released again in August. in 2008–09 season he left for Tor Tre Teste. He scored 30 goals in Eccellenza Lazio as topscorer of Lazio region. In July 2009 he was signed by another Serie B team Grosseto but soon released again. He was offered no.90 shirt for Grosseto. He then left for Fidene and Ostia Mare in December 2009.

In July 2010 he joined Pisoniano.

From June 2013 plays for Castrense
