= Gonzalo Garavano =

Argentine footballer

Personal information
- Date of birth: 26 November 1982 (age 43)
- Place of birth: Buenos Aires, Argentina
- Height: 1.90 m (6 ft 3 in)
- Position: Forward

Senior career*
Years	Team	Apps	(Gls)
2000–2001	Fútbol San Nicolás	–	(–)
2001–2002	Paolana	–	(–)
2003	Newell's Old Boys	0	(0)
2003–2004	Ragusa	–	(–)
2004–2005	Paolana	–	(–)
2005	Alianza	0	(0)
2006	Mineros de Guayana	4	(1)
2006	Coquimbo Unido	15	(2)
2007	Deportivo Italia	15	(4)
2007–2008	Rampla Juniors	15	(5)
2008–2009	Estrela Amadora	2	(0)
2009	→ Portimonense (loan)	8	(4)
2009–2010	Portimonense	18	(5)
2010	Cerro Reyes	14	(2)
2011	Orihuela	9	(1)
2011	Atlético Tucumán	7	(0)
2012	Nacional Potosí	15	(8)
2012–2013	Olmedo	15	(4)
2014	Perlis FA	–	(–)
2014–2015	Sarmiento de Resistencia	24	(11)
2016	La Emilia	–	(–)
2016	Concepción	12	(7)
2017	Chaco For Ever	10	(4)
2017–2018	Gimnasia y Tiro	14	(1)
2018–2019	Deportivo Roca	17	(3)
2019–2020	La Emilia	–	(–)
2020	Empalme Central	–	(–)
Total		214	(62)
- * Club domestic league appearances and goals

Gonzalo Garavano (born 26 November 1982) is an Argentine former professional footballer who played as a forward.

He played for Olmedo in the Ecuadorian Serie A. Garavano has played for Estrela da Amadora in Portugal. Garavano had a spell in the lower leagues of Italian football with U.S. Ragusa and U.S. Paolana. He has also played for Alianza F.C. in El Salvador, AC Mineros de Guayana in Venezuela, Coquimbo Unido in Chile, Nacional Potosi in Bolivia, and Perlis FA in the Malaysia Premier League.

== Personal life ==
Garavano was born in Buenos Aires. He is the older brother of the also professional footballer Matías Garavano, with whom he coincided in Rampla Juniors and Empalme Central.
