= Francesco Corapi =

Italian footballer (born 1985)

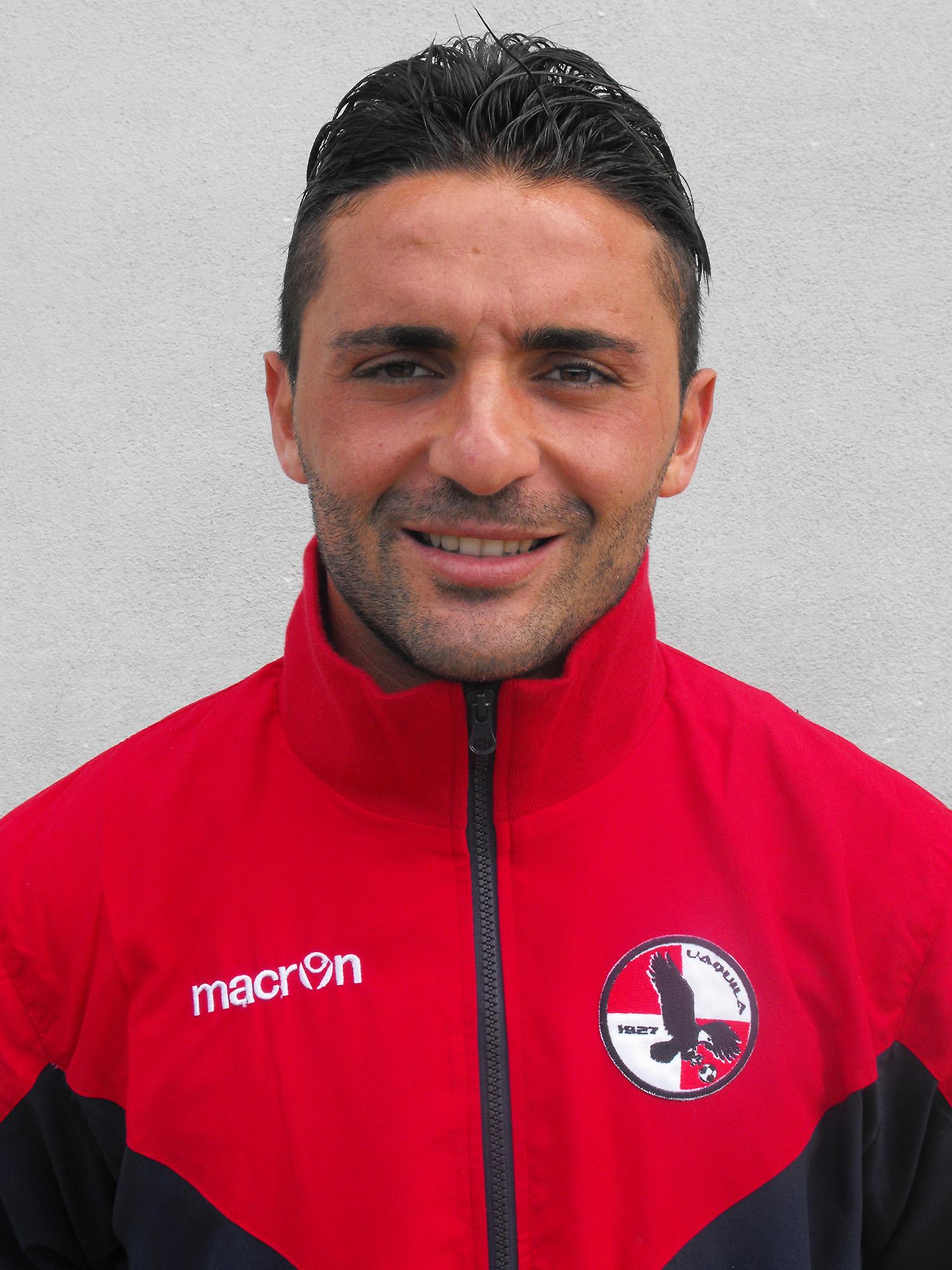

Personal information
- Date of birth: 22 December 1985 (age 40)
- Place of birth: Catanzaro, Italy
- Height: 1.65 m (5 ft 5 in)
- Position: Midfielder

Youth career
- –2005: Catanzaro

Senior career*
Years	Team	Apps	(Gls)
2005	Catanzaro	2	(0)
2005–2006	Sapri	31	(4)
2006–2007	Gela	30	(3)
2007–2008	Vibonese	15	(2)
2008	Benevento	0	(0)
2008–2011	Catanzaro	54	(5)
2011	Siracusa	14	(0)
2011–2012	Vibonese	32	(3)
2012–2013	Nocerina	27	(2)
2013–2015	L'Aquila	62	(6)
2015–2018	Parma	82	(13)
2018–2020	Trapani	59	(6)
2020–2021	Catanzaro	38	(1)
2021–2022	Lamezia Terme	27	(1)
2022	ASD Cutro 1965		
2022–2023	Paolana		
Total		467	(46)

Managerial career
- 2024–2025: Val Gallico Calcio
- 2025: Paternò
- 2025–: Paolana
- * Club domestic league appearances and goals

Francesco Corapi (born 22 December 1985) is an Italian football coach and former footballer who is currently as a head coach for Paolana.

== Biography ==
Born in Catanzaro, Calabria, Corapi started his career at U.S. Catanzaro. He played twice in the last two rounds of 2004–05 Serie B.

In 2005 Corapi left for Serie D club Sapri (Italian fifth division until 2014). In 2006, he was signed by Serie C2 club Gela. In August 2007 he joined fellow fourth division club Vibonese. In January 2008 he left for Benevento.

=== Catanzaro return ===
In 2008 Corapi returned to hometown for F.C. Catanzaro in co-ownership deal (which Catanzaro signed him outright from Benevento in June 2009). He spent 2 1/2 seasons in Lega Pro Seconda Divisione (ex- Serie C2) until January 2011, which he was signed by Siracusa of Lega Pro Prima Divisione.

Corapi signed a new 2-year contract worth €37,791.78 in gross annually in August 2010 (decreased from €74,000 in gross in 2009–10 season; €57,000 in gross in 2010–11 season in a contract signed in May 2010, but increased from actual receiving of Lega Pro minimum from 2008 to 3 May 2010 of €16,745 in net and €17,281 in net), the wage was increased to €96,314.72 in gross in the version that submitted to Lega Pro on 3 November 2010. The president of Lega Pro voided the second version of the contract due to financial difficulties of Catanzaro, on 30 November. Catanzaro bankrupted in June 2011.

=== Vibonese ===
In 2011 Corapi was re-signed by Vibonese. The club relegated to Serie D (amateur league) after losing the relegation "play-out" to Mantova.

=== Nocerina ===
On 14 July 2012 Corapi joined Italian third division club Nocerina. In February 2013 he was suspended 3 months due to contract issue with Catanzaro. His appeal was accepted by the Corte di Giustizia Federale (CGF) of Italian Football Federation (FIGC) on 7 March.

He was the starting midfielder in 4-3-3 formation in the promotion playoffs.

=== L'Aquila ===
On 21 August 2013 Corapi joined L'Aquila in 2-year contract.

=== Trapani ===
On 16 January 2020, he was released from his contract with Trapani by mutual consent.

=== Second return to Catanzaro ===
On 17 January 2020, he returned to Catanzaro once again and signed a 1.5-year contract.

=== Serie D ===
On 27 August 2021, he joined Lamezia Terme in Serie D.

== Honours ==
- Serie C2: Benevento (2008)
