= Paola, Calabria =

Paola Griko: Láura
- Comune
- Città di Paola
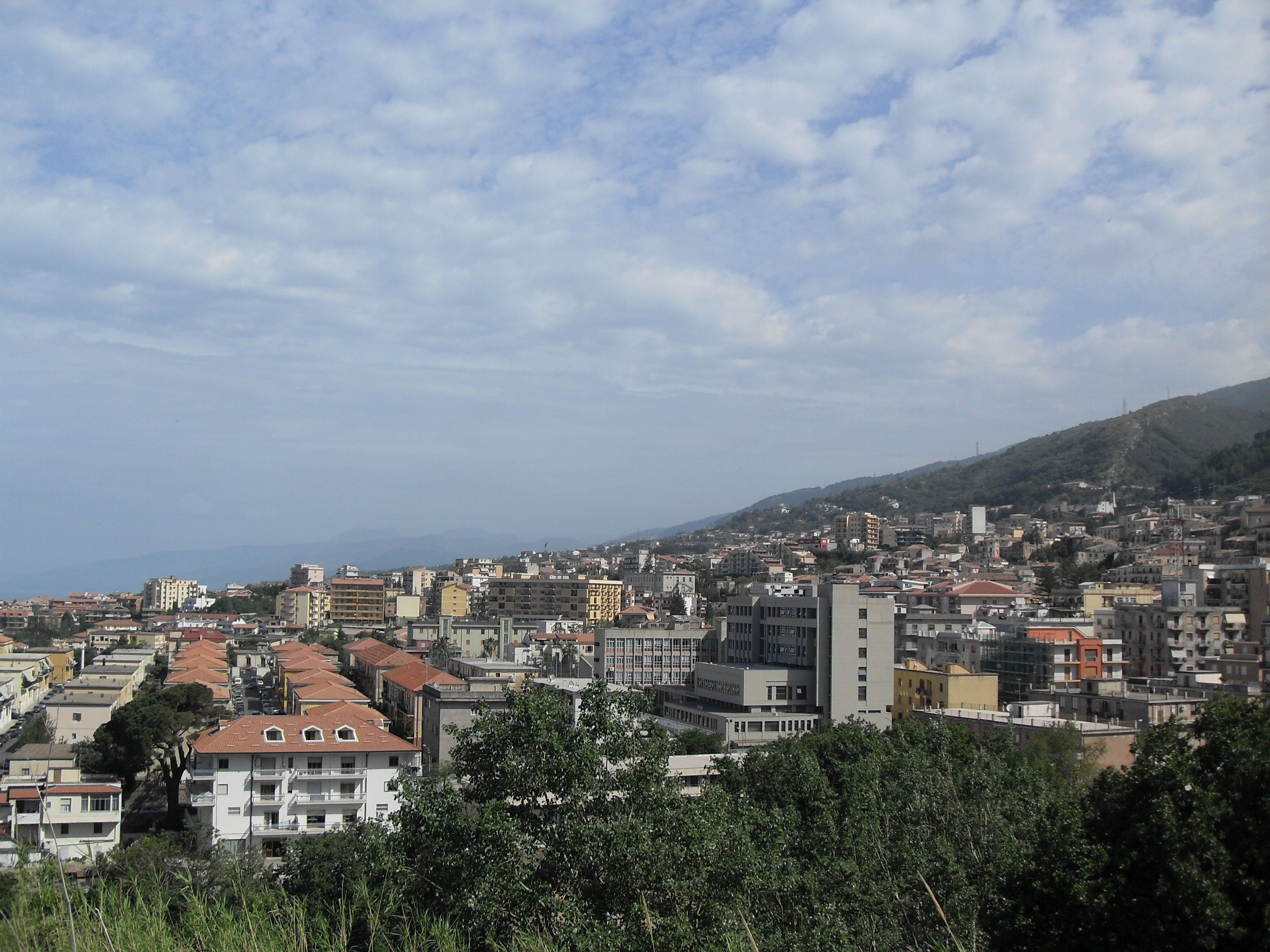
- Panoramic view

- Location within Italy Location within Calabria
- Coordinates: 39°22′N 16°2′E
- Country: Italy
- Region: Calabria
- Province: Cosenza (CS)

Government
  - Mayor: Roberto Perrotta

Area
  - Total: 42.88 km^{2} (16.56 sq mi)
- Elevation: 94 m (308 ft)

Population (31 December 2017)
  - Total: 15,716
  - Density: 366.5/km^{2} (949.3/sq mi)
- Demonym: Paolani
- Time zone: UTC+1 (CET)
  - Summer (DST): UTC+2 (CEST)
- Postal code: 87027
- Dialing code: 0982
- Patron saint: St. Francis of Paola
- Saint day: 2 April and 4 May
- Website: Official website

Paola (Calabrian: Pàula) is an Italian comune of 15,408 inhabitants in the province of Cosenza in Calabria.

It is mainly known for being the birthplace of Saint Francis of Paola.

== Geography ==
Paola borders along the coast to the north with the territory of Fuscaldo, to the south with San Lucido and inland with Montalto Uffugo and San Fili. It is 35 km (22 mi) from the provincial capital and 50 km (31 mi) from the international airport of Lamezia Terme. The town has an important railway station.

Seismic classification: zone 2 (medium-high seismicity)

== History ==
The origins of the name Paola

The documentation on the origin of the name of the present-day town of Paola is rather scarce and appears at the end of the 11th century, when the tenimentum Paulae is mentioned within the possessions of the Norman notable Roberto Bohon of Fuscaldo.

From the middle of the 16th century, numerous scholars have tried to trace the origin of the town's name.

Among them, the first was the priest Gabriele Barrio who, on the basis of the work of the historiographer Stephanus of Byzantium (who in turn drew on Hecataeus of Miletus), identified the ancient Oenotrian settlement of Patycos with the city of Paola, by assonance with the modern toponym.

- With the Roman conquest of Calabria, a Roman consul named Lucius Aemilius Paulus established his residence in the Calabrian city. Hence the name Paola would derive from him.
- In the Latin language the word Pabula means grazing land. Some important documents show that Paola was a hamlet of Fuscaldo, administered by the Marquis Spinelli of Fuscaldo. Its territory, rich in vegetation, was mainly used for grazing animals.

Among these hypotheses, the most accredited by historians is the latter, which, unlike the other two, is supported by historical evidence.

Hellenistic and Roman periods

Between the 4th and 3rd centuries B.C., the territory of Paola was most probably part of the rural district of the Bruttian oppidum of Clampetia, which recent studies have identified as the historical centre of the current municipality of San Lucido. Here, in fact, during the reconstruction of the pavement of the Church dedicated to St. John the Baptist at the end of the 1980s, the remains of a Hellenistic-era settlement were discovered, consisting of a number of living quarters with production functions, including numerous loom weights and the remains of a kiln for the production of ceramic artefacts datable to the same period. On the basis of studies carried out in the area of San Lucido, the area of Paola too must have been dotted with small productive farms linked to the cultivation of olives and vines, favoured by geomorphological conditions. Faint traces of this presence are attested by the discovery of bones and ceramic fragments recovered during archaeological excavations carried out in the courtyard of the Badia Luta monastery complex, during restoration work in the late 1990s.

Subsequently, Clampetia, together with other Breton centres in the region, took part in the second Roman-Carthaginian conflict and was finally conquered in the last years of the conflict. Rome's victory over the Carthaginians marked the end of the political independence of the indigenous peoples of Calabria and the disappearance of the farms.

The Roman influence soon triggered an impressive process of agricultural restructuring of the Calabrian countryside and new coloniae were founded to control the newly subjugated territories. Numerous villae were built on the fertile coastal terraces throughout the region, equipped with rich residences with baths or thermal baths (pars urbana) for the dominus and his family, accommodation for employees and slaves (pars rustica and ergastula), processing plants and large warehouses for storing agricultural produce (pars fructuaria and horrea).

One of these large villae was discovered in the early 1980s in contrada Cutura, on the northern outskirts of Paola. The building, which is still partially preserved and almost completely unexplored, occupies the top of a coastal terrace several tens of metres above sea level. The structures of the villa rest on an imposing masonry substructure built to regularize the natural slope of the same terrace (basis villae), with the pars urbana facing the sea, the outer face of which was interspersed with a series of niches that were intended to house a cycle of statues, making the complex even more majestic. The pars urbana also included a bath (balneum) or private spa, judging by the numerous suspensurae found on the site.

On the inner side of the coastal terrace, towards the surrounding hills, was probably the pars fructuaria of the villa, with facilities for processing olives and grapes, as documented by the numerous fragments of volcanic stone millstones and a fragment of a lithic press for crushing that have been found, as well as the numerous transport amphorae produced on site and discovered in small excavation tests carried out in 2002 by the Archaeological Superintendence of Calabria.

Byzantine Domination

In 395, with the death of Emperor Theodosius, the Roman Empire was split into two, the Western Roman Empire and the Eastern Roman Empire. The former was entrusted to Theodosius' youngest son Honorius; the latter to the emperor's eldest son Arcadius. The Byzantine Empire included parts of central Italy, southern Italy and Asia Minor, so the territory of Paola also became a Byzantine possession.

Justinian's reign was marked by a continuous struggle for dominance over Italian territory against first the Ostrogoths and then the Lombards. By 536, Byzantine possessions had been reduced to the Exarchate of Italy, the Republic of Venice, the Duchy of Naples, Sardinia and Corsica, Sicily and the Duchy of Calabria. In the following centuries the Byzantines faced Arab and Saracen invasions, as a result of which Sicily fell into Arab hands and the Duchy of Calabria was constantly plagued by the Islamists. It was during this period that Calabria became the favourite corner of the growing Basilian monasticism. The monks, following the Arab conquest of Sicily, found themselves forced to live in constant danger, so they abandoned it to settle in Calabria, especially along the Tyrrhenian coast.

In the territory of Paola monks of St Basil, in particular of the Basilian Order of St Josaphat founded two monasteries, one in the Badia locality, consecrated to St Mary of the Valley of Josaphat and the Fosse, the other on the northern side of the territory, consecrated to St Michael the Archangel. From an architectural, historical and ritual analysis we can understand that we are dealing with a type of monastery called Laura. These religious centres had the function of controlling the population in collaboration with the local feudal lord, the religious power and the constituted power collaborating to obtain the respect and devotion they demanded from the citizens for the development of the society of the time. In 1110, the wife of the feudal lord of Fuscaldo, Roberto de Bubum, made a written donation to the monks of the monastery of Santa Maria delle Fosse. Thanks to this donation, the monks were granted the property where they would later build the monastery, an old water mill, livestock and farmers to work the land. With this donation, Sica (widow of Robert of Bubum) tried to encourage the work of the monks towards the population, also obtaining their obedience.

Norman Domination

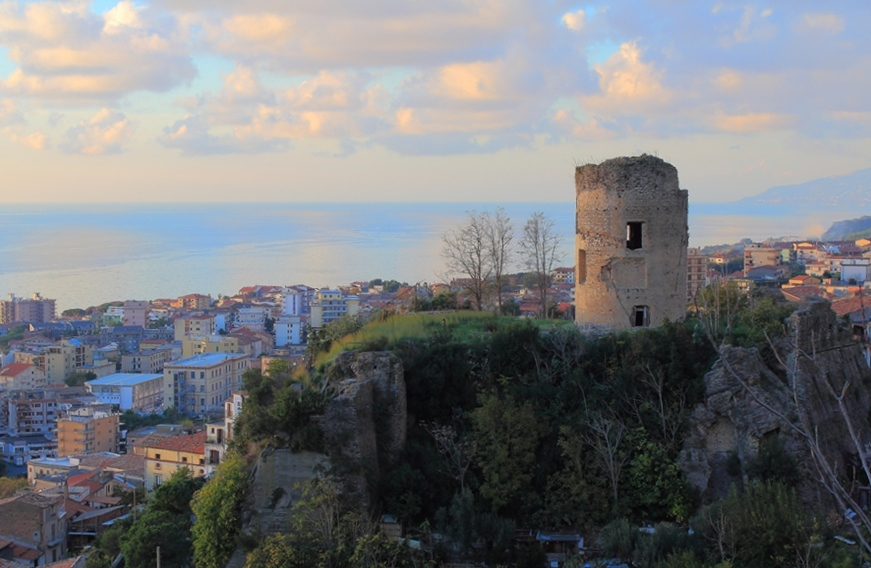
Castle of Paola (CS)

Around the year 1000 A.D. the Normans, a people of warriors from Scandinavia, arrived in Italy on board the mighty drakkar.

They were led by William of Hauteville, known as the Iron Hand, and his brother Drogone. In a short time these leaders took the Byzantines' dominion over southern Italy, starting with Sicily. In 1050, Robert of Hauteville, known as Guiscard, arrived in Calabria, joined in 1057 by his brother Roger. The two began to lay siege to the main cities of Calabria, at first encountering opposition from the papacy. At the battle of Civitate, the army of volunteers led by Leo IX suffered a total defeat and the pontiff himself was captured by the Normans. With the arrival of the Scandinavians, all the Orthodox dioceses were converted into Catholic dioceses, so Pope Nicholas II decided to form an alliance with the new masters of the south and in 1059 in Melfi solemnly invested Robert Guiscard with the title of "Duke of Apulia, Calabria and Sicily". The city of Paola owes the construction of the "Castle of Paola" to the Normans around 1110 AD. This stronghold was built using mortar and sandstone, in a strategic position overlooking the city and was intended to defend monks and inhabitants from soldiers passing through the Paola territory.

Swabian-Angevin domination

During the reign of Frederick II of Swabia, Calabria reached one of its moments of greatest prosperity. The sovereign had his residence in Melfi, in Basilicata. He built the castle and the cathedral in Cosenza and the fortress of Rocca Imperiale on the Ionian Sea. The Calabrians always remained loyal to the Swabians, even after the death of Corradin of Swabia, who was killed by order of Charles I of Anjou, who took power in Naples. Paola also benefited from this prosperous period. The town gradually began to grow until, when Calabria passed from Swabian to Angevin rule, it became a fief, and was entrusted to the Ruffo family. In 1418 Polissena Ruffo married the Duke of Milan Francesco Sforza, bringing as dowry the Paolano territory. Polissena died of poisoning by one of her uncles in 1420 without giving any heirs to the Duke of Milan, and Paola and the other villages she had brought as dowry returned to her family. The fief of Paola was again brought as a dowry by Covella, younger sister of Polissena, when she married Giovanni Antonio Marzano. From their union Marino Marzano was born, who was stripped of the fief for having conspired against the King of Naples Ferrante of Aragon.

Aragonese and French domination

With the arrival of the Aragonese, Paola reached the status of a city and was proclaimed such by Ferdinand II of Aragon. During the landing, which took place in 1283, the inhabitants of the Fosse district, to avoid being involved in the clashes, entrenched themselves in the areas surrounding the Castle of Paola, upsetting the balance that revolved around the ancient abbey of their district. The monastery therefore faced an inevitable decline, despite the efforts of the last inhabitants and monks.

On 2 July 1555, the town was besieged by the Turks, commanded by Dragut Rais, who sacked and burned the town, attacked the Convent of the Minim Friars founded by St Francis and plundered it. After recovering, the town continued to live like the other towns in Calabria, but it was getting bigger and bigger, also growing in importance.

On 18 October 1806, Paola was occupied by the French. They burnt and sacked the Sanctuary of St Francis, which remained deserted. Following a law issued by Joachim Murat in 1809, the suppression of all religious orders in the Kingdom of Naples began, including the proto-cenoby of the Minims of Paola. Despite its importance, the convents were all converted to other uses, often military, the churches passed to the diocesan clergy and all clerical property was confiscated.

Kingdom of the Two Sicilies and Kingdom of Italy

After the Congress of Vienna (1815), Ferdinand IV of Bourbon was restored to the throne of Naples. The following year the two kingdoms of Naples and Sicily were united to form the new Kingdom of the Two Sicilies. In 1844 King Ferdinand II and his wife Maria Theresa of Habsburg visited Paola as a vow. The king later returned on 29 October 1852, accompanied by the crown prince, Francesco.

During the Risorgimento, Paola participated in Garibaldi's movement. The hero of the two worlds, however, did not pass through the town, unlike his Garibaldini. They were even helped by the municipality when troops commanded by Nino Bixio and Giacomo Medici embarked to join Garibaldi in Naples. Before the construction of the Paola-Cosenza railway in 1910, the port of Paola was very busy, the steamers from Naples and Messina were loaded with goods and travellers and trade flourished. The last secretary of the Fascist Party, Carlo Scorza, was born there.

== Main sights ==
The town is one of the destinations for religious tourism in Calabria.

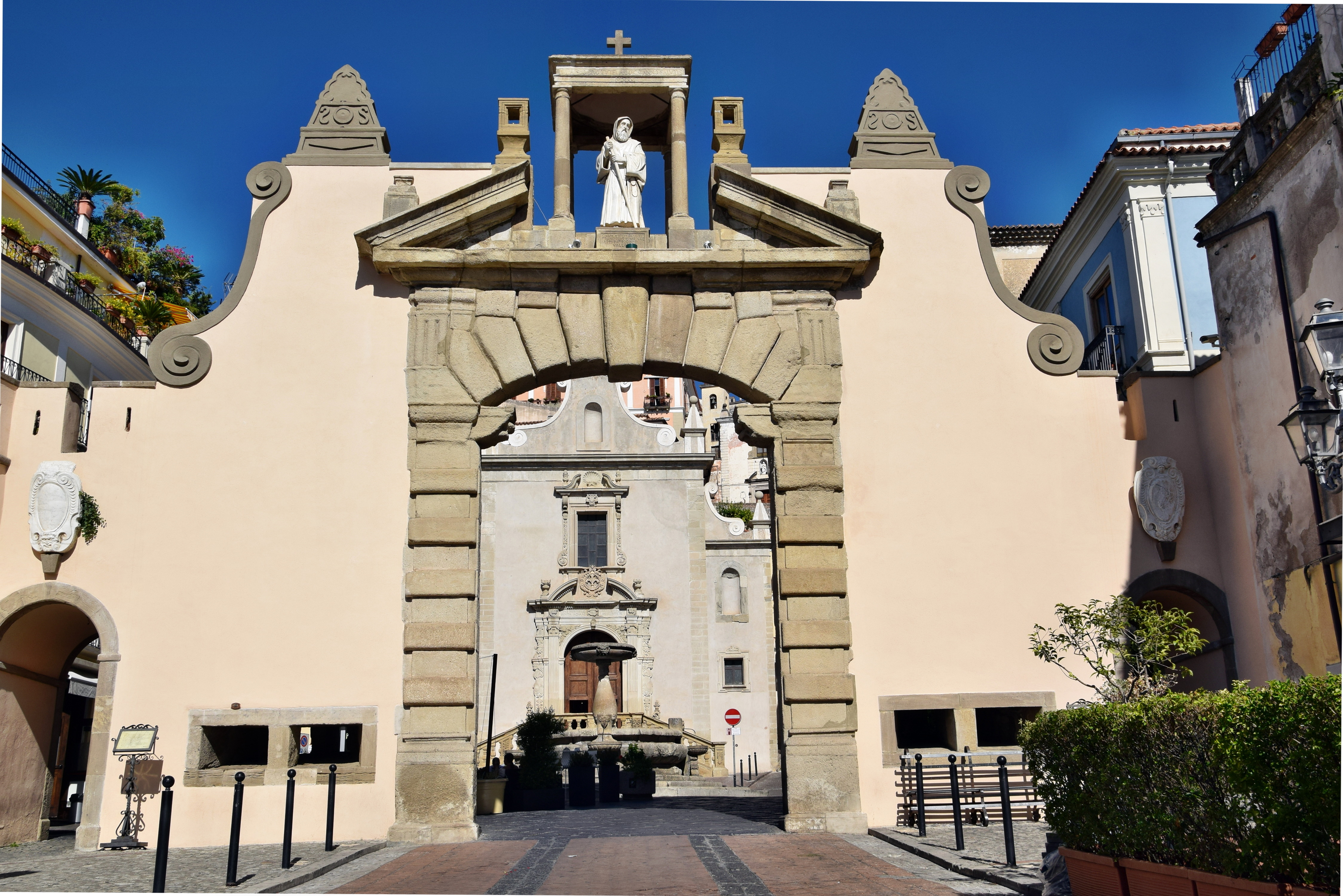
Arch of St Francis of Paola

Among the main places of interest are the Sanctuary of St Francis, the Badia, the so-called church of Sotterra (in the locality of the same name – formerly Gaudimare – with paintings of which the oldest ones date back to the early Middle Ages), Roman ruins, Scorza Palace, and the castle of Paola.

The birth of St Francis of Paola is celebrated on 27 March, and his death on 2 April (the canonical feast day of the saint). Solemn celebrations in honour of St Francis are held from 1 to 4 May, with several processions on land and at sea of the Saint's 'bust' and cloak. Tradition has it that a boatman refused to ferry St Francis from the Calabrian coast to Messina and the Saint crossed the strait with his cloak. St Francis has been proclaimed patron saint of Calabria as well as patron of seafarers. On 4 May 2008, the celebrations for the fifth centenary of the death of St Francis ended.

With regard to the elements of historical, religious and cultural value, it should be remembered that the 16th century was undoubtedly a golden period for Paola, thanks especially to St Francis, whose faithful came from all over Calabria. For this reason there was a remarkable urban growth for those times. As the city expanded, its buildings, streets and fountains were embellished. In a little less than a century there was a feverish building and artistic activity.

Apart from the sanctuary of San Francesco di Paola, there are numerous churches and convents in Paola:

- Church of Sotterra
- Church of the Madonna del Carmine
- Church of San Michele
- Badia Convent
- Cathedral
- Convent of Sant'Agostino
- Church of San Giacomo Maggiore
- Convent of the Capuchins
- Church of San Leonardo
- Church of the Immaculate Conception
- Jesuit Convent
- Church of the Rosary
- Church of San Francischiello
- Church of Montevergine
- Church of the Madonna delle Grazie
- Church of the Addolorata
- Church of Santa Margherita
- Church of San Giuseppe
- Church of Santa Maria di Porto Salvo
- Church of Our Lady of Angels
- Church of Sant'Anna

Fortifications:

- Norman-Aragonese Castle
- Tower of the Blow
- Badia Tower

Archaeological sites:

- C. da Cutura
- Via S. Agata

The following are also worth mentioning:

- Monument to the Fallen;
- Arch of St Francis (entrance to the city);
- The 'Pisciariddi' (monumental fountain in Piazza del Popolo);
- Clock Tower;
- Birthplace of the patron saint;
- Steps;
- Fontana delle sette cannelle (Seven canals fountain);
- Rocchetta (a district with all its characteristic architecture, including alleys, openings, loggias, arches, buttresses and stone portals);
- Piazza del Popolo.

Fountain of the Seven Canals

The monumental Fountain of the Seven Canals stands at the foot of a long flight of steps and is the work of local craftsmen; it is dated 1636. The fountain opens like a large fan, reminding us of the tail of the peacock, the symbol of Paola: originally it had 12 holes (Abate Pacichelli), today it consists of two arms, the walls of which have seven panels with seven stone protomes, from which the water flows, and is then collected by a channel and poured into a semi-circular basin. The stone shields, although worn by time, are still intact: they depict the symbol of the peacock and the coat of arms of the Spinelli family, who bought Paola at the beginning of the 16th century and governed it for about three centuries.

Sanctuary of St Francis

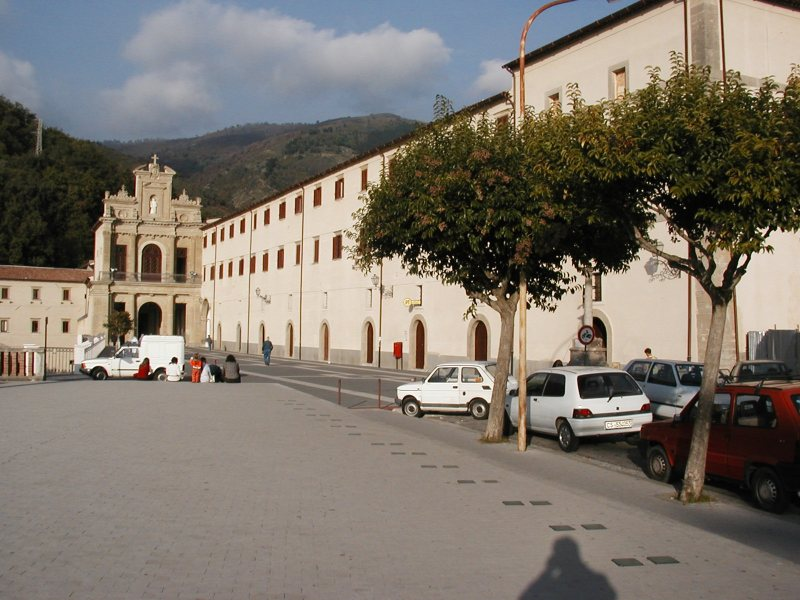
View of the entrance to the Sanctuary of St Francis of Paola

The Sanctuary of San Francis of Paola is located in the upper part of the town, in a valley bordered by the Isca stream and rich in vegetation. It is a pilgrimage destination from all over southern Italy, especially from Calabria, of which St Francis is the patron saint. It houses part of the saint's remains (the rest are in Tours, France).

In front of the sanctuary there is a large square, at the edge of which stands the main façade of the temple. To the right of the main entrance, there is an archway leading to the side of the sanctuary, which houses the large modern basilica (opened in 2000) and the Cucchiarella fountain, from which pilgrims drink. Next to this is an unexploded bomb, which fell into the stream next to the sanctuary during an Anglo-American bombing raid in August 1943, but which did not damage the sanctuary. Continuing on, you come to the Devil's Bridge and a path at the end of which is a place that was the saint's refuge in his youth.

Entering the sanctuary through the main entrance leads to two initial semi-open rooms. The first contains several plaques from the 16th and 20th centuries commemorating various anniversaries and events at the sanctuary, while the second is the true pronaos of the old basilica: to the right is the portal to the basilica, to the left is a view of the stream and the adjacent monastery, and ahead is the entrance to the cloister and hermitage of the saint and the cell of Blessed Nicholas.

The ancient Romanesque basilica, dating from the 16th century, consists of a large, rather bare main hall and a single side aisle on the right, along which there are four small chapels, culminating in the sumptuous Baroque chapel housing the few relics of St Francis that have survived in Paola, including some of his clothes and bone fragments.

In the cloister of the sanctuary, closed to the outside with stained glass windows, is the rose garden of the saint, which is now a large garden and has frescoes along its interior walls depicting the main episodes in the life of the saint, many of which are linked to legends. Adjacent to it is the hermitage of St Francis, a set of narrow underground spaces that constituted the first nucleus of the coenoby for the saint and his confreres. The bell tower of the temple rises between the cloister and the ancient basilica.

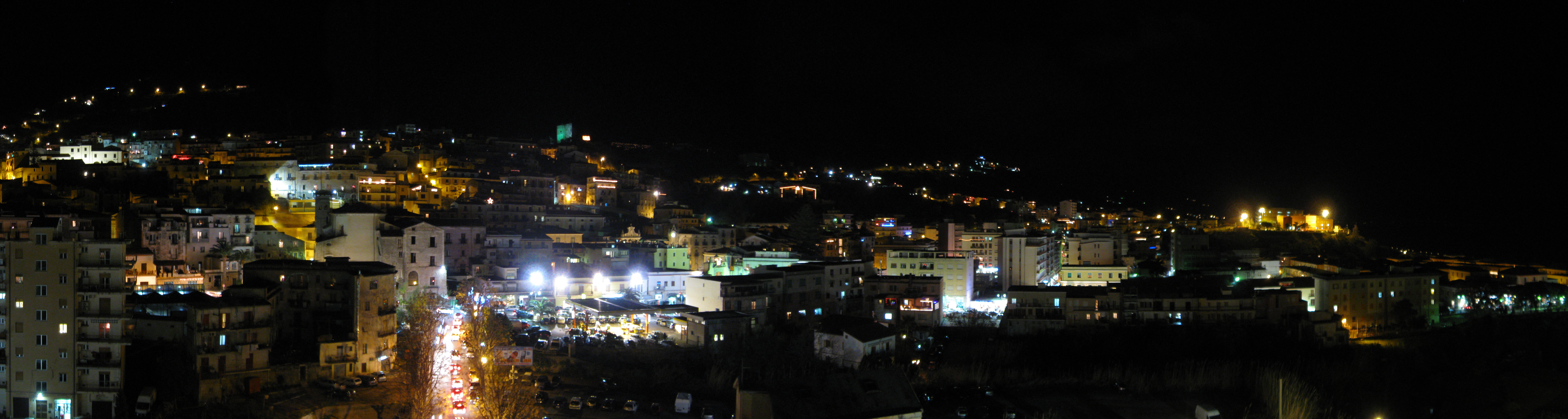
Night-time cityscape

== Transport ==
The town has several infrastructures and connecting lines such as: the railway station along the Southern Tyrrhenian Railway and interchange point with the Paola-Cosenza railway. The town is crossed by the state road 18 along the north-south axis from which the state road 107 branches off. In the city there are various means of transport such as taxis, buses and urban service, in the city there is a minibus service on call.

== Twin towns ==
- Assisi, Italy
- Barra do Piraí, Brazil
- Fréjus, France
- Otranto, Italy
- Puerto Madryn, Argentina
- San Giovanni in Fiore, Italy
- Susa, Italy

== See also ==
- US Paolana
- Paola railway station
