= USO Calcio =

Italian football club

U.S.O. Calcio
- Full name: Unione Sportiva Oratorio Calcio
- Founded: 1978 (as U.S.O. Calcio); 2007 (as Calcio Caravaggese); 2009 (as U.S.O. Calcio)
- Dissolved: 2011
- Ground: Stadio Comunale, Calcio, Italy
- Capacity: 1,500
- League: Promozione
| Home colours | Away colours |

Unione Sportiva Oratorio Calcio was an Italian association football club representing the Lombardian towns of Calcio, Lombardy.

== History ==
=== The foundation ===
The club was founded in 1978 as Unione Sportiva Oratorio Calcio, (also known as U.S.O. Calcio) in the town of Calcio.

=== U.S. Calcio Caravaggese ===
Old Calcio Caravaggese logo

In 2007 the club was merged with U.S. Caravaggese, a team of the town of Caravaggio founding U.S. Calcio Caravaggese. From 2007 to 2009 the club has played its home matches at Nuovo Stadio Comunale in the town Caravaggio, which has a capacity of 2,000.

Soon later the club, second-placed in the 2006–07 Serie D group B as U.S.O. Calcio, was admitted in the Serie C2 for the 2007–08 season to fill a vacancy created by league winners Tempio.

The club was immediately relegated to Serie D. Also in the following season it was again relegated, this time in Eccellenza.

=== The return to the origins ===
In the summer 2009, the executives representatives of the city of Caravaggio after disagreements over the management team, left the company refounding the team of Caravaggio and so U.S. Calcio Caravaggese has changed its name returning to the original name of U.S.O. Calcio and in the season 2009–10 it has played in Eccellenza Lombardy group C.

=== Merger with Rudianese ===
In the summer 2010 the club joins forces with A.C.D. Rudianese and A.S.D. Urago D´Oglio founding U.S.O. Calcio Rudianese, but still retains the title of Eccellenza for one year, until the summer 2011 when the merger becomes official.

== Colors and badge ==
Its colors were white and dark red.

== Honours ==
- Coppa Italia Serie D
  - Champions (1): 2004–05
