= Filippo Maniero =

Italian footballer

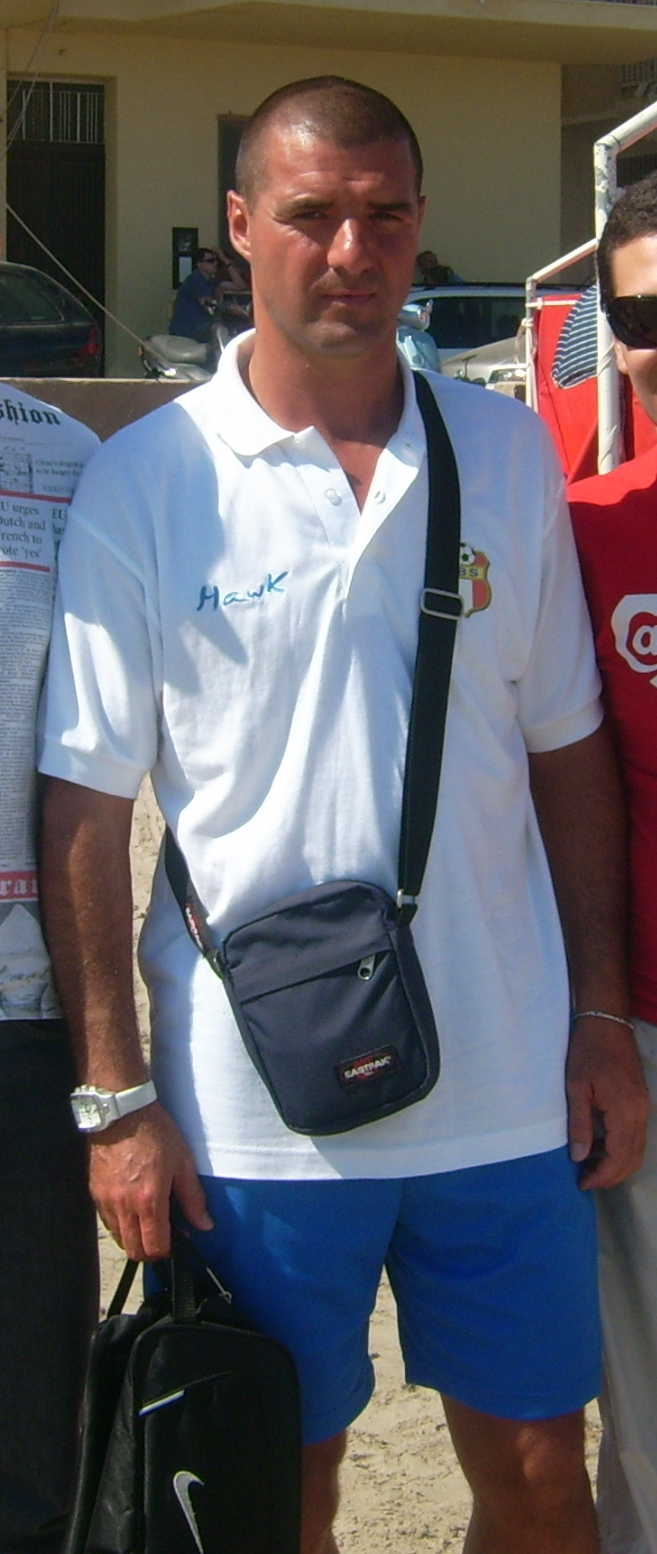

Personal information
- Date of birth: 11 September 1972 (age 54)
- Place of birth: Padua, Italy
- Height: 1.85 m (6 ft 1 in)
- Position: Striker

Senior career*
Years	Team	Apps	(Gls)
1989–1990	Padova	17	(3)
1990–1991	Atalanta	6	(0)
1991	Padova	4	(1)
1991–1992	Ascoli	17	(4)
1992–1995	Padova	60	(10)
1995–1996	Sampdoria	25	(6)
1996–1997	Verona	33	(11)
1997–1998	Parma	10	(4)
1998	AC Milan	13	(3)
1998–2002	Venezia	116	(54)
2002–2004	Palermo	31	(13)
2003–2004	→ Brescia (loan)	18	(1)
2004–2005	Torino	27	(6)
2005	Rangers	0	(0)
2005–2006	Nuova Piovese	?	(?)
2006–2007	Legnarese	?	(?)

International career
1990–1991	Italy U21	4	(0)
- * Club domestic league appearances and goals as of 2008-01-15

Filippo "Pippo" Maniero (born 11 September 1972) is an Italian retired association footballer who played as a striker.

== Club career ==
Maniero played for several teams throughout his career, most notably AC Milan, Parma, Palermo and Torino.

On 31 August 2005, after having been released on a free transfer consequently to the cancellation of Torino, he signed for Rangers, the last day of the transfer window at the start of the 2005–06 season. However he left the club after two months having not made any appearances. He later joined Nuova Piovese, a Venetian team of Eccellenza league, leading it to Serie D promotion. In July 2006 he left Nuova Piovese for Legnarese, a small Prima Categoria (8th division) team in which he started his playing career, where he spent the 2006–07 season.
