= Matías Garavano =

Argentine footballer (born 1984)

Personal information
- Full name: Matías Daniel Garavano
- Date of birth: 24 August 1984 (age 42)
- Place of birth: San Nicolás, Buenos Aires, Argentina
- Height: 1.90 m (6 ft 3 in)
- Position: Goalkeeper

Youth career
- 2003–2004: Rosario Central
- 2004–2005: Real Valladolid

Senior career*
Years	Team	Apps	(Gls)
2006	Deportes Puerto Montt	18	(0)
2007–2008	Rampla Juniors	21	(0)
2008	Juventud Las Piedras	8	(0)
2009	Mérida	30	(0)
2009–2010	Galipolli	14	(0)
2010–2011	Cerro Reyes	13	(0)
2011	Atlético Baleares	8	(0)
2011–2013	Nacional Potosí	28	(0)
2013–2015	Boca Unidos	32	(0)
2015	Los Andes	0	(0)
2016	Douglas Haig	20	(0)
2016–2017	Instituto	17	(0)
2018–2019	Flandria	19	(0)
2019–2020	Empalme Central	–	(–)
Total		228	(0)
- * Club domestic league appearances and goals

Matías Daniel Garavano (born 24 August 1984) is an Argentine retired footballer who played as a goalkeeper.

== Personal life ==
He is the younger brother of the also professional footballer Gonzalo Garavano, with whom he coincided in Rampla Juniors and Empalme Central.
