= AS Ippogrifo Sarno ASD =

Italian football club

Ippogrifo Sarno
- Full name: Associazione Sportiva Ippogrifo Sarno; Associazione Sportiva Dilettante
- Founded: 1989
- Dissolved: 2021
- Ground: Stadio Felice Squitieri, Sarno, Italy
- Capacity: 4,000
- League: Serie D/I
- 2006–07: Serie D/H, 10th
Home colours	Away colours

Associazione Sportiva Ippogrifo Sarno Associazione Sportiva Dilettante is an Italian association football club located in Sarno, Campania.

It currently plays in Serie D. Its colors are all-maroon.

== Name ==
The club takes its name from the mythical Hippogriff (Italian: Ippogrifo).
