= US Pergolese =

Italian football club

Pergolese
- Full name: Unione Calcio Pergolese
- Founded: 1923; 103 years ago as, Unione Sportiva Pergolese; 2019; 7 years ago as, Unione Calcio Pergolese (refounded)
- Ground: Stadio Mario Stefanelli, Pergola, Italy
- Capacity: 1,100
- Chairman: Enrico Rossi
- Manager: Gianluca Fenucci
- League: Prima Categoria
- 2006–07: 14th (group F; relegated after play-off)
Home colours	Away colours

Unione Calcio Pergolese, commonly referred to as Pergolese, is an Italian association football club located in Pergola, Marche. It currently plays in Prima Categoria. Its colors are red and blue.

== History ==
The club, with numerous Serie D and Eccellenza appearances under its belt, went bankrupt in 2019 and restarted from the Terza Categoria, in the backdrop of Italian football. The club gained three consecutive promotions (in four years, as the 2020–2021 season was not held due to the COVID-19 pandemic), and in 2023 it reached the Promozione.
