= SSD Centobuchi =

Italian football club

Centobuchi
- Full name: Società Sportiva Dilettante Centobuchi
- Nickname: –
- Founded: 1972
- Ground: Stadio Comunale, Centobuchi, Monteprandone, Italy
- Capacity: 1,200
- Chairman: Claudio Marocchi
- League: Serie D/F
- 2009–10: Serie D/F, 16th
Home colours	Away colours

Società Sportiva Dilettante Centobuchi is an Italian association football club located in Centobuchi, a frazione of Monteprandone, Marche. It currently plays in Serie D. Its colors are white and blue.
