= ASD Rivignano =

Italian football club

Rivignano
- Full name: Associazione Sportiva Dilettantistica Rivignano
- Nicknames: Nerazzurri (black & light blue)
- Founded: 1919
- Ground: Stadio Comunale di via Udine, Rivignano, Italy
- Capacity: 1,050
- Chairman: Claudio Paroni
- Manager: Massimo Zucco
- League: Seconda Categoria
- 2007–08: Serie D/C, 17th (relegated)
| Home colours | Away colours |

Associazione Sportiva Dilettantistica Rivignano, or simply Rivignano, is an Italian association football club located in Rivignano, Friuli-Venezia Giulia. It currently plays in Seconda Categoria.

== History ==
The club has passed the century of life and has known the glories of Serie D, crossing its destiny with that of many luxury teams. FC Rivignano was born in 1919, at the dawn of football in Friuli. It was immediately a point of reference for the territory.
A turning point occurred in the Nineties with the refurbishment of the sports field, transformed thanks to the interventions of the public administrations into a real jewel at the regional level. At that time, Claudio Paroni arrived at the helm of the club, who also wore the Nerazzurri shirt as a player, and who has held the role of president since 1993, as well as holding the position of sporting director and embodying the Nerazzurri soul. Before him, the other historic president Giuseppe Pighin had helped give the club a boost. On the sporting level, also thanks to the support of the main sponsor Prosciuttifici Picaron, the "Miracle Rivignano" begins in the mid-2000s. The Nerazzurri go up to Serie D, for the first time in their history, at the end of the 2004–05 season. In the top amateur league they stay for three seasons, before returning to Eccellenza, then to Promozione and Prima Categoria afterwards.
In addition to the youth sector, which has over 100 members, in 2013 ASD Rivignano (which already collaborated with ASD Pocenia and ASD Varmo) and ASD Polisportiva Codroipo joined forces in an interesting project entrusted to Furio Corosu (former Nerazzurri coach) as technical director. The whole includes 15 teams and about 250 boys, as well as 25 highly trained technicians.

=== Recent seasons ===
| Season | League | | | | | | | | | Cups | |
| Season | Division | P | W | D | L | F | A | Pts | Pos | Cup | Round |
|---|---|---|---|---|---|---|---|---|---|---|---|
| 1991–92 | Prima Categoria, group C | 30 | 9 | 11 | 10 | 34 | 33 | 29 | 9th | Region Cup | ? |
| 1992–93 | Prima Categoria, group C | 30 | 10 | 17 | 7 | 30 | 27 | 37 | 8th | Region Cup | ? |
| 1993–94 | Prima Categoria, group B | 30 | 14 | 8 | 8 | 33 | 23 | 36 | 3rd | Region Cup | ? |
| 1994–95 | Prima Categoria, group C | 30 | 19 | 8 | 3 | 53 | 15 | 46 | 1st ↑ | Region Cup | ? |
| 1995–96 | Promozione, group B | 30 | 16 | 8 | 6 | 34 | 20 | 56 | 2nd ↑ | FVG Cup | 2nd round |
| 1996–97 | Eccellenza | 30 | 13 | 12 | 5 | 36 | 24 | 51 | 2nd | FVG Cup | Semifinals |
| 1997–98 | Eccellenza | 30 | 10 | 8 | 12 | 24 | 27 | 38 | 10th | FVG Cup | 2nd round |
| 1998–99 | Eccellenza | 30 | 5 | 13 | 13 | 29 | 38 | 28 | 14th ↓ | FVG Cup | 1st round |
| 1999–00 | Promozione, group A | 30 | 17 | 10 | 3 | 52 | 24 | 61 | 1st ↑ | FVG Cup | 1st round |
| 2000–01 | Eccellenza | 30 | 10 | 8 | 12 | 37 | 32 | 38 | 11th | FVG Cup | 1st round |
| 2001–02 | Eccellenza | 30 | 11 | 10 | 9 | 49 | 40 | 43 | 6th | FVG Cup | 1st round |
| 2002–03 | Eccellenza | 30 | 10 | 8 | 12 | 44 | 44 | 38 | 11th | FVG Cup | 1st round |
| 2003–04 | Eccellenza | 32 | 16 | 12 | 4 | 48 | 25 | 60 | 2nd | FVG Cup | Semifinals |
| 2004–05 | Eccellenza | 30 | 15 | 12 | 3 | 41 | 20 | 57 | 2nd ↑ | FVG Cup | Semifinals |
| 2005–06 | Serie D, group D | 38 | 12 | 6 | 20 | 32 | 46 | 42 | 15th | Serie D Cup | 1st round |
| 2006–07 | Serie D, group C | 34 | 8 | 10 | 15 | 41 | 55 | 35 | 16th | Serie D Cup | 2nd round |
| 2007–08 | Serie D, group C | 34 | 5 | 10 | 19 | 21 | 52 | 25 | 17th ↓ | Serie D Cup | 1st round |
| 2008–09 | Eccellenza | 30 | 13 | 5 | 12 | 32 | 33 | 44 | 7th | FVG Cup | 1st round |
| 2009–10 | Eccellenza | 30 | 6 | 5 | 19 | 19 | 50 | 23 | 15th ↓ | FVG Cup | Semifinals |
| 2010–11 | Promozione, group A | 30 | 8 | 13 | 9 | 40 | 33 | 37 | 9th | FVG Cup | 1st round |
| 2011–12 | Promozione, group A | 30 | 19 | 6 | 5 | 60 | 25 | 63 | 3rd | FVG Cup | Quarters |
| 2012–13 | Promozione, group A | 30 | 20 | 7 | 3 | 67 | 16 | 67 | 2nd ↑ | FVG Cup | Runners-up |
| 2013–14 | Eccellenza | 30 | 8 | 7 | 15 | 30 | 43 | 31 | 14th ↓ | FVG Cup | 1st round |
| 2014–15 | Promozione, group A | 30 | 19 | 6 | 5 | 58 | 23 | 63 | 1st ↑ | Promozione Cup | Quarters |
| 2015–16 | Eccellenza | 30 | 5 | 7 | 18 | 24 | 66 | 22 | 16th ↓ | FVG Cup | Semifinals |
| 2016–17 | Promozione, group A | 30 | 6 | 5 | 19 | 29 | 60 | 23 | 16th ↓ | Promozione Cup | 1st round |
| 2017–18 | Prima Categoria, group B | 30 | 11 | 8 | 11 | 32 | 29 | 41 | 7th | Prima Categoria Cup | 1st round |
| 2018–19 | Prima Categoria, group C | 30 | 11 | 12 | 7 | 36 | 24 | 45 | 6th | Prima Categoria Cup | Runners-up |
| 2019–20 | Prima Categoria, group B | 22 | 8 | 10 | 4 | 26 | 20 | 34 | 6th | Prima Categoria Cup | Interrupted |
| 2020–21 | Prima Categoria, group A | 4 | 1 | 2 | 1 | 5 | 7 | 5 | | Prima Categoria Cup | Interrupted |
| 2021-22 | Prima Categoria, group B | 30 | 15 | 8 | 7 | 49 | 32 | 53 | 4th | Prima Categoria Cup | 1st Round |
| 2022-23 | Prima Categoria, group A | 30 | 13 | 8 | 9 | 47 | 36 | 47 | 7th | Prima Categoria Cup | Quarters |
Source: Messaggero Veneto – Giornale del Friuli

=== Key ===
| 1st | 2nd | ↑ | ↓ |
| Champions | Runners-up | Promoted | Relegated |

== Honours ==
- Eccellenza Friuli-Venezia Giulia (1st regional level)

Runners-up: 1996–97, 2004–05

- Promozione Friuli-Venezia Giulia (2nd regional level)

Winners: 1999–00, 2014–15
Runners-up: 1995–96, 2012–13

- Prima Categoria Friuli-Venezia Giulia (3rd regional level)

Winners: 1994–95

- Coppa Italia Dilettanti Friuli-Venezia Giulia

Runners up: 2012–13

- Coppa Regione Prima Categoria Friuli-Venezia Giulia

Winners: 2023-24
Runners up: 2018-19

== Colors and badge ==
The team's colors are black and light blue.
