= ASD Cervia 1920 =

Italian football club

Cervia
- Full name: Cervia United
- Nickname: I Cervi (The Bucks)
- Founded: 1920; 106 years ago as, Associazione Sportiva Cervia; 1930; 96 years ago as, Società Sportiva Cervia; 1945; 81 years ago as, Associazione Sportiva Cervia (refounded); 1951; 75 years ago as, C.R.A.L. Salina Cervia (relocated); 1953; 73 years ago as, Associazione Sportiva Cervia (refounded); 2004; 22 years ago as, Associazione Sportiva Dilettantistica Cervia 1920; 2005; 21 years ago as, Cervia Vodafone; 2006; 20 years ago as, Associazione Sportiva Cervia 1920; 2024; 2 years ago as, Cervia United (merged)
- Ground: Stadio Germano Todoli, Cervia, Italy
- Capacity: 1,600
- Chairman: Ughetto Cangini
- Manager: Roberto Biserni
- League: Promozione Emilia-Romagna
- 2006–07: Serie D/D, 18th (relegated)
- Website: unitedcervia.it
Home colours	Away colours

Cervia United is an Italian football club located in Cervia, Emilia-Romagna. Their colors are blue and yellow. It currently plays in Promozione Emilia-Romagna.

== History ==
The team is known in Italy for having been the subject of a reality show on football, named Campioni, il Sogno and broadcast by national channel Italia 1, for their 2004–05 and 2005–06 campaigns. The team, who won Eccellenza in 2004–05 and unsuccessfully played the promotion playoff the following season, was coached by former Italian international and 1982 World Champion Francesco Graziani during this time. Cervia also played in the 2006–07 Coppa Italia, being defeated 6–0 at the first round by Serie A team Ascoli. Following the closure of the reality show, Cervia did not manage to save from relegation in their second Serie D campaign, and were relegated at the end of the season. They will play Eccellenza in 2007–08.
