= ASD Verucchio =

Italian football club

Verucchio
- Full name: Associazione Sportiva Dilettantistica Verucchio
- Nickname(s): –
- Founded: 1957
- Ground: Nuovo Centro Sportivo, Verucchio, Italy
- Capacity: 500
- Chairman: Claudio Fabbri
- Manager: Davide Nicolini
- League: Promozione
- Promozione 2012-13: Promozione, 6th
Home colours	Away colours

Associazione Sportiva Dilettantistica Verucchio is an Italian association football club located in Verucchio, Emilia-Romagna. It currently plays in Promozione. Its colors are pink and black.
