= US Paolana =

Italian football club

Paolana
- Full name: Unione Sportiva Paolana
- Founded: 1922
- Ground: Stadio Eugenio Tarsitano, Paola, Italy
- Capacity: 3,600
- Chairman: Franco Marcone
- Manager: Francesco Corapi
- League: Eccellenza Calabria
- 2006–07: Serie D/I, 18th (relegated)
- Website: www.paolana.it
Home colours	Away colours

Unione Sportiva Paolana is an Italian association football club located in Paola, Calabria. It currently plays in Eccellenza Calabria. Its colors are all-blue.
