= ASD Leonessa Altamura =

Italian football club

Leonessa Altamura
- Full name: Associazione Sportiva Dilettante; Leonessa Altamura
- Founded: 2006; 19 years ago
- Ground: Stadio Comunale, Altamura, Italy
- Capacity: 3,800
- Chairman: Michele Maggi
- League: Eccellenza Apulia
- 2005–06: Serie D/H, 17th
Home colours	Away colours

Associazione Sportiva Dilettante Leonessa Altamura is an Italian football club based in Altamura, Apulia. Founded in 2006, the club is currently playing in Eccellenza Apulia. Club's colors are red and white.

Until the 2005–06 season, the club was known as San Paolo Bari, and was based in Bari, Apulia.
