= ASD Campobello =

Italian football club

Campobello
- Full name: Associazione Sportiva Dilettante; Campobello
- Nickname: Canarini
- Founded: 1987
- Dissolved: 2018
- Ground: Stadio Domenico Stallone Castro, Campobello di Mazara, Italy
- Capacity: 1,500
Home colours	Away colours

Associazione Sportiva Dilettante Campobello was an Italian association football club located in Campobello di Mazara, Sicily. Its colors were yellow and blue.

The club played its home matches at Stadio Domenico Stallone Castro.

Campobello were promoted first to Serie D in 2005, after being crowned Eccellenza Sicily champions. They successively spent three consecutive seasons in the Italian amateur topflight, playing home games in nearby Castelvetrano at Stadio Paolo Marino on this period, before being relegated in 2008. The club experienced a second consecutive relegation one year later, this time to Promozione, ending the season in second-last place. One more relegation came in 2013, bringing the club down to Prima Categoria.

The club ceased its existence in 2018, after selling its Promozione membership rights to Castelvetrano neighbours Folgore.
