= FC Sporting Genzano =

Italian football club

Sporting Genzano
- Full name: Football Club Sporting Genzano
- Nickname(s): –
- Founded: 1964; 1995 (refounded)
- Ground: Stadio Comunale, Genzano di Lucania, Italy
- Capacity: 1,500
- Chairman: Donato Nei
- Manager: Pietro Ruisi
- League: Serie D/H
- 2007–08: Eccellenza Basilicata, 1st
Home colours	Away colours

Football Club Sporting Genzano is an Italian association football club located in Genzano di Lucania, Basilicata. It currently plays in the Serie D. Its colors are white and red.
