= AC Petacciato =

Italian football club

Petacciato
- Full name: Associazione Calcio Petacciato
- Nickname(s): –
- Founded: 1954
- Ground: Stadio Marchesi Battiloro, Petacciato, Italy
- Capacity: 1,170
- Chairman: Carmine D'Angelo
- Manager: Mauro Ponsanesi
- League: Eccellenza Molise
- 2005–06: Serie D/H, 18th
Home colours	Away colours

Associazione Calcio Petacciato is an Italian association football club located in Petacciato, Molise. It currently plays in the Eccellenza. Its colors are yellow and black. In the season 2006/07 the team gained the record for the worst performance in a national football championship: in fact it obtained the 18th place in Serie d with 5 points and no victories.
