= USD Real Forte dei Marmi-Querceta =

Italian football club

Real Forte Querceta
- Full name: Unione Sportiva Dilettantistica; Real Forte dei Marmi-Querceta
- Nickname(s): –
- Founded: 1908; 2012 (merger)
- Ground: Stadio Carlo Necchi, Forte dei Marmi, Italy
- Capacity: 2,000
- Chairman: Alessandro Mussi
- Manager: Christian Amoroso
- League: Eccellenza
- 2017–18: Serie D/E, 4th
Home colours	Away colours

Unione Sportiva Dilettantistica Real Forte dei Marmi-Querceta, normally referred to as Real Forte Querceta, is an Italian association football club located in Forte dei Marmi, Tuscany. It currently plays in the Eccellenza. Its colors are black and blue. Its name and logo are inspired by Spanish club Real Madrid CF.

The club was born in 2012 as the merger of U.S.D. Forte dei Marmi and Querceta Calcio from Querceta, a frazione of the neighbouring town of Seravezza.

== Notable former managers ==
- (Italy) Silvio Baldini (1990–1991)
