= AS Pescina Valle del Giovenco =

Italian football club

Valle del Giovenco
- Full name: Associazione Sportiva Pescina Valle del Giovenco
- Nickname: I Lupi (The Wolves)
- Founded: 2005
- Dissolved: 2010
- Ground: Stadio dei Marsi
- Capacity: 3,692
Home colours	Away colours

A.S. Pescina Valle del Giovenco, commonly referred to as simply Valle del Giovenco, was an Italian association football club. Though they were originally based in Pescina, Abruzzo, the team was playing in Avezzano, a larger city 20 kilometres to the west, at the time of their dissolution.

== History ==
Former logo, used during the winning 2006–07 Serie D season, with the club still located in Pescina

ASD Valle del Giovenco was founded in 2005. In 2006, the team gained promotion from Eccellenza after winning the promotion play-offs. The following year, the squad gained a second consecutive promotion by winning Round F of the Serie D promotion play-offs. The club then played in Serie C2 in the 2007–2008 season.

Following the promotions, the club started a rebranding process that included the relocation to Avezzano to accommodate their quickly advancing position on the Italian football scene. Starting from their official website, the club defined themselves as representative of the city of Avezzano, and changed their crest to feature a wolf in white and green color scheme, reminiscent of the defunct Nuova Avezzano Calcio franchise. They also signed a sponsorship deal with the comune of Avezzano. However, the club was folded at the end of the 2009–10 Lega Pro Prima Divisione, following its bankruptcy.

== Former coaches ==
- (Italy) Roberto Cappellacci (2006–2007;2009)
- (Italy) Andrea Chiappini (2008)
- (Italy) Carlo Perrone (2008–2009)
- (Italy) Dario Bonetti (2009–2010)
