= AS Morolo Calcio =

Italian football club

Morolo
- Full name: Associazione Sportiva Morolo Calcio
- Founded: 1966
- Ground: Stadio Arnaldo Marocco, Morolo, Italy
- Capacity: 1,000
- Chairman: Roberta Santarelli
- League: Serie D/G
- 2008–09: Serie D/G, 12th
Home colours	Away colours

Associazione Sportiva Morolo Calcio is an Italian association football club located in Morolo, Lazio. It currently plays in Eccellenza. Its colors are white and red.
