= ASD Pisoniano =

Italian football club

Pisoniano
- Full name: Associazione Sportiva Dilettante; Pisoniano
- Nickname(s): –
- Founded: 1966 ground = Stadio Don Antonio Aureli, in erba naturale Pisoniano, Italy
- Capacity: 1,000
- Chairman: nazario d'antoni
- Manager: league = Serie D
- 2006–07: Serie D/G, 16th
Home colours	Away colours

Associazione Sportiva Dilettante Pisoniano is an Italian association football club located in Pisoniano, Lazio. It played in the Eccellenza Lazio. Its colors are green and blue.
