= SSD Piovese =

Italian football club

Piovese
- Full name: Piovese S.S.D.AR.L.
- Founded: 1919; 107 years ago
- Ground: Stadio Vallini, Piove di Sacco, Italy
- League: Eccellenza
Home colours

Piovese S.S.D.AR.L. is an Italian association football club located in Piove di Sacco, Veneto. It currently plays in Promozione.

== History ==
The club promoted from Eccellenza after playoffs in 2006, with Filippo Maniero as its most representative player, but relegated from Serie D in its debut year in the division, after losing a one-legged playoff to Reno Centese.

== Colors and badge ==
Its colors are red and white.
