= AC Fidenza 1922 =

Italian football club

Fidenza
- Full name: Associazione Calcio Fidenza 1922 s.r.l.
- Founded: 1922
- Ground: Stadio Dario Ballotta, Fidenza, Italy
- Capacity: 2,400
- Chairman: Claudio Chiesa
- Manager: Francesco Montanini
- League: Serie D/D
- 2012–13: Serie D/D, 9th
Home colours	Away colours

Associazione Calcio Fidenza 1922 is an Italian association football club located in Fidenza, Emilia-Romagna. It currently plays in Serie D.

== History ==
The club was founded in 1922.

In the 2010–11 season, the team played in Eccellenza Emilia–Romagna/A, finishing the championship in 2nd position. On 5 August 2011 Fidenza was admitted to Serie D to fill vacancies.

== Team colours ==
Its colors are white and black.
