= ASD Sarzanese Calcio 1906 =

Italian football club

Sarzanese
- Full name: Associazione Sportiva Dilettantistica; Sarzanese Calcio 1906 S.r.l.
- Founded: 1906 (as "U.S. Sarzanese"); 1919 (refounded)
- Ground: Stadio Miro Luperi, Sarzana, Italy
- Capacity: 3,500
- Chairman: Marco Castagna
- Manager: Sergio Dall'Oglio
- League: Seconda Categoria Liguria/F
- 2012–13: Seconda Categoria Liguria/F, 14th
Home colours	Away colours

Associazione Sportiva Dilettantistica Sarzanese Calcio 1906 was an Italian association football club located in Sarzana, Liguria. It closed in 2020.

== History ==
Sarzanese was founded in 1906 and refounded in 1919. It closed in 2020 due to the lack of adequate sports facilities and financial support.

In summer 2011 it renounced expressly to Serie D 2011-12 and in the season 2011–12 it restarted from Seconda Categoria.

== Colors and badge ==
Its colors are red and black.
