= SSD Sapri Calcio =

Italian football club

Sapri
- Full name: Società Sportiva Dilettante Sapri Calcio SpA
- Founded: 1928
- Dissolved: 2011
- Ground: Stadio Italia, Sapri, Italy
- Capacity: 1,014
- 2010–11: Serie D/I, 10th
Home colours	Away colours

Società Sportiva Dilettante Sapri Calcio, commonly known as Sapri, was an Italian association football club located in Sapri, Campania. It has played in Serie D in the last ten years. Its colors were all-blue.

== History ==
The club was founded in 1928.

=== The exclusion from football ===
In April 2011, the club's assets were seized by authorities in a raid of suspected mafia assets.

In summer 2011 does not appeal against the exclusion of Covisod from Serie D and it was excluded from all football.

== Honours ==
- Coppa Italia Serie D
  - Champions (1): 2008–09
