= ASD SEF Tempio Pausania =

Italian football club

Tempio
- Nicknames: Tempiesi ,I Galletti (The Cockerels)
- Founded: 1946; 2008,2017 (refounded)
- Ground: Stadio Nino Manconi, Tempio Pausania, Italy
- Capacity: 3,000
- Chairman: Italy Salvatore Sechi
- Manager: Italy Mauro Giorico
- League: Eccellenza
- Website: https://www.ustempio1946.it/
Home colours	Away colours

L'U.S. Tempio S.S.D. better known as Tempio is an Italian association football club located in Tempio Pausania, Sardinia. Its colours are sky blue.

currently playing Eccellenza.
