= SP Reno Centese ASD =

Italian football club

Reno Centese
- Full name: Società Polisportiva Reno Centese; Associazione Sportiva Dilettante
- Nickname(s): Reno
- Founded: 1973; 50 years ago
- Ground: Stadio Vittorio Banzi, Cento, Italy
- Capacity: 1,000
- Chairman: Omar Diozzi
- Manager: Nicolas Michelini
- League: Seconda Categoria Bologna - Girone G
Home colours

Società Polisportiva Reno Centese Associazione Sportiva Dilettante is an Italian association football club from Reno Centese, frazione of Cento, Emilia-Romagna. It currently plays in Seconda Categoria Bologna - Girone G. Its colors are blue and light blue.
