= Alessandro Longhi (footballer) =

Italian footballer (born 1989)

Personal information
- Date of birth: 25 June 1989 (age 37)
- Place of birth: Desenzano del Garda, Italy
- Height: 1.85 m (6 ft 1 in)
- Position: Left-back

Team information
- Current team: RG Ticino
- Number: 51

Senior career*
Years	Team	Apps	(Gls)
2006–2009	Salò	60	(5)
2009–2010	FeralpiSalò	31	(1)
2010–2011	Triestina	29	(1)
2011–2016	Sassuolo	134	(3)
2016–2017	Pisa	37	(0)
2017–2019	Brescia	20	(0)
2019	Padova	12	(0)
2019–2020	Audace Cerignola	17	(1)
2020–2021	Casarano	26	(0)
2021–	RG Ticino	39	(3)

International career
2010	Italy U-20 Lega Pro	1	(0)
2011	Italy U-21 Serie B	1	(0)
- * Club domestic league appearances and goals as of 24 September 2023

Alessandro Longhi (born 25 June 1989) is an Italian footballer who plays as a left back for Serie D club RG Ticino.

== Club career ==
Born in Desenzano del Garda, the Province of Brescia, Longhi started his career at Serie D (non-professional/regional league) team Salò. In mid-2009 Salò merged with Feralpi Lonato and admitted to Lega Pro Seconda Divisione to replace the vacancy left by Pistoiese. That season he played 31 times in the professional league and played twice in promotion playoffs, finished as the losing semi-finalists.

In August 2010 he was signed by Serie B team Triestina. After the team relegated, he was sold to Serie A team Chievo. However, he was immediately farmed to Serie B Sassuolo in co-ownership deal, for €150,000 in a 3-year contract.

In June 2014, Sassuolo purchased Longhi outright for an additional €1.65 million.

On 1 July 2016, Longhi became a free agent. In the same transfer window, he was signed by Serie B club Pisa in a 2-year contract.

On 15 January 2019, Longhi joined Padova until 30 June 2019 with an option for the 2019–20 season.

== International career ==
He received a call-up from Italy U-21 Serie B team against Serbian First League Selection in March 2011. He replaced Gianluigi Bianco at half time. He also played for Italy U-20 Lega Pro team against Slovenia U-20 team in 2010, the ultimate match of 2008–09 Mirop Cup.
