= 2024–25 FC Crotone season =

FC Crotone
2024–25 season
- Manager: Emilio Longo
- Stadium: Stadio Ezio Scida
- Serie C: 4th
- Promotion play-offs: Second round
- Coppa Italia Serie C: Second round

The 2024–25 season was FC Crotone's third consecutive campaign in Serie C, the third tier of Italian football. The club also competed in the Coppa Italia Serie C.

== Transfers ==
=== In ===
Pos.	Player	Transferred from	Fee	Date	Source
DF	(Italy) Marcello Piras	(Italy) Catanzaro	Loan	5 January 2025	

=== Out ===
Pos.	Player	Transferred to	Fee	Date	Source
MF	(Bulgaria) Dimitar Kostadinov	(Italy) Union Clodiense Chioggia	Loan	8 January 2025	

== Competitions ==
=== Overall record ===
Competition	First match	Last match	Starting round	Final position	Record							
Competition	First match	Last match	Starting round	Final position	Pld	W	D	L	GF	GA	GD	Win %
Serie C	26 August 2024		Matchday 1		21	9	6	6	42	33	+9	42.86
Coppa Italia Serie C	10 August 2024	18 August 2024	First round	Second round	2	1	1	0	2	1	+1	50.00
Total					23	10	7	6	44	34	+10	43.48

Last updated: 4 January 2025
Source: Competitions

=== Serie C ===
==== League table ====
Pos	Team	Pld	W	D	L	GF	GA	GD	Pts	Qualification
2	Audace Cerignola	34	19	10	5	50	32	+18	67	National play-offs 2nd round
3	Monopoli	34	15	12	7	36	25	+11	57	National play-offs 1st round
4	Crotone	34	15	9	10	62	49	+13	54	Group play-offs 2nd round
5	Catania (Note: 1 point deducted due to having presented a late bank guarantee.)	34	14	12	8	49	34	+15	53	Group play-offs 1st round
6	Benevento	34	13	13	8	51	34	+17	52	Group play-offs 1st round

Source: Lega Pro, Soccerway (in English)
Rules for classification: 1) Points; 2) Head-to-head points; 3) Head-to-head goal difference; 4) Goal difference; 5) Goals scored; 6) Lower goals against; 7) Wins; 8) Lower losses; 9) Away wins; 10) Lower home losses.
(Note: Head-to-head record is used only after all the matches between the teams in question have been played)

==== Results summary ====
Overall								Home						Away					
Pld	W	D	L	GF	GA	GD	Pts	W	D	L	GF	GA	GD	W	D	L	GF	GA	GD
0	0	0	0	0	0	0	0	0	0	0	0	0	0	0	0	0	0	0	0

Last updated: August 2024.
Source: Worldfootball

==== Results by round ====
Round	1	2	3	4	5	6	7	8	9	10	11	12	13	14	15	16	17	18	19	20	21
Ground	H	A	H	H	A	H	A	H	A	H	A	H	A	H	A	H	A	H	A	A	H
Result	W	L	L	W	L	L	D	L	D	W	W	D	D	W	W	W	D	L	W	W	D
Position	2	7	13	8	9	14	12	16	14	11	11	11	12	11	9	6	6	9	6	6	

Updated to match(es) played on 4 January 2025. Source: Worldfootball
A = Away; H = Home; W = Win; D = Draw; L = Loss

==== Matches ====
The league schedule was released on 15 July 2024.

26 August 2024 1	Crotone	2–0	Altamura

2 September 2024 2	Cavese	2–1	Crotone

7 September 2024 3	Crotone	1–2	Trapani

14 September 2024 4	Crotone	2–0	Messina

22 September 2024 5	Picerno	5–2	Crotone

25 September 2024 6	Crotone	1–2	Sorrento

29 September 2024 7	Potenza	3–3	Crotone

7 October 2024 8	Crotone	0–4	Avellino

12 October 2024 9	Monopoli	1–1	Crotone

20 October 2024 10	Crotone	2–1	Taranto

27 October 2024 11	Giugliano	1–3	Crotone

31 October 2024 12	Crotone	2–2	Benevento

3 November 2024 13	Audace Cerignola	1–1	Crotone

16 March 2025 32	Crotone	2–1	Audace Cerignola

23 March 2025 33	Catania	0–0	Crotone

29 March 2025 34	Crotone	4–0	Latina

5 April 2025 35	Juventus Next Gen	4–1	Crotone

14 April 2025 36	Crotone	3–2	Foggia

19 April 2025 37	Casertana	2–0	Crotone

26 April 2025 38	Crotone	v	Turris

==== Promotion play-offs ====
===== Group phase second round =====
7 May 2025 First leg	Crotone	0–0	Juventus Next Gen	Crotone
20:00				Stadium: Stadio Ezio Scida

===== First round =====
11 May 2025 First leg	Crotone	3–1	Feralpisalò	Crotone
20:00				Stadium: Stadio Ezio Scida

14 May 2025 Second leg	Feralpisalò	2–1 (3–4 agg.)	Crotone	Salò
20:00				Stadium: Stadio Lino Turina

===== Second round =====
18 May 2025 First leg	Crotone	1–2	Vicenza	Crotone
16:00				Stadium: Stadio Ezio Scida

21 May 2025 Second leg	Vicenza	v (2–1 agg.)	Crotone	Vicenza
20:00

=== Coppa Italia Serie C ===
10 August 2024 First round	Crotone	1–0	Messina
21:00

18 August 2024 Second round	Catania	1–1 (a.e.t.) (6–5 p)	Crotone
21:00
