= Gino Zavanella =

Italian architect and powerboat racer (born 1944)

- Born: 7 November 1944 (age 82); Turin, Italy
- Education: University of Florence
- Occupations: Architect; Powerboat racer
- Known for: Juventus Stadium

Gino Zavanella (born 7 November 1944) is an Italian architect and powerboat racer, specialising in the design of sports venues.

== Biography ==
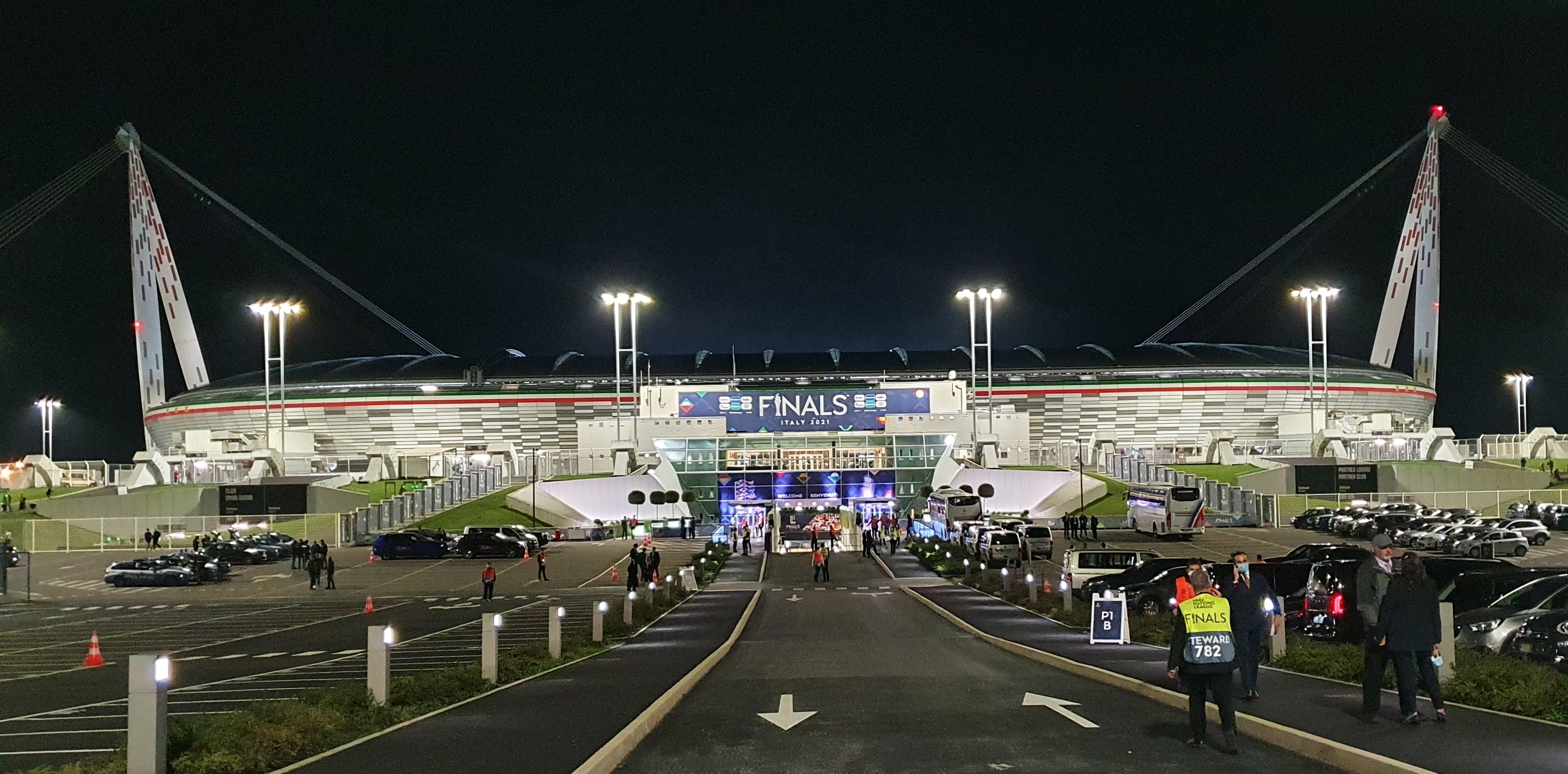
The Juventus Stadium in Turin, one of Zavanella's most prominent projects.

Zavanella graduated in architecture from the University of Florence in 1969 under Pierluigi Spadolini. During his studies, he attended courses taught by Leonardo Savioli and Leonardo Ricci, both of whom he later worked with. Registered with the Italian professional association of architects from 1970, he began his professional career in the early 1970s by founding the GAU practice, and from 1976 worked with architect Alessandro Valenti.

In 1986, he opened a branch of his practice in Rome, focusing on sports architecture, particularly the design of sports facilities. To this end, he founded the engineering company GAU SRL, through which he was also commissioned to complete the final design of the Stadio delle Alpi in Turin and oversee its construction. He also worked with Aldo Rossi and Ron Labinsky on a proposed indoor sports arena in Milan, which was never built. For the 1990 FIFA World Cup, he collaborated with the local organising committee on the design of hospitality areas at San Siro in Milan, Stadio Renzo Barbera in Palermo and Stadio Sant'Elia in Cagliari. Around the same time, he also worked on a stadium project in Venice for FIAT Engineering.

In 1992, he and Valenti established GAU – Architetti Associati, which received several commissions for sports facilities, including the design and construction supervision of Sportilia – Cittadella dello Sport, Stadio Euganeo in Padua, Stadio Lino Turina in Salò and an indoor sports arena in Fossano. Of particular importance was the design of Stadio Euganeo, commissioned directly by the municipality of Padua in 1989. His experience with sports facilities led him to develop an interdisciplinary approach which, with the advice of specialists in sports medicine, athletic trainers and facility managers, sought to reconcile the needs of athletes and spectators with the operational and safety requirements of the buildings.

Alongside his professional work, Zavanella was involved in sports facility planning within sporting institutions. From 1985 to 1992, he headed the sports facilities service of the provincial branch of the Italian National Olympic Committee (CONI) in Mantua. From 1998, he served on the sports facilities commission of the Lega Nazionale Professionisti, and from 1999 on that of the Italian Football Federation. In 1998, Lega Calcio commissioned him to inspect stadiums used for the 1998 FIFA World Cup in France to assess their functionality and safety. In 2000, he carried out similar inspections of venues in Belgium and the Netherlands for UEFA Euro 2000.

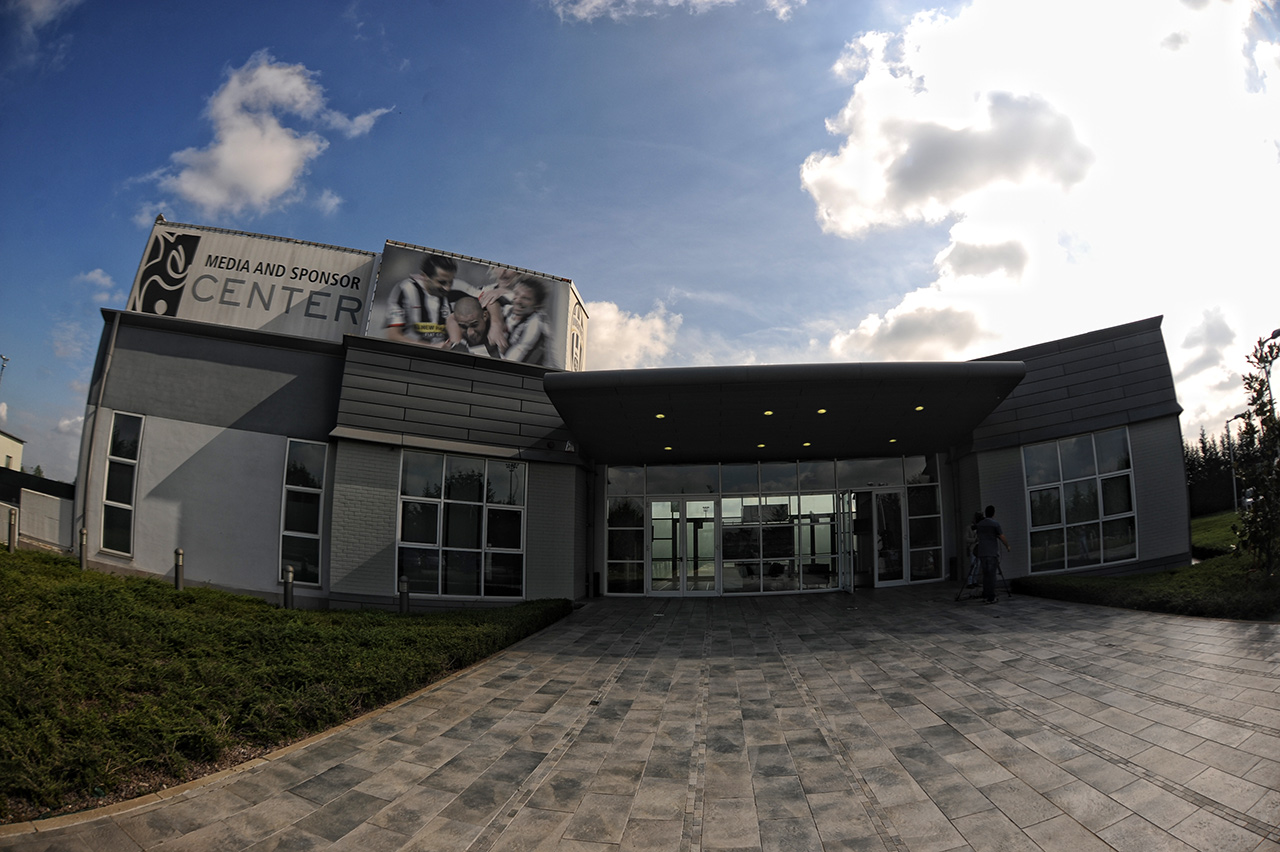
The media area of the Juventus Training Center (Vinovo).

Between 2003 and 2006, he designed and supervised construction of the Juventus Training Center in Vinovo and the Monteboro training centre used by Empoli FC. In 2003, he also served as lead designer for a proposed new Juventus stadium that envisaged retaining and reusing parts of the Stadio delle Alpi, and led a proposal to adapt the Stadio Carlo Castellani for Empoli. From 2004 to 2006, he contributed to plans to expand and redevelop the Stadio Artemio Franchi in Siena and the Stadio Alberto Picco in La Spezia.

In 2006, Zavanella was appointed lead designer and project coordinator for the Juventus Stadium, the club's new stadium in Turin. He was a signatory of the overall detailed design together with Hernando Suárez, while structural engineering and the detailed design of the roof were undertaken by Massimo Majowiecki and Francesco Ossola. In a 2012 interview, Zavanella described his role as the project's team leader and principal signatory within a broader collaboration involving specialists in different areas of design.

Throughout his career, Zavanella advocated transforming stadiums from venues used almost exclusively for sporting events into multifunctional complexes integrated into the urban environment and accessible to the public throughout the week. In his work, he emphasised accessibility and harmony with the surrounding area, with the aim of attracting residents and families and thereby helping to reduce incidents of violence. In a 2017 interview, he identified the age of Italian stadiums and their lack of multifunctional facilities as their main shortcomings.

=== Sporting career ===
Zavanella was also active in competitive sport, initially in motor racing and subsequently, between 1981 and 1992, in powerboat racing, competing in offshore events. He won the world championship in the 3C offshore class in 1983, the Italian championship in the same class in 1984, and the European championship in the 2 offshore class in 1986. The Italian National Olympic Committee awarded him the gold medal for Athletic Valour in 1983 for his world title, a bronze medal in 1984 for his Italian title, and a silver medal in 1986 for his European title.

| Year | Competition | Result | Class |
|---|---|---|---|
| 1983 | World Championship | Gold | 3C Offshore |
| 1984 | Italian Championship | Gold | 3C Offshore |
| 1986 | European Championship | Gold | 2 Offshore |

== Works and projects ==
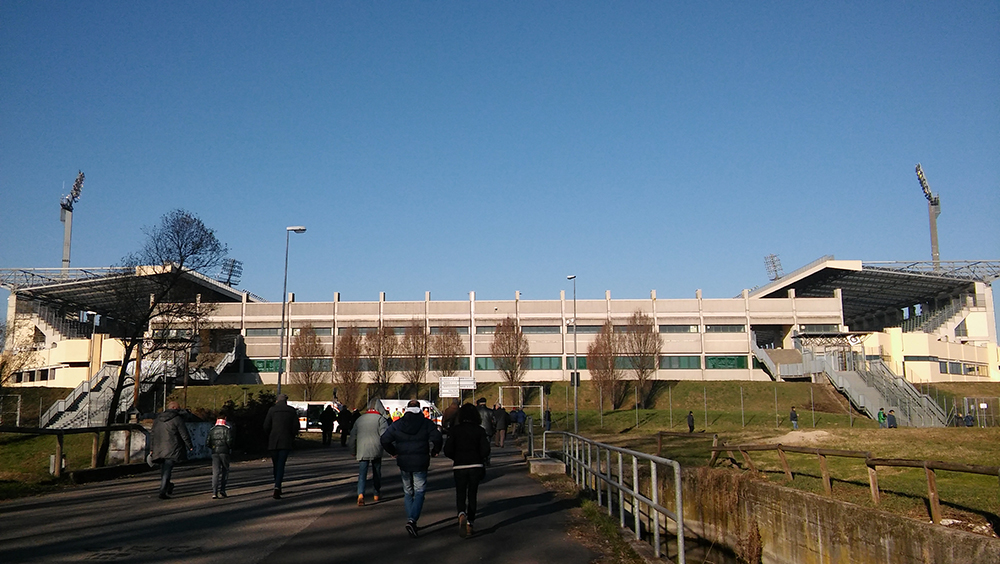
Stadio Euganeo, one of the sports venues designed by Zavanella.

The following is a non-exhaustive list of Zavanella's works and projects:

- Stadio delle Alpi, Turin – final design and construction supervision
- Milan indoor sports arena – with Aldo Rossi and Ron Labinsky; unbuilt
- Hospitality areas at San Siro, Stadio Renzo Barbera and Stadio Sant'Elia for the 1990 FIFA World Cup
- Venice stadium – proposed project
- Sportilia – Cittadella dello Sport
- Stadio Euganeo, Padua
- Stadio Lino Turina, Salò
- Fossano indoor sports arena
- Stadium and indoor arena for the Mediterranean Games in Tunis – winning design in an international competition
- Juventus Training Center (Vinovo), Vinovo (2003–2006)
- Monteboro training centre, Empoli FC (2003–2006)
- Stadio Carlo Castellani, Empoli – redevelopment proposal
- Stadio Artemio Franchi, Siena, and Stadio Alberto Picco, La Spezia – expansion and redevelopment projects (2004–2006)
- Allianz Stadium, Turin (2006–2011) – lead architect
- New Viareggio stadium (2007) – unbuilt
- New Ponsacco stadium (2008) – proposed project
- New Palermo stadium – proposed project
- New AS Roma stadium named after Franco Sensi – proposed project
- New Rijeka stadium, Croatia – proposed project
- Olympic complex in Mostaganem, Algeria
- Hellas Verona FC training centre
- Stadio Renato Dall'Ara, Bologna – redevelopment proposal
- Niccolò Galli Technical Centre, Bologna – expansion

== Bibliography ==
- "Gino Zavanella e le sue architetture". Geocentro/magazine (in Italian). Vol. IV, no. 21. Fondazione Geometri Italiani. May–June 2012.
- Majowiecki, Massimo; Ossola, Francesco; Pinardi, Stefano (2013). "La copertura sospesa del nuovo stadio della Juventus a Torino" (PDF). Inarcos (in Italian). LXVIII (1). Archived from the original (PDF) on 18 June 2025.
