= Giuseppe Milio Voltolina =

Italian poet (1536–1580)

Giuseppe Milio Voltolina, also spelled Mejo Voltolina (1536–1580) was an Italian poet, writing mainly in Latin.

He was born in Salo on the shores of Lake Garda. He was one of the founders in 1564 of the Accademia degli Unanimi. Among his poems are De hortorum cultura libri III' (1574, Brescia), il Miseto, L'Iside, and Hercules Benacensis. His 1574 poem is a didactic yet poetic manual about horticulture, a style similar to that of Virgil's Georgics.
