= Carmine Nunziata =

Italian footballer and manager (born 1967)

Personal information
- Date of birth: 22 July 1967 (age 59)
- Place of birth: San Gennaro Vesuviano, Italy
- Height: 1.67 m (5 ft 6 in)
- Position: Midfielder

Team information
- Current team: Italy U20 (head coach)

Youth career
- Inter Milan

Senior career*
Years	Team	Apps	(Gls)
1985–1986	Inter Milan	0	(0)
1986–1987	Virescit Boccaleone	18	(0)
1987–1989	Pavia	43	(0)
1989–1990	Foggia	36	(0)
1990–1996	Padova	197	(1)
1996–1998	Torino	64	(0)
1998–2000	Brescia	40	(0)
2000–2001	Montichiari	15	(0)
2001	Alzano Virescit	17	(0)
2001–2002	Seregno	21	(0)
2002–2003	Pievigina	21	(0)
Total		472	(1)

Managerial career
- 2003–2006: Arzachena
- 2006–2007: Alghero
- 2007: Salò
- 2008–2009: Arzachena
- 2009: Seregno
- 2010–2011: AC Milan (youth)
- 2012–2017: Italy U21 (assistant)
- 2017–2020: Italy U17
- 2019: Italy U19 (interim)
- 2019: Italy U18 (interim)
- 2020–2022: Italy U19
- 2022–2023: Italy U20
- 2023–2025: Italy U21
- 2025–: Italy U20
- * Club domestic league appearances and goals

Carmine Nunziata (born 22 July 1967) is an Italian football manager and former player who played as a midfielder, currently in charge of the Italy Under-20 national team.

== Playing career ==
Born in San Gennaro Vesuviano, Nunziata played youth football for Inter Milan. He made his first team debut on 6 May 1986, coming on as a half-time substitute for Cristiano Pozzoni in a 2–0 Coppa Italia away loss against Roma.

After only one further cup match for Inter, Nunziata left for Serie C1 side Virescit Boccaleone in 1986. He moved to fellow league team Pavia in the following year, suffering relegation to Serie C2 in his first season.

In 1989, Nunziata signed for Foggia in the Serie B. He moved to Padova in the same division in the following year, achieving promotion to the Serie A in 1994.

In 1996, Nunziata agreed to a contract with Torino in the second level, and featured regularly before moving to Brescia in 1998. In 2000, after losing his starting spot, he joined Montichiari in the fourth tier.

In 2001, after a short period at Alzano Virescit, Nunziata joined Seregno in the Serie D. He subsequently played for Pievigina in the same division, and retired with the club in 2003 at the age of 36.

== Managerial career ==
Immediately after retiring, Nunziata started his managerial career with Arzachena in the Serie D. He was subsequently in charge of Alghero and Salò before returning to Arzachena in 2008.

On 26 June 2009, Nunziata was appointed in charge of Seregno, with the club now in the Eccellenza Lombardy, but was sacked on 25 September. He worked in the youth sides of AC Milan during the 2010–11 season, before being named assistant of Devis Mangia in the Italy national under-21 team.

Nunziata continued to work as an assistant of the under-21 side in the following years, now behind Luigi Di Biagio. On 4 August 2017, he was appointed in charge of the under-17 team.

In 2019, Nunziata was an interim manager of both the under-19 and under-18 sides, being in charge of the former in the 2019 UEFA European Under-19 Championship. After returning to the under-17s, he was appointed manager of the under-19 team in July 2020.

On 22 July 2022, Nunziata took over the under-20 team, changing roles with Alberto Bollini. In the 2023 FIFA U-20 World Cup, he led Italy to the final, as the team eventually lost to Uruguay.

After the tournament, on 4 August 2023 he was appointed as the new under-21 team manager, replacing Paolo Nicolato. He left his role in July 2025, by the end of his contract, being replaced by Silvio Baldini, successively returning in charge of the Under-20 team.

== Honours ==
=== Manager ===
Italy U20

- FIFA U-20 World Cup runner-up: 2023
