= Juventus Stadium =

Football stadium in Turin, Italy

Allianz Stadium
- Juventus Stadium
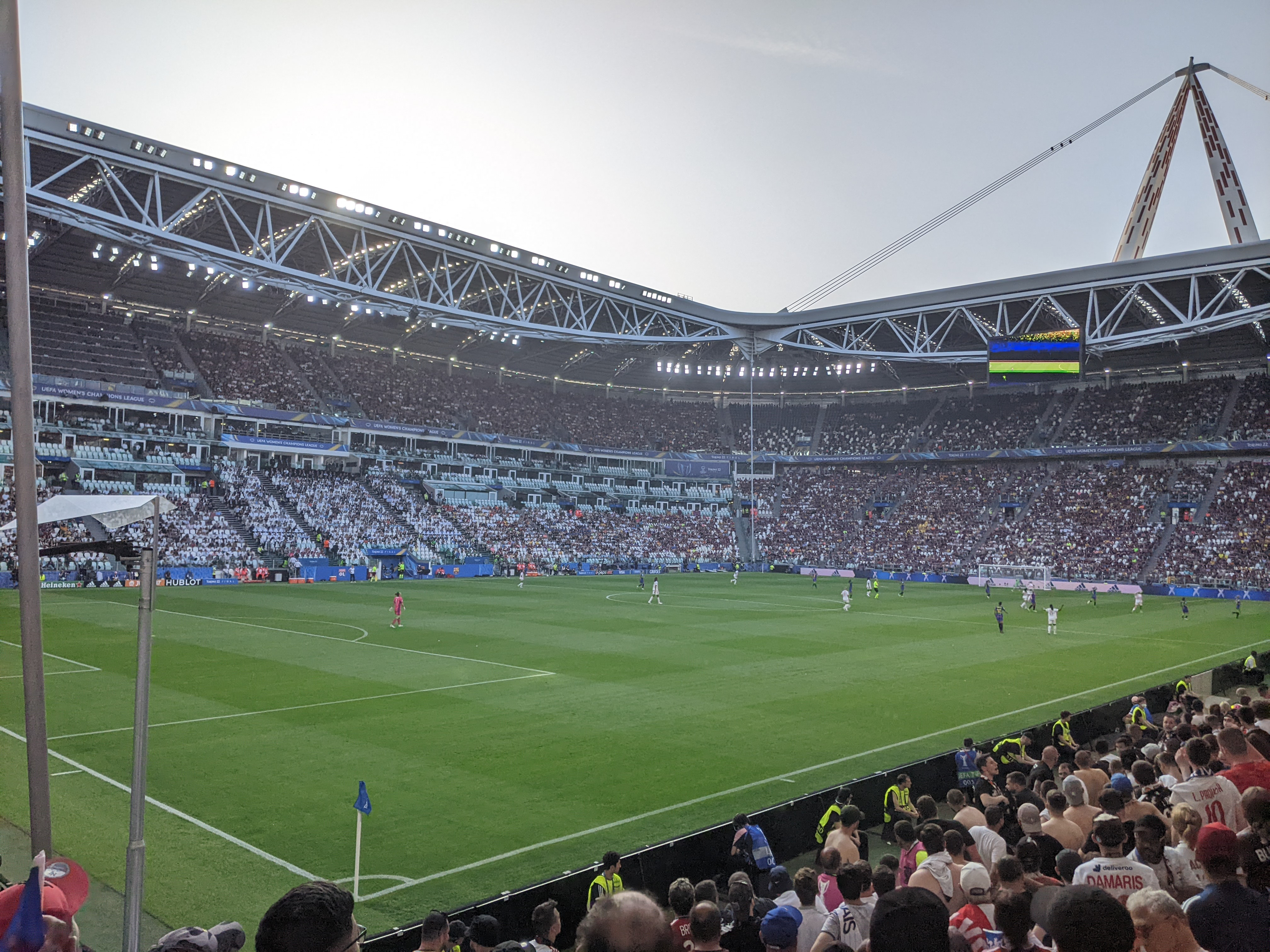
- UEFA
- Interactive map of Allianz Stadium
- Address: Corso Gaetano Scirea 50, 10151
- Location: Turin, Italy
- Coordinates: 45°6′34″N 7°38′28″E
- Owner: Juventus Football Club S.p.A.
- Operator: Juventus Football Club S.p.A.
- Capacity: 41,689
- Executive suites: 84
- Surface: Grass
- Scoreboard: LCD
- Record attendance: 41,691 vs. Napoli (1 November 2026, Serie A)
- Field size: 105 m × 68 m (344 ft × 223 ft)
- Public transit: Rigola Stadio; 9/ Stadio; 72, VE1 Stadio; 62, 75 Altessano

Construction
- Groundbreaking: June 2009
- Built: 2009–2011
- Opened: 8 September 2011
- Cost: €155 million
- Architects: Hernando Suárez; Gino Zavanella; Giorgetto Giugiaro
- Structural engineers: Francesco Ossola; Massimo Majowiecki

Tenants
- Juventus FC (2011–present); Italy national football team (selected matches)

Juventus Stadium (Italian pronunciation: [juˈvɛntus ˈstaːdjum]), known for sponsorship reasons as the Allianz Stadium since July 2017, sometimes simply known in Italy as the Stadium (Italian: Lo Stadium), is an all-seater football stadium in the Vallette borough of Turin, Italy, and the home of Juventus. The stadium was built on the site of its former ground, the Stadio delle Alpi in the latter 2000s, and is the first club-owned football modern venue in the country. It is also one of only four stadiums in Italy accredited with the UEFA Category 4, which have the highest technical level in the confederation's Stadium Infrastructure Regulations, alongside the San Siro, the Stadio Olimpico di Roma and the Stadio Olimpico Grande Torino. It was opened at the start of the 2011–12 season and, with 41,689 spectators, it is the sixth largest football stadium in Italy by seating capacity, as well the first in Piedmont.

The first football structure to be built in post-modern style and the first without architectural barriers in the country, Juventus played the first match in the stadium on 8 September 2011 against the world's oldest professional football club Notts County, in a friendly which ended 1–1; Luca Toni scored the first goal. The first competitive match was against Parma three days later, where Stephan Lichtsteiner scored the stadium's first competitive goal in the 16th minute. Juventus only lost three of their first 100 league matches at the Juventus Stadium.

The stadium hosted the 2014 UEFA Europa League final and the 2021 UEFA Nations League Finals. Also, it hosted the 2022 UEFA Women's Champions League final. In its area there are some other structures related with the club such as the J-Museum, the J-Medical and a concept store, as well as a shopping center.

== Background ==
Juventus' previous permanent home ground, the Stadio delle Alpi, was completed in 1990 to host matches for the 1990 World Cup. The club's move from their previous ancestral home, the Stadio Comunale, to the Stadio delle Alpi was controversial. The new stadium was built at a great expense, was relatively less accessible, and had poor sightlines due to the athletics track. Despite Juventus being the best-supported team in Italy (with the highest television subscribers and away section attendances), attendance at the Stadio delle Alpi was dismal. Average attendance was only a third of the stadium's 67,000 capacity. The club bought the stadium from the local council in 2002, a decision which was popular with fans. Antonio Giraudo, CEO of the Club between 1994 and 2006, committed the project to the architect Gino Zavanella; the initial project already included features that would be typical of the final version, such as nearly halving the oversized capacity of the Delle Alpi and the elimination of the athletics track.

Juventus moved out of the unpopular stadium after the 2006 Winter Olympics were held in the city and began plans to build a more intimate and atmospheric venue. During that period, they played their matches at the newly renovated Stadio Olimpico, which was also unpopular due to its low capacity. In November 2008, the club unveiled plans for a new 41,000-seater stadium on the site of the Stadio delle Alpi. The new stadium, built at a cost of €155 million, features modern executive boxes, among other new developments. The completion of Juventus Stadium made Juventus the only Serie A club to build and own their stadium at the time. Then-club chairman Giovanni Cobolli Gigli described the stadium as "a source of great pride".

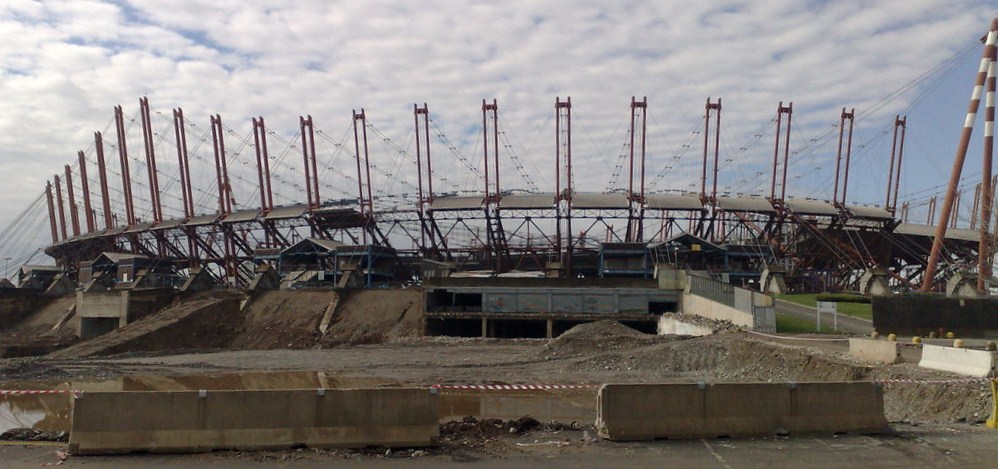
The demolition of the previous Stadio delle Alpi.

The financing of the project was contributed by the advanced payment from Sportfive for €35 million, a loan of €50 million (later increased to €60 million) from Istituto per il Credito Sportivo, and a land sales to Nordiconad for €20.25 million.

== Development ==
=== Environmental compatibility ===
The construction project aimed to ensure a low environmental impact of the work of the construction site via the use of advanced environmentally sustainable technologies. This stadium is constructed to reduce energy consumption from non-renewable energy sources by reducing waste and optimising the resources available. The stadium can produce the electricity it needs using solar energy captured through photovoltaic panels; it produces warm water which heats rooms, changing rooms, kitchens and the football field through a network of district heating, heats hot water for the dressing rooms and kitchens of restaurants using solar thermal systems. These alternative energy sources are aimed at helping the stadium meet the criteria dictated by the Kyoto Protocol by generating multiple results:

- Reductions of greenhouse gases
- No air pollution
- No risk of fire
- Integration with district heating
- Containment of waste
- Intensive exploitation of solar energy through solar tracker tools
- No production of chemical or acoustic emissions
- Reuse of rainwater
- Reduction of at least 50% of water needed for irrigation of the field

All the concrete from the old Stadio delle Alpi demolition has been separated and reused for the new building; other materials left have been divided into types, to be recycled, resold or reused throughout the new stadium's construction. The reinforced concrete used for the steps has been crushed down and reused as a supporting layer of the soil, with almost 40,000 m^{3} (52,000 cu yd) of concrete put towards the construction of the new stadium's foundations. Around 6,000 tons of steel, aluminium and copper were recovered, the re-use of which provided savings of more than €1 million. The implementation of this sustainable construction policy has ensured a global savings of approximately €2.3 million.

=== Naming rights ===
Juventus signed an agreement with Sportfive Italia which gave the company "exclusive naming and partial promotional and sponsorship rights for the new stadium". In the agreement, Sportfive was given the rights to the name of the stadium from 2011 to 2023 for €75 million and to market the sky boxes and VIP seats.

Since 1 July 2017, the Juventus Stadium is known commercially as the Allianz Stadium (in Turin) until 30 June 2030.

=== Inauguration ===
One of the first sporting structures, as well as the first football ground, to be built in post-modern style in the country, the opening ceremony of the stadium was held on 8 September 2011, with a friendly match against Notts County, chosen as Juventus' black and white stripes were inspired by County's jersey colours. The game ended 1–1 with goals from Luca Toni and Lee Hughes in the second half. In return, Notts County extended an invitation to Juventus for a return match at Meadow Lane in 2012 to celebrate County's 150th anniversary.

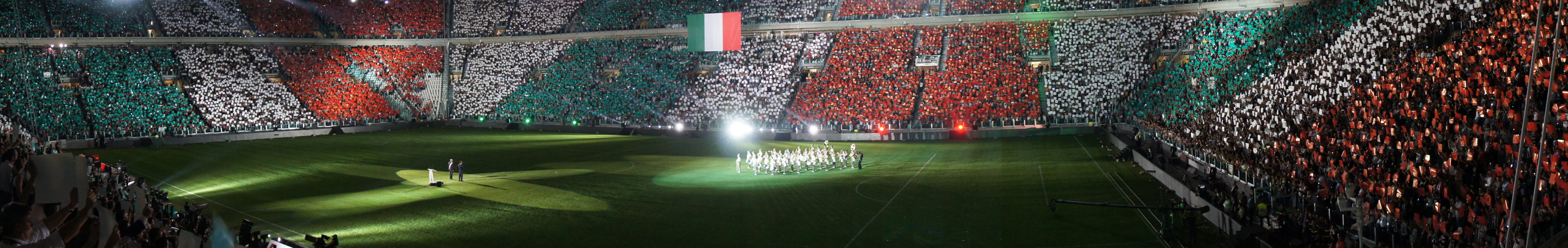
A panorama overview of the Juventus Stadium during its opening ceremony.

== Services and facilities ==
=== Juventus Premium Club ===
The stadium includes 3,600 premium seats and 64 sky boxes. Services for the club include reserved entrance to the stadium, luxury armchairs with personal LCD televisions, exclusive restaurants, bars, lounges, finger food at half time and after the game, reserved parking, access to the museum (starting in 2012).

The Juventus Premium Club is the Juventus corporate hospitality project, aimed at companies who wish to entertain their clients and partners to lunch or dinner at the Juventus stadium before the match.

In addition, the stadium houses a 34,000-m^{2} shopping complex open every day and parking space for 4,000 vehicles. The Juventus Museum is located nearby.

=== Stadium tour ===
A 70-minute guided tour of the stadium is offered every day. Guests are taken around to see the dressing rooms, facilities, museum and the pitch. The tours were initiated in November 2011 and the first tour was led by former Juventus player and current board member Pavel Nedvěd. Audio guides are also available to foreign visitors in English, French, German and Spanish.

=== Area12 Shopping Centre ===
On 27 October 2011, Area 12, a shopping centre adjacent to the stadium was opened. It has over 60 shops, two bars, three restaurants and the first Conad store to feature a drive-through service, allowing customers to do their shopping online and collect their pre-packed goods. The new Juventus Store, at 550 square metres, is the biggest sports club shop in the country. It was designed by Giugiaro and architect Alberto Rolla.

The shopping centre has 2,000 parking spaces, of which 800 are covered, and was provided by San Sisto (sole owner), a company which sees the agreement between Nordiconad from Modena, the Northern Italy Cooperative of Gruppo Conad, Cmb from Carpi and Unieco from Reggio Emilia, two Italian companies in the field of shopping centre building.

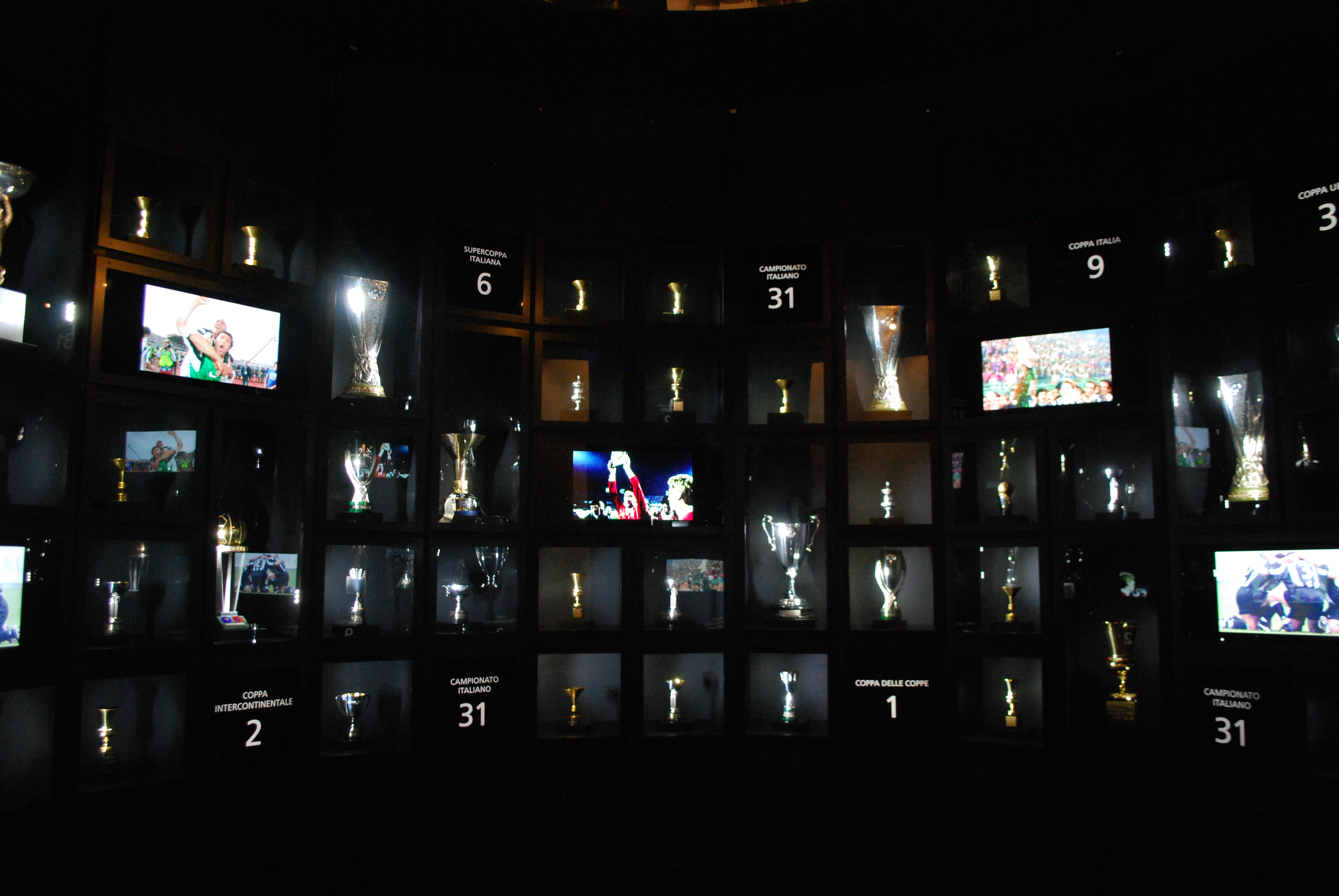
A partial view of the club's trophy room at J-Museum.

=== J-Museum ===
The Juventus Museum, called the J-Museum, was unveiled on 16 May 2012 by club president Andrea Agnelli and museum chairman Paolo Gamberti and opened to the public the following day. A noted feature is the extensive use of technology to provide a different approach to the traditional concept of a museum. The museum is chaired by noted Italian journalist Paolo Garimberti, who was previously a journalist and correspondent for La Stampa, La Repubblica and CNN Italia.

The museum has been a popular point of interest with visitors to the stadium. Just four months after opening to the public, it has recorded some 40,000 visitors. In November 2012, the museum's management announced a partnership with two popular local attractions, the National Museum of Cinema and Reggia di Venaria, to offer a discounted ticket package for visitors.

=== J-Medical ===
On 23 March 2016, Juventus introduced its new medical centre, J-Medical, as a result of a collaboration between the club and Santa Clara Group. The medical centre is situated in the stadium's east stand, next to J-Museum. Housed within a 3500 m^{2} facility, the centre houses specialist clinics, operating theatres for outpatient surgery and a rehabilitation centre. In addition to providing affordable and efficient healthcare for the local community, the medical centre also serves as the club's in-house clinic for conducting players' medical check-ups.

On 13 June 2016, Miralem Pjanić completed his medical ahead of a proposed move from Roma. This was the first time that J-Medical had held routine check-ups for prospective Juventus players.

== Events ==
=== Stadium Business Summit 2012 ===
Juventus Stadium hosted the Stadium Business Awards held in May 2012.

=== 2014 UEFA Europa League Final ===
On 20 March 2012, UEFA announced that the Juventus Stadium would host the 2014 UEFA Europa League Final. This was the first time the city of Turin hosted a final of a UEFA club competition. Sevilla of Spain beat Benfica of Portugal on penalties after a goalless draw.

=== 2021 UEFA Nations League Finals ===
On 3 December 2020, UEFA announced that the Juventus Stadium would be one of two venues to host matches of the 2021 UEFA Nations League Finals.

=== 2022 UEFA Women's Champions League Final ===
On 2 March 2020, UEFA announced that the Juventus Stadium would host the 2022 UEFA Women's Champions League Final.

=== Rugby Union ===
Whilst traditionally a football stadium, Juventus Stadium has also hosted select Italian international rugby union test matches. Rugby union first debuted at the venue in 2024, when Italy played host to the All Blacks.

International rugby union fixtures
Date	Local time	Team 1	Score	Team 2	Competition	Attendance	Ref.
23 November 2024	21:10	Italy	11–29	New Zealand	2024 Autumn Nations Series	40,732	
15 November 2025	13:40	Italy	14–32	South Africa	2025 Autumn Nations Series	32,103	
7 November 2026	12:40	Italy		South Africa	2026 Nations Championship		

== Related developments ==
=== Continassa Project ===
On 1 June 2010 Juventus acquired a 99-year leasehold on the 270,860 m^{2} Continassa area (50 years for some minor parties) from the Turin city council for €1 million with the aim to redevelop over ten years with a series of projects and an investment of at least €60 million. The agreement was initially announced on 15 March 2011 and signed by the end of 2011.

The project includes, among others, the construction of the future headquarters of the club – which will be built in the Continassa, the club has pledged to construct a Juventus Soccer School (the school football team Juventus) and will also build hotels. On 22 December 2012, the master plan of the whole Continassa area was approved by the city council of Turin.

On 14 June 2013, a final contract was signed for €11.7 million, which Juventus acquired a 99-year renewable lease hold of 180,000 square metre of area, while the city council retained some area in Continassa. On 22 July 2014 Piano Esecutivo Convenzionato proposed by Juventus was approved.

The project was later renamed as J-Village.

=== J-Village ===
On 16 October 2015, Juventus officially announced the new project of J-Village. It reformed the previous Continassa Project and continued development in Continassa area. J-Village comprised development of six sites: the JTC (Juventus Training Center), the first-team training facility which would also house the Media Center; the new Juventus Head Office; the J-Hotel; the ISE International School (part of J-College); the Concept Store. A power station and the service infrastructure for the whole area would complete the development. The operational plan was expected for the completion by the end of June 2017. On 17 July 2017, Juventus announced that the new Juventus head office was opened. On 24 August 2019, Juventus announced the opening of the four-star 138-room J-Hotel; Juventus own 40 percent of the hotel, with the other 60 percent belonging to the Lindbergh Hotels group.

Juventus ceded the development rights of the area to a private equity fund The J-Village Property Fund. The transaction included the ownership over an area of approximately 148,700 square meters and the related planning permission for 34,830 square meters of gross floor area at a total value of €24.1 million. Therefore, Juventus received shares in the J-Village Fund worth €24.1 million and be a Fund shareholder. The J-Village Property Fund was managed by an asset management company Accademia SGR. The Fund's overall investment was above €100 million, entirely covered by various private investors which were handled by Accademia SGR for a total of €53.8 million, and financing granted by UBI Banca (50%) and UniCredit (50%), for a maximum of €64.5 million.

== Bibliography ==
- Doidge, Mark (2015). Football Italia: Italian Football in an Age of Globalization. London: Bloomsbury Publishing. ISBN 978-14-72-51921-4.

Preceded by Amsterdam Arena; Amsterdam	UEFA Europa League; Final venue 2014	Succeeded by National Stadium; Warsaw
Preceded by Gamla Ullevi; Gothenburg	UEFA Women's Champions League; Final venue 2022	Succeeded by Viola Park; Vienna
Preceded by Estádio do Dragão; Estádio D. Afonso Henriques	UEFA Nations League; Finals venue 2021 with San Siro	Succeeded by De Kuip; De Grolsch Veste
