= Santa Maria Annunziata, Salò =

Church in Lombardy, Italy

Santa Maria Annunziata
- Duomo di Salò
- Façade (west front) of the church
- Santa Maria Annunziata
- 45°36′24″N 10°31′53″E
- Country: Italy
- Denomination: Roman Catholic

Architecture
- Architect: Filippo delle Vacche
- Architectural type: Late Gothic
- Years built: 1453 -

Administration
- Archdiocese: Diocese of Brescia

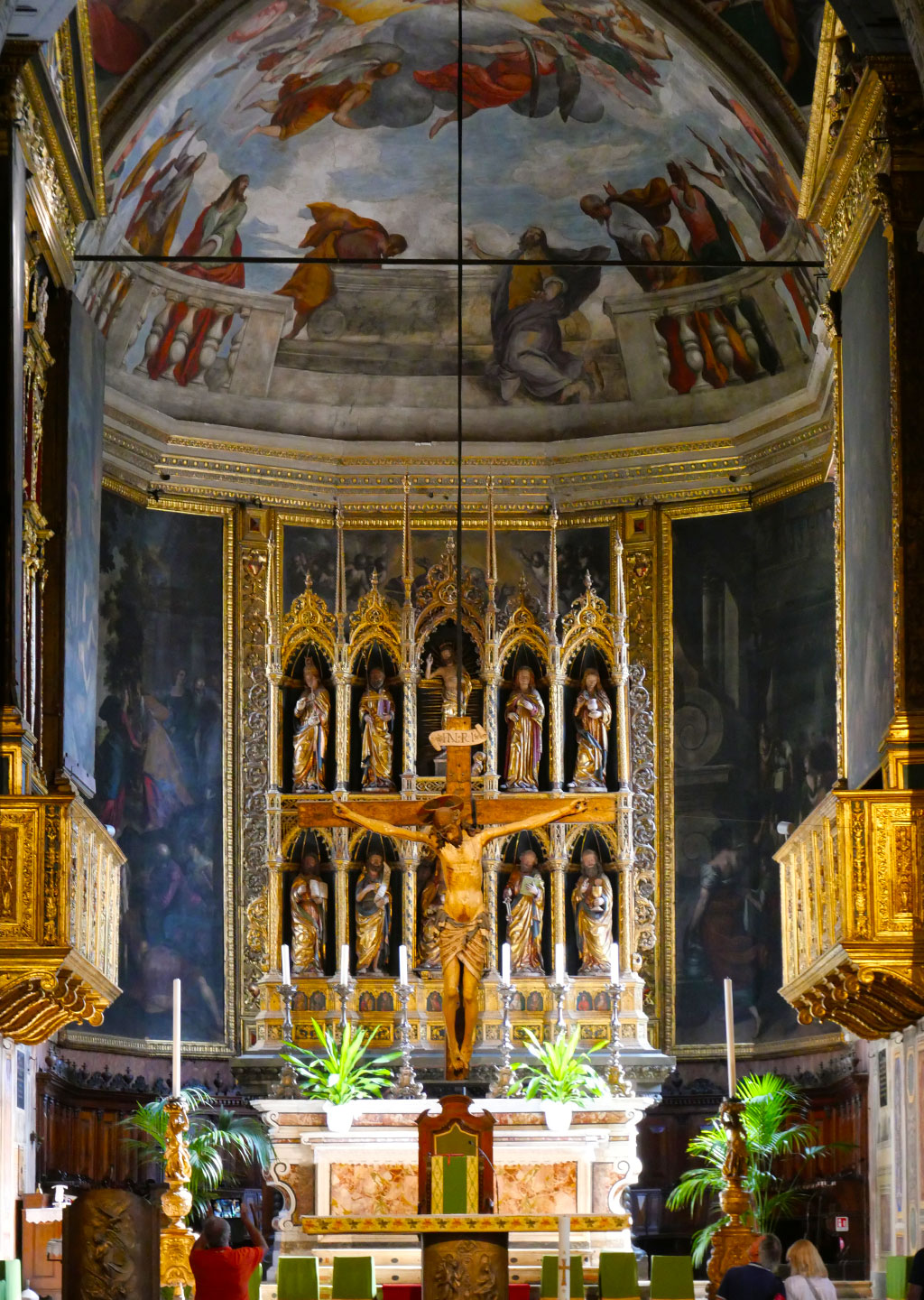
Main altar in Salò Cathedral with the altarpiece by Pietro Bussolo

Santa Maria Annunziata (Italian: Chiesa di Santa Maria Annunziata; Duomo di Salò) is the main religious building (duomo) of the town of Salò, Italy.

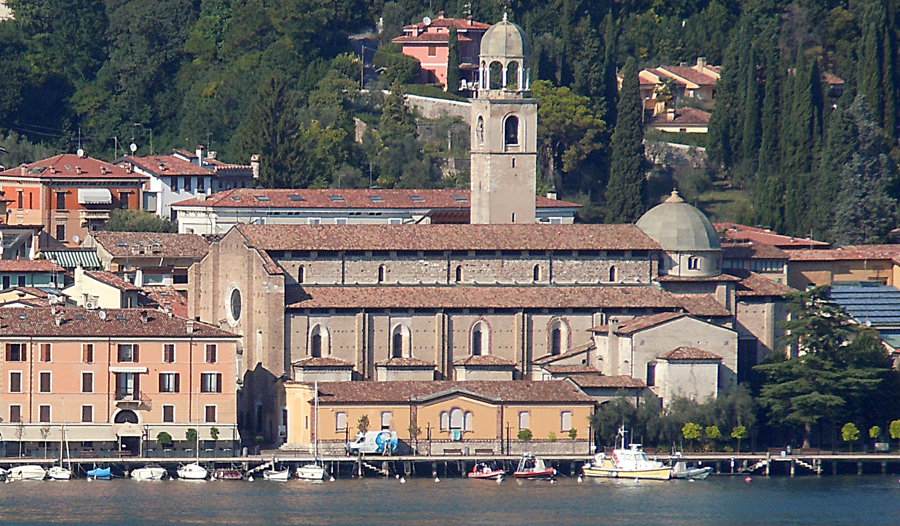
The church seen from the lake

== History ==
The construction of the church, dedicated to the Annunciation of the Virgin Mary, was begun in 1453 by the architect Filippo delle Vacche of Caravaggio, Lombardy. It is built in the Late Gothic style to replace the previous edifice that stood at the site. Its façade remains unfinished.

== Important works ==
The church preserves within it paintings by Romanino, Moretto da Brescia, Zenone Veronese and Paolo Veneziano. There is a grand polyptych of gilded wood dating from 1510. There are frescoes executed by Antonio Vassilacchi dating from 1602.

=== Conserved paintings ===
- The Madonna and Saints Bonaventura and Sebastiano, c. 1517, oil on board, by Romanino.
- Anthony of Padua and a donor, 1529, oil on canvas, by Romanino.
- Lamentation over the dead Christ, and Apostles, between 1484 (Verona) and 1554 (Salò), oil on panel, Zenone Veronese.

== Entry portal ==
The main entrance into the church is through the great portal executed between 1506 and 1508 by Gasparo Cairano and Antonio Mangiacavalli, who were among the chief exponents of Renaissance sculpture in Brescia.

== See also ==
- Ibsen, Monica (1999). Il duomo di Salò. Gussago.
- Mucchi, Anton Maria (1932). Il duomo di Salò. Bologna.
