= Stadio Lino Turina =

Multi-use stadium in Salò, Italy

Coordinates: 45°36′14.2″N 10°30′47.1″E

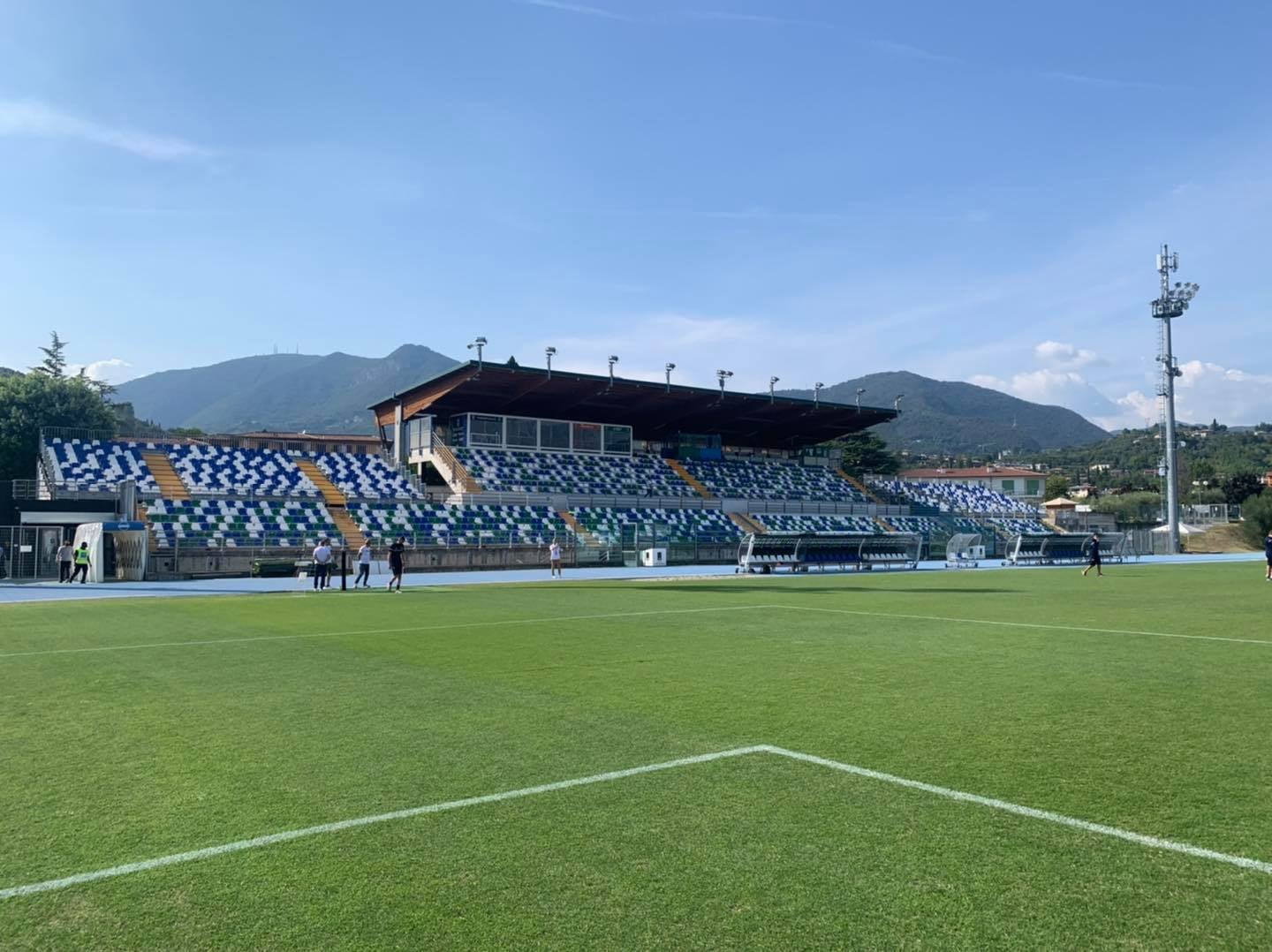
- Interactive map of Stadio Lino Turina
- Location: Salò, Italy
- Owner: Comune of Salò
- Capacity: 2,364
- Surface: Grass

Construction
- Opened: 1963

Tenants
- A.C. Salò (1985–2009); FeralpiSalò (2009–2025)

Stadio Lino Turina is a multi-purpose stadium (and the main outdoor arena) in the city of Salò, Brescia, in Lombardy, Italy. It is currently used mostly for football matches. The stadium holds 2,364 people.

Built in 1963, the facility is named after Lino Turina, a nurse from Salò who was particularly active in promoting football in his hometown.

== Structure and location ==
Around the pitch there is an eight-lane athletics track certified as Class A according to FIDAL standards, renovated in 2017 at a cost of €334,000 co-funded by the Lombardy regional government and the municipality of Salò.

== Issues ==
In 2012, due to the stadium not meeting the standards required to participate in the Lega Pro Prima Divisione championship (which at the time required a minimum capacity of 4,000 seats), Feralpisalò was forced to move to Stadio Mario Rigamonti in Brescia. However, the subsequent granting of an exemption before the start of the championship allowed the club to return to the Turina.

In October 2012 the stadium was equipped with the surveillance system required by the league, with cameras operating 24 hours a day. After the reform of the leagues, Serie C introduced a minimum stadium capacity of approximately 1,500 seats, effectively resolving the issue for the Turina.

The structural inadequacy issue resurfaced in 2023 following Feralpisalò’s promotion to Serie B, which requires stadiums to have a minimum capacity of 5,500 seats, with possible exemptions slightly above 3,000. Pending a possible renovation, the club opted to move to Stadio Leonardo Garilli in Piacenza.
