= Antonio Mangiacavalli =

Italian Renaissance sculptor

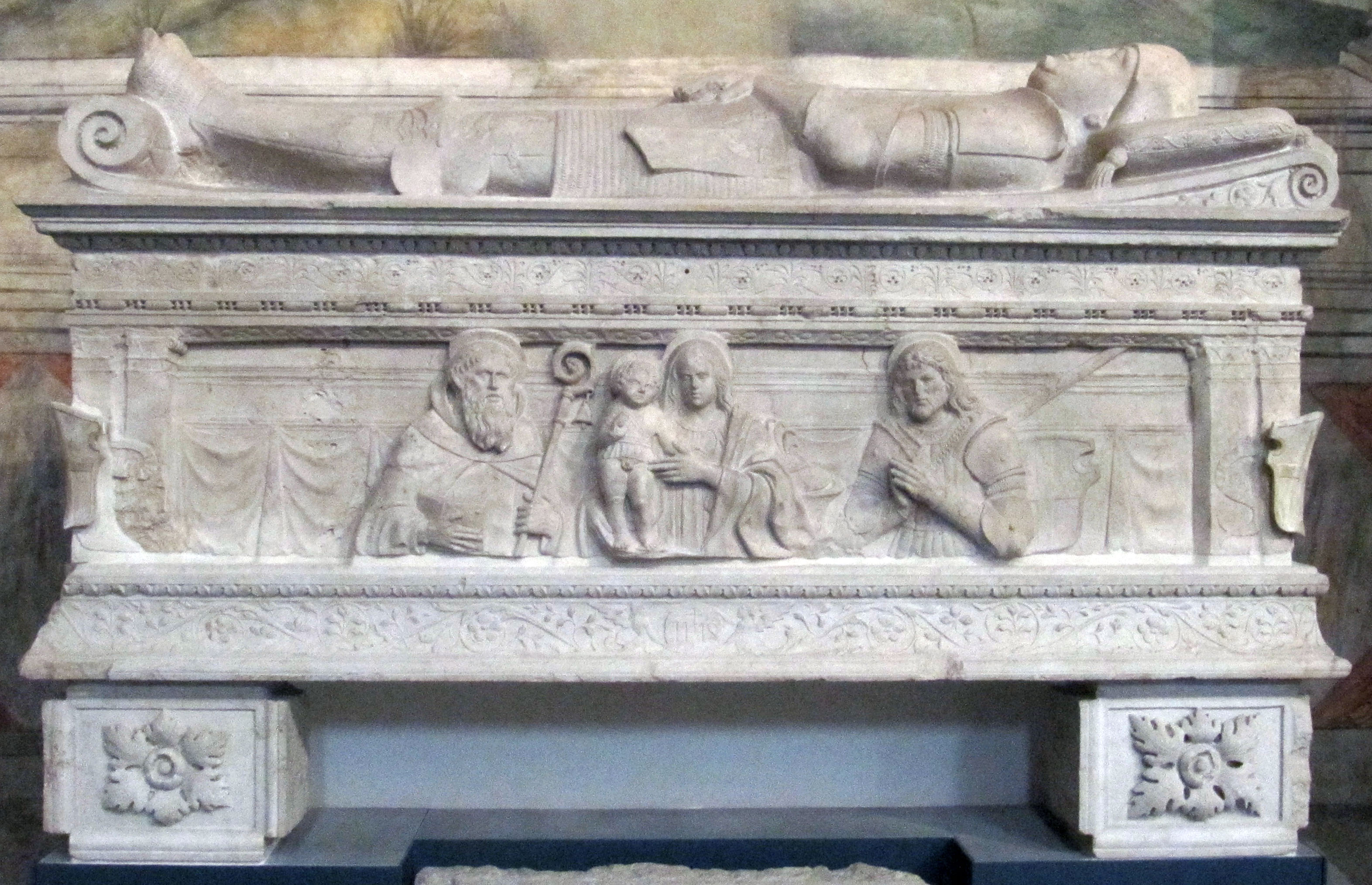
- Antonio Mangiacavalli, Tomb of Nicolò Orsini, first decade of 16th century, Santa Giulia Museum, Brescia
- Born: 15th century Como, Duchy of Milan
- Died: 16th century
- Notable work: Tomb of Nicolò Orsini

Antonio Mangiacavalli (fl. 16th century) was an Italian sculptor of the Renaissance.

Born in Como, Antonio Mangiacavalli was active in Brescia between the 15th and 16th centuries.

He is best known for his funerary monument of Nicolò Orsini, a condottiero, created in the 16th century and preserved at the Santa Giulia Museum in Brescia. His best documented work is the entry portal of the Duomo of Salò, executed between 1506 and 1508 in collaboration with Gasparo Cairano.

== Bibliography ==
- Matteo Ceriana (2007). Tullio Lombardo: scultore e architetto nella Venezia del Rinascimento : atti del Convegno di studi, Venezia, Fondazione Giorgio Cini, 4-6 aprile 2006. Cierre. ISBN 978-88-8314-452-3.
