= AC Feralpi Lonato =

Italian football club

- Full name: Associazione Calcio; Feralpi Lonato
- Founded: 1980
- Dissolved: 2009
- Ground: Centro Sportivo 3 Stelle, Desenzano del Garda, Italy
- 2008-09: Serie D/D, 6th
| Home colours | Away colours |

Associazione Calcio Feralpi Lonato was an Italian football club located in Lonato del Garda, Lombardy, but played in Desenzano del Garda, Lombardy. Its colors were white and green.

In summer 2009 the club merged with A.C. Salò of Salò, making as Feralpisalò.

== History ==
The club was founded in summer 1980, as A.C. Lonato and so renamed on 1985, from the merger between two clubs of the city:

- A.C. Feralpi Lonato, just promoted in Serie D and founded in 1963 as A.C. Pejo Lonato, became A.C. Lonato in 1969 and so renamed in 1973
- A.S. Lonato, from Terza Categoria.

It played in Serie D until 1982, when relegated in Promotion and there returned only in 2007 winning Eccellenza Lombardy, for another two years before the merger with A.C. Salò.
