= Feralpisalò =

Italian football club located in Salò, Lombardy, Italy

- Full name: Feralpisalò Srl
- Nicknames: I Leoni del Garda (The Lions of Lake Garda); Gardesani / Benacensi (People from Lake Garda); Verdazzurri (The Green and Light Blues); Verdeblù (The Green and Blues)
- Founded: 2009; 17 years ago
- Dissolved: 17 July 2025; 15 months ago
- Ground: Stadio Lino Turina, Salò, Italy
- Capacity: 2,364
- 2024–25: Serie C Group A, 3rd of 20
- Website: feralpisalo.it
Home colours	Away colours	Third colours

Feralpisalò was an Italian association football club located in Salò, Lombardy, and representing also the nearby town of Lonato del Garda. The club last played in Serie C, until 2025.

== History ==
The club was founded in summer 2009, from the merger between two clubs, both of Serie D:

- A.C. Salò of Salò, founded in 1985, as A.C. Salò Benaco, and so renamed since 2001,
- A.C. Feralpi Lonato of Lonato del Garda, founded in 1980, as A.C. Lonato and so renamed since 1985.

On 12 August 2009 the club was admitted to Lega Pro Seconda Divisione in place of not admitted Pistoiese.

In the season 2010–11 from Lega Pro Seconda Divisione group A, the club gained promotion to Lega Pro Prima Divisione via the playoffs, for the first time ever.

On 8 April 2023, following a 1–0 home win to Triestina, Feralpisalò mathematically won the Group A title with two games still to go, ensuring themselves a historic first promotion to Serie B.

The club ceased to exist in 2025, following its relocation to Brescia and change of denomination to Union Brescia.

== Stadium ==
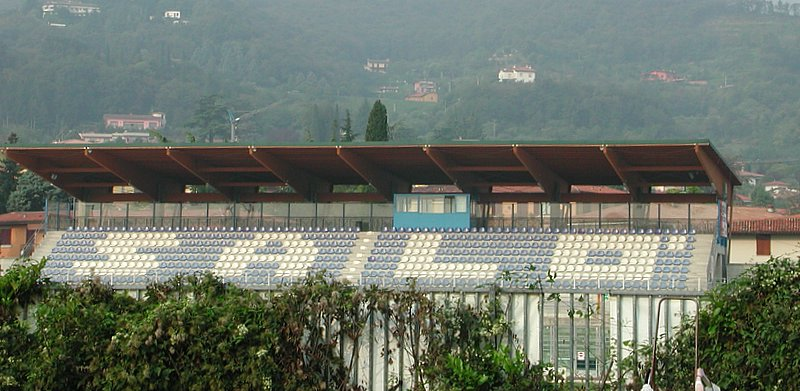
Stadio Lino Turina

Feralpisalò's home stadium is Stadio Lino Turina in the city of Salò. The club, however, played their home games in the 2023–24 Serie B season at the Stadio Leonardo Garilli of Piacenza, as Stadio Lino Turina did not fulfill the stadium requirements for Serie B games.

== Colours and badge ==
Its colours are blue and green: representing Salò and Feralpi Lonato.

== Honours ==
=== Leagues ===
- Serie C

Winner (1): 2022–23 (Group A)
