= AC Salò =

Italian football club

- Full name: Associazione Calcio Salò
- Founded: 1985
- Dissolved: 2009
- Ground: Stadio Lino Turina, Salò, Italy
- Capacity: 1 550
- 2008-09: Serie D/D, 4th
Home colours	Away colours

Associazione Calcio Salò was an Italian football club located in Salò, Lombardy. Its colors were white and blue.

In summer 2009 the club merged with A.C. Feralpi Lonato of Lonato del Garda, making as Feralpisalò.

== History ==
The club was founded in summer 1985, as A.C. Salò Benaco and so renamed on 2001, from the merger between two clubs of the city:

- A.C. Salò, founded in 1974 as F.C. Real Plaza Salò and so renamed in 1979, from Prima Categoria
- A.C. Benaco Salò, founded in 1963 as A.C. Benaco, became A.C. Salò in 1969 and so renamed in 1974, from Seconda Categoria.

It played in Serie D winning in 2004 Eccellenza Lombardy and the Coppa Italia Dilettanti, until the merger with A.C. Feralpi Lonato.

== Honours ==
- Coppa Italia Dilettanti
  - Winners: 2003–04
