= Salò =

- Comune
- Città di Salò
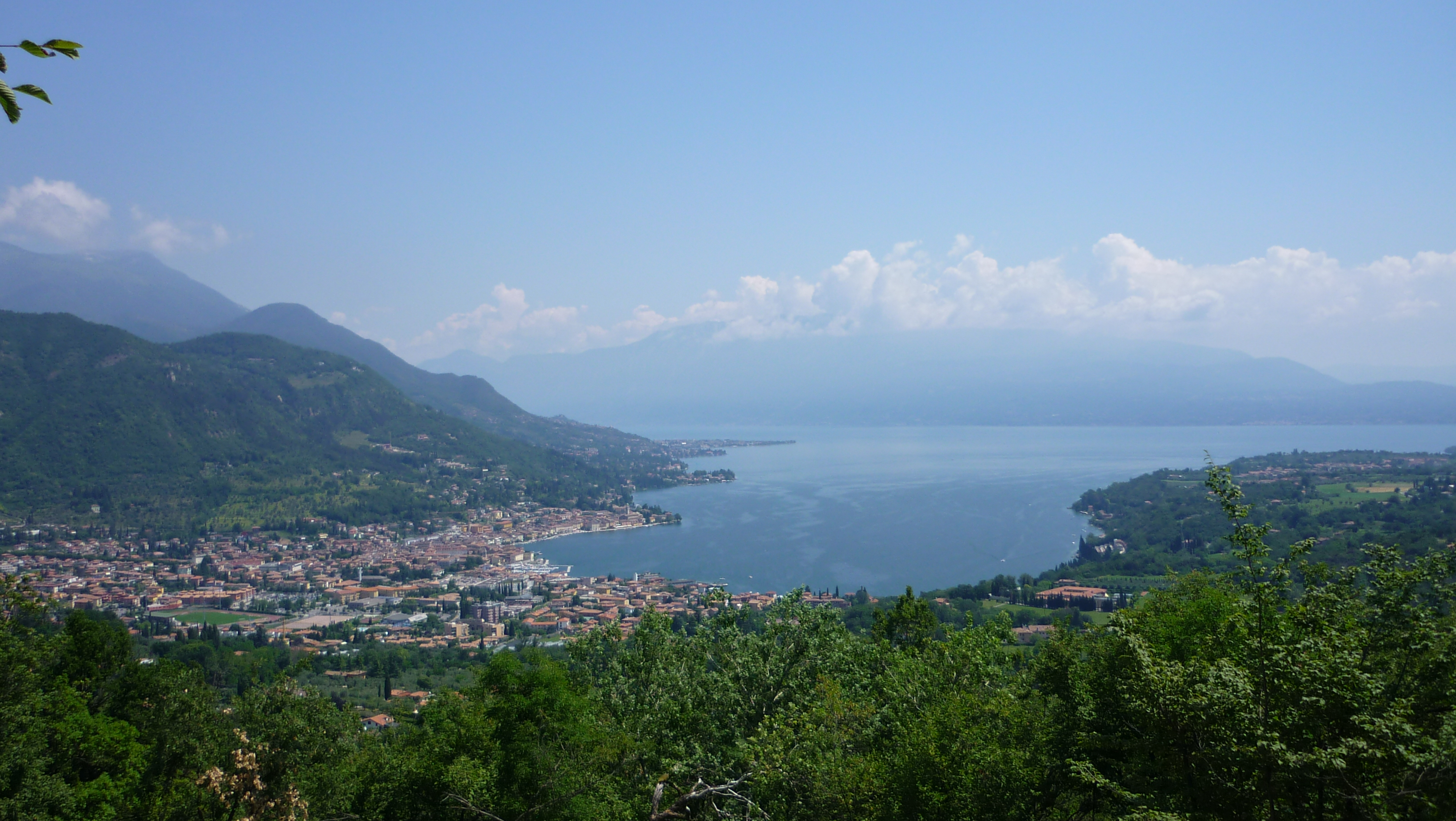
- View of Salò and its bay

- Coat of arms

- Location within Italy Location within Lombardy
- Coordinates: 45°36′30″N 10°31′00″E
- Country: Italy
- Region: Lombardy
- Province: Brescia (BS)
- Frazioni: Barbarano, Campoverde, Renzano, Villa, Cunettone, Serniga, San Bartolomeo, Moriondo

Government
  - Mayor: Francesco Cagnini

Area
  - Total: 29 km^{2} (11 sq mi)
- Elevation: 65 m (213 ft)

Population (2017)
  - Total: 10,576
  - Density: 360/km^{2} (940/sq mi)
- Demonym: Salodiani
- Time zone: UTC+1 (CET)
  - Summer (DST): UTC+2 (CEST)
- Postal code: 25087
- Dialing code: 0365
- Patron saint: St. Charles
- Saint day: 4 November
- Website: Official website

Salò (Italian: [saˈlɔ]; Latin: Salodium) is a town and comune in the Province of Brescia in the region of Lombardy (northern Italy) on the banks of Lake Garda, on which it has the longest promenade. The city was the seat of government of the Italian Social Republic from 1943 to 1945, a state often referred to as the "Salò Republic" (Repubblica di Salò in Italian).

== History ==
=== Roman period ===
Although legend has it that Salò has Etruscan origins, recorded history starts with the founding by ancient Romans of the colony of Pagus Salodium. There are numerous ruins of the Roman settlement, as shown by the Lugone necropolis (in via Sant'Jago) and the findings (vase-flasks and funeral steles) in the Civic Archaeological Museum located at the Loggia della Magnifica Patria.

=== Middle Ages ===
The origins of the municipality of Salò are barely known: its autonomy from Brescia can be dated towards the end of the 13th century or the beginning of the next one, and the most ancient statues conserved by the city authorities are dated 1397. During the high Middle Ages, the city shared the same history as that of Lombardy.

From 1334 until its dissolution in 1797, the town was part of a sort of federation of town councils of the territory along the western lakeshore of Lake Garda (from Limone down to Desenzano) and the Valsabbia areas, initially called Riperia Lacus Gardae Brixiensis with its capital in Maderno and later known as the Riviera di Salò. The number of the council involved in the federation varied over time from 32 to 46.

The federation did not want to form an alliance with Brescia nor with Verona deciding instead to request the help of Venice. Due to the distance of Venice, this strategy did not guarantee the independence of the area and, after a short protectorate under the rule of Venice (from 1336 to 1349), Salò became a stronghold of the Milanese Visconti family. In 1377 Beatrice della Scala, the wife of Bernabò Visconti, wanted Salò to be the capital of the area, reducing the influence of Maderno: the city was provided with solid walls and the castle was built.

=== The Magnifica Patria ===
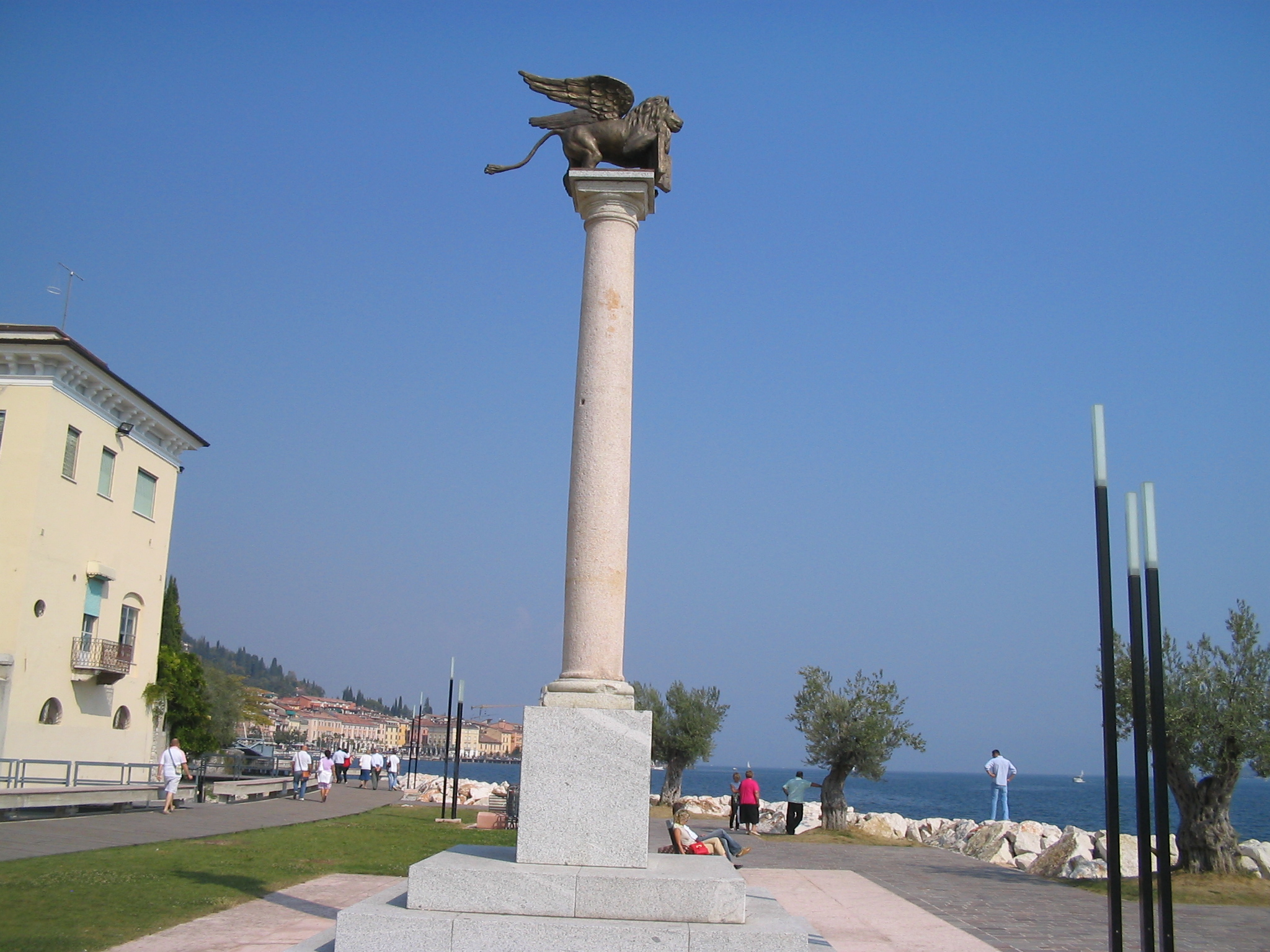
The Column with the winged lion of St. Mark, symbol of Venetian Republic

On 13 May 1426, after a long period of war, the towns of western bank of the lake spontaneously joined the Venetian Republic, where they remained for the following three centuries: in the main square a column with the Lion of St Mark, symbol of Venice, can be found still today.

Over the years, Venice gave great autonomy to this province of its Stato da Tera, that remained a de facto independent area and was given both the titles of Magnifica Patria (Magnificent Homeland) and Figlia primogenita della Serenissima (firstborn daughter of the Serenissima).

The general council of the Patria and its other institutions remained all centred in Salò (which gained importance and influence), although a governor was sent by the capital, who was given the titles of Provveditore (Superintendent) and Capitano della Riviera (Captain of the Riviera) and the power to act as penal judge for the whole Riviera (whilst civil justice was entrusted to a Brescian podestà who also resided in Salò). Besides farming and trade, the linen industry developed in this period.

During a pastoral visit to Salò in 1580 Carlo Borromeo settled various disputes and founded a spiritual Monte di Pietà to pay teachers to educate the poor children and youths of the town.

=== Napoleonic era and Risorgimento ===
In 1796 Napoleons troops fought with Austrian troops in Northern Italy during the First Italian campaign. The end of the Venetian republic (Treaty of Campo Formio) ended Salò's position as the capital of the western riviera: on 1 January 1797, the provisional Brescian government instituted the Canton of Benaco with the capital of Benaco, "aforesaid Salò": the town joined the Cisalpine Republic and then the Napoleonic Kingdom of Italy (1805–1814).

After the Napoleonic Era, Salò became part of the Austrian Kingdom of Lombardy–Venetia from 1815 to 1859.

In 1848 Salò joined the Milan revolution against the Habsburg rule and during the Second Italian War of Independence, there were many volunteers that fought with Garibaldi serving in the Piedmontese Army. On 18 June 1859, Garibaldi entered Salò and was welcomed by a happy crowd. Salò received the honorary title of Città (City) with a royal decree on 15 December 1860.

In 1866 the town was the headquarters of the Italian navy during the war with Austria. After the battle of Custoza the Austrians temporarily retook control of the town, but despite their victory and a naval defeat of the Italians at Lissa, the Austrians surrendered to the Prussians a month later and were forced to cede Venetia after the Treaty of Vienna.

=== Italian Social Republic ===
From 1943 to 1945 Salò was the de facto capital (seat of government) of Benito Mussolini's Nazi-backed puppet state, the Italian Social Republic, also known as the Republic of Salò: Villa Castagna was the seat of the police headquarters, Villa Amedei was the head office of the Ministry of Popular Culture, Villa Simonini (nowadays Hotel Laurin) was the seat of the Ministry of Foreign Affairs and the Stefani Agency, which distributed official press releases, was located in Via Brunati.

== Main sights ==
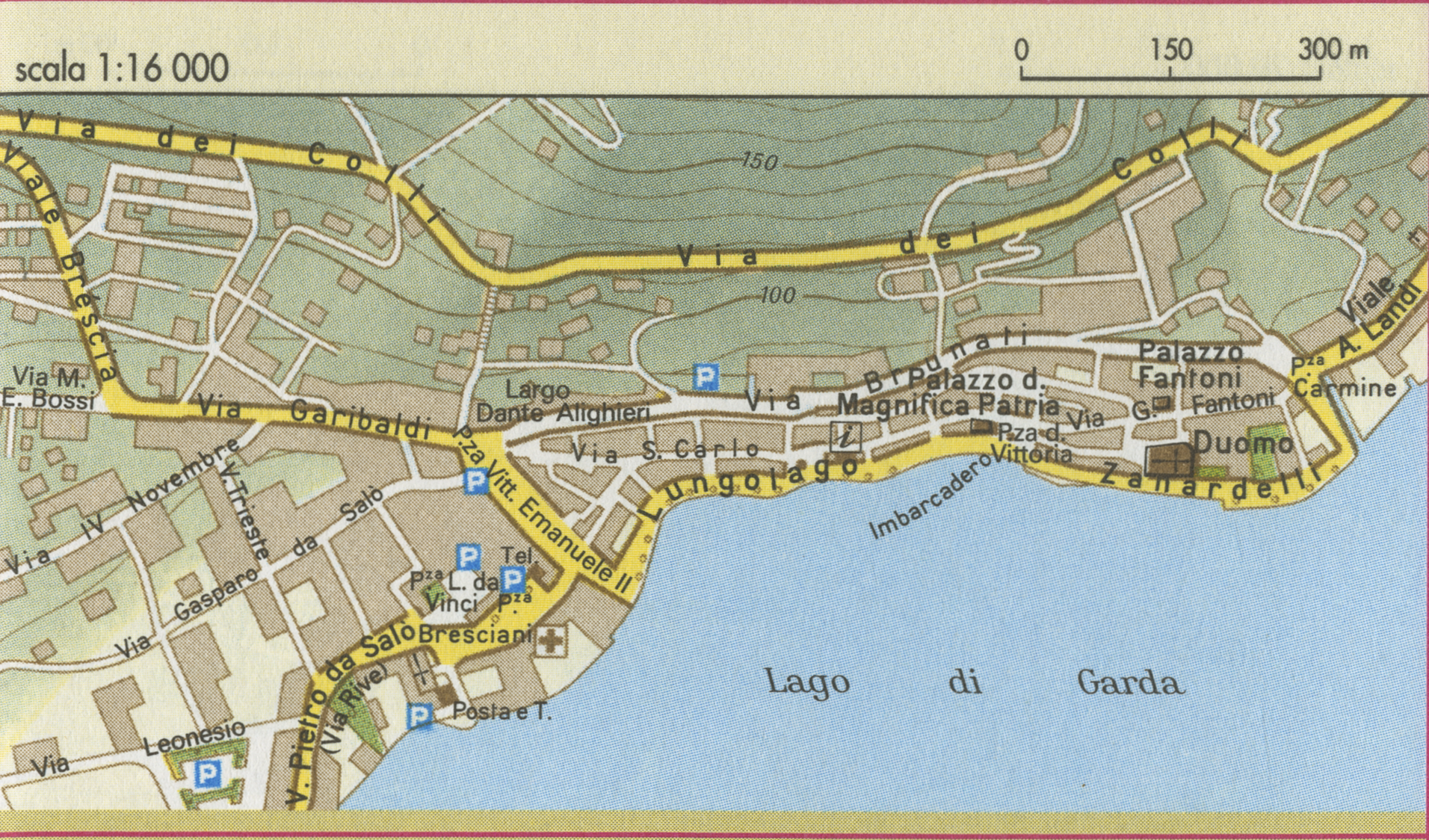
Map of city centre

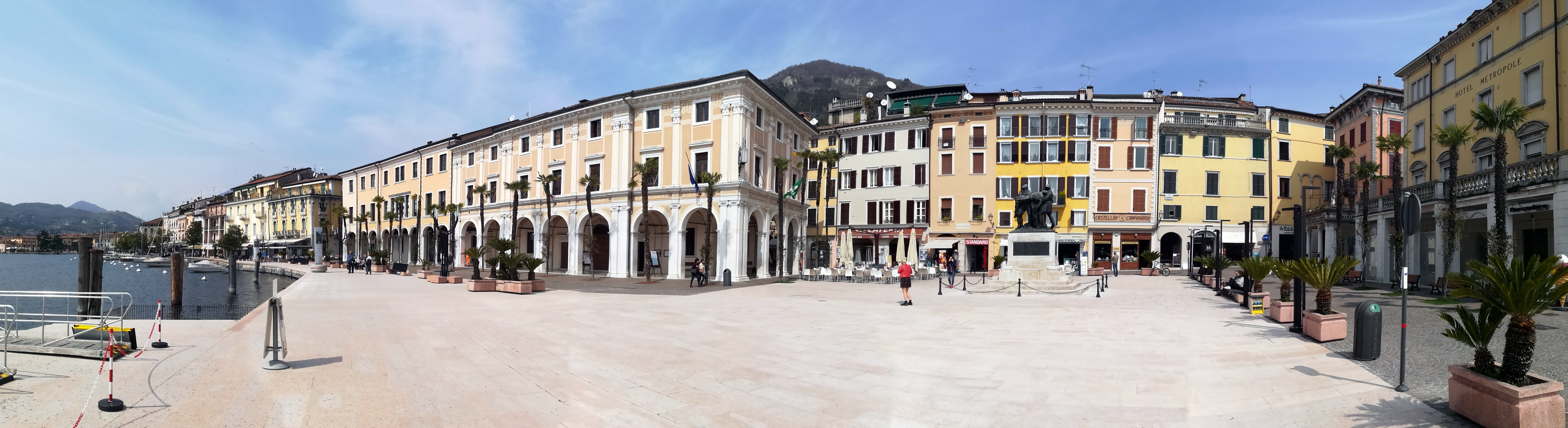
Salò main square

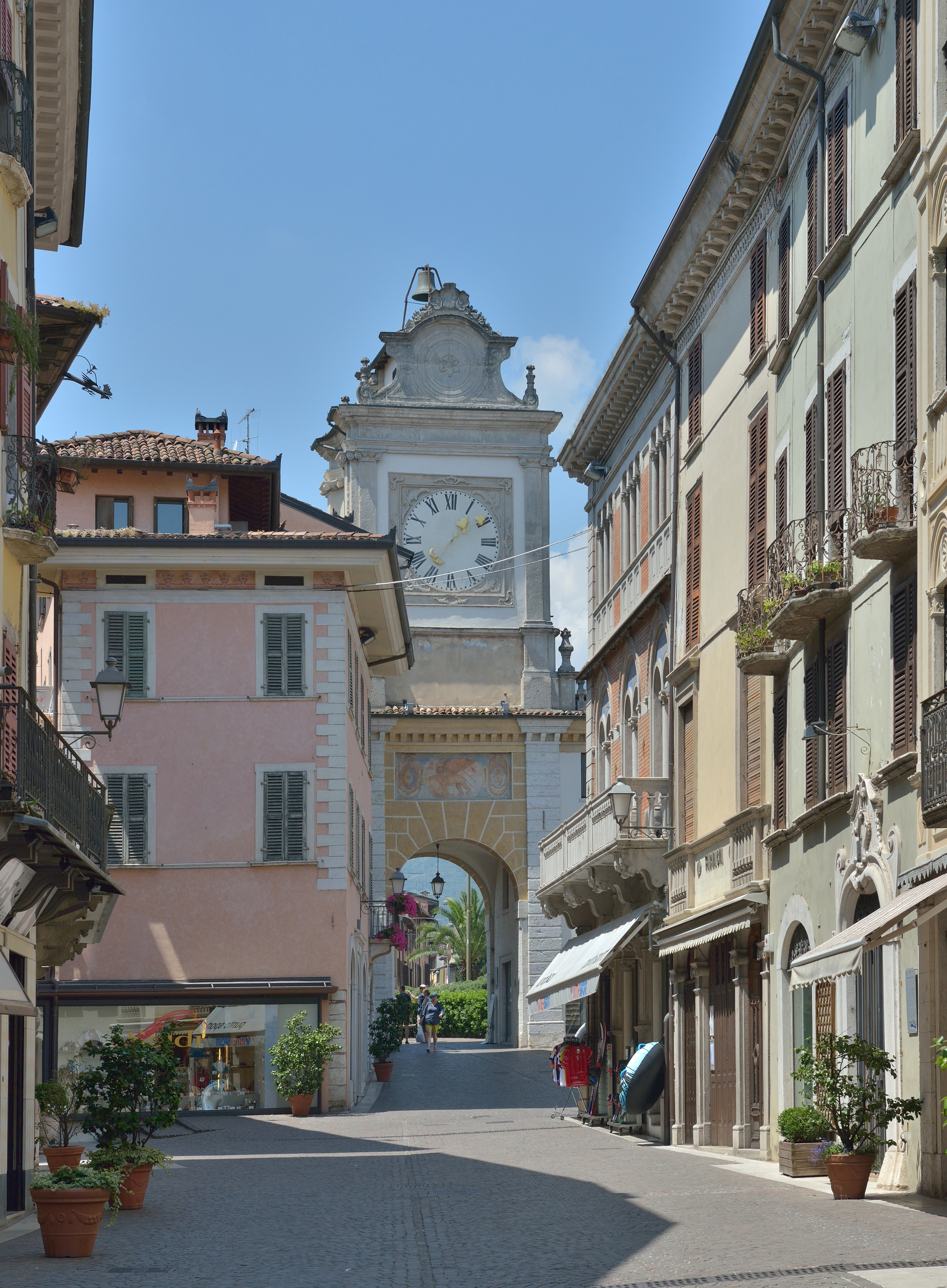
Porta dell'Orologio (Clock's Town Gate)

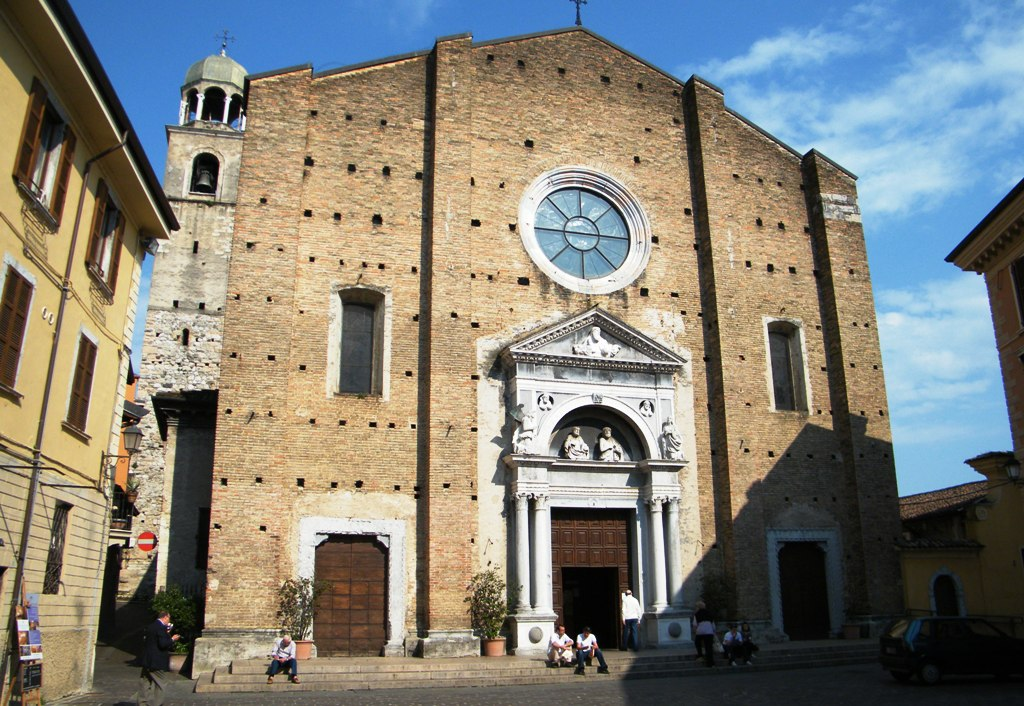
Façade of the Duomo

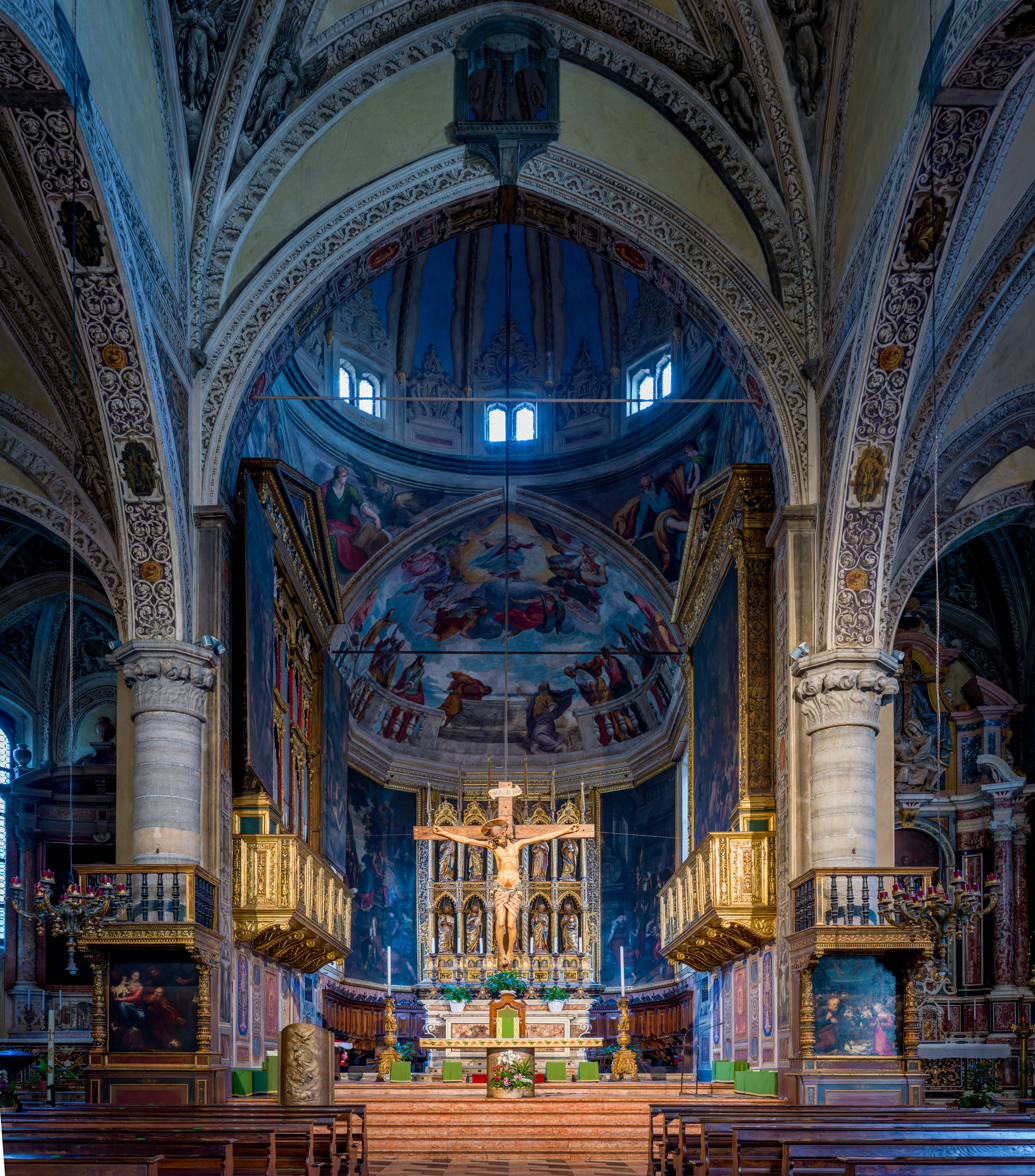
The interior of the Duomo

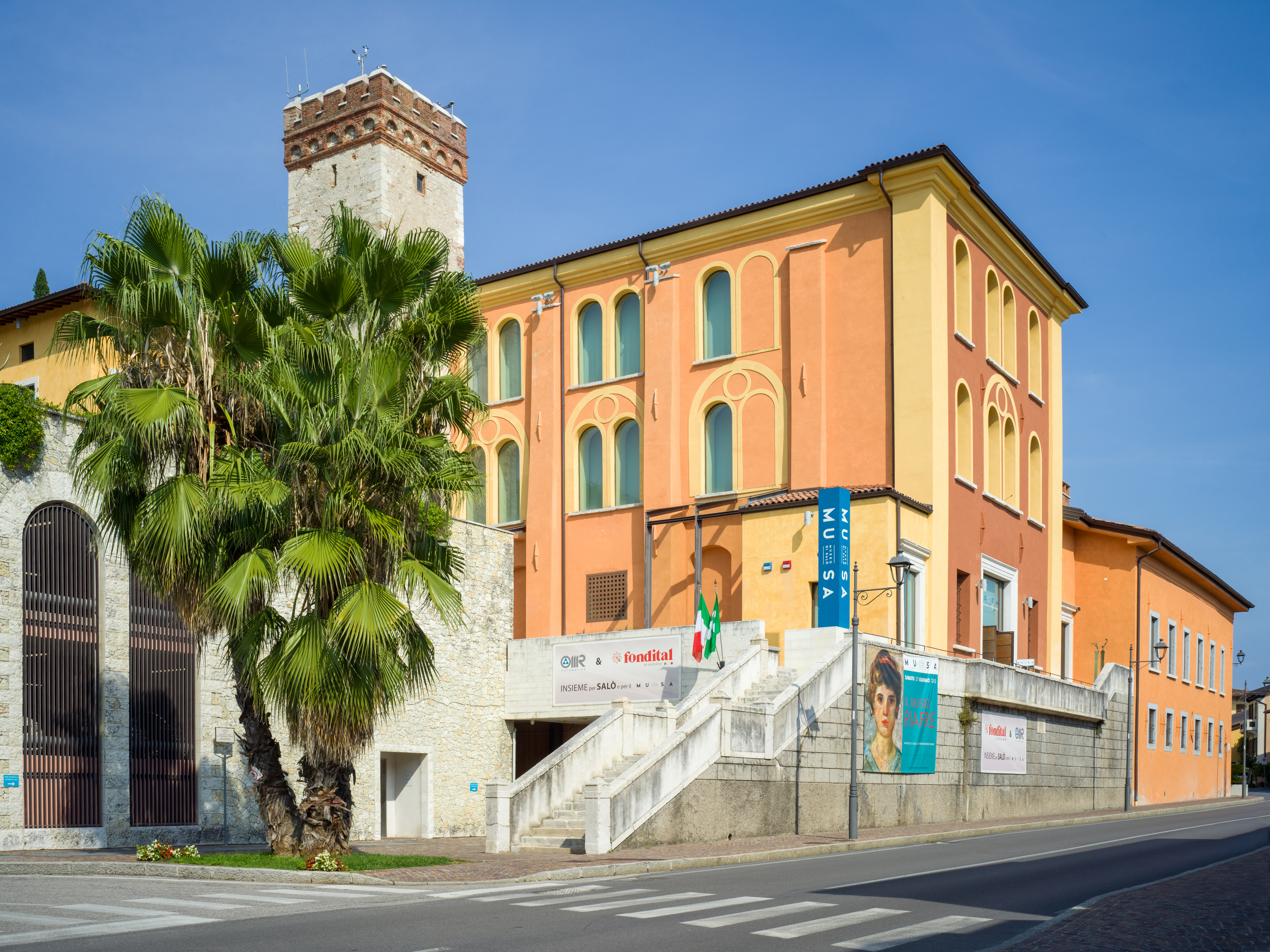
The local museum MUSA
- The Duomo di Santa Maria Annunziata (cathedral of the Annunciation to Saint Mary), rebuilt in late Gothic style in the 15th century. It has a noteworthy Renaissance portal by Gasparo Cairano and Antonio Mangiacavalli, paintings by Zenone Veronese (16th century), a Polyptych of Paolo Veneziano's school and a Madonna and Saints by Romanino.
- The Palazzo della Magnifica Patria ("Palace of the Magnificent Fatherland", 16th century). The palace is home to the Historical Museum of the Azure Ribbon, an exhibition of documents on Renaissance history, on Italy's colonial wars, the Spanish Civil War and the Resistance against Fascism.
- The Communal Palace is the seat of the Civic Archaeological Museum, with findings from the ancient Salodium.
- The local museum MUSA, opened in 2015.

== Seismicity ==
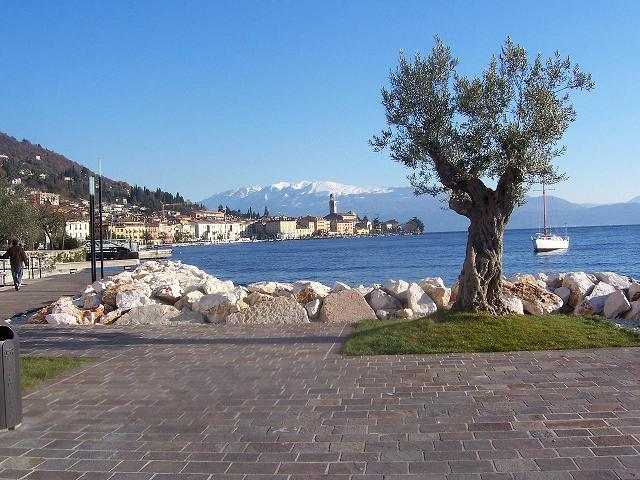
Salò and the Alps

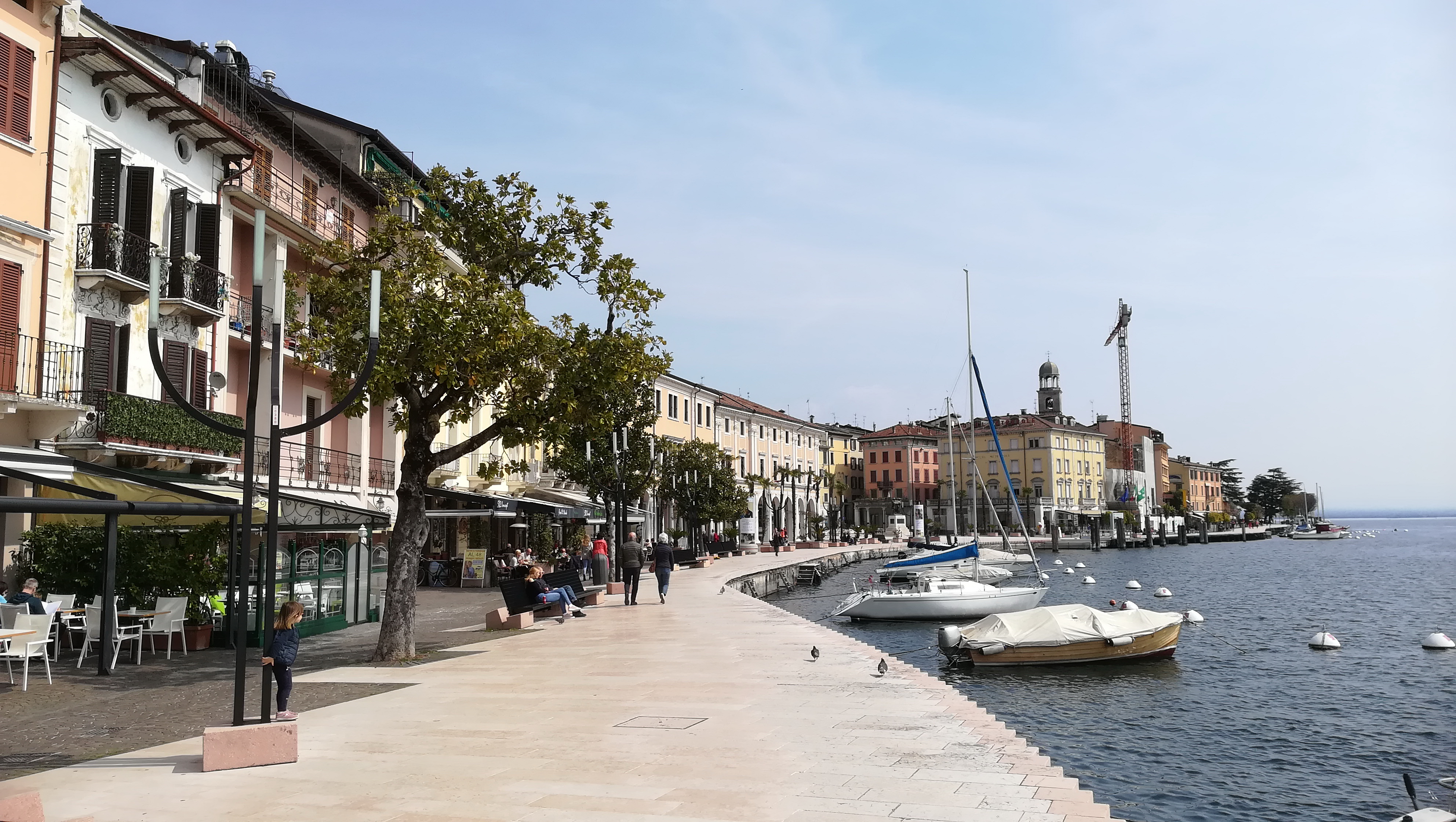
The city centre on the lakeshore

The area around the lake is a seismic zone. In 1877 a meteorological observatory was established under the supervision Prof. Pio Bettoni, to whom it was later dedicated. In 1889, a geophysical observatory (seismic station) was added, which became an important scientific research centre after the 1901 earthquake (5.5 M_{w}, intensity VII–VIII, no fatalities, buildings damaged). Another earthquake occurred in 2004 (5.1 M_{w}, intensity VII–VIII, nine injuries, many buildings damaged).

== Education ==
Schools include:

- Sezione Primavera "Paola di Rosa"
- Preschools:
  - Scuola dell’Infanzia Trivero
  - Scuola dell’Infanzia Montessori
  - Scuola dell’Infanzia Paola di Rosa
- Elementary schools:
  - Scuola Primaria T. Olivelli
  - Scuola Primaria S. Giuseppe
- Junior high schools:
  - Scuola Secondaria 1º Grado D'Annunzio
  - Scuola Secondaria 1º Grado E. Medi
- Liceo Scientifico E. Fermi – Senior high school

The comune has a library, the Biblioteca Civica di Salò.

== Sports ==
Until 2025, Salò was home to the football team Feralpisalò, which was formed in 2009 after the merger of A.C. Salò and A.C. Feralpi Lonato.

== Municipal government ==
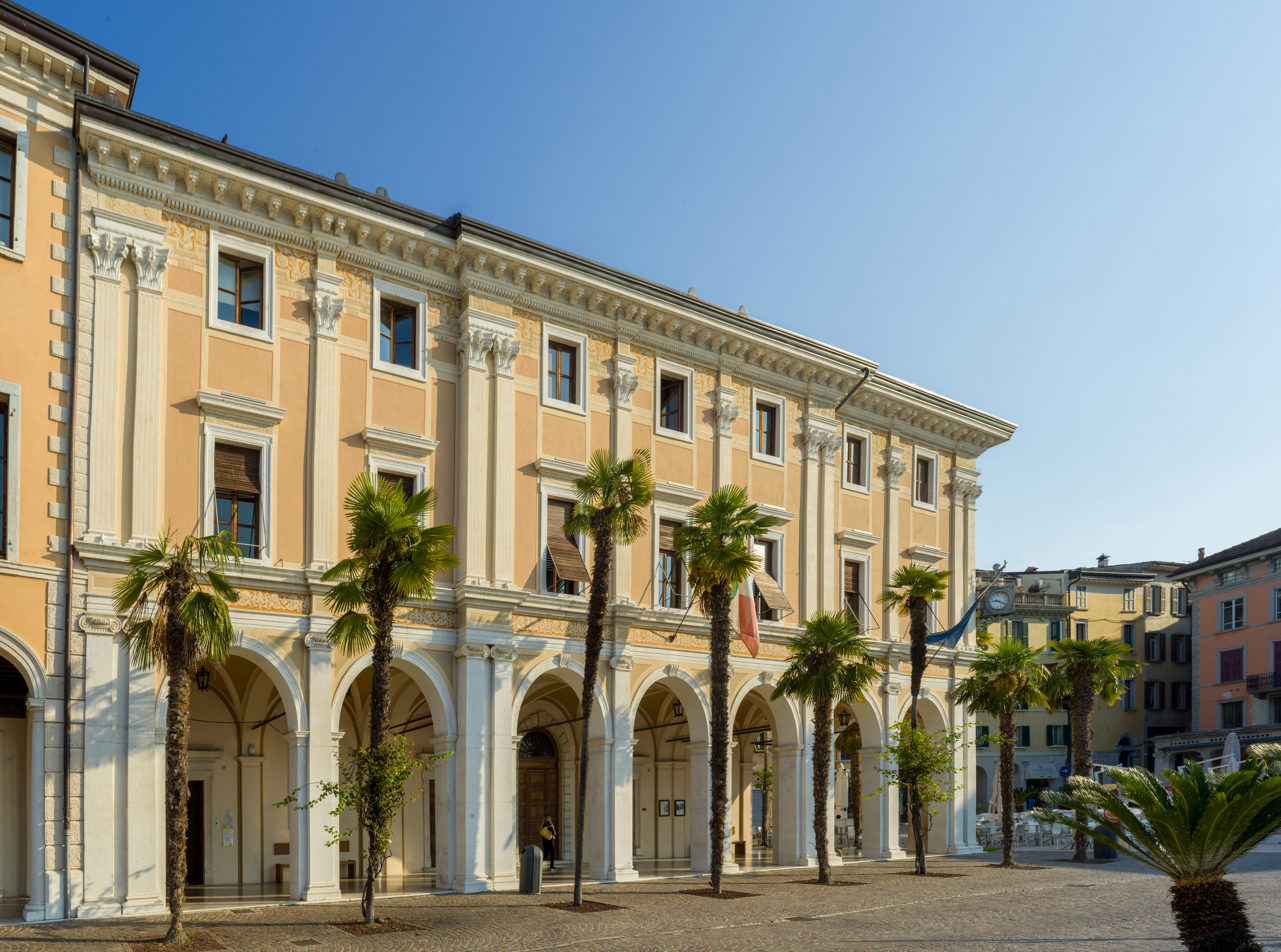
The Town Hall

Salò is headed by a mayor (sindaco) assisted by a legislative body, the consiglio comunale, and an executive body, the giunta comunale. Since 1995 the mayor and members of the consiglio comunale are directly elected together by resident citizens, while from 1945 to 1995 the mayor was chosen by the legislative body. The giunta comunale is chaired by the mayor, who appoints others members, called assessori. The offices of the comune are housed in a building usually called the municipio or palazzo comunale.

Since 1995 the mayor of Salò is directly elected by citizens, originally every four, then every five years. The current mayor is Francesco Cagnini, a center-left independent, elected on 10 June 2024 with the 40% of the votes.

Mayor	Term start	Term end	Party
Giovanni Cigognetti	24 April 1995	14 June 1999	PDS
Gianpietro Cipani	14 June 1999	8 June 2009	FI
Barbara Botti	8 June 2009	26 May 2014	FI
Gianpietro Cipani	26 May 2014	10 June 2024	FI
Francesco Cagnini	10 June 2024	Incumbent	Ind (Note: Center-left independent.)

== Notable residents ==
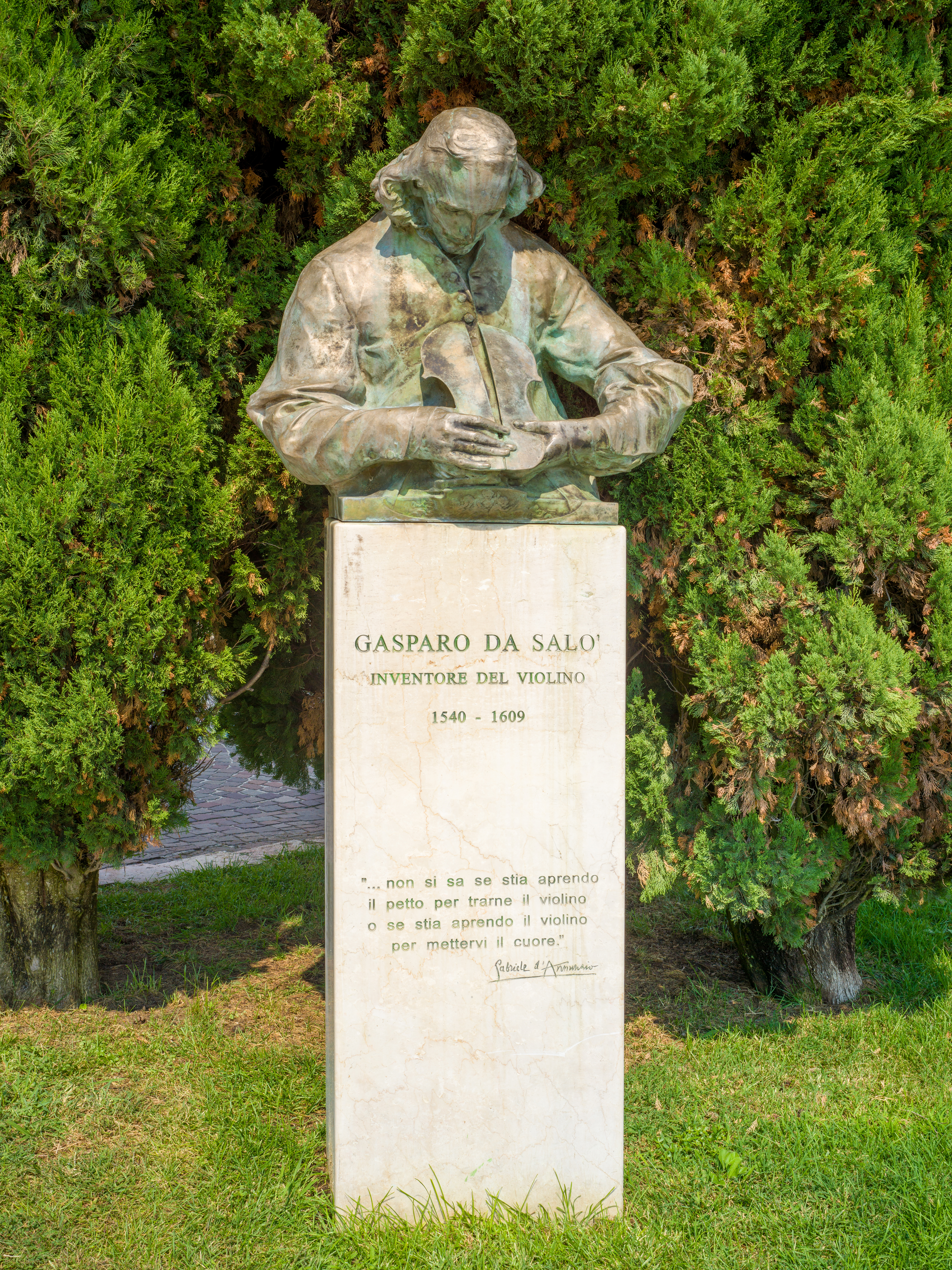
The bust of Gasparo da Salò

- Benito Mussolini, Italian fascist dictator
- Gasparo da Salò, one of the earliest violin makers
- Pietro Bellotto, late-Baroque painter born in Volciano
- Ferdinando Bertoni, Italian composer and organist
- Marco Enrico Bossi, Italian composer and organist
- Sante Cattaneo, 19th century Painter
- Luigi Comencini, Italian film director
- Angelo Zanelli, Italian sculptor
- Nino Bertasio, golfer
- Alessio Lorandi, racing driver
- Leonardo Lorandi, racing driver

== Gallery ==
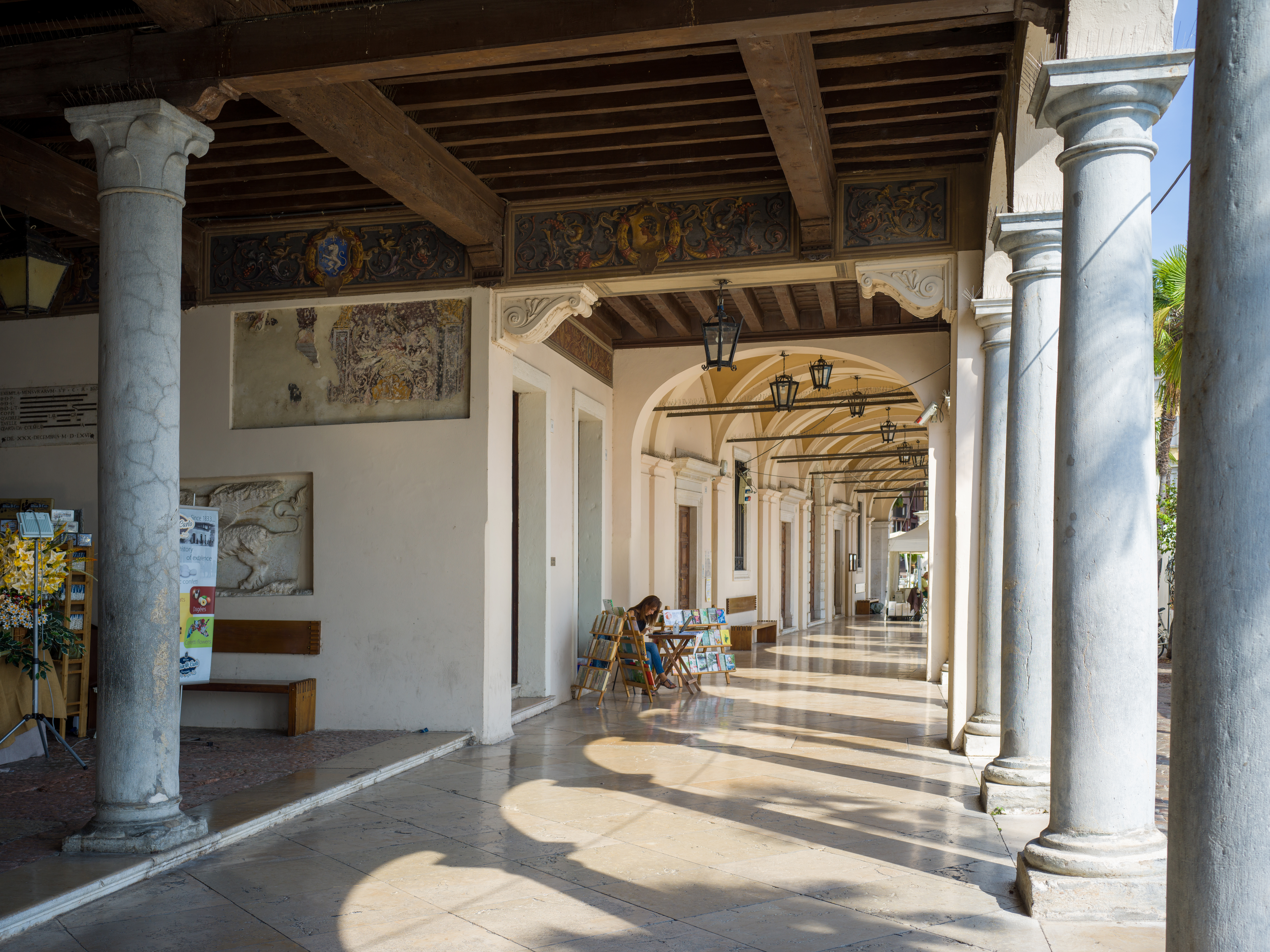
Arcades

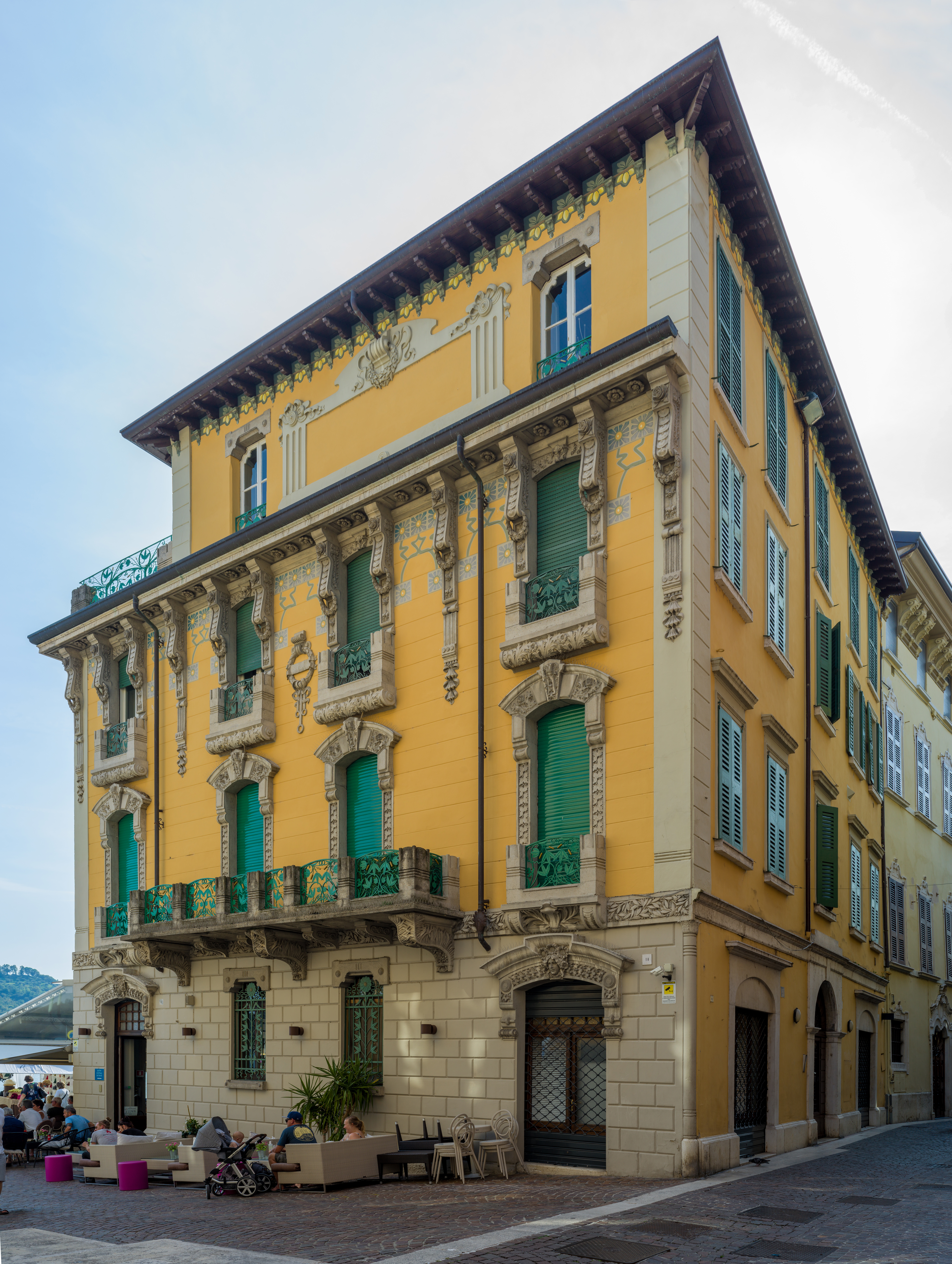
Liberty style architecture

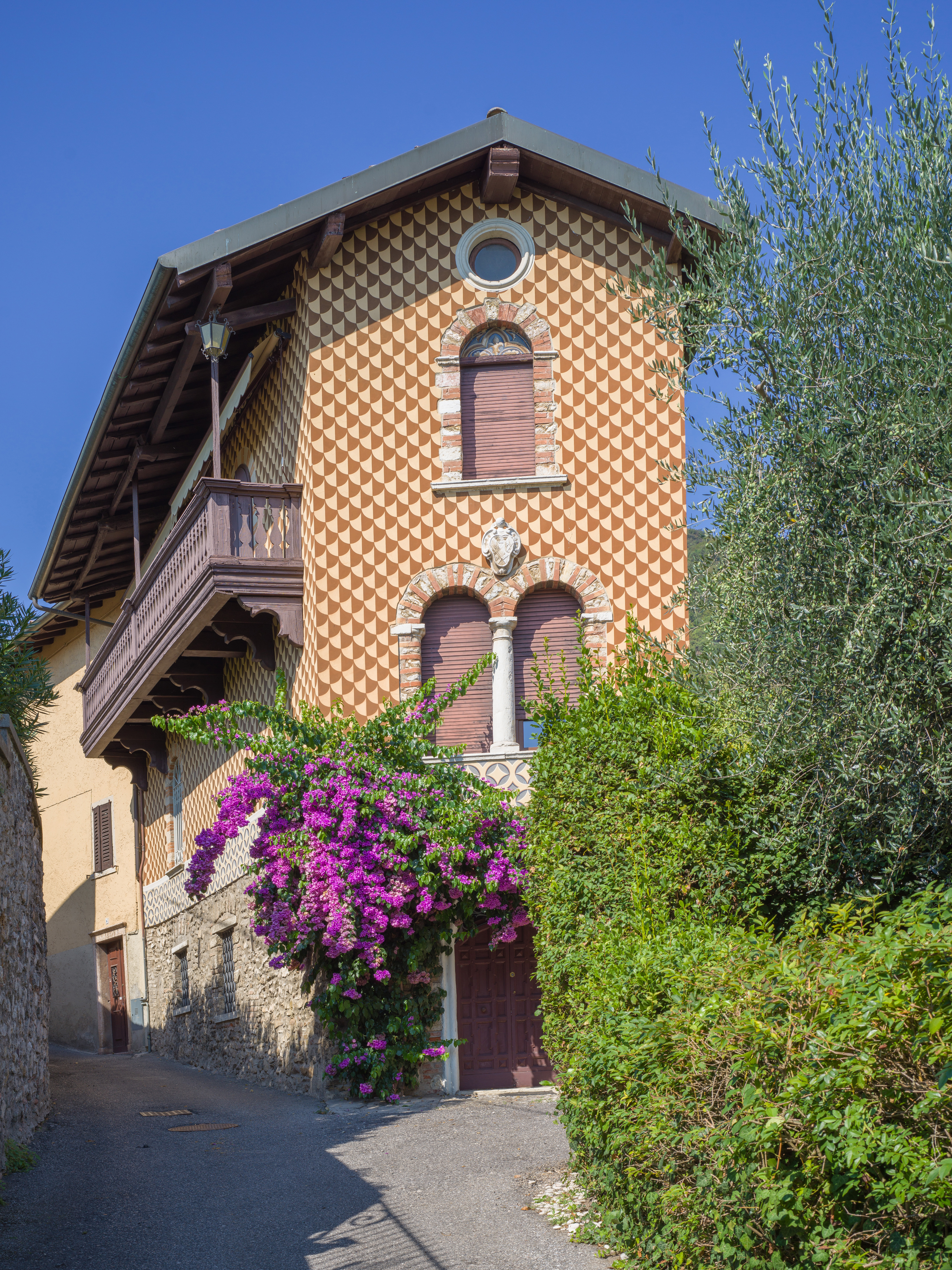
Private house

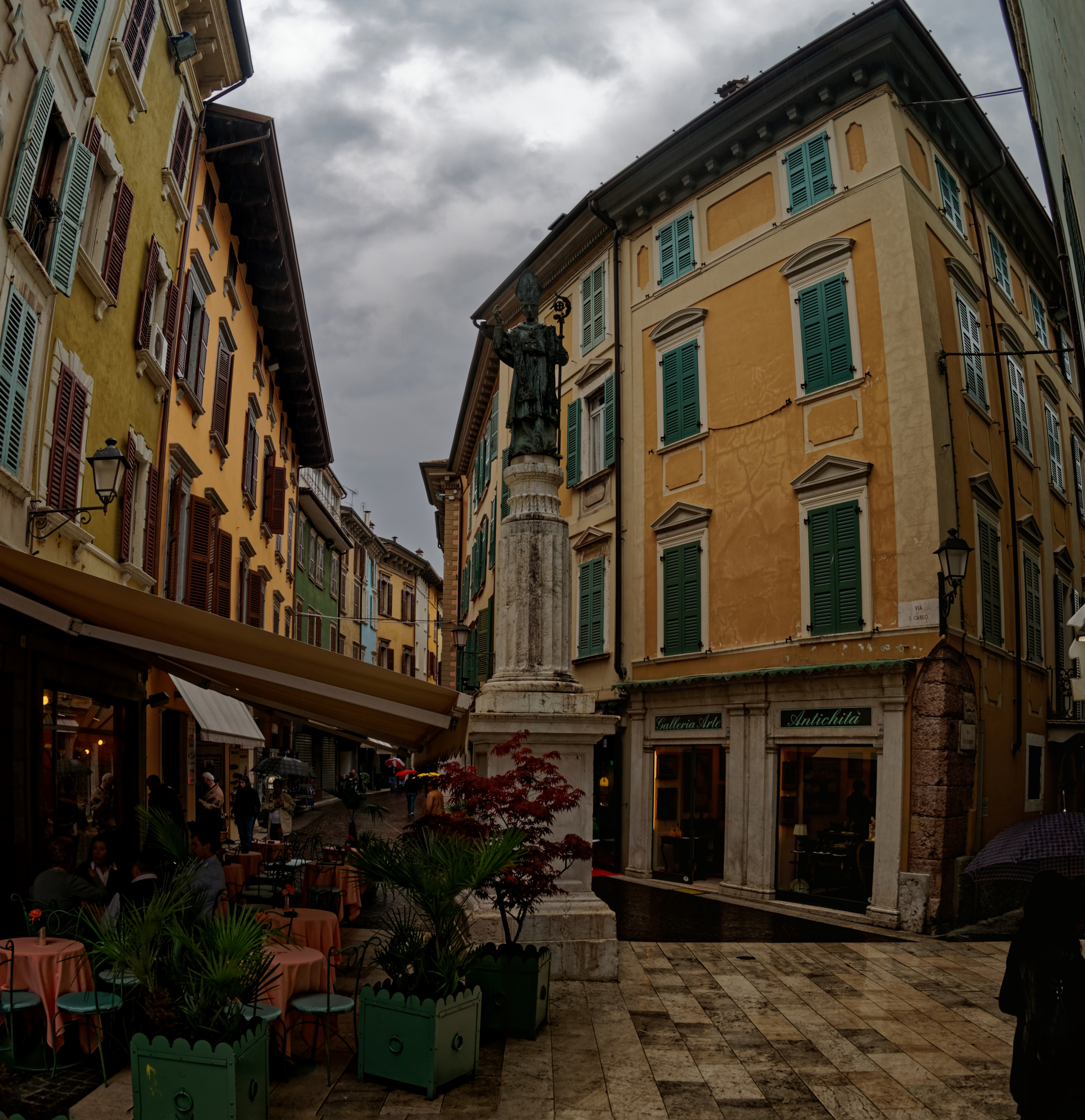
St. Charles statue

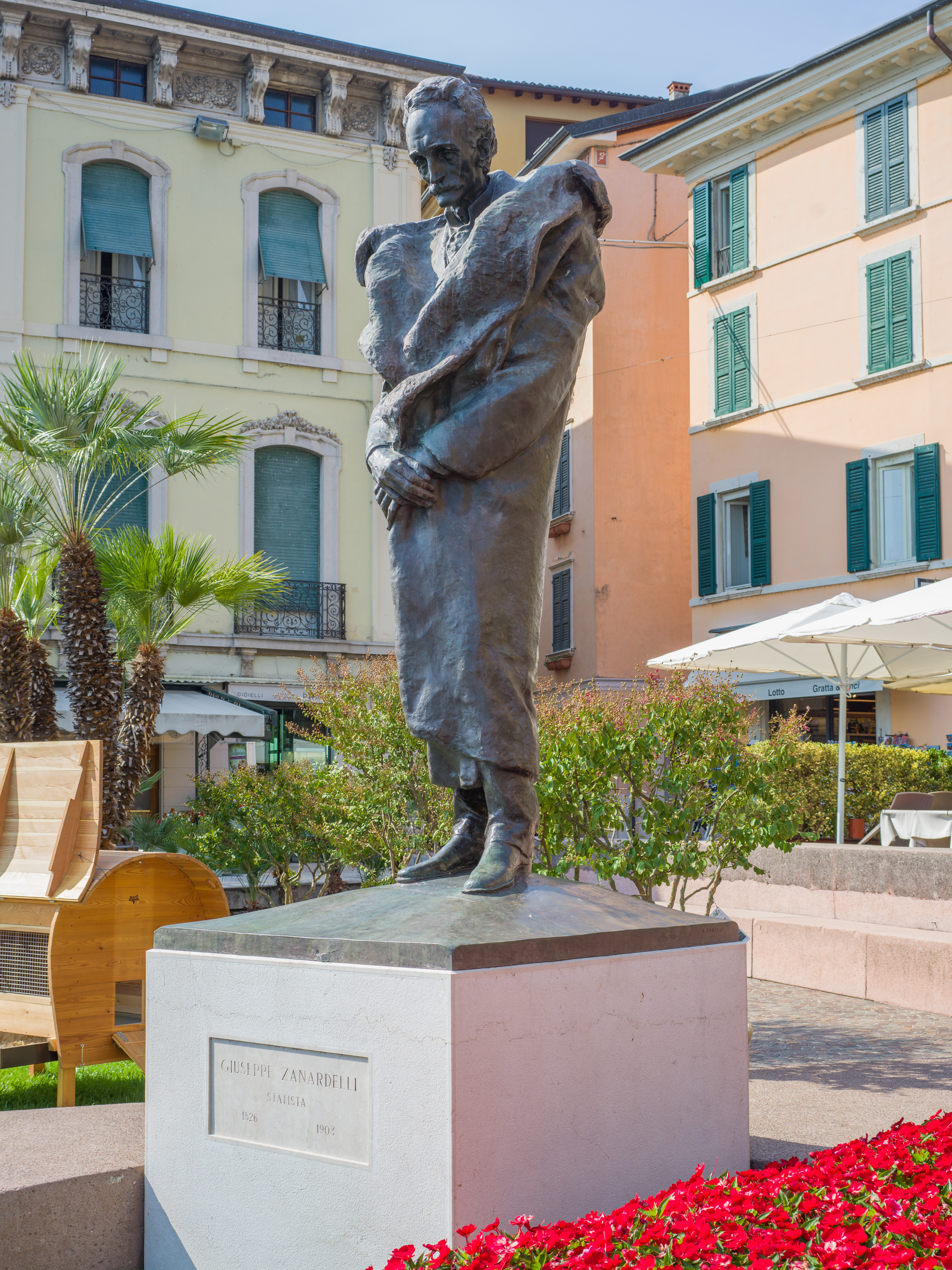
Monument to Giuseppe Zanardelli

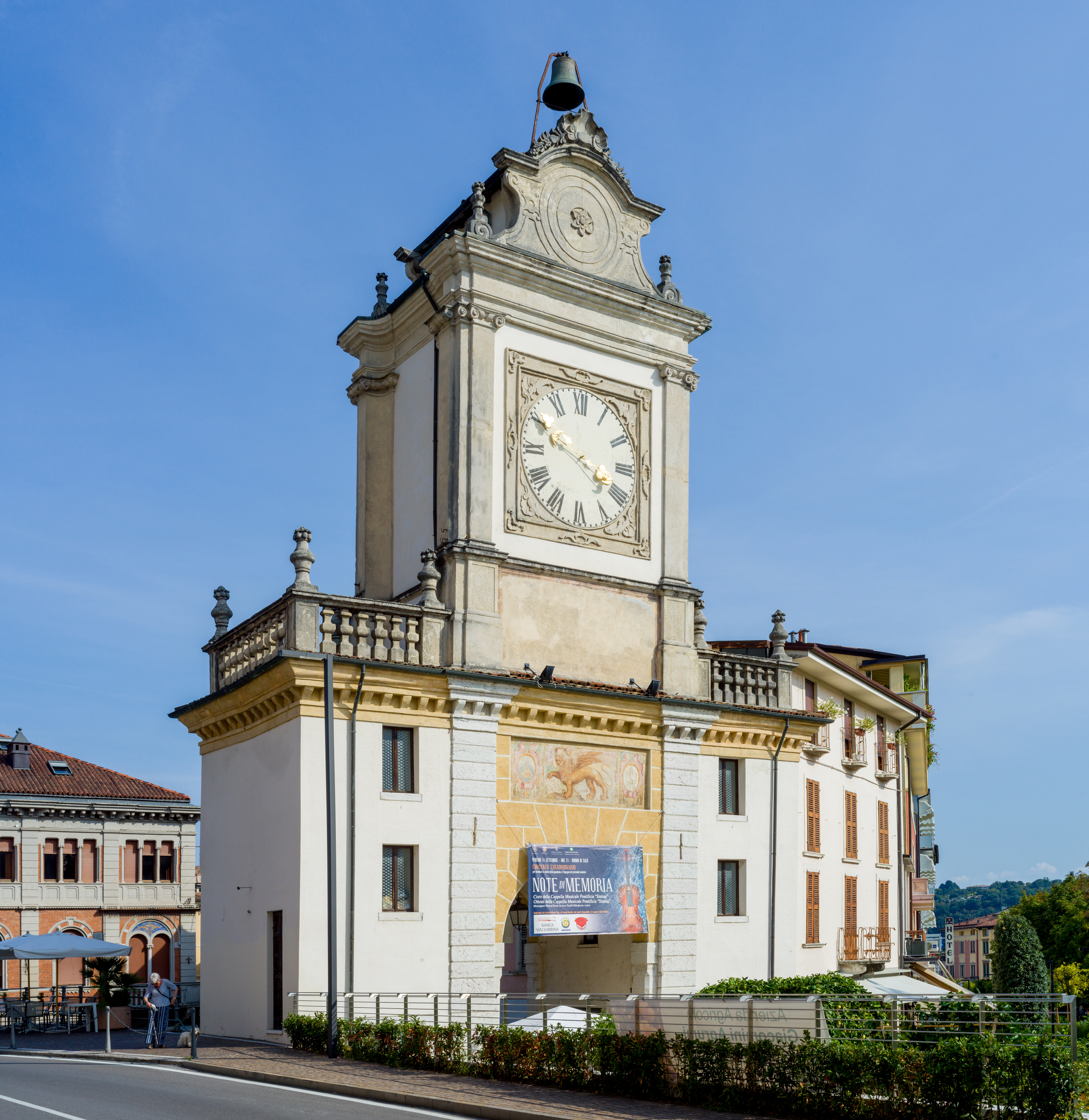
The clock tower

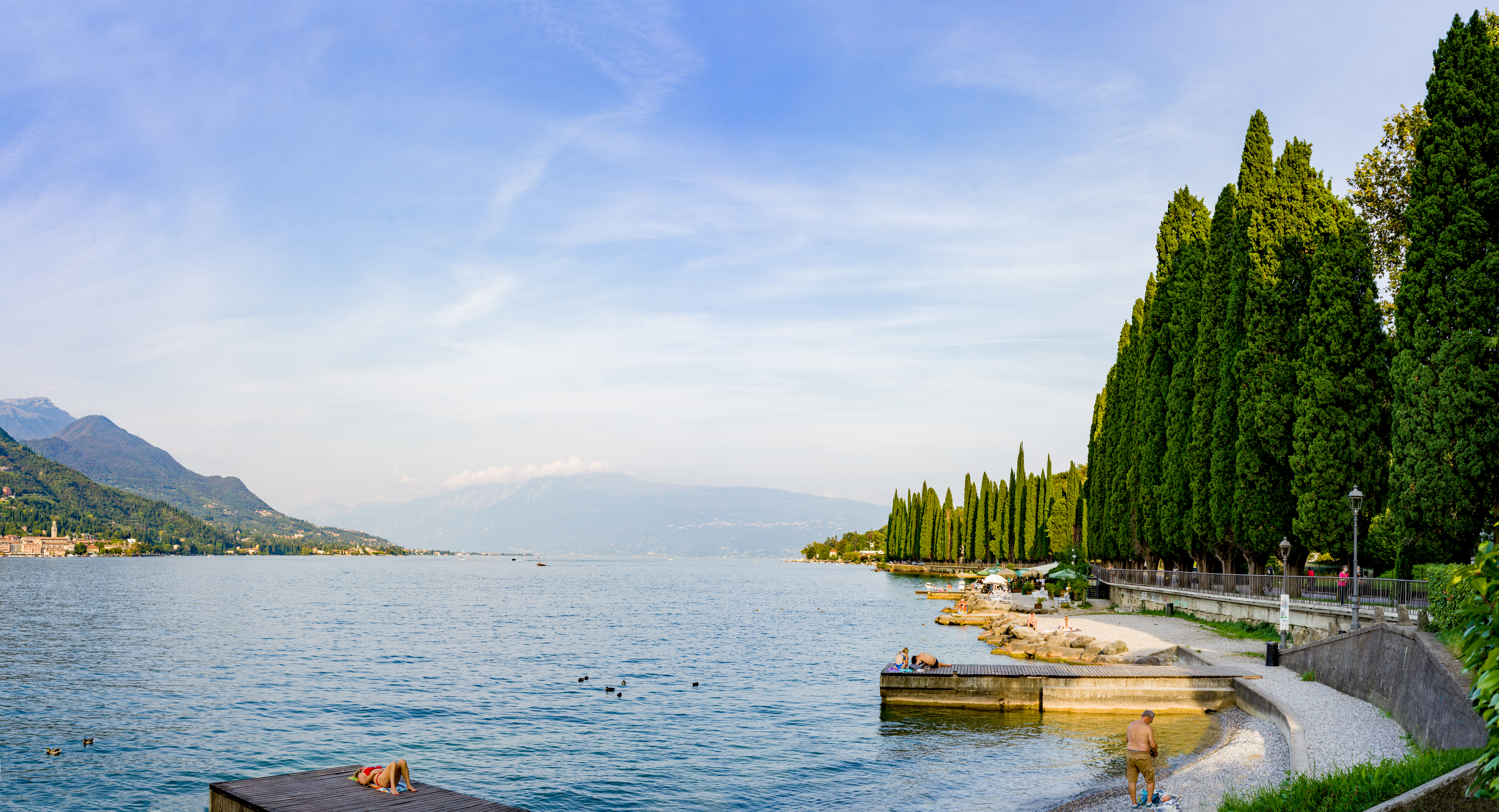
Main shore

== Climate ==
Climate data for Salò (1981–2010)
Month	Jan	Feb	Mar	Apr	May	Jun	Jul	Aug	Sep	Oct	Nov	Dec	Year
Mean daily maximum °C (°F)	7.3 (45.1)	8.8 (47.8)	13.4 (56.1)	17.4 (63.3)	22.8 (73.0)	26.7 (80.1)	29.4 (84.9)	28.7 (83.7)	23.8 (74.8)	17.8 (64.0)	11.9 (53.4)	8.1 (46.6)	18.0 (64.4)
Daily mean °C (°F)	4.5 (40.1)	5.5 (41.9)	9.5 (49.1)	13.2 (55.8)	18.2 (64.8)	21.9 (71.4)	24.5 (76.1)	24.0 (75.2)	19.7 (67.5)	14.7 (58.5)	9.0 (48.2)	5.4 (41.7)	14.2 (57.5)
Mean daily minimum °C (°F)	1.6 (34.9)	2.2 (36.0)	5.6 (42.1)	9.0 (48.2)	13.5 (56.3)	17.1 (62.8)	19.5 (67.1)	19.2 (66.6)	15.7 (60.3)	11.6 (52.9)	6.2 (43.2)	2.7 (36.9)	10.3 (50.6)
Average precipitation mm (inches)	77 (3.0)	67 (2.6)	86 (3.4)	86 (3.4)	106 (4.2)	95 (3.7)	90 (3.5)	115 (4.5)	89 (3.5)	120 (4.7)	106 (4.2)	68 (2.7)	1,105 (43.4)
Average precipitation days (≥ 1.0 mm)	7	6	8	9	11	10	7	8	6	8	9	6	95
Source 1: Istituto Superiore per la Protezione e la Ricerca Ambientale
Source 2: Enea-Casaccia (precipitation) Climi e viaggi (precipitation days)
