= 2007–08 Serie D =

Serie D
- Season: 2007–08

The 2007–08 Serie D was the sixty edition of the top level Italian non-professional football championship. It represented the fifth tier in the Italian football league system.

It was composed by 162 teams divided into nine divisions of 18 teams each.

The regular Serie D season started September 2, 2007 and continued through to May 4, 2008 with each team playing 34 matches, two matches against every other team in the division. The nine division winners were automatically promoted to 2008–09 Lega Pro Seconda Divisione, while the two last-placed teams were automatically relegated to Eccellenza.

After the regular season was completed, teams placed 13 through to 16 in each division played a double-leg series (13 vs 16, 14 vs 15) where the winners remained in Serie D the following season and the two losers were also relegated to Eccellenza for a total of 4 relegations in each division, 36 in total for the league.

The nine division winners entered a tournament to determine the over-all Serie D champion and was awarded the Scudetto Dilettanti.

Teams placed second through fifth in each division entered a play-off tournament after the regular season as well. The results of the play-offs provided a list, starting with the winner, by which vacancies could be filled in Lega Pro Seconda Divisione, if teams in the professional leagues above Serie D run into financial difficulties or are penalized.

== Events and results ==
=== Promotions ===
On March 30, 2008, Alessandria from Girone A and Isola Liri from Girone G were mathematically ensured of the Serie D title in their respective divisions five weeks before the end of the regular season, thus winning promotion to Serie C2. To note, Isola Liri ensured a place in professional football for their first time. They were followed on April 13 by Girone D winners Figline, on April 20 by Itala San Marco and Giacomense, on April 27 by fallen giants Como and Cosenza. On May 4 Sangiustese and Aversa Normanna won the last two remaining Serie C2 spots, winning their respective divisions just on the final matchday.

In addition to the nine division winners, the top five teams in the promotional play-offs also won promotion to Lega Pro Seconda Divisione to fill vacancies.

=== Relegations ===
Thirty-six teams were destined to be relegated to Eccellenza for the 2008–09 season. The two last-placed teams from each of the nine divisions were directly relegated - 18 in total. Of the 18 teams that lost in the relegation play-offs, nine were eventually selected to remain in Serie D for the 2008–09 season in order to fill the vacancies created when nine extra teams were called up from Serie D to Serie C2, now called Lega Pro Seconda Divisione.

The nine vacancies in Serie C2 were created by the bankruptcies and other financial problems of nine teams in total that played in Serie B, C1 & C2 in 2007–08. As teams moved up to fill the void, nine spaces were left to be filled in Serie C2. As mentioned, five teams that played in Serie D in 2007–08 received extra promotions, while four teams initially relegated from C2 were called back.

After the 162-team list was set for the 2008–09 season, the league decided to place four of the nine financially troubled teams of the upper leagues in Serie D as well, resulting in a 166-team Serie D league for next season.

== Final standings ==
=== Legend ===
Promoted to Serie C2	Playoff Promotions	Relegated after playout	Directly relegated	Remains in D

=== Girone A ===
Pos	Team	Pld	Pts
1	Alessandria	34	76
2	Biellese	34	59
3	Pro Belvedere Vercelli	34	56
4	Lavagnese	34	55
5	Savona	34	55
6	Lottogiaveno	34	53
7	Sestrese	34	52
8	Rivarolese	34	49
9	Rivoli	34	49
10	Cirié	34	45
11	Derthona	34	44
12	Sestri Levante	34	44
13	Casale	34	43
14	Novese	34	41
15	Imperia	34	31 (Note: 3 points deducted.)
16	Sanremese	34	30
17	Vado	34	24
18	Saluzzo	34	21

Updated to match(es) played on unknown. Source:
Notes:

Teams from Piedmont & Liguria

=== Group B ===
Pos	Team	Pld	Pts
1	Como (P)	34	74
2	Tritium	34	72
3	Turate	34	60
4	Solbiatese	34	59
5	Colognese	34	57
6	Darfo Boario	34	54
7	Salò	34	53
8	Voghera	34	53
9	Caratese	34	52
10	Renate	34	52
11	Borgomanero	34	45
12	Olginatese	34	41
13	Trento (Note: Re-admitted to Serie D for 2008–09 to fill vacancies.) (T)	34	35
14	US Sestese	34	35
15	Merate (Note: Re-admitted to Serie D for 2008–09 to fill vacancies.) (T)	34	29
16	Fanfulla	34	28
17	Base 96 Seveso (R)	34	26
18	Alta Vallagarina (R)	34	18

Updated to match(es) played on unknown. Source:
(P) Promoted; (R) Relegated; (T) Qualified, but not yet for the particular phase indicated
Notes:

Teams from Lombardy, Piedmont &
Trentino-Alto Adige/Südtirol

=== Girone C ===
Pos	Team	Pld	Pts
1	Itala San Marco	34	72
2	Chioggia S.	34	66
3	Sambonifacese	34	62
4	Sacilese	34	55
5	Jesolo	34	53
6	Domegliara	34	52
7	Belluno	34	45
8	Tamai	34	45
9	Union Quinto	34	44
10	Eurotezze	34	43
11	Montebelluna	34	43
12	Sanvitese	34	42
13	Sandonà (Note: Re-admitted to Serie D for 2008–09 to fill vacancies.)	34	42
14	Este (Note: Re-admitted to Serie D for 2008–09 to fill vacancies.)	34	42
15	Virtusvecomp	34	39
16	Montecchio M.	34	33
17	Rivignano	34	25
18	Sarone	34	24

Updated to match(es) played on unknown. Source:
Notes:

Teams from Veneto & Friuli-Venezia Giulia

=== Girone D ===
Teams from Lombardy, Emilia-Romagna,
Marche & Umbria

Pos	Team	Pld	Pts
1	Giacomense	34	70
2	Montichiari	34	60
3	Castellarano	34	58
4	Carpi	34	57
5	Real Montecchio	34	55
6	Santarcangelo	34	51
7	Mezzolara	34	45
8	Fano	34	44
9	Virtus Castelfranco	34	42
10	Crociati Noceto	34	41
11	Castel San Pietro	34	41
12	Feralpi Lonato	34	41
13	Castellana	34	40
14	Russi	34	40
15	Cagliese	34	38
16	Verucchio (Note: Re-admitted to Serie D for 2008–09 to fill vacancies.)	34	35
17	Cesenatico	34	26 (Note: 3 points deducted.)
18	Boca San Lazzaro	34	26

Updated to match(es) played on unknown. Source:

=== Girone E ===
Teams from Liguria, Tuscany & Umbria

Pos	Team	Pld	Pts
1	Figline	34	68
2	Colligiana	34	61
3	Pontedera	34	60
4	Armando Picchi	34	59
5	Forcoli	34	58
6	Orvietana	34	55
7	AS Sestese	34	48
8	Pontevecchio	34	44
9	Scandicci	34	43
10	Fortis Juventus	34	42
11	Sarzanese	34	41
12	Gavorrano	34	41
13	Sansepolcro	34	40
14	Cecina (Note: Re-admitted to Serie D for 2008–09 to fill vacancies.)	34	39
15	Montevarchi	34	34
16	Torgiano	34	32
17	Cascina	34	31
18	Fo.Ce. Lunezia	34	25

Updated to match(es) played on unknown. Source:

=== Girone F ===
Teams from Marche, Umbria, Abruzzo &
Molise

Pos	Team	Pld	Pts
1	Sangiustese	34	61
2	Renato Curi Angolana	34	60
3	Campobasso	34	57
4	Morro d'Oro	34	57
5	Grottammare	34	56
6	Recanatese	34	53
7	Centobuchi	34	45
8	Arrone	34	45
9	Venafro	34	44
10	Maceratese	34	44
11	Pro Vasto	34	44
12	Santegidiese	34	44
13	Luco Canistro	34	43
14	Olympia Agnonese	34	43
15	Narnese	34	42
16	Tolentino (Note: Re-admitted to Serie D for 2008–09 to fill vacancies.)	34	38
17	Bojano	34	29
18	Cologna Paese	34	25

Updated to match(es) played on unknown. Source:

=== Girone G ===
Teams from Lazio & Sardinia

Pos	Team	Pld	Pts
1	Isola Liri	34	74
2	Castelsardo	34	56
3	Tavolara	34	51
4	Alghero	34	50
5	Villacidrese	34	50
6	Ferentino	34	44
7	Cynthia	34	44
8	Monterotondo	34	43
9	Astrea	34	43
10	Bassano Romano	34	43
11	Rieti	34	43
12	Arzachena	34	42
13	Calangianus	34	41
14	Morolo	34	40
15	Lupa Frascati (Note: Re-admitted to Serie D for 2008–09 to fill vacancies.)	34	39
16	Guidonia M. (Note: Re-admitted to Serie D for 2008–09 to fill vacancies.)	34	38
17	Ostiamare	34	37
18	Albalonga	34	34

Updated to match(es) played on unknown. Source:

=== Girone H ===
Teams from Campania, Apulia & Basilicata

Pos	Team	Pld	Pts
1	Aversa Normanna	34	74
2	Barletta	34	73
3	Bitonto	34	57
4	Grottaglie	34	55
5	Pomigliano	34	55
6	Brindisi	34	51
7	Savoia	34	47
8	Francavilla	34	45
9	Ischia Isolaverde	34	45
10	Sapri	34	44
11	Fasano	34	44
12	Gragnano	34	44
13	Viribus Unitis	34	42
14	Quarto	34	39
15	Matera	34	35
16	Horatiana Venosa	34	34
17	Giugliano	34	32 (Note: 1 point deducted.)
18	Lavello	34	3 (Note: 2 points deducted.)

Updated to match(es) played on unknown. Source:

=== Girone I ===
Teams from Campania, Calabria & Sicily

Pos	Team	Pld	Pts
1	Fortitudo Cosenza	34	80
2	Bacoli Sibilla	34	71
3	Nocerina	34	60
4	Siracusa	34	55 (Note: 6 points deducted.)
5	Angri	34	50
6	Adrano	34	50
7	Gelbison Cilento	34	46
8	Libertas Acate	34	44
9	Turris	34	44
10	Rosarno	34	43
11	Vittoria	34	42
12	Acicatena	34	42
13	Sant'Antonio Abate	34	40
14	Caserta	34	39
15	Castrovillari	34	35
16	Paternò	34	33
17	Ippogrifo Sarno	34	31
18	Campobello	34	21

Updated to match(es) played on unknown. Source:

== Division winners ==
All teams promoted to 2008–09 Serie C2, now called Lega Pro Seconda Divisione

Division	Winners
A	Alessandria
B	Como
C	Itala San Marco
D	Giacomense
E	Figline
F	Sangiustese
G	Isola Liri
H	Aversa Normanna
I	Cosenza

== Scudetto Dilettanti ==
=== First round ===
- Division winners placed into 3 groups of 3
- Group winners and best second-placed team qualify for semi-finals

==== Group A ====
Pos	Team	Pld	W	D	L	GF	GA	GD	Pts
1	Itala San Marco (C)	2	1	1	0	4	3	+1	4
2	Como (B)	2	1	0	1	5	3	+2	3
3	Alessandria (A)	2	0	1	1	1	4	−3	1

Source: rsssf.com

Como (B)	2–3	Itala San Marco (C)	played May 11, 2008
Alessandria (A)	0–3	Como (B)	played May 14, 2008
Itala San Marco (C)	1–1	Alessandria (A)	played May 18, 2008

==== Group B ====
Pos	Team	Pld	W	D	L	GF	GA	GD	Pts
1	Sangiustese (F)	2	1	1	0	2	1	+1	4
2	Figline (E)	2	0	2	0	2	2	0	2
3	Giacomense (D)	2	0	1	1	3	4	−1	1

Source: rsssf.com

Giacomense (D)	1–2	Sangiustese (F)	played May 11, 2008
Figline (E)	2–2	Giacomense (D)	played May 14, 2008
Sangiustese (F)	0–0	Figline (E)	played May 18, 2008

==== Group C ====
Pos	Team	Pld	W	D	L	GF	GA	GD	Pts
1	Fortitudo Cosenza (I)	2	1	1	0	7	3	+4	4
2	Aversa Normanna (H)	2	1	0	1	6	4	+2	3
3	Isola Liri (G)	2	0	1	1	1	4	−3	1

Source: rsssf.com

Aversa Normanna (H)	3–0	Isola Liri (G)	played May 11, 2008
Isola Liri (G)	1–1	Fortitudo Cosenza (I)	played May 14, 2008
Fortitudo Cosenza (I)	4–3	Aversa Normanna (H)	played May 18, 2008

=== Semi-finals ===
First legs played May 25, 2008; return legs played June 1, 2008

Team 1	Agg.	Team 2	1st leg	2nd leg
Sangiustese (F)	2–3	Aversa Normanna (H)	2–0	0–3
Itala San Marco (C)	1–4	Fortitudo Cosenza (I)	1–2	0–2

=== Final ===
Played June 9, 2008 in Tolentino, Marche

Team 1	Score	Team 2
Aversa Normanna (H)	3–1	Fortitudo Cosenza (I)

Winners: Aversa Normanna (H)

== Promotion playoffs ==
=== Rules ===
- Promotion playoffs involved a total of 36 teams; four from each of the nine Serie D divisions (teams placed from 2nd through to 5th with one exception).
- New for 2007–08, the Coppa Italia Serie D winner was directly admitted to the semi-final round. The 2007–08 cup winner was Como. Since they won direct promotion by winning Division B, the semi-final place was given to the losing finalist, Colligiana.
- Since Colligiana finished 2nd in division E, teams finishing 3rd through 6th were admitted to the playoffs in that division.
- The first two rounds were one-legged matches played in the home field of the best-placed team.
- Games ending in ties were extended to extra time. New for the 2007–08 season, the higher classified team was declared the winner if the game was still tied after extra time. Penalty kicks were not taken.
- Round one matched 2nd & 5th-placed teams, and 3rd & 4th-placed teams within each division, except for division E.
- The two winners from each division played each other in the second round.
- The nine winners - one each from the nine Serie D divisions - were then split into three groups of three teams each. Every team played two matches, one against each of the other two opponents within the group. The three group winners qualified for the semifinal round, joining Colligiana.
- The semi-finals were two-legged matches, and the respective winners moved on to play in a one-legged final hosted in a neutral ground.
- The tournament results provided a list, starting with the winner, by which vacancies could be filled in Serie C2, now called Lega Pro Seconda Divisione.
- Ultimately, the top 5 tournament teams all won promotion to Lega Pro Seconda Divisione.

=== First round ===
- Played on May 11 & 12, 2008; single-legged matches played at best placed club home field
- 2nd-placed team plays 5th-placed team, and 3rd plays 4th in each division
- Games ending in a tie are extended to extra time, if still tied, the higher-classified team wins

Team 1	Score	Team 2
Biellese (A2)	2–0	(A5) Savona
P.B. Vercelli (A3)	1–0	(A4) Lavagnese
Tritium (B2)	0–0 (a.e.t.)	(B5) Colognese
Turate (B3)	5–1	(B4) Solbiatese
Chioggia S. (C2)	2–0	(C5) Jesolo
Sambonifacese (C3)	2–2 (a.e.t.)	(C4) Sacile
Montichiari (D2)	4–2	(D5) Real Montecchio
Castellarano (D3)	1–0	(D4) Carpi
Pontedera E3)	2–3	(E6) Orvietana
Armando Picchi (E4)	5–0	(E5) Forcoli
Renato Curi (F2)	3–1	(F5) Grottammare
Campobasso F3)	2–1	(F4) Morro d'Oro
Castelsardo (G2)	1–1 (a.e.t.)	(G5) Villacidrese
Tavolara (G3)	1–2 (a.e.t.)	(G4) Alghero
Barletta (H2)	2–1 (a.e.t.)	(H5) Grottaglie
Bitonto (H3)	1–1 (a.e.t.)	(H4) Pomigliano
Bacoli Sibilla (I2)	1–0	(I5) Adrano
Nocerina (I3)	0–1	(I4) Siracusa

=== Second round ===
- Played May 18,19 & 21, 2008; single-legged matches played at best placed club home field
- One team from each division moves on to third round

Team 1	Score	Team 2
Biellese (A2)	1–2 (a.e.t.)	(A3) P.B. Vercelli
Tritium (B2)	2–2 (a.e.t.)	(B3) Turate
Chioggia S. (C2)	0–1	(C3) Sambonifacese
Montichiari (D2)	3–1	(D3) Castellarano
Armando Picchi (E4)	1–1 (a.e.t.)	(E6) Orvietana
Renato Curi (F2)	2–0	(F3) Campobasso)
Castelsardo (G2)	0–3	(G4) Alghero
Barletta (H2)	1–0	(H3) Bitonto
Bacoli Sibilla (I2)	4–2 (a.e.t.)	(I4) Siracusa

=== Third round ===
- group winners qualify for semi-finals

==== Group A ====
Pos	Team	Pld	W	D	L	GF	GA	GD	Pts
1	Sambonifacese (C3)	2	2	0	0	4	1	+3	6
2	P.B. Vercelli (A3)	2	0	1	1	0	2	−2	1
3	Armando Picchi (E4)	2	0	1	1	1	2	−1	1

Source: rsssf.com

Armando Picchi (E4)	1–2	Sambonifacese (C3)	played May 25, 2008
P.B. Vercelli (A3)	0–0	Armando Picchi (E4	played May 28, 2008
Sambonifacese (C3)	2–0	P.B. Vercelli (A3)	played June 1, 2008

==== Group B ====
Pos	Team	Pld	W	D	L	GF	GA	GD	Pts
1	Montichiari (D2)	2	1	1	0	5	3	+2	4
2	Tritium (B2)	2	0	2	0	4	4	0	2
3	Bacoli Sibilla (I2)	2	0	1	1	3	5	−2	1

Source: rsssf.com

Montichiari (D2)	3–1	Bacoli Sibilla (I2)	played May 25, 2008
Bacoli Sibilla (I2)	2–2	Tritium (B2)	played May 28, 2008
Tritium (B2)	2–2	Montichiari (D2)	played June 1, 2008

==== Group C ====
Pos	Team	Pld	W	D	L	GF	GA	GD	Pts
1	Alghero (G4)	2	1	1	0	2	1	+1	4
2	Barletta (H2)	2	1	1	0	1	0	+1	4
3	Renato Curi (F2)	2	0	0	2	1	3	−2	0

Source: rsssf.com

Barletta (H2)	0–0	Alghero (G4)	played May 25, 2008
Renato Curi Angolana (F2)	0–1	Barletta (H2)	played May 28, 2008
Alghero (G4)	2–1	Renato Curi (F2)	played June 1, 2008

=== Semi-finals ===
First legs played June 8, 2008; return legs played June 14 & 15, 2008

Team 1	Agg.	Team 2	1st leg	2nd leg
Alghero (G4)	0–2	Colligiana (Cup Runner-up)	0–0	0–2
Montichiari (D2)	2–5	Sambonifacese (C3)	2–2	0–3

=== Final ===
Played June 22, 2008 in Carpi, P. of Modena

Team 1	Score	Team 2
Colligiana (Cup Runner-up)	0–3	Sambonifacese (C3)

Due to vacancies created in Lega Pro Seconda Divisione, the following five teams were ultimately promoted to play there for the 2008–09 season.

- Sambonifacese as play-off winners
- Colligiana as play-off finalists
- Alghero as semi-finalists
- Montichiari as semi-finalists
- Barletta as best second-placed team in group stage

== Tie-breakers ==
Girone C - 12th–13th place - played May 11, 2008

Team 1	Score	Team 2
Sandonà	1–4	Sanvitese

Sandonà forced to play in relegation playoffs

== Relegation playoffs ==
Played May 18 & 25, 2008
In case of aggregate tie score, higher classified team wins
Team highlighted in green saved, other is relegated to Eccellenza

Team 1	Agg.	Team 2	1st leg	2nd leg
Sanremese (A16)	3–5	(A13) Casale	1–3	2–2
Imperia (A15)	0–3	(A14) Novese	0–3	n/a
Fanfulla (B16)	6–1	(B13) Trento	2–0	4–1
Merate (B15)	1–3	(B14) US Sestese	0–2	1–1
Montecchio M. (C16)	4–1	(C13) Sandonà	1–1	3–0
Virtusvecomp (C15)	4–2	(C14) Este	0–0	4–2
Verucchio (D16)	5–6	(D13) Castellana	1–3	4–3
Cagliese (D15)	0–2	(D14) Russi	0–1	0–1
Torgiano (E16)	2–2	(E13) Sansepolcro	1–2	1–0
Montevarchi (E15)	3–2	(E14) Cecina	2–1	1–1
Tolentino (F16)	2–2	(F13) Luco Canistro	2–2	0–0
Narnese (F15)	1–2	(F14) Olympia Agnonese	0–1	1–1
Guidonia M. (G16)	1–3	(G13) Calangianus	0–1	1–2
Lupa Frascati (G15)	2–2	(G14) Morolo	2–0	0–2
Horatiana Venosa (H16)	2–3	(H13) Viribus Unitis	1–2	1–1
Matera (H15)	9–6	(H14) Quarto	5–1	4–5
Paternò (I16)	1–1	(I13) Sant'Antonio Abate	1–0	0–1
Castrovillari (I15)	3–1	(I14) Caserta	1–1	2–0
