= 2008–09 Serie D =

Serie D
- Season: 2008–09

Serie D, the fifth level of Italian Football, is usually composed of 162 teams divided into nine 18-team divisions. Special relegation of four teams from the professional leagues above Serie D after the team list had been set increased the total number of teams for this season to 166. One division will have 20 teams, two will have 19, while the other six will remain at 18 teams.

The regular Serie D season started September 7, 2008. Each team will play two matches against every other team in its own division; a total of 34 matches for 18-team divisions, 36 matches for the 19-team divisions, and 38 matches for the 20-team division. The nine division winners are automatically promoted to Lega Pro Seconda Divisione for the 2009-10 season, while the two last-placed teams are automatically relegated to Eccellenza.

After the regular season is complete, teams placed 6th-last through to 3rd-last in each division play a double-leg series (6th-last vs 3rd-last, 5th-last vs 4th-last) where the winners remain in Serie D the following season and the two losers are also relegated to Eccellenza for a total of 4 relegations in each division, 36 in total for the league.

The nine division winners enter a tournament to determine the over-all Serie D champion and is awarded the Scudetto Dilettanti.

Teams placed second through fifth in each division enter a playoff tournament after the regular season as well. Eventually, a final game determines which team finishes first and which teams comes in second in this 36-team playoff, and these teams may be bumped up to Lega Pro Seconda Divisione if one or more current Seconda Divisione teams runs into financial difficulties or is penalized.

== Events ==
=== Start of season ===
Given a normal season where there are no team failures and special promotions, Serie D would feature 9 teams that had been relegated from Lega Pro Seconda Divisione, 36 teams that had been promoted from Eccellenza, and 117 teams had played in Serie D the year before. Due to nine bankruptcies and non-admissions in the professional leagues above Serie D, the 2008-09 season was to feature only 5 teams that played in 2007–08 Serie C2, 36 teams that played in 2007–08 Eccellenza, and 121 teams that played in 2007–08 Serie D.

After the 162-team list was set, the league admitted four of the teams that had failed in the senior leagues. Messina & Spezia, both of whom played in 2007–08 Serie B, were placed in Girone I & Girone A respectively. Sporting Lucchese & Massese, both of whom played in 2007–08 Serie C1, were both placed in Girone E. The schedule in those 3 divisions needed to be expanded to accommodate these extra teams.

=== Promotions ===
On March 29, 2009 Siracusa became the first team to get promoted from Serie D in the season, winning the Girone I in advance of six weeks after a 2–0 home win to Rosarno that mathematically guaranteed a spot in the 2009–10 Lega Pro Seconda Divisione for the Sicilian side. They were followed one week later by Tuscans Sporting Lucchese, heir of AS Lucchese-Libertas, club formerly of Serie A and Serie B who was excluded from professional football only twelve months earlier. On April 26, Brindisi also obtained promotion to the fourth tier, after winning the Girone H in advance of three weeks.

On May 10, with only one weeks remaining in the league, four more teams mathematically won promotion to Lega Pro Seconda Divisione: Biellese (Girone A), Pro Belvedere Vercelli (Girone B), Sacilese (Girone C) and Villacidrese (Girone G). Seven days later the league winners list finally became complete, with Girone D winners Crociati Noceto (in a historical first promotion into professional football for the Emilian club) and Girone F champions Pro Vasto.

== Standings ==
updated to games played May 17, 2009

Promoted	To relegation playoffs	Directly relegated	Dissolved

=== Girone A ===
teams from Piedmont, Liguria & Aosta Valley

Pos	Team	Pld	Pts
1	Biellese (Note: Biellese has decided to self-relegate to Eccellenza 2009-10) (R)	36	82
2	Spezia (P)	36	78
3	Casale	36	66
4	Sarzanese	36	62
5	Albese	36	61
6	Pro Settimo	36	57
7	Savona	36	53
8	Derthona	36	52
9	Virtus Entella	36	50
10	Lavagnese	36	48
11	Cuneo	36	44
12	Rivoli	36	42
13	Rivarolese (R)	36	39
14	Sestri Levante (R)	36	35
15	Valle d'Aosta	36	34
16	Cirié (R)	36	33
17	Sestrese	36	31
18	Lottogiaveno (R)	36	30
19	Novese (R)	36	26

(P) Promoted; (R) Relegated

=== Girone B ===
teams from Lombardy & Piedmont

Pos	Team	Pld	Pts
1	Pro Belvedere Vercelli (P)	34	71
2	Renate	34	64
3	Colognese	34	60
4	US Sestese	34	60
5	AlzanoCene	34	59
6	Tritium	34	53
7	Turate	34	49
8	Darfo Boario	34	48
9	Voghera	34	45
10	Solbiatese	34	41
11	Nuova Verolese	34	39
12	Casteggio Broni	34	37
13	Olginatese	34	37
14	Caratese	34	36
15	Merate (R)	34	33
16	Calcio Caravaggese (R)	34	32
17	Borgomanero (R)	34	28
18	Fanfulla (R)	34	25

(P) Promoted; (R) Relegated

=== Girone C ===
teams from Veneto, Friuli-Venezia Giulia &
Trentino-Alto Adige/Südtirol

Pos	Team	Pld	Pts
1	Sacilese (P)	34	73
2	Eurotezze (Note: Eurotezze has decided not to join in Serie D 2009-10) (R)	34	65
3	Domegliara	34	59
4	Union Quinto	34	58
5	Chioggia S.	34	54
6	Pordenone	34	50
7	Belluno	34	49
8	Tamai	34	46
9	Virtus Verona	34	44
10	Sanvitese	34	44
11	Jesolo	34	42
12	Sagittaria Julia	34	42
13	Trento (R)	34	37
14	Somma (R)	34	35
15	Montebelluna	34	35
16	Montecchio M.	34	33
17	Sandonà (R)	34	30
18	Bolzano (R)	34	21

(P) Promoted; (R) Relegated

=== Girone D ===
teams from Lombardy, Emilia-Romagna,
Veneto & Tuscany

Pos	Team	Pld	Pts
1	Crociati Noceto (P)	34	67
2	Castellarano	34	61
3	Fiorenzuola	34	54
4	Salò (Note: Merger with Feralpi Lonato giving birth to FeralpiSalo admitted in Lega Pro Seconda divisione) (P)	34	50
5	Castel San Pietro	34	48
6	Feralpi Lonato (Note: Merger with Salò giving birth to FeralpiSalo admitted in Lega Pro Seconda divisione)	34	47
7	Este	34	46
8	Albignasego	34	45
9	Carpi	34	45
10	Calenzano	34	45
11	Mezzolara	34	45
12	Santarcangelo	34	44
13	Russi	34	43
14	Virtus Castelfranco	34	43
15	Suzzara (R)	34	37
16	Castellana	34	35
17	Comacchio Lidi (R)	34	35
18	Verucchio (R)	34	28

(P) Promoted; (R) Relegated

=== Girone E ===
teams from Tuscany, Umbria & Lazio

Pos	Team	Pld	Pts
1	Sporting Lucchese (P)	38	83
2	Sansepolcro	38	71
3	Gavorrano	38	65
4	Montevarchi	38	62
5	AS Sestese	38	62
6	Deruta	38	61
7	Arrone	38	61
8	Rieti	38	57
9	Pontedera	38	56
10	Cecina	38	52
11	Scandicci	38	50
12	Mobilieri Ponsacco	38	49 (Note: 1 point deducted)
13	Forcoli	38	47
14	Orvietana	38	46
15	Sansovino (R)	38	45
16	Fortis Juventus	38	44
17	Pontevecchio	38	41
18	Sangimignano	38	39
19	Armando Picchi (R)	38	34
20	Massese (R)	38	6 (Note: 2 points deducted)

(P) Promoted; (R) Relegated

=== Girone F ===
teams from Marche, Abruzzo &
Molise

Pos	Team	Pld	Pts
1	Pro Vasto (P)	34	71
2	Fano (P)	34	70
3	Casoli	34	65
4	Chieti	34	55
5	Campobasso	34	53 (Note: 3 points deducted)
6	Olympia Agnonese	34	53
7	R.C. Angolana	34	51
8	Santegidiese	34	46
9	Recanatese	34	45
10	Atl. Trivento	34	44
11	Morro d'Oro	34	39
12	Centobuchi	34	39
13	Elpidiense C.	34	36
14	Real Montecchio	34	33
15	Tolentino (R)	34	32
16	Luco Canistro	34	32
17	Maceratese (R)	34	30
18	Grottammare (R)	34	24

(P) Promoted; (R) Relegated

=== Girone G ===
teams from Lazio & Sardinia

Pos	Team	Pld	Pts
1	Villacidrese (P)	34	67
2	Tavolara	34	61
3	Viterbese	34	60
4	Gaeta	34	57
5	Arzachena	34	56
6	Boville Ernica	34	50
7	Budoni	34	49
8	Cynthia	34	49
9	Civita Castellana	34	44
10	Monterotondo	34	44
11	Astrea	34	42
12	Morolo	34	40
13	Lupa Frascati (R)	34	40
14	Castelsardo	34	40
15	Guidonia M.	34	38
16	Ferentino (Note: Merger with A.S. Ceccano giving birth to A.S.D. Ceccano) (R)	34	38
17	Civitavecchia (R)	34	36
18	Calangianus (R)	34	12

(P) Promoted; (R) Relegated

=== Girone H ===
teams from Campania, Apulia, Basilicata &
Molise

Pos	Team	Pld	Pts
1	Brindisi (P)	34	69 (Note: 1 point deducted)
2	Nocerina (P)	34	61
3	Pianura	34	60
4	Pomigliano	34	56
5	Ischia	34	55
6	Turris	34	54
7	Matera	34	47
8	FC Francavilla	34	47
9	Fasano	34	46
10	ASD Francavilla	34	46
11	Bacoli Sibilla	34	45
12	Angri	34	43
13	Sant'Antonio Abate	34	42
14	Bitonto	34	38
15	Grottaglie	34	36
16	Sporting Genzano (R)	34	32
17	Gelbison Cilento (R)	34	24
18	Venafro (R)	34	20

(P) Promoted; (R) Relegated

=== Girone I ===
teams from Campania, Calabria, Basilicata, Sicily & Molise

Pos	Team	Pld	Pts
1	Siracusa (P)	36	81
2	Vico Equense (P)	36	64
3	Sapri	36	60
4	Nissa	36	60
5	Adrano	36	55
6	Rosarno	36	53
7	Viribus Unitis	36	52
8	Neapolis Mugnano	36	51
9	HinterReggio	36	50
10	Libertas Acate	36	49
11	Acicatena	36	48
12	Messina	36	47
13	Trapani	36	46
14	Palazzolo	36	41
15	Puteolana (R)	36	41
16	Castrovillari	36	38
17	Vittoria (R)	36	31
18	Savoia (R)	36	30
19	Castiglione (R)	36	20

(P) Promoted; (R) Relegated

== Division winners ==
All teams promoted to 2009–10 Lega Pro Seconda Divisione

Division	Winners
A	Biellese
B	P.B. Vercelli
C	Sacilese
D	Crociati Noceto
E	Sporting Lucchese
F	Pro Vasto
G	Villacidrese
H	Brindisi
I	Siracusa

== Scudetto Dilettanti ==
=== First round ===
- division winners placed into 3 groups of 3
- group winners and best second-placed team qualify for semi-finals

==== Group A ====
Pos	Team	Pld	W	D	L	GF	GA	GD	Pts
1	Biellese (A)	2	1	1	0	7	5	+2	4
2	Sacilese (C)	2	1	1	0	5	4	+1	4
3	P.B. Vercelli (B)	2	0	0	2	1	4	−3	0

P.B. Vercelli (B)	0–1	Sacilese (C)	played May 24, 2009
Biellese (A)	3–1	P.B. Vercelli (B)	played May 27, 2009
Sacilese (C)	4–4	Biellese (A)	played May 30, 2009

==== Group B ====
Pos	Team	Pld	W	D	L	GF	GA	GD	Pts
1	Pro Vasto (F)	2	1	1	0	6	5	+1	4
2	Crociati Noceto (D)	2	0	2	0	7	7	0	2
3	Sporting Lucchese (E)	2	0	1	1	4	5	−1	1

Pro Vasto (F)	2–1	Sporting Lucchese (E)	played May 24, 2009
Sporting Lucchese (E)	3–3	Crociati Noceto (D)	played May 27, 2009
Crociati Noceto (D)	4–4	Pro Vasto (F)	played May 31, 2009

==== Group C ====
Pos	Team	Pld	W	D	L	GF	GA	GD	Pts
1	Siracusa (I)	2	1	1	0	4	3	+1	4
2	Brindisi (H)	2	1	1	0	2	1	+1	4
3	Villacidrese (G)	2	0	0	2	4	6	−2	0

Siracusa (I)	0–0	Brindisi (H)	played May 24, 2009
Villacidrese (G)	3–4	Siracusa (I)	played May 27, 2009
Brindisi (H)	2–1	Villacidrese (G)	played May 31, 2009

=== Semi-finals ===
First legs played June 6 & 7, 2009; return legs played June 13, 2009

Team 1	Agg.	Team 2	1st leg	2nd leg
Biellese (A)	3-3	Siracusa (I)	2-2	1-1
Pro Vasto (F)	6-4	Sacilese (C)	4-2	2-2

=== Final ===
Played June 20, 2009 in Aprilia, Lazio

Team 1	Score	Team 2
Pro Vasto (F)	3-0	Siracusa (I)

game suspended at the half with Pro Vasto leading 2-0 due to rioting by Siracusa fans
championship awarded to Pro Vasto with a 3-0 final score
Winners: Pro Vasto (F)

== Tie-breakers ==
- before the promotion and relegation playoffs could begin, four tie-breakers needed to be played.

Girone B - 12th-13th place - played May 24, 2009

Team 1	Score	Team 2
Olginatese	1-2	Casteggio Broni

Casteggio Broni saved, Olginatese forced to play in relegation playoffs

Girone D - 16th-17th place - played May 24, 2009

Team 1	Score	Team 2
Comacchio Lidi	0-1	Castellana

Castellana to play in relegation playoffs, Comacchio Lidi directly relegated

Girone F - 5th-6th place - played May 24, 2009

Team 1	Score	Team 2
Campobasso	1-1(5-4)(p)	Olympia Agnonese

only Campobasso qualified to play in promotional playoffs

Girone G - 12th-13th place - played May 24, 2009

- Morolo, Castelsardo & Lupa Frascati each finished with 40 points, tied for 12th position
- Head-to-head results: Morolo - 7 points, Castelsardo - 7, Lupa Frascati -3
- Lupa Frascati places 14th and forced to play in relegation playoffs, other two qualify for tie-breaker.

Team 1	Score	Team 2
Morolo	2-0	Castelsardo

Morolo saved, Castelsardo forced to play in relegation playoffs

== Promotion playoffs ==
=== Rules ===
- promotion playoffs involved a total of 36 teams; four from each of the nine Serie D divisions (teams placed from 2nd through to 5th with one exception)
- new for 2007-08, the Coppa Italia Serie D winner is directly admitted to the semi-final round. The 2008-09 cup winner was Sapri.
- since Sapri finished 3rd in division I, teams finishing 2nd, 4th, 5th & 6th were admitted to the playoffs in that division
- the first two rounds were one-legged matches played in the home field of the best-placed team.
- games ending in ties were extended to extra time. New for the 2007-08 season, the higher classified team was declared the winner if the game was still tied after extra time. Penalty kicks were not taken.
- Round one matched 2nd & 5th-placed teams, and 3rd & 4th-placed teams within each division, except for division I
- The two winners from each division played each other in the second round.
- The nine winners - one each from the nine Serie D divisions - were then split into three groups of three teams each. Every team played two matches, one against each of the other two opponents within the group. The three group winners qualified for the semifinal round, joining Sapri
- the semi-finals were two-legged matches, and the respective winners moved on to play in a one-legged final hosted in a neutral ground.
- the tournament results provided a list, starting with the winner, by which vacancies could be filled in Lega Pro Seconda Divisione

=== First round ===
- Played on May 27, 2009; single-legged matches played at best placed club home field
- 2nd-placed team plays 5th-placed team, 3rd-placed team plays 4th placed team
- games ending in a tie are extended to extra time, if still tied, the higher-classified team wins

Team 1	Score	Team 2
Spezia (A2)	2–1	(A5) Albese
Casale Calcio (A3)	4–2	(A4) Sarzanese
Renate (B2)	3–0	(B5) AlzanoCene
Colognese (B3)	2–1	(B4) US Sestese
Eurotezze (C2)	0–1	(C5) Chioggia S.
Domegliara (C3)	0–2(aet)	(C4) Union Quinto
Castellarano (D2)	2–1	(D5) Castel San Pietro
Fiorenzuola (D3)	2–3	(D4) Salò
Sansepolcro (E2)	2–1	(E5) AS Sestese
Gavorrano (E3)	2–0	(E4) Montevarchi
Fano (F2)	3–2(aet)	(F5) Nuovo Campobasso
Casoli (F3)	2–1	(F4) Chieti
Tavolara (G2)	1–2	(G5) Arzachena
Viterbese (G3)	2–1	(G4) Gaeta
Nocerina (H2)	5–0	(H5) Ischia
Pianura (H3)	3–2	(H4) Pomigliano
Vico Equense (I2)	3–0	(I6) Rosarno
Nissa (I4)	0–1(aet)	(I5) Adrano

=== Second round ===
- Played on May 31, 2009; single-legged matches played at best placed club home field
- games ending in a tie are extended to extra time, if still tied, the higher-classified team wins

Team 1	Score	Team 2
Spezia (A2)	1–1(aet)	(A3) Casale
Renate (B2)	2–1	(B3) Colognese
Union Quinto (C4)	1–2	(C5) Chioggia S.
Castellarano (D2)	0–3	(D4) Salò
Sansepolcro (E2)	0–1	(E3) Gavorrano
Fano (F2)	1–1(aet)	(F3) Casoli
Viterbese (G3)	4–1	(G5) Arzachena
Nocerina (H2)	1–0(aet)	(H3) Pianura
Vico Equense (I2)	1–0	(I5) Adrano

=== Third round ===
- group winners qualify for semi-finals

==== Group A ====
Pos	Team	Pld	W	D	L	GF	GA	GD	Pts
1	Renate (B2)	2	1	0	1	4	4	0	3
2	Viterbese (G3)	2	1	0	1	3	3	0	3
3	Chioggia S. (C5)	2	1	0	1	2	2	0	3

Chioggia S. (C5)	0–1	(G3) Viterbese	June 7, 2009
Renate (B2)	1–2	(C5) Chioggia S.	June 10, 2009
Viterbese (G3)	2–3	(B2) Renate	June 14, 2009

==== Group B ====
Pos	Team	Pld	W	D	L	GF	GA	GD	Pts
1	Vico Equense (I2)	2	1	1	0	3	1	+2	4
2	Spezia (A2)	2	1	0	1	3	2	+1	3
3	Fano (F2)	2	0	1	1	1	4	−3	1

Spezia (A2)	3–0	(F2) Fano	June 7, 2009
Fano (F2)	1–1	(I2) Vico Equense	June 10, 2009
Vico Equense (I2)	2–0	(A2) Spezia	June 14, 2009

==== Group C ====
Pos	Team	Pld	W	D	L	GF	GA	GD	Pts
1	Nocerina (H2)	2	1	0	1	5	4	+1	3
2	Salò (D4)	2	1	0	1	3	2	+1	3
3	Gavorrano (E3)	2	1	0	1	2	4	−2	3

Gavorrano (E3)	1–0	(D4) Salò	June 7, 2009
Salò (D4)	3–1	(H2) Nocerina	June 10, 2009
Nocerina (H2)	4–1	(E3) Gavorrano	June 14, 2009

=== Semi-finals ===
First legs played June 17, 2009; return legs played June 21, 2009

Team 1	Agg.	Team 2	1st leg	2nd leg
Renate (B2)	0-2	Vico Equense (I2)	0-1	0-1
Nocerina (H2)	4-4	Sapri (Cup Winner)	2-1	2-3

=== Final ===
Played June 30, 2009 in Rieti, Lazio

Team 1	Score	Team 2
Nocerina (H2)	3-1	Vico Equense (I2)

== Relegation playoffs ==
Played May 31 & June 7, 2009
in case of aggregate tie score, higher classified team wins
team highlighted in green saved, other is relegated to Eccellenza

Team 1	Agg.	Team 2	1st leg	2nd leg
Sestrese(A17)	4-2	(A14)Sestri Levante	4-1	0-1
Cirié(A16)	2-5	(A15)Valle d'Aosta	1-1	1-4
Calcio Caravaggese(B16)	1-1	(B13)Olginatese	0-0	1-1
Merate(B15)	1-1	(B14)Caratese	1-0	0-1
Montecchio M.(C16)	4-2	(C13)Trento	1-1	3-1
Montebelluna(C15)	2-1	(C14)Somma	1-0	1-1
Castellana(D16)	3-2	(D13)Russi	1-0	2-2
Suzzara(D15)	1-1	(D14)Virtus Castelfranco	0-0	1-1
Sangimignano(E18)	3-1	(E15)Sansovino	1-0	2-1
Pontevecchio(E17)	2-2	(E16)Fortis Juventus	2-1	0-1
Luco Canistro(F16)	2-1	(F13)Elpidiense C.	0-1	2-0
Tolentino(F15)	0-1	(F14)Real Montecchio	0-0	0-1
Guidonia M.(G16)	5-1	(G13)Lupa Frascati	3-0	2-1
Ferentino(G15)	1-1	(G14)Castelsardo	1-1	0-0
Sporting Genzano(H16)	0-3	(H13)Sant'Antonio	0-1	0-2
Grottaglie(H15)	0-1	(H14)Bitonto	0-0	0-1
Vittoria(I17)	1-1	(I14)Palazzolo	1-0	0-1
Castrovillari(I16)	2-1	(I15)Puteolana	1-0	1-1
