= 2006–07 Eccellenza =

This is a list of division winners and playoff matches in the regionally organized Eccellenza 2006–2007.

== Division winners ==
	Region/Division	Winners
1	Abruzzo	Cologna Paese
2	Basilicata	Horatiana Venosa
3	Calabria	Rosarno
4	Campania – A	Caserta
5	Campania – B	Gelbison Cilento
6	Emilia-Romagna – A	Crociati Parma
7	Emilia-Romagna – B	Real Cesenatico
8	Friuli-Venezia Giulia	Sarone
9	Lazio – A	Bassano Romano
10	Lazio – B	Lupa Frascati
11	Liguria	Sestrese
12	Lombardy – A	Sestese
13	Lombardy – B	Caratese
14	Lombardy – C	Feralpi Lonato
15	Marche	Recanatese
16	Molise	Olympia Agnonese
17	Piedmont & Aosta Valley – A	Favria
18	Piedmont & Aosta Valley – B	Derthona
19	Apulia	Fasano
20	Sardinia	Tavolara
21	Sicily – A	Alcamo
22	Sicily – B	Acate-Modica
23	Tuscany – A	Gavorrano
24	Tuscany – B	Colligiana
25	Trentino-Alto Adige/Südtirol	Alta Vallagarina
26	Umbria	Pontevecchio
27	Veneto – A	Domegliara
28	Veneto – B	Sandonà

== Regional playoffs ==
=== Rules ===
In the regional playoffs, each Regional Committee can decide its own rules to admit a single team to the national phase. In the 2006–07 season, Liguria, Trentino-Alto Adige/Südtirol, Veneto, Friuli-Venezia Giulia, Emilia-Romagna and Lazio opted not to organize any regional playoff, preferring instead to admit the runner-up team directly to the national phase, whereas all other regional committees organized playoffs between teams from second to fifth place, with the exception of Piedmont, that organized a playoff between only three teams (from second to fourth place).

=== Piedmont A ===
Playoff semifinals

Team 1	Agg.	Team 2	1st leg	2nd leg
Biella V.L. Cossatese	1–4	Settimo	0–2	1–2

Playoff finals

Team 1	Agg.	Team 2	1st leg	2nd leg
Rivoli Collegno	4–2	Settimo	1–1	3–1

Teams admitted to playoffs
Position	Team	Points
2nd	Rivoli Collegno	70
3rd	Biella V.L. Cossatese	50
4th	Settimo	49

=== Piedmont B ===
Playoff semifinals

Team 1	Agg.	Team 2	1st leg	2nd leg
Acqui	(b)3–3	Bra	2–3	1–0

Playoff finals

Team 1	Agg.	Team 2	1st leg	2nd leg
Novese	3–1	Acqui	1–1	2–0

Teams admitted to playoffs
Position	Team	Points
2nd	Novese	63
3rd	Acqui	57
4th	Bra	53

=== Lombardy A ===
Preliminary playoff

Team 1	Score	Team 2
Corsico	2–0	Gallaratese

Playoff semifinals

Team 1	Score	Team 2
Corsico	3–1	Sancolombano
Brembio	1–0	Saronno

Playoff final

Team 1	Score	Team 2
Brembio	1–2	Corsico

Teams admitted to playoffs
Position	Team	Points
2nd	Sancolombano	65
3rd	Saronno	64
4th	Brembio	63
5th	Gallaratese	63
6th	Corsico	63

=== Lombardy B ===
Playoff semifinals

Team 1	Score	Team 2
Voluntas Osio di Sotto	1–2	Base 96
Cinisellese	2–2(b)	Cantù

Playoff final

Team 1	Score	Team 2
Cantù	1–2	Base 96

Teams admitted to playoffs
Position	Team	Points
2nd	Cantù San Paolo	65
3rd	Base 96	56
4th	Cinisellese	61
5th	Voluntas Osio di Sotto	61

=== Lombardy C ===
Playoff semifinals

Team 1	Score	Team 2
Suzzara	2–0	Caravaggio
Trevigliese	3–2	Chiari

Playoff final

Team 1	Score	Team 2
Suzzara	2–4	Trevigliese

Teams admitted to playoffs
Position	Team	Points
2nd	Trevigliese	65
3rd	Suzzara	62
4th	Caravaggio	61
5th	Chiari	61

=== Tuscany A ===
Playoff semifinals

Team 1	Agg.	Team 2	1st leg	2nd leg
Larcianese	1–4	Lunigiana	0–2	1–2
Calenzano	(b)1–1	Castelfiorentino	1–1	0–0

Playoff final

Team 1	Agg.	Team 2	1st leg	2nd leg
Lunigiana	1–3	Calenzano	1–0	0–3

Teams admitted to playoffs
Position	Team	Points
2nd	Larcianese	58
3rd	Calenzano	50
4th	Castelfiorentino	50
5th	Lunigiana	48

=== Tuscany B ===
Playoff semifinals

Team 1	Agg.	Team 2	1st leg	2nd leg
Scandicci	3–2	Castelnuovese	1–1	2–1
Monteriggioni	(b)2–2	M.M. Subbiano	1–1	1–1

Playoff final

Team 1	Agg.	Team 2	1st leg	2nd leg
Scandicci	3–0	Monteriggioni	0–0	3–0

Teams admitted to playoffs
Position	Team	Points
2nd	Scandicci	57
3rd	Monteriggioni	51
4th	M.M. Subbiano	49
5th	Castelnuovese	47

=== Umbria ===
Playoff semifinals

Team 1	Agg.	Team 2	1st leg	2nd leg
Torgiano	2–1	Bastia	0–0	2–1
Deruta	0–1	Todi	0–0	0–1

Playoff final

Team 1	Score	Team 2
Torgiano	2–0(aet)	Todi

Teams admitted to playoffs
Position	Team	Points
2nd	Todi	65
3rd	Torgiano	64
4th	Bastia	54
5th	Deruta	53

=== Marche ===
Playoff semifinals

Team 1	Agg.	Team 2	1st leg	2nd leg
B.Fossombrone	2–1	Fermignanese	0–0	2–1
Piano San Lazzaro	3–1	Monturanese	0–0	3–1

Playoff final

Team 1	Score	Team 2
B.Fossombrone	1–0	Piano San Lazzaro

Teams admitted to playoffs
Position	Team	Points
2nd	B.Fossombrone	63
3rd	Piano San Lazzaro	54
4th	Monturanese	51
5th	Fermignanese	51

=== Abruzzo ===
Playoff semifinals

Team 1	Agg.	Team 2	1st leg	2nd leg
San Nicolò	0–1	Hatria	0–0	0–1
Miglianico	2–5	Notaresco	1–3	1–2

Playoff final

Team 1	Score	Team 2
Hatria	1–3	Notaresco

Teams admitted to playoffs
Position	Team	Points
2nd	San Nicolò	68
3rd	Miglianico	60
4th	Notaresco	59
5th	Hatria	56

=== Molise ===
Playoff semifinals

Team 1	Agg.	Team 2	1st leg	2nd leg
Atletico Trivento	2–3	Termoli	1–2	1–1
Guglionesi	2–1	Campobasso '19	1–1	1–0

Playoff final

Team 1	Score	Team 2
Termoli	3–2	Guglionesi

Teams admitted to playoffs
Position	Team	Points
2nd	Atletico Trivento	60
3rd	Guglionesi	59
4th	Campobasso '19	54
5th	Termoli	52

=== Campania A ===
Playoff semifinals

Team 1	Score	Team 2
Pianura	(b)1–1	Internapoli
Gladiator	0–2	Quarto

Playoff final

Team 1	Score	Team 2
Pianura	1–2	Quarto

Teams admitted to playoffs
Position	Team	Points
2nd	Pianura	65
3rd	Gladiator	62
4th	Quarto	58
5th	Internapoli	57

=== Campania B ===
Playoff semifinals

Team 1	Score	Team 2
Gragnano	(b)0–0	Baronissi
Alba Durazzano	0–1	Battipagliese

Playoff final

Team 1	Score	Team 2
Gragnano	3–1	Battipagliese

Teams admitted to playoffs
Position	Team	Points
2nd	Gragnano	74
3rd	Alba Durazzano	61
4th	Battipagliese	56
5th	Baronissi	47

=== Apulia ===
Playoff semifinals

Team 1	Agg.	Team 2	1st leg	2nd leg
Noci	(b)2–2	Lucera	1–1	1–1
Audace Cerignola	(b)3–3	Molfetta	1–2	2–1

Playoff final

Team 1	Agg.	Team 2	1st leg	2nd leg
Noci	1–3	Audace Cerignola	0–2	1–1

Teams admitted to playoffs
Position	Team	Points
2nd	Noci	65
3rd	Audace Cerignola	62
4th	Molfetta	61
5th	Lucera	54

=== Basilicata ===
Playoff semifinals

Team 1	Agg.	Team 2	1st leg	2nd leg
Atella Monticchio	0–1	Vultur Rionero	0–1	0–0
Avigliano	(b)1–1	Ricigliano	1–0	0–1

Playoff final

Team 1	Agg.	Team 2	1st leg	2nd leg
Vultur Rionero	1–2	Avigliano		

Teams admitted to playoffs
Position	Team	Points
2nd	Atella Monticchio	67
3rd	Avigliano	66
4th	Ricigliano	60
5th	Vultur Rionero	59

=== Calabria ===
Playoff semifinals

Team 1	Agg.	Team 2	1st leg	2nd leg
Taurianovese	3–1	Hinterreggio	1–0	2–1
Acri	1–3	Scalea	0–1	1–2

Playoff final

Team 1	Agg.	Team 2	1st leg	2nd leg
Taurianovese	3–0	Scalea	1–0	2–0

Teams admitted to playoffs
Position	Team	Points
2nd	Taurianovese	65
3rd	Acri	47
4th	Scalea	47
5th	Hinterreggio	43

=== Sicily A ===
Playoff semifinals

Team 1	Score	Team 2
Carini	2–1	Nissa
Mazara	(b)0–0	Kamarat

Playoff final

Team 1	Score	Team 2
Carini	(b)1–1	Mazara

Teams admitted to playoffs
Position	Team	Points
2nd	Carini	57
3rd	Mazara	53
4th	Kamarat	50
5th	Nissa	47

=== Sicily B ===
Playoff semifinals

Team 1	Score	Team 2
Villafranca Tirrena	(b)1–1	Orlandina
Palazzolo	(b)1–1	Trecastagni

Playoff final

Team 1	Score	Team 2
Villafranca Tirrena	0–1	Palazzolo

Teams admitted to playoffs
Position	Team	Points
2nd	Villafranca Tirrena	62
3rd	Palazzolo	62
4th	Trecastagni	59
5th	Orlandina	46

=== Sardinia ===
Playoff semifinals

Team 1	Agg.	Team 2	1st leg	2nd leg
Budoni	(b)0–0	San Teodoro	0–0	0–0
Castelsardo	2–4	Quartu 2000	2–3	0–1

Playoff final

Team 1	Score	Team 2
Budoni	2–1	Quartu 2000

Teams admitted to playoffs
Position	Team	Points
2nd	Budoni	73
3rd	Castelsardo	59
4th	Quartu 2000	57
5th	San Teodoro	57

- (b) — Team who best placed in the regular season qualifies for the next round.

== National playoffs ==
=== Rules ===
The national playoffs involved a total of 28 teams, respectively the regional playoff winners or the second-placed teams in case regional playoffs were not organized by the correspondent committee. A total of two two-legged rounds are played in order to fill the remaining seven Serie D spots.

=== First round ===
First leg: matches A to N on May 27, matches O to P on June 3
Second leg: matches A to N on June 3, matches O to P on June 10

	Team 1	Agg.	Team 2	1st leg	2nd leg
A|	Virtus Entella (Liguria)	1–2	Asolo Fonte (Veneto B)	0–0	1–2
B|	Corsico (Lombardy A)	1–0	Noventa Padovana (Veneto A)	1–0	0–0
C|	Alense Vivaldi (Trentino)	1–3	Novese (Piedmont B)	0–3	1–0
D|	Base 96 (Lombardy B)	3–2	Monfalcone (Friuli V.G.)	3–1	0–1
E|	Trevigliese (Lombardy C)	0–0 (p)4–1	Rivoli Collegno (Piedmont A)	0–0	0–0
F|	Notaresco (Abruzzo)	3–5	Cynthia 1920 (Lazio B)	3–4	0–1
G|	Fiorenzuola (Emilia-Romagna A)	3–5	Savignanese (Emilia-Romagna B)	1–4	2–1
H|	Calenzano (Tuscany A)	1–3	Scandicci (Tuscany B)	1–1	0–2
I|	Ciampino (Lazio A)	3–4	Budoni (Sardinia)	3–2	0–2
L|	Torgiano (Umbria)	1–0	B.Fossombrone (Marche)	0–0	1–0
M|	Taurianovese (Calabria)	2–1	Termoli (Molise)	2–1	0–0
N|	Audace Cerignola (Apulia)	3–4	Carini (Sicily A)	3–2	0–2
O|	Palazzolo (Sicily B)	1–5	Gragnano (Campania B)	1–2	0–3
P|	Quarto (Campania A)	4–1	Avigliano (Basilicata)	3–0	1–1

=== Second round ===
First leg: matches 1 to 5 on June 10; matches 6 & 7 on June 17
Second leg: matches 1 to 5 on June 17; matches 6 & 7 on June 24

	Team 1	Agg.	Team 2	1st leg	2nd leg
1|	Base 96 (Lombardy B)	1–0	Trevigliese (Lombardy C)	1–0	0–0
2|	Novese (Piedmont B)	2–0	Corsico (Lombardy A)	1–0	1–0
3|	Asolo Fonte (Veneto B)	2–6	Cynthia 1920 (Lazio B)	2–1	0–5
4|	Budoni (Sardinia)	1–2	Torgiano (Umbria)	0–1	1–1
5|	Scandicci (Tuscany B)	6–2	Savignanese (Emilia-Romagna B)	1–0	5–1
6|	Quarto (Campania A)	4–2	Taurianovese (Calabria)	4–1	0–1
7|	Carini (Sicily A)	1–2	Gragnano (Campania B)	1–0	0–2
