= Salvatore Jacolino =

Italian footballer and manager

Personal information
- Date of birth: 24 December 1950 (age 75)
- Place of birth: Agrigento, Italy
- Height: 1.73 m (5 ft 8 in)
- Position: Midfielder

Team information
- Current team: Savona (manager)

Senior career*
Years	Team	Apps	(Gls)
1969–1970	Juventus	1	(0)
1970–1971	Piacenza	24	(7)
1971–1973	Ternana	43	(3)
1973–1976	Brescia	86	(9)
1976–1977	SPAL	31	(1)
1977–1981	Biellese	113	(21)

Managerial career
- 1984–1998: Juventus (youth)
- 1998: Viterbese
- 1999: Cuneo
- 2000–2001: Borgosesia
- 2001–2002: Ivrea
- 2002–2003: Biellese
- 2003–2005: Casale
- 2005–2007: Canavese
- 2007–2009: Alessandria
- 2009–2010: Savona
- 2010–2011: Cuneo
- * Club domestic league appearances and goals

Salvatore Jacolino (born 24 December 1950 in Agrigento) is an Italian professional football coach and former player.
