= Massimiliano Iezzi =

Italian footballer

Personal information
- Date of birth: 1 February 1981 (age 45)
- Place of birth: Monterotondo, Italy
- Height: 1.81 m (5 ft 11 in)
- Positions: Midfielder; forward

Senior career*
Years	Team	Apps	(Gls)
1998–1999	Roma	0	(0)
1999–2001	West Bromwich Albion	0	(0)
2001	Parma	0	(0)
2001–2003	Benevento	42	(1)
2003	Ravenna	11	(1)
2004	Gubbio	14	(0)
2004–2005	Viterbese	34	(1)
2005	Polonia Warsaw	3	(0)
2006–2007	Nuorese	25	(1)
2007–2008	Paganese	3	(0)
2008	Nuorese	10	(0)
2008	Castelsardo	9	(1)
2008–2009	Terracina		
2009	Fidelis Andria 2018		
2009–2010	Colleferro	21	(2)
2010–2012	Civitavecchia		
2013	Anziolavinio	8	(0)
2013–2014	Civitavecchia		
2014–2017	Real Monterotondo Scalo		
2017–2020	Aranova		
- * Club domestic league appearances and goals

Massimiliano Iezzi (born 1 February 1981) is an Italian former professional footballer.

== Career ==
Iezzi started his senior career with AS Roma. In 2005, he signed for Polonia Warsaw in the Polish Ekstraklasa, where he made seven appearances and scored zero goals. After that, he played for Italian clubs Nuorese, Paganese, Castelsardo, Terracina, Fidelis Andria 2018, Colleferro, Civitavecchia, Anziolavinio, Real Monterotondo Scalo and Aranova, where he retired.
