= Osarimen Ebagua =

Nigerian footballer (born 1986)

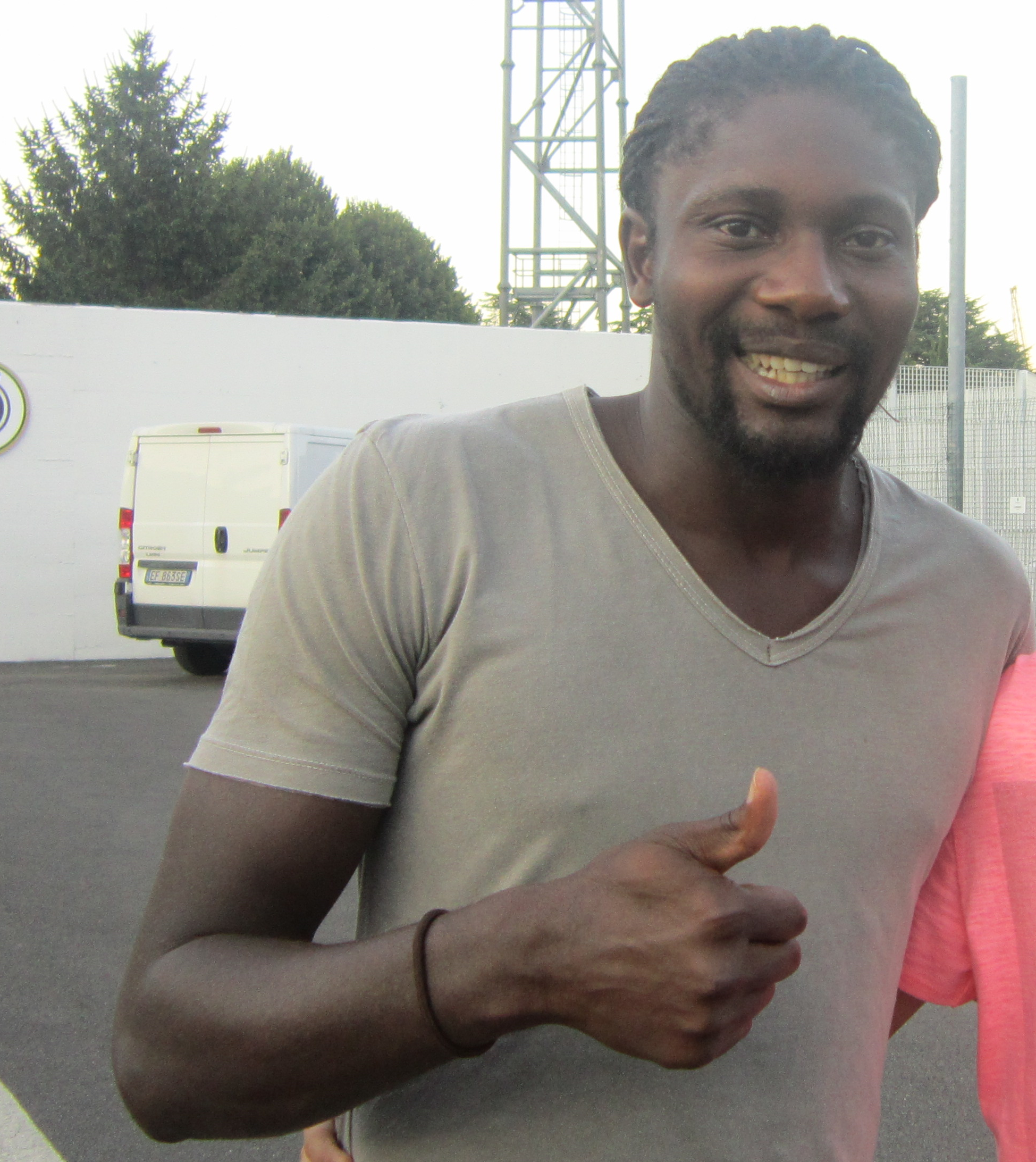
- Ebagua in 2013

Personal information
- Full name: Osarimen Giulio Ebagua
- Date of birth: 6 June 1986 (age 40)
- Place of birth: Benin City, Nigeria
- Height: 1.84 m (6 ft 0 in)
- Position: Striker

Team information
- Current team: Città di Varese
- Number: 10

Youth career
- 1997–2005: Torino

Senior career*
Years	Team	Apps	(Gls)
2005–2007	Casale	48	(11)
2007–2008	Novara	4	(0)
2008	→ Pescara (loan)	3	(0)
2008–2009	Canavese	28	(11)
2009–2011	Varese	44	(19)
2011–2012	Torino	20	(3)
2012	→ Catania (loan)	3	(0)
2012–2013	Varese	35	(17)
2013–2015	Spezia	48	(16)
2015	→ Bari (loan)	16	(2)
2015	Como	18	(3)
2016	Vicenza	17	(5)
2016–2017	Pro Vercelli	19	(1)
2017	→ Vicenza (loan)	3	(1)
2017–2018	Baniyas		
2019–2020	Bisceglie	16	(3)
2021–	Città di Varese	16	(5)
- * Club domestic league appearances and goals as of 17:01, 13 August 2021 (UTC)

Osarimen Giulio Ebagua (born 6 June 1986) is a Nigerian professional footballer who plays as a forward for Serie D Group A club Città di Varese.

== Club career ==
=== Early career ===
Born in Nigeria, he moved to Italy with his father when he was one month old. He lived in Rome, and then Turin, later becoming an Italian citizen. He started his professional career with Serie C2 side Casale, 60 km from Turin. He also played for Torino Berretti and Primavera Team, before being released in June 2005 after the old Torino went bankrupt. After the relegation of Casale, he joined Serie C2 side Portogruaro Summaga but soon returned to Casale in Serie D. In the 2007–08 season, he left for another Piedmont club, Novara, but failed to play regularly in Serie C1. In January 2008, he left for a short spell with Serie C1 club Pescara. In July 2008, he joined Canavese. He scored 11 goals for Canavese in Lega Pro Seconda Divisione.

=== Varese ===
In July 2009, he was signed by Varese along with fellow countrymen Wilfred Osuji and Kingsley Umunegbu. His first season with the club eventually proved to be very successful. Ebagua went on to make 27 league appearances and scoring 12 goals, contributing to the return of Varese to Serie B for this first time in 25 years. Following a successful first season with the club, Ebagua continued his goal scoring displays in the 2010–11 Serie B campaign as he would help guide the club to a promotion play-off spot with his 12 goals in 30 matches. Varese eventually lost in their quest for two-consecutive promotions, and Ebagua was eventually sold to Serie B rivals Torino F.C. in co-ownership deal for €1.2 million cash plus half of Gaetano Carrieri in June 2011.

=== Torino ===
In his first five months with his new club, Ebagua failed to replicate his form from Varese, and managed just 3 goals in 20 league appearances. He was subsequently loaned out in the 2012 winter transfer window following the arrival of Cristian Pasquato from Juventus.

On 31 January 2012, he officially joined Serie A side Catania on loan from Torino for the rest of the season. The club was looking to add depth to their front line following the departure of Maxi López to Milan.

=== Bisceglie ===
After not playing in the 2018–19 season, on 9 August 2019 he signed with Serie C club Bisceglie.

=== Città di Varese ===
On 23 January 2021, Ebagua joined Serie D side Città di Varese.
