= Walter Corsanini =

Italian footballer

Personal information
- Date of birth: July 25, 1911
- Place of birth: Cremona, Italy
- Position: Midfielder

Senior career*
Years	Team	Apps	(Gls)
1927–1929	Cremonese	4	(3)
1929–1931	Roma	2	(0)
1931–1933	Cremonese	15	(8)
1933–1935	L'Aquila		
1935–1936	Mantova	14	(1)
1936–1937	Cosenza		
1937–1939	Salernitana		
- * Club domestic league appearances and goals

Walter Corsanini (born July 25, 1911, in Cremona) was an Italian professional football player.

He played 2 games in the Serie A in the 1929/30 season for A.S. Roma. In 1954 he founded the ice cream company Walcor.
