= Davide Marchini =

Italian footballer (born 1981)

Personal information
- Date of birth: 23 February 1981 (age 45)
- Place of birth: Portomaggiore, Italy
- Height: 1.80 m (5 ft 11 in)
- Position: Midfielder

Youth career
- 1998–1999: Spal

Senior career*
Years	Team	Apps	(Gls)
1999–2002	San Marino	43	(1)
2002–2003	Alzano Virescit	26	(0)
2003–2004	Lanciano	25	(0)
2004–2005	Chievo	0	(0)
2005–2006	Sassari Torres	21	(3)
2006–2009	Triestina	30	(2)
2007	→ Cagliari (loan)	17	(3)
2007–2008	→ Cagliari (co-ownership)	1	(0)
2008–2009	→ Bologna (loan)	18	(0)
2009–2010	Livorno	16	(0)
2010–2012	Spezia	29	(2)
2012	SPAL	2	(0)
2013	Comacchio Lidi		
2015–2016	Argentana		

Managerial career
- 2017–2019: Progresso
- 2020–2021: Sasso Marconi
- * Club domestic league appearances and goals

Davide Marchini (born 23 February 1981) is an Italian football coach and a former player.

== Career ==
Marchini joined Chievo in 2003 on free transfer after the bankrupt of Alzano. Hr then joined Lanciano in co-ownership deal. He then signed by Sassari Torres in January 2005 and played two half season. In January 2006 he was signed by Triestina, where he played another half + half season.

=== Cagliari, Bologna & Livorno ===
In January 2007 he was loaned to Cagliari with option to joint-ownership (with Andrea Peana moved to opposite direction). He made his Serie A debut on 21 January 2007 against Calcio Catania. But in next season, Marchini only played once for Cagliari on Derby delle Isole in September. He was allowed to leave for injured his hand and family reason in October. But La Gazzetta dello Sport revealed that he was suspended by the club due to conflicts between Pasquale Foggia during training and later Marchini fight with others in a bar. Cagliari denied the fight was related to Foggia.

In June 2008 Triestina bought back Marchini and loaned him to Serie A newcomer Bologna. In July 2009, he joined Livorno, also newly promoted to Serie A.

=== Spezia & SPAL ===
On 20 August 2010, Marchini left for Spezia Calcio of the third division. Marchini played 3 times for Spezia in 2011–12 Lega Pro Prima Divisione. On 2 January 2012, Marchini terminated his contract with the club. On 31 January 2012, he signed a contract with SPAL 1907.

== Honours ==
- Lega Pro Prima Divisione: 2011–12 (Spezia)
