= Carrieri =

Carrieri is an Italian surname. Notable people with the surname include:

- Chris Carrieri (born 1980), American soccer player
- Gaetano Carrieri (born 1988), Italian footballer
- Matthew Carrieri (c. 1420–1470), Dominican friar
- Vincenza Carrieri-Russo
