= List of AC ChievoVerona seasons =

A.C. ChievoVerona is an Italian professional football club based in Verona, Veneto, who play their matches in Stadio Marc'Antonio Bentegodi. The club was formed in 1929, and the club's formal debut in an official league was on 8 November 1931. Before that time they played several amateur tournaments. Chievo disbanded in 1936, however, due to economic woes but returned to play in 1948 after World War II

The club has won the Serie B and Serie C1 once.

This list details the club's achievements in major competitions, and the top scorers for each season. Top scorers in bold were also the top scorers in the Italian league that season. Records of local or regional competitions are not included due to them being considered of less importance.

== Key ==
- P = Played
- W = Games won
- D = Games drawn
- L = Games lost
- GF = Goals for
- GA = Goals against
- Pts = Points
- Pos = Final position
- Serie A = 1st Tier in Italian League
- Serie B = 2nd Tier in Italian League
- Serie C = 3rd Tier in Italian League
- Prima Categoria = 1st Tier until 1922
- Promozione = 2nd Tier until 1922
- Prima Divisione = 1st Tier until 1926
- Prima Divisione = 2nd Tier (1926–1929)
- Seconda Divisione = 2nd Tier until 1926
- Seconda Divisione = 3rd Tier (1926–1929)
- Divisione Nazionale = 1st Tier (1926–1929)
- F = Final
- SF = Semi-finals
- QF = Quarter-finals
- R16 = Last 16
- R32 = Last 32
- QR1 = First Qualifying Round
- QR2 = Second Qualifying Round
- QR3 = Third Qualifying Round
- PO = Play-Offs
- 1R = Round 1
- 2R = Round 2
- 3R = Round 3
- GS = Group Stage
- 2GS = Second Group Stage
- EC = European Cup (1955–1992)
- UCL = UEFA Champions League (1993–present)
- CWC = UEFA Cup Winners' Cup (1960–1999)
- UC = UEFA Cup (1971–2008)
- UEL = UEFA Europa League (2009–present)
- USC = UEFA Super Cup
- INT = Intercontinental Cup (1960–2004)
- WC = FIFA Club World Cup (2005–present)

**Champions**	Runners-up	Promoted	Relegated	1st Tier	2nd Tier	3rd Tier	4th Tier	5th Tier	6th Tier	7th Tier

== Seasons ==
Results of league and cup competitions by season
Season	Division	P	W	D	L	GF	GA	Pts	Pos	Coppa Italia	Supercoppa Italiana	Cup	Result	Name(s)	Goals
Season	League									Coppa Italia	Supercoppa Italiana	UEFA - FIFA		Top goalscorer(s)	
1931–32	Seconda Cat. Veronese ULIC A (5)	-	-	-	-	-	-	-	3rd					n/a	
1932–33	Seconda Cat. Veronese ULIC A (5)	-	-	-	-	-	-	-	1st					n/a	
1933–34	Seconda Cat. Veronese ULIC A (5)	-	-	-	-	-	-	-	3rd					n/a	
1934–35	Seconda Cat. Veronese ULIC A (5)	-	-	-	-	-	-	-	-					n/a	
1935–36	Seconda Cat. Veronese ULIC A (5)	-	-	-	-	-	-	-	-					n/a	
1936–37	Disbanded	-	-	-	-	-	-	-	-					n/a	
1937–38	Disbanded	-	-	-	-	-	-	-	-					n/a	
1938–39	Disbanded	-	-	-	-	-	-	-	-					n/a	
1940–41	Disbanded	-	-	-	-	-	-	-	-					n/a	
1941–42	Disbanded	-	-	-	-	-	-	-	-					n/a	
1942–43	Disbanded	-	-	-	-	-	-	-	-					n/a	
1943–44	Disbanded	-	-	-	-	-	-	-	-					n/a	
1944–45	Disbanded	-	-	-	-	-	-	-	-					n/a	
1945–46	Disbanded	-	-	-	-	-	-	-	-					n/a	
1946–47	Disbanded	-	-	-	-	-	-	-	-					n/a	
1947–48	Disbanded	-	-	-	-	-	-	-	-					n/a	
1948–49	Seconda Divisione Veneto B (7)	-	-	-	-	-	-	-	3rd					n/a	
1949–50	Seconda Divisione Veneto I (7)	-	-	-	-	-	-	-	5th					n/a	
1950–51	Seconda Divisione Veneto A (7)	-	-	-	-	-	-	-	1st					n/a	
1951–52	Prima Divisione Veneto A (6)	-	-	-	-	-	-	-	15th					n/a	
1952–53	Prima Divisione Veneto A (6)	-	-	-	-	-	-	-	12th					n/a	
1953–54	Prima Divisione Veneto A (6)	-	-	-	-	-	-	-	6th					n/a	
1954–55	Prima Divisione Veneto A (6)	-	-	-	-	-	-	-	7th					n/a	
1955–56	Prima Divisione Veneto A (6)	-	-	-	-	-	-	-	4th					n/a	
1956–57	Prima Divisione Veneto A (6)	-	-	-	-	-	-	-	4th					n/a	
1957–58	Prima Divisione Veneto A (6)	-	-	-	-	-	-	-	7th					n/a	
1958–59	Prima Divisione Veneto A (6)	-	-	-	-	-	-	-	3rd					n/a	
1959–60	Seconda Categoria Veneto A (6)	-	-	-	-	-	-	-	9th					n/a	
1960–61	Prima Categoria Veneto A (5)	26	11	3	12	41	47	25	9th					n/a	
1961–62	Prima Categoria Veneto A (5)	30	-	-	-	-	-	28	8th					n/a	
1962–63	Prima Categoria Veneto B (5)	30	6	8	16	33	58	20	15th					n/a	
1963–64	Seconda Categoria Veneto A (6)	-	-	-	-	-	-	-	4th					n/a	
1964–65	Seconda Categoria Veneto A (6)	-	-	-	-	-	-	-	1st					n/a	
1965–66	Prima Categoria Veneto A (5)	30	8	13	9	34	32	29	11th					n/a	
1966–67	Prima Categoria Veneto A (5)	30	6	8	16	28	46	20	15th					n/a	
1967–68	Seconda Categoria Veneto A (6)	-	-	-	-	-	-	-	1st					n/a	
1968–69	Seconda Categoria Veneto A (6)	-	-	-	-	-	-	-	1st					n/a	
1969–70	Prima Categoria Veneto A (5)	30	8	13	9	42	44	29	8th					n/a	
1970–71	Promozione Veneto A (5)	30	9	10	11	28	33	28	9th					n/a	
1971–72	Promozione Veneto A (5)	30	12	12	6	35	20	36	5th					n/a	
1972–73	Promozione Veneto A (5)	30	-	-	-	-	-	29	11th					n/a	
1973–74	Promozione Veneto A (5)	30	-	-	-	-	-	30	11th					n/a	
1974–75	Promozione Veneto A (5)	30	-	-	-	-	-	41	1st					n/a	
1975–76	Serie D Girone C (5)	34	11	10	13	36	34	32	10th					n/a	
1976–77	Serie D Girone C (5)	34	11	8	15	27	35	30	15th					n/a	
1977–78	Serie D Girone B (5)	34	11	13	10	44	39	35	8th					n/a	
1978–79	Serie D Girone B (5)	34	9	14	11	37	49	32	11th					n/a	
1979–80	Serie D Girone C (5)	34	9	12	13	21	33	30	13th					n/a	
1980–81	Serie D Girone C (5)	34	10	11	13	33	36	31	11th					n/a	
1981–82	Campionato Interregionale Girone B (5)	30	9	11	10	27	31	29	8th					Alberto Vanoni	7
1982–83	Campionato Interregionale Girone D (5)	30	9	9	12	29	31	27	12th					Fausto Nosè	8
1983–84	Campionato Interregionale Girone D (5)	30	10	10	10	22	20	30	9th					Paolo Galli	7
1984–85	Campionato Interregionale Girone C (5)	30	9	14	7	40	29	32	7th					Giovanni Sartori	11
1985–86	Campionato Interregionale Girone C (5)	30	18	8	4	44	14	44	1st					Giovanni Sartori	17
1986–87	Serie C2 Girone B (4)	34	11	16	7	24	23	38	4th					Flavio Fiorio	7
1987–88	Serie C2 Girone B (4)	34	15	13	6	36	22	43	4th					Flavio Fiorio	13
1988–89	Serie C2 Girone B (4)	34	18	12	4	41	15	48	1st					Flavio Fiorio	15
1989–90	Serie C1 Girone A (3)	34	10	15	9	37	31	35	6th					Flavio Fiorio	12
1990–91	Serie C1 Girone A (3)	34	8	15	11	23	29	31	14th					Franco Lerda	8
1991–92	Serie C1 Girone A (3)	34	8	18	8	32	35	34	7th					Riccardo Gori	13
1992–93	Serie C1 Girone A (3)	32	12	10	10	36	34	34	7th					Riccardo Gori	8
1993–94	Serie C1 Girone A (3)	34	19	11	4	46	23	68	1st					Riccardo Gori	12
1994–95	Serie B (2)	38	10	14	14	35	38	44	13th	2R				Michele Cossato	10
1995–96	Serie B (2)	38	9	20	9	37	30	47	14th	2R				Michele Cossato	8
1996–97	Serie B (2)	38	12	18	8	44	40	54	7th	2R				Raffaele Cerbone	20
1997–98	Serie B (2)	38	12	14	12	43	43	50	10th	1R				Raffaele Cerbone	12
1998–99	Serie B (2)	38	11	15	12	37	40	48	11th	R32				Ciro De Cesare	10
1999–2000	Serie B (2)	38	11	14	13	48	53	47	15th	GS				Massimo Marazzina	17
2000–01	Serie B (2)	38	19	13	6	54	34	70	3rd	GS				Bernardo Corradi	13
2001–02	Serie A (1)	34	14	12	8	57	52	54	5th	GS				Massimo Marazzina	13
2002–03	Serie A (1)	34	16	7	11	51	39	55	7th	QF		UC	1R	Federico Cossato	9
2003–04	Serie A (1)	34	11	11	12	36	37	44	9th	R16				Federico Cossato	6
2004–05	Serie A (1)	38	11	10	17	32	49	43	15th	2R				Sergio Pellissier	7
2005–06	Serie A (1)	38	13	15	10	54	49	54	4th	3R				Sergio Pellissier	13
2006–07	Serie A (1)	38	9	12	17	38	48	39	18th	QF		CL; UC	QR3; 1R	Sergio Pellissier	9
2007–08	Serie B (2)	42	24	13	5	77	43	85	1st	1R				Sergio Pellissier	22
2008–09	Serie A (1)	38	8	14	16	35	49	38	16th	3R				Sergio Pellissier	14
2009–10	Serie A (1)	38	12	8	18	37	42	44	14th	R16				Sergio Pellissier	12
2010–11	Serie A (1)	38	11	13	14	38	40	46	11th	R16				Sergio Pellissier	11
2011–12	Serie A (1)	38	12	13	13	35	45	49	10th	QF				Sergio Pellissier	8
2012–13	Serie A (1)	38	12	9	17	37	52	45	12th	4R				Cyril Théréau	13
2013–14	Serie A (1)	38	10	6	22	34	54	36	16th	R16				Alberto Paloschi	15
2014–15	Serie A (1)	38	10	13	15	28	41	43	14th	3R				Alberto Paloschi	9
2015–16	Serie A (1)	38	13	11	14	43	45	50	9th	3R				Alberto Paloschi	8
2016–17	Serie A (1)	38	12	7	19	43	61	43	14th	R16				Roberto Inglese	12
2017–18	Serie A (1)	38	10	10	18	36	59	40	13th	4R				Roberto Inglese	13
2018–19	Serie A (1)	38	2	14	22	25	75	17	20th	4R				Mariusz Stępiński	6
2019–20	Serie B (2)	38	14	14	10	48	38	56	6th	3R				Filip Đorđević	9
