= Crociati Parma =

Crociati Parma may refer to either of the following Italian sports clubs:

- Crociati Noceto, known as "Crociati Parma" until 2009, a football club based in Noceto
- Crociati Parma Rugby FC, today called "Crociati Parma" by English-language media, a rugby union club formed in 2010 and based in Parma
