= USD Olginatese =

Italian football club

Olginatese
- Full name: Unione Sportiva Dilettantistica Brianza Olginatese
- Founded: 1968
- Ground: Stadio Comunale, Olginate, Italy
- Capacity: 1,050
- Chairman: Ermanno Gilardi; Flavio Redaelli (honorary president)
- Manager: Nicolò Conca
- League: Eccellenza Lombardia
- 2021–22: Serie D/B, 18th (relegated)
Home colours	Away colours

Unione Sportiva Dilettantistica Brianza Olginatese is an Italian association football club located in Olginate, Lombardy. It currently plays in Eccellenza.

== History ==
The original company was founded in 1922 and for five years only in the local leagues dispute. During the Fascist period participates in various regional and provincial championships, to remain inactive during the war. And reconstitution in 1945 sharpened the FIGC. After two years in Prima Divisione Lombardy, is promoted to Serie C, where it remains only in the 1947–1948 season.

In 1952, the company gives up and remains inactive until 1968, when it is re-established themselves as participants in youth leagues. In 1972, forms a team that plays in the Terza Categoria. From 1981 it began a slow but steady rise of the minor leagues, until it wins Eccellenza Lombardy Girone B in 2001. From the 2001–02 it participates in Serie D, to achieve different finishes of medium ranking: best result obtained so far are the playoffs in the 2004–2005 and 2010–11 season.

== Colors and badge ==
Its colors are white and black.

== Chronology ==
- 1922 – Birth of Unione Sportiva (en: Sports Union) Olginatese.
- 1922–27 – Sport activity in the local area.
- 1927 – The U.S. Olginatese is affiliated to the U.L.I.C. Committee "Brianteo" of Monza and enrolled in the championship Prima Categoria (age limit 21 years old not yet reached).
- 1927–28 – 4th in group A of Prima Categoria U.L.I.C. Monza Committee.
- 1928– The championships run by the U.L.I.C. Committee of Como are expanded with the entry of newly formed companies. The U.S. Olginatese does not continue with Monza and enrolled in Como, always in Prima Categoria.
- 1928–29 – 2nd in group B of Prima Categoria U.L.I.C. Como.
- 1929 – Bonds to Opera Nazionale Dopolavoro (O.N.D.) and changed its name to Gruppo Sportivo (en: Sports Group) Olginate O.N.D. Back to the U.L.I.C. Committee Monza.
- 1929–30 – 3rd in group D of Prima Categoria U.L.I.C. Monza.
- 1930 – It is affiliated to the newly constituted U.L.I.C. Committee Lecco but does not participate in the championship 1930–31.
- 1931–32 -?th in group A of Prima Categoria U.L.I.C. Lecco. Changed its name to U.S. Olginatese.
- 1932–33 -?th in group B of Seconda Categoria U.L.I.C. Lecco.
- 1933–34 -?th in group B of Seconda Categoria U.L.I.C. Lecco.
- 1934–36 – Missing data.
- 1936–37 – ?th in group B of Seconda Categoria Propaganda Section of Lecco.
- 1937–38 -?
- 1938 – It is affiliated to FIGC with the denomination U.S. Olginatese and enrolled in the Seconda Divisione Lombardy.
- 1938–39 – 1st in group B of Seconda Divisione Lombardy, go to the semifinals. In the semi-final encounters Pro Palazzolo but not enough to beat the first two (2–1 and 2–3 outside) and on 28 May in Bergamo wins 2–1. In the final, was beaten by Luino with a double 1–2. Promoted to Prima Divisione.
- 1939–40 – 4th in group B Prima Divisione Lombardy.
- 1940–41 – 7th in group F of Prima Divisione Lombardy.
- 1941–45 – Inactive for war reasons.
- 1945 – Reconstituted always U.S. Olginatese denomination.
- 1945–46 – 5th in group F of Prima Divisione Lombardy.
- 1946–47 – Winner of group ?. 4th in group D (final rounds) of Prima Divisione Lombardy. Admitted to Serie C for only later expansion of new teams.
- 1947–48 – 11th in group E of Serie C. Relegated to Promozione.
- 1948–49 – 10th in group C of Promozione.
- 1949–50 – 17th in group C of Promozione. Relegated to the Prima Divisione Lombardy.
- 1950–51 – 5th in group D of Prima Divisione Lombardy.
- 1951–52 – 16th in group D of Prima Divisione Lombardy. Relegated to Seconda Divisione Lombardy.
- 1952 – Resignation letter to the Regional Lombardy Committee dated 18 September.
- 1952 to 1968 – Inactive
- 1968 – Born again in this year, playing probably only the youth championships organized by Local Committee of Lecco.
- 1972 – It is affiliated to the FIGC joining the Championship Terza Categoria run by Provincial Committee of Como.
- 1972–73 – 4th in group B Terza Categoria Committee of Como.
- 1973–74 – 4th in group B Terza Categoria Committee of Como.
- 1974–75 – 6th in group A Terza Categoria Committee of Como.
- 1975–76 – 4th in group A Terza Categoria Committee of Como.
- 1976–77 – 10th in group A Terza Categoria Committee of Como.
- 1977–78 – 4th in group B Terza Categoria Committee of Como.
- 1978–79 – 2nd in group B Terza Categoria Committee of Como. Admitted to Seconda Categoria to fill up resignations.
- 1979–80 – 15th in group G Seconda Categoria Lombardy. Relegated to Terza Categoria.
- 1980–81 – 8th in group A Terza Categoria Committee of Como.
- 1981– Go for the Under-21 Championship and deploy a team, "pure" with no players out of age, same level as Terza Categoria.
- 1981–82 – 1st in group A Terza Categoria Committee of Como. Promoted to Seconda Categoria.
- 1982–83 – 13th in group G of Seconda Categoria Lombardy.
- 1983–84 – 2nd in group G of Seconda Categoria Lombardy.
- 1984–85 – 11th in group H of Seconda Categoria Lombardy. Save by the best head-to-head in the ranking divorced because in a 4 teams group with 24 points the relegated is Albiatese.
- 1985–86 – 9th in group H of Seconda Categoria Lombardy.
- 1986–87 – 6th in group H of Seconda Categoria Lombardy.
- 1987–88 – 2nd in group H of Seconda Categoria Lombardy. Admitted to Prima Categoria by means of a classification on points compiled by the Regional Committee Lombardy.
- 1988–89 – 7th in group E of Prima Categoria Lombardy.
- 1989–90 – 8th in group E of Prima Categoria Lombardy.
- 1990–91 – 1st in group E of Prima Categoria Lombardy. Promoted in Promozione.
- 1991–92 – 7th in group B of Promozione Lombardy.
- 1992–93 – 5th in group B of Promozione Lombardy.
- 1993–94 – 12th in group B of Promozione Lombardy.
- 1994–95 – 1st in group B of Promozione Lombardy. Promoted to Eccellenza.
- 1995–96 – 2nd in group A of Eccellenza Lombardy, is the play-off between the runners-up. Lose the play-offs beat by Imperia (1–2 at home and 0–3 outside).
- 1996–97 – 3rd in group A of Eccellenza Lombardy.
- 1997–98 – 11th in group A of Eccellenza Lombardy.
- 1998–99 – 5th in group A Eccellenza Lombardy.
- 1999–00 – 4th in group B Eccellenza Lombardy.
- 2000–01 – 1st in group B of Eccellenza Lombardy. Promoted to Serie D.
- 2001–02 – 11th in group B of Serie D
- 2002–03 – 13th in group B of Serie D, qualifies to play-out. Saved in the play-out beating Verbania (1–2 outside and 3–0 at home).
- 2003–04 – 7th in group B of Serie D.
- 2004–05 – 4th in group B OF Serie D, qualifies to play-offs. Loses the first round of play-off with Lecco (0–2 at home and 0–3 outside).
- 2005–06 – 7th in group B of Serie D.
- 2006–07 – 8th in group B of Serie D.
- 2007–08 – 12th in group B of Serie D.
- 2008–09 – 12th in group B of Serie D.
- 2009–10 – 11th in group B of Serie D.
- 2010–11 – 5th in group B of Serie D. Loses first round of play-off at Voghera (1–2 outside).
- 2011–12 – 3rd in group B of Serie D.
