= Michele Cossato =

Italian footballer

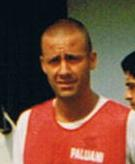

Personal information
- Date of birth: 28 April 1970 (age 56)
- Place of birth: Milan, Italy
- Height: 1.86 m (6 ft 1 in)
- Position: Striker

Youth career
- –1986: Chievo

Senior career*
Years	Team	Apps	(Gls)
1986–1997	Chievo	189	(41)
1987–1988	→ Valdagno(loan)	19	(4)
1990	→ Oltrepò (loan)	5	(0)
1990–1991	→ Perugia (loan)	3	(0)
1997–1998	Venezia	34	(11)
1998–2000	Atalanta	24	(2)
2000–2003	Verona	51	(6)
2003–2004	Fiorentina	6	(0)
2004	Cittadella	10	(0)
2004–2006	Montichiari	52	(17)
2006–2008	Domegliara	33	(10)

International career
2008	Padania	5	(3)
- * Club domestic league appearances and goals

Michele Cossato (born 28 April 1970 in Milan) is an Italian former professional footballer who last played as a striker for Domegliara, a team that was competing in Serie D of the Italian football league system. He is the brother of fellow former footballer Federico Cossato.

His first achievements in football took place in Verona, where he grew up. He played for both of the major Veronese teams Chievo Verona and Hellas Verona.

== Career ==
=== The early years ===
Michele Cossato's long football career began in the 1986–87 football season, when, although he was still very young, he joined A.C. ChievoVerona. During that year the team moved down to Serie C2. He was then sold to Valdagno, to get experience in playing for the Interregional Championship (the current Serie D). With the team of the Province of Vicenza he scored 4 goals in 19 matches. In the 1988–1989 Championship he returned to Chievo, and was part of the team's most triumphant season (which resulted in their promotion to Serie C1). In the summer of 1990 he was lent to Oltrepò and then to A.C. Perugia, in Serie C1. In the 8 matches he played, no goals were scored. In the season 1991–1992 the Chievo decided to keep the player, whose season has unfortunately not been memorable: in fact, he played 3 matches without scoring a goal.

=== Chievo ===
The 1992–93 Serie C1 enshrines the mature of Cossato, who is noted by scoring 5 goals in 25 matches. The following season, with its 8 goals in 28 matches, gives a fundamental contribution to the promotion of Chievo in Serie B. In the three years as a cadet played for Chievo, he confirmed himself as a prolific striker (28 goals scored in 104 matches). Become a key player for the team, he meant salvation for his team in 1994 and in 1995 as well. In the 1996–1997 season, the one in which Chievo almost got a promotion in Serie A, he established along with Raffaele Cerbone one of several pairs of the League (32 total goals). At the end of the season he left Chievo, together with the trainer Malesani, another big maker of the then excellent championship team.

=== Promotion and struggles ===
After the long and successful period with Chievo, Cossato went to A.C. Venezia, which strongly fought to obtain the promotion in Serie A. The promotion is very positive for both the player and his team. The worship of the success of the so-called Lagoon (reference to Venice) is largely attributable to the couple of attack formed by Schwoch (17 goals) and Cossato (11 goals). In the season 1998–1999 he had the opportunity to play in Serie A, but being not included in the plans of the team he didn't make its debut in the championship. In October he was signed by Atalanta Bergamasca Calcio. In his period in Bergamo, Cossato, due to several physical problems, wasn't able to express himself at best and to meet the high expectations placed on him.

=== Hellas Verona ===
During the month of January 2000 he went back to Verona, this time to play with the team of Hellas. On 6 February 2000 he made his debut in Serie A (playing Verona – Fiorentina, ended with a 2–2). The year ended with no goals scored by Cossato. The precarious physical condition allowed him to play only a few times in season 2000–2001 (14 matches, 2 goals). Indeed, on June 24, 2001, during the play-off return to escape relegation in Serie B between Reggina and Hellas Verona, he put off a goal which meant salvation for the team. This made him extremely popular among supporters of Verona. Cossato has been nicknamed Super Mike and in his honor several gadgets have been created. In the first Derby in Serie A with Chievo some physical problems continued to prevent him by a continuous use (7 presences, 1 goal). At the end of the season, Hellas retroceded in the Serie B. In his last season with the team, the attacker scored 3 goals in 22 league appearances.

=== Fiorentina, Cittadella and recovery in Montichiari (2003–2006) ===
After the period with the Verona, Cossato was bought by ACF Fiorentina in September 2003. The trainer saw him as the expert attacker who could give a valuable contribution for the immediate return of the team in Serie A. However, the experience of Cossato with the team of Florence is anything but memorable. Between the beginning of the championship in January he played only a few minutes and didn't score any goal. Thus, with the beginning of 2004, he moved to Cittadella, in Serie C1. Even with the Veneto team he failed to make better (10 presences, no goals). In 2004, the player signed the offer of Montichiari, playing in Serie C2. The first season with Lombard team was very positive. The player, in fact, went back to his goal continuity (15 goals in 27 presences) becoming a player of primary importance for his team. The championship 2005–2006 was Cossato's last among professionals. He scored 2 goals.

=== Domegliara (2006–2008) ===
In the summer of 2006 he accepted the proposal by Claudio Paiola, ambitious president of Domegliara, training veronese of Valpolicella. He had therefore the possibility of closing his career close to home and at the same time, to make a good contribution in terms of experience to his new team, which had as its objective the jump in Serie D. In 2007, the Domegliara won the championship of Excellence gaining promotion. Cossato fell 16 times in two marking networks. He remained in the next season of Serie D player on the staff headed by Paolo Vanoli.

In the summer of 2008 was reached by his brother Federico, but the permanence of both lasted only a few months and in December received the consensual termination of the contract.

=== Selection Padana ===
At the beginning of June 2008, Cossato advocated to the ideals Po Valley and announced its aggregation row in the selection of Padania football team to tackle the 2008 edition of Viva World Cup, World Cup between national NF-Board and not recognised by FIFA, along with his brother Federico.
