= Riccardo Secondo =

Italian footballer

Personal information
- Date of birth: 9 September 1995 (age 31)
- Place of birth: Vercelli, Italy
- Height: 1.85 m (6 ft 1 in)
- Position: Midfielder

Team information
- Current team: Biellese

Youth career
- –2014: Pro Vercelli

Senior career*
Years	Team	Apps	(Gls)
2013–2022	Pro Vercelli	4	(0)
2015–2016	→ Pontedera (loan)	2	(0)
2016–2017	→ Siena (loan)	1	(0)
2017–2018	→ Cuneo (loan)	11	(0)
2018–2020	→ Gozzano (loan)	33	(2)
2022–	Biellese	0	(0)
- * Club domestic league appearances and goals as of 24 April 2022

Riccardo Secondo (born 9 September 1995) is an Italian footballer who plays as a midfielder for Eccellenza club Biellese.

== Club career ==
He made his Serie B debut for Pro Vercelli on 18 May 2013 in a game against Cesena.

On 2 August 2018, he left Pro Vercelli for Gozzano in a temporary deal along with Lorenzo Grossi. He remained in the "rossobù" team for the 2019–20 season too.
