= Gaetano Carrieri =

Italian footballer

Personal information
- Date of birth: 10 March 1988 (age 38)
- Place of birth: Taranto, Italy
- Height: 1.90 m (6 ft 3 in)
- Position: Centre-back

Team information
- Current team: Grottammare

Senior career*
Years	Team	Apps	(Gls)
2005–2006	Grottaglie	1	(0)
2006–2007	Rossanese	13	(0)
2007–2008	Pomigliano	26	(3)
2008–2010	Manfredonia	34	(1)
2010–2011	Torino	1	(0)
2011	→ Nocerina (loan)	3	(0)
2011–2013	Varese	0	(0)
2013–2015	Nuova Cosenza	14	(0)
2015	Rende	7	(0)
2015–2016	Fermana	8	(0)
2016–2017	Vultur Rionero	26	(0)
2017–2018	AZ Picerno	25	(1)
2018	Olympia Agnonese	10	(0)
2019	Gravina	7	(0)
2019–2020	Grumentum	21	(0)
2020–2021	Sangiustese		
2021	Sambuceto		
2021–2022	Amatrice		
2022–	Grottammare		
- * Club domestic league appearances and goals as of 20:04, 13 November 2023 (UTC)

Gaetano Carrieri (born 10 March 1988) is an Italian footballer who plays for Grottammare.

== Biography ==
Born in Taranto, Apulia, Carrieri started his senior career at an amateur level. In 2008, Carrieri was signed by his first fully professional club Livorno and farmed to Manfredonia in co-ownership deal, which Livorno gave up the 50% registration rights in June 2009. Carrieri played 23 games in his second season in the fourth division. On 10 August 2010, he was signed by Italian Serie B club Torino as a free agent in a 3-year contract. He only played once, on 4 September 2010 against F.C. Crotone. On 31 January 2011, Carrieri left for the third division club Nocerina on a temporary deal. On 17 June 2011 Carrieri was a piece-weight to sign Osarimen Ebagua in co-ownership deal. Half of Carrieri's "card" was valued €200,000, and half of Ebagua's €1.4 million. In June 2012 Torino gave up the remain 50% registration rights to Varese and Varese also bought back Ebagua. Torino also signed Riccardo Fiamozzi from Varese as compensation in the same month.

In the 2012–13 Serie B season, Carrieri changed his shirt number from 36 to 6, and finally made his club debut in a competitive game, on 13 August 2012 the first round of the cup.
