= ASD Real Normanna =

Italian association football club

Real Normanna
- Full name: Associazione Sportiva Dilettantistica; Real Normanna
- Founded: 1925
- Ground: Stadio Augusto Bisceglia, Aversa, Italy
- Capacity: 2,555
- Chairman: Vincenzo Del Villano & Domenico Diana
- Manager: Massimo Carnevale
- League: Serie D Group H
- 2024–25: Eccellenza Campania A, 2nd (promoted)
Home colours	Away colours

A.S.D. Real Normanna is an Italian association football club located in Aversa, Campania. Currently it plays in Serie D.

== History ==
The club was founded in 1925.

In the 2007–08 Serie D season, the team won direct promotion to Lega Pro Seconda Divisione after finishing first in Girone H. They also won the Scudetto Dilettanti (the overall Serie D championship) by winning the end-of-year tournament played amongst the nine division winners. Aversa Normanna were relegated in the 2012–13 season, but were readmitted to fill a vacancy. Something similar happened the following season: after being defeated by Tuttocuoio in the relegation playoffs, Aversa Normanna was successively allowed a spot in the 2014–15 Lega Pro season (the inaugural one as a unified third tier) to fill one of four vacancies in the league.

In 2023, the team was acquired by Emanuele Filiberto of Savoy through the company Casa Reale Holding S.p.A., already owner of U.S. Savoia 1908 and SSD Portici 1906. The club was successively retired from the Eccellenza league during the season, and restarted as Real Normanna under a new ownership, which led Real Normanna to promotion to Serie D after winning the national playoffs.

== Colors and badge ==
The team's colour is all-dark red.

== Honours ==
- Serie D:
  - Winners 1: 2007–08
- Coppa Italia Serie D:
  - Winners 1: 2006–07
