= AS Cosenza Calcio =

Italian football club

Cosenza
- 2003–05 Logo
- Full name: A.S. Cosenza Calcio
- Founded: 2003 (as A.S. Cosenza F.C.)
- Dissolved: 2007 (as A.S. Cosenza Calcio)
- Ground: Stadio San Vito, Cosenza

A.S. Cosenza Calcio was an Italian football club based in Cosenza, Calabria. The club was an illegitimate phoenix club of Cosenza Calcio 1914 S.p.A., by the relocation of a local club from Castrovillari to Cosenza in 2003 (with a new team was refound in Castrovillari as U.S. Castrovillari Calcio). However, Cosenza 1914 was re-admitted to 2004–05 Serie D, making that season have two teams from Cosenza in the fifth tier. In 2005 the old Cosenza folded. However, in 2007 A.S. Cosenza Calcio (P.I. 02688160783) also folded, with another team from Rende (Rende Calcio) was relocated to Cosenza as Fortitudo Cosenza (P.I. 01960520789). S.S. Rende was found in the same year to replace Rende Calcio. In total A.S. Cosenza Calcio spent 4 seasons in Serie D.

== History ==
Following the Cosenza Calcio 1914 S.p.A.'s non-admission to 2003–04 Serie C1. A football team was relocated from Castrovillari, in the Province of Cosenza, to Cosenza as A.S. Cosenza Football Club, by the support of Cosenza Mayor Eva Catizone and other investors.

Cosenza F.C. finished as the 7th in 2003–04 Serie D. In 2004 old Cosenza was also admitted to Serie D, but finally withdrew from football activities in 2005.

The president of Rende Calcio, Franco Ippolito Chiappetta was about to buy Cosenza F.C. in January 2005 from Gaetano Intrieri; A.S. Cosenza F.C. was also incorporated as Fortitudo Cosenza S.S.D. a.r.l. (P.I. 02688160783) that year. although the name change was not submit to Italian Football Federation (from Associazione Sportiva Dilettantistica to Società Sportive Dilettantistiche a Responsabilità Limitata).

A.S. Cosenza F.C. was finally renamed to A.S. Cosenza Calcio S.p.A. in July 2005.

However, the club missed promotion once again in 2006 and 2007, being defeated by Siracusa in the promotion playoffs both times.

In 2007 A.S. Cosenza Calcio also folded. Rende Calcio, under new president Damiano Paletta, relocated the club to Cosenza to become the new Cosenza team: Fortitudo Cosenza in the same year. (P.I. 01960520789)

== Notable former players ==
Players with international caps. Players in bold won the caps during his career with Cosenza

- (Italy) Gianluigi Lentini

== Shirt sponsors and manufacturers ==
Period	Kit manufacturer	Shirt sponsor
2004-2005	Sport Point	
2005-2006	Errea	

== Club presidents ==
- (Italy) Eva Catizone
- (Italy) Gaetano Intrieri
