= Quarto, Campania =

Quarto
- Comune
- Comune di Quarto
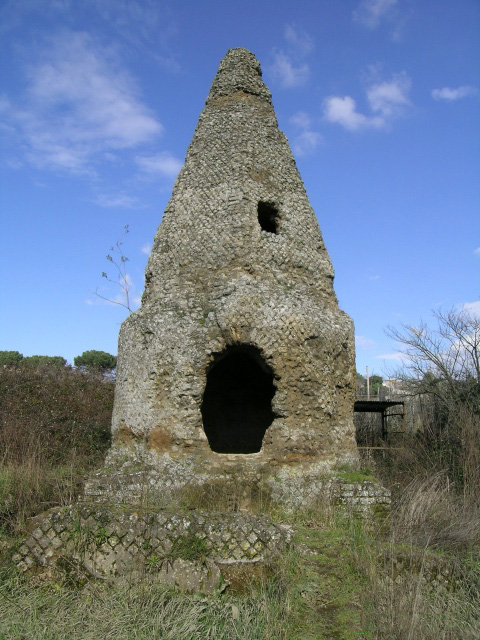

- Location within Italy Location within Campania
- Coordinates: 40°52′40″N 14°8′25″E
- Country: Italy
- Region: Campania
- Metropolitan city: Naples (NA)

Government
  - Mayor: Antonio Sabino

Area
  - Total: 14.16 km^{2} (5.47 sq mi)
- Elevation: 142 m (466 ft)

Population (1 January 2017)
  - Total: 41,069
  - Density: 2,900/km^{2} (7,512/sq mi)
- Demonym: Quartesi
- Time zone: UTC+1 (CET)
  - Summer (DST): UTC+2 (CEST)
- Postal code: 80010
- Dialing code: 081
- Patron saint: Santa Maria
- Saint day: 12 September
- Website: Official website

Quarto is a comune (municipality) in the Metropolitan City of Naples in the Italian region Campania, located about 11 km (6.8 mi) northwest of Naples.

Quarto borders the following municipalities: Giugliano in Campania, Marano di Napoli, Naples, Pozzuoli, Villaricca. The local football club for the comune is A.S.D. Quarto.
