= ASD Celano Calcio =

Italian football club

Celano
- Full name: Celano Calcio; Associazione Sportiva Dilettantistica
- Nicknames: Marsicani, Biancoazzurri (white-blues)
- Founded: 1974
- Ground: Stadio Fabio Piccone, Celano, Italy
- Capacity: 3,200
- Chairman: Mario Moscarella
- Manager: Fabio Iodice
- League: Eccellenza Abruzzo
- 2025-26: Eccellenza Abruzzo, 7th
Home colours	Away colours

ASD Celano Calcio (known as Celano F.C. Olimpia until the 2010–11 season and Celano F.C. Marsica until the 2018–19 season) is an Italian association football from Celano, Abruzzo. Currently they play in Eccellenza Abruzzo.

== History ==
The club was founded in 1974 as Celano Football Club Olimpia, registering for Terza Categoria in 1978 following the demise of the previous Celanesi team, Cliternum.

In the 2005–06 Serie D, Celano finished second in their group and won their regional playoffs beating Tolentino 1–0. In the national playoffs, where all nine winners of the regional playoffs were placed into three groups of three teams, they made it to the final being defeated 5–2 by Monopoli. Due to teams being excluded from 2006–07 Serie C2, Celano were administratively promoted, finishing 14th where they beat Pro Vasto in the relegation playoffs to keep their place in Serie C2. They had previously spent 4 seasons in Serie C2 between 1987–88 and 1990–91.

=== Relegation from Lega Pro Seconda Divisione to Promozione ===
In the 2012–13 season, they played in Serie D after finishing bottom of their group the previous season. In 2014–15, Celano finished bottom again and were relegated to Eccellenza Abruzzo. The following season, Celano suffered another relegation to Promozione and a new company was founded in place of the old one.

=== Merger with Pro Celano and return to Promozione ===
At the end of the 2017–18 Promozione season, Celano F.C. Marsica merged with Prima Categoria side, Pro Celano, to create a new company called ASD Celano Calcio. This side played in Prima Categoria Abruzzo Girone A for the 2018–19 season, winning promotion at the end of the season via the playoffs beating New Club Villa Mattoni 6–5 on penalties after drawing 4–4 on aggregate (2–2, 2–2). They will therefore play in Promozione Abruzzo in 2019–20.

=== Promotion from Promozione ===
In the 2022-23 season, Celano Calcio finished joint top with San Benedetto Venere. A playoff was held between the two teams to determine who would finish as league champions. Celano won 2-1 after extra time securing a return to Eccellenza for the first time in 7 years.
