= ASD Gragnano Calcio =

Italian football club

Gragnano
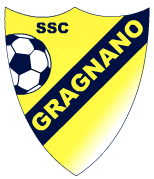
- Full name: Società Sportiva Calcio Gragnano
- Nickname(s): i gialloblu (the yellow-blues)
- Founded: 1965
- Ground: Stadio Romeo Menti, Castellammare di Stabia, Italy
- Capacity: 10,400
- Chairman: (Italy) Sergio Cannavacciuolo
- Manager: (Italy) Antonio Foglia Manzillo
- League: Serie D/H
- 2017–18: 9th
Home colours	Away colours

Società Sportiva Calcio Gragnano is an Italian association football club based in Gragnano, Campania. The club was founded in 1965, and refounded in 1990. The official colours of Gragnano are yellow and blue, which has led to their nickname of gialloblu.

Gragnano achieved promotion by winning the play-offs of the Eccellenza 2006-07, meaning for next season the club began competing at Serie D level. After gaining promotion to Serie D, the club began groundsharing with Juve Stabia another club from the Province of Naples at the Stadio Romeo Menti, instead of playing at their Stadio San Michele in Gragnano.

== Honours ==
- Eccellenza Campania
  - Promoted: 2006–07
