= ASD FC Bassano Romano =

Italian football club

Bassano Romano
- Full name: Associazione Sportiva Dilettante; Football Club Bassano Romano
- Founded: 1962
- Ground: Stadio Comunale, Bassano Romano, Italy
- Capacity: 500
- Chairman: Paolo Tagliolini
- League: Terza Categoria/Viterbo Gir.A
- 2007–08: Serie D/G, 10 th
Home colours	Away colours

A.S.D. F.C. Bassano Romano is an Italian association football club located in Bassano Romano, Lazio. Having surrendered the title of Serie D, it currently plays in Terza Categoria, the lowest level of the Italian football. Its colors are red and blue.
