= ASD Quarto =

Italian football club

Quarto
- Full name: Associazione Sportiva Dilettante Quarto
- Nickname(s): –
- Founded: 1986
- Ground: Comunale, Quarto, Italy
- Capacity: 1,500
- Chairman: Francesco Baiano
- Manager: Ciro Amorosetti
- League: Serie D
- 2006–07: Eccellenza Campania – A, 4th
Home colours	Away colours

Associazione Sportiva Dilettante Quarto is an Italian association football club located in Quarto, Campania. The club was founded in 1986 and their official colours are white and blue.

== Promotion to Serie D ==
Recently Quarto achieved promotion by winning the play-offs of the Eccellenza 2006-07, meaning for next season the club will be competing at Serie D level for the first time in their history. Diego Sinagra also known as Diego Maradona Jr. was part of the squad which achieved promotion.

== Honours ==
- Eccellenza Campania
  - Promoted: 2006–07
- Promozione Campania
  - Champions: 2004–05
