= SSD Eurotezze =

Italian football club

Eurotezze
- Full name: Società Sportiva Dilettante; Eurotezze
- Founded: 2007
- Dissolved: 2009
- Ground: Stadio Comunale, Tezze sul Brenta, Italy
- 2008–09: Serie D/C, 2nd
Home colours	Away colours

Società Sportiva Dilettante Eurotezze was an Italian association football club located in Tezze sul Brenta, Veneto.

== History ==
The club was formed in 2007 after the merger of U.S.C.D. Eurocalcio Cassola and A.C. Tezze sul Brenta.

=== The dissolution ===
In the summer 2009 it did not join 2011-12 Serie D and as a result were excluded from Italian Football.

== Colors and badge ==
Its colors were blue and red.
