= FC Canavese =

Socker team from Italy

- Full name: Football Club Canavese Srl
- Founded: 2001
- Dissolved: 2011
- Ground: Stadio Franco Cerutti, San Giusto Canavese, Italy
- Capacity: 2,510
- 2010–11: Lega Pro Seconda Divisione A, 11th
Home colours	Away colours

Football Club Canavese was an Italian association football club located in San Giusto Canavese, Piedmont.

== History ==
Canavese was formed by the 2001 merger of the two clubs U. S. Sangiustese founded in 1946 and A. S. Volpiano founded in 1919.

It played five years in Serie D before earning promotion in 2006. In 2005 they made it to the second round of promotion playoffs before losing to Cirié in extra-time. The following year, Canavese won Girone A with 74 points, leading to a direct promotion to Lega Pro Seconda Divisione. Their first two seasons there were successful, just missing the promotion playoffs in 2007–08 and finishing in the top half of the league in 2008–09. However, their follow-up was less inspiring, finishing 13th in Girone A, avoiding the relegation playoffs by one point.

Canavese didn't join 2011–12 Lega Pro Seconda Divisione and excluded from all football.

== Colors and badge ==
Its colors are blue and garnet.
