= Cosenza Calcio 1914 =

Italian football club

Cosenza
- Full name: Cosenza Calcio 1914
- Founded: 1926
- Dissolved: 2005
- Ground: Stadio San Vito, Cosenza

Cosenza Calcio 1914 was a professional Italian football club based in Cosenza, Calabria.

It was founded as Cosenza Foot-Ball Club in 1926. The club was expelled from the professional leagues in 2003, only readmitted a year later in Serie D. In 2005 the club folded, ended its 91 years of history.

From 2003 to 2007 A.S. Cosenza Calcio claimed to be the successor, after it was relocated from a nearby town. Again in 2007, Fortitudo Cosenza was relocated from Rende as the new successor, and renamed Cosenza Calcio 1914 Srl in 2008. However, the spiritual successor folded again in 2011, while yet another new club Nuova Cosenza Calcio was founded using Article 52 of N.O.I.F. in the 2011–12 Serie D.

== From 1912 to 2005 ==
=== Cosenza Calcio 1914 SpA ===
==== Early times and Serie B ====
The club was founded in 1926 as Cosenza Foot-Ball Club (the year 1914 is a reference to the first historic match played in the town of Cosenza on 23 February 1914) and enjoyed a long time in the professional leagues, spending several years in the Serie B and launching several famous players. They also won the Anglo-Italian Cup in 1983. During the 1980s and the 1990s, the Calabrian side barely missed promotion to the Italian top flight several times, most notably in 1989, when they ended with the same points than fourth-placed Cremonese and Reggina, but being not admitted to the promotion playoff as having the worst results of the three in head-to-head matches. In 1991–92, Cosenza lost promotion again, with a final fifth place only two points behind of Udinese.

==== Serie D times ====
Following these highs, the club successively started experiencing hard times, being ultimately excluded in July 2003 by the federation due to financial issues, leaving Cosenza suddenly without a club.

In 2004, the franchise was however admitted back into Serie D following a judicial sentence, together the new A.S. Cosenza F.C.: this caused the city of Cosenza to have two "rival" clubs in the same division. This lasted only one year, as Cosenza 1914 finally folded.

=== Notable former players ===
International footballers of Cosenza Calcio 1914

- (Italy) Stefano Fiore
- (Italy) Gianluigi Lentini
- (Italy) Cristiano Lucarelli
- (Ivory Coast) Christian Manfredini
- (Ghana) Mark Edusei
- (Lithuania) Marius Stankevičius
- (Paraguay) Rubén Maldonado
- (Venezuela) Massimo Margiotta

=== Colors and badge ===
The team's official colours were red and blue.

== Honours ==
- Anglo-Italian Cup: 1 (1983)
- Serie C: 1 (1960–61)
- Serie C1: 2 (1987–88), (1997–98)
- Serie C2: 1 (1979–80)
- Serie D: 2 (1957–58, 1974–75)

== Shirt sponsors and manufacturers ==
Period	Kit manufacturer	Shirt sponsor
1985–1986	ADIDAS	P.A.C.
1987–1988	DEGI	Terme Luigiane
1988–1989	DEGI	Lagostina
1989–1990	ABM	CORVASCE
1990–1991	ABM	STANLEY
1991–1992	ASICS	DODARO
1995–1996	Hummel	Caffe' Aiello
1996–1997	Hummel	Carical
1998–2000	Kappa	Provincia di Cosenza
2001–2002	Legea	Provincia di Cosenza

== Spiritual successors ==
=== A.S. Cosenza Calcio (2003–07) ===
Castrovillari was relocated to Cosenza in 2003. The club spent 4 seasons in Serie D.

=== Fortitudo Cosenza (2007–11) ===
In 2007 A.S. Cosenza Calcio gave up its Serie D membership, but all the team players later joined new club "Fortitudo Cosenza", which is relocated from Rende.

Following this, the new club renamed itself, taking the old historical denomination of "Cosenza Calcio 1914 S.r.l." with the aim to rise up the Italian football pyramid. In 2011 the team was then excluded from professional championship by Co.Vi.So.C. of Italian Football Federation and it didn't appeal. Another phoenix club was started in Serie D, as Nuova Cosenza Calcio.

=== Nuova Cosenza Calcio ===
In summer 2011 a new club was founded as Nuova Cosenza Calcio and restarted from Serie D It wins promotion playoffs, but it is not automatically promoted.
