= ASD Biellese 1902 =

Italian football club

Biellese
- Full name: Associazione Sportiva Dilettantistica; Biellese 1902
- Founded: claimed 1902; 124 years ago historically 1919; 107 years ago refounded in 1993; 33 years ago • 2010; 16 years ago
- Ground: Stadio La Marmora-Pozzo, Biella, Italy
- Capacity: 3,800
- Chairman: Luca Rossetto
- Manager: Alberto Rizzo
- League: Serie D Group A
- 2025–26: Serie D, 3rd of 18
- Website: www.biellesecalcio.it
Home colours	Away colours

Associazione Sportiva Dilettantistica Biellese 1902 is an Italian football club, based in Biella, Piedmont that currently plays in Serie D.

== History ==
=== Early years ===
The historic club was founded in 1902 as U.S. Biellese. It had its best results in the 1920s, when it won the Second Division achieving the National Division, the Serie A's forerunner of that period. In 1930 the club changed its name to A.S. Biellese. Refounded in 1945 following the end of World War II, they resumed from Serie B, being however relegated immediately to Serie C. The club played in the minor leagues of Italian football ever since.

=== A.S. Biellese 1902 ===
The Logo of A.S. Biellese 1902

In the summer 1993 the provincial club of F.C. Vigliano, just promoted in Eccellenza Piemonte, changes its name to F.C.V. Biellese-Vigliano which becomes Biellese F.C. in 1997, for regaining A.S. Biellese 1902 only in 2001.

A.S. Biellese 1902 finished 17th in Girone A of Serie C2 2006-07 and was forced to play in the relegation playoffs, where it lost 3–2 on aggregate to 14th-placed Lumezzane, and was relegated to Serie D.

In the Serie D 2007–08 season, the team played in Girone A where it placed a distant second to Alessandria. However, the team did participate in the Serie D playoffs but failed to qualify for the group stage of the tournament.

In the Serie D 2008–09 season, Biellese was placed first in Girone A and has won direct promotion to Lega Pro Seconda Divisione, but has decided to self-relegate to Eccellenza classifying in the season 2009–10, 11th.

In July 2010 the club was disbanded.

=== A.S.D. Junior Biellese Libertas ===
In summer 2010, two minor local clubs:

- A.S.D. Junior Biellese 2009, from the Terza Categoria and
- A.S.D. Libertas Biella Cossato, that has played in Promozione Piemonte group A the previous season placing 12th,

have decided to merge, for take the place of the old A.S. Biellese 1902, to form A.S.D. Junior Biellese Libertas.

It in the season 2010–11, it has maintained the same league of the A.S.D. Libertas Biella Cossato and has played so always in Promozione Piemonte group A who has won and thus was promoted to Eccellenza Piedmont and Aosta Valley.

== Colors and badge ==
The team's colors are black and white. The away colors are usually red and white.

== Current squad ==
As of 3 February 2026

Note: Flags indicate national team as defined under FIFA eligibility rules; some limited exceptions apply. Players may hold more than one non-FIFA nationality.

No.	Pos.	Nation	Player
1	GK	ITA	Mattia Vergna
3	DF	ITA	Davide Facchetti
4	MF	ITA	Giuseppe Colletta
6	DF	ITA	Matteo Gaida
7	FW	ITA	Emanuele Marra
8	MF	ITA	Riccardo Secondo
9	FW	ITA	Simone Menabò
10	MF	ITA	Stefano Beltrame
11	FW	ITA	Edoardo Artiglia
12	GK	ITA	Alessandro Ghisleri (on loan from Pro Vercelli)
14	DF	ITA	Daniele Brancato
17	MF	ITA	Stefano Capellupo
20	MF	ITA	Riccardo De Mori

No.	Pos.	Nation	Player
21	MF	ITA	Cristian Velcani
22	GK	ITA	Matteo Biundo
23	DF	ITA	Davide Finizio (on loan from Torino Primavera)
27	FW	ITA	Jabir Naamad
28	DF	ITA	Vittorio Tommasino
29	MF	ITA	Costanzo Bottone
30	MF	ITA	Davide Gila
33	DF	ITA	Nicolò Pavan
45	MF	ITA	Facundo Di Cesare
47	MF	ITA	Santo Bevilacqua
72	MF	ITA	Abdelaziz Madiq
90	FW	MAR	Soufiane Sekka
95	MF	ITA	Giovanni Graziano
