= 2007–08 Eccellenza =

This is a list of division winners and playoff matches in the regionally organized Eccellenza 2007–2008, which is the 6th level of Italian football. A total of 36 teams are promoted to Serie D for the 2008–09 season. The first-placed team from each of the 28 divisions is promoted directly. The seven winners of the national playoffs are also promoted. Finally, the 36th spot is reserved for the winner of the Coppa Italia Dilettanti. This year, the winner was Hinterreggio, which also won direct promotion as divisional winner in the region of Calabria, thus Pro Settimo & Eureka won promotion as Coppa Italia Dilettanti runners-up.

== Division winners ==
	Region/Division	Winners
1	Abruzzo	Chieti
2	Basilicata	Sporting Genzano
3	Calabria	Hinterreggio
4	Campania – A	Pianura
5	Campania – B	Vico Equense
6	Emilia-Romagna – A	Fiorenzuola
7	Emilia-Romagna – B	Comacchio Lidi
8	Friuli-Venezia Giulia	Pordenone
9	Lazio – A	Civitavecchia
10	Lazio – B	Gaeta
11	Liguria	Virtus Entella
12	Lombardy – A	Casteggio Broni
13	Lombardy – B	AlzanoCene
14	Lombardy – C	Nuova Verolese
15	Marche	Elpidiense Cascinare
16	Molise	Atletico Trivento
17	Piedmont & Aosta Valley – A	Valle d'Aosta
18	Piedmont & Aosta Valley – B	Albese
19	Apulia	Francavilla
20	Sardinia	Budoni
21	Sicily – A	Nissa
22	Sicily – B	Castiglione
23	Tuscany – A	Mobilieri Ponsacco
24	Tuscany – B	Calenzano
25	Trentino-Alto Adige/Südtirol	Bolzano
26	Umbria	Deruta
27	Veneto – A	Somma
28	Veneto – B	Sagittaria Julia

== Regional playoffs ==
A number of playoff tournaments were organized by some Regional Committees in order to choose a team for each of the Eccellenza rounds.

The following Regional Committees decided instead not to organize regional playoffs, instead choosing to directly appoint regular season runners-up for the national playoffs:

- Trentino-Alto Adige/Südtirol: Brixen
- Veneto: Albignasego (A), Edo Mestre (B)
- Friuli-Venezia Giulia: Manzanese
- Lazio: Aprilia (A), Boville Ernica (B)
- Abruzzo: Casoli

=== Piedmont & Valle d'Aosta ===
Girone A

Playoff finals

Team 1	Agg.	Team 2	1st leg	2nd leg
Settimo	(ag)3–3	Borgosesia	1–1	2–2

Teams admitted to playoffs
Position	Team	Points
2nd	Borgosesia	58
3rd	Pro Settimo & Eureka	57
4th	Settimo	54

Girone B

Playoff semifinals

Team 1	Agg.	Team 2	1st leg	2nd leg
Bra	2–2(ag)	Airaschese	2–2	0–0

Playoff finals

Team 1	Agg.	Team 2	1st leg	2nd leg
Airaschese	4–0	Castellazzo Bormida	1–0	3–0

Teams admitted to playoffs
Position	Team	Points
2nd	Castellazzo Bormida	59
3rd	Airaschese	55
4th	Bra	49

=== Lombardy ===
Girone A

Playoff semifinals

Team 1	Score	Team 2
Cantù San Paolo	1–0	Saronno
Corsico	3–0	Cinisellese

Playoff finals

Team 1	Score	Team 2
Cantù San Paolo	2–1	Corsico

Teams admitted to playoffs
Position	Team	Points
2nd	Cantù San Paolo	66
3rd	Corsico	66
4th	Cinisellese	65
5th	Saronno	63

Girone B

Playoff semifinals

Team 1	Score	Team 2
Pontisola	(et)2–1	Sondrio
Folgore Verano	1–0	Seregno

Playoff finals

Team 1	Score	Team 2
Pontisola	0–4	Folgore Verano

Teams admitted to playoffs
Position	Team	Points
2nd	Pontisola	60
3rd	Folgore Verano	58
4th	Seregno	56
5th	Sondrio	53

Girone C

Playoff semifinals

Team 1	Score	Team 2
Suzzara	2–1	Palazzolo
Chiari	2–1	Nuova Marmirolo

Playoff finals

Team 1	Score	Team 2
Suzzara	2–1	Chiari

Teams admitted to playoffs
Position	Team	Points
2nd	Suzzara	68
3rd	Chiari	60
4th	Nuova Marmirolo	57
5th	Palazzolo	57

=== Tuscany ===
Girone A

Playoff semifinals

Team 1	Agg.	Team 2	1st leg	2nd leg
Forte dei Marmi	3–3(b)	Pietrasanta	2–0	1–3
Camaiore	3–3(b)	Sangimignano	0–2	3–1

Playoff finals

Team 1	Agg.	Team 2	1st leg	2nd leg
Sangimignano	4–1	Pietrasanta	3–0	1–1

Teams admitted to playoffs
Position	Team	Points
2nd	Pietrasanta	53
3rd	Sangimignano	52
4th	Camaiore	44
5th	Forte dei Marmi	43

Girone B

Playoff semifinals

Team 1	Agg.	Team 2	1st leg	2nd leg
San Donato Tavarnelle	2–1	Monteriggioni	2–0	0–1
Castelnuovese	1–1(b)	Pianese	1–1	0–0

Playoff finals

Team 1	Agg.	Team 2	1st leg	2nd leg
San Donato Tavarnelle	1–3	Pianese	1–2	0–1

Teams admitted to playoffs
Position	Team	Points
2nd	Monteriggioni	58
3rd	Pianese	53
4th	Castelnuovese	51
5th	San Donato Tavarnelle	48

=== Emilia-Romagna ===
Girone A

Playoff semifinals

Team 1	Score	Team 2
Dorando Pietri Carpi	2–3	Virtus Pavullese
Fiorano	(b)0–0	Fidenza

Playoff finals

Team 1	Agg.	Team 2	1st leg	2nd leg
Virtus Pavullese	5–3	Fiorano	3–2	2–1

Teams admitted to playoffs
Position	Team	Points
2nd	Dorando Pietri Carpi	67
3rd	Fiorano	66
4th	Fidenza	66
5th	Virtus Pavullese	61

Girone B

Playoff semifinals

Team 1	Score	Team 2
Copparese	1–0	Savignanese
Fusignano	1–0	Massa Lombarda

Playoff finals

Team 1	Agg.	Team 2	1st leg	2nd leg
Fusignano	4–4(b)	Copparese	2–1	2–3

Teams admitted to playoffs
Position	Team	Points
2nd	Copparese	63
3rd	Fusignano	60
4th	Massa Lombarda	58
5th	Savignanese	57

=== Marche ===
Playoff semifinals

Team 1	Agg.	Team 2	1st leg	2nd leg
Bikkembergs Fossombrone	0–3	Monteriggioni	0–1	0–2
Osimana	0–1	Cingolana	0–0	0–1

Playoff finals

Team 1	Score	Team 2
Jesina	0–1	Cingolana

Teams admitted to playoffs
Position	Team	Points
2nd	Jesina	56
3rd	Cingolana	54
4th	Osimana	51
5th	Bikkembergs Fossombrone	51

=== Umbria ===
Playoff semifinals

Team 1	Agg.	Team 2	1st leg	2nd leg
Castel Rigone	0–3(b)	Città di Castello	1–0	1–2
Todi	0–1	Trestina	2–2	1–2

Playoff finals

Team 1	Score	Team 2
Città di Castello	4–1	Trestina

Teams admitted to playoffs
Position	Team	Points
2nd	Città di Castello	65
3rd	Trestina	62
4th	Todi	60
5th	Castel Rigone	60

=== Molise ===
Playoff semifinals

Team 1	Agg.	Team 2	1st leg	2nd leg
Montenero	2–4	Termoli	2–1	0–3
SGM Basso Molise	1–0	Rufrae	0–0	1–0

Playoff finals

Team 1	Score	Team 2
Termoli	1–2	SGM Basso Molise

Teams admitted to playoffs
Position	Team	Points
2nd	Termoli	60
3rd	Rufrae	58
4th	SGM Basso Molise	53
5th	Montenero	52

=== Campania ===
Girone A

Playoff semifinals

Team 1	Score	Team 2
Alba Sannio	(b)1–1	Gladiator
Atletico Nola	2–0	Virtus Volla

Playoff finals

Team 1	Score	Team 2
Alba Sannio	2–1	Atletico Nola

Teams admitted to playoffs
Position	Team	Points
2nd	Alba Sannio	68
3rd	Atletico Nola	59
4th	Virtus Volla	56
5th	Gladiator	52

Girone B

Playoff semifinals

Team 1	Score	Team 2
Battipagliese	3–2	Agropoli
Real Ebolitana	1–0	Serino

Playoff finals

Team 1	Score	Team 2
Battipagliese	(b)3–3	Real Ebolitana

Teams admitted to playoffs
Position	Team	Points
2nd	Battipagliese	69
3rd	Real Ebolitana	57
4th	Serino	51
5th	Agropoli	48

=== Apulia ===
Playoff semifinals

Team 1	Agg.	Team 2	1st leg	2nd leg
Lucera	1–3	Bisceglie	1–1	0–2
Virtus Casarano	6–1	Atletico Corato	4–1	2–0

Playoff finals

Team 1	Agg.	Team 2	1st leg	2nd leg
Virtus Casarano	0–1	Bisceglie	0–0	0–1

Teams admitted to playoffs
Position	Team	Points
2nd	Bisceglie	62
3rd	Atletico Corato	59
4th	Virtus Casarano	58
5th	Lucera	58

=== Basilicata ===
Playoff semifinals

Team 1	Agg.	Team 2	1st leg	2nd leg
Murese 2000	1–9	Ricigliano	0–5	1–4
Atella Monticchio	3–2	Avigliano	2–1	1–1

Playoff finals

Team 1	Score	Team 2
Ricigliano	4–1	Atella Monticchio

Teams admitted to playoffs
Position	Team	Points
2nd	Ricigliano	64
3rd	Avigliano	59
4th	Atella Monticchio	50
5th	Murese 2000	46

=== Calabria ===
Playoff semifinals

Team 1	Agg.	Team 2	1st leg	2nd leg
Sambiase	0–1	Praia	0–0	0–1
Taurianovese	5–3	Scalea	2–1	3–2

Playoff finals

Team 1	Agg.	Team 2	1st leg	2nd leg
Taurianovese	2–3	Praia	1–0	1–3

Teams admitted to playoffs
Position	Team	Points
2nd	Praia	62
3rd	Scalea	59
4th	Taurianovese	58
5th	Sambiase	58

=== Sicily ===
Girone A

Playoff semifinals

Team 1	Score	Team 2
Trapani	2–0	Mazara
Gattopardo	3–2	Enna

Playoff finals

Team 1	Score	Team 2
Trapani	2–0	Gattopardo

Teams admitted to playoffs
Position	Team	Points
2nd	Trapani	63
3rd	Gattopardo	56
4th	Enna	52
5th	Mazara	52

Girone B

Playoff semifinals

Team 1	Score	Team 2
Camaro	2–1	Trecastagni
Palazzolo	(b)0–0	Acireale

Playoff finals

Team 1	Score	Team 2
Camaro	0–1	Palazzolo

Teams admitted to playoffs
Position	Team	Points
2nd	Camaro	59
3rd	Palazzolo	52
4th	Acireale	51
5th	Trecastagni	44

=== Sardinia ===
Playoff semifinals

Team 1	Agg.	Team 2	1st leg	2nd leg
Fertilia	4–5	San Teodoro	3–2	1–3
Samassi	3–4	Selargius	1–1	2–3

Playoff finals

Team 1	Score	Team 2
San Teodoro	2–3(et)	Selargius

Teams admitted to playoffs
Position	Team	Points
2nd	San Teodoro	58
3rd	Selargius	56
4th	Samassi	51
5th	Fertilia	47

=== Notes ===
- (ag) — Qualified through away goals rule.
- (b) — Qualified as best-placed team in regular season.

== National playoffs ==
=== Rules ===
The national playoffs involved a total of 28 teams, respectively the regional playoff winners or the second-placed teams in case regional playoffs were not organized by the correspondent committee. A total of two two-legged rounds are played in order to fill the remaining seven Serie D spots.

=== First round ===
Played on May 25 and June 1

	Team 1	Agg.	Team 2	1st leg	2nd leg
A|	Albignasego (Veneto A)	7–5	Folgore Verano (Lombardy B)	2–3	5–2
B|	Settimo (Piedmont A)	1–0	Edo Mestre (Veneto B)	1–3	0–1
C|	Airaschese (Piedmont B)	1–2	Manzanese (Friuli V.G.)	1–1	0–1
D|	Suzzara (Lombardy B)	4–2	Brixen (Trentino A.A.)	1–1	3–1
E|	Borgorosso Arenzano (Liguria)	2–6	Cantù San Paolo (Lombardy A)	2–2	0–4
F|	Copparese (Emilia-Romagna B)	5–0	Selargius (Sardinia)	2–0	3–0
G|	Boville Ernica (Lazio B)	(ag, et)1–1	Città di Castello (Umbria)	0–0	1–1
H|	Casoli (Abruzzo)	3–3 (p)5–4	Pianese (Tuscany B)	2–1	1–2
I|	Sangimignano (Tuscany A)	4–3	Virtus Pavullese (Emilia-Romagna A)	2–1	2–2
L|	Aprilia (Lazio A)	4–2	Cingolana (Marche)	2–0	2–2
M|	Ricigliano (Basilicata)	5–3	SGM Basso Molise (Molise)	3–1	2–2
N|	Trapani (Sicily A)	3–3 (p)4–2	Bisceglie (Apulia)	2–1	1–2
O|	Alba Sannio (Campania A)	2–2 (p)4–5	Palazzolo (Sicily B)	1–1	1–1
P|	Praia (Calabria)	0–1	Battipagliese (Campania B)	0–1	0–0

=== Second round ===
Played on June 8 and 15

	Team 1	Agg.	Team 2	1st leg	2nd leg
1|	Manzanese (Friuli V.G.)	0–3	Suzzara (Lombardy B)	0–2	0–1
2|	Edo Mestre (Veneto B)	4–5	Albignasego (Veneto A)	3–2	1–3
3|	Cantù San Paolo (Lombardy A)	1–2	Casoli (Abruzzo)	1–1	0–1
4|	Sangimignano (Tuscany A)	5–2	Copparese (Emilia-Romagna B)	3–1	2–1
5|	Aprilia (Lazio A)	0–2	Boville Ernica (Lazio B)	0–0	0–2
6|	Battipagliese (Campania B)	2–4	Palazzolo (Sicily B)	1–0	1–4
7|	Ricigliano (Basilicata)	3–9	Trapani (Sicily A)	2–5	1–4
