= Armando Picchi Calcio =

Italian football club

Armando Picchi
- Full name: Armando Picchi Calcio S.r.l.
- Nickname(s): Amaranto (Dark-reds)
- Founded: 1970
- Ground: Campo Sportivo Armando Picchi, Banditella, Livorno, Italy
- Capacity: 3,000
- Chairman: Stefano Conti
- Manager: Nicola Sena
- League: Promozione
Home colours	Away colours

Armando Picchi Calcio is an Italian association football club located in Livorno, Tuscany. It plays in Promozione, Tuscany round. Its colors are all-dark red.

== History ==
The Armando Picchi Calcio of Livorno was founded near to the death of the homonymous Leghorn champion Armando Picchi. Livorno Calcio relegated to the Italian Serie C in 1970, Leo and Enzo Picchi (brother and cousin of Armando) took over the local team GS Don Bosco Livorno. In collaboration with Inter Milan, they transformed it into the Armando Picchi Sports Group as a new Livorno football reality.

Alongside its first time, Armando Picchi Calcio can boast of a fine youth sector, that won two Italian championships at the Allievi and Juniores level, respectively in 1973 and 1974. In the wake of these results, the company has always emphasized the youth sector by collaborating with Livorno Calcio and Inter Milan.

The first team played for seven seasons in the Italian Eccellenza, won the championship in 2002 and obtained the first historic promotion in the Italian Serie D championship.

The team has participated in six consecutive editions in Serie D and then promotion to Serie C2 in the 2007–2008 season. Relegation to Eccellenza followed relegation to Promozione, where it plays in Tuscany round.

Notable players who have played in the junior sector of Armando Picchi Calcio are the brothers Cristiano and Alessandro Lucarelli, Leonardo Pavoletti and Stefano Brondi.

== Honours ==
=== Regional championships ===
- Eccellenza
  - Winners (1): 2002–03

=== Youth championships ===
- Campionato Allievi Nazionali Dilettanti
  - Winners (1): 1973–74
- Campionato Juniores Dilettanti
  - Winners (1): 1974–75

== Divisional movements ==
Series	Years	First	Last	Promotions	Relegations
D	6	2003–04	2008–09	never	▼1 (2008–09)
Eccellenza	7	1996–97	2009–10	▲1 (2002–03)	▼1 (2009–10)
Promozione	16	1979–80	2018–19	▲1 (1995–96)	▼1 (1985–86)
