= AC Merate =

Italian football club

Merate
- Full name: Associazione Calcio Merate
- Founded: 1928
- Ground: Stadio Cav. Enrico Ferrario, Merate, Italy
- Capacity: ~2,000
- Chairman: Roberto De Silva
- Manager: ?
- League: Serie D/B
- 2007–08: Serie D/B, 15th
Home colours	Away colours

Associazione Calcio Merate was an Italian association football club located in Merate, Lombardy. In its last season it played in Promozione but it reached Serie D. Its colors were yellow and blue the same as the A.C.D Brianza Cernusco Merate, the squad that unified A.C. Merate and F.C. Cernusco L. 1969. A.C.D. Brianza unified with Olginatese in 2020 forming U.S.D. Brianza Olginatese.

== Club story ==
The elder club was formed before 1911 as a Sport & Gymnastic club named Società Sportiva Certantes. Entered the Italian Gimnic National Federation (F.G.N.I.) on 7 November 1911 as reported by the monthly bulletin issued by the Federation Board called Il Ginnasta (the Gymnast).

Just after the end of WW2 a football team was added to the gymnastic group. In 1923 that team entered the Italian Football Federation Federazione Italiana Giuoco Calcio (F.I.G.C.) starting by the humblest league (Lombardy Regional Divisione 4).

In 1928 the football team got out of "Certantes" and founded a football devoted team named Associazione Sportiva Merate. That team attended several times the top regional level before being promoted to Division 4 (Promozione Interregionale) early 50s but never reached Divisione 3 (Serie C). Some 50 years later got back to Division 4 (Serie D) from which got back to Eccellenza (top regional level) and then in Promozione. In 2014 A.C.Merate unified with F.C.Cernusco L. 1969 located in Cernusco Lombardone that was in Terza Categoria forming A.C.D. Brianza Cernusco Merate that in the last year of its existence was in Promozione. Later on, in 2020, A.C.D. Brianza unified with Olginatese (in the last year, in Serie D) in Olginate forming U.S.D. Brianza Olginatese, now in Eccellenza.
