= US Castrovillari Calcio =

Italian football club

Castrovillari
- Full name: Unione Sportiva Castrovillari Calcio
- Founded: 1921; 2003 (refounded)
- Ground: Stadio Mimmo Rende, Castrovillari, Italy
- Capacity: 3,600
- Chairman: Giuseppe Agostini
- Manager: Salvatore Marra
- League: Eccellenza
- 2019–20: Serie D, 12th
Home colours	Away colours

Unione Sportiva Castrovillari Calcio is an Italian association football club located in Castrovillari, Calabria.

It currently plays in Eccellenza.

== History ==
The club was founded in 1921.

In 2003, the side moved to Cosenza and changed its name to A.S. Cosenza F.C., taking the place of a local club, Cosenza Calcio 1914 S.p.A., that was facing financial problem.

The club was refounded in this summer by a new company.

== Colors and badge ==
Its colors are red and black.
