= US Comacchio Lidi =

Italian football club

Comacchio Lidi
- Full name: Unione Sportiva Comacchio Lidi
- Founded: 1917
- Ground: Stadio Raibosola, Comacchio, Italy
- Capacity: circa 800
- League: Serie D/D
- 2007–08: Eccellenza Emilia-Romagna – B, 1st
| Home colours | Away colours |

Unione Sportiva Comacchio Lidi is an Italian association football club located in Comacchio, Emilia-Romagna. It currently plays in Serie D. Its colors are red and blue.
