= US Alta Vallagarina =

Italian football club

Alta Vallagarina
- Full name: Unione Sportiva Alta Vallagarina
- Nickname(s): –
- Founded: 2001
- Ground: Stadio Quercia, Rovereto, Italy
- Capacity: 4,700
- Chairman: Roberto Raffaelli
- League: Serie D/B
- 2006–07: Eccellenza Trentino-Alto Aldige, 1st
Home colours	Away colours

U.S. Alta Vallagarina is an Italian association football club located in Volano, Trentino-Alto Adige/Südtirol. It currently plays in Serie D. Its colors are red and blue.

Alta Vallagarina was formed in 2001 from the merger of U.S. Calliano and U.S. Volano, starting in the Prima Categoria. In their second year they were promoted to the Promozione as champions of Group C. After three years in the Promozione, the club were promoted to the Eccellenza following the 2005–06 season. This was followed up with another promotion, to Serie D, after finishing first in the Eccellenza Trentino-Alto Adige/Südtirol.
