= USD Castelsardo =

Italian football club

Castelsardo
- Full name: Unione Sportiva Dilettantistica Castelsardo
- Nickname(s): –
- Founded: 1958
- Ground: Stadio Comunale, Castelsardo, Italy
- Capacity: 1,000
- Chairman: Antonio Giuseppe Bayslak
- Manager: Rosario Affuso
- League: Serie D/G
- 2008–09: Serie D/G, 14th
Home colours	Away colours

Unione Sportiva Dilettantistica Castelsardo is an Italian association football club located in Castelsardo, Sardinia. It currently plays in Serie D. Its colors are red and blue.

== Famous players ==
- Antonio Langella
