= USD Cirié Calcio =

Italian football club

Ciriè
- Full name: Unione Sportiva Dilettante; Cirié Calcio
- Nickname: –
- Founded: 1930
- Ground: Stadio Comunale, Cirié, Italy
- Chairman: Leonardo Scarzella
- League: Serie D/A
- 2007–08: Serie D/A, 10th
Home colours	Away colours

USD Orbassano Cirié logo.

Unione Sportiva Dilettante Cirié Calcio (formerly Unione Sportiva Dilettante Orbassano Cirié) is an Italian association football club located in Cirié, Piedmont. It currently plays in Serie D. Its colors are black and blue.
