= SP Grottammare 1899 =

Italian football club

Grottammare
- Full name: Società Polisportiva Grottammare; 1899
- Founded: 1899
- Ground: Stadio Comunale, Grottammare, Italy
- Capacity: 1,800
- Chairman: Amedeo Pignotti
- League: Serie D/F
- 2007–08: Serie D/F, 8th
Home colours	Away colours

Società Polisportiva Grottammare 1899 is an Italian association football club located in Grottammare, Marche. It currently plays in Promozione. Its colors are white and light blue.
