= SSD Domegliara =

Italian football club

Domegliara
- Full name: Società Sportiva Dilettante Domegliara
- Nickname(s): –
- Founded: 1927
- Ground: Campo Sportivo Montindon, Sant'Ambrogio di Valpolicella, Italy
- Capacity: 1,020
- Chairman: Claudio Paiola
- Manager: Paolo Vanoli
- League: Serie D/C
- 2008–09: Serie D/C, 3rd
Home colours	Away colours

Società Sportiva Dilettante Domegliara is an Italian association football club located in Domegliara, a frazione of Sant'Ambrogio di Valpolicella, Veneto. It currently plays in Serie D. Its colors are red and black.

Domegliara were promoted from the Promozione to the Eccellenza Veneto following a 2nd-place finish in 2005–06. They bettered that feat by finishing 1st in Group A of the Eccellenza Veneto the following year. That earned them promotion to Serie D for the first time in their history.
