= Federico Brusacà =

Italian footballer

Personal information
- Date of birth: 30 January 1996 (age 30)
- Place of birth: Genoa, Italy
- Height: 1.93 m (6 ft 4 in)
- Position: Defender

Team information
- Current team: Ghivizzano Borgoamozzano
- Number: 4

Youth career
- –2016: Genoa

Senior career*
Years	Team	Apps	(Gls)
2014–2016	Genoa	0	(0)
2014–2016	→ Lavagnese (loan)	51	(4)
2016–2017	Lumezzane	1	(0)
2017	→ Lucchese (loan)	1	(0)
2017	Lavagnese	10	(0)
2018	SWQ Thunder	13	(1)
2018–2019	SCD Ligorna	28	(1)
2019–2020	Ghivizzano Borgoamozzano	19	(0)
2020–	SCD Ligorna		
- * Club domestic league appearances and goals as of 21:23, 2 March 2021 (UTC)

Federico Brusacà (born 30 January 1996) is an Italian footballer plays as a defender for SCD Ligorna. Besides Italy, he has played in Australia.

== Career statistics ==
=== Club ===
As of 29 May 2020.

Club	Season	League			National Cup		League Cup		Other		Total	
Club	Season	Division	Apps	Goals	Apps	Goals	Apps	Goals	Apps	Goals	Apps	Goals
Lavagnese (loan)	2014–15	Serie D	17	1	0	0	0	0	0	0	17	1
Lavagnese (loan)	2015–16	Serie D	34	3	0	0	0	0	1 (Note: Appearance in the Serie D Play-Off)	0	35	3
Lavagnese (loan)	Total		51	4	0	0	0	0	1	0	52	4
Lumezzane	2016–17	Lega Pro - B	1	0	0	0	0	0	0	0	1	0
Lucchese (loan)	2016–17	Lega Pro - B	1	0	0	0	0	0	0	0	1	0
Lavagnese	2017–18	Serie D	10	0	0	0	1 (Note: Appearance in the Coppa Italia Serie D)	0	0	0	11	0
SWQ Thunder	2018	NPL Queensland	13	1	0	0	–		0	0	13	1
SCD Ligorna	2018–19	Serie D	28	1	0	0	0	0	0	0	28	1
Ghivizzano Borgoamozzano	2019–20	Serie D	19	0	0	0	1	0	0	0	20	0
Career total			123	6	0	0	2	0	1	0	126	6
