= 2015–16 Serie D =

Serie D
- Season: 2015–16
- Champions: Viterbese Castrense
- Promoted: Piacenza; Venezia; Parma; Gubbio; Sambenedettese; Viterbese Castrense; Virtus Francavilla; Fondi; Siracusa
- Relegated: Vado; Acqui; Castellazzo; Novese; Caravaggio; Fiorenzuola; MapelloBonate; Sondrio; Monfalcone; Fontanafredda; Giorgione; Sacilese; Villafranca; Bellaria Igea; Clodiense; Fortis Juventus; Scandicci; Sansepolcro; Gualdo Casacastalda; Voluntas Spoleto; Isernia; Folgore Veregra; Giulianova; Amiternina; Budoni; Castiadas; San Cesareo; Astrea; Serpentara; AZ Picerno; Aprilia; Gallipoli; Leonfortese; Marsala; Scordia; Vigor Lamezia

The 2015–16 Serie D was the sixty-eighth edition of the top level Italian non-professional football championship. It represents the fourth tier in the Italian football league system.

The phoenix club of Parma Calcio was added to this league.

== Promotions ==
The nine division winners are automatically promoted to Lega Pro.

=== Playoffs ===
Teams, placed between second and fifth in each division, enter a playoff tournament after the regular season along with the Coppa Italia Serie D winner, runners-up and best semi-finalist. The tournament provides a priority list for entry into the next year Lega Pro in the case any of the professional teams fail to meet the minimum criteria to participate.

== Scudetto Serie D ==
The nine division winners enter a tournament which determines the overall Serie D champions and the winner is awarded the Scudetto Serie D.

== Standings ==
=== Girone A ===
==== Teams ====
Teams from Piedmont, Liguria and Lombardy

Club	City	Stadium	Capacity	2014–15 season
Acqui	Acqui Terme	Jona Ottolenghi	1,000	10th in Serie D Girone A
Argentina	Arma di Taggia	Ezio Scalvi	1,500	15th in Serie D Girone A
Borgosesia	Borgosesia	Comunale	2,500	4th in Serie D Girone A
Bra	Bra	Attilio Bravi	830	7th in Serie D Girone A
Caronnese	Caronno Pertusella	Comunale	1,000	5th in Serie D Girone A
Castellazzo	Castellazzo Bormida	Stefano Angeleri	200	3rd in Eccellenza Piedmont Girone B
Chieri	Chieri	Piero De Paoli	3,000	3rd in Serie D Girone A
Derthona	Tortona	Fausto Coppi	2,500	18th in Serie D Girone A
Fezzanese	Fezzano	Miro Luperi	400	2nd in Eccellenza Liguria
Gozzano	Gozzano	Alfredo D'Albertas	4,000	1st in Eccellenza Piedmont Girone A
Lavagnese	Lavagna	Edoardo Riboli	800	9th in Serie D Girone A
Ligorna	Genoa	Grondona	980	1st in Eccellenza Liguria
Novese	Novi Ligure	Costante Girardengo	3,500	13th in Serie D Girone A
OltrepoVoghera	Stradella & Voghera	Giovanni Parisi	4,000	8th in Serie D Girone A
Pinerolo	Pinerolo	Luigi Barbieri	2,000	1st in Eccellenza Piedmont Girone B
Pro Settimo & Eureka	Settimo Torinese	Renzo Valla	900	6th in Serie D Girone A
RapalloBogliasco	Bogliasco (playing in Santa Margherita Ligure)	Umberto Macera	378	16th in Serie D Girone A
Sestri Levante	Sestri Levante	Giuseppe Sivori	1,500	2nd in Serie D Girone A
Sporting Bellinzago	Bellinzago Novarese	Comunale	1,000	11th in Serie D Girone A
Vado	Vado Ligure	Ferruccio Chittolina	2,000	12th in Serie D Girone A

==== League table ====
Pos	Team	Pld	W	D	L	GF	GA	GD	Pts	Qualification or relegation
1	Sporting Bellinzago (C)	38	27	5	6	74	31	+43	86	Declined promotion. Relegation to the Terza Categoria
2	Caronnese (O)	38	24	10	4	74	23	+51	82	Qualification for Promotion play-off
3	Lavagnese	38	21	11	6	66	30	+36	74	Qualification for Promotion play-off
4	Chieri	38	22	6	10	74	41	+33	72	Qualification for Promotion play-off
5	Argentina	38	18	12	8	48	25	+23	66	Qualification for Promotion play-off
6	Gozzano	38	18	9	11	66	38	+28	63	
7	Sestri Levante	38	16	13	9	40	25	+15	61	
8	Pinerolo	38	19	4	15	50	46	+4	61	
9	RapalloBogliasco	38	16	9	13	52	40	+12	57	
10	OltrepoVoghera	38	13	14	11	53	44	+9	53	
11	Derthona	38	13	13	12	52	48	+4	52	
12	Bra	38	15	6	17	53	55	−2	51	
13	Borgosesia	38	12	11	15	40	46	−6	47	
14	Pro Settimo & Eureka	38	11	10	17	36	45	−9	43	
15	Ligorna	38	10	10	18	45	73	−28	40	
16	Vado (R)	38	10	10	18	43	61	−18	40	Qualification for Relegation play-off
17	Fezzanese (O)	38	9	7	22	38	75	−37	34	Qualification for Relegation play-off
18	Acqui (R)	38	7	7	24	29	70	−41	28	2016–17 Eccellenza
19	Castellazzo (R)	38	5	7	26	29	73	−44	22	2016–17 Eccellenza
20	Novese (R)	38	5	4	29	26	99	−73	19	2016–17 Eccellenza

Source: Soccerway
Rules for classification: 1) points; 2) goal difference; 3) number of goals scored.
(C) Champions; (O) Play-off winners; (R) Relegated

=== Girone B ===
==== Teams ====
Teams from Lombardy & Veneto

Club	City	Stadium	Capacity	2014–15 season
Bustese Roncalli	Busto Garolfo	Comunale		1st in Eccellenza Lombardy Girone A
Caravaggio	Caravaggio	Comunale	3,000	16th in Serie D Girone B
Ciliverghe Mazzano	Mazzano	Comunale Molinetto		9th in Serie D Girone B
Ciserano	Ciserano (playing in Cologno al Serio)	Giacinto Facchetti		4th in Serie D Girone B
Fiorenzuola	Fiorenzuola d'Arda	Comunale	4,000	1st in Eccellenza Emilia-Romagna Girone A
Folgore Caratese	Carate Brianza	XXV Aprile	3,000	17th in Serie D Girone B
Grumellese	Grumello del Monte	Comunale		1st in Eccellenza Lombardy Girone C
Inveruno	Inveruno	Comunale	600	12th in Serie D Girone B
Lecco	Lecco	Rigamonti-Ceppi	4,977	2nd in Serie D Girone B
MapelloBonate	Mapello and Bonate Sopra (playing in Mapello)	Comunale	1,000	14th in Serie D Girone B
Monza	Monza	Brianteo	18,568	15th in Lega Pro Girone A
Olginatese	Olginate	Comunale	1,000	7th in Serie D Girone B
Pergolettese	Crema	Giuseppe Voltini	4,100	6th in Serie D Girone B
Piacenza	Piacenza	Leonardo Garilli	21,668	4th in Serie D Girone D
Pontisola	Ponte San Pietro, Terno d'Isola and Chignolo d'Isola (playing in Ponte San Pietro)	Matteo Legler	2,000	8th in Serie D Girone B
Pro Sesto	Sesto San Giovanni	Breda	4,500	15th in Serie D Girone B
Seregno	Seregno	Ferruccio	3,700	3rd in Serie D Girone B
Sondrio	Sondrio	Coni Castellina	1,300	10th in Serie D Girone B
Varesina	Venegono Superiore and Castiglione Olona	Comunale		2nd in Eccellenza Lombardy Girone A
Virtus Bergamo	Alzano and Seriate	Carillo Pesenti Pigna	1,900	1st in Eccellenza Lombardy Girone B (as AlzanoCene)

==== League table ====
Pos	Team	Pld	W	D	L	GF	GA	GD	Pts	Promotion or relegation
1	Piacenza (C, P)	38	30	6	2	85	27	+58	96	2016–17 Lega Pro
2	Lecco (O)	38	23	11	4	83	41	+42	80	Qualification for Promotion play-off
3	Seregno	38	18	10	10	63	47	+16	64	Qualification for Promotion play-off
4	Ciliverghe Mazzano	38	18	7	13	48	49	−1	61	Qualification for Promotion play-off
5	Pontisola	38	17	10	11	63	48	+15	61	Qualification for Promotion play-off
6	Olginatese	38	15	11	12	57	50	+7	56	
7	Inveruno	38	15	8	15	65	57	+8	53	
8	Ciserano	38	13	14	11	48	55	−7	53	
9	Folgore Caratese	38	11	17	10	52	48	+4	50	
10	Monza	38	12	13	13	52	49	+3	49	
11	Grumellese	38	12	12	14	47	51	−4	48	
12	Pro Sesto	38	13	8	17	50	51	−1	47	
13	Varesina	38	11	14	13	42	49	−7	47	
14	Pergolettese	38	11	13	14	38	42	−4	46	
15	Bustese Roncalli	38	11	12	15	47	58	−11	45	
16	Virtus Bergamo	38	12	9	17	44	61	−17	45	
17	Caravaggio (R)	38	7	13	18	35	56	−21	34	2016–17 Eccellenza
18	Fiorenzuola (R)	38	5	18	15	28	51	−23	33	2016–17 Eccellenza
19	MapelloBonate (R)	38	6	13	19	36	59	−23	31	2016–17 Eccellenza
20	Sondrio (R)	38	6	9	23	39	73	−34	27	2016–17 Eccellenza

Source: Soccerway
Rules for classification: 1) points; 2) goal difference; 3) number of goals scored.
(C) Champions; (O) Play-off winners; (P) Promoted; (R) Relegated

=== Girone C ===
==== Teams ====
Teams from Friuli-Venezia Giulia, Trentino-Alto Adige/Südtirol & Veneto

Club	City	Stadium	Capacity	2014–15 season
Abano	Abano Terme	Stadio delle Terme	1,000	6th in Serie D Girone D
Belluno	Belluno	Polisportivo	2,585	4th in Serie D Girone C
Calvi Noale	Noale	Azzurri d'Italia 2006		1st in Eccellenza Veneto Girone B
Campodarsego	Campodarsego	Aldo e Dino Ballarin	3,622	1st in Eccellenza Veneto Girone A
Dro	Dro	Comunale Oltra	500	20th in Serie D Girone C
Fontanafredda	Fontanafredda	Omero Tognon	5,000	10th in Serie D Girone C
Giorgione	Castelfranco Veneto	Comunale	2,100	13th in Serie D Girone C
Levico	Levico Terme	Comunale		1st in Eccellenza Trentino-Alto Adige
Liventina	Motta di Livenza	Luigino Samassa		2nd in Eccellenza Veneto Girone B (as Liventina Gorghense)
Luparense San Paolo	San Martino di Lupari	Gianni Casée		18th in Serie D Girone D (as Atletico San Paolo Padova)
Mestre	Mestre	Francesco Baracca	8,074	6th in Serie D Girone C (as Union Pro)
Monfalcone	Monfalcone	Comunale	2,000	1st in Eccellenza Friuli-Venezia Giulia
Montebelluna	Montebelluna	San Vigilio	2,000	8th in Serie D Girone C
Sacilese	Sacile	XXV Aprile – Aldo Castenetto	2,600	3rd in Serie D Girone C
Tamai	Brugnera	Comunale	1,000	12th in Serie D Girone C
Triestina	Trieste	Nereo Rocco	32,454	15th in Serie D Girone C
Union Ripa La Fenadora	Seren del Grappa	Comunale Boscherai	500	9th in Serie D Girone C
Venezia	Venezia	Pier Luigi Penzo	7,450	12th in Lega Pro Girone A
Virtus Verona	Verona	M.Gavagnin - S.Nocini	1,200	6th in Serie D Girone B

==== League table ====
Pos	Team	Pld	W	D	L	GF	GA	GD	Pts	Promotion or relegation
1	Venezia (C, P)	38	27	9	2	89	26	+63	90	2016–17 Lega Pro
2	Campodarsego (O)	38	22	13	3	56	31	+25	79	Qualification for Promotion play-off
3	Este	38	21	13	4	61	22	+39	76	Qualification for Promotion play-off
4	Belluno	38	18	13	7	52	38	+14	67	Qualification for Promotion play-off
5	Virtus Verona	38	17	12	9	64	37	+27	63	Qualification for Promotion play-off
6	Luparense San Paolo	38	16	10	12	66	57	+9	58	
7	Tamai	38	13	14	11	45	43	+2	53	
8	Mestre	38	13	12	13	71	54	+17	51	
9	Abano	38	12	13	13	50	47	+3	49	
10	Levico	38	12	12	14	53	53	0	48	
11	Calvi Noale	38	11	15	12	40	43	−3	48	
12	Dro	38	13	9	16	35	53	−18	48	
13	Union Ripa La Fenadora	38	11	12	15	50	56	−6	45	
14	Monfalcone (R)	38	12	7	19	47	57	−10	43	Club resigned
15	Montebelluna (O)	38	13	4	21	50	62	−12	43	Qualification for Relegation play-off
16	Triestina (O)	38	9	12	17	40	57	−17	39	Qualification for Relegation play-off
17	Liventina (R)	38	10	9	19	45	62	−17	39	Qualification for Relegation play-off
18	Fontanafredda (R)	38	8	15	15	44	62	−18	39	Qualification for Relegation play-off
19	Giorgione (R)	38	9	11	18	42	74	−32	38	2016–17 Eccellenza
20	Sacilese (R)	38	2	7	29	26	91	−65	13	2016–17 Eccellenza

Source: Soccerway
Rules for classification: 1) points; 2) goal difference; 3) number of goals scored.
(C) Champions; (O) Play-off winners; (P) Promoted; (R) Relegated

=== Girone D ===
==== Teams ====
Teams from Emilia-Romagna, Tuscany, Veneto & San Marino

Club	City	Stadium	Capacity	2014–15 season
Altovicentino	Marano Vicentino and Valdagno (playing in Valdagno)	Stadio dei Fiori	6,000	2nd in Serie D Girone C
Bellaria Igea	Bellaria-Igea Marina	Enrico Nanni	2,500	12th in Serie D Girone D
Clodiense	Chioggia	Aldo e Dino Ballarin	3,622	9th in Serie D Girone C
Correggese	Correggio	Walter Borelli	1,500	3rd in Serie D Girone D
Delta Rovigo	Rovigo	Stadio Francesco Gabrielli	3,000	2nd in Serie D Girone D
Forlì	Forlì	Tullo Morgagni	3,466	17th in Lega Pro Girone B
Fortis Juventus	Borgo San Lorenzo	Stadio Giacomo Romanelli	2,500	11th in Serie D Girone D
Imolese	Imola	Romeo Galli	4,000	10th in Serie D Girone D
Legnago Salus	Legnago	Mario Sandrini	2,152	11th in Serie D Girone C
Lentigione	Lentigione, in Brescello	Valente Levantini		1st in Eccellenza Emilia-Romagna Girone A
Mezzolara	Budrio	Pietro Zucchini	1,300	15th in Serie D Girone D
Parma	Parma	Stadio Ennio Tardini	27,906	20th in Serie A (bankruptcy)
Ravenna	Ravenna	Bruno Benelli	12,020	2nd in Eccellenza Emilia-Romagna Girone B
Ribelle	Castiglione di Ravenna	Massimo Sbrighi	1,000	14th in Serie D Girone D
Romagna Centro	Martorano (playing in Cesena)	Dino Manuzzi	23,860	17th in Serie D Girone D
Sammaurese	San Mauro Pascoli	Macrelli		1st in Eccellenza Emilia-Romagna Girone B
San Marino	(San Marino) Serravalle	Olimpico	7,000	20th in Lega Pro Girone B
Union ArzignanoChiampo	Arzignano	Tommaso Dal Molin	2,000	5th in Serie D Girone C
Villafranca	Villafranca di Verona	Comunale	1,000	13th in Serie D Girone B
Virtus Castelfranco	Castelfranco Emilia	Fausto Ferrarini	1,280	13th in Serie D Girone D

==== League table ====
Pos	Team	Pld	W	D	L	GF	GA	GD	Pts	Promotion or relegation
1	Parma (C, P)	38	28	10	0	82	17	+65	94	2016–17 Lega Pro
2	Altovicentino	38	23	8	7	84	43	+41	77	Qualification for Promotion play-off
3	Forlì (P)	38	19	12	7	69	46	+23	69	Qualification for Promotion play-off
4	San Marino	38	17	14	7	55	41	+14	65	Qualification for Promotion play-off
5	Correggese (O)	38	18	10	10	66	49	+17	64	Qualification for Promotion play-off
6	Imolese	38	18	9	11	63	41	+22	63	
7	Delta Rovigo	38	18	7	13	68	51	+17	61	
8	Ribelle	38	18	7	13	63	54	+9	61	
9	Lentigione	38	17	8	13	53	51	+2	59	
10	Sammaurese	38	15	9	14	53	50	+3	54	
11	Union ArzignanoChiampo	38	15	8	15	60	54	+6	53	
12	Legnago Salus	38	12	15	11	56	54	+2	51	
13	Ravenna	38	9	17	12	50	59	−9	44	
14	Romagna Centro	38	11	11	16	40	51	−11	44	
15	Virtus Castelfranco	38	10	12	16	50	59	−9	42	
16	Mezzolara (O)	38	7	14	17	30	55	−25	35	Qualification for Relegation play-off
17	Villafranca (R)	38	8	9	21	45	63	−18	33	Qualification for Relegation play-off
18	Bellaria Igea (R)	38	6	11	21	38	76	−38	29	2016–17 Eccellenza
19	Clodiense (R)	38	7	6	25	35	81	−46	27	2016–17 Eccellenza
20	Fortis Juventus (R)	38	2	7	29	32	97	−65	13	2016–17 Eccellenza

Source: Soccerway
Rules for classification: 1) points; 2) goal difference; 3) number of goals scored.
(C) Champions; (O) Play-off winners; (P) Promoted; (R) Relegated

=== Girone E ===
==== Teams ====
Teams from Tuscany, Umbria & Lazio

Club	City	Stadium	Capacity	2014–15 season
Città di Castello	Città di Castello	Corrado Bernicchi	1,000	1st in Eccellenza Umbria
Foligno	Foligno	Enzo Blasone	5,650	9th in Serie D Girone E
Gavorrano	Gavorrano	Romeo Malservisi	2,000	12th in Serie D Girone E
Ghivizzano Borgo a Mozzano	Coreglia Antelminelli	Carraia		2nd in Eccellenza Tuscany Girone A
Gualdo Casacastalda	Gualdo Tadino	Carlo Angelo Luzi	4,100	7th in Serie D Girone E
Gubbio	Gubbio	Pietro Barbetti	5,300	16th in Lega Pro Girone B
Jolly Montemurlo	Montemurlo	Aldo Nelli	400	9th in Serie D Girone D
Massese	Massa	degli Oliveti	11,500	5th in Serie D Girone E
Olimpia Colligiana	Colle di Val d'Elsa	Gino Manni	3,000	14th in Serie D Girone E
Pianese	Piancastagnaio	Comunale	1,000	11th in Serie D Girone E
Poggibonsi	Poggibonsi	Stefano Lotti	2,513	2nd in Serie D Girone E
Ponsacco	Ponsacco	Comunale	3,220	4th in Serie D Girone E
SanGiovanniValdarno	San Giovanni Valdarno	Virgilio Fedini	3,378	8th in Serie D Girone E (as San Giovanni Valdarno)
Sansepolcro	Sansepolcro	Giovanni Buitoni	2,000	6th in Serie D Girone E
Scandicci	Scandicci	Turri	1,800	8th in Serie D Girone D
Valdinievole Montecatini	Montecatini Terme	Daniele Mariotti		1st in Eccellenza Tuscany Girone B
Viareggio	Viareggio	Torquato Bresciani	7,000	1st in Eccellenza Tuscany Girone A
Voluntas Spoleto	Spoleto	Comunale	1,800	13th in Serie D Girone E

==== League table ====
Pos	Team	Pld	W	D	L	GF	GA	GD	Pts	Promotion or relegation
1	Gubbio (C, P)	34	23	5	6	54	29	+25	74	2016–17 Lega Pro
2	Valdinievole Montecatini	34	19	6	9	53	33	+20	63	Qualification for Promotion play-off
3	Gavorrano (O)	34	17	10	7	53	36	+17	61	Qualification for Promotion play-off
4	Poggibonsi	34	14	13	7	41	23	+18	55	Qualification for Promotion play-off
5	Ghivizzano Borgo a Mozzano	34	14	10	10	46	44	+2	52	Qualification for Promotion play-off
6	Jolly Montemurlo	34	14	10	10	42	33	+9	52	
7	Olimpia Colligiana	34	14	10	10	55	39	+16	52	
8	Foligno	34	14	7	13	48	42	+6	49	
9	Sangiovannese	34	12	12	10	47	48	−1	48	
10	Ponsacco	34	14	6	14	39	40	−1	48	
11	Pianese	34	12	11	11	45	35	+10	47	
12	Viareggio	34	11	13	10	37	33	+4	46	
13	Città di Castello	34	11	11	12	39	49	−10	44	
14	Scandicci (R)	34	8	11	15	31	46	−15	35	Qualification for Relegation play-off
15	Massese (O)	34	7	12	15	29	35	−6	33	Qualification for Relegation play-off
16	Sansepolcro (R)	34	7	11	16	26	37	−11	32	2016–17 Eccellenza
17	Gualdo Casacastalda (R)	34	4	9	21	23	58	−35	21	2016–17 Eccellenza
18	Voluntas Spoleto (R)	34	5	5	24	24	72	−48	20	2016–17 Eccellenza

Source: Soccerway
Rules for classification: 1) points; 2) goal difference; 3) number of goals scored.
(C) Champions; (O) Play-off winners; (P) Promoted; (R) Relegated

=== Girone F ===
==== Teams ====
Teams from Abruzzo, Lazio, Marche & Molise

Club	City	Stadium	Capacity	2014–15 season
Amiternina	Scoppito	Comunale	500	14th in Serie D Girone F
Avezzano	Avezzano	Dei Marsi	3,692	1st in Eccellenza Abruzzo
Campobasso	Campobasso	Romagnoli	4,000	4th in Serie D Girone F
Castelfidardo	Castelfidardo	G. Mancini	2,000	15th in Serie D Girone F
Chieti	Chieti	Guido Angelini	12,750	6th in Serie D Girone F
Fano	Fano	Raffaele Mancini	8,800	2nd in Serie D Girone F
Fermana	Fermo	Bruno Recchioni	9,500	10th in Serie D Girone F
Folgore Veregra	Falerone and Montegranaro	Comunale		1st in Eccellenza Marche
Giulianova	Giulianova	Rubens Fadini	4,347	9th in Serie D Girone F
Isernia	Isernia	Mario Lancellotta	5,000	1st in Eccellenza Molise
Jesina	Jesi	Pacifico Carotti	5,000	8th in Serie D Girone F
Matelica	Matelica	Comunale	500	2nd in Serie D Girone F
Monticelli	Ascoli Piceno	Velodromo Bartolini	1,000	2nd in Eccellenza Marche
Olympia Agnonese	Agnone	Civitelle	4,000	16th in Serie D Girone F
Recanatese	Recanati	Nicola Tubaldi	2,000	13th in Serie D Girone F
Sambenedettese	San Benedetto del Tronto	Riviera delle Palme	14,995	3rd in Serie D Girone F
San Nicolò	San Nicolò a Tordino	Gaetano Bonolis	7,498	5th in Serie D Girone F
Vis Pesaro	Pesaro	Tonino Benelli	4,050	17th in Serie D Girone F

==== League table ====
Pos	Team	Pld	W	D	L	GF	GA	GD	Pts	Promotion or relegation
1	Sambenedettese (C, P)	34	25	6	3	76	36	+40	81	2016–17 Lega Pro
2	Fano (O, P)	34	21	5	8	49	29	+20	68	Qualification for Promotion play-off
3	Campobasso	34	17	10	7	47	27	+20	61	Qualification for Promotion play-off
4	Matelica	34	18	4	12	57	37	+20	58	Qualification for Promotion play-off
5	Fermana	34	15	10	9	50	39	+11	55	Qualification for Promotion play-off
6	Chieti	34	12	13	9	49	38	+11	49	
7	Recanatese	34	13	9	12	45	50	−5	48	
8	Jesina	34	14	5	15	39	46	−7	47	
9	San Nicolò	34	12	10	12	49	42	+7	46	
10	Avezzano	34	12	8	14	51	52	−1	44	
11	Vis Pesaro	34	11	10	13	40	42	−2	43	
12	Castelfidardo	34	10	12	12	33	40	−7	42	
13	Olympia Agnonese	34	10	10	14	47	49	−2	40	
14	Monticelli (O)	34	9	10	15	42	48	−6	37	Qualification for Relegation play-off
15	Isernia (R)	34	9	10	15	27	49	−22	37	Qualification for Relegation play-off
16	Folgore Veregra (R)	34	7	11	16	34	52	−18	32	2016–17 Eccellenza
17	Giulianova (R)	34	7	6	21	27	63	−36	27	2016–17 Eccellenza
18	Amiternina (R)	34	5	9	20	34	57	−23	24	2016–17 Eccellenza

Source: Soccerway
Rules for classification: 1) points; 2) goal difference; 3) number of goals scored.
(C) Champions; (O) Play-off winners; (P) Promoted; (R) Relegated

=== Girone G ===
==== Teams ====
Teams from Lazio & Sardinia

Club	City	Stadium	Capacity	2014–15 season
Albalonga	Albano Laziale	Pio XII	1,500	1st in Eccellenza Lazio Girone B
Arzachena	Arzachena	Biagio Pirina	3,100	7th in Serie D Girone G
Astrea	Rome	Casal del Marmo	2,500	12th in Serie D Girone G
Budoni	Budoni	Comunale	1,500	4th in Serie D Girone G
Castiadas	Castiadas	Comunale	200	2nd in Eccellenza Sardinia
Cynthia	Genzano di Roma	Stadio Comunale (Genzano di Roma)	4,550	9th in Serie D Girone G
Flaminia Civita Castellana	Civita Castellana	Turrido Madani	1,300	10th in Serie D Girone E
Grosseto	Grosseto	Carlo Zecchini	10,200	15th in Lega Pro Girone B
Lanusei	Lanusei	Comunale		5th in Eccellenza Sardinia
Muravera	Muravera	Comunale		1st in Eccellenza Sardinia
Nuorese	Nuoro	Franco Frogheri	7,000	10th in Serie D Girone G
Olbia	Olbia	Bruno Nespoli	3,200	3rd in Serie D Girone G
Ostia Mare	Ostia	Anco Marzio	1,000	5th in Serie D Girone G
Rieti	Rieti	Stadio Centro d'Italia – Manlio Scopigno	9,980	3rd in Serie D Girone E
San Cesareo	San Cesareo	Comunale	2,000	6th in Serie D Girone G
Torres	Sassari	Vanni Sanna	12,000	20th in Lega Pro Girone A
Trastevere	Trastevere	Vittorio Bachelet		1st in Eccellenza Lazio Girone A
Viterbese Castrense	Viterbo	Attilio Gregori	3,000	2nd in Serie D Girone G

==== League table ====
Pos	Team	Pld	W	D	L	GF	GA	GD	Pts	Promotion or relegation
1	Viterbese Castrense (C, P)	34	22	10	2	67	24	+43	76	2016–17 Lega Pro
2	Grosseto	34	21	5	8	71	43	+28	68	Qualification for Promotion play-off
3	Torres	34	19	9	6	64	28	+36	62 (Note: 4 points deducted)	Qualification for Promotion play-off
4	Rieti	34	19	5	10	52	30	+22	62	Qualification for Promotion play-off
5	Olbia (O, P)	34	18	9	7	58	42	+16	62 (Note: 1 point deducted)	Qualification for Promotion play-off
6	Arzachena	34	17	8	9	44	37	+7	59	
7	Albalonga	34	17	6	11	63	45	+18	57	
8	Nuorese	34	13	12	9	41	33	+8	51	
9	Flaminia Civita Castellana	34	14	5	15	49	44	+5	47	
10	Ostia Mare	34	12	8	14	34	34	0	44	
11	Trastevere	34	11	7	16	35	38	−3	40	
12	Muravera	34	9	10	15	38	51	−13	37	
13	Lanusei (O)	34	8	11	15	25	49	−24	35	Qualification for Relegation play-off
14	Budoni (R)	34	8	10	16	36	49	−13	34	Qualification for Relegation play-off
15	Cynthia (O)	34	8	9	17	37	60	−23	33	Qualification for Relegation play-off
16	Castiadas (R)	34	7	10	17	31	57	−26	31	Qualification for Relegation play-off
17	San Cesareo (R)	34	7	7	20	24	48	−24	28	2016–17 Eccellenza
18	Astrea (R)	34	3	5	26	22	79	−57	14	2016–17 Eccellenza

Source: Soccerway
Rules for classification: 1) points; 2) goal difference; 3) number of goals scored.
(C) Champions; (O) Play-off winners; (P) Promoted; (R) Relegated

=== Girone H ===
==== Teams ====
Teams from Apulia, Basilicata, Campania and Lazio.

Club	City	Stadium	Capacity	2014–15 season
Aprilia	Aprilia	Quinto Ricci	2,000	11th in Serie D Girone G
AZ Picerno	Picerno	Donato Curcio		1st in Eccellenza Basilicata
Bisceglie	Bisceglie	Gustavo Ventura	5,000	4th in Serie D Girone H
Fondi	Fondi	Domenico Purificato	2,500	8th in Serie D Girone G
Francavilla	Francavilla in Sinni	Nunzio Fittipaldi	1,200	11th in Serie D Girone H
Gallipoli	Gallipoli	Antonio Bianco	5,000	7th in Serie D Girone H
Isola Liri	Isola del Liri	Conte Arduino Mangoni	3,008	15th in Serie D Girone G
Manfredonia	Manfredonia	Miramare	4,076	9th in Serie D Girone H
Progreditur Marcianise	Marcianise	Progreditur	4,550	9th in Serie D Girone I
Nardò	Nardò	Giovanni Paolo II	5,000	2nd in Eccellenza Apulia
Pomigliano	Pomigliano d'Arco	Ugo Gobbato	1,600	13th in Serie D Girone H
Potenza	Potenza	Alfredo Viviani	5,500	3rd in Serie D Girone H
San Severo	San Severo	Ricciardelli	300	12th in Serie D Girone H
Serpentara	Bellegra and Olevano Romano	Giovanni Savoia		2nd in Eccellenza Lazio Girone B
Taranto	Taranto	Erasmo Iacovone	27,584	2nd in Serie D Girone H
Torrecuso	Torrecuso	G. Ocone	1,500	4th in Serie D Girone I
Turris	Torre del Greco	Amerigo Liguori	5,300	1st in Eccellenza Campania Girone A
Virtus Francavilla	Francavilla Fontana	Giovanni Paolo II	5,000	1st in Eccellenza Apulia

==== League table ====
Pos	Team	Pld	W	D	L	GF	GA	GD	Pts	Promotion or relegation
1	Virtus Francavilla (C, P)	34	18	12	4	45	26	+19	66	2016–17 Lega Pro
2	Taranto (P)	34	18	9	7	61	34	+27	63	Qualification for Promotion play-off
3	Francavilla	34	17	10	7	61	35	+26	61	Qualification for Promotion play-off
4	Nardò	34	17	9	8	49	26	+23	60	Qualification for Promotion play-off
5	Fondi (P)	34	13	13	8	75	52	+23	52	Qualification for Promotion play-off
6	Manfredonia	34	14	8	12	45	49	−4	49 (Note: 1 point deducted)	
7	Pomigliano	34	11	14	9	47	46	+1	47	
8	Bisceglie	34	13	8	13	42	44	−2	47	
9	Progreditur Marcianise	34	11	12	11	40	38	+2	45	
10	Torrecuso (R)	34	11	11	12	57	50	+7	44	Club resigned
11	Isola Liri (R)	34	11	11	12	42	45	−3	44	Club resigned
12	Potenza	34	11	11	12	43	58	−15	44	
13	Turris	34	11	10	13	40	50	−10	43	
14	San Severo (O)	34	13	5	16	58	59	−1	42 (Note: 2 points deducted)	Qualification for Relegation play-off
15	Serpentara (R)	34	9	14	11	44	50	−6	41	Qualification for Relegation play-off
16	AZ Picerno (R)	34	8	6	20	43	60	−17	30	2016–17 Eccellenza
17	Aprilia (R)	34	7	7	20	37	63	−26	28	2016–17 Eccellenza
18	Gallipoli (R)	34	5	6	23	25	69	−44	21	2016–17 Eccellenza

Updated to match(es) played on 8 May 2016. Source: Soccerway
Rules for classification: 1) points; 2) goal difference; 3) number of goals scored.
(C) Champions; (O) Play-off winners; (P) Promoted; (R) Relegated

=== Girone I ===
==== Teams ====
Teams from Calabria, Campania and Sicily.

Club	City	Stadium	Capacity	2014–15 season
Agropoli	Agropoli	Raffaele Guariglia	5,000	3rd in Serie D Girone I
Aversa Normanna	Aversa	Augusto Bisceglia	2,555	16th in Lega Pro Girone C
Cavese	Cava de' Tirreni	Simonetta Lamberti	5,200	5th in Serie D Girone H
Due Torri	Piraino	Enzo Vasi	3,800	8th in Serie D Girone I
Gelbison Cilento	Vallo della Lucania	Giovanni Morra	4,000	6th in Serie D Girone H
Gragnano	Gragnano	San Michele	2,000	1st in Eccellenza Campania Girone B
Leonfortese	Leonforte	Comunale	2,000	7th in Serie D Girone I
Marsala	Marsala	Antonino Lombardo Angotta	13,500	1st in Eccellenza Sicily Girone A
Nerostellati Frattese	Frattamaggiore	Pasquale Ianniello	5,000	6th in Serie D Girone I
Noto	Noto	Polisportivo Palatucci	3,000	13th in Serie D Girone I
Palmese	Palmi	Giuseppe Lopresti	2,500	1st in Eccellenza Calabria
Reggio Calabria	Reggio Calabria	Oreste Granillo	27,454	18th in Lega Pro Girone C (as Reggina)
Rende	Rende	Marco Lorenzon	5,000	2nd in Serie D Girone I
Roccella	Roccella Ionica	Ninetto Muscolo	2,000	12th in Serie D Girone I
Sarnese	Sarno	Principe Filomarino		7th in Serie D Girone H
Scordia	Scordia	Aldo Binanti		2nd in Eccellenza Sicily Girone B
Siracusa	Syracuse (Italian: Siracusa)	Nicola De Simone	6,870	1st in Eccellenza Sicily Girone B
Vibonese	Vibo Valentia	Luigi Razza	6,000	2nd in Eccellenza Calabria
Vigor Lamezia	Lamezia Terme	Guido D'Ippolito	5,842	20th in Lega Pro Girone C

==== League table ====
Pos	Team	Pld	W	D	L	GF	GA	GD	Pts	Promotion or relegation
1	Siracusa (C, P)	36	21	11	4	72	32	+40	74	2016–17 Lega Pro
2	Nerostellati Frattese	36	21	8	7	70	34	+36	70 (Note: 1 point deducted)	Qualification for Promotion play-off
3	Cavese (O)	36	20	8	8	54	36	+18	68	Qualification for Promotion play-off
4	Reggio Calabria (P)	36	15	11	10	47	38	+9	56	Qualification for Promotion play-off
5	Vibonese (P)	36	14	12	10	49	40	+9	54	Qualification for Promotion play-off
6	Aversa Normanna	36	13	14	9	45	37	+8	51 (Note: 2 points deducted)	
7	Due Torri	36	12	14	10	27	27	0	50	
8	Roccella	36	12	12	12	43	50	−7	48	
9	Sarnese	36	10	17	9	32	34	−2	47	
10	Gragnano	36	8	20	8	45	42	+3	44	
11	Rende	36	10	13	13	35	35	0	43	
12	Noto (R)	36	7	20	9	31	32	−1	41	Club resigned
13	Agropoli	36	9	13	14	32	44	−12	40	
14	Leonfortese (R)	36	7	19	10	26	39	−13	40	Qualification for Relegation play-off
15	Marsala (R)	36	9	13	14	35	40	−5	40	Qualification for Relegation play-off
16	Palmese (O)	36	8	12	16	37	49	−12	36	Qualification for Relegation play-off
17	Gelbison Cilento (O)	36	7	13	16	32	48	−16	34	Qualification for Relegation play-off
18	Scordia (R)	36	7	10	19	32	56	−24	31	2016–17 Eccellenza
19	Vigor Lamezia (R)	36	7	10	19	24	55	−31	28 (Note: 3 points deducted)	2016–17 Eccellenza

Updated to match(es) played on 8 May 2016. Source: Soccerway
Rules for classification: 1) points; 2) goal difference; 3) number of goals scored.
(C) Champions; (O) Play-off winners; (P) Promoted; (R) Relegated

== Scudetto Dilettanti ==
First round

- division winners placed into 3 groups of 3
- group winners and best second-placed team qualify for semi-finals
- rank in Discipline Cup and head-to-head will break a tie or ties in points for the top position in a group
- Listed in order in Discipline Cup: Sporting Bellinzago, Viterbese Castrense, Sambenedettese, Parma, Piacenza, Virtus Francavilla, Venezia, Siracusa, Gubbio.

Group 1

Team	Pld	W	D	L	GF	GA	GD	Pts
Sporting Bellinzago	2	1	1	0	4	3	+1	4
Piacenza	2	1	1	0	5	1	+4	4
Venezia	2	0	0	2	4	9	−5	0

15 May 2016, 16:00
Venezia (C)	3–4	Sporting Bellinzago (A)	Venezia
22 May 2016, 16:00
Piacenza (B)	5–1	Venezia (C)	Piacenza
29 May 2016, 15:30
Sporting Bellinzago (A)	0–0	Piacenza (B)	Bellinzago Novarese

Group 2

Team	Pld	W	D	L	GF	GA	GD	Pts
Gubbio	2	2	0	0	3	1	+2	6
Sambenedettese	2	0	1	1	2	3	−1	1
Parma	2	0	1	1	3	4	−1	1

14 May 2016, 15:00
Gubbio (E)	2–1	Parma (D)	Sansepolcro
22 May 2016, 16:00
Parma (D)	2–2	Sambenedettese (F)	Parma
29 May 2016, 15:30
Sambenedettese (F)	0–1	Gubbio (E)	San Benedetto del Tronto

Group 3

Team	Pld	W	D	L	GF	GA	GD	Pts
Viterbese Castrense	2	1	0	1	6	4	+2	3
Virtus Francavilla	2	1	0	1	5	5	0	3
Siracusa	2	1	0	1	4	6	−2	3

15 May 2016, 15:00
Siracusa (I)	1–4	Viterbese Castrense (G)	Syracuse
22 May 2016, 15:30
Virtus Francavilla (H)	2–3	Siracusa (I)	Francavilla Fontana
29 May 2016, 15:30
Viterbese Castrense (G)	2–3	Virtus Francavilla (H)	Viterbo

Semi-finals

- On neutral ground.

3 June 2016, 16:30
Viterbese Castrense (G)	6–1	Sporting Bellinzago (A)	Florence
3 June 2016, 20:30
Gubbio (E)	2–3	Piacenza (B)	Pontedera

Final

- On neutral ground.

5 June 2016, 18:00
Viterbese Castrense (G)	2–1	Piacenza (B)	Viareggio

Scudetto winners: Viterbese Castrense

== Promotion play-off ==
=== Rules ===
- The two rounds were one-legged matches played in the home field of the best-placed team.
- The games ending in ties were extended to extra time. The higher classified team was declared the winner if the game was still tied after extra time. Penalty kicks were not taken.
- Round one matched 2nd & 5th-placed teams and 3rd & 4th-placed teams within each division.
- The two winners from each division played each other in the second round.

==== Repechages ====
- The tournament results provide a list, starting with the winner, by which vacancies could be filled in Serie C.
- If the winner is not admitted to this league it gets €30,000, while the replacement (the finalist) instead gets €15,000.

=== First round ===
- matches for divisions G, H played on 22 May 2016; all others played on 15 May 2016
- Single-legged matches played at best-placed club's home field: the 2nd-placed team plays the 5th-placed team at home, the 3rd-placed team plays the 4th placed team at home
- Games ending in a tie are extended to extra time; if still tied, the higher-classified team wins

Team 1	Score	Team 2
Caronnese (A2)	2–0	(A5) Argentina
Lavagnese (A3)	5–2	(A4) Chieri
Lecco (B2)	3–3 (a.e.t.)	(B5) Pontisola
Seregno (B3)	2–0	(B4) Ciliverghe Mazzano
Campodarsego (C2)	2–2 (a.e.t.)	(C5) Virtus Verona
Este (C3)	0–1	(C4) Belluno
Altovicentino (D2)	1–4 (a.e.t.)	(D5) Correggese
Forlì (D3)	3–1	(D4) San Marino
Valdinievole Montecatini (E2)	1–0	(E5) Ghivizzano Borgo a Mozzano
Gavorrano (E3)	2–1	(E4) Poggibonsi
Fano (F2)	2–2 (a.e.t.)	(F5) Fermana
Campobasso (F3)	2–1	(F4) Matelica
Grosseto (G2)	1–2	(G5) Olbia
Torres (G3)	1–1 (a.e.t.)	(G4) Rieti
Taranto (H2)	1–2 (a.e.t.)	(H5) Fondi
Francavilla (H3)	2–0	(H4) Nardò
Nerostellati Frattese (I2)	1–0	(I5) Vibonese
Cavese (I3)	2–1	(I4) Reggio Calabria

=== Second round ===
- matches for divisions G, H played on 29 May 2016; all others played on 22 May 2016
- Single-legged matches played at best-placed club's home field
- Games ending in a tie are extended to extra time; if still tied, the higher-classified team wins

Team 1	Score	Team 2
Caronnese (A2)	2–0	(A3) Lavagnese
Lecco (B2)	2–2 (a.e.t.)	(B3) Seregno
Campodarsego (C2)	2–1	(C4) Belluno
Forlì (D3)	0–2	(D5) Correggese
Valdinievole Montecatini (E2)	1–2	(E3) Gavorrano
Fano (F2)	3–2	(F3) Campobasso
Torres (G3)	0–1	(G5) Olbia
Francavilla (H3)	0–1	(H5) Fondi
Nerostellati Frattese (I2)	2–3 (a.e.t.)	(I3) Cavese

== Relegation play-off ==
- Match between Lanusei and Castiadas played on 21 May 2016; match between Leonfortese and Gelbison Cilento played on 29 May 2016; all others played on 22 May 2016
- Single-legged matches played on best-placed club's home ground
- In case of tied score, extra time is played; if score is still level, best-placed team wins
- Team highlighted in green is saved, other is relegated to Eccellenza

Team 1	Score	Team 2
(A) Vado	0–2	Fezzanese
(C) Montebelluna	2–0	Fontanafredda
(C) Triestina	1–1 (a.e.t.)	Liventina
(D) Mezzolara	2–1	Villafranca
(E) Scandicci	0–3	Massese
(F) Monticelli	1–1 (a.e.t.)	Isernia
(G) Lanusei	1–0	Castiadas
(G) Budoni	0–2	Cynthia
(H) San Severo	2–2 (a.e.t.)	Serpentara
(I) Leonfortese	0–1	Gelbison Cilento
(I) Marsala	1–3 (a.e.t.)	Palmese
