= 2016–17 Serie D =

Serie D
- Season: 2016–17
- Champions: Monza
- Promoted: 11 clubs
- Relegated: 33 clubs

The 2016–17 Serie D was the sixty-ninth edition of the top level Italian non-professional football championship. It represents the fourth tier in the Italian football league system. A total of 162 teams, divided on geographical grounds into 9 groups of 18 teams each, competed. Compared to the previous season there were nine teams less, as no team was admitted "supernumerary".

== Girone A ==
=== Teams ===
9 Teams from Piedmont and 9 teams from Lombardy

Club	City	Stadium	Capacity	2015–16 season
Borgosesia	Borgosesia	Comunale	2,500	13th in Serie D Girone A
Bra	Bra	Attilio Bravi	830	12th in Serie D Girone A
Bustese	Busto Garolfo	Roberto Battaglia		15th in Serie D Girone B
Caronnese	Caronno Pertusella	Comunale	1,000	2nd in Serie D Girone A
Casale	Casale Monferrato	Natale Palli	5,600	1st in Eccellenza Piedmont Girone B
Chieri	Chieri	Piero De Paoli	3,000	4th in Serie D Girone A
Cuneo	Cuneo	Fratelli Paschiero	3,060	16th in Lega Pro Girone A
Folgore Caratese	Carate Brianza	XXV Aprile	3,000	8th in Serie D Girone B
Gozzano	Gozzano	Alfredo D'Albertas	4,000	6th in Serie D Girone A
Inveruno	Inveruno	Comunale	600	7th in Serie D Girone B
Legnano	Legnano	Giovanni Mari	5,000	2nd in Eccellenza Lombardy Girone A
OltrepòVoghera	Stradella & Voghera	Giovanni Parisi	4,000	10th in Serie D Girone A
Pinerolo	Pinerolo	Luigi Barbieri	2,000	8th in Serie D Girone A
Pro Sesto	Sesto San Giovanni	Breda	4,500	15th in Serie D Girone B
Pro Settimo & Eureka	Settimo Torinese	Renzo Valla	900	11th in Serie D Girone A
Varese	Varese	Franco Ossola	9,424	1st in Eccellenza Lombardy Girone A
Varesina	Venegono Superiore & Castiglione Olona	Comunale		13th in Serie D Girone B
Verbania	Verbania	Carlo Pedroli	3,000	1st in Eccellenza Piedmont Girone A

=== League table ===
Pos	Team	Pld	W	D	L	GF	GA	GD	Pts	Promotion or relegation
1	Cuneo (P)	34	18	12	4	49	28	+21	66	2017–18 Serie C
2	Varese	34	19	6	9	48	30	+18	63	Qualification for Honorific play-off
3	Borgosesia	34	16	14	4	49	22	+27	62	Qualification for Honorific play-off
4	Gozzano (O)	34	17	8	9	58	37	+21	59	Qualification for Honorific play-off
5	Caronnese	34	16	11	7	55	38	+17	59	Qualification for Honorific play-off
6	Inveruno	34	17	8	9	71	51	+20	59	
7	Chieri	34	16	7	11	65	47	+18	55	
8	Pro Sesto	34	13	15	6	42	35	+7	54	
9	Casale	34	12	12	10	40	40	0	48	
10	Folgore Caratese	34	11	8	15	45	47	−2	41	
11	Bra	34	9	14	11	43	42	+1	41	
12	Oltrepò Voghera	34	9	11	14	42	57	−15	38	
13	Varesina	34	8	10	16	39	61	−22	34	Qualification for Relegation play-off
14	Bustese	34	7	10	17	37	54	−17	31	Qualification for Relegation play-off
15	Legnano (R)	34	8	7	19	34	61	−27	31	Qualification for Relegation play-off
16	Verbania (R)	34	7	9	18	36	56	−20	30	Qualification for Relegation play-off
17	Pinerolo (R)	34	6	10	18	38	61	−23	28	2017–18 Eccellenza
18	Pro Settimo & Eureka (R)	34	4	14	16	28	52	−24	26	2017–18 Eccellenza

Rules for classification: 1) points; 2) goal difference; 3) number of goals scored.
(O) Play-off winners; (P) Promoted; (R) Relegated

== Girone B ==
=== Teams ===
15 teams from Lombardy and 3 teams from Trentino-Alto Adige

Club	City	Stadium	Capacity	2015–16 season
Caravaggio	Caravaggio	Comunale	3,000	17th in Serie D Girone B
Cavenago Fanfulla	Lodi	Dossenina	2,184	3rd in Eccellenza Lombardy Girone B
Ciliverghe Mazzano	Mazzano	Sterilgarda		5th in Serie D Girone B
Ciserano	Ciserano	Comunale C.Rossoni		9th in Serie D Girone B
Darfo Boario	Darfo Boario Terme	Comunale	1,200	1st in Eccellenza Lombardy Girone C
Dro	Dro	Comunale Oltra	500	10th in Serie D Girone C
Grumellese	Grumello del Monte	Luciano Libico		12th in Serie D Girone B
Lecco	Lecco	Rigamonti-Ceppi	4,977	2nd in Serie D Girone B
Levico	Levico Terme	Comunale		11th in Serie D Girone C
Monza	Monza	Brianteo	18,568	10th in Serie D Girone B
Olginatese	Olginate	Comunale	1,000	6th in Serie D Girone B
Pergolettese	Crema	Giuseppe Voltini	4,100	14th in Serie D Girone B
Pontisola	Ponte San Pietro, Terno d'Isola & Chignolo d'Isola	Matteo Legler	2,000	4th in Serie D Girone B
Pro Patria	Busto Arsizio	Carlo Speroni	4,627	18th in Lega Pro Girone A
Scanzorosciate	Scanzorosciate	Comunale		1st in Eccellenza Lombardy Girone B
Seregno	Seregno	Ferruccio	3,700	3rd in Serie D Girone B
Virtus Bergamo	Alzano & Seriate	Carillo Pesenti Pigna	1,900	16th in Serie D Girone B
Virtus Bolzano	Bolzano	Druso	4,040	1st in Eccellenza Trentino

=== League table ===
Pos	Team	Pld	W	D	L	GF	GA	GD	Pts	Promotion or relegation
1	Monza (C, P)	34	24	8	2	70	17	+53	80	2017–18 Serie C
2	Ciliverghe Mazzano (O)	34	22	7	5	75	45	+30	73	Qualification for Honorific play-off
3	Pergolettese	34	20	5	9	58	38	+20	65	Qualification for Honorific play-off
4	Virtus Bergamo	34	18	9	7	57	34	+23	63	Qualification for Honorific play-off
5	Pro Patria	34	19	5	10	50	34	+16	62	Qualification for Honorific play-off
6	Pontisola	34	17	8	9	59	37	+22	59	
7	Darfo Boario	34	16	6	12	46	38	+8	54	
8	Caravaggio	34	12	11	11	45	48	−3	47	
9	Seregno	34	11	12	11	51	49	+2	45	
10	Grumellese	34	12	6	16	37	51	−14	42	
11	Ciserano	34	12	4	18	44	54	−10	40	
12	Dro	34	9	9	16	33	48	−15	36	
13	Olginatese	34	10	6	18	39	56	−17	36	Qualification for Relegation play-off
14	Scanzorosciate	34	10	4	20	30	61	−31	34	Qualification for Relegation play-off
15	Levico	34	7	10	17	42	53	−11	31	Qualification for Relegation play-off
16	Lecco	34	9	4	21	31	64	−33	31	Qualification for Relegation play-off
17	Virtus Bolzano (R)	34	8	5	21	31	54	−23	29	2017–18 Eccellenza
18	Cavenago Fanfulla (R)	34	6	9	19	38	55	−17	27	2017–18 Eccellenza

Rules for classification: 1) points; 2) goal difference; 3) number of goals scored.
(C) Champions; (O) Play-off winners; (P) Promoted; (R) Relegated

== Girone C ==
=== Teams ===
15 teams from Veneto and 3 teams from Friuli-Venezia Giulia

Club	City	Stadium	Capacity	2015–16 season
Abano	Abano Terme	Delle Terme	1,000	9th in Serie D Girone C
Altovicentino	Valdagno & Marano Vicentino	Dei Fiori	6,000	2nd in Serie D Girone D
Belluno	Belluno	Polisportivo	2,585	4th in Serie D Girone C
Calvi Noale	Noale	Azzurri d'Italia 2006		12th in Serie D Girone C
Campodarsego	Campodarsego	Aldo e Dino Ballarin	3,622	2nd in Serie D Girone C
Cordenons	Cordenons	Comunale Assi		1st in Eccellenza Friuli
Este	Este, Veneto	Nuovo		3rd in Serie D Girone C
Legnago	Legnago	Mario Sandrini	2,152	2nd in Serie D Girone D
Mestre	Mestre	Comunale di Mogliano Veneto		8th in Serie D Girone C
Montebelluna	Montebelluna	San Vigilio	2,000	15th in Serie D Girone C
Pievigina	Pieve di Soligo	Comunale	1,500	1st in Eccellenza Veneto Girone B
Tamai	Brugnera	Comunale	1,000	7th in Serie D Girone C
Triestina	Trieste	Nereo Rocco	32,454	16th in Serie D Girone C
Union Arzignano Chiampo	Arzignano & Chiampo	Tommaso Dal Molin	2,000	11th in Serie D Girone D
Union Feltre	Feltre	Libero Zugni Tauro		13th in Serie D Girone C
Vigasio	Vigasio	Comunale Ugo Capone		2nd in Eccellenza Veneto Girone A
Vigontina San Paolo	Vigonza	Comunale		6th in Serie D Girone C
Virtus Verona	Verona	M.Gavagnin - S.Nocini	1,200	5th in Serie D Girone C

=== League table ===
Pos	Team	Pld	W	D	L	GF	GA	GD	Pts	Promotion or relegation
1	Mestre (P)	34	25	5	4	73	34	+39	80	2017–18 Serie C
2	Triestina (O, P)	34	21	9	4	63	33	+30	72	Qualification for Honorific play-off
3	Campodarsego	34	17	9	8	55	42	+13	60	Qualification for Honorific play-off
4	Virtus Verona	34	14	11	9	42	30	+12	53	Qualification for Honorific play-off
5	Abano	34	13	14	7	46	38	+8	53	Qualification for Honorific play-off
6	Belluno	34	13	11	10	40	36	+4	50	
7	Union Arzignano Chiampo	34	13	10	11	43	34	+9	49	
8	Montebelluna	34	12	8	14	46	54	−8	44	
9	Este	34	10	13	11	33	33	0	43	
10	Union Feltre	34	11	10	13	35	37	−2	43	
11	Legnago	34	10	11	13	46	43	+3	41	
12	Altovicentino (R)	34	11	7	16	45	55	−10	40	Bankruptcy
13	Calvi Noale	34	11	7	16	44	45	−1	40	Qualification for Relegation play-off
14	Tamai	34	11	7	16	33	45	−12	40	Qualification for Relegation play-off
15	Cordenons (R)	34	10	9	15	44	56	−12	39	Qualification for Relegation play-off
16	Vigasio (R)	34	9	11	14	42	61	−19	38	Qualification for Relegation play-off
17	Vigontina San Paolo (R)	34	4	13	17	42	62	−20	25	2017–18 Eccellenza
18	Pievigina (R)	34	6	5	23	29	63	−34	23	2017–18 Eccellenza

Rules for classification: 1) points; 2) goal difference; 3) number of goals scored.
(O) Play-off winners; (P) Promoted; (R) Relegated

== Girone D ==
=== Teams ===
9 teams from Emilia-Romagna, 7 teams from Tuscany and 2 teams from Veneto

Club	City	Stadium	Capacity	2015–16 season
Adriese	Adria	Luigi Bettinazzi	2,200	1st in Eccellenza Veneto Girone A
Castelvetro	Castelvetro di Modena	William Venturelli		1st in Eccellenza Emilia Romagna Girone A
Colligiana	Colle Val d'Elsa	Gino Manni	2,000	5th in Serie D Girone E
Correggese	Correggio	Walter Borelli	1,500	5th in Serie D Girone D
Delta Rovigo	Rovigo	Stadio Francesco Gabrielli	3,000	7th in Serie D Girone D
Fiorenzuola	Fiorenzuola d'Arda	Comunale	4,000	19th in Serie D Girone B
Imolese	Imola	Romeo Galli	4,000	6th in Serie D Girone D
Lentigione	Brescello	Valente Levantini		9th in Serie D Girone D
Mezzolara	Budrio	Pietro Zucchini	1,300	16th in Serie D Girone D
Pianese	Piancastagnaio	Comunale	1,000	11th in Serie D Girone E
Poggibonsi	Poggibonsi	Stefano Lotti	2,513	4th in Serie D Girone E
Ravenna	Ravenna	Bruno Benelli	12,020	13th in Serie D Girone D
Ribelle	Castiglione di Ravenna	Massimo Sbrighi	1,000	8th in Serie D Girone D
Rignanese	Rignano sull'Arno	Comunale		1st in Eccellenza Tuscany
San Donato Tavarnelle	Tavarnelle Val di Pesa	Gino Manni (Colle Val d'Elsa)	2,000	2nd in Eccellenza Tuscany
Sangiovannese	San Giovanni Valdarno	Virgilio Fedini	3,800	9th in Serie D Girone E
Scandicci	Scandicci	Comunale Turri	1,800	14th in Serie D Girone E
Virtus Castelfranco	Castelfranco Emilia	Fausto Ferrarini	1,280	15th in Serie D Girone D

=== League table ===
Pos	Team	Pld	W	D	L	GF	GA	GD	Pts	Promotion or relegation
1	Ravenna (P)	34	17	14	3	52	26	+26	65	2017–18 Serie C
2	Imolese (O)	34	18	9	7	60	35	+25	63	Qualification for Honorific play-off
3	Delta Rovigo	34	17	10	7	57	37	+20	61	Qualification for Honorific play-off
4	Lentigione	34	16	10	8	40	31	+9	58	Qualification for Honorific play-off
5	Correggese	34	16	8	10	58	48	+10	56	Qualification for Honorific play-off
6	Castelvetro	34	15	5	14	60	57	+3	50	
7	Scandicci	34	13	7	14	45	55	−10	46	
8	Pianese	34	12	10	12	46	48	−2	46	
9	Mezzolara	34	11	12	11	44	46	−2	45	
10	Rignanese	34	11	11	12	34	35	−1	44	
11	San Donato Tavarnelle	34	11	11	12	50	48	+2	44	
12	Fiorenzuola	34	12	7	15	39	45	−6	43	
13	Colligiana	34	10	13	11	46	47	−1	43	Qualification for Relegation play-off
14	Adriese	34	11	6	17	46	51	−5	39	Qualification for Relegation play-off
15	Ribelle (R)	34	8	15	11	45	46	−1	39	Qualification for Relegation play-off
16	Sangiovannese	34	10	7	17	42	51	−9	37	Qualification for Relegation play-off
17	Virtus Castelfranco (R)	34	8	9	17	25	41	−16	33	2017–18 Eccellenza
18	Poggibonsi (R)	34	6	4	24	24	66	−42	22	2017–18 Eccellenza

Rules for classification: 1) points; 2) goal difference; 3) number of goals scored.
(O) Play-off winners; (P) Promoted; (R) Relegated

== Girone E ==
=== Teams ===
9 teams from Liguria and 9 teams from Tuscany

Club	City	Stadium	Capacity	2015–16 season
Argentina	Arma di Taggia	Ezio Sclavi		5th in Serie D Girone A
Fezzanese	Porto Venere	Miro Luperi (Sarzana)		17th in Serie D Girone A
FBC Finale	Finale Ligure	Edoardo Riboli		1st in Eccellenza Liguria
Gavorrano	Gavorrano	Romeo Malservisi	2,000	12th in Serie D Girone E
Ghivizzano Borgoamozzano	Coreglia Antelminelli & Borgo a Mozzano	Carraia		9th in Serie D Girone F
Grosseto	Grosseto	Carlo Zecchini	10,200	2nd in Serie D Girone G
Jolly Montemurlo	Montemurlo	Aldo Nelli	400	9th in Serie D Girone E
Lavagnese	Lavagna	Edoardo Riboli	1,250	3rd in Serie D Girone A
Ligorna	Genoa	Ligorna "A"		15th in Serie D Girone A
Massese	Massa	degli Oliveti	11,500	5th in Serie D Girone E
Ponsacco	Ponsacco	Comunale	3,220	4th in Serie D Girone E
Real Forte Querceta	Forte dei Marmi	Necchi Balloni		1st in Eccellenza Tuscany Girone A
Sanremese	Sanremo	Comunale	4,000	2nd in Eccellenza Liguria
Savona	Savona	Velerio Bacigalupo	4,000	18th in Lega Pro Girone B
Sestri Levante	Sestri Levante	Giuseppe Sivori	1,500	7th in Serie D Girone A
Sporting Recco	Recco	San Rocco		9th in Serie D Girone A
Valdinievole Montecatini	Montecatini Terme	Daniele Mariotti	4,600	2nd in Serie D Girone E
Viareggio 2014	Viareggio	Torquato Bresciani	7,000	12th in Serie D Girone E

=== League table ===
Pos	Team	Pld	W	D	L	GF	GA	GD	Pts	Promotion or relegation
1	Gavorrano (P)	34	20	10	4	64	36	+28	70	2017–18 Serie C
2	Massese (O)	34	19	7	8	59	37	+22	64	Qualification for Honorific play-off
3	Savona	34	18	8	8	58	31	+27	62	Qualification for Honorific play-off
4	Lavagnese	34	18	7	9	58	40	+18	61	Qualification for Honorific play-off
5	FBC Finale	34	14	11	9	52	46	+6	53	Qualification for Honorific play-off
6	Sanremese	34	12	14	8	50	34	+16	50	
7	Ponsacco	34	13	9	12	46	45	+1	48	
8	Argentina	34	13	9	12	42	35	+7	48	
9	Real Forte Querceta	34	12	11	11	52	41	+11	47	
10	Valdinievole Montecatini	34	13	7	14	40	44	−4	46	
11	Ligorna	34	10	16	8	54	56	−2	46	
12	Sestri Levante	34	11	8	15	46	46	0	41	
13	Jolly Montemurlo (R)	34	9	14	11	34	35	−1	41	Qualification for Relegation play-off
14	Fezzanese (R)	34	9	12	13	40	52	−12	39	Qualification for Relegation play-off
15	Viareggio 2014	34	10	8	16	43	59	−16	38	Qualification for Relegation play-off
16	Ghivizzano Borgoamozzano	34	8	10	16	43	53	−10	34	Qualification for Relegation play-off
17	Sporting Recco (R)	34	7	6	21	36	64	−28	27	2017–18 Eccellenza
18	Grosseto (R)	34	3	7	24	27	90	−63	16	2017–18 Eccellenza

Rules for classification: 1) points; 2) goal difference; 3) number of goals scored.
(O) Play-off winners; (P) Promoted; (R) Relegated

== Girone F ==
=== Teams ===
8 teams from Marche, 4 teams from Abruzzo, 3 teams from Emilia-Romagna, 2 teams from Molise and 1 team from San Marino

Club	City	Stadium	Capacity	2015–16 season
Alfonsine	Alfonsine	Comunale		1st in Eccellenza Emilia Romagna Girone B
Campobasso	Campobasso	Romagnoli	4,000	3rd in Serie D Girone F
Castelfidardo	Castelfidardo	G. Mancini	2,000	12th in Serie D Girone F
Chieti	Chieti	Guido Angelini	12,750	6th in Serie D Girone F
Civitanovese	Civitanova Marche	Comunale	4,000	1st in Eccellenza Marche
Fermana	Fermo	Bruno Recchioni	9,500	5th in Serie D Girone F
Jesina	Jesi	Pacifico Carotti	5,000	8th in Serie D Girone F
Matelica	Matelica	Giovanni Paolo II	500	4th in Serie D Girone F
Monticelli	Ascoli Piceno	Cino e Lillo Del Duca	10,887	14th in Serie D Girone F
Olympia Agnonese	Agnone	Civitelle	4,000	13th in Serie D Girone F
Pineto	Pineto	Mimmo Pavone	1,000	3rd in Eccellenza Abruzzo
Recanatese	Recanati	Nicola Tubaldi	2,000	7th in Serie D Girone F
Romagna Centro	Cesena	Dino Manuzzi	23,860	14th in Serie D Girone D
Sammaurese	San Mauro Pascoli	Macrelli	700	10th in Serie D Girone D
San Marino	Serravalle	San Marino	4,877	4th in Serie D Girone D
San Nicolò	San Nicolò a Tordino	Gaetano Bonolis (Teramo)	7,498	9th in Serie D Girone F
Vastese	Vasto	Aragona	5,374	1st in Eccellenza Abruzzo
Vis Pesaro	Pesaro	Tonino Benelli	5,000	11th in Serie D Girone F

=== League table ===
Pos	Team	Pld	W	D	L	GF	GA	GD	Pts	Promotion or relegation
1	Fermana (P)	32	21	6	5	51	28	+23	69	2017–18 Serie C
2	Matelica	32	19	6	7	56	30	+26	63	Qualification for Honorific play-off
3	San Nicolò	32	16	12	4	53	29	+24	60	Qualification for Honorific play-off
4	Vis Pesaro (O)	32	14	11	7	47	32	+15	53	Qualification for Honorific play-off
5	Olympia Agnonese	32	13	12	7	45	33	+12	51	Qualification for Honorific play-off
6	Sammaurese	32	14	8	10	37	25	+12	50	
7	Monticelli	32	11	14	7	37	33	+4	47	
8	Vastese	32	12	9	11	43	32	+11	45	
9	San Marino	32	10	11	11	43	38	+5	41	
10	Jesina	32	11	7	14	35	44	−9	40	
11	Romagna Centro	32	10	9	13	34	41	−7	39	
12	Pineto	32	10	9	13	35	44	−9	39	
13	Campobasso	32	10	8	14	32	44	−12	38	
14	Alfonsine (R)	32	7	9	16	33	45	−12	30	Qualification for Relegation play-off
15	Castelfidardo	32	7	7	18	28	44	−16	28	Qualification for Relegation play-off
16	Recanatese	32	5	12	15	30	50	−20	27	Re-admitted
17	Civitanovese (R)	32	3	8	21	22	69	−47	17	2017–18 Eccellenza
18	Chieti (R)	0	0	0	0	0	0	0	0	Withdrew and folded

Rules for classification: 1) points; 2) goal difference; 3) number of goals scored.
(O) Play-off winners; (P) Promoted; (R) Relegated

== Girone G ==
=== Teams ===
7 teams from Sardinia, 5 teams from Lazio, 3 teams from Umbria, 2 teams from Abruzzo and 1 team from Tuscany

Club	City	Stadium	Capacity	2015–16 season
Albalonga	Albano Laziale	Pio XII	1,500	7th in Serie D Girone G
Arzachena	Arzachena	Biagio Pirina	3,100	6th in Serie D Girone G
Avezzano	Avezzano	dei Marsi	3,692	10th in Serie D Girone F
Città di Castello	Città di Castello	Corrado Bernicchi	1,000	13th in Serie D Girone E
Flaminia	Civita Castellana	Turrido Madani	1,300	9th in Serie D Girone G
Foligno	Foligno	Enzo Blasone	5,650	8th in Serie D Girone E
L'Aquila	L'Aquila	Gran Sasso d'Italia	7,000	16th in Lega Pro Girone B
Lanusei	Lanusei	Lixius		13th in Serie D Girone G
Latte Dolce	Sassari	Vanni Sanna	5,821	1st in Eccellenza Sardinia
Muravera	Muravera	Comunale		12th in Serie D Girone G
Nuorese	Nuoro	Franco Frogheri	7,000	8th in Serie D Girone G
Nuova Monterosi	Monterosi	Marcello Martoni		1st in Eccellenza Lazio Girone A
Ostia Mare	Ostia	Anco Marzio	1,000	10th in Serie D Girone G
Rieti	Rieti	Centro d'Italia – Manlio Scopigno	9,980	4th in Serie D Girone G
San Teodoro	San Teodoro	Comunale		2nd in Eccellenza Sardinia
Sansepolcro	Sansepolcro	Comunale Buitoni	2,000	16th in Serie D Girone E
Trestina	Trestina	Lorenzo Casini		1st in Eccellenza Umbria
Torres	Sassari	Vanni Sanna	5,821	3rd in Serie D Girone G

=== League table ===
Pos	Team	Pld	W	D	L	GF	GA	GD	Pts	Promotion or relegation
1	Arzachena (P)	34	22	8	4	62	21	+41	74	2017–18 Serie C
2	Nuova Monterosi	34	22	7	5	69	22	+47	73	Qualification for Honorific play-off
3	Rieti (O)	34	22	5	7	67	29	+38	71	Qualification for Honorific play-off
4	Ostia Mare	34	18	9	7	59	33	+26	63	Qualification for Honorific play-off
5	L'Aquila	34	16	15	3	57	27	+30	63	Qualification for Honorific play-off
6	Nuorese	34	16	10	8	43	33	+10	58	
7	Albalonga	34	15	10	9	59	42	+17	55	
8	Avezzano	34	13	7	14	42	36	+6	46	
9	Sansepolcro	34	13	7	14	50	47	+3	46	
10	Flaminia	34	12	9	13	48	41	+7	45	
11	Lanusei	34	14	2	18	45	52	−7	44	
12	Trestina	34	11	10	13	46	44	+2	43	
13	Latte Dolce	34	9	8	17	30	47	−17	35	
14	San Teodoro	34	8	7	19	32	57	−25	31	Qualification for Relegation play-off
15	Muravera (R)	34	7	9	18	24	51	−27	30	Qualification for Relegation play-off
16	Torres (R)	34	6	10	18	23	58	−35	28	2017–18 Eccellenza
17	Città di Castello (R)	34	5	9	20	25	64	−39	24	2017–18 Eccellenza
18	Foligno (R)	34	3	6	25	15	92	−77	15	2017–18 Eccellenza

Rules for classification: 1) points; 2) goal difference; 3) number of goals scored.
(O) Play-off winners; (P) Promoted; (R) Relegated

== Girone H ==
=== Teams ===
6 teams from Apulia, 4 teams from Basilicata, 4 teams from Campania and 4 teams from Lazio

Club	City	Stadium	Capacity	2015–16 season
Agropoli	Agropoli	Raffaele Guariglia	2,000	13th in Serie D Girone I
Anziolavinio	Anzio	Massimo Burschini	3,000	2nd in Eccellenza Lazio Girone B
AZ Picerno	Picerno	Donato Curcio		16th in Serie D Girone H
Bisceglie	Bisceglie	Gustavo Ventura	5,000	8th in Serie D Girone H
Città di Ciampino	Ciampino	Comunale Superga		1st in Eccellenza Lazio Girone B
Cynthia	Genzano di Roma	Comunale	4,500	15th in Serie D Girone G
Francavilla	Francavilla in Sinni	Nunzio Fittipaldi	1,200	3rd in Serie D Girone H
Gelbison	Vallo della Lucania	Giovanni Morra	4,000	17th in Serie D Girone I
Gravina	Gravina in Puglia	Stefano Vicino		1st in Eccellenza Apulia
Herculaneum	Ercolano	Raffaele Solaro	1,300	1st in Eccellenza Campania Girone A
Madre Pietra Daunia	Castelnuovo della Daunia	Madre Pietra (Apricena)		1st in Eccellenza Molise
Manfredonia	Manfredonia	Miramare	4,076	6th in Serie D Girone H
Nardò	Nardò	Giovanni Paolo II	5,000	4th in Serie D Girone H
Nocerina	Nocera Inferiore	San Francesco	9,068	1st in Eccellenza Campania Girone B
Potenza	Potenza	Alfredo Viviani	5,500	12th in Serie D Girone H
San Severo	San Severo	Ricciardelli	300	14th in Serie D Girone H
Trastevere	Rome	Trastevere		11th in Serie D Girone G
Vultur Rionero	Rionero in Vulture	Pasquale Corona		1st in Eccellenza Basilicata

=== League table ===
Pos	Team	Pld	W	D	L	GF	GA	GD	Pts	Promotion or relegation
1	Bisceglie (P)	34	23	8	3	67	31	+36	77	2017–18 Serie C
2	Trastevere	34	22	7	5	60	32	+28	73	Qualification for Honorific play-off
3	Nocerina (O)	34	19	7	8	62	31	+31	64	Qualification for Honorific play-off
4	Gravina	34	17	10	7	45	23	+22	61	Qualification for Honorific play-off
5	Nardò	34	18	6	10	49	36	+13	60	Qualification for Honorific play-off
6	Gelbison	34	13	8	13	50	44	+6	47	
7	AZ Picerno	34	12	11	11	42	37	+5	47	
8	Potenza	34	11	12	11	43	44	−1	45	
9	Manfredonia	34	12	8	14	50	53	−3	44	
10	San Severo	34	10	13	11	45	42	+3	43	
11	Francavilla	34	11	10	13	34	38	−4	43	
12	Herculaneum	34	10	13	11	33	37	−4	43	
13	Anziolavinio	34	9	14	11	42	49	−7	41	
14	Vultur Rionero (R)	34	8	14	12	37	44	−7	38	Qualification for Relegation play-off
15	Madre Pietra Daunia	34	10	8	16	43	57	−14	38	Qualification for Relegation play-off
16	Agropoli (R)	34	7	7	20	38	70	−32	28	2017–18 Eccellenza
17	Cynthia (R)	34	6	4	24	31	59	−28	22	2017–18 Eccellenza
18	Città di Ciampino (R)	34	4	8	22	37	81	−44	20	2017–18 Eccellenza

Rules for classification: 1) points; 2) goal difference; 3) number of goals scored.
(O) Play-off winners; (P) Promoted; (R) Relegated

== Girone I ==
=== Teams ===
8 teams from Campania, 5 teams from Calabria and 5 teams from Sicily

Club	City	Stadium	Capacity	2015–16 season
Aversa Normanna	Aversa	Augusto Bisceglia	2,555	6th in Serie D Girone I
Castrovillari	Castrovillari	Mimmo Rende	4,000	2nd in Eccellenza Calabria
Cavese	Cava de' Tirreni	Simonetta Lamberti	5,200	3rd in Serie D Girone I
Due Torri	Piraino	Enzo Vasi	3,800	7th in Serie D Girone I
Frattese	Frattamaggiore	Pasquale Ianniello	5,000	2nd in Serie D Girone I
Gela	Gela	Vincenzo Presti	4,200	1st in Eccellenza Sicily Girone A
Gladiator	Santa Maria Capua Vetere	Mario Piccirillo	2,000	12th in Eccellenza Campania Girone A
Gragnano	Gragnano	San Michele	2,000	10th in Serie D Girone I
Igea Virtus	Barcellona Pozzo di Gotto	Carlo Stagno d'Alcontres	7,000	1st in Eccellenza Sicily Girone B
Palmese	Palmi	Giuseppe Lopresti	2,500	16th in Serie D Girone I
Pomigliano	Pomigliano d'Arco	Ugo Gobbato	1,600	7th in Serie D Girone H
Rende	Rende	Marco Lorenzon	5,000	11th in Serie D Girone I
Roccella	Roccella Ionica	Ninetto Muscolo	2,000	8th in Serie D Girone I
Sancataldese	San Cataldo	Valentino Mazzola		2nd in Eccellenza Sicily Girone A
Sarnese	Sarno	Felice Squitieri	3,246	9th in Serie D Girone I
Sersale	Sersale	Ferrarizzi		1st in Eccellenza Calabria
Sicula Leonzio	Lentini	Angelino Nobile	2,500	3rd in Eccellenza Sicily Girone B
Turris	Torre del Greco	Amerigo Liguori	5,300	13th in Serie D Girone H

=== League table ===
Pos	Team	Pld	W	D	L	GF	GA	GD	Pts	Promotion or relegation
1	Sicula Leonzio (P)	34	24	4	6	58	28	+30	76	2017–18 Serie C
2	Cavese	34	20	6	8	54	28	+26	66	Qualification for Honorific play-off
3	Rende (O, P)	34	20	6	8	56	34	+22	66	Qualification for Honorific play-off
4	Igea Virtus	34	19	8	7	55	30	+25	65	Qualification for Honorific play-off
5	Gela	34	16	8	10	51	37	+14	56	Qualification for Honorific play-off
6	Palmese	34	17	8	9	57	40	+17	59	
7	Frattese	34	15	8	11	62	41	+21	53	
8	Turris	34	15	5	14	47	42	+5	50	
9	Gladiator (R)	34	13	9	12	43	47	−4	48	Bankruptcy
10	Pomigliano	34	11	13	10	42	36	+6	46	
11	Gragnano	34	10	15	9	48	39	+9	45	
12	Aversa Normanna	34	10	13	11	36	39	−3	43	
13	Sancataldese	34	12	6	16	36	51	−15	42	
14	Roccella	34	11	6	17	44	55	−11	39	Qualification for Relegation play-off
15	Castrovillari (R)	34	7	11	16	39	47	−8	32	2017–18 Eccellenza
16	Sarnese	34	8	8	18	28	49	−21	32	Qualification for Relegation play-off
17	Sersale (R)	34	2	7	25	26	69	−43	13	2017–18 Eccellenza
18	Due Torri (R)	34	3	3	28	9	79	−70	12	2017–18 Eccellenza

Rules for classification: 1) points; 2) goal difference; 3) number of goals scored.
(O) Play-off winners; (P) Promoted; (R) Relegated

== Scudetto Serie D ==
The nine group winners enter a tournament which determines the overall Serie D champions and the winner is awarded the Scudetto Serie D.

=== First round ===
- division winners placed into 3 groups of 3
- group winners and best second-placed team qualify for semi-finals
- rank in Discipline Cup and head-to-head will break a tie or ties in points for the top position in a group
- Listed in order in Discipline Cup: Gavorrano, Monza, Mestre, Cuneo, Ravenna, Arzachena, Sicula Leonzio, Fermana, Bisceglie.

Group 1
Team	Pld	W	D	L	GF	GA	GD	Pts
Monza	2	2	0	0	5	1	+4	6
Mestre	2	1	0	1	3	4	−1	3
Cuneo	2	0	0	2	1	4	−3	0

14 May 2017, 15:00
Mestre (C)	2–1	Cuneo (A)	Mestre
20 May 2017, 15:00
Cuneo (A)	0–2	Monza (B)	Cuneo
24 May 2017, 16:00
Monza (B)	3–1	Mestre (C)	Monza

Group 2
Team	Pld	W	D	L	GF	GA	GD	Pts
Ravenna	2	1	1	0	2	1	+1	4
Fermana	2	1	0	1	3	3	0	3
Gavorrano	2	0	1	1	3	4	−1	1

13 May 2017, 20:30
Fermana (F)	0–1	Ravenna (D)	Fermo
21 May 2017, 16:00
Gavorrano (E)	2–3	Fermana (F)	Gavorrano
24 May 2017, 16:00
Ravenna (D)	1–1	Gavorrano (E)	Ravenna

Group 3
Team	Pld	W	D	L	GF	GA	GD	Pts
Sicula Leonzio	2	1	1	0	3	1	+2	4
Bisceglie	2	1	1	0	3	1	+2	4
Arzachena	2	0	0	2	0	4	−4	0

14 May 2017, 16:00
Arzachena (G)	0–2	Bisceglie (H)	Arzachena
21 May 2017, 16:00
Sicula Leonzio (I)	2–0	Arzachena (G)	Lentini
24 May 2017, 16:00
Bisceglie (H)	1–1	Sicula Leonzio (I)	Bisceglie

=== Semi-finals ===
- On neutral ground.

31 May 2017, 17:00
Sicula Leonzio (I)	0-1	Monza (B)	Monte San Giusto
31 May 2017, 20:30
Bisceglie (H)	2-2	Ravenna (D)	Fermo

=== Final ===
- On neutral ground.

4 June 2017, 21:00
Monza	2-1	Ravenna	Fermo

Scudetto winners: Monza

== Promotions ==
The nine group winners are automatically promoted to Serie C.

== Honorific play-off ==
Teams placed between second and fifth in each group enter a playoff tournament after the regular season. The tournament provides a priority list for entry into the next year Lega Pro in the case any of the professional teams fail to meet the minimum criteria to participate.

Rules

- The two rounds were one-legged matches played in the home field of the best-placed team.
- The games ending in ties were extended to extra time. The higher classified team was declared the winner if the game was still tied after extra time. Penalty kicks were not taken.
- Round one matched 2nd & 5th-placed teams and 3rd & 4th-placed teams within each division.
- The two winners from each division played each other in the second round.
- The tournament results provide a list, starting with the winner, by which vacancies could be filled in Serie C.
- If the winner is not admitted to this league it gets €30,000, while the replacement (the finalist) instead gets €15,000.

First round

- Single-legged matches played at best-placed club's home field: the 2nd-placed team plays the 5th-placed team at home, the 3rd-placed team plays the 4th placed team at home
- Games ending in a tie are extended to extra time; if still tied, the higher-classified team wins

Team 1	Score	Team 2
Varese (A2)	1–0	Caronnese (A5)
Borgosesia (A3)	1–2	Gozzano (A4)
Ciliverghe Mazzano (B2)	2–1	Pro Patria (B5)
Pergolettese (B3)	1–2	Virtus Bergamo (B4)
Triestina (C2)	1–1 (a.e.t.)	Abano (C5)
Campodarsego (C3)	0–2 (a.e.t.)	Virtus Verona (C4)
Imolese (D2)	3–3 (a.e.t.)	Correggese (D5)
Delta Rovigo (D3)	1–1 (a.e.t.)	Lentigione (D4)
Massese (E2)	2–1	FBC Finale (E5)
Savona (E3)	1–0	Lavagnese (E4)
Matelica (F2)	1–3	Olympia Agnonese (F5)
San Nicolò (F3)	0–1	Vis Pesaro (F4)
Nuova Monterosi (G2)	2–3	L'Aquila (G5)
Rieti (G3)	3–1	Ostia Mare (G4)
Trastevere (H2)	3–1 (a.e.t.)	Nardò (H5)
Nocerina (H3)	4–1	Gravina (H4)
Rende (I2)	2–1	Gela (I5)
Cavese (I3)	0–0 (a.e.t.)	Igea Virtus (I4)

Second round

- Single-legged matches played at best-placed club's home field
- Games ending in a tie are extended to extra time; if still tied, the higher-classified team wins

Team 1	Score	Team 2
Varese (A2)	0–2	Gozzano (A4)
Ciliverghe Mazzano (B2)	2–1	Virtus Bergamo (B4)
Triestina (C2)	1–1 (a.e.t.)	Virtus Verona (C4)
Imolese (D2)	1–0	Delta Rovigo (D3)
Massese (E2)	2–1	Savona (E3)
Vis Pesaro (F4)	1–1 (a.e.t.)	Olympia Agnonese (F5)
Rieti (G3)	4–1	L'Aquila (G5)
Trastevere (H2)	0–2	Nocerina (H3)
Rende (I2)	2–1	Cavese (I3)

Later admitted to Serie C: Triestina and Rende.

== Relegations ==
The bottom three teams of each group are relegated into next year's Eccellenza (the highest tier in regional football in Italy), while teams placed 14th and 15th face each other in a single leg play-out (team places 14th playing home), the loser of the tie is relegated.

=== Play-Off ===
- Single-legged matches played on best-placed club's home ground
- In case of tied score, extra time is played; if score is still level, best-placed team wins

Team 1	Score	Team 2
(A) Varesina	2–1 (a.e.t.)	Verbania
(A) Bustese	3–0	Legnano
(B) Olginatese	2–3	Lecco
(B) Scanzorosciate	1–1 (a.e.t.)	Levico
(C) Calvi Noale	0–0 (a.e.t.)	Vigasio
(C) Tamai	1–0	Cordenons
(D) Colligiana	2–1	Sangiovannese
(D) Adriese	3–1	Ribelle
(E) Jolly Montemurlo	0–2 (a.e.t.)	Ghivizzano Borgoamozzano
(E) Fezzanese	1–2	Viareggio 2014
(F) Alfonsine	0–1	Castelfidardo
(G) San Teodoro	2–2 (a.e.t.)	Muravera
(H) Vultur Rionero	0–1	Madre Pietra Daunia
(I) Roccella	0–1	Sarnese

Levico, Olginatese, Sangiovannese and Roccella later re-admitted.
