= 2016–17 Lega Pro =

Lega Pro
- Season: 2016–17
- Dates: 27 August 2016 – 17 June 2017
- Champions: Cremonese; Venezia; Foggia; Parma (playoffs)
- Relegated: Como (excluded); Tuttocuoio; Lupa Roma; Racing Roma; Macerata (excluded); Mantova (excluded); Forlì; Lumezzane; Ancona; Messina (excluded); Vibonese; Melfi; Taranto
- Matches played: 1,191
- Goals scored: 2,761 (2.32 per match)
- Top goalscorer: Leonardo Mancuso (25 goals)
- Biggest home win: Matera 6–0 Melfi (17 December 2016); Pordenone 6–0 Bassano (27 February 2017); Carrarese 6–0 Racing Roma (11 March 2017); Teramo 6–0 Gubbio (19 March 2017)
- Biggest away win: Racing Roma 0–4 Siena (9 October 2016); Reggina 2–6 Matera (23 October 2016); Gubbio 1–5 Teramo (29 October 2016); Pontedera 0–4 Cremonese (6 November 2016); Carrarese 0–4 Giana Eminio (23 December 2016); Melfi 0–4 Paganese (25 February 2017); Matera 0–4 Siracusa (25 February 2017); Monopoli 2–6 Cosenza (5 April 2017); Taranto 0–4 Paganese (19 April 2017)
- Highest scoring: Pordenone 7–2 Lumezzane (25 March 2017)
- Longest winning run: Foggia (10 matches)
- Longest unbeaten run: Alessandria (20 matches)
- Longest winless run: Monopoli (15 matches)
- Longest losing run: Melfi (11 matches)
- Highest attendance: 17,358; Reggiana 0–2 Parma (19 December 2016)
- Lowest attendance: 95; Racing Roma 1–0 Prato (4 September 2016)
- Total attendance: 2,860,673
- Average attendance: 2,412

The 2016–17 Lega Pro Divisione Unica was the third season of the unified Lega Pro division, the third highest division in the Italian football league system. The championship name, which is Divisione Unica according to the FIGC regulations, is nevertheless referred to as Lega Pro in official documents. The season marked the final year that the division would carry the Lega Pro name as it was changed back to Serie C for the 2017–18 season.

== Teams ==
A total of 60 teams contest the league. Clubs include 4 sides relegated from the 2015–16 Serie B season, 41 sides playing the 2015–16 Lega Pro season, and 9 sides promoted from the 2015–16 Serie D season. Also, six teams are chosen to play in the league to increase the number of teams to 60.

On 1 July 2016, 54 teams mathematically qualified to the new season. However, Martina Franca and Sporting Bellinzago did not submit their application for a licence. On 6 July also Virtus Lanciano did not meet the requirements to apply. On 16 July Pavia and Rimini did not submit an appeal against Covisoc's exclusion. On 19 July Paganese's appeal of exclusion was rejected by Covisod. However, on 3 August Paganese was readmitted to the league by TAR's decision. On 4 August the Federal Council selected ten teams in order to fill the vacancies created: Fano (as a replacement for Sporting Bellizango), Fondi, Forlì, Lupa Roma, Melfi, Olbia, Racing Roma, Reggina, Taranto and Vibonese. On 10 August Albinoleffe was the last team to benefit from the repechage.

=== Stadia and locations ===
Note: Table lists in alphabetical order.

==== Group A (North & Central West) ====
9 teams from Tuscany, 4 teams from Lombardy, 3 teams from Lazio, 2 teams from Emilia-Romagna, 1 team from Piedmont and 1 team from Sardinia

Club	City	Stadium	Capacity
Alessandria	Alessandria	Giuseppe Moccagatta	5,827
Arezzo	Arezzo	Città di Arezzo	13,128
Carrarese	Carrara	Dei Marmi	15,000
Cremonese	Cremona	Giovanni Zini	20,641
Como	Como	Giuseppe Sinigaglia	13,602
Giana Erminio	Gorgonzola	Città di Gorgonzola	3,766
Livorno	Livorno	Armando Picchi	19,238
Lucchese	Lucca	Porta Elisa	7,386
Lupa Roma	Rome	Olindo Galli (Tivoli)	3,500
Olbia	Olbia	Bruno Nespoli	3,200
Piacenza	Piacenza	Leonardo Garilli	21,668
Pistoiese	Pistoia	Marcello Melani	13,195
Pontedera	Pontedera	Ettore Mannucci	5,000
Prato	Prato	Lungobisenzio	6,750
Pro Piacenza	Piacenza	Leonardo Garilli	21,668
Racing Roma	Rome	Casal del Marmo	2,500
Renate	Renate	Città di Meda (Meda)	3,000
Robur Siena	Siena	Montepaschi Arena	15,373
Tuttocuoio	San Miniato	Ettore Mannucci (Pontedera)	5,000
Viterbese	Viterbo	Enrico Rocchi	5,500

Location of teams in Lega Pro (Group A) 2016–17
Location of teams in 2016–17 Serie C (Group A) (Tuscany)

==== Group B (North & Central East) ====
5 teams from Emilia-Romagna, 4 teams from Lombardy, 4 teams from Marche, 3 teams from Veneto, 1 team from Abruzzo, 1 team from Friuli-Venezia Giulia, 1 team from Trentino-Alto Adige and 1 team from Umbria

Location of teams in Lega Pro (Group B) 2016–17
Location of teams in 2016–17 Serie C (Group B) (Emilia-Romagna)
Location of teams in 2016–17 Serie C (Group B) (Lombardy)

Club	City	Stadium	Capacity
AlbinoLeffe	Albino and Leffe	Atleti Azzurri d'Italia (Bergamo)	26,542
Ancona	Ancona	del Conero	23,983
Bassano Virtus	Bassano del Grappa	Rino Mercante	2,952
Fano	Fano	Raffaele Mancini	8,800
FeralpiSalò	Salò	Lino Turina	2,500
Forlì	Forlì	Tullo Morgagni	3,466
Gubbio	Gubbio	Pietro Barbetti	5,300
Lumezzane	Lumezzane	Nuovo Comunale	4,150
Maceratese	Macerata	Helvia Recina	5,846
Mantova	Mantua	Danilo Martelli	14,884
Modena	Modena	Alberto Braglia	21,151
Padova	Padua	Euganeo	19,740
Parma	Parma	Stadio Ennio Tardini	27,906
Pordenone	Pordenone	Ottavio Bottecchia	3,000
Reggiana	Reggio Emilia	Città del Tricolore	20,084
Sambenedettese	San Benedetto del Tronto	Riviera delle Palme	14,995
Santarcangelo	Santarcangelo di Romagna	Valentino Mazzola	3,000
Südtirol	Bolzano	Druso	3,500
Teramo	Teramo	Gaetano Bonolis	7,498
Venezia	Venice	Pier Luigi Penzo	7,450

==== Group C (South) ====
6 teams from Apulia, 4 teams from Calabria, 4 teams from Sicily, 3 teams from Campania, 2 teams from Basilicata and 1 team from Lazio

Location of teams in Lega Pro (Group C) 2016–17
Location of teams in 2016–17 Serie C (Group C) (Campania)
Location of teams in 2016–17 Serie C (Group C) (Apulia)

Club	City	Stadium	Capacity
Akragas	Agrigento	Esseneto	15,000
Casertana	Caserta	Alberto Pinto	12,000
Catania	Catania	Angelo Massimino	20,266
Catanzaro	Catanzaro	Nicola Ceravolo	14,650
Cosenza	Cosenza	San Vito	24,479
Fidelis Andria	Andria	Degli Ulivi	9,140
Foggia	Foggia	Pino Zaccheria	25,000
Fondi	Fondi	Domenico Purificato	2,500
Juve Stabia	Castellammare di Stabia	Romeo Menti	7,642
Lecce	Lecce	Via del Mare	33,876
Matera	Matera	Franco Salerno	8,500
Melfi	Melfi	Arturo Valerio	4,100
Messina	Messina	San Filippo	37,895
Monopoli	Monopoli	Vito Simone Veneziani	6,880
Paganese	Pagani	Marcello Torre	5,900
Reggina	Reggio Calabria	Oreste Granillo	27,454
Siracusa	Siracusa	Nicola De Simone	6,870
Taranto	Taranto	Erasmo Iacovone	27,584
Vibonese	Vibo Valentia	Luigi Razza	6,000
Virtus Francavilla	Francavilla Fontana	Giovanni Paolo II	5,000

== League Tables ==
=== Group A (North & Central West) ===
Pos	Team	Pld	W	D	L	GF	GA	GD	Pts	Promotion, qualification or relegation
1	Cremonese (P)	38	24	6	8	68	40	+28	78	Promotion to Serie B
2	Alessandria	38	23	9	6	64	33	+31	78	Qualification to the promotion play-offs
3	Livorno	38	19	12	7	51	30	+21	69	Qualification to the promotion play-offs
4	Arezzo	38	18	11	9	50	38	+12	65	Qualification to the promotion play-offs
5	Giana Erminio	38	17	12	9	56	43	+13	63	Qualification to the promotion play-offs
6	Piacenza	38	17	10	11	56	41	+15	61	Qualification to the promotion play-offs
7	Como (Note: Following the acquisition of the club by F.C. Como S.r.l., a company owned by Akosua Puni Essien, which purchased the club from the bankrupt Calcio Como S.r.l., Essien failed to either settle the club's debts or post a surety by the 28 June 2017 deadline. Consequently, FIGC revoked the membership of Calcio Como S.r.l. and rejected the application by F.C. Como S.r.l. to have the club's sporting title attributed to it, and Lega Pro expelled the club.) (E, R)	38	15	14	9	55	49	+6	59	Relegation to Serie D
8	Viterbese	38	14	12	12	43	42	+1	54	Qualification to the promotion play-offs
9	Lucchese (Note: Lucchese was deducted 2 points for financial reasons.)	38	13	14	11	47	39	+8	51	Qualification to the promotion play-offs
10	Renate	38	12	15	11	36	36	0	51	Qualification to the promotion play-offs
11	Pro Piacenza	38	15	6	17	40	42	−2	51	
12	Siena	38	13	6	19	45	49	−4	45	
13	Pistoiese (Note: Pistoiese was deducted 1 point in relation to Dirty Soccer 3 case.)	38	10	14	14	42	43	−1	43	
14	Pontedera	38	9	16	13	38	50	−12	43	
15	Olbia	38	12	6	20	43	59	−16	42	
16	Carrarese (O)	38	10	9	19	44	54	−10	39	Qualification to the relegation play-outs
17	Prato (O)	38	11	6	21	35	59	−24	39	Qualification to the relegation play-outs
18	Tuttocuoio (R)	38	9	11	18	37	53	−16	38	Qualification to the relegation play-outs
19	Lupa Roma (R)	38	7	12	19	28	48	−20	33	Qualification to the relegation play-outs
20	Racing Roma (R)	38	7	9	22	38	68	−30	30	Relegation to Serie D

Updated to match(es) played on 12 May 2017. Source: Soccerway
(E) Eliminated; (O) Play-off winners; (P) Promoted; (R) Relegated

=== Group B (North & Central East) ===
Pos	Team	Pld	W	D	L	GF	GA	GD	Pts	Promotion, qualification or relegation
1	Venezia (P)	38	23	11	4	56	29	+27	80	Promotion to Serie B
2	Parma (O, P)	38	20	10	8	55	36	+19	70	Qualification to the promotion play-offs
3	Pordenone	38	19	9	10	68	42	+26	66	Qualification to the promotion play-offs
4	Padova	38	19	9	10	50	31	+19	66	Qualification to the promotion play-offs
5	Reggiana	38	16	11	11	43	36	+7	59	Qualification to the promotion play-offs
6	Gubbio	38	17	7	14	44	49	−5	58	Qualification to the promotion play-offs
7	Sambenedettese	38	15	11	12	53	47	+6	56	Qualification to the promotion play-offs
8	FeralpiSalò	38	15	8	15	47	45	+2	53	Qualification to the promotion play-offs
9	Albinoleffe	38	12	16	10	38	34	+4	52	Qualification to the promotion play-offs
10	Bassano Virtus	38	13	12	13	48	52	−4	51	Qualification to the promotion play-offs
11	Santarcangelo (Note: Santarcangelo was deducted 2 points in relation to Dirty Soccer 3 case.)	38	13	13	12	44	39	+5	50	
12	Südtirol	38	12	11	15	33	40	−7	47	
13	Maceratese (Note: Maceratese was deducted 3 points for financial reasons and additional 2 points for administrative reasons. Maceratese failed to submit its surety by the 5 July 2017 deadline and were expelled by Lega Pro.) (R)	38	12	14	12	36	40	−4	45	Relegation to Serie D
14	Modena	38	11	11	16	31	35	−4	44	
15	Mantova (Note: Mantova failed to submit its surety by the 5 July 2017 deadline and were expelled by Lega Pro.) (R)	38	10	11	17	37	50	−13	41	Relegation to Serie D
16	Teramo (O)	38	9	13	16	39	43	−4	40	Qualification to the relegation play-outs
17	Fano (O)	38	9	12	17	32	42	−10	39	Qualification to the relegation play-outs
18	Forlì (R)	38	8	13	17	32	55	−23	37	Qualification to the relegation play-outs
19	Lumezzane (R)	38	7	13	18	26	44	−18	34	Qualification to the relegation play-outs
20	Ancona (Note: Ancona was deducted 1 point for administrative reasons.) (R)	38	7	11	20	28	47	−19	31	Relegation to Serie D

Updated to match(es) played on 12 May 2017. Source: Lega Pro
(O) Play-off winners; (P) Promoted; (R) Relegated

=== Group C (South) ===
Pos	Team	Pld	W	D	L	GF	GA	GD	Pts	Promotion, qualification or relegation
1	Foggia (C, P)	38	25	10	3	70	29	+41	85	Promotion to Serie B
2	Lecce	38	21	11	6	62	36	+26	74	Qualification to the promotion play-offs
3	Matera	38	18	11	9	71	44	+27	65	Qualification to the promotion play-offs
4	Juve Stabia	38	18	10	10	65	43	+22	64	Qualification to the promotion play-offs
5	Virtus Francavilla	38	16	9	13	47	45	+2	57	Qualification to the promotion play-offs
6	Siracusa	38	16	9	13	47	43	+4	57	Qualification to the promotion play-offs
7	Cosenza	38	15	10	13	57	46	+11	55	Qualification to the promotion play-offs
8	Paganese (Note: Paganese was deducted 1 point in relation to Dirty Soccer 3 case.)	38	14	9	15	51	45	+6	50	Qualification to the promotion play-offs
9	Casertana (Note: Casertana was deducted 2 points for financial reasons.)	38	13	12	13	38	42	−4	49	Qualification to the promotion play-offs
10	Fondi (Note: Fondi was deducted 1 point for financial reasons.)	38	11	17	10	49	46	+3	49	Qualification to the promotion play-offs
11	Catania (Note: Catania was deducted 7 points for late payments.)	38	14	12	12	40	36	+4	47	Qualification to the promotion play-offs
12	Fidelis Andria	38	10	17	11	30	33	−3	47	
13	Reggina	38	10	15	13	44	54	−10	45	
14	Messina (Note: Messina was deducted 2 points for administrative failures. Messina failed to submit its surety by the 5 July 2017 deadline and were expelled by Lega Pro.) (R)	38	12	10	16	38	52	−14	44	Relegation to Serie D
15	Monopoli	38	9	15	14	42	54	−12	42	
16	Akragas (O)	38	9	12	17	30	47	−17	39	Qualification to the relegation play-outs
17	Vibonese (R)	38	9	12	17	27	46	−19	39	Qualification to the relegation play-outs
18	Catanzaro (O)	38	9	11	18	36	49	−13	38	Qualification to the relegation play-outs
19	Melfi (Note: Melfi was deducted 1 point for misrepresentation.) (R)	38	9	8	21	38	68	−30	34	Qualification to the relegation play-outs
20	Taranto (R)	38	6	12	20	25	49	−24	30	Relegation to Serie D

Updated to match(es) played on 12 May 2017. Source: Lega Pro
(C) Champions; (O) Play-off winners; (P) Promoted; (R) Relegated

== Promotion play-offs ==
=== First round ===
Team 1	Score	Team 2
Gubbio	2–3	Sambenedettese
Arezzo	1-2	Lucchese
Padova	1–3	Albinoleffe
Juve Stabia^{1}	0–0	Catania
Livorno	2–1	Renate
Giana Erminio^{1}	2–2	Viterbese
Reggiana^{1}	2–2	FeralpiSalò
Virtus Francavilla^{1}	0–0	Fondi
Piacenza	2–1	Como
Pordenone	2–0	Bassano Virtus
Siracusa	0–2	Casertana
Cosenza	2–0	Paganese

^{1} Won by higher placed finish.

=== Second round ===
Team 1	Agg.	Team 2	1st leg	2nd leg
Giana Erminio	3–4	Pordenone	2–1	1–3
Reggiana	2–1	Juve Stabia	2–1	0–0
Virtus Francavilla	0–0	Livorno^{1}	0–0	0–0
Lucchese	1–0	Albinoleffe	1–0	0–0
Casertana	2–4	Alessandria	1–1	1–3
Sambenedettese	1–1	Lecce^{1}	1–1	0–0
Piacenza	0–2	Parma	0–0	0–2
Cosenza	3–2	Matera	2–1	1–1

^{1} Won by higher placed finish.

=== Final Eight ===
Quarterfinals on 31 May and 4 June 2017, semifinals on 13 and 14 June 2017, final on 17 June 2017.

Quarter-finals
Parma	2	2	4
Lucchese	1	1	2
Pordenone	1	0	1
Cosenza	0	0	0
Lecce	1	0	1
Alessandria (a)	1	0	1
Livorno	1	2	3
Reggiana	2	2	4

Semi-finals
Parma	2
Pordenone	1
Alessandria	2
Reggiana	1

Final
Parma	2
Alessandria	0

== Relegation play-outs ==
Play-outs on 21 and 28 May 2017, loser on aggregate is relegated. Higher placed team plays at home for second leg. If tied on aggregate, lower-placed team is relegated.

Team 1	Agg.	Team 2	1st leg	2nd leg
Lupa Roma	0–2	Carrarese	0–1	0–1
Tuttocuoio	2–2	Prato	2–2	0–0
Lumezzane	1–1	Teramo	1–1	0–0
Forlì	1–3	Fano	1–1	0–2
Melfi	1–1	Akragas	0–0	1–1
Catanzaro	4–3	Vibonese	3–2	1–1

== Top goalscorers ==
As of 17 June 2017

Rank	Player	Club	Goals
1	(Italy) Leonardo Mancuso^{3}	Sambenedettese	25
2	(Argentina) Pablo González^{2}	Alessandria	22
3	(Italy) Riccardo Bocalon^{1}	Alessandria	21
3	(Italy) Fabio Mazzeo	Foggia	21
5	(Morocco) Rachid Arma^{1}	Pordenone	18
5	(Italy) Salvatore Bruno^{1}	Giana Erminio	18
5	(Italy) Salvatore Caturano^{1}	Lecce	18
8	(Italy) Emanuele Calaiò^{2}	Parma	17
8	(Italy) Claudio de Sousa	Racing Roma	17
8	(Italy) Davide Moscardelli^{1}	Arezzo	17
8	(Italy) Maikol Negro^{1}	Matera	17

Note

^{1}Player scored 1 goal in the play-offs.
^{2}Player scored 2 goals in the play-offs.
^{3}Player scored 3 goals in the play-offs.

== Supercup ==
2017	Cremonese	1–2	Venezia	Stadio Giovanni Zini, Cremona
2017	Foggia	3–1	Cremonese	Stadio Pino Zaccheria, Foggia
2017	Venezia	2–4	Foggia	Stadio Pier Luigi Penzo, Venice
2017	Foggia (group C) won with 6 points at the top of the group
