= Elia Bortoluz =

Italian footballer (born 1997)

Personal information
- Date of birth: 29 March 1997 (age 29)
- Place of birth: Mestre, Italy
- Height: 1.93 m (6 ft 4 in)
- Position: Forward

Team information
- Current team: Villa Valle
- Number: 9

Youth career
- Cittadella
- 2015–2016: Torino
- 2016: → Vicenza (loan)

Senior career*
Years	Team	Apps	(Gls)
2016–2018	Pro Patria	44	(11)
2018–2022	Pergolettese	56	(12)
2022–2023	Villa Valle	0	(0)
2023–	A.C. Mestre	0	(0)
- * Club domestic league appearances and goals as of 15 July 2023

Elia Bortoluz (born 29 March 1997) is an Italian professional footballer who plays as a forward for Serie D club Villa Valle.

== Club career ==
Born in Mestre, Bortoluz started his career on Cittadella, and Torino youth system.

He joined to Serie D club Pro Patria for the 2016–17 season, and won the 2017–18 Serie D with the club.

On 24 July 2018, Bortoluz signed with Serie D club Pergolettese.

On 9 July 2022, Bortoluz moved to Serie D club Villa Valle. On 15 July 2023, Bortoluz moved to Serie D A.C. Mestre.

== Honours ==
Pro Patria

- Serie D: 2017–18

Pergolettese

- Serie D (Group D): 2018–19
