= Ermes Purro =

Italian footballer (born 1999)

Personal information
- Date of birth: 17 June 1999 (age 27)
- Place of birth: Massa, Italy
- Height: 1.81 m (5 ft 11 in)
- Position: Defender

Team information
- Current team: Poggibonsi
- Number: 23

Youth career
- Fiorentina

Senior career*
Years	Team	Apps	(Gls)
2018–2019	Lavagnese	27	(2)
2019–2020	Ravenna	21	(1)
2020–2022	Lecco	14	(1)
2023	Real Forte Querceta	11	(0)
2023–	Poggibonsi	2	(0)
- * Club domestic league appearances and goals as of 20 December 2023

Ermes Purro (born 17 June 1999) is an Italian professional footballer who plays as a defender for Serie D club Poggibonsi.

== Club career ==
Born in Massa, Purro was formed on Fiorentina youth system. He made his senior debut for Serie D club Lavagnese. On 11 July 2019 he joined to Serie C club Ravenna.

On 11 September 2020, Purro signed for Serie C club Lecco. His contract with Lecco was terminated by mutual consent on 21 December 2022.
