= Giovanni Catanese =

Italian footballer

Personal information
- Full name: Giovanni Marco Catanese
- Date of birth: 3 January 1993 (age 33)
- Place of birth: Reggio Calabria, Italy
- Height: 1.82 m (6 ft 0 in)
- Position: Midfielder

Youth career
- Reggina

Senior career*
Years	Team	Apps	(Gls)
2012–2014	Reggina	0	(0)
2012–2013	→ Vigor Lamezia (loan)	25	(4)
2013–2014	→ Cuneo (loan)	12	(1)
2014	→ Tuttocuoio (loan)	11	(2)
2014–2015	Potenza	29	(1)
2015–2016	Leonfortese	30	(5)
2016	Foligno	12	(2)
2016–2017	Ghivizzano Borgoamozzano	19	(1)
2017–2020	Pianese	88	(15)
2020–2024	Pontedera	114	(17)
2024	Arezzo	17	(1)
2024–2025	Lucchese	28	(0)
- * Club domestic league appearances and goals as of 27 April 2025

Giovanni Catanese (born 3 January 1993) is an Italian footballer who plays as a midfielder.

== Career ==
Born in Reggio Calabria, Catanese started his career in Reggina youth sector.

In July 2012, he was loaned to Lega Pro Seconda Divisione club Vigor Lamezia. Catanese made his professional debut on 2 September 2012 against Follonica Gavorrano.

The next 2013–2014 season, he was loaned again to Cuneo. On 18 January 2014, he was loaned to Tuttocuoio for the rest of season.

Catanese left Regiina in 2014, and signed with Serie D club Potenza. He also played for Leonfortese, Foligno and Ghivizzano Borgoamozzano in the four tier.

On 11 June 2017 he joined to Pianese in Serie D. In the club, Catanese won the promotion to Serie C for the 2019–20 season, and he made his Serie C debut on 25 August 2019 against Pro Vercelli.

On 23 July 2020, he signed with Serie C club Pontedera.

On 13 January 2024, Catanese left Pontedera joining on an free transfert to the other Serie C side Arezzo.
