= Bellinzago =

Bellinzago may refer to:

- Bellinzago Lombardo, a municipality in the Province of Milan
- Bellinzago Novarese, a municipality in the Province of Novara in the Italian Piedmont region
  - F.C.D. Sporting Bellinzago
