= Rossoblù =

Rossoblù (red-blues) may refer to several Italian football sides:

- Bologna F.C. 1909
- Cagliari Calcio
- Cosenza Calcio
- F.C. Crotone
- Cuoiopelli Cappiano Romaiano
- Genoa C.F.C.
- A.S. Gubbio 1910
- L'Aquila Calcio
- A.C. Lumezzane
- Modica Calcio
- Montevarchi Calcio Aquila 1902
- A.C. Montichiari
- A.S.C. Potenza
- F.C. Rieti
- Sambenedettese Calcio
- Sassari Torres 1903
- Taranto Sport
- Valenzana Calcio
