= ASD Polisportiva Calcio Budoni =

Italian football club

Budoni
- Full name: Associazione Sportiva Dilettantistica Polisportiva Calcio Budoni
- Founded: 1973; 53 years ago
- Ground: Stadio Comunale, Budoni, Italy
- Capacity: 1,500
- Chairman: Filippo Fois
- Manager: Gianluca Hervatin
- League: Serie D/G
- 2017–18: 10th
Home colours	Away colours

Associazione Sportiva Dilettantistica Polisportiva Calcio Budoni is an Italian association football club based in Budoni, Sardinia. Founded in 1973, tt currently plays in Serie D.

== History ==
The club was founded in 1973.

In the 2002–13 season it plays in Serie D for the 5th consecutive year.

== Colors and badge ==
The team's colors are white and light blue.
