= SSD Alba Alcamo 1928 =

Italian football club

Alcamo
- Full name: Società Sportiva Dilettantistica Alba Alcamo 1928
- Nickname(s): Bianconeri
- Founded: 1928
- Ground: Stadio Lelio Catella; Alcamo, Italy
- Capacity: 4,940
- Chairman: (Italy) Baldo Marchese
- League: Eccellenza Sicily – A
- 2018–19: Eccellenza Sicily – A, 6th
Home colours	Away colours

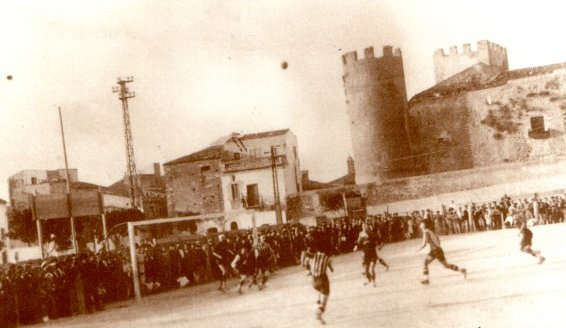
Alcamo football team during a match in 1928.

Società Sportiva Dilettantistica Alba Alcamo 1928 is an Italian association football club from Alcamo, Sicily.

The club was founded in 1928 and its official colours are black and white. Alcamo plays its home matches at Stadio Lelio Catella. The club also had a few appearances in the professional levels of Italian football, a single Serie C season in 1974–1975 and six consecutive Serie C2 campaigns from 1978–1979 to 1984–1985, with a third place in 1979 as its best result. The club also won a Coppa Italia Dilettanti in 1997.
