= SSD Argentina Arma =

Italian football club

Argentina
- Full name: Società Sportiva Dilettantistica Argentina Arma
- Founded: 1928
- Ground: Stadio Ezio Scalvi, Arma di Taggia, Italy
- Capacity: 1,010
- Chairman: Bruno Vellone
- Manager: Marcello Casu
- League: Serie D/A
- 2016-17: Serie D, 8th
Home colours	Away colours

Società Sportiva Dilettantistica Argentina Arma is an Italian football club, based in Arma di Taggia, Liguria. The team currently plays in Serie D and it is the team more representative of the province of Imperia with S.S.D. Unione Sanremo.

== History ==
The club was founded in 1928 as Arma Juve.

It was promoted for the first time to Serie D in the 2013–14 season, after winning the play-off of Eccellenza Liguria with A.S.D. Magra Azzurri and after an ascent started in Promozione in the 2012–13 season.

In the 2014–15 season, in its first league in Serie D, it was ranked 15th and then was saved.

In the 2015–16 and in the 2016–17 season also in Serie D it was ranked respectively 5th and 8th.

== Colors and badge ==
The colors of the team are red and black.

== Honours ==
- Eccellenza:
  - Winner (1): 2013–14
