= Eccellenza Sicily =

- Organising body: Lega Nazionale Dilettanti
- Founded: 1991
- Country: Italy
- Confederation: UEFA
- Divisions: 2
- Number of clubs: 32
- Promotion to: Serie D
- Relegation to: Promozione Sicily
- League cup: Coppa Italia Dilettanti
- Current champions: Athletic Club Palermo (Group A); Milazzo (Group B) (2024–25)
- Most championships: Marsala (4 titles)
- Website: http://www.lnd.it

Eccellenza Sicily (Italian: Eccellenza Sicilia) is the regional Italian Eccellenza football division for clubs in Sicily. It is competed among 32 teams in two groups (A and B). The winners of the Groups are promoted to Serie D. The clubs that finish second also have the chance to gain promotion. They are entered into a national play-off that consists of two rounds.

== Champions ==
Here are the past champions of the Sicilian Eccellenza, organized into their respective group.

=== Group A ===
- 1991–92 Vittoria
- 1992–93 Milazzo
- 1993–94 Gravina
- 1994–95 Nissa
- 1995–96 Orlandina
- 1996–97 Mazara
- 1997–98 Akragas
- 1998–99 Gattopardo
- 1999–2000 Panormus
- 2000–01 Pro Favara
- 2001–02 Marsala
- 2002–03 Fincantieri
- 2003–04 Folgore Castelvetrano
- 2004–05 Campobello
- 2005–06 Paternò
- 2006–07 Alcamo
- 2007–08 Nissa
- 2008–09 Mazara
- 2009–10 Marsala
- 2010–11 Licata
- 2011–12 Ribera
- 2012–13 Akragas
- 2013–14 Leonfortese
- 2014–15 Marsala
- 2015–16 Gela
- 2016–17 Paceco
- 2017–18 Marsala
- 2018–19 Licata
- 2019–20 Dattilo Noir
- 2020–21 Sancataldese
- 2021–22 Canicattì
- 2022–23 Akragas
- 2023–24 Nissa
- 2024–25 Athletic Club Palermo

=== Group B ===
- 1991–92 Partinico
- 1992–93 Bagheria
- 1993–94 Canicatti
- 1994–95 Caltagirone
- 1995–96 Peloro Messina
- 1996–97 Vittoria
- 1997–98 Siracusa
- 1998–99 Caltagirone
- 1999–2000 Paternò
- 2000–01 Belpasso
- 2001–02 Misterbianco
- 2002–03 Modica
- 2003–04 Giarre
- 2004–05 Comiso
- 2005–06 Licata
- 2006–07 Libertas Acate-Modica
- 2007–08 Castiglione
- 2008–09 Milazzo
- 2009–10 Acireale
- 2010–11 A.C. Palazzolo
- 2011–12 Ragusa
- 2012–13 Orlandina
- 2013–14 Tiger Brolo
- 2014–15 Città di Siracusa
- 2015–16 Igea Virtus
- 2016–17 S.C. Palazzolo
- 2017–18 Città di Messina
- 2018–19 Marina di Ragusa
- 2019–20 Paternò
- 2020–21 Giarre
- 2021–22 Ragusa
- 2022–23 Igea Virtus
- 2023–24 Enna
- 2024–25 Milazzo

== Current teams (2025–26) ==
=== Girone A ===
Club	City	Stadium	2024–25 season
90011 Bagheria	Bagheria	Comunale	Eccellenza A, 12th (as Casteldaccia)
Accademia Trapani	Trapani	Roberto Sorrentino	Eccellenza A, 7th
Bagheria	Bagheria	Comunale	Promozione A, 1st
Castellammare	Castellammare del Golfo	Giorgio Matranga	Eccellenza A, 10th
Città di San Vito Lo Capo	San Vito lo Capo	Comunale	Eccellenza A, 11th
CUS Palermo	Palermo	CUS Impianto Sportivo Universitario	Promozione A, 4th
Don Carlo Misilmeri	Misilmeri	Giovanni Aloisio	Eccellenza A, 5th
Folgore Castelvetrano	Castelvetrano	Paolo Marino	Eccellenza A, 9th
Kamarat	Cammarata	Vito Di Marco	Promozione C, 2nd
Licata	Licata	Dino Liotta	Serie D/I
Marsala	Marsala	Nino Lombardo Angotta	Eccellenza A, 6th
Montelepre	Montelepre	Don Pino Puglisi	Promozione A, 2nd
Parmonval	Partanna-Mondello, Palermo	Franco Lo Monaco	Eccellenza A, 8th
Partinicaudace	Partinico	S.S. Trinità	Eccellenza A, 15th
San Giorgio Piana	Piana degli Albanesi	Li Causi	Eccellenza A, 4th
Unitas Sciacca	Sciacca	Luigi Riccardo Gurrera	Eccellenza A, 3rd

=== Girone B ===
Club	City	Stadium	2024–25 season
Avola	Avola	Meno Di Pasquale	Eccellenza B, 4th
Polisportiva Gioiosa	Gioiosa Marea	Comunale	Eccellenza B, 7th
Atletico Catania 1994 Viagrande	Viagrande	Francesco Russo	Eccellenza B, 6th
Giarre	Giarre	Regionale	Promozione C, 1st
Leonxibet	Leonforte	Comunale	Eccellenza B, 10th (as Leonfortese)
Leonzio	Lentini	Angelino Nobile	Eccellenza B, 8th
Mazzarrone	Mazzarrone	Comunale	Eccellenza B, 13th
Messana 1966	Messina	Marullo	Promozione B, 1st
Modica	Modica	Vincenzo Barone	Eccellenza B, 2nd
Nebros	Acquedolci	Enzo Vasi (Gliaca, Piraino)	Eccellenza B, 5th
Niscemi	Niscemi	Santa Maria	Promozione D, 1st
Palazzolo	Palazzolo Acreide	Scrofani Salustro	Eccellenza B, 9th
Rosmarino	Militello Rosmarino	Nicolò Carosio (Capri Leone)	Eccellenza B, 11th
San Fratello Acquedolcese	Acquedolci and San Fratello	Comunale Latteri-Scaffidi (Acquedolci)	Promozione B, 2nd
Vittoria	Vittoria	Gianni Cosimo	Eccellenza B, 3rd
