= US Ciserano =

Italian football club

Ciserano
- Full name: Unione Sportiva Ciserano S.r.l.
- Founded: 1951
- Ground: Stadio Giacinto Facchetti; Cologno al Serio, Italy
- Chairman: (Italy) Olivo Foglieni
- Manager: (Italy) Alberto Simonelli
- League: Serie D/B
- 2017–18: 16th
| Home colours | Away colours |

Unione Sportiva Ciserano, commonly referred to as Ciserano, is an Italian football club based in Ciserano, Lombardy. Currently it plays in Italy's Serie D.

== History ==
=== Foundation ===
The club was founded in 1951.

=== Serie D ===
In the season 2013–14 the team was promoted, from Eccellenza Lombardy/B to Serie D.

== Colors and badge ==
The team's colors are red and blue.
