= ASD Socio Culturale Castiadas =

Italian football club

ASD Castiadas calcio
- Full name: Associazione Sportiva Dilettantistica Castiadas calcio
- Founded: 1973
- Ground: Stadio Comunale, Castiadas, Italy
- Capacity: 800
- Manager: Virgilio Perra
- League: Eccellenza
- 2018–19: Serie D girone G, 17 st
Home colours	Away colours

Associazione Sportiva Dilettantistica Castiadas calcio is an Italian association football club located in Castiadas, Sardinia. It plays in Eccellenza Regionale.
