= ASD Modica Calcio =

Italian football club

- Full name: Associazione Sportiva Dilettantistica Modica Calcio
- Nicknames: Rossoblù (The Red & Blue), Tigrotti (The Tigers)
- Founded: 1932; 94 years ago 1958 (refounded); 2006 (refounded); 2016 (refounded)
- Ground: Comunale Vincenzo Barone
- Capacity: 1,500
- Chairman: Mattia Pitino; Danilo Radenza
- Manager: Giuseppe Rizza
- Coach: Pasquale Ferrara
- League: Eccellenza Sicily
- 2023–24: Eccellenza Sicily, Group B, 3th of 16
- Website: www.modicacalcio.it
Home colours	Away colours

Associazione Sportiva Dilettantistica Modica Calcio, commonly known as ASD Modica Calcio or Modica Calcio (pronounced [ˈmɔːdika ˈkaltʃo]), is an Italian football club based in Modica, Sicily, who compete in Eccellenza Sicily, the fifth tier of the Italian football league system.

== History ==
The club Modica Calcio was founded in 1932 and has a long history in Italian non-league football. Modica played in Serie C2/C during the 2005–06, but was immediately relegated after playoffs and then cancelled because of financial irregularities. Successively, a new property bought Eccellenza club A.S.D. Pol. Libertas Acate from the neighbouring city of Acate; the new club, commonly referred to as Libertas Acate-Modica, won the Round B of Eccellenza Sicily league being therefore promoted to Serie D. The club was expected to reassume the original denomination from the following season, but this change was made effective only before the beginning of the 2009–10 season.

It in the season 2010–11, from Serie D group I relegated, in the play-out, to Eccellenza Sicily, where it plays in the current season.

== Honours ==
- Serie D
  - Champions (1): 2004–05 (Group I)
- Eccellenza Sicily
  - Champions (2): 2002–03 (Group B), 2006–07 (Group B)
- Promozione
  - Champions (5): 1972–73 (Group B), 1984–85 (Group B), 1994–95 (Group C), 1997–98 (Group C), 2021–22 (Group D)
- Prima Categoria
  - Champions (2): 1971–72, 2016–17 (Group F)
- Seconda Categoria
  - Champions (1): 1959–60
