= Siracusa Calcio =

Association football club in Italy

Siracusa
- Full name: Siracusa Calcio S.r.l.
- Nicknames: Azzurri (All-Blues); Aretusei
- Founded: 1954 (as Palazzolo); 2013 (rename)
- Dissolved: 2019
- Ground: Stadio Nicola De Simone, Syracuse
- Capacity: 5,946

Siracusa Calcio was an Italian football club founded in 2013. In 2019 the first team of the club was withdrawn from the professional leagues.

The club, originally known as A.C. Palazzolo A.S.D. relocated from Palazzolo Acreide to Syracuse in 2013, and took a new name Sport Club Siracusa (S.C. Siracusa). S.C. Siracusa replaced the 2013 folded club A.S.D. Città di Siracusa, an illegitimate phoenix club of U.S. Siracusa which itself was another illegitimate phoenix club of A.S. Siracusa. U.S. Siracusa and S.C. Siracusa had a derby in youth football in 2013–14 season. After the season S.C. Siracusa was renamed A.S.D. Città di Siracusa, and changed to Siracusa Calcio S.r.l. circa 2016. However, the club folded again in 2019, which the third A.S.D. Città di Siracusa was founded in 2019. The team was admitted to Promozione Sicily in August 2019.

== History ==
=== Palazzolo ===
The club located in Palazzolo Acreide, Sicily was founded in 1954 as Associazione Calcio Palazzolo Associazione Sportiva Dilettantistica.

In July 2006, Palazzolo was merged with A.S.D. Xiridia 96 Floridia, a football club from Floridia. (Note: Not to be confused this club (A.S.D. Xiridia 96 Floridia) from A.S.D. Floridia, another club that also named after the comune.)

Palazzolo took part in Serie D 3 times. The first participation in Serie D was in the 2007–08 season (as 2007 promotion playoffs winner) in which it was relegated the next year.

The club was promoted to the Serie D after winning the group B of Eccellenza Sicily in the 2010–11 season, but was relegated back in Eccellenza at the end of the 2012–13 Serie D season.

After the original club had relocated to Siracusa. The town of Palazzolo had re-founded another club S.C. Palazzolo.

=== Relocation to Siracusa ===
In 2013 Palazzolo (registration number: 917156) relocated to Syracuse as A.S.D. Sport Club Siracusa, in order to replace A.S.D. Città di Siracusa (reg.no.: 936289), which was an illegitimate phoenix club of U.S. Siracusa. At the same time, a new club was founded in Palazzolo Acreide as A.S.D. Sport Club Palazzolo (reg.no.: 937886), which played in Promozione, by splitting the FIGC membership of C.S.D. Enzo Grasso, a local Syracuse team now plays in 5-a-side football only. However, the usage of the historic logo of A.S. Siracusa 1924 by S.C. Siracusa, was denied by Amici del Siracusa, an association that currently owned the rights to use it.

S.C. Siracusa had a derby with U.S. Siracusa in the youth level in 2013–14 season, which the under-17 team of S.C. Siracusa finished as the second from the bottom in the Group E of Sicilian Allievi League. At the end of season the under-17 team relegated to provincial league, while U.S. Siracusa closed their youth department. The first team of S.C. Siracusa finished as the third place of the Group B of 2013–14 Eccellenza Sicily. The club lost to Misterbianco in the final of the promotion playoffs.

In 2014 S.C. Siracusa also renamed to A.S.D. Città di Siracusa, retaining the same registration number of S.C. Siracusa (and A.C. Palazzolo A.S.D.). The club won Eccellenza Sicily in 2015, after 2 seasons in the league.

New Siracusa promoted to Lega Pro at the end of 2015–16 Serie D as the Group I winner. The club was also incorporated as Siracusa Calcio S.r.l. circa 2016. However, after 3 seasons, new Siracusa failed to register for the new Serie C season and folded.

== Notable former players ==
- (Italy) Giuseppe Mascara, former Italian international footballer

== Honours ==
As A.C. Palazzolo A.S.D.

- Eccellenza Sicily:

- Winners (1): 2010–11

As A.S.D. Città di Siracusa / Siracusa Calcio

- Serie D:

- Winners (1): 2015–16 (group stage)

- Eccellenza Sicily:

- Winners (1): 2014–15
