= APD Leonfortese =

Italian football club

Leonfortese
- Full name: Associazione Polisportiva Dilettantistica Leonfortese
- Founded: 1967; 2016 (refounded)
- Ground: Stadio Comunale, Leonforte, Italy
- Capacity: 2,000
- Manager: Marco Russo
- Coach: Eugenio Lu Vito
- League: Eccellenza Sicily
- 2023–24: Eccellenza Sicily, Group B, 15th of 16
Home colours

Associazione Polisportiva Dilettantistica Leonfortese, commonly known as Leonfortese (pronounced [leonforˈteːze, -eːse]), is an Italian football club based in Leonforte, Sicily, who compete in Eccellenza Sicily, the fifth tier of the Italian football league system.

== History ==
In 2014, the club was promoted in Serie D for the first time in its history after being crowned Eccellenza Sicily champions by the end of the 2013–14 season. They played a total two seasons at the Serie D level, being relegated at the end of the 2015–16 Serie D campaign following a 0–1 relegation playoff loss to Gelbison. The club was successively excluded from Eccellenza and had to restart from Prima Categoria, returning to play Eccellenza only in 2022.
