= US Palmese 1912 =

Italian football club

Palmese
- Full name: Unione Sportiva Palmese 1912
- Nickname: Neroverdi
- Founded: 1912
- Ground: Stadio Giuseppe Lopresti, Palmi, Italy
- Capacity: 1,500
- Manager: Antonio Venuto
- League: Serie D/I
- 2017–18: 14th
Home colours	Away colours

The U.S. Palmese 1912 is a football club based in Palmi, Italy, founded in 1912. The team, whose colors are black and green, is one of the oldest in the football landscape of Calabria, and in the past has also played in the championships, the forerunner of today's Lega Pro, losing in 1935 with the Taranto and Andrea Doria finals for access to Serie B. It currently plays in Serie D.

== History ==
The Palmese was then enrolled in the professional leagues 3 Serie C. In those years, and after World War II, the Palmese faced in official matches of the season emblazoned formations of southern Italy affacciatesi at other times in Serie A, such as A.S. Bari, Reggina Calcio, Calcio Catania, Salernitana, Messina, U.S. Lecce and Catanzaro managing to get some prestigious results. Among them are the 0–1 victory in Bari, the home win against Catania 1–0 and always some victories against Reggina (at home with the results of 7–0 and 5–0 and at the Stadio Oreste Granillo of Reggio Calabria with the results of 0–4 and 2–4).

In addition, in 1934, the Palmese has played in Palmi two friendlies against AS Roma and AC Fiorentina.

The company has also participated in the 1938–39 Coppa Italia.
