= FCD Sporting Bellinzago =

Italian football club

Sporting Bellinzago
- Full name: Football Calcio Dilettantistica Sporting Bellinzago
- Founded: 2012
- Ground: Comunale, Bellinzago Novarese, Italy
- Capacity: 1,387
- Chairman: Massaro Antonio
- Manager: Siciliano Alessandro
- League: Serie D/A
- 2015–16: 1st (promoted)
Home colours	Away colours

Football Calcio Dilettantistica Sporting Bellinzago (or simply Sporting Bellinzago) was an Italian football club, based in Bellinzago Novarese, Piedmont.

== History ==
The club was founded in 2012.

It was promoted for the first time to Serie D in the 2013–14 season. It was promoted for the first time to Lega Pro in the 2015–2016 season, when it won the championship with 86 points but were denied because they didn’t submit their application for a licence.

== Colors and badge ==
The colors of the team are yellow and blue.
