= ASD Nerostellati Frattese =

Italian association football club

Nerostellati Frattese
- Full name: Associazione Sportiva Dilettantistica Nerostellati Frattese
- Founded: 2017
- Ground: Stadio Comunale Pasquale Ianniello, Frattamaggiore, Italy
- Capacity: 5,000
- Chairman: Antonio Schiano
- Manager: Teore Sossio Grimaldi
- League: Eccellenza
- 2013–14: Eccellenza Campania/A, 1st
Home colours	Away colours

Associazione Sportiva Dilettantistica Nerostellati Frattese or simply Frattese is an Italian association football club, based in Frattamaggiore Campania. It plays in Eccellenza.

== History ==
The club was founded in 2012 and played in Promozione Campania in the 2012–13 season, after buying Promozione's club Atletico Bosco sports title, when it was promoted to Eccellenza.

In the next season 2013–14 it was promoted to Serie D.

== Colors and badge ==
The team's color is black with a white star.

== Honours ==
- Eccellenza:
  - Winner (1): 2013–14
