= USD Lavagnese 1919 =

Italian football club

USD Lavagnese
- Full name: Unione Sportiva Dilettante Lavagnese 1919
- Founded: 1919; 107 years ago
- Ground: Stadio Edoardo Riboli, Lavagna, Italy
- Capacity: 1,250
- Chairman: Stefano Compagnoni
- Manager: Gianni Nucera
- League: Eccellenza
- 2025-26: Serie D, 19th (Relegated)
Home colours	Away colours

Unione Sportiva Dilettante Lavagnese 1919 is an Italian association football club located in Lavagna, Liguria. It currently plays in Eccellenza.

== History ==
=== Regional Serie C ===
Unione Sportiva Dilettanti Lavagnese was founded in 1919, but it was only in 1948 that reached the first milestone: third place in Serie C North Group B . According to the Regulation, the first team in each group, then became two after this season, he was entitled to entry into the new Serie C, managed by the National League: coming third, failed to reach a spot in the new league. From that moment began a dark period for Lavagnese, which was playing in minor categories such as Promozione and Prima Categoria.

=== Serie D ===
Since the season 2002–03 it plays in Serie D: the current is the 13th consecutive.

==== Serie D 2011–12 ====
In the 2011–12 season Lavagnese gained access to the Serie D promotion play-off advancing through to the 4th round, where it was eliminated by Cosenza.

== Colors and badge ==
Its colors are black and white.
