= 2017–18 Serie D =

Serie D
- Season: 2017–18
- Champions: Pro Patria

The 2017–18 Serie D was the seventieth edition of the top level Italian non-professional football championship. It represents the fourth tier in the Italian football league system. A total of 167 teams, divided on geographical grounds into 6 groups of 18 teams each, one of 19 teams and 2 of 20 teams.

== Girone A ==
=== League table ===
Pos	Team	Pld	W	D	L	GF	GA	GD	Pts	Promotion or relegation
1	Gozzano (P)	38	25	7	6	68	25	+43	82	Promoted to 2018–19 Serie C
2	Como (O, Q)	38	25	6	7	58	27	+31	81	Girone A playoffs
3	Caronnese (Q)	38	21	11	6	62	30	+32	74	Girone A playoffs
4	Calcio Chieri 1955 (Q)	38	19	14	5	64	37	+27	71	Girone A playoffs
5	Pro Sesto (Q)	38	20	7	11	69	43	+26	67	Girone A playoffs
6	Folgore Caratese	38	14	14	10	45	39	+6	56	
7	Inveruno	38	14	10	14	44	48	−4	52	
8	Borgosesia Calcio	38	14	9	15	40	39	+1	51	
9	Arconatese 1926	38	14	8	16	37	46	−9	50	
10	Bra	38	13	10	15	45	51	−6	49	
11	Pavia 1911	38	12	11	15	53	58	−5	47	
12	Borgaro Nobis 1965	38	11	13	14	35	44	−9	46	
13	Olginatese	38	9	18	11	37	44	−7	45	
14	Seregno Calcio	38	10	14	14	45	54	−9	44	
15	OltrepoVoghera (Q, O)	38	9	16	13	34	47	−13	43	Relegation playoffs
16	Casale (Q, O)	38	10	12	16	41	48	−7	42	Relegation playoffs
17	Varesina (Q, R)	38	10	11	17	33	45	−12	41	Relegation playoffs, relegated to 2018–19 Eccellenza
18	Varese Calcio (Q, R)	38	8	16	14	47	49	−2	40	Relegation playoffs, relegated to 2018–19 Eccellenza
19	Calcio Derthona (R)	38	5	11	22	25	62	−37	26	Relegated to 2018–19 Eccellenza
20	Castellazzo Bormida (R)	38	3	10	25	32	78	−46	19	Relegated to 2018–19 Eccellenza

Rules for classification: 1) points; 2) goal difference; 3) number of goals scored.
(O) Play-off winners; (P) Promoted; (Q) Qualified for the phase indicated; (R) Relegated

== Girone B ==
=== League table ===
Pos	Team	Pld	W	D	L	GF	GA	GD	Pts	Promotion or relegation
1	Pro Patria (P)	36	23	10	3	58	22	+36	79	Promoted to 2018–19 Serie C
2	Rezzato (Q)	36	24	6	6	84	35	+49	78	Girone B playoffs
3	Pontisola Calcio (Q)	36	21	7	8	67	44	+23	70	Girone B playoffs
4	Pergolettese 1932 (O, Q)	36	19	10	7	57	37	+20	67	Girone B playoffs
5	Darfo Boario (Q)	36	18	8	10	51	30	+21	62	Girone B playoffs
6	Virtus Bergamo 1909	36	18	4	14	57	46	+11	58	
7	Calcio Lecco 1912	36	16	10	10	46	35	+11	58	
8	Crema 1908	36	13	9	14	43	40	+3	48	
9	Bustese Milano City	36	12	11	13	44	43	+1	47	
10	Caravaggio	36	12	11	13	47	52	−5	47	
11	Ciliverghe Mazzano	36	12	9	15	47	46	+1	45	
12	Levico Terme	36	11	11	14	45	56	−11	44	
13	Trento	36	12	7	17	42	64	−22	43	
14	Scanzorosciate Calcio	36	12	7	17	41	51	−10	43	
15	Lumezzane (Q, R)	36	11	9	16	37	51	−14	42	Relegation playoffs, relegated to 2018–19 Eccellenza
16	Ciserano (Q, O)	36	8	12	16	42	58	−16	36	Relegation playoffs
17	Grumellese (R)	36	9	7	20	34	55	−21	34	Relegated to 2018–19 Eccellenza
18	Dro Alto Garda Calcio (R)	36	6	13	17	33	62	−29	31	Relegated to 2018–19 Eccellenza
19	Calcio Romanese (R)	36	2	5	29	30	78	−48	11	Relegated to 2018–19 Eccellenza

Rules for classification: 1) points; 2) goal difference; 3) number of goals scored.
(O) Play-off winners; (P) Promoted; (Q) Qualified for the phase indicated; (R) Relegated

== Girone C ==
=== League table ===
Pos	Team	Pld	W	D	L	GF	GA	GD	Pts	Promotion or relegation
1	Virtus Verona (P)	34	22	7	5	60	33	+27	73	Promoted to 2018–19 Serie C
2	Campodarsego (Q)	34	21	5	8	73	43	+30	68	Girone C playoffs
3	Arzignano Valchiampo (O, Q)	34	19	10	5	75	42	+33	67	Girone C playoffs
4	Mantova (Q)	34	17	9	8	56	34	+22	60	Girone C playoffs
5	Adriese (Q)	34	16	8	10	56	31	+25	56	Girone C playoffs
6	Este	34	15	11	8	49	29	+20	56	
7	Belluno 1905	34	15	6	13	62	50	+12	51	
8	Legnago Salus	34	13	10	11	53	47	+6	49	
9	Union Feltre	34	14	7	13	49	56	−7	49	
10	Delta Porto Tolle	34	13	8	13	47	50	−3	47	
11	Cjarlins Muzane	34	10	14	10	51	49	+2	44	
12	Clodiense Chioggia	34	10	11	13	44	60	−16	41	
13	Ambrosiana	34	11	7	16	51	64	−13	40	
14	Tamai	34	10	10	14	50	51	−1	40	
15	Calcio Montebelluna (R)	34	8	8	18	34	50	−16	32	Relegated to 2018–19 Eccellenza
16	Calvi Noale (R)	34	7	7	20	32	67	−35	28	Relegated to 2018–19 Eccellenza
17	Liventina (R)	34	5	10	19	33	64	−31	25	Relegated to 2018–19 Eccellenza
18	Abano Calcio (R)	34	4	4	26	25	80	−55	16	Relegated to 2018–19 Eccellenza

Rules for classification: 1) points; 2) goal difference; 3) number of goals scored.
(O) Play-off winners; (P) Promoted; (Q) Qualified for the phase indicated; (R) Relegated

== Girone D ==
=== League table ===
Pos	Team	Pld	W	D	L	GF	GA	GD	Pts	Promotion or relegation
1	Rimini (P)	38	23	11	4	65	38	+27	80	Promoted to 2018–19 Serie C
2	Imolese (O, P, Q)	38	21	8	9	72	45	+27	71	Girone D playoffs, promoted to 2018–19 Serie C
3	Forlì (Q)	38	18	11	9	60	43	+17	65	Girone D playoffs
4	Fiorenzuola 1922 (Q)	38	16	16	6	50	32	+18	64	Girone D playoffs
5	Sangiovannese 1927 (Q)	38	17	10	11	42	38	+4	61	Girone D playoffs
6	Lentigione Calcio	38	16	12	10	45	33	+12	60	
7	Villabiagio	38	17	8	13	52	49	+3	59	
8	Pianese	38	14	16	8	54	35	+19	58	
9	Aquila Montevarchi 1902	38	16	8	14	42	40	+2	56	
10	Romagna Centro	38	14	12	12	49	42	+7	54	
11	Sammaurese	38	14	12	12	34	29	+5	54	
12	Sasso Marconi 1924	38	11	12	15	35	48	−13	45	
13	Vigor Carpaneto 1922	38	9	18	11	50	48	+2	45	
14	Tuttocuoio 1957	38	10	12	16	25	34	−9	42	
15	Sporting Club Trestina	38	10	11	17	36	52	−16	41	
16	Castelvetro Calcio (Q, R)	38	10	8	20	46	62	−16	38	Relegation playoffs, relegated to 2018–19 Eccellenza
17	Mezzolara (Q, O)	38	7	15	16	34	50	−16	36	Relegation playoffs
18	Vivi Altotevere Sansepolcro (R)	38	7	12	19	40	62	−22	33	Relegated to 2018–19 Eccellenza
19	Correggese Calcio 1948 (R)	38	6	14	18	37	55	−18	32	Relegated to 2018–19 Eccellenza
20	Colligiana (R)	38	7	8	23	27	60	−33	29	Relegated to 2018–19 Eccellenza

Rules for classification: 1) points; 2) goal difference; 3) number of goals scored.
(O) Play-off winners; (P) Promoted; (Q) Qualified for the phase indicated; (R) Relegated

== Girone E ==
=== League table ===
Pos	Team	Pld	W	D	L	GF	GA	GD	Pts	Promotion or relegation
1	Albissola (P)	34	21	6	7	56	30	+26	69	Promoted to 2018–19 Serie C
2	Sanremese Calcio (Q)	34	20	7	7	58	34	+24	67	Girone E playoffs
3	Ponsacco 1920 (O, Q)	34	17	11	6	49	31	+18	62	Girone E playoffs
4	Real Forte Querceta (Q)	34	16	12	6	50	27	+23	60	Girone E playoffs
5	Viareggio 2014 (Q)	34	17	9	8	57	46	+11	58	Girone E playoffs
6	Massese 1919	34	15	11	8	50	33	+17	56	
7	Savona	34	16	7	11	53	34	+19	55	
8	Seravezza Pozzi Calcio	34	13	12	9	44	33	+11	51	
9	San Donato Tavarnelle	34	12	10	12	41	34	+7	46	
10	Ghivizzano Borgoamozzano	34	10	14	10	48	45	+3	44	
11	Ligorna 1922	34	11	10	13	41	50	−9	43	
12	Sestri Levante 1919	34	11	9	14	35	34	+1	42	
13	Lavagnese 1919	34	11	8	15	35	42	−7	41	
14	Rignanese (Q, R)	34	10	8	16	36	60	−24	38	Relegation playoffs, relegated to 2018–19 Eccellenza
15	Scandicci 1908 (Q, O)	34	10	4	20	42	54	−12	34	Relegation playoffs
16	Finale (R)	34	6	12	16	38	49	−11	30	Relegated to 2018–19 Eccellenza
17	Argentina (R)	34	4	9	21	29	71	−42	21	Relegated to 2018–19 Eccellenza
18	Valdinievole Montecatini (R)	34	2	9	23	19	74	−55	15	Relegated to 2018–19 Eccellenza

Rules for classification: 1) points; 2) goal difference; 3) number of goals scored.
(O) Play-off winners; (P) Promoted; (Q) Qualified for the phase indicated; (R) Relegated

== Girone F ==
=== League table ===
Pos	Team	Pld	W	D	L	GF	GA	GD	Pts	Promotion or relegation
1	Vis Pesaro (P)	34	23	4	7	61	29	+32	73	Promoted to 2018–19 Serie C
2	Matelica Calcio (O, Q)	34	22	5	7	66	28	+38	71	Girone F playoffs
3	Avezzano Calcio (Q)	34	16	14	4	51	26	+25	62	Girone F playoffs
4	Pineto Calcio (Q)	34	15	12	7	53	41	+12	57	Girone F playoffs
5	L'Aquila Calcio 1927 (Q)	34	15	10	9	57	40	+17	55	Girone F playoffs
6	Francavilla Calcio 1927	34	14	11	9	47	38	+9	53	
7	San Marino	34	15	6	13	45	35	+10	51	
8	Vastese Calcio 1902	34	15	6	13	55	50	+5	51	
9	Sangiustese 1957	34	13	9	12	39	41	−2	48	
10	Città di Campobasso	34	13	10	11	41	40	+1	45	
11	Castelfidardo	34	12	8	14	43	54	−11	44	
12	Recanatese	34	12	7	15	47	47	0	43	
13	Olympia Agnonese	34	11	8	15	34	35	−1	41	
14	Virtus San Nicolò Teramo (Q, O)	34	11	7	16	42	51	−9	40	Relegation playoffs
15	Jesina Calcio (Q, R)	34	8	10	16	32	46	−14	34	Relegation playoffs, relegated to 2018–19 Eccellenza
16	Monticelli Calcio (R)	34	5	15	14	25	45	−20	30	Relegated to 2018–19 Eccellenza
17	Fabriano Cerreto (R)	34	5	5	24	29	69	−40	20	Relegated to 2018–19 Eccellenza
18	Nerostellati 1910 (R)	34	3	9	22	19	71	−52	18	Relegated to 2018–19 Eccellenza

Rules for classification: 1) points; 2) goal difference; 3) number of goals scored.
(O) Play-off winners; (P) Promoted; (Q) Qualified for the phase indicated; (R) Relegated

== Girone G ==
=== League table ===
Pos	Team	Pld	W	D	L	GF	GA	GD	Pts	Promotion or relegation
1	Rieti (P)	34	22	9	3	76	29	+47	75	Promoted to 2018–19 Serie C
2	Albalonga (O, Q)	34	20	10	4	60	28	+32	70	Girone G playoffs
3	S.F.F. Atletico (Q)	34	19	9	6	73	37	+36	66	Girone G playoffs
4	Trastevere (Q)	34	18	8	8	60	43	+17	62	Girone G playoffs
5	Latina Calcio 1932 (Q)	34	17	10	7	55	42	+13	61	Girone G playoffs
6	Aprilia	34	14	12	8	52	42	+10	54	
7	Cassino	34	15	7	12	50	48	+2	52	
8	Lupa Roma	34	12	10	12	47	49	−2	44	
9	Monterosi	34	12	8	14	47	42	+5	44	
10	Calcio Budoni	34	13	4	17	40	41	−1	43	
11	OstiaMare	34	11	9	14	47	56	−9	42	
12	Calcio Flaminia	34	11	8	15	42	48	−6	41	
13	Sassari Calcio Latte Dolce	34	10	10	14	39	45	−6	40	
14	Lanusei Calcio (Q, O)	34	11	4	19	41	55	−14	37	Relegation playoffs
15	Nuorese Calcio 1930 (Q, R)	34	9	8	17	28	46	−18	35	Relegation playoffs, relegated to 2018–19 Eccellenza
16	Anzio Calcio 1924 (R)	34	7	7	20	28	68	−40	28	Relegated to 2018–19 Eccellenza
17	Tortolì Calcio 1953 (R)	34	7	5	22	36	65	−29	26	Relegated to 2018–19 Eccellenza
18	San Teodoro (R)	34	5	8	21	47	84	−37	23	Relegated to 2018–19 Eccellenza

Rules for classification: 1) points; 2) goal difference; 3) number of goals scored.
(O) Play-off winners; (P) Promoted; (Q) Qualified for the phase indicated; (R) Relegated

== Girone H ==
=== League table ===
Pos	Team	Pld	W	D	L	GF	GA	GD	Pts	Promotion or relegation
1	Potenza (P)	34	25	6	3	81	28	+53	81	Promoted to 2018–19 Serie C
2	Cavese (O, P, Q)	34	24	4	6	68	31	+37	76	Girone H playoffs, promoted to 2018–19 Serie C
3	Team Altamura (Q)	34	22	3	9	56	38	+18	69	Girone H playoffs
4	Taranto (Q)	34	21	5	8	62	38	+24	68	Girone H playoffs
5	Audace Cerignola (Q)	34	17	11	6	60	38	+22	62	Girone H playoffs
6	Picerno	34	14	11	9	49	37	+12	53	
7	Gravina	34	13	13	8	58	42	+16	52	
8	Nardò	34	13	13	8	48	36	+12	52	
9	Città di Gragnano	34	11	9	14	34	40	−6	42	
10	Francavilla	34	11	6	17	59	70	−11	39	
11	Sarnese	34	10	10	14	49	54	−5	38	
12	Pomigliano	34	9	10	15	41	46	−5	37	
13	Turris (Q, O)	34	10	10	14	35	46	−11	36	Relegation playoffs
14	Alto Tavoliere San Severo (Q, R)	34	8	9	17	35	48	−13	33	Relegation playoffs, relegated to 2018–19 Eccellenza
15	Frattese (Q, O)	34	8	9	17	26	50	−24	33	Relegation playoffs
16	Aversa Normanna (Q, R)	34	7	9	18	31	56	−25	30	Relegation playoffs, relegated to 2018–19 Eccellenza
17	Manfredonia (R)	34	3	10	21	41	85	−44	14	Relegated to 2018–19 Eccellenza
18	Sporting Fulgor (R)	34	2	8	24	35	85	−50	14	Relegated to 2018–19 Eccellenza

Rules for classification: 1) points; 2) goal difference; 3) number of goals scored.
(O) Play-off winners; (P) Promoted; (Q) Qualified for the phase indicated; (R) Relegated

== Girone I ==
=== League table ===
Pos	Team	Pld	W	D	L	GF	GA	GD	Pts	Promotion or relegation
1	Vibonese (O, Q, P)	34	22	10	2	67	24	+43	76	Promotion playoff, promoted to 2018–19 Serie C
2	Troina (Q)	34	24	4	6	59	28	+31	76	Promotion playoff, Girone I playoffs
3	Nocerina (Q)	34	20	9	5	50	20	+30	69	Girone I playoffs
4	Ercolanese (Q)	34	19	7	8	58	33	+25	64	Girone I playoffs
5	Igea Virtus Barcellona (O, Q)	34	18	6	10	43	25	+18	60	Girone I playoffs
6	Messina	34	14	11	9	57	39	+18	53	
7	Città di Gela	34	13	13	8	56	46	+10	52	
8	Acireale	34	14	9	11	47	45	+2	51	
9	Gelbison Vallo Della Lucania	34	11	14	9	36	42	−6	47	
10	Portici	34	12	6	16	35	44	−9	42	
11	Cittanovese	34	11	9	14	43	46	−3	42	
12	Sancataldese	34	11	7	16	40	41	−1	40	
13	Roccella	34	10	8	16	41	49	−8	38	
14	Palmese (Q, O)	34	11	10	13	47	54	−7	37	Relegation playoffs
15	Ebolitana (Q, R)	34	6	12	16	32	50	−18	30	Relegation playoffs, relegated to 2018–19 Eccellenza
16	S.C. Palazzolo (R)	34	5	10	19	26	53	−27	25	2018–19 Eccellenza
17	Paceco (R)	34	6	3	25	30	74	−44	20	2018–19 Eccellenza
18	Isola Capo Rizzuto (R)	34	2	6	26	15	69	−54	12	2018–19 Eccellenza

Rules for classification: 1) points; 2) goal difference; 3) number of goals scored.
(O) Play-off winners; (P) Promoted; (Q) Qualified for the phase indicated; (R) Relegated

== Scudetto Serie D ==
The nine group winners enter a tournament which determines the overall Serie D champions and the winner is awarded the Scudetto Serie D.

=== First round ===
- division winners placed into 3 groups of 3
- group winners and best second-placed team qualify for semi-finals
- rank in Discipline Cup and head-to-head will break a tie or ties in points for the top position in a group

Group 1
Team	Pld	W	D	L	GF	GA	GD	Pts
Pro Patria	2	1	1	0	3	1	+2	4
Gozzano	2	1	1	0	2	0	+2	4
Virtus Verona	2	0	0	2	1	5	−4	0

13 May 2018
Pro Patria (B)	3–1	Virtus Verona (C)	Busto Arsizio
20 May 2018
Virtus Verona (C)	0–2	Gozzano (A)	Verona
23 May 2018
Gozzano (A)	0–0	Pro Patria (B)	Gozzano

Group 2
Team	Pld	W	D	L	GF	GA	GD	Pts
Albissola	2	1	1	0	6	4	+2	4
Rimini	2	1	1	0	6	5	+1	4
Vis Pesaro	2	0	0	2	1	4	−3	0

13 May 2018
Rimini (D)	4–4	Albissola (E)	Rimini
20 May 2018
Vis Pesaro (F)	1-2	Rimini (D)	Fossombrone
23 May 2018
Albissola (E)	2–0	Vis Pesaro (F)	Albissola

Group 3
Team	Pld	W	D	L	GF	GA	GD	Pts
Vibonese	2	2	0	0	6	1	+5	6
Rieti	2	0	1	1	1	2	−1	1
Potenza	2	0	1	1	0	4	−4	1

13 May 2018
Potenza (H)	0–0	Rieti (G)	Potenza
20 May 2018
Vibonese (I)	4–0	Potenza (H)	Vibo Valentia
23 May 2018
Rieti (G)	1–2	Vibonese (I)	Rieti

=== Semi-finals ===
- On neutral ground.

31 May 2018
Pro Patria (B)	4–0	Albissola (E)	Rignano sull'Arno
31 May 2018
Gozzano (A)	1–3	Vibonese (I)	San Giovanni Valdarno

=== Final ===
- On neutral ground.

2 June 2018
Vibonese (I)	1–2	Pro Patria (B)	San Giovanni Valdarno

Scudetto winners: Pro Patria

== Promotions ==
The nine group winners are automatically promoted to Serie C. Vibonese was promoted after defeating Troina in a promotion playoff after penalties, as the two teams ended the Girone I on level points. On 3 August 2018, it was officially announced by the Italian Football Federation (FIGC) that Cavese and Imolese were admitted to Serie C to fill the vacancies created by teams that withdrew. Como 1907's request to move up to Serie C was rejected due to its failure to present two required financial guarantees.
