= 2012–13 Coppa Italia Serie D =

Coppa Italia Serie D (Italian for Serie D Italian Cup) is a straight knock-out based competition involving teams from Serie D in Italian football. All games, including the final, are on a home/away basis. The competition has been held since the 1999/00, when Serie D clubs split from Coppa Italia Dilettanti, a tournament that was opened also to teams from Eccellenza and Promozione.

== Short Regulation ==
The preliminary round, the first round, the thirty-second team round, the sixteenth round, the first knockout round and the quarterfinals will be played with one-way races. The semifinals and the final matches only will be played with return race. In the event of a tie at the end of the meetings, no overtime will be played but it will pull directly on penalties. For the semi-final and final games, if it is a tie in aggregate, additional penalties are provided.

== Preliminary round ==
The preliminary round consists of one-leg 47 matches between the following teams:

- 36 companies newly promoted
- 6 companies relegated from Lega Pro Seconda Divisione
- 17 companies winning the play-out in 2011-2012 and these finished with a gap of more than 8 points.
- 3 companies finished (Darfo Boario, Fortis Juventus and Cynthia)
- 3 companies from Lega Pro Prima Divisione (Foggia, Taranto Real and Spal)
- 28 companies which finished at the end of the 2011-2012 season on the twelfth, eleventh and tenth place in groups C, E, F, G, H, I, and on the fourteenth, thirteenth, twelfth and eleventh place in groups A, B, D.
- 1 team that had the most penalties as selected by Coppa Disciplina (Gladiator)

Team 1	Score	Team 2
Tamai	3-1	Sanvitese
Trento	1-1(pen. 6-7)	St. Georgen
Clodiense	3-1	Kras
Real Vicenza	4-1	Fersina Perginese
Giorgione	3-1	Sambonifacese
Union Quinto	0-1	Trissino-Valdagno
Darfo Boario	0-1	Caravaggio
Trezzano	3-0	Sant'Angelo
Verbano	0-2	Pro Sesto
Aurora Seriate	0-0(pen. 4-3)	Atletico Montichiari
Folgore Caratese	0-1	Seregno
Asti	0-4	Bra
Gozzano	2-2(pen. 4-5)	Verbania
Sestri Levante	0-0(pen. 3-4)	Bogliasco
Torres	3-0	Lecco
Progetto Sant'Elia	2-2(pen. 6-7)	Selargius
Castenaso	3-0	Real Spal
Virtus Pavullese	0-1	Formigine
Atletico Pro Piacenza	0-2	Bagnolese
Scandicci	3-0	Fortis Juventus
Forcoli	2-0	FiesoleCaldine
Rosignano	0-1	Massese
Camaiore	0-1	Lucchese
Vis Pesaro	2-1	Riccione
Maceratese	1-2	Recanatese
Bastia	6-0	Todi
Voluntas Spoleto	2-5	Casacastalda
Pontevecchio	0-5	Sansepolcro
R.C. Angolana	1-1(pen. 4-5)	Amiternina
Ostia Mare	0-0(pen. 4-5)	Civitavecchia
San Cesareo	1-1(pen. 5-3)	San Basilio Palestrina
Flaminia Civita Castellana	0-0(pen. 3-2)	Lupa Frascati
Isola Liri	3-3(pen.15-16)	Cynthia
Celano	2-1	Sora
Puteolana Internapoli	0-3	Savoia
Pro Cavese	0-1	Gladiator
Gelbison Cilento	2-1	Agropoli
Torre Neapolis	3-1	Sant'Antonio Abate
Termoli	2-1	Foggia
Bisceglie	1-0	Matera
MonosPolis	3-0	Nardò
Grottaglie	3-1	Taranto
Fortis Trani	1-0	Città di Potenza
Sambiase	1-0	Montalto Uffugo
Città di Messina	2-2(pen. 7-6)	Vibonese
Acireale	1-0	Nissa
Ragusa	3-0	Ribera

== First round ==
The second round consists of 55 one-leg matches between the following teams:

- 47 teams winning the preliminary round
- 63 of the remaining teams, except the 9 companies compete in Coppa Italia (Arezzo, Chieri, Marino, Cosenza, Este, Delta Porto Tolle, Pontisola, Sambenedettese, Sarnese).

Team 1	Score	Team 2
Sacilese	2-0	Tamai
Mezzocorona	0-1	St. Georgen
Pordenone	1-1(pen. 5-6)	Clodiense
Virtus Verona	1-0	Real Vicenza
Legnago Salus	0-1	Cerea
Belluno	1-0	Giorgione
SandonàJesolo	6-0	Montebelluna
San Paolo Padova	1-2	Trissino-Valdagno
Olginatese	1-1(pen. 6-7)	Seregno
Pro Sesto	2-3	Caronnese
Pergolettese	0-0(pen. 7-8)	Aurora Seriate
Voghera	5-0	Trezzano
Castellana	0-2	Caravaggio
MapelloBonate	3-0	AlzanoCene
Novese	3-0	Bra
Borgosesia	3-1	Verbania
Santhià	0-3	Derthona
Tortona Villalvernia	1-1(pen. 5-6)	Imperia
Lavagnese	1-0	Chiavari Caperana
Massese	1-2	Bogliasco
Selargius	2-2(pen. 2-4)	Budoni
Torres	1-3	Porto Torres
Fidenza	2-2(pen. 4-5)	Bagnolese
Virtus Castelfranco	2-1	Formigine
Mezzolara	2-0	Castenaso
Pistoiese	1-1(pen. 5-3)	Lucchese
Scandicci	4-2	Lanciotto
Tuttocuoio	2-1	Forcoli
Vis Pesaro	1-0	Jesina
Ancona	0-0(pen. 3-2)	Recanatese
Deruta	0-0(pen. 4-2)	Bastia
Sporting Terni	1-2	Casacastalda
Sporting Trestina	1-2	Sansepolcro
Castel Rigone	1-0	Pierantonio
Civitanovese	1-2	San Nicolò
Pianese	2-3	Viterbese
Anziolavinio	4-0	Civitavecchia
Astrea	1-2	Arzachena
Fidene	4-1	Celano
San Cesareo	5-2	Flaminia Civita Castellana
Pomigliano	2-3	Savoia
Ischia	2-1	Campania
Casertana	2-1	Cynthia
Gelbison Cilento	1-3	Gladiator
Battipagliese	0-1	Torre Neapolis
Isernia	1-1(pen. 3-2)	Real Hyria Nola
Olympia Agnonese	3-1	Amiternina
Bisceglie	1-1(pen. 4-3)	Termoli
Brindisi	1-2	MonosPolis
Francavilla	1-0	Fortis Trani
Grottaglie	2-2(pen. 4-2)	Sambiase
Città di Messina	3-1	Acireale
Messina	2-0	Comprensorio Normanno
Licata	1-1(pen. 4-5)	Ragusa
Noto	1-0	Palazzolo

== Second round ==
The second round consists of 32 one-leg matches between the following teams:

- 55 teams winning the first round
- 9 companies which competed in Coppa Italia (Arezzo, Chieri, Marino, Cosenza, Este, Delta Porto Tolle, Pontisola, Sambenedettese, Sarnese).

Team 1	Score	Team 2
Clodiense	1-1 (pen. 1-3)	Sacilese
Cerea	0-1	Trissino-Valdagno
Belluno	2-2 (pen. 3-2)	SandonàJesolo
Este	1-1 (pen. 3-5)	Delta Porto Tolle
St. Georgen	2-3	Virtus Verona
Pontisola	1-1 (pen. 3-0)	Aurora Seriate
Caronnese	1-0	Seregno
Voghera	2-2 (pen. 4-5)	Caravaggio
Arzachena	2-1	MapelloBonate
Budoni	0-0 (pen. 4-5)	Porto Torres
Chieri	0-2	Borgosesia
Derthona	2-0	Novese
Bogliasco	4-1	Imperia
Pistoiese	1-2	Lavagnese
Virtus Castelfranco	2-0	Bagnolese
Mezzolara	0-1	Scandicci
Arezzo	2-1	Tuttocuoio
Sansepolcro	2-1	Deruta
Casacastalda	2-2 (pen. 5-4)	Castel Rigone
Viterbese	2-1	Marino
Ancona	3-1	Vis Pesaro
Sambenedettese	0-0 (pen. 5-3)	San Nicolò
Isernia	2-0	Olympia Agnonese
Anziolavinio	1-2	Fidene
Gladiator	1-1 (pen. 2-3)	San Cesareo
Casertana	2-2 (pen. 2-0)	Ischia
MonosPolis	3-2	Bisceglie
Sarnese	1-1 (pen. 5-4)	Savoia
Francavilla	1-1 (pen. 4-3)	Grottaglie
Torre Neapolis	2-1	Cosenza
Messina	0-1	Città di Messina
Ragusa	1-0	Noto

== Third round ==
The third round consists of 16 one-leg matches between the following teams:

- 32 teams winning the second round

Team 1	Score	Team 2
Trissino-Valdagno	0-5	Sacilese
Delta Porto Tolle	6-1	SandonàJesolo
Virtus Verona	1-1 (pen. 3-4)	Pontisola
Caravaggio	1-2	Caronnese
Porto Torres	3-1	Arzachena
Borgosesia	1-2	Derthona
Lavagnese	0-0 (pen. 5-3)	Bogliasco
Scandicci	0-0 (pen. 4-5)	Virtus Castelfranco
Arezzo	1-0	Sansepolcro
Viterbese	1-1 (pen. 5-6)	Casacastalda
Sambenedettese	3-3 (pen. 4-3)	Ancona
Fidene	2-3	Isernia
San Cesareo	3-0	Casertana
Sarnese	1-2	MonosPolis
Francavilla	0-0 (pen. 3-4)	Torre Neapolis
Città di Messina	1-1 (pen. 4-3)	Ragusa

== Fourth round ==
The fourth round consists of 8 one-leg matches between the following teams:

- 16 teams winning the second round

Team 1	Score	Team 2
Sacilese	0-2	Delta Porto Tolle
Pontisola	1-1 (pen. 4-5)	Caronnese
Derthona	0-0 (pen. 4-5)	Porto Torres
Bogliasco	0-1	Virtus Castelfranco
Casacastalda	0-0 (pen. 3-4)	Arezzo
Isernia	1-0	Sambenedettese
MonosPolis	3-1	San Cesareo
Torre Neapolis	1-1 (pen. 5-3)	Città di Messina

== Quarterfinals ==
Quarterfinals consist of 4 one-leg matches between the following teams:

- 8 teams winning the second round

Team 1	Score	Team 2
Caronnese	1-3	Delta Porto Tolle
Virtus Castelfranco	2-0	Porto Torres
Arezzo	2-2 (pen. 5-4)	Isernia
Torre Neapolis	2-0	MonosPolis

== Semifinals ==
Semifinals consist of 2 two-leg matches between the following teams:

- 4 teams winning quarterfinals

Team 1	Agg.	Team 2	1st leg	2nd leg
Virtus Castelfranco	2-6	Delta Porto Tolle	1-3	1-3
Torre Neapolis	5-3	Arezzo	4-2	1-1

== Final ==
Final consists of one-leg match between the following teams:

- 2 teams winning semifinals

Team 1	Score	Team 2
Delta Porto Tolle	1-3	Torre Neapolis
