= 2012–13 Serie D =

Serie D
- Season: 2012–13

The 2012–13 Serie D was the sixty-fifth edition of the top level Italian non-professional football championship. It represented the fifth tier in the Italian football league system.

It consisted of 162 teams divided into nine 18-team divisions.

== Promotions ==
The nine division winners are automatically promoted to Lega Pro Seconda Divisione 2013–14.

== Playoffs ==
Teams placed second through fifth in each division enter a playoff tournament, after the regular season, where the nine winners will compete among themselves with the best semifinalist and the finalist of Coppa Italia Serie D to determine three of the four semi-finalists. The fourth is the winner of Coppa Italia Serie D.

== Relegations Playout ==
- In the groups A-D-E-F-G-H-I of 18 teams the two last-placed teams (17th and 18th) with the 16th, if the 13th place is more of 8 points ahead of it and the 15th, if the 14th place is more of 8 points ahead of this, are relegated directly. Otherwise the teams ranked 13th to 16th play a two-legged playout (13th vs 16th, and 14th vs 15th).
- In the groups B-C of 20 teams the two last-placed teams (19th and 20th) with the 18th, if the 15th place is more of 8 points ahead of it and the 17th, if the 16th place is more of 8 points ahead of this, are relegated directly. Otherwise the teams ranked 15th to 18th play a two-legged playout (15th vs 18th, and 16th vs 17th).

== Tie-Breakers ==
If the two teams finish in an aggregate tie for to decide who is promoted and relegated, in neutral ground will be played one tie breaker, with possible extra time and penalties.

== Scudetto Dilettanti ==
The nine division winners enter a tournament to determine the over-all Serie D champion and is awarded the Scudetto Dilettanti.

== Events ==
=== Start of season ===
Given a normal season where there are no team failures and special promotions, Serie D would feature 9 teams that had been relegated from Lega Pro Seconda Divisione, 36 teams that had been promoted from Eccellenza, and 123 teams that had played in Serie D the year before.

Due to eight bankruptcies and exclusions, the 2012–13 season is to feature 6 teams that played in the 2011-12 Lega Pro Seconda Divisione season, 37 teams that played in the 2011-12 Eccellenza season and 119 teams that played in 2011–12 Serie D.

The league also admitted three of the teams that were excluded from the professional leagues. Real Spal (Girone D), formerly SPAL, Foggia (Girone H) and Taranto (Girone H) which all played in the 2011-12 Lega Pro Prima Divisione season. The league further admitted three teams from Eccellenza to fill the vacancies created. These teams are:

- Darfo Boario which finished 15th in Serie D 2011–12 Girone B
- Cynthia which finished 16th in Serie D 2011–12 Girone G
- Fortis Juventus which finished 2nd in Eccellenza Tuscany Girone B and was eliminated in the national play-off

== Standings ==
=== Girone A ===
==== Teams ====
Teams from Aosta Valley, Piedmont, Liguria & Lombardy

Club	City	Stadium	Capacity	2011–12 season
Asti	Asti	Censin Bosia	6,000	16th in Serie D Girone A
Bogliasco	Bogliasco (playing in Santa Margherita Ligure)	Eugenio Broccardi	2,000	12th in Serie D Girone A
Borgosesia	Borgosesia	Comunale	2,500	6th in Serie D Girone A
Bra	Bra	Comunale "Madonna dei fiori"	700	1st in Piedmont and Aosta Valley Girone B
Chiavari Caperana	Chiavari	Angelo Daneri	2,300	9th in Serie D Girone A
Chieri	Chieri	Piero De Paoli	4,000	2nd in Serie D Girone A
Derthona	Tortona	Fausto Coppi	2,700	8th in Serie D Girone A
Folgore Caratese	Carate Brianza	XXV Aprile	3,000	11th in Serie D Girone A
Gozzano	Gozzano	Comunale	4,000	14th in Serie D Girone B
Imperia	Imperia	Nino Ciccione	1,500	10th in Serie D Girone A(as Pro Imperia)
Lavagnese	Lavagna	Edoardo Riboli	800	5th in Serie D Girone A
Novese	Novi Ligure	Costante Girardengo	3,500	4th in Serie D Girone A
Santhià	Santhià	Fabio Pairotto	500	3rd in Serie D Girone A
Sestri Levante	Sestri Levante	Giuseppe Sivori	1,500	1st in Eccellenza Liguria
Tortona Villalvernia	Tortona and Villalvernia (playing in Tortona)	Fausto Coppi	2,700	7th in Serie D Girone A(as Villalvernia V.B.)
Trezzano	Trezzano sul Naviglio	Comunale	2,000	13th in Serie D Girone A(as Naviglio Trezzano)
Verbania	Verbania	Carlo Pedroli	3,000	1st in Piedmont and Aosta Valley Girone A
Verbano	Besozzo	Comunale	2,000	14th in Serie D Girone A

==== League table ====
Pos	Team	Pld	W	D	L	GF	GA	GD	Pts	Promotion or relegation
1	Bra (C, P)	34	21	9	4	64	35	+29	72	Promotion to Lega Pro Seconda Divisione
2	Santhià	34	20	9	5	69	42	+27	69	Qualification for Promotion play-off
3	Chieri	34	19	7	8	48	33	+15	64	Qualification for Promotion play-off
4	Lavagnese	34	18	8	8	53	37	+16	62 (Note: The score of Lavagnese-Tortona Villalvernia was transformed by sports judgment from 3-2 to 0-3 because Lavagnese has deployed the player Calos Clay Franca who was disqualified.)	Qualification for Promotion play-off
5	Borgosesia	34	15	11	8	65	32	+33	56	Qualification for Promotion play-off
6	Folgore Caratese	34	14	10	10	36	32	+4	52	
7	Chiavari Caperana	34	15	5	14	53	44	+9	50	
8	Sestri Levante	34	13	8	13	50	43	+7	47	
9	Verbania	34	10	14	10	44	38	+6	44	
10	Bogliasco (Note: Bogliasco merged with A.S.D. Calcio Giovanile Rapallo and will play in the next championship as G.S.D. RapalloBogliasco.)	34	11	10	13	47	46	+1	43	
11	Gozzano	34	10	13	11	40	40	0	43	
12	Derthona	34	11	12	11	29	33	−4	43 (Note: Derthona was docked 2 points.)	
13	Verbano (R)	34	11	7	16	37	44	−7	40	Qualification for Relegation play-off
14	Asti	34	11	6	17	31	49	−18	39	Qualification for Relegation play-off
15	Tortona Villalvernia (R)	34	8	11	15	32	50	−18	35	Qualification for Relegation play-off
16	Novese	34	8	9	17	33	55	−22	33	Qualification for Relegation play-off
17	Trezzano (R)	34	6	7	21	27	50	−23	25	Relegation to Eccellenza
18	Imperia (R)	34	6	2	26	33	89	−56	20	Relegation to Eccellenza

Updated to match(es) played on 5 May 2013. Source:
Rules for classification: 1) points; 2) goal difference; 3) number of goals scored.
(C) Champions; (P) Promoted; (R) Relegated

=== Girone B ===
==== Teams ====
Teams from Lombardy & Trentino-Alto Adige/Südtirol

Club	City	Stadium	Capacity	2011–12 season
AlzanoCene	Alzano Lombardo and Cene (playing in Alzano Lombardo)	Carillo Pesenti Pigna	1,900	7th in Serie D Girone B
Atletico Montichiari	Montichiari	Romeo Menti	2,500	18th in Serie D Girone B(as Carpenedolo)
Aurora Seriate	Seriate	Comunale	1,000	13th in Serie D Girone B
Caravaggio	Caravaggio	Comunale	3,000	1st in Eccellenza Lombardy Girone B
Caronnese	Caronno Pertusella	Comunale	1,000	6th in Serie D Girone B
Castellana	Castel Goffredo	Comunale	1,500	8th in Serie D Girone B
Darfo Boario	Darfo Boario Terme	Comunale	1,200	15th in Serie D Girone B
Fersina Perginese	Pergine Valsugana	Comunale	2,500	1st in Eccellenza Trentino-Alto Adige/Südtirol
Lecco	Lecco	Rigamonti-Ceppi	4,977	17th in Lega Pro Seconda Divisione A
MapelloBonate	Mapello and Bonate Sopra (playing in Mapello)	Comunale	1,000	5th in Serie D Girone B
Mezzocorona	Mezzocorona	Comunale	1,500	7th in Serie D Girone C
Olginatese	Olginate	Comunale	1,000	3rd in Serie D Girone B
Pergolettese	Crema	Voltini	4,100	4th in Serie D Girone B(as Pizzighettone)
Pontisola	Ponte San Pietro, Terno d'Isola and Chignolo d'Isola (playing in Ponte San Pietro)	Matteo Legler	2,000	2nd in Serie D Girone B
Pro Sesto	Sesto San Giovanni	Breda	4,500	1st in Eccellenza Lombardy Girone A
Sant'Angelo	Sant'Angelo Lodigiano	Carlo Chiesa	4,100	1st in Eccellenza Lombardy Girone C
Seregno	Seregno	Ferruccio	3,700	16th in Serie D Girone B
St. Georgen	Bruneck	Comunale	3,200	13th in Serie D Girone C
Trento	Trento	Briamasco	4,227	2nd in Eccellenza Trentino-Alto Adige/Südtirol
Voghera	Voghera	Giovanni Parisi	4,000	12th in Serie D Girone B

==== League table ====
Pos	Team	Pld	W	D	L	GF	GA	GD	Pts	Promotion or relegation
1	Pergolettese (C, P)	38	25	9	4	64	27	+37	84	Promotion to Lega Pro Seconda Divisione
2	Pontisola	38	24	11	3	87	45	+42	83 (Note: The score of Pontisola-Trento was transformed by sports judgment from 2-3 to 3-0 because Trento deployed an ineligible player.)	Qualification for Promotion play-off
3	Olginatese	38	19	13	6	59	32	+27	70	Qualification for Promotion play-off
4	Voghera	38	21	5	12	60	43	+17	68	Didn't enroll in the next championship (Note: Voghera didn't enroll in the next championship and disappeared from the Italian football.)
5	Lecco	38	17	14	7	66	42	+24	62 (Note: Darfo Boario and Lecco were docked 3 points due to financial irregularities.)	Qualification for Promotion play-off
6	Caronnese	38	17	9	12	51	45	+6	60	
7	Castellana	38	15	13	10	50	44	+6	58	
8	Caravaggio	38	14	13	11	41	37	+4	55	
9	Atletico Montichiari	38	15	9	14	58	53	+5	54	
10	Aurora Seriate	38	12	17	9	55	52	+3	53	
11	MapelloBonate	38	11	15	12	60	56	+4	48	
12	Darfo Boario	38	12	13	13	57	55	+2	46	
13	AlzanoCene	38	11	14	13	62	63	−1	46 (Note: AlzanoCene was docked 1 point due to financial irregularities.)	
14	Seregno	38	11	13	14	50	53	−3	46	
15	Fersina Perginese	38	12	10	16	52	56	−4	46	
16	Pro Sesto	38	11	11	16	44	50	−6	44	
17	Mezzocorona	38	9	5	24	49	76	−27	32	Qualification for Relegation play-off (Note: Mezzocorona remained in the league to fill the vacancies created.)
18	Trento (R)	38	7	8	23	45	82	−37	28 (Note: Trento was docked 1 point for failing to pay the reimbursement of expenses of the former players Marco Dell'Anna and Andrea Tummiolo.)	Relegation to Eccellenza
19	St. Georgen (R)	38	6	9	23	47	85	−38	27	Relegation to Eccellenza
20	Sant'Angelo (R)	38	2	7	29	31	92	−61	13	Relegation to Eccellenza

Updated to match(es) played on 5 May 2013. Source:
Rules for classification: 1) points; 2) goal difference; 3) number of goals scored.
(C) Champions; (P) Promoted; (R) Relegated

=== Girone C ===
==== Teams ====
Teams from Friuli-Venezia Giulia & Veneto

Club	City	Stadium	Capacity	2011–12 season
Belluno	Belluno	Polisportivo	2,585	9th in Serie D Girone C
Cerea	Cerea	Pelaloca	2,000	9th in Serie D Girone D
Clodiense	Chioggia	Aldo e Dino Ballarin	3,622	1st in Eccellenza Veneto Girone B
Delta Porto Tolle	Porto Tolle	Comunale	3,000	2nd in Serie D Girone C
Este	Este	Nuovo Comunale	1,200	3rd in Serie D Girone D
Giorgione	Castelfranco Veneto	Comunale	2,100	10th in Serie D Girone C
Kras	Monrupino	Repen	250	1st in Eccellenza Friuli-Venezia Giulia
Legnago Salus	Legnago	Mario Sandrini	2,152	3rd in Serie D Girone C
Montebelluna	Montebelluna	San Vigilio	2,000	4th in Serie D Girone C
Pordenone	Pordenone	Ottavio Bottecchia	3,000	8th in Serie D Girone C
Real Vicenza	Vicenza	Romeo Menti	12,200	2nd in Eccellenza Veneto Girone A
Sacilese	Sacile	XXV Aprile – Aldo Castenetto	2,600	5th in Serie D Girone C
SandonàJesolo	San Donà di Piave	Verino Zanutto	4,000	6th in Serie D Girone C
San Paolo Padova	Padua	Plebiscito	9,600	5th in Serie D Girone D
Sanvitese	San Vito al Tagliamento	Comunale	2,500	14th in Serie D Girone C
Sambonifacese	San Bonifacio	Renzo Tizian	1,450	19th in Lega Pro Seconda Divisione A
Tamai	Brugnera	Comunale	1,000	12th in Serie D Girone C
Trissino-Valdagno	Valdagno	Stadio dei Fiori	6,000	1st in Eccellenza Veneto Girone A(as Trissino)
Union Quinto	Quinto di Treviso	Omobono Tenni	1,000	11th in Serie D Girone C
Virtus Verona	Verona	Gavagnin	1,000	6th in Serie D Girone D

==== League table ====
Pos	Team	Pld	W	D	L	GF	GA	GD	Pts	Promotion or relegation
1	Delta Porto Tolle (C, P)	38	21	12	5	64	29	+35	75	Promotion to Lega Pro Seconda Divisione
2	Pordenone	38	20	11	7	55	38	+17	71	Qualification for Promotion play-off
3	Sambonifacese	38	22	5	11	53	36	+17	71	Qualification for Promotion play-off
4	Virtus Verona (O, P)	38	19	12	7	60	37	+23	69	Promotion to Lega Pro Seconda Divisione (Note: Virtus Verona and Real Vicenza were promoted to Lega Pro Seconda Divisione to fill the vacancies created.)
5	Real Vicenza (P)	38	18	13	7	70	49	+21	67	Promotion to Lega Pro Seconda Divisione
6	Clodiense	38	20	5	13	48	43	+5	65	
7	SandonàJesolo	38	15	13	10	59	48	+11	58	Didn't enroll in the next championship (Note: SandonàJesolo didn't enroll in the next championship and disappeared from the Italian football.)
8	Sacilese	38	16	8	14	48	41	+7	56	
9	Trissino-Valdagno	38	14	12	12	58	49	+9	54	
10	Belluno	38	14	10	14	53	56	−3	52	
11	Legnago Salus	38	14	9	15	54	47	+7	51	
12	Tamai	38	10	16	12	54	52	+2	46	
13	Este	38	12	10	16	45	50	−5	46	
14	San Paolo Padova	38	12	10	16	43	48	−5	46	
15	Cerea (R)	38	10	14	14	42	56	−14	44	Qualification for Relegation play-off
16	Montebelluna	38	11	8	19	40	62	−22	41	Qualification for Relegation play-off
17	Giorgione	38	10	9	19	40	52	−12	39	Qualification for Relegation play-off (Note: Giorgione remained in the league to fill the vacancies created.)
18	Sanvitese	38	8	12	18	33	52	−19	36	Qualification for Relegation play-off
19	Kras (R)	38	8	5	25	34	73	−39	29	Relegation to Eccellenza
20	Union Quinto (R)	38	4	9	25	32	66	−34	21	Relegation to Eccellenza

Updated to match(es) played on 5 May 2013. Source:
Rules for classification: 1) points; 2) goal difference; 3) number of goals scored.
(C) Champions; (O) Play-off winners; (P) Promoted; (R) Relegated

=== Girone D ===
==== Teams ====
Teams from Emilia-Romagna & Tuscany

Club	City	Stadium	Capacity	2011–12 season
Atletico BP Pro Piacenza	Piacenza	G. Siboni	800	11th in Serie D Girone B
Bagnolese	Bagnolo in Piano	Fratelli Campari	1,000	11th in Serie D Girone D
Camaiore	Camaiore	Comunale	3,000	14th in Serie D Girone D
Castenaso Van Goof	Castenaso	G. Negrini	1,200	1st in Eccellenza Emilia-Romagna Girone B(as Castenaso Villanova)
Fidenza	Fidenza	Dario Ballotta	1,400	9th in Serie D Girone B
Forcoli	Palaia	Guido Brunner	3,000	13th in Serie D Girone D
Formigine	Formigine	Pincelli	1,500	1st in Eccellenza Emilia-Romagna Girone A
Fortis Juventus	Borgo San Lorenzo	Stadio Giacomo Romanelli	2,500	2nd in Eccellenza Tuscany Girone B
Lucchese	Lucca	Porta Elisa	7,386	1st in Eccellenza Tuscany Girone A
Massese	Massa	degli Oliveti	4,500	3rd in Eccellenza Tuscany Girone A
Mezzolara	Budrio	Pietro Zucchini	1,300	2nd in Serie D Girone D
Pistoiese	Pistoia	Marcello Melani	13,195	7th in Serie D Girone D
Real Spal	Ferrara	Paolo Mazza	19,000	15th in Lega Pro Prima Divisione A(as SPAL)
Riccione	Riccione	Italo Niccoletti	7,000	13th in Serie D Girone F
Rosignano	Rosignano Marittimo	Ernesto Solvay	1,400	12th in Serie D Girone D
Tuttocuoio	San Miniato	Leporaia	600	10th in Serie D Girone D
Virtus Castelfranco	Castelfranco Emilia	Fausto Ferrarini	1,280	4th in Serie D Girone D
Virtus Pavullese	Pavullo nel Frignano	Giuseppe Minelli	2,500	17th in Serie D Girone D

==== League table ====
Pos	Team	Pld	W	D	L	GF	GA	GD	Pts	Promotion or relegation
1	Tuttocuoio (C, P)	34	21	7	6	59	34	+25	70 (Note: The score of Tuttocuoio-Riccione not played, has become 3-0 by sports judgment because the guests are presented with two teams, each claiming the legitimate representation of Riccione.)	Promotion to Lega Pro Seconda Divisione
2	Massese	34	20	7	7	62	26	+36	67	Qualification for Promotion play-off
3	Lucchese	34	18	11	5	49	24	+25	65	Qualification for Promotion play-off
4	Atletico Pro Piacenza	34	19	8	7	63	33	+30	65 (Note: The score of Atl. Piacenza-Castenaso Van Goof was transformed by sports judgment from 3-3 to 3-0 for infringement of the rule of under.)	Qualification for Promotion play-off
5	Pistoiese	34	18	9	7	65	34	+31	63	Qualification for Promotion play-off
6	Virtus Castelfranco	34	17	8	9	75	51	+24	59	Qualification for Promotion play-off (Note: Virtus Castelfranco qualified for the third round of the Promotion play-off as a semifinalist of Coppa Italia Serie D 2012-13.)
7	Real Spal (P)	34	15	11	8	57	40	+17	56	Promotion to Lega Pro Seconda Divisione (Note: Real Spal will play in 2013-14 Lega Pro Seconda divisione as SPAL, after merged with Giacomense that moved to the city of Ferrara.)
8	Mezzolara	34	13	12	9	61	43	+18	51	
9	Fidenza	34	13	5	16	37	45	−8	44	
10	Formigine	34	10	11	13	37	43	−6	41	
11	Fortis Juventus	34	10	11	13	42	52	−10	41	
12	Camaiore	34	11	6	17	48	58	−10	39	
13	Riccione	34	9	10	15	36	67	−31	36 (Note: Riccione was docked 1 point because it is presented with two teams in the match with Tuttocuoio, not played.)	Qualification for Relegation play-off
14	Forcoli	34	9	7	18	24	42	−18	34	Qualification for Relegation play-off
15	Castenaso (R)	34	8	9	17	35	62	−27	33	Qualification for Relegation play-off
16	Virtus Pavullese (R)	34	8	4	22	37	67	−30	28	Qualification for Relegation play-off
17	Bagnolese (R)	34	5	10	19	32	58	−26	25	Relegation to Eccellenza
18	Rosignano (R)	34	7	4	23	30	70	−40	25	Relegation to Eccellenza

Updated to match(es) played on 5 May 2013. Source:
Rules for classification: 1) points; 2) goal difference; 3) number of goals scored.
(C) Champions; (P) Promoted; (R) Relegated

=== Girone E ===
==== Teams ====
Teams from Tuscany, Umbria & Lazio

Club	City	Stadium	Capacity	2011–12 season
Arezzo	Arezzo	Città di Arezzo	15,128	2nd in Serie D Girone E
Bastia	Bastia Umbra	Comunale	1,500	1st in Eccellenza Umbria
Casacastalda	Valfabbrica	Comunale	1,000	2nd in Eccellenza Umbria
Castel Rigone	Passignano sul Trasimeno	San Bartolomeo	1,200	4th in Serie D Girone E
Deruta	Deruta	Comunale	600	8th in Serie D Girone E
FiesoleCaldine	Fiesole	Comunale "Poggioloni"	700	1st in Eccellenza Tuscany Girone B
Flaminia Civita Castellana	Civita Castellana	Turrido Madani	1,300	13th in Serie D Girone E
Lanciotto	Campi Bisenzio	Emil Zatopek	2,000	8th in Serie D Girone D
Pianese	Piancastagnaio	Comunale	1,000	3rd in Serie D Girone E
Pierantonio	Umbertide	Comunale "Morandi"	2,200	7th in Serie D Girone E
Pontevecchio	Ponte San Giovanni	degli Ornari	1,000	15th in Serie D Girone E
Sansepolcro	Sansepolcro	Giovanni Buitoni	2,000	12th in Serie D Girone E
Scandicci	Scandicci	Turri	1,800	15th in Serie D Girone D
Sporting Terni	Terni	Mirko Fabrizi	1,070	5th in Serie D Girone E
Todi	Todi	Franco Martelli	1,200	11th in Serie D Girone E
Trestina	Trestina	Lorenzo Casini	500	6th in Serie D Girone E
Viterbese	Viterbo	Enrico Rocchi	6,000	9th in Serie D Girone E
Voluntas Spoleto	Spoleto	Comunale	1,800	10th in Serie D Girone E

==== League table ====
Pos	Team	Pld	W	D	L	GF	GA	GD	Pts	Promotion or relegation
1	Castel Rigone (C, P)	34	20	8	6	58	25	+33	68	Promotion to Lega Pro Seconda Divisione
2	Casacastalda (Note: Casacastalda merged with A.S. Gualdo Calcio and will play in the next championship as A.S. GualdoCasacastalda.)	34	19	10	5	69	35	+34	67	
3	Viterbese (R)	34	17	12	5	58	38	+20	63	Didn't enroll in the next championship (Note: Viterbese didn't enroll in the next championship and disappeared from the Italian football.)
4	Sansepolcro	34	16	10	8	41	28	+13	58	Qualification for Promotion play-off
5	Voluntas Spoleto	34	14	10	10	41	41	0	52	Qualification for Promotion play-off
6	Deruta	34	12	13	9	50	49	+1	49	
7	Pianese	34	13	8	13	39	39	0	47	
8	FiesoleCaldine	34	12	11	11	40	42	−2	47	
9	Arezzo	34	13	7	14	49	34	+15	46	Qualification for Promotion play-off (Note: Arezzo qualified for the fourth round of the Promotion play-off as the best semifinalist of Coppa Italia Serie D 2012-13.)
10	Sporting Terni (R)	34	11	13	10	37	33	+4	46	Excluded from Italian football (Note: Sporting Terni didn't enroll in the next championship and disappeared from the Italian football.)
11	Bastia	34	12	9	13	38	39	−1	45	
12	Trestina	34	12	9	13	45	50	−5	45	
13	Scandicci	34	12	8	14	40	48	−8	44	
14	Pontevecchio	34	13	5	16	38	51	−13	44	Qualification for Relegation play-off (Note: Pontevecchio remained in the league to fill the vacancies created.)
15	Flaminia Civita Castellana	34	10	7	17	38	49	−11	37	Qualification for Relegation play-off
16	Lanciotto (R)	34	9	8	17	32	44	−12	35	Relegation to Eccellenza
17	Pierantonio (R)	34	6	9	19	30	60	−30	27	Relegation to Eccellenza
18	Todi (R)	34	4	8	22	30	69	−39	20	Relegation to Eccellenza

Updated to match(es) played on 5 May 2013. Source:
Rules for classification: 1) points; 2) goal difference; 3) number of goals scored.
(C) Champions; (P) Promoted; (R) Relegated

=== Girone F ===
==== Teams ====
Teams from Abruzzo, Lazio, Marche & Molise

Club	City	Stadium	Capacity	2011–12 season
Amiternina	Scoppito	Comunale	500	1st in Eccellenza Abruzzo
Ancona 1905	Ancona	Conero	26,000	3rd in Serie D Girone F
Astrea	Rome	Casal del Marmo	2,500	7th in Serie D Girone G
Celano	Celano	Fabio Piccone	3,200	21st in Lega Pro Seconda Divisione B
Civitanovese	Civitanova Marche	Comunale	4,000	4th in Serie D Girone F
Fidene	Rome	Walter Cervini	2,000	4th in Serie D Girone G
Isernia	Isernia	Mario Lancellotta	5,000	5th in Serie D Girone F
Jesina	Jesi	Pacifico Carotti	5,000	8th in Serie D Girone F
Maceratese	Macerata	Helvia Recina	5,846	1st in Eccellenza Marche
Marino	Marino	Comunale Domenico Fiore	3,000	2nd in Serie D Girone G
Olympia Agnonese	Agnone	Civitelle	4,000	9th in Serie D Girone F
Recanatese	Recanati	Nicola Tubaldi	2,000	10th in Serie D Girone F
R.C. Angolana	Città Sant'Angelo	Comunale	4,120	14th in Serie D Girone F
Sambenedettese	San Benedetto del Tronto	Riviera delle Palme	7,494	2nd in Serie D Girone F
San Cesareo	San Cesareo	Comunale	2,000	1st in Eccellenza Lazio Girone B
San Nicolò	San Nicolò a Tordino (playing in Teramo)	Comunale	7,498	7th in Serie D Girone F
Termoli	Termoli	Gino Cannarsa	3,300	1st in Eccellenza Molise
Vis Pesaro	Pesaro	Tonino Benelli	4,050	11th in Serie D Girone F

==== League table ====
Pos	Team	Pld	W	D	L	GF	GA	GD	Pts	Qualification or relegation
1	Sambenedettese (R, C)	34	21	8	5	75	35	+40	71	Relegation to Eccellenza (Note: Sambenedettese was not promoted to Lega Pro Seconda Divisione as it was excluded by Federal Council's decision for incomplete documentation of submission to the league. It is relegated to Eccellenza after the refoundation.)
2	Termoli	34	20	8	6	74	39	+35	68	Qualification for Promotion play-off
3	San Cesareo	34	20	8	6	69	44	+25	68	Qualification for Promotion play-off
4	Maceratese	34	18	10	6	58	38	+20	64	Qualification for Promotion play-off
5	Vis Pesaro	34	16	9	9	47	24	+23	57	Qualification for Promotion play-off
6	Olympia Agnonese	34	14	11	9	68	56	+12	53	
7	Ancona 1905	34	14	11	9	54	43	+11	53	
8	Astrea	34	14	8	12	53	47	+6	50	
9	Jesina	34	11	13	10	50	48	+2	46	
10	Civitanovese	34	11	9	14	35	45	−10	42 (Note: The score of C. Marino-Civitanovese of 4 November finished 2-2, was cancelled by sports judgment for technical error of the referee Iorio of Taranto (expulsion not imposed for two yellow cards to the player Jurgi Filopati of Civitanovese). The match was repeated on 21 November with the final score of 1-2.)	
11	Amiternina	34	10	10	14	39	49	−10	40	
12	Fidene (R)	34	9	10	15	40	52	−12	37	Didn't enroll in the next championship (Note: Fidene didn't enroll in the next championship and disappeared from the Italian football.)
13	Isernia	34	9	11	14	46	64	−18	38	
14	R.C. Angolana	34	10	7	17	35	53	−18	37	Qualification for Relegation play-off (Note: R.C. Angolana remained in the league to fill the vacancies created.)
15	Celano	34	6	15	13	31	41	−10	33	Qualification for Relegation play-off
16	Recanatese	34	6	11	17	28	50	−22	29	Qualification for Relegation play-off (Note: Recanatese remained in the league to fill the vacancies created.)
17	San Nicolò (R)	34	5	7	22	35	61	−26	22	Relegation to Eccellenza
18	Marino (R)	34	5	5	24	32	79	−47	20	Excluded from italian football after transfer sports title (Note: Marino gave its sports title to A.S.D. Monterotondo Calcio and was excluded from Italian football.)

Updated to match(es) played on 5 May 2013. Source:
Rules for classification: 1) points; 2) goal difference; 3) number of goals scored.
(C) Champions; (R) Relegated

=== Girone G ===
==== Teams ====
Teams from Campania, Lazio & Sardinia

Club	City	Stadium	Capacity	2011–12 season
Anziolavinio	Anzio	Massimo Bruschini	3,000	9th in Serie D Girone G
Arzachena	Arzachena	Biagio Pirina	3,100	8th in Serie D Girone G
Budoni	Budoni	Comunale	1,500	5th in Serie D Girone G
Casertana	Caserta	Alberto Pinto	12,000	4th in Serie D Girone H
Civitavecchia	Civitavecchia	Giovanni Maria Fattori	2,500	10th in Serie D Girone G
Cynthia	Genzano di Roma	Stadio Comunale (Genzano di Roma)	4,550	16th in Serie D Girone G
Isola Liri	Isola del Liri	Stadio Conte Arduino Mangoni	3,008	19th in Lega Pro Seconda Divisione B
Lupa Frascati	Frascati	VIII settembre	5,000	2nd in Eccellenza Lazio Girone B
Ostia Mare	Ostia	Anco Marzio	1,000	1st in Eccellenza Lazio Girone A
Porto Torres	Porto Torres	Comunale	2,500	6th in Serie D Girone G
Progetto Sant'Elia	Cagliari	Campo Comunale Sant'Elia	300	15th in Serie D Girone G
Real Hyria Nola	Nola	Sporting Club	1,500	6th in Serie D Girone H(as Turris)
San Basilio Palestrina	Rome	Francesca Gianni	4,000	13th in Serie D Girone G(as Palestrina)
Sarnese	Sarno	Felice Squitieri	4,000	2nd in Serie D Girone H
Selargius	Selargius	Generale Virgilio Porcu	1,200	11th in Serie D Girone G
Sora	Sora	Claudio Tomei	6,500	12th in Serie D Girone G
Torre Neapolis	Torre del Greco	Amerigo Liguori	5,300	18th in Lega Pro Seconda Divisione B(as Neapolis Mugnano)
Torres	Sassari	Vanni Sanna	7,480	1st in Eccellenza Sardinia

==== League table ====
Pos	Team	Pld	W	D	L	GF	GA	GD	Pts	Promotion or relegation
1	Torres (C, P)	34	18	14	2	62	30	+32	68	Promotion to Lega Pro Seconda Divisione
2	Torre Neapolis	34	16	12	6	47	37	+10	60	Qualification for Promotion play-off (Note: Torre Neapolis qualified for the Semifinals of the Promotion play-off as the winner of Coppa Italia Serie D 2012-13.)
3	Sarnese (R)	34	17	9	8	47	30	+17	60	Relegation to Eccellenza (Note: Sarnese didn't enroll in the next championship and was relegated to Eccellenza after the refoundation.)
4	Casertana (P)	34	17	8	9	55	37	+18	59	Promotion to Lega Pro Seconda Divisione (Note: Casertana was promoted to Lega Pro Seconda Divisione to fill the vacancies created.)
5	Ostia Mare	34	16	8	10	57	39	+18	56	Qualification for Promotion play-off
6	Lupa Frascati	34	14	14	6	57	39	+18	56	Qualification for Promotion play-off
7	San Basilio Palestrina	34	15	10	9	50	38	+12	55	
8	Sora	35	14	8	13	53	41	+12	50	
9	Cynthia	34	11	12	11	45	43	+2	45	
10	Arzachena	34	10	12	12	45	46	−1	42	
11	Isola Liri	34	11	8	15	23	37	−14	41	
12	Porto Torres	34	8	15	11	34	40	−6	39	
13	Budoni	34	9	10	15	36	47	−11	37	Qualification for Relegation play-off (Note: Budoni remained in the league to fill the vacancies created.)
14	Anziolavinio	34	9	8	17	38	53	−15	35	Qualification for Relegation play-off (Note: Anziolavinio remained in the league to fill the vacancies created.)
15	Real Hyria Nola (R)	34	7	12	15	38	55	−17	32 (Note: Real Hyria Nola was docked 1 point for financial irregularities.)	Excluded from italian football after transfer sports title (Note: Real Hyria Nola gave its sports title to Real Vico and was excluded from italian football.)
16	Selargius	34	8	8	18	42	66	−24	32	Qualification for Relegation play-off
17	Civitavecchia (R)	34	7	12	15	32	67	−35	27 (Note: Civitavecchia was docked 1 point for late payment of the former footballer Antony Tremiterra. Civitavecchia was docked 5 points for financial irregularities.)	Relegation to Eccellenza
18	Progetto Sant'Elia (R)	34	5	8	21	34	71	−37	23	Relegation to Eccellenza

Updated to match(es) played on 5 May 2013. Source:
Rules for classification: 1) points; 2) goal difference; 3) number of goals scored.
(C) Champions; (P) Promoted; (R) Relegated

=== Girone H ===
==== Teams ====
Teams from Apulia, Basilicata & Campania

Club	City	Stadium	Capacity	2011–12 season
Battipagliese	Battipaglia	Luigi Pastena	7,000	3rd in Serie D Girone I
Bisceglie	Bisceglie	Gustavo Ventura	5,000	3rd in Eccellenza Apulia
Brindisi	Brindisi	Franco Fanuzzi	7,600	5th in Serie D Girone H
Campania	Piscinola (Naples) (playing in Secondigliano)	Barassi	1,000	8th in Serie D Girone H
Città di Potenza	Potenza	Alfredo Viviani	5,500	1st in Eccellenza Basilicata(as Atletico Potenza)
Foggia	Foggia	Pino Zaccheria	25,000	11th in Lega Pro Prima Divisione A
Fortis Trani	Trani	Comunale	10,700	11th in Serie D Girone H
Francavilla	Francavilla in Sinni	Nunzio Fittipaldi	1,200	7th in Serie D Girone H
Gladiator	Santa Maria Capua Vetere	Mario Piccirillo	4,000	6th in Serie D Girone I(as Nuvla San Felice)
Grottaglie	Grottaglie	D'Amuri	1,200	14th in Serie D Girone H
Ischia	Ischia	Vincenzo Mazzella	5,000	4th in Serie D Girone H
Matera	Matera	XXI Settembre-Franco Salerno	8,500	13th in Serie D Girone H(as Irsinese Matera)
MonosPolis	Monopoli	Vito Simone Veneziani	6,880	1st in Eccellenza Apulia(as Monopoli)
Nardò	Nardò	Giovanni Paolo II	5,000	10th in Serie D Girone H
Pomigliano	Pomigliano d'Arco	Ugo Gobbato	2,500	3rd in Serie D Girone G
Puteolana Internapoli	Pozzuoli	Domenico Conte	12,000	12th in Serie D Girone H(as Internapoli Città di Marano)
Sant'Antonio Abate	Sant'Antonio Abate	Comunale	1,900	11th in Serie D Girone I
Taranto	Taranto	Erasmo Iacovone	27,584	2nd in Lega Pro Prima Divisione A

==== League table ====
Pos	Team	Pld	W	D	L	GF	GA	GD	Pts	Promotion or qualification
1	Ischia (C, P)	34	28	2	4	74	19	+55	86	Promotion to Lega Pro Seconda Divisione
2	Gladiator	34	19	12	3	58	26	+32	69	Qualification for Promotion play-off
3	Matera	34	22	4	8	68	38	+30	68 (Note: Matera was docked 2 points for financial irregularities.)	Qualification for Promotion play-off
4	MonosPolis	34	19	8	7	60	30	+30	65	Qualification for Promotion play-off
5	Foggia (P)	34	15	13	6	53	34	+19	58	Promotion to Lega Pro Seconda Divisione (Note: Foggia was promoted to Lega Pro Seconda Divisione to fill the vacancies created.)
6	Bisceglie	34	16	8	10	57	41	+16	56	
7	Taranto	34	14	8	12	50	46	+4	50	
8	Brindisi	34	11	11	12	45	44	+1	44	
9	Campania (R)	35	11	12	12	34	35	−1	45 (Note: The score of Battipagliese-CTL Campania was transformed by sports judgment from 1–1 to 0–3 for infringement of the rule on under.)	Excluded from italian football after transfer sports title (Note: Campania gave its sports title to Real Vico and was excluded from italian football.)
10	Francavilla	34	12	8	14	49	53	−4	44	
11	Battipagliese	34	12	7	15	44	47	−3	43	
12	Pomigliano	34	11	10	13	33	38	−5	43	
13	Puteolana Internapoli	34	11	9	14	39	43	−4	42	
14	Nardò	34	10	11	13	34	38	−4	41 (Note: Nardò and Sant'Antonio Abate were docked 1 point for financial irregularities.)	Qualification for Relegation play-off
15	Sant'Antonio Abate (R)	34	9	11	14	38	43	−5	37 (Note: Sant'Antonio Abate was docked 1 point for non payment of the former coach Antonio Rogazzo.)	Qualification for Relegation play-off
16	Grottaglie	34	7	8	19	35	68	−33	29	Qualification for Relegation play-off (Note: Grottaglie remained in the league to fill the vacancies created.)
17	Fortis Trani	34	2	6	26	16	75	−59	12	Didn't enroll in the next championship (Note: Fortis Trani didn't enroll in the next championship and disappeared from the Italian football.)
18	Città di Potenza	34	2	3	29	17	85	−68	9	Didn't enroll in the next championship (Note: Città di Potenza didn't enroll in the next championship and disappeared from the Italian football.)

Updated to match(es) played on 5 May 2013. Source:
Rules for classification: 1) points; 2) goal difference; 3) number of goals scored.
(C) Champions; (P) Promoted; (R) Relegated

=== Girone I ===
==== Teams ====
Teams from Calabria, Campania & Sicily

Club	City	Stadium	Capacity	2011–12 season
Acireale	Acireale	Tupparello	8,000	14th in Serie D Girone I
Agropoli	Agropoli	Raffaele Guariglia	5,000	1st in Eccellenza Campania Girone B
Città di Messina	Messina	Giovanni Celeste	11,900	2nd in Eccellenza Sicily Girone B
Comprensorio Normanno	Paternò	Falcone-Borsellino	4,000	9th in Serie D Girone I(as Adrano)
Cosenza	Cosenza	San Vito	24,479	2nd in Serie D Girone I
Gelbison Cilento	Vallo della Lucania	G. Morra	4,000	12th in Serie D Girone I
Licata	Licata	Dino Liotta	11,000	8th in Serie D Girone I
Messina	Messina	San Filippo	37,895	4th in Serie D Girone I
Montalto Uffugo	Montalto Uffugo (playing in Paola)	Comunale	2,500	1st in Eccellenza Calabria
Nissa	Caltanissetta	Marco Tomaselli	11,950	16th in Serie D Girone I
Noto	Noto	Polisportivo Palatucci	5,000	7th in Serie D Girone I
Palazzolo	Palazzolo Acreide	Alessandro Scrofani Salustro	1,300	5th in Serie D Girone I
Pro Cavese	Cava de' Tirreni	Simonetta Lamberti	15,200	3rd in Eccellenza Campania Girone B(as Città de la Cava)
Ragusa	Ragusa	Aldo Campo	3,500	1st in Eccellenza Sicily Girone B
Ribera	Ribera	Nino Novara	2,500	1st in Eccellenza Sicily Girone A
Sambiase	Lamezia Terme	Guido D'Ippolito	2,000	10th in Serie D Girone I
Savoia	Torre Annunziata	Alfredo Giraud	10,750	1st in Eccellenza Campania Girone A
Vibonese	Vibo Valentia	Luigi Razza	4,500	17th in Lega Pro Seconda Divisione B

==== League table ====
Pos	Team	Pld	W	D	L	GF	GA	GD	Pts	Promotion or relegation
1	Messina (C, P)	34	23	8	3	59	24	+35	76 (Note: Acireale and Messina were docked 1 point for financial irregularities.)	Promotion to Lega Pro Seconda Divisione
2	Cosenza (P)	34	23	4	7	65	41	+24	73	Promotion to Lega Pro Seconda Divisione (Note: Cosenza was promoted to Lega Pro Seconda Divisione to fill the vacancies created.)
3	Città di Messina	34	17	7	10	56	41	+15	58	Qualification for Promotion play-off
4	Gelbison Cilento	34	16	10	8	38	28	+10	58	Qualification for Promotion play-off
5	Vibonese	34	14	9	11	41	31	+10	51 (Note: The score of Comprensorio Normanno-Vibonese was changed from 1-1 to 3-0 by sports judgment because the player calabrese Cibelli has played in this match despite being disqualified.)	Qualification for Promotion play-off
6	Comprensorio Normanno (R)	34	14	8	12	41	37	+4	50 (Note: The score of Agropoli-Comprensorio Normanno was changed from 2-3 to 0-3 by sports judgment because the player campano Cristian Altobello has played in this match despite being disqualified.)	Relegation to Eccellenza (Note: Comprensorio Normanno didn't enroll in the next championship and was relegated to Promozione.)
7	Savoia	34	13	9	12	54	53	+1	48	
8	Pro Cavese	34	11	14	9	47	38	+9	47	
9	Noto	34	14	7	13	47	36	+11	46 (Note: Noto was docked 3 points for an agreement occult with the former coach Lombardo.)	
10	Licata	34	12	10	12	50	46	+4	46	
11	Ribera	34	11	13	10	39	36	+3	46	Didn't enroll in the next championship (Note: Nissa and Ribera didn't enroll in the next championship and disappeared from the Italian football.)
12	Montalto Uffugo	34	11	12	11	45	38	+7	45	
13	Agropoli	34	12	8	14	36	38	−2	44	Qualification for Relegation play-off
14	Palazzolo A.S.D. (Note: Palazzolo moved to the city of Siracusa. It will play in the italian football as S.C. Siracusa.) (R)	34	12	8	14	44	46	−2	44	Qualification for Relegation play-off
15	Ragusa	34	9	12	13	38	42	−4	39	Qualification for Relegation play-off
16	Sambiase (R)	34	10	8	16	42	44	−2	38	Qualification for Relegation play-off
17	Acireale (R)	34	3	6	25	21	74	−53	15	Relegation to Eccellenza
18	Nissa	34	1	6	27	12	83	−71	8 (Note: Nissa was docked 1 point for non payment of the former footballer Dario Rocco.)	Didn't enroll in the next championship

Updated to match(es) played on 5 May 2013. Source:
Rules for classification: 1) points; 2) goal difference; 3) number of goals scored.
(C) Champions; (P) Promoted; (R) Relegated

== Divisions ==
=== Champions of winter and Promotions ===
All teams promoted to Lega Pro Seconda Divisione 2013–14.

Division	Champions of winter	Promotions
A	Bra	Bra
B	Pontisola	Pergolettese
C	Virtus Verona	Delta Porto Tolle
D	Atletico Pro Piacenza	Tuttocuoio
E	Sansepolcro	Castel Rigone
F	San Cesareo	Sambenedettese
G	Torres	Torres
H	Ischia	Ischia
I	Messina	Messina

== Scudetto Dilettanti ==
=== First round ===
- division winners placed into 3 groups of 3
- group winners and best second-placed team qualify for semi-finals

==== Group 1 ====
Pos	Team	Pld	W	D	L	GF	GA	GD	Pts
1	Bra (A)	2	1	1	0	4	3	+1	4
2	Delta Porto Tolle (C)	2	1	1	0	4	3	+1	4
3	Pergolettese (B)	2	0	0	2	0	2	−2	0

Pergolettese (B)	0–1	(C) Delta Porto Tolle	played on May 8, 2013
Bra (A)	1–0	(B) Pergolettese	played on May 12, 2013
Delta Porto Tolle (C)	3–3	(A) Bra	played on May 15, 2013

==== Group 2 ====
Pos	Team	Pld	W	D	L	GF	GA	GD	Pts
1	Tuttocuoio (D)	2	2	0	0	4	0	+4	6
2	Castel Rigone (E)	2	1	0	1	3	3	0	3
3	Sambenedettese (F)	2	0	0	2	1	5	−4	0

Sambenedettese (F)	0–2	(D) Tuttocuoio	played on May 12, 2013
Castel Rigone (E)	3–1	(F) Sambenedettese	played on May 15, 2013
Tuttocuoio (D)	3–1	(E) Castel Rigone	played on May 19, 2013

==== Group 3 ====
Pos	Team	Pld	W	D	L	GF	GA	GD	Pts
1	Ischia (H)	2	0	2	0	2	2	0	2
2	Torres (G)	2	0	2	0	1	1	0	2
3	Messina (I)	2	0	2	0	1	1	0	2

Torres (G)	0–0	(I) Messina	played on May 12, 2013
Ischia (H)	1–1	(G) Torres	played on May 15, 2013
Messina (I)	1–1	(H) Ischia	played on May 19, 2013

=== Semi-finals ===
One leg played on May 23, 2013, on the neutral ground at Piancastagnaio, Stadio Comunale. If the games ending in a tie are extended to the penalty kicks without play extra time.

Team 1	Score	Team 2
Bra (A)	1–4	(H) Ischia
Tuttocuoio (D)	0–1	(C) Delta Porto Tolle

=== Final ===
One leg final will be played on May 25, 2013, on the neutral ground at Piancastagnaio, Stadio Comunale. If the games ending in a tie are extended to the penalty kicks without play extra time.

Team 1	Score	Team 2
Ischia (H)	2–1	(C) Delta Porto Tolle

Winner: Ischia

== Promotion playoffs ==
Promotion playoffs involved a total of 39 teams; four from each of the nine Serie D divisions (teams placed from 2nd through to 5th) with the best semifinalist, the finalist and the winner of Coppa Italia Serie D that are directly respectively admitted to the third, fourth round and the Semi-final.

=== Rules ===
==== First and second round ====
- The first two rounds were one-legged matches played in the home field of the best-placed team.
- The games ending in ties were extended to extra time. The higher classified team was declared the winner if the game was still tied after extra time. Penalty kicks were not taken.
- Round one matched 2nd & 5th-placed teams and 3rd & 4th-placed teams within each division.
- The two winners from each division played each other in the second round.

==== Third and fourth round ====
- The nine winners – one each from the nine Serie D divisions – were qualified with Arezzo, as the worst ranked semifinalist of Coppa Italia Serie D to the third round, that was played in one-legged match in the home field of the best-placed team.
- The five winners were qualified with Virtus Castelfranco, as the best ranked semifinalist of Coppa Italia Serie D to the fourth round, that was played in one-legged match in the home field of the best-placed team.
- The games ending in ties were extended to the penalty kicks, without play extra time.

==== Semi-finals and final ====
- The three 4th-round winners were qualified for the semifinal round, join with Torre Neapolis, as Coppa Italia Serie D winner.
- The semi-finals and the final, with the respective winners, were in a one-legged hosted in a neutral ground.
- The games ending in ties were extended to the penalty kicks, without play extra time.

==== Repechages ====
- The tournament results provided a list, starting with the winner, by which vacancies could be filled in Lega Pro Seconda Divisione.
- If the winner is not admitted in this league gets €30.000, the finalist instead €15.000 .

=== First round ===
- Played on May 12, 2013
- Single-legged matches played at best placed club home field: 2nd-placed team plays home 5th-placed team, 3rd-placed team plays home 4th placed team
- Games ending in a tie are extended to extra time, if still tied, the higher-classified team wins

Team 1	Score	Team 2
Santhià (A2)	1-1(aet)	(A5) Borgosesia
Chieri (A3)	0-1	(A4) Lavagnese
Pontisola (B2)	1-2	(B5) Lecco
Olginatese (B3)	2-0	(B4) Voghera
Pordenone (C2)	1-3	(C5) Real Vicenza
Sambonifacese (C3)	1-2	(C4) Virtus Verona
Massese (D2)	1-2	(D5) Pistoiese
Lucchese (D3)	0-2	(D4) Atletico Pro Piacenza
Casacastalda (E2)	1-2	(E5) Voluntas Spoleto
Viterbese (E3)	4-1	(E4) Sansepolcro
Termoli (F2)	1-2	(F5) Vis Pesaro
San Cesareo (F3)	0-3	(F4) Maceratese
Sarnese (G3)	0-3	(G6) Lupa Frascati
Casertana (G4)	6-4	(G5) Ostia Mare
Gladiator (H2)	2-4(aet)	(H5) Foggia
Matera (H3)	1-1(aet)	(H4) MonosPolis
Cosenza (I2)	1-0	(I5) Vibonese
Gelbison Cilento (I3)	2-0	(I4)Città di Messina

=== Second round ===
- Played on May 15, 2013
- Single-legged matches played at best placed club home field
- Games ending in a tie are extended to extra time, if still tied, the higher-classified team wins

Team 1	Score	Team 2
Santhià (A2)	3-2	(A4) Lavagnese
Olginatese (B3)	2-0	(B5) Lecco
Virtus Verona (C4)	1-0	(C5) Real Vicenza
Atletico Pro Piacenza (D4)	0-1(aet)	(D5) Pistoiese
Viterbese (E3)	3-0	(E5) Voluntas Spoleto
Maceratese (F4)	4-1	(F5) Vis Pesaro
Casertana (G4)	0-0(aet)	(G6) Lupa Frascati
Matera (H3)	3-1	(H5) Foggia
Cosenza (I2)	3-0	(I3) Gelbison Cilento

=== Third round ===
- Played on May 19, 2013
- Single-legged matches played at best placed club home field
- Games ending in a tie are extended to the penalty kicks without play extra time
- Arezzo qualified directly as the worst ranked semifinalist of Coppa Italia Serie D

Team 1	Score	Team 2
Cosenza (I2)	1-1 (1-4 pen.)	(G4) Casertana
Santhià (A2)	2-0	(D5) Pistoiese
Matera (H3)	2-0	(F4) Maceratese
Viterbese (E3)	4-2	(E9) Arezzo
Olginatese (B3)	1-2	(C4) Virtus Verona

=== Fourth round ===
- Played on May 26, 2013
- Single-legged matches will be played On neutral ground
- Games ending in a tie are extended to the penalty kicks without play extra time
- Virtus Castelfranco qualified directly as the best ranked semifinalist of Coppa Italia Serie D

Team 1	Score	Team 2
Santhià (A2)	1-1 (pen.3-5)	(C4) Virtus Verona
Matera (H3)	0-0 (pen.3-4)	(G4) Casertana
Viterbese (E3)	0-5	(D6) Virtus Castelfranco

=== Semi-finals ===
- Played on June 2, 2013
- On neutral ground
- Games ending in a tie are extended to the penalty kicks without play extra time
- Torre Neapolis qualified directly as the winner of Coppa Italia Serie D

Team 1	Score	Team 2
Virtus Castelfranco (D6)	2-3	(C4) Virtus Verona
Torre Neapolis (G2)	0-2	(G4) Casertana

=== Final ===
- Played on June 9, 2013
- On neutral ground

Team 1	Score	Team 2
Virtus Verona (C4)	3-1	(G4) Casertana

== Relegation playoffs ==
Played on May 19 & May 26, 2013
In case of aggregate tie score, higher classified team that plays the 2nd match in home wins, without extra time being played
Team highlighted in green is saved, other is relegated to Eccellenza

Team 1	Agg.	Team 2	1st leg	2nd leg
(A) Novese	3-2	Verbano	3-0	0-2
(A) Tortona Villalvernia	0-0	Asti (saved for best placed)	0-0	0-0
(C) Sanvitese	3-1	Cerea	1-1	2-0
(C) Giorgione	1-1	Montebelluna (saved for best placed)	1-1	0-0
(D) Virtus Pavullese	1-1	Riccione (saved for best placed)	0-0	1-1
(D) Castenaso Van Goof	2-2	Forcoli (saved for best placed)	1-1	1-1
(E) Flaminia Civita Castellana	3-2	Pontevecchio	1-1	2-1
(F) Celano	2-1	R.C. Angolana	0-0	2-1
(G) Selargius	3-2	Budoni	2-1	1-1
(G) Real Hyria Nola	5-3	Anziolavinio	3-1	2-2
(H) Sant'Antonio Abate	0-0	Nardò (saved for best placed)	0-0	0-0
(I) Sambiase	3-4	Agropoli	0-2	3-2
(I) Ragusa	2-1	Palazzolo	1-1	1-0
