= Alessandro Belleri =

Italian footballer (born 1985)

Personal information
- Date of birth: 10 February 1985 (age 41)
- Place of birth: Manerbio, Italy
- Height: 1.86 m (6 ft 1 in)
- Position: Striker

Youth career
- 2002–2005: Montichiari

Senior career*
Years	Team	Apps	(Gls)
2002–2005	Montichiari	59	(1)
2005–2007	Avellino	4	(0)
2006–2007	→ Giugliano (loan)	16	(1)
2007–2008	Solbiatese	5	(0)
2008–2010	Wacker Burghausen	40	(10)
2009	Wacker Burghausen II	12	(10)
2010	FC Oberneuland	13	(4)
2010–2011	Darfo Boario	28	(14)
2011–2012	Santhià		
2013–2014	Martina	16	(3)
2014–2016	Castellana	11	(2)
2016–2018	Cazzago Bornato		
2018–2019	ASCK Simbach/Inn	38	(21)
2019–2020	Fanfulla	9	(2)

International career
2004–2005	Italy U-20 Serie C		
- * Club domestic league appearances and goals

Alessandro Belleri (born 10 February 1985) is an Italian footballer who plays as a striker.

== Club career ==
Belleri began his professional career in 2005 with a move from AC Montichiari to Avellino on a free transfer. Over the next decade and a half, he played for numerous Italian and German clubs, often moving on free transfers. He had loan spells at Giugliano and Solbiasommese before permanent moves to clubs such as FC Oberneuland, Darfo Boario, Santhià, and Martina Franca. Notably, he transferred between Real Vicenza and Santhià in 2012–13, including a loan and its subsequent end. After a brief period without a club, he joined Crema in 2014, followed by stints at CazzagoBornato and Simbach in Germany. His final club was Fanfulla in Italy, where he played during the 2019–20 season before retiring in January 2020.

== International career ==
Belleri capped for Italy under-20 Serie C team from 2004 to 2005, in Mirop Cup.
