= Ivan Varone =

Italian footballer

Personal information
- Date of birth: 11 October 1992 (age 34)
- Place of birth: Naples, Italy
- Height: 1.84 m (6 ft 0 in)
- Position: Midfielder

Team information
- Current team: Giugliano

Senior career*
Years	Team	Apps	(Gls)
2009–2010	Boca Pietri Capri	2	(0)
2010–2012	Santarcangelo	24	(3)
2011–2012	→ Siena (loan)	0	(0)
2012	Virtus Pavullese	9	(0)
2012–2013	Castiglione	10	(0)
2013	Formigine	10	(0)
2013–2014	Olbia	10	(0)
2014–2015	Savona	7	(0)
2015	San Marino	12	(2)
2015–2016	Chieti	34	(1)
2016–2017	Racing Fondi	7	(0)
2017–2018	Ternana	23	(1)
2018–2019	Cosenza	3	(0)
2019	→ Carrarese (loan)	11	(0)
2019–2021	Reggiana	7	(0)
2021–2023	Panetolikos	11	(1)
2023	Novara	10	(0)
2023–2024	Cesena	33	(1)
2024–2025	Ascoli	36	(5)
2025–2026	Salernitana	12	(0)
2026	→ Gubbio (loan)	12	(2)
2026–	Giugliano	0	(0)
- * Club domestic league appearances and goals as of 29 August 2026

Ivan Varone (born 11 October 1992) is an Italian professional footballer who plays as a midfielder for Serie C Group C club Giugliano.

== Career ==
Varone made his Serie C debut for Savona on 31 August 2014 in a game against Ancona.

On 17 January 2019, he joined Carrarese on loan.

On 29 July 2019, he signed a 3-year contract with Reggio Audace.

On 17 February 2023, Varone joined Novara until the end of the season.

On 29 August 2023, Varone signed a two-year contract with Cesena.

On 7 August 2024, Varone moved to Ascoli on a two-year deal.
