= Giorgio Bertacchi =

Italian footballer (born 1990)

Personal information
- Date of birth: 15 May 1990 (age 36)
- Place of birth: Italy
- Position: Midfielder

Youth career
- –2009: Atalanta

Senior career*
Years	Team	Apps	(Gls)
2011–2013	Aurora Seriate	51	(10)
2013–2014	Sydney Olympic	2	(0)
2014–2015	Aurora Seriate	11	(0)
2016	Amicale		
2017–2019	Nardò	71	(5)
2019–2021	Scanzorosciate	35	(3)
2021–2022	Rovato		
2022–2023	Ospitaletto		
2023–	MapelloBonate		
- * Club domestic league appearances and goals

Giorgio Bertacchi (born 15 May 1990) is an Italian footballer who plays as a midfielder for MapelloBonate.

== Early life ==
Bertacchi was born in 1990 in Italy. He started playing football at the age of seven.

== Career ==
Bertacchi started his career with Italian side Aurora Seriate. In 2013, he signed for Australian side Sydney Olympic. In 2014, he returned to Italian side Aurora Seriate. In 2016, he signed for Vanuatuan side Amicale. He played in the OFC Champions League while playing for the club. In 2017, he signed for Italian side Nardò. He was regarded as one of the club's most important players. In 2019, he signed for Italian side Scanzorosciate. In 2021, he signed for Italian side Rovato. In 2022, he signed for Italian side Ospitaletto. In 2023, he signed for Italian side MapelloBonate.

== Style of play ==
Bertacchi mainly operated as a midfielder. He has received comparisons to Italy international Andrea Pirlo.

== Personal life ==
Bertacchi has had Vince Caligiuri as his agent. He is a native of Valtesse, Italy.
