= Jaroslav Šedivec =

Czech footballer

Personal information
- Date of birth: 16 February 1981 (age 45)
- Place of birth: Plzeň, Czechoslovakia
- Height: 1.81 m (5 ft 11 in)
- Position: Forward

Youth career
- Baník Zbůch
- Viktoria Plzeň

Senior career*
Years	Team	Apps	(Gls)
1998–2002	Viktoria Plzeň	53	(3)
2002–2004	Catania	39	(3)
2004–2005	Perugia	35	(6)
2005–2007	Crotone	64	(13)
2007–2010	Triestina	53	(2)
2008–2009	→ Mantova (loan)	28	(2)
2010–2011	Salernitana	6	(0)
2011–2012	FeralpiSalò	10	(0)
2012–2013	Bastia	16	(0)
2013–2014	Maccarese	7	(0)
2014	Atletico San Paolo	5	(0)
2014–2015	Portomansuè		
2015–2017	Sanvitese		
2018–2019	Fossaltese		

International career
2001	Czech Republic U20	7	(0)
2003	Czech Republic U21	1	(0)

Managerial career
- Real Vicenza (scout)
- * Club domestic league appearances and goals

Jaroslav Šedivec (born 16 February 1981) is a retired Czech footballer.

== Career ==
Born in Plzeň, in the modern border of the Czech Republic, Šedivec started his professional career in the local side of Plzeň. He arrived Italy in 2002 and played for several Serie B clubs. in 2007 he was signed by Triestina in co-ownership deal for €700,000 in 3-year contract. In June 2008 the club signed him outright for another €100,000.

He was the member of Czech Republic U20 team at 2001 FIFA World Youth Championship.
