= ASDP =

ASDP may refer to:

- ASDP Indonesia Ferry, a company of Indonesia
- Azerbaijani Social Democratic Party, a political party of Azerbaijan
- ASDP Ribera 1954, a former Italian football club based in Ribera, Sicily
- Old Social Democratic Party of Germany (German: Alte Sozialdemokratische Partei Deutschlands, ASPD), a political party in Germany dissolved in 1932
