= Manuel Marzupio =

Italian footballer

Personal information
- Date of birth: 5 April 2000 (age 26)
- Place of birth: Italy
- Height: 1.91 m (6 ft 3 in)
- Position: Centre back

Team information
- Current team: Club Milano

Youth career
- –2018: Inter Milan
- 2017–2018: → Virtus Bergamo (loan)

Senior career*
Years	Team	Apps	(Gls)
2018–2019	Virtus Bergamo	49	(1)
2019–2021	Cavese	22	(0)
2021–2023	Pro Sesto	39	(0)
2023–2025	Foggia	11	(0)
2025–	Club Milano	24	(0)
- * Club domestic league appearances and goals as of 25 June 2026

Manuel Marzupio (born 5 April 2000) is an Italian professional footballer who plays as a centre back for Serie D club Club Milano.

== Club career ==
On 16 July 2021, he joined Serie C club Pro Sesto-

On 11 August 2023, Marzupio signed a two-year contract with Foggia.
