= Maurizio Vella =

Italian-German footballer

Personal information
- Date of birth: 10 May 1991 (age 35)
- Place of birth: Mannheim, Germany
- Height: 1.69 m (5 ft 7 in)
- Position: Forward

Youth career
- –2010: Waldhof Mannheim

Senior career*
Years	Team	Apps	(Gls)
2010–2011	Mechtersheim		
2011	Ribera	16	(3)
2011–2012	Licata	41	(5)
2012–2014	Città di Messina	29	(12)
2014–2016	Juve Stabia	28	(1)
2015	→ L'Aquila (loan)	5	(0)
2016	Paganese	12	(1)
2016–2019	Floriana	39	(6)
2019–2020	Birkirkara	3	(0)
2020	Al Hamriyah		
- * Club domestic league appearances and goals as of 27 January 2018

Maurizio Vella (born 10 May 1991) is an Italian football player. He plays the forward position. He also holds German citizenship.

== Club career ==
He made his Serie C debut for Juve Stabia on 30 August 2014 in a game against Catanzaro.
