= Tortona Calcio =

Tortona Calcio may refer to one of two football clubs from Tortona:

- Derthona F.B.C. 1908, founded in 1908, currently in serie D.
- A.P.D. Tortona Villalvernia founded in 1983, currently in Serie D.
