= Pietro Pegollo =

Italian footballer

Personal information
- Full name: Pietro Pegollo
- Date of birth: 27 May 1993 (age 33)
- Place of birth: Massa, Italy
- Height: 1.88 m (6 ft 2 in)
- Position: Forward

Team information
- Current team: Camaiore

Youth career
- Livorno

Senior career*
Years	Team	Apps	(Gls)
2010–2012	Carrarese	7	(0)
2012–2013	Pietrasanta Marina	27	(10)
2013–2014	Massese	7	(0)
2014	Dalry Thistle	14	(15)
2015–2017	Seravezza	74	(27)
2018	Adelaide Blue Eagles	15	(11)
2018–2019	Seravezza	29	(9)
2019–	Camaiore	0	(0)
- * Club domestic league appearances and goals as of 23:19, 19 August 2019 (UTC)

Pietro Pegollo (born 27 May 1993), is an Italian professional footballer who plays as a forward for Camaiore.

== Career ==
Ahead of the 2019/20 season, Pegollo joined Camaiore Calcio ASD.
