= Balleri =

Balleri is an Italian surname. Notable people with the surname include:

- Costanzo Balleri (1933–2017), Italian footballer and coach
- David Balleri (born 1969), Italian footballer, son of Costanzo
- Mario Balleri (1902–1962), Italian rower

== See also ==
- Belleri
