= Belleri =

Belleri is an Italian surname. Notable people with the surname include:

- Alessandro Belleri (born 1985), Italian footballer
- Manuel Belleri (born 1977), Italian footballer

== See also ==
- Agonum belleri, a species of ground beetle in the Platyninae subfamily
