= Elena Aiello =

Italian blessed

Blessed Elena Aiello
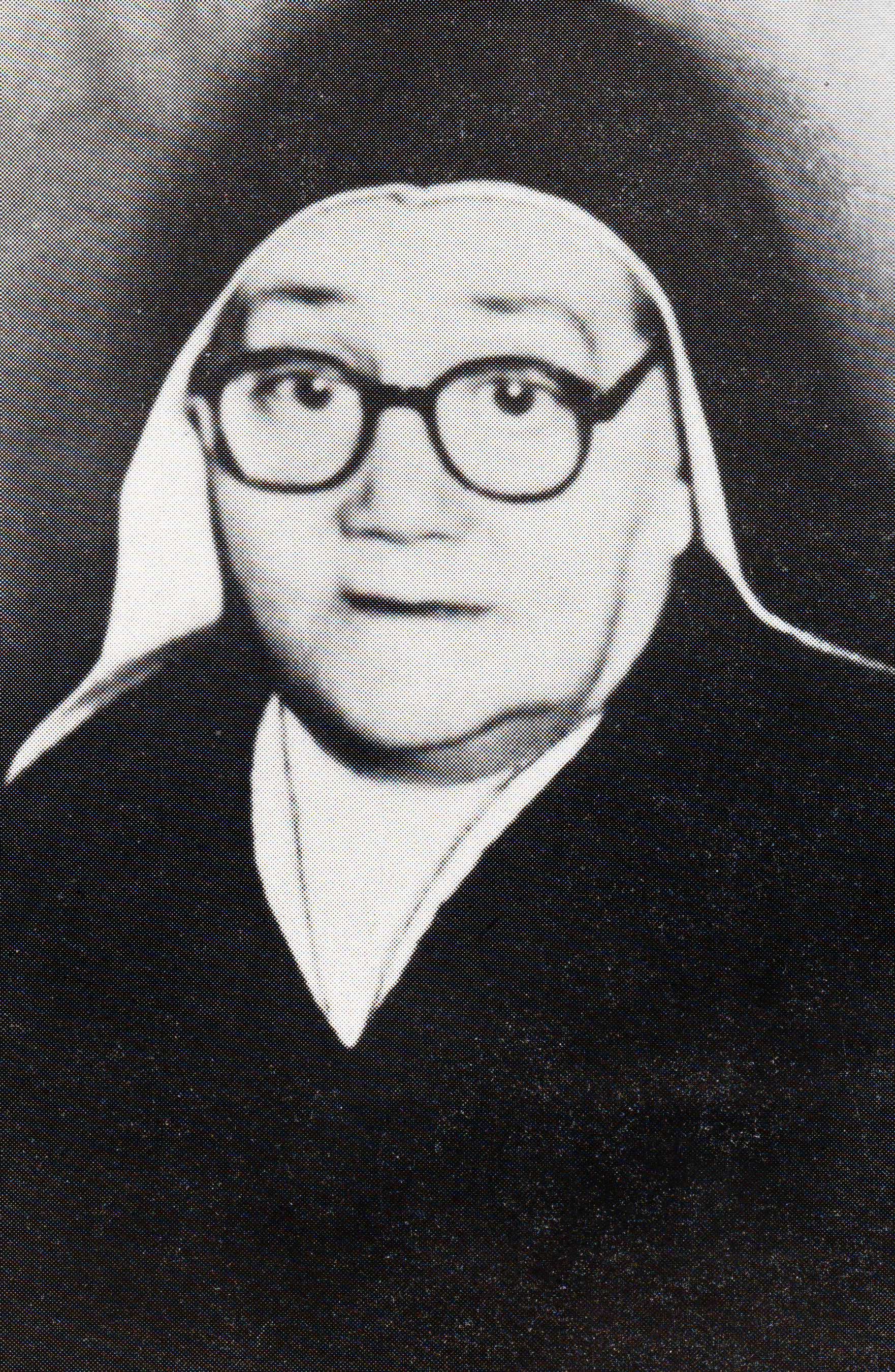
- Born: 10 April 1895; Montalto Uffugo, Cosenza
- Died: 19 June 1961 (aged 66); Rome
- Venerated in: Catholic Church
- Beatified: 14 September 2011, Stadio San Vito, Cosenza by Cardinal Angelo Amato (on behalf of Pope Benedict XVI)
- Feast: 19 June

Elena Aiello (10 April 1895 – 19 June 1961) was an Italian religious sister and the founder of the Minim Sisters of the Passion of Our Lord Jesus Christ. Aiello joined the Sisters of the Most Precious Blood but was forced to leave due to grave health that soon kept her confined to her home where she began experiencing visions of both Jesus Christ and the Blessed Virgin Mary as well as saints such as Francis of Paola. Her beatification was celebrated on 14 September 2011.

== Life ==
Elena Aiello was born on 10 April 1895 during Lent in Cosenza to Pasquale Aiello (22 February 1861 – 16 November 1955), a tailor, and Tereseina Paglilla (d. 1905) as the third of eight children, one died at one. She received her baptism from Father Francesco Benincasa on 15 April in the church of San Domenico as "Elena Emilia Santa Aiello", with her godmother being Maria Genise. During the Procession of Rogations, her mother said that if she had a daughter she would name her in honour of Saint Helena.

Her eldest sibling was Emma (b. 1889) and so followed Fernando (b. 1892), Evangelina Isabella Rosina (b. 1896), Elisa Emilia Geltrude (b. 1898) and Ida (b. 1903) in addition to two others.

Aiello made her First Communion on 21 June 1904 (the Passionist priest Timoteo presided over that event) after a spiritual retreat in preparation for that and she and some other girls later obtained permission to wear a penitential belt. En route to receive the belt she had an accident that saw two front teeth lost but she put them in her handkerchief and continued on the path to receive it despite the pain. Another occasion saw her inhale water from a glass she had in her hand while laughing and this caused a constant cough for over fourteen months at night and her voice volume decreased due to this; treatment made it worse. Aiello begged that the Madonna heal her and she came to her in a vision at night and assured her that it would be so. Her mother died in 1905. She received her Confirmation aged eleven from Bishop Camillo Sorgente and her sponsor was Donna Agnesina Turano.

Her desire to become a religious was stalled, for her father asked her to stall this until a more appropriate time due to World War I which was raging in Europe at the time. She instead focused on aiding refugees and on impacted victims. On one occasion she met a Freemason named Alessandro and failed to persuade him to receive the sacraments. She continued to persuade him, but he instead took a bottle and flung it at her which struck her neck that bled. Aiello held a cloth to it and told him his soul was in danger and would not leave the room until he called for a priest to come in. Alessandro became so moved that he told her that he would receive the sacraments if she continued to tend to him; she did so for three months.

In 1920 she joined the Sisters of the Most Precious Blood (her father directed her to that specific order for an unknown reason) but was later forced to leave that order due to a necrotic shoulder. She had her shoulder operated on without anesthetic while she held a small wooden cross and looking at a Marian image but the inept doctor cut nerves that caused her lockjaw and a vomiting spell for several weeks. Aiello could not partake in the vesting, for her superior saw her situation to be so bad she could not participate in it, which forced her departure. The doctor told her father to sue the order for her ailments (her shoulder now had gangrene setting in) but she convinced him not to do so.

Aiello also was diagnosed with stomach cancer and could not retain even liquefied food which prompted her doctor to deem her condition incurable. She placed her faith in Saint Rita of Cascia for a cure which happened. The conditions were healed all of a sudden in 1921, and Saint Rita herself appeared to Aiello in a dream one night.

Aiello began experiencing the stigmata each Good Friday from 1923 to not long before her death. The first time that happened the Lord appeared in a white garment with the crown of thorns and placed it on her head prompting much blood to gush forth. The servant, Rosaria, was about to leave the house when she heard wailing and was petrified to see Aiello covered in blood believing someone murdered her. Rosaria rushed to get Aiello's relations who saw the blood but saw she was still alive and so contacted the doctor and several priests. The doctor attempted to halt the bleeding but could not do so for three hours.

The sister also started experiencing visions of the Blessed Mother in 1927; she made predictions of future events following these visions. Aiello also experienced visions of Jesus Christ in addition to saints such as Francis of Paola and Thérèse of Lisieux. On 28 January 1928, she founded a new religious order that she named the Minim Sisters of the Passion of Our Lord Jesus Christ. Pope Pius XII knew of Aiello and was the one who issued pontifical approval for the order in July 1949.

On 22 April 1940, the Lord told her to deliver a message to Benito Mussolini to tell him not to join Adolf Hitler during World War II for such a joining would bring both terrible defeat and divine punishment upon the Italian people. A few days later on 6 May 1940 she forwarded this message to Mussolini in the form of a letter. Unfortunately the letter was ignored by Mussolini and never replied to.

Aiello died at dawn at 6:19 am on 19 June 1961 in Rome; she had received extreme unction at 2:00 am. Her remains were interred in the motherhouse of her order.

== Beatification ==
The beatification process opened on 7 January 1982. Pope John Paul II titled her as venerable on 22 January 1991. Pope Benedict XVI decreed the healing to be a miracle on 2 April 2011 and thus confirmed her beatification; Cardinal Angelo Amato presided over the celebration on the pope's behalf on 14 September 2011. The postulator for this cause is Enzo Gabrieli.

== Sources ==
- Freze, Michael (1993). Voices, Visions, and Apparitions. Our Sunday Visitor, Publishing Division. p. 247. ISBN 0-87973-454-X.
- Watkins, Basil (2015). The Book of Saints: A Comprehensive Biographical Dictionary (8 ed.). Bloomsbury Publishing. ISBN 978-0-567-66415-0.
