= Castenaso =

- Comune
- Comune di Castenaso
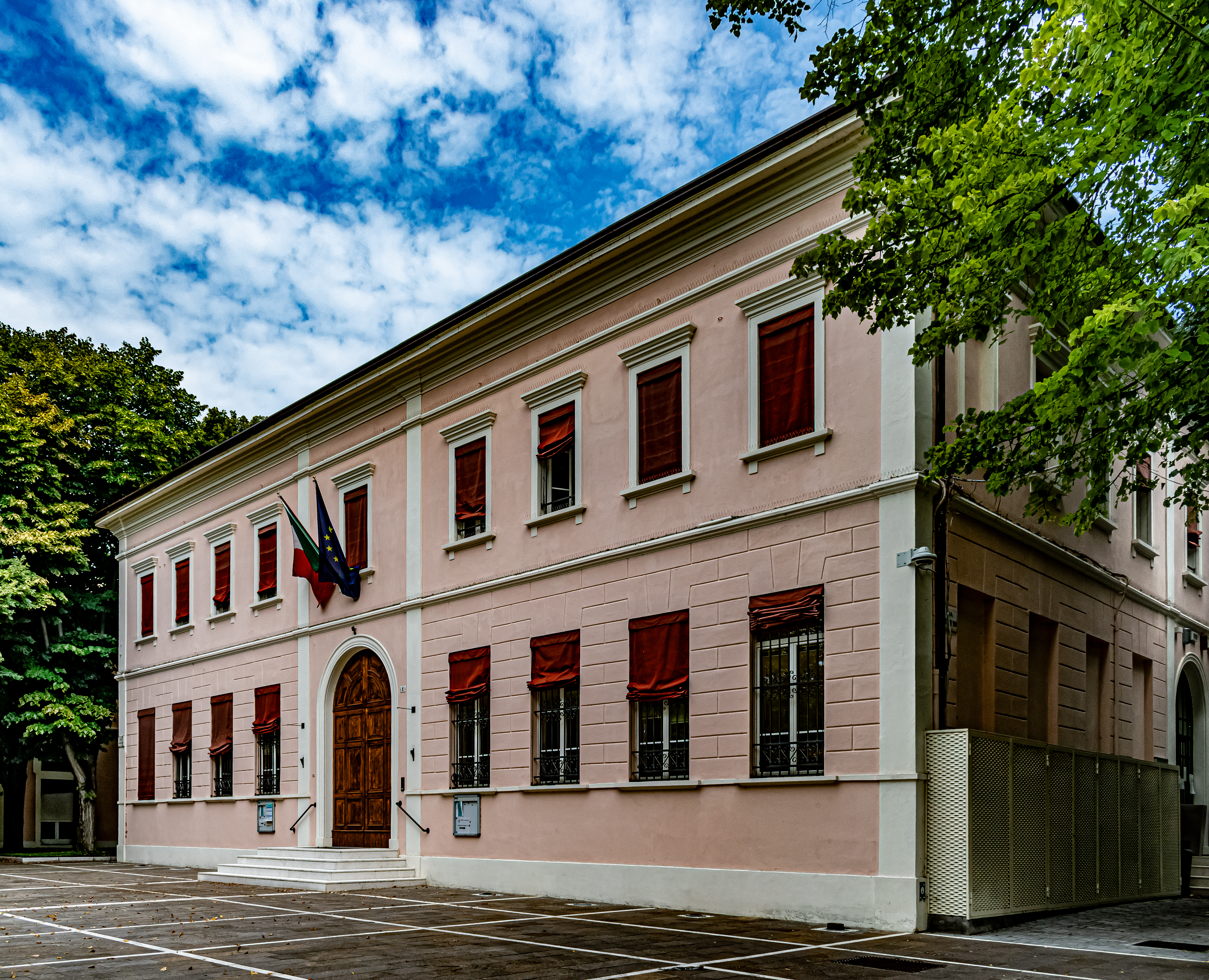
- Town hall.

- Location within Italy Location within Emilia-Romagna
- Coordinates: 44°30′35″N 11°28′14″E
- Country: Italy
- Region: Emilia-Romagna
- Metropolitan city: Bologna (BO)
- Frazioni: Fiesso, Veduro, Villanova, Marano

Government
  - Mayor: Carlo Gubellini

Area
  - Total: 35.73 km^{2} (13.80 sq mi)
- Elevation: 42 m (138 ft)

Population (31 December 2019)
  - Total: 15,686
  - Density: 439.0/km^{2} (1,137/sq mi)
- Demonym: Castenasensi
- Time zone: UTC+1 (CET)
  - Summer (DST): UTC+2 (CEST)
- Postal code: 40055, 40050
- Dialing code: 051
- Website: Official website

Castenaso (Bolognese: Castnès; Latin: Castrum Nasicae) is a town and comune in the Metropolitan City of Bologna, Emilia-Romagna, Italy. It is located around 12 kilometres (7 miles) away from Bologna, the capital of Emilia Romagna.

== Sports ==
Associazione Sportiva Dilettantistica Castenaso Villanova is the main association football club based in the city.

== Sources ==
- Official website
