= USD FiesoleCaldine =

Italian football club

FiesoleCaldine
- Full name: Unione Sportiva Dilettantistica FiesoleCaldine
- Founded: 1999
- Ground: Stadio Poggioloni, Fiesole, Italy
- Capacity: 700
- Chairman: (Italy) Marco Ungar
- Manager: (Italy) Stefano Carobbi
- League: Serie D/E
- 2012–13: Serie D/E, 8th
Home colours	Away colours

Unione Sportiva Dilettantistica FiesoleCaldine is an Italian football club based in Fiesole, Tuscany. Currently it plays in Italy's Serie D.

== History ==
=== Foundation ===
The club was founded in 1999 after the merger between G.S. Caldine (founded in 1922) and G.S. Fiesole (founded in 1958).

=== Serie D ===
In the season 2011–12 the team was promoted from Eccellenza Tuscany/B to Serie D.

== Colors and badge ==
The team's colors are the blue light of G.S. Caldine and the green of G.S. Fiesole.

== Honours ==
- Eccellenza:
  - Winner (1): 2011–12
