= ASD Atletico Castenaso Van Goof =

Italian association football club

Atletico Castenaso
- Full name: Associazione Sportiva Dilettantistica Atletico Castenaso Van Goof
- Founded: 2012
- Dissolved: 2026
- Ground: Stadio G. Negrini, Castenaso, Italy
- Capacity: 1,200
- 2012–13: Serie D/D, 15th (relegated after play-off)
Home colours	Away colours

Associazione Sportiva Dilettantistica Atletico Castenaso Van Goof is an Italian association football club, based in Castenaso, Emilia-Romagna.

== History ==
=== Atletico Castenaso Van Goof ===
The club was founded in 2012 after the merger between A.S.D. Castenaso Villanova and A.S.C. Atletico Van Goof.

=== Before the merger ===
==== Castenaso Villanova ====
A.S.D. Castenaso Villanova in the season 2011–12 was promoted for the first time, from Eccellenza Emilia-Romagna/B to Serie D.

==== A.S.C. Atletico Van Goof ====
A.S.C. Atletico Van Goof was founded in 1997 as a semi-serious initiative by the creators of the famous football entertainment TV show Quelli che... il Calcio, journalists Fabio Fazio and Marino Bartoletti. It started in Terza Categoria Bologna and in the season 2004–05 was promoted to Eccellenza Emilia-Romagna, but was immediately relegated to Promozione Emilia-Romagna. In the season 2011–12 it was even relegated to Promozione Emilia-Romagna.

== Colors and badge ==
Its colors are red and blue.
