= Besozzo =

- Comune
- Comune di Besozzo
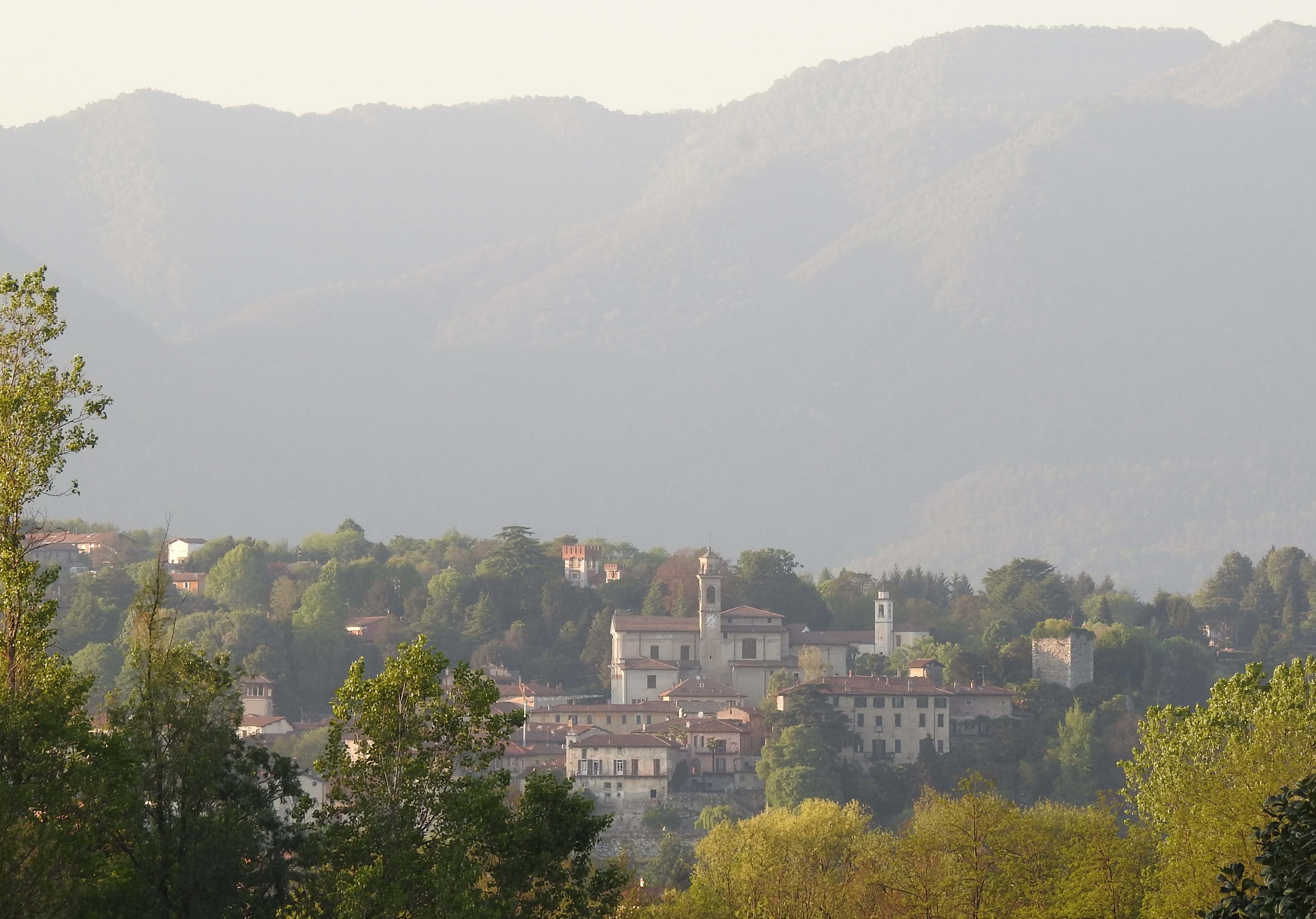
- View of Besozzo

- Location within Italy Location within Lombardy
- Coordinates: 45°51′N 08°40′E
- Country: Italy
- Region: Lombardy
- Province: Varese (VA)
- Frazioni: Bogno, Cardana, Olginasio

Area
  - Total: 13 km^{2} (5.0 sq mi)

Population (31 December 2004)
  - Total: 8,793
  - Density: 680/km^{2} (1,800/sq mi)
- Time zone: UTC+1 (CET)
  - Summer (DST): UTC+2 (CEST)
- Postal code: 21023
- Dialing code: 0332

Besozzo is a town and municipality located in the province of Varese, in the Lombardy region of northern Italy. Besozzo hosts a small historical centre with churches and noble houses, so-called Palazzi, in its upper part which is in part pedestrian zone, and a vivid modern centre with shops, cafes, banks etc. in its lower part. The village is situated in the region of the lakes, with Lago Maggiore being only 6 kilometres (4 mi) away, and features views of the Alps.

Besozzo has a train station on the Luino–Milan railway, and a fast road linking it to the Italian highway system. As many surrounding villages, it has grown considerably and it still doing so, in part because of families moving from Milan to region of lakes and becoming commuters.

Besozzo is close to the Ispra site of the European Union's Joint Research Centre.

== See also ==
- F.C. Verbano Calcio
