= ASD Fersina Perginese =

Italian football club

Fersina Perginese
- Full name: Associazione Sportiva Dilettantistica Fersina Perginese
- Founded: 2009
- Ground: Stadio Comunale, Pergine Valsugana, Italy
- Capacity: 2,000
- Chairman: Elvis Ormenese
- Manager: Roberto Cortese
- League: Serie D/C
- 2012–13: Serie D/B, 15th
Home colours	Away colours

A.S.D. Fersina Perginese is an Italian association football, and the major football club in Pergine Valsugana, Trentino-Alto Adige/Südtirol. Currently it plays in Italy's Serie D.

== History ==
=== Foundation ===
The club was founded in 2009 after the merger with the teams of A.S. Fersina and A.C. Perginese.

=== Serie D ===
In the season 2011–12 the team was promoted from Eccellenza Trentino-Alto Adige/Südtirol to Serie D.

== Colors and badge ==
The team's colors are yellow and black.

== Honours ==
- Eccellenza Trentino-Alto Adige/Südtirol:
  - Winner (1): 2011–12
- Regional Coppa Italia Trentino-Alto Adige/Südtirol:
  - Winner (2): 2010–11, 2011–12
