= San Cesareo =

- Comune
- Comune di San Cesareo
- Location within Italy Location within Lazio
- Coordinates: 41°49′N 12°48′E
- Country: Italy
- Region: Lazio
- Metropolitan city: Rome (RM)
- Frazioni: Campo Gillaro, Colle Noce, Colle San Pietro, La Vetrice, Prato Rinaldo

Government
  - Mayor: Alessandra Sabelli

Area
  - Total: 23.64 km^{2} (9.13 sq mi)
- Elevation: 312 m (1,024 ft)

Population (30 September 2017)
  - Total: 15,557
  - Density: 658.1/km^{2} (1,704/sq mi)
- Demonym: Sancesaresi
- Time zone: UTC+1 (CET)
  - Summer (DST): UTC+2 (CEST)
- Postal code: 00030
- Dialing code: 06
- Patron saint: St. Caesarius
- Saint day: 27 August
- Website: Official website

San Cesareo (Latin: Ad Statuas or Statio ad Statuas) is a town and comune in the Metropolitan City of Rome. In ancient times, it was on the Via Labicana or Via Latina, 29 kilometres (18 mi) from Rome.

== Sports ==
A.S.D. San Cesareo Calcio is an Italian association football club, based in this city. In the 2011–12 season, the team was promoted for the first time, from Eccellenza Lazio/B to Serie D.
