= AS Deruta =

Italian football club

Deruta
- Full name: Associazione Sportiva Deruta
- Founded: 1926
- Ground: Stadio Comunale, Deruta, Italy
- Capacity: 600
- Chairman: Marcello Pastorelli, Antonio Ciotti, Mauro Liberti
- Manager: Davio Mattoni
- League: Serie D/E
- 2012–13: Serie D/E, 6th
Home colours	Away colours

Associazione Sportiva Deruta is an Italian association football club located in Deruta, Umbria. It currently plays in Serie D.

== History ==
The club was founded in 1926.

== Colors and badge ==
Its colors are white and blue.
