= SS Comprensorio Montalto Uffugo Calcio =

Italian football club

Montalto Uffugo
- Full name: Società Sportiva Comprensorio Montalto Uffugo Calcio
- Founded: 1920
- Ground: Comunale, Montalto Uffugo, Italy
- Capacity: 2,500
- Chairman: Francesco De Caro
- Manager: Franco Giugno
- League: Serie D/I
- 2012–13: Serie D/I, 12th
Home colours	Away colours

S.S. Comprensorio Montalto Uffugo Calcio is an Italian association football is an Italian association football club, based in Montalto Uffugo, Calabria. It currently plays in Serie D.

== History ==
In the season 2011–12 the team was promoted for the first time, from Eccellenza Calabria to Serie D.

== Colors and badge ==
The colors of the team are white and blue.
