= GSD RapalloBogliasco =

Italian football club

RapalloBogliasco
- Full name: Gruppo Sportivo Dilletantistico RapalloBogliasco
- Founded: 2013
- Ground: Umberto Macera, Rapallo, Italy & Stadio Comunale, Santa Margherita Ligure
- Capacity: 250 & 1,100
- Chairman: Giuseppe Perpignano
- Manager: Marco Sesia
- League: Serie D/A
- 2012–13: Serie D/A, 10th (as Bogliasco)
Home colours	Away colours

Gruppo Sportivo Dilettantistico RapalloBogliasco, or simply RapalloBogliasco, is an Italian association football club, based in Rapallo and Bogliasco, Liguria. RapalloBogliasco currently plays in Serie D.

== History ==
=== Before the merger ===
Bogliasco D'Albertis was founded in 1950.

In the season 2010–11 Bogliasco D’albertis was promoted, for the first time, from Eccellenza Liguria to Serie D.

==== Serie D 2011–12 ====
In the 2011–12 season Bogliasco D’albertis gained access to the Serie D promotion play-off with direct admission to the 3rd round as best semifinalist of Coppa Italia Serie D, where it was eliminated by Atletico Arezzo.

==== Honours ====
- Coppa Italia Liguria
  - Champions (1): 2010–11

=== Merger with A.S.D. Calcio Giovanile Rapallo ===
In the 2013 summer Bogliasco D’albertis merged with A.S.D. Calcio Giovanile Rapallo and formed a new team, G.S.D. RapalloBogliasco that plays in the Serie D championship.

== Colors and badge ==
The team's colors are black and white.
