= US Forcoli Calcio 1921 ASD =

Italian football club

Forcoli
- Full name: Unione Sportiva Forcoli Calcio 1921 Associazione Sportiva Dilettantistica
- Founded: 1921
- Ground: Stadio Guido Brunner, Forcoli-Palaia, Italy
- Capacity: 1,000
- Chairman: Paolo Pastacaldi
- Manager: Stefano Brondi
- League: Serie D/D
- 2012–13: Serie D/D, 14th
Home colours	Away colours

Unione Sportiva Forcoli Calcio 1921 Associazione Sportiva Dilettantistica is an Italian association football club located in Forcoli, a frazione of Palaia, Tuscany. It currently plays in Serie D.

== History ==
The club was founded in 1921.

The team in the season 1999–2000 was promoted from Promozione Tuscany to Eccellenza and in the season 2003–04 from Eccellenza Tuscany to Serie D.

== Colors and badge ==
Its colors are white and dark red.
