= FC Verbano Calcio =

Italian football club

Verbano
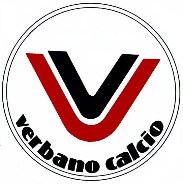
- Full name: Football Club Verbano Calcio
- Founded: 1979
- Ground: Stadio Comunale, Besozzo, Italy
- Chairman: Pietro Barbarito
- Manager: Paolo Pacciarotti
- League: Eccellenza Lombardy
- 2012–13: Serie D/A, 13th
Home colours	Away colours

Football Club Verbano Calcio, or simply Verbano, is an Italian association football club, based in Besozzo, Lombardy. Verbano currently plays in Eccellenza.

== History ==
The club was founded in 1979 after the merger of Unione Sportiva Besozzo (founded in 1905) and N.A.G.C. Sant’Andrea (founded in 1927).

At the end of the 2010–11 Eccellenza season, Verbano was promoted by repechage to Serie D for the first time.

In the 2012–13 Serie D the club was relegated to eccellenza.

== Colors and badge ==
The team's colors are red and black.
