= ASD Fortis Juventus 1909 =

Italian association football club

Fortis Juventus
- Full name: Associazione Sportiva Dilettantistica Fortis Juventus 1909
- Founded: 1909
- Ground: Stadio Romanelli, Borgo San Lorenzo, Italy
- Capacity: 1,915
- Chairman: Marcello Banchi
- Manager: Vitaliano Bonuccelli
- League: Serie D/D
- 2012–13: Serie D/D, 11th
Home colours	Away colours

Associazione Sportiva Dilettantistica Fortis Juventus 1909 is an Italian association football club located in Borgo San Lorenzo, Tuscany. Currently it plays in Italy's Serie D.

== History ==
The club was founded in 1909.

In the season 2010–11, from Serie D group E the team was relegated to Eccellenza.

At the end of the 2011–12 Eccellenza season, it was promoted by repechage to Serie D to fill the vacancies created.

== Colors and badge ==
Its colors are white and green.
