= Progetto Calcio Sant'Elia =

Italian football club

- Full name: Associazione Sportiva Dilettantistica Progetto Calcio Sant'Elia
- Founded: 1998 (as Pol. Cms Sant'Elia)
- Dissolved: 2015
- Ground: Campo Comunale Sant'Elia, Cagliari, Italy
- Capacity: 300
Home colours	Away colours

Associazione Sportiva Dilettantistica Progetto Sant'Elia or simply Progetto Sant'Elia was an Italian association football club, based in the district Sant'Elia of Cagliari, Sardinia.

== History ==
The club was founded in 1998. After several years in the regional championships, in the 2010–11 season they won Eccellenza Sardinia and so were promoted to Serie D for the first time. In its first Serie D season, in 2011–12, the company avoided relegation against Monterotondo in the playoff (after finishing the season in fifteenth place). Progetto Calcio Sant'Elia has been relegated in the 2012–13 season to Eccellenza Sardinia.

The club bankrupt in 2015.

== Colours and badge ==
The team's colours were blue and white.
