= USD Noto Calcio =

Italian football club

Noto
- Full name: Unione Sportiva Dilettantistica Noto Calcio
- Founded: 1963
- Ground: Giovanni Palatucci, Noto, Italy
- Capacity: 7,021
- Chairman: Giovanni Musso
- Manager: Giancarlo Betta
- League: Serie D/I
- 2012–13: Serie D/I, 9th
Home colours	Away colours

Unione Sportiva Dilettantistica Noto Calcio is an Italian association football club located in Noto, Sicily. It currently plays in Serie D.

== History ==
The club was founded in 1963 as Netina.

In summer 1980 it was merged with Franco Mola and was renamed with the current name.

In the 2009–10 season of Eccellenza Sicily/B it was promoted to Serie D.

The sports center at which the known football matches internal dispute arises in Contrada Zupparda less than a mile from the town of Noto. The structure is dedicated to the memory of Giovanni Palatucci.
