= ASD San Cesareo Calcio =

Italian football club

San Cesareo
- Full name: Associazione Sportiva Dilettantistica San Cesareo Calcio
- Founded: 1967
- Ground: Comunale, San Cesareo, Italy
- Capacity: 1,744
- Chairman: Guglielmo Carpentieri
- Manager: Fabrizio Ferazzoli
- League: Serie D/G
- 2012–13: Serie D/F, 2nd
Home colours	Away colours

Associazione Sportiva Dilettantistica San Cesareo is an Italian football club based in San Cesareo, Lazio. Currently it plays in Italy's Serie D.

== History ==
=== Foundation ===
The club was founded in 1967.

=== Serie D ===
In the season 2011–12 the team was promoted from Eccellenza Lazio/B to Serie D.

== Colors and badge ==
The team's colors are red and blue.

== Honours ==
- Eccellenza:
  - Winner (1): 2011–12
