= Montalto Uffugo =

- Comune
- Comune di Montalto Uffugo
- Coat of arms

- Location of Montalto Uffugo in Italy Montalto Uffugo (Calabria)
- Coordinates: 39°24′N 16°9′E
- Country: Italy
- Region: Calabria
- Province: Cosenza (CS)
- Frazioni: Caldopiano, Collina Salerni, Commicelle, Lucchetta, Montalto Uffugo Scalo, Parantoro, Pianette, San Nicola, Santa Maria la Castagna, Sant'Antonello, Settimo, Taverna, Vaccarizzo

Government
  - Mayor: Biagio Faragalli

Area
  - Total: 76.67 km^{2} (29.60 sq mi)
- Elevation: 500 m (1,600 ft)

Population (30 November 2017)
  - Total: 20,220
  - Density: 263.7/km^{2} (683.1/sq mi)
- Demonym: Montaltesi
- Time zone: UTC+1 (CET)
  - Summer (DST): UTC+2 (CEST)
- Postal code: 87046
- Dialing code: 0984
- Patron saint: Madonna della Serra
- Saint day: 12 February
- Website: Official website

Montalto Uffugo (Calabrian: Muntàvutu) is a city and comune of the province of Cosenza in the Calabria region of southern Italy. The original name of the town was Montalto. Uffugo was added to the town's name after the unification period in the 1860s. It was the childhood home of composer Ruggero Leoncavallo. His opera Pagliacci takes place in Montalto.

== Frazioni ==
=== Vaccarizzo ===
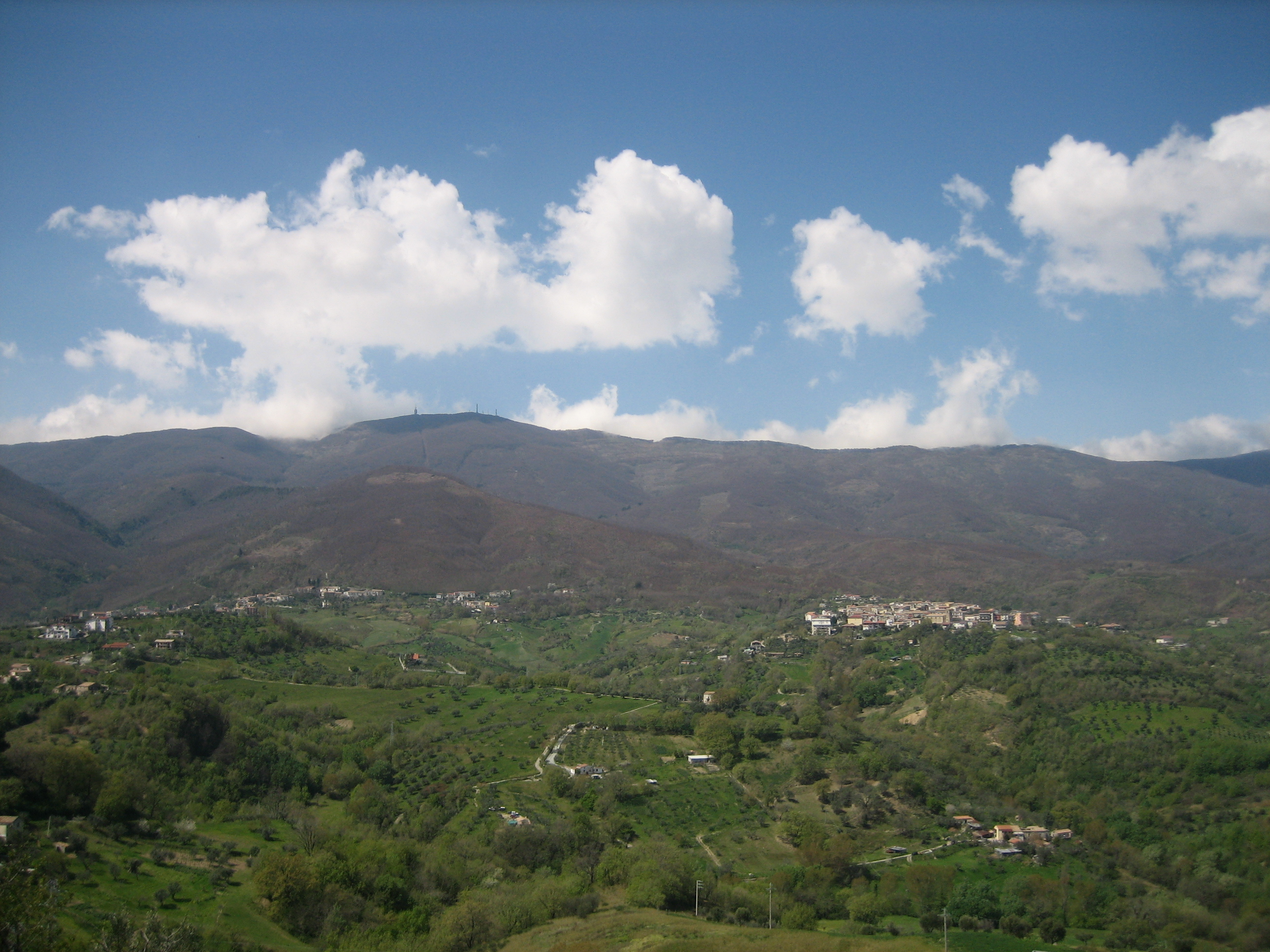
Vaccarizzo

Vaccarizzo is a hamlet of Montalto Uffugo, located a few kilometers away in west direction. It is possible to get there by taking the SP31 provincial road, immediately after passing through the hamlet of Parantoro. After leaving Vaccarizzo, the SP31 continues north towards the Arbereshe municipality of San Benedetto Ullano, with which it acts as a "limes" the Argentino river, called by the locals "arzintina". Vaccarizzo is situated at the foot of the Pauline coastal chain, which has the highest point on the Monte Cozzo Cervello summit, which reaches an altitude of 1389 m and it can be identified at a distance due to the large telecommunications antennas located on the ridge. On top of the summit there is also a statue of St. Francis of Paola that the faithful venerate every year on May 1 on a pilgrimage on foot to Paola. These mountains are part of the protected area "Natural Park of the Media Valle Crati Community".

The main square of Vaccarizzo is named after Giuseppe Garibaldi, the "Hero of the Two Worlds". In the upper part of the town, called "timbuni", there is a sports field and a statue of Padre Pio. The village has a primary school and a post office.

There are two churches. The first of the Visitation of Mary dates back to the 1600s. The population celebrates it on the third Sunday of September with a procession through the whole village, followed by a musical band, fireworks. The second is the San Rocco's church, erected by the Waldensians around the 13th century. It is celebrated on the first Sunday after the 15th of August. The population of Vaccarizzo is also very devoted to the "Madonna della Serra", patron saint of Montalto Uffugo. Legend has it that one day the statue of the Madonna della Serra was found rotated with respect to its original position and facing Vaccarizzo. Reported in its original position, the next day it was found once again turned towards Vaccarizzo, so that at the third time it was clear that it was a divine sign. The Madonna was thus left facing Vaccarizzo and the church entrance changed. The statue of the Madonna della Serra is carved in a single piece of oak wood and is represented seated in majesty on a throne holding the Child. The population of Vaccarizzo pays tribute to the Madonna della Serra with a pilgrimage on foot in February to thank her for the narrow escape of the earthquake of 1981.

The inhabitants of Vaccarizzo are called "vaccarizzari". The traditional games are the competition with ball bearing carts and the "pazzotta" competition, which consists in throwing a form of pecorino cheese triggered by a wounded wire, along the streets of the village, making it travel bold curves and hard trajectories.

Among the trades of the ancient craft tradition of Vaccarizzo is the wicker interleaver or master basket maker, called "u spurtunaru". That is to say the one who created baskets of different sizes and shapes from the interweaving of willow or chestnut branches or canes, called "panari", "spurtuni", "cannizzi", which were used for transporting vegetables and fruit. At Vaccarizzo silk processing and spinning was practiced, behind the church Visitazione di Maria Santissima, the remains of an ancient spinning mill, called "filanna", are visible. The breeding of silkworms, in the past, was entrusted to women who often allocated them in the chest for better protection

An ancient rite of the Vaccarizzo tradition is the slaughter of the pig. In an economy of subsistence, pig breeding was considered an indispensable element for the survival of the family. The killing of the pig took place in a very picturesque context, where everyone had a role, which from year to year remained fixed. There were those who "scannava" the animal, those who depilated their leather with boiling water, those who dissected it and separated their meat for the various finished products: soppressata, sausage, capicollo, ham, guanciale called "bujiio". Other rituals linked to the tradition were the tomato sauce, called "a cunserva", the harvest and relative production of wine, the olive harvest and relative production of oil at the local mill called "trappito", the collection of figs, chestnuts.

In March 2019, Vaccarizzo joined the list of "adopted" countries from MIT in Boston (USA), in order to counteract depopulation.

== Sports ==
S.S. Comprensorio Montalto Uffugo is an Italian association football club, based in this city.

== Notable people ==
- Blessed Elena Aiello
- Mario Tricoci
- Ruggero Leoncavallo
