= ASD Selargius Calcio =

Italian football club

Selargius
- Full name: Associazione Sportiva Dilettantistica Selargius Calcio
- Founded: 1965
- Ground: Stadio Generale Virgilio Porcu, Selargius, Italy
- Capacity: 1,200
- Chairman: Tonio Mura
- Manager: Karel Zeman
- League: Serie D/G
- 2012–13: Serie D/G, 16th
Home colours	Away colours

Associazione Sportiva Dilettantistica Selargius Calcio is an Italian association football club, based in Selargius, Sardinia. Selargius currently plays in Serie D.

== History ==
The club was founded in 1965.

At the end of the 1989–90 season it won a historic promotion to Serie D where it played for eleven consecutive seasons.

At the end of the 2000–01 season it was relegated to Eccellenza, where it stayed with mixed results until season 2008–09, when Selargius won the national play-off returning so to Serie D.

== Chronology ==
- 1965: Foundation of Selargius Calcio in Terza Categoria
- 1980–81: 7th in Promozione Girone A.
- 1981–82: 8th in Promozione Girone A.
- 1982–83: 2nd in Promozione Girone A.
- 1983–84: 11th in Promozione Girone A.
- 1984–85: 4th in Promozione Girone A.
- 1985–86: 10th in Promozione Girone A.
- 1986–87: 7th in Promozione Girone A.
- 1987: Merger with G.S. Orione.
- 1987–88: 10th in Promozione Girone A.
- 1988–89: 12th in Promozione Girone A.
- 1989–90: 1st in Promozione Girone A.
- 1990–91: 3rd in Serie D.
- 1991–92: 10th in Serie D
- 1992–93: 7th in Serie D.
- 1993–94: 9th in Serie D.
- 1994–95: 3rd in Serie D.
- 1995–96: 6th in Serie D.
- 1996–97: 11th in Serie D.
- 1997–98: 6th in Serie D.
- 1998–99: 11th in Serie D.
- 1999–00: 11th in Serie D.
- 2000–01: 17th in Girone G of Serie D. Relegated to Eccellenza Sardinia.
- 2001–02: 6th in Eccellenza Sardinia.
- 2002–03: 9th in Eccellenza Sardinia.
- 2003–04: 4th in Eccellenza Sardinia.
- 2004–05: 4th in Eccellenza Sardinia.
- 2005–06: 11th in Eccellenza Sardinia.
- 2006–07: 13th in Eccellenza Sardinia. Saved in play-out classified as best in the league, 1–1 outside and 3–3 at home against the Ilvamaddalena.
- 2007–08: 3rd in Eccellenza Sardinia. Won in regional play-off and eliminated in first turn in National play-off.
- 2008–09: 5th in Eccellenza Sardinia.. Won in national play-off (2–0 at home and 0–0 outside to Civitanovese). Promoted to Serie D
- 2009–10: 5th in Girone G of Serie D. Lost in the final of regional play-off (3–0 by Pomezia).
- 2010–11: 12th in Girone G of Serie D.
- 2011–12: 11th in Girone G of Serie D.

== Colors and badge ==
The team's colors are white and red.

== Stadium ==
The club plays its home matches in the Stadio Generale Virgilio Porcu with 1,200 seats located in the city.
