= ASD Cerea 1912 =

Italian football club

Cerea
- Full name: Associazione Sportiva Dilettantistica Cerea Calcio 1912
- Founded: 1912
- Ground: Stadio Pelaloca; Cerea, Italy
- Capacity: 2,000
- League: Eccellenza Veneto
- 2015–16: Eccellenza Veneto, 8th
Home colours	Away colours

Associazione Sportiva Dilettantistica Cerea Calcio 1912 or simply Cerea is an Italian association football club based in Cerea, Veneto. Cerea currently plays in Eccellenza Veneto.

== History ==
=== Foundation ===
The club was founded in 1912.

=== Serie D ===
In the season 2010–11 from Eccellenza Veneto Group A it was ranked 2nd and promoted for the first time to Serie D by repechage.

In the season 2011–12 in Serie D/D it was ranked 9th. Cerea was relegated in 2013.

== Colors and badge ==
The team's color are white and dark red.

== Stadium ==
It plays in Stadio Pelaloca in Cerea, which has a capacity of 2.000 seats.
