= ASD MapelloBonate Calcio =

Italian football club

MapelloBonate
- Full name: Associazione Sportiva Dilettantistica MapelloBonate Calcio
- Founded: 2011
- Ground: Stadio Comunale, Mapello, Italy
- Capacity: 1,000 chairman = Ivan Arrigoni
- Manager: Marco Bolis
- League: Serie D/B
- 2012–13: Serie D/B, 11th
Home colours	Away colours

Associazione Sportiva Dilettantistica MapelloBonate Calcio or simply MapelloBonate is an Italian association football club, based in Mapello and also representing Bonate Sopra, Lombardy. MapelloBonate currently plays in Serie D.

== History ==
The club was founded in 2011 after the merger of the club newly promoted to Serie D of Mapello and that of Bonate Sopra in Prima Categoria.

== Colors and badge ==
The team's color are white and yellow.
