= AC Castellana Calcio =

Italian football club

Castellana
- Full name: Associazione Calcistica Castellana Calcio
- Founded: 1973
- Ground: Stadio Comunale, Castel Goffredo, Italy
- Capacity: 1,500
- Chairman: Sergio Pezzini
- Manager: Marco Torresani
- League: Serie D/B
- 2012–13: Serie D/B, 7th
Home colours	Away colours

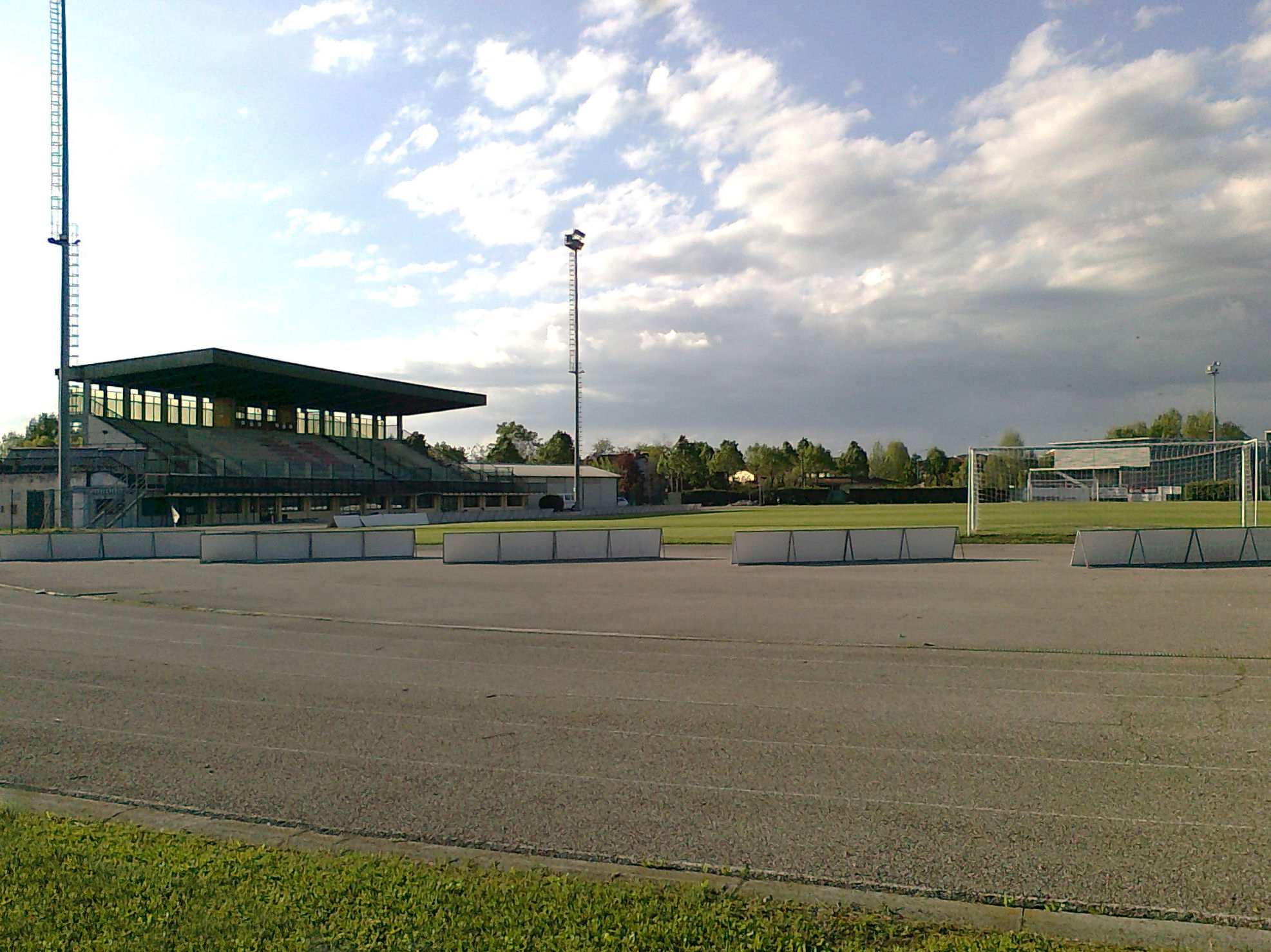
A view of the Castel Goffred stadium

Associazione Calcistica Castellana Calcio is an Italian association football club located in Castel Goffredo, Lombardy. It currently plays in Serie D.

== History ==
The club was founded in 1973.

In the season 2004–05 the club was promoted from Eccellenza Lombardy to Serie D.

== Colors and badge ==
Its colours are white and blue. The team away plays in the orange jersey with white shorts.

The symbol of Castellana consists of a shield with the company colours within which is placed the coat of arms of the local municipality.

== Stadium ==
The club plays its home matches at "Stadio Comunale" of Castel Goffredo, located in via Svezia. The plant, with a single grandstand, has 1500 seats. The budding fund measures 65 metres wide and 105 in length.
