= ASD Pierantonio Calcio 1965 =

Italian football club

Pierantonio
- Full name: Associazione Sportiva Dilettantistica Pierantonio Calcio 1965
- Founded: 1965
- Ground: Stadio Comunale "Morandi" , Umbertide, Italy
- Capacity: 3,500
- Chairman: Dante Cerbella
- Manager: Evelino Ceccarelli
- League: Serie D/E
- 2011–12: Serie D, 7th
Home colours	Away colours

Associazione Sportiva Dilettantistica Pierantonio Calcio 1965 or simply Pierantonio is an Italian association football club, based in Pierantonio, a frazione of Umbertide, Umbria.

Pierantonio currently plays in Serie D.

== History ==
The club was founded in 1965.

=== Serie D ===
In the 2010–11 season, it was promoted for the first time from Eccellenza Umbria to Serie D.

== Colors and badge ==
The team's colours are white and blue.
