= ASD Sanvitese =

Italian football club

Sanvitese
- Full name: Associazione Sportiva Dilettantistica Sanvitese
- Founded: 1920
- Ground: Stadio Comunale, San Vito al Tagliamento, Italy
- Capacity: 2,500
- Chairman: Paolo Gini
- Manager: Giovanni Esposito
- League: Serie D/C
- 2012–13: Serie D/C, 18th
Home colours	Away colours

Associazione Sportiva Dilettantistica Sanvitese is an Italian association football club located in San Vito al Tagliamento, Friuli-Venezia Giulia. It currently plays in Eccellenza.

== History ==
The club was founded in 1920.

In the 1993–94 season the club was promoted to Serie D where it currently plays for the 19th year consecutive.

== Colors and badge ==
The colors of the team are red and white.
