= ASC St Georgen =

Italian football club

St. Georgen
- Full name: Amateur Sport Club St. Georgen
- Nickname(s): Jergina
- Founded: 1968
- Ground: Stadio Comunale, Bruneck, Italy
- Capacity: 760
- Chairman: Georg Brugger
- Manager: Patrizio Morini
- League: Eccellenza Trentino-Alto Adige
- 2021-22: Eccellenza Trentino-Alto Adige, 2nd
Home colours	Away colours

Amateur Sport Club Sankt Georgen or simply St. Georgen is an Italian association football club, based in the fraction St. Georgen of Bruneck, South Tyrol. St. Georgen currently plays in Serie D.

== History ==
The club was founded in 1968.

In the season 2010–11 the team was promoted from Eccellenza Trentino-Alto Adige/Südtirol to Serie D.

On 2 May 2018 the club won the Coppa Italia Dilettanti (the first team from Südtirol to do that) and won promotion to Serie D.

== Colors and badge ==
The team's color are white and red.
