= SPD Amiternina Scoppito =

Italian football club

Amiternina Scoppito
- Full name: Società Polisportiva Dilettantistica Amiternina Scoppito
- Founded: 1972 (as Scoppito); 2013
- Ground: Comunale, Scoppito, Italy
- Capacity: 500
- Chairman: Renato Sebastiani
- Manager: Candido Di Felice
- League: Promozione Abruzzo
- 2020–21: Promozione Abruzzo 2020–21, 10th (as Amiternina Scoppito)
Home colours	Away colours

S.P.D. Amiternina Scoppito (usually referred to as simply Amiternina) is an Italian association football club, based in Scoppito, Abruzzo. It currently plays in Promozione and plays his home games in the Municipal Stadium of Scoppito.

== History ==
=== Foundation ===
In 1972, a group of local football fans founded a football team called Società Polisportiva Scoppito. The idea was an immediate success, as the team quickly garnered a large number of supporters. Within five years, the team advanced to the Prima Categoria, the second level of regional football.

In 1980, the club was renamed as Società Polisportiva Amiternum to reflect its goal of becoming a central representative of the ancient Amiternum. In 1988, the team achieved promotion for the first time in Promozione (first regional level) after winning the Prima Categoria. During this period, the club also established a thriving youth academy, led by Luciano Del Pinto and Egidio Iannini. The academy prioritized youth talent, a philosophy that yielded fruits in subsequent decades, producing players like Giuseppe Greco and Lorenzo Del Pinto who went on to play in Serie A.

The nineties began with the S.P. Scoppito who, in the name of a youth policy that has always distinguished her, manages to figure very well in the top regional championship (called Eccellenza after the reform), obtaining eight saves in the highest regional tournament. The 1997–1998 season saw the club relegated for the first time in its history. In 1999, to give continuity to the projects of the past, the club merged with near soccer team of Tornimparte: the name changed to Società Polisportiva Amiternina .

However, the corporate project is not supported by the results that see the newborn S.P.D. Amiternina relegate to the First Category and, then, fail to return to Promozione (became the second regional level) in the following season. Hence, in 2002, there was the split: local football fans of Tornimparte have recreated their own team in the Terza Categoria (the ninth level), while S.P.D. Amiternina disputes top championships in Promozione, managing to return to Eccellenza in the 2005–2006 season. However, we only have one season left before relegation.

=== The earthquake and the double promotion from the Promotion to Serie D ===
Following the 6 April 2009 earthquake, the Municipal Stadium of Scoppito was used as a tent city and made available to all the citizens of the town of Scoppito. Given the impossibility of continuing the sporting activity, the Federation gave the possibility to all the teams of the municipalities of the crater to preserve the category and, consequently, the company of the new president Maurizio Colantoni had the opportunity to re-register in the Promotion championship.

After a two-year exile in other structures in the area, in 2011 the new Municipal Stadium in synthetic grass was inaugurated, on which the team gets, under the guidance of coach Vincenzino Angelone, the double promotion from the Promotion to Serie D, always maintaining the value of promoting young people. In the first season in Serie D the team keeps the category without play-out, winning against famous clubs such as A.C. Ancona (2–3 at the Conero Stadium and 1–1 within friendly walls) and S.S. Sambenedettese Calcio (0–1).

=== S.P.D. Amiternina Scoppito ===
In summer 2013 S.P.D. Amitermina joins forces with the with S.P. Scoppito, another team from the same city that it plays in the lower categories: the name of club was changed to S.P.D. Amiternina Scoppito. This agreement also makes it possible to advertise the name of the country Scoppito in a national championship as Serie D, with a major radicalization on the territory.

In the season 2013–14 S.P.D. Amiternina Scoppito obtains permanence through the victory against Pro Sulmona Calcio 1921 (0–3) in the play-out: the permanence in the category, thanks to the reform of Serie C, will allow the Scoppitans to serve in the following season in the fourth national series in the next season. Also in the following season, S.P.D. Amiternina Scoppito goes to the play-out, winning against Castelfidardo: the club, also, wins the recognition of one of the youngest teams in Italy.

The next season the club, like the previous season, is characterized by a large number of young players: however, the results are not the best and the team struggles to get away from the relegation zone. S.P.D. Amiternina Scoppito finished the championship in last place and said goodbye to Serie D after four seasons.

The project with young players also continued in Eccellenza, where in 2019 raises the Coppa Italia Eccellenza Abruzzo to the sky: with this success the club has got in its palmares all the Eccellenza Abruzzo's and Promozione's trophies. However, the team – accomplice injuries and midweek of Coppa Italia Dilettanti – was relegated to the Promozione.

== Colors and badge ==
Before 1999, the colors were yellow and green. After the merger with local soccer team of Tornimparte, the green has been replaced by the red (typical color of his club).
