= AD Voluntas Calcio Spoleto =

Italian football club

Spoleto
- Full name: Associazione Sportiva Dilettantistica Spoleto Calcio
- Founded: 1932; 94 years ago as, Associazione Sportiva Fortis Spoleto Football Club; 1937; 89 years ago as, Spoleto Polisportiva Fascista; 1942; 84 years ago as, Virtus Spoleto Società Sportiva; 1963; 63 years ago as, Associazione Sportiva Spoleto (merged); 1980; 46 years ago as, Federazione Calcistica Spoleto (refounded); 1989; 37 years ago as, Polisportiva Nuova Spoleto (merged); 1993; 33 years ago as, Spoleto Calcio; 2003; 23 years ago as, Associazione Sportiva Fortis Spoleto Football Club (refounded); 2006; 20 years ago as, Associazione Dilettantistica Voluntas Calcio Spoleto (refounded); 2019; 7 years ago as, Società Sportiva Dilettantistica Spoleto Calcio; 2022; 4 years ago as, Associazione Sportiva Dilettantistica Spoleto Calcio (merged)
- Ground: Stadio Comunale di Spoleto, Spoleto, Italy
- Capacity: 1,500
- Chairman: Vittorio Montesi
- Manager: Emmanuele Loretoni
- League: Eccellenza Umbria
- 2015–16: Serie D/E, 18th (relegated)
Home colours	Away colours

Associazione Sportiva Dilettantistica Spoleto Calcio (or simply Spoleto) is an Italian association football club located in Spoleto, Umbria. It currently plays in Eccellenza Umbria.

== History ==
The club was refounded in 2006 after the bankruptcy of historic team of A.S. Fortis Spoleto F.C. in 1932, (Note: The team was renamed to Virtus Spoleto in 1942. In 1963, Virtus Spoleto and A.C. Spoleto merged to form Associazione Sportiva Spoleto. The team was reestablished in 1980 as Federazione Calcistica Spoleto. Afterwards, F.C. Spoleto and S.S. Nuova Virtus Spoleto merged to be Polisportiva Nuova Spoleto. It was renamed to Spoleto Calcio in 1993. Later on, it was reborn as Fortis Spoleto in 2003. It changed its name to Associazione Dilettantistica Voluntas Calcio Spoleto in 2006. In 2019, the name was changed to Società Sportiva Dilettantistica Spoleto Calcio.) just promoted to Serie C2 in the season 2005–06.

The team was promoted to Serie D in the 2009–10 season after an ascent started in Promozione Umbria in the 2006–07 season.

In July 2019, Saudi princess Noura bint Saad bin Abdulaziz Al Saud became the president of the club.

The team finished second in the Eccellenza Umbria 2019–20 season (it). In August 2020, the Saudi president decided to leave the club, and not to register them for the next season.

== Colors and badge ==
Its colors are white and red.
