= APD Tortona Villalvernia =

Italian football club

Tortona Villalvernia
- Full name: Associazione Polisportiva Dilettantistica Tortona Villalvernia
- Founded: 1983 (as Villavernia); 2009 (as Villavernia V.B.); 2012 (as Tortona Villavernia)
- Ground: Stadio Fausto Coppi, Tortona, Italy
- Capacity: 2,700
- Chairman: Fiorentino Merlano
- Manager: Renzo Semino
- League: Eccellenza Piedmont and Aosta Valley
- 2012–13: Serie D/A, 15h
Home colours	Away colours

Associazione Polisportiva Dilettantistica Tortona Villalvernia or simply Tortona Villalvernia is an Italian association football club, based in Tortona, Piedmont. Tortona Villalvernia currently plays in Eccellenza.

== History ==
The club was founded in 1983 as A.C. Villalvernia.

In the summer 2009 the club playing in Prima Categoria Piedmont and Aosta Valley was renamed Pol. Villalvernia Val Borbera after the acquisition of the sports title of Promozione club A.S.D. Val Borbera Calcio.

At the end of the 2010–11 Eccellenza season Villavernia V.B. was promoted from Eccellenza Piedmont and Aosta Valley to Serie D for the first time, after an ascent started in Promozione Piedmont and Aosta Valley in the 2009–10 season.

In the summer 2012 the club moved from Villalvernia to Tortona and was so renamed A.P.D. Tortona Villalvernia.

In the season 2012–13 the club was relegated to Eccellenza.

== Colors and badge ==
The team's colors are yellow and blue.

== Stadium ==
Home games are played at the Fausto Coppi stadium in Tortona.
