= ASD Mariano Keller =

Italian football club

Mariano Keller
- Full name: Associazione Sportiva Dilettantistica Mariano Keller
- Founded: 2004
- Dissolved: 2014
- Ground: Stadio Raffaele Paudice, San Giorgio a Cremano, Italy
- Capacity: 800
- Chairman: Salvatore Righi
- Manager: None
- League: regional youth leagues in Campania
Home colours	Away colours

A.S.D. Mariano Keller or simply Mariano Keller was an Italian association football club, based in Naples but currently playing San Giorgio a Cremano, Campania.

== History ==
=== Mariano Keller ===
The club was founded in 2004. At first the club was focused on youth team football only. Rolando Mandragora, a Fiorentina player, was a former player of Mariano Keller.

The team played in Serie D in the 2013–14 season after buying Serie D's club A.S.D. CTL Campania Piscinola sports title. They were however excluded after the end of the season due to administrative issues related mainly to club chairman Salvatore Righi's arrest for camorra related charges earlier in January 2014 which led to the club being seized by the magistrature.

=== The sport title of CTL Campania Piscinola ===
A.S.D. CTL Campania Piscinola was founded in 2007 after the merger of CTL Miracoli Soccer and Napoli Centrale Piscinola.

The team was promoted to Serie D in the 2010–11 season after an ascent started in Promozione Campania in the 2007–08 season.

It played at Stadio Dietro La Vigna in Piscinola with 300 places.

== Colors and badge ==
The team's color was blue.
