= SC Trestina ASD =

Italian football club

Trestina
- Full name: Sporting Club Trestina Associazione Sportiva Dilettantistica
- Nicknames: Bianconeri (the black and whites), Pinguini (the penguins)
- Founded: 1950
- Ground: Stadio Lorenzo Casini, Trestina, Città di Castello, Italy
- Capacity: 800
- Chairman: Leonardo Bambini
- Manager: Simone Marmorini
- League: Serie D/E
- 2021–22: Serie D/E, 7th
Home colours	Away colours	Third colours

Sporting Club Trestina Associazione Sportiva Dilettantistica or simply Trestina is an Italian association football club, based in Trestina, a frazione of Città di Castello Umbria.

Sporting Trestina currently plays in Serie D group E.

== History ==
The club was founded in 1966. In the season 2010–11 it was promoted, for the first time, from Eccellenza Umbria to Serie D.

== Colors and badge ==
The team's color are white and black.
