= ASD Todi =

Italian football club

Todi
- Full name: Associazione Sportiva Dilettantistica Todi Calcio
- Founded: 1952
- Ground: Stadio Franco Martelli; Todi, Italy
- Capacity: 1,200
- Chairman: Luca Rossini, Vittorio Spazzoni
- Manager: Fabrizio Ciucarelli
- League: Serie D/E
- 2011–12: Serie D/E, 11th
Home colours	Away colours

Associazione Sportiva Dilettantistica Todi Calcio is an Italian association football club, based in Todi, Umbria.

Todi currently plays in Serie D group E.

== History ==
The origins of football in Todi go back to 20 years, but the first teams to participate in a championship were Società Sportiva Marzia Todi and Associazione Sportiva Ulpio Traiano founded both in 1951. The two teams merged the next year, in 1952 becoming Società Sportiva Todi.

In the season 2009–10 from Eccellenza Umbria it was promoted to Serie D.

In the season 2010–11 in Serie D/E it was ranked 4th.

In the season 2011–12 in Serie D/E it was ranked 11th.

== Colors and badge ==
The team's colors are red and white.
