= ASD Lanciotto Campi Bisenzio =

Italian football club

Lanciotto Bisenzio
- Full name: Associazione Sportiva Dilettantistica Lanciotto Campi Bisenzio
- Founded: 2005
- Ground: Stadio Emil Zatopek, Campi Bisenzio, Italy
- Capacity: 2,000
- Chairman: Nello Bini
- Manager: Andrea Bellini
- League: Serie D/D
- 2011–12: Serie D/D, 8th
| Home colours | Away colours |

Associazione Sportiva Dilettantistica Lanciotto Campi Bisenzio or simply Lanciotto is an Italian association football club, based in Campi Bisenzio, Tuscany. It currently plays in Serie D.

== History ==
The club was founded on 23 June 2005 after the merger of A.C. Lanciotto (founded in 1944 and so named in memory of the local partisan Lanciottto Ballerini) and A.S. Campi Bisenzio (founded in 1969 as A.C. La Villa).

The team was promoted to Serie D in the 2010–11 season after an ascent started in Promozione in the 2009–10 season.

== Colors and badge ==
The team's color are red, yellow and blue.
