= ASD Cynthia 1920 =

Italian football club

Cynthia
- Full name: Associazione Sportiva Dilettantistica Cynthia 1920
- Founded: 1920
- Dissolved: 2020
- Ground: Stadio Comunale, Genzano di Roma, Italy
- Capacity: 6,000
Home colours	Away colours

Associazione Sportiva Dilettantistica Cynthia 1920 was an Italian association football club located in Genzano di Roma, Lazio.

== History ==
The club was founded in 1920.

=== Serie D ===
In the season 2006–07 it was promoted in Serie D for the first time.

In the season 2011–12 it was relegated to Eccellenza, but the club will continue to play in Serie D after being readmitted to fill the vacancies created.

In June 2020, Cynthia merged with neighbouring Albano Laziale-based club Albalonga to form Cynthialbalonga.

== Colors and badge ==
Its colors are white and blue.
