= Camaiore Calcio ASD =

Italian football club

Camaiore
- Full name: Camaiore Calcio Associazione Sportiva Dilettantistica
- Founded: 1955
- Ground: Stadio Comunale, Camaiore, Italy
- Capacity: 3,000
- League: Serie D
- Website: https://camaiorecalcio.akinda.com/
Home colours	Away colours

Camaiore Calcio Associazione Sportiva Dilettantistica is an Italian association football club located in Camaiore, Tuscany. It currently plays in the Serie D division.

== History ==
The club was founded in 1955 and initially participated in the Promozione Tuscany. In the mid-sixties the club relegated towards the lower level Prima Categoria, but they also played in Serie D for five consecutive seasons between 1970 and 1975.

After playing for over a decade in the Eccellenza-division, Camaiore in 1990 returned to Serie D (then named Campionato Interregionale), before relegating again in 2001.

In the 2009–10 season, Camaiore won the regional playoffs and promoted to Serie D again. At the end of the 2010–11 season they finished in 6th place, one point short from gaining the right to enter the playoffs.

Since the 2014–15 season Camaiore participates in the Eccellenza Tuscany again.

== Colors and badge ==
The club colors are red and blue.
