= AC Formigine ASD =

Italian football club

Formigine
- Full name: Società Sportiva Dilettantistica Real Formigine
- Founded: 1968; 58 years ago as, Associazione Calcio Formiginese; 2005; 21 years ago as, Associazione Calcio Formiginese Associazione Sportiva Dilettantistica; 2018; 8 years ago as, Rosselli Formigine S.S.D. a r.l. (merged); 2019; 7 years ago as, Società Sportiva Dilettantistica Real Formigine
- Ground: Stadio Pincelli, Formigine, Italy
- Capacity: 1,500
- Chairman: Fabrizio Castelli
- Manager: Andrea Barbi
- League: Promozione Emilia-Romagna
- 2014–15: Serie D/D, 20th (relegated)
Home colours	Away colours

Società Sportiva Dilettantistica Real Formigine is an Italian football club based in Formigine, Emilia Romagna. It currently plays in Promozione Emilia-Romagna.

== History ==
=== Foundation ===
The club was founded in 1968.

=== Serie D ===
In the season 2011–12 the team was promoted for the first time, from Eccellenza Emilia-Romagna/B to Serie D/D.

== Colours and badge ==
The team's colors are green and blue, derived from the town's coat.

== Honours ==
- Eccellenza Emilia-Romagna/B: 2011–12
