= ASD Santhià Calcio =

Italian football club

Santhià
- Full name: Associazione Sportiva Professionistica Santhià Calcio
- Founded: 1903
- Ground: Stadio Pairotto, Santhià, Italy
- Capacity: 2000
- League: Prima Categoria
Home colours	Away colours

Associazione Sportiva Dilettantistica Santhià Calcio Italian association football club, based in Santhià, Piedmont. The team reached its peak playing in Serie C and Serie D from 2011 to 2016

== History ==
The club was founded in 1903.

== Colors and badge ==
The team's color is dark-red.
