= Aurora Seriate Calcio =

Italian football club

Aurora Seriate
- Full name: Aurora Seriate Calcio
- Founded: 1967
- Dissolved: 2015 (merger)
- Ground: Stadio Comunale; Seriate, Italy
- Capacity: 1,600
- 2014–15: Serie D/B, 11th
Home colours	Away colours

Aurora Seriate Calcio or simply Aurora Seriate was an Italian association football club, based in Seriate, Lombardy. Aurora Seriate last played in Serie D.

== History ==
The club was founded in 1967 and developed in the next decade within the parish dispute for several years provincial championships.

In 2008, it won the championship of Prima Categoria and a historic promotion to Promozione. In the 2008–09 season in the Promozione, Aurora Seriate ended in fifth place but, due to winning the Italian Cup final category, the jump to 2009–10 Eccellenza was allowed.

In Eccellenza, the first year ended in second place, behind Rudianese and losing the final of the playoffs by the later promoted Sterilgarda Castiglione. In 2010–11 Eccellenza, it won the championship and the promotion to 2011–12 Serie D.

Aurora Seriate officially merged with fellow Lombardy and Serie D side FC AlzanoCene on 31 May 2015 to become Virtus Bergamo Alzano Seriate 1909.

== Colors and badge ==
The team's colors were red and blue.
