= ASDP Ribera 1954 =

Italian football club

Ribera
- Full name: Associazione Sportiva Dilettantistica Pro; Ribera 1954
- Founded: 1954
- Dissolved: 2013
- Ground: Stadio Nino Novara, Ribera, Italy
- Capacity: 2,500
- Chairman: Ezio Ruvolo
- 2012–13: Serie D/I, 11th
Home colours	Away colours

Associazione Sportiva Dilettantistica Pro Ribera 1954 was an Italian football club based in Ribera, Sicily.

== History ==
=== Foundation ===
The club was founded in 1954 as 'A.S. Ribera Calcio.

=== Serie D ===
In the season 2011–12 the team was promoted for the first time, from Eccellenza Sicily/A to Serie D.

In summer 2013 the club wasn't able to enter 2013–14 Serie D and was so subsequently liquidated.

== Colors and badge ==
The team's colors were white and light blue.

== Stadium ==
The game field Nino Novara seated a capacity of 2,500.

== Honours ==
- Eccellenza:
  - Winner (1): 2011–12
