= ASD Virtus Pavullese =

Italian football club

Virtus Pavullese
- Full name: Associazione Sportiva Dilettantistica Virtus Pavullese
- Founded: 1993
- Ground: Stadio Giuseppe Minelli, Pavullo nel Frignano, Italy
- Capacity: 2,500
- Chairman: Giuseppe Tazzioli
- Manager: Massimo Bagatti
- League: Serie D/D
- 2011–12: Serie D/D, 17th
Home colours	Away colours

Associazione Sportiva Dilettantistica Virtus Pavullese is an Italian association football club located in Pavullo nel Frignano, Emilia-Romagna. It currently plays in Serie D.

== History ==
The club was founded in 1993 after the merger between Unione Sportiva Pavullese Olimpia (historic city team founded in 1919) and Virtus Real Pavullese 91 (founded in 1991), either played in Promozione Emilia–Romagna.

== Colors and badge ==
The colors of the club are white and green.
