= SSD Virtus CiseranoBergamo 1909 =

Italian football club

Virtus CiseranoBergamo
- Full name: Società Sportiva Dilettantistica; Virtus CiseranoBergamo 1909 S.r.l.
- Founded: 2007 (as FC AlzanoCene); 2015 (merger with Aurora Seriate); 2019 (merger with Ciserano)
- Ground: Stadio Carillo Pesenti Pigna, Alzano Lombardo, Italy
- Capacity: 1,900
- Chairman: Ezio Morisini
- Manager: Andrea Bruniera
- League: Serie D
Home colours	Away colours

Virtus CiseranoBergamo 1909 is an Italian association football club from Ciserano, Lombardy. It was born in 2019 as a merger of Ciserano Calcio and Virtus Bergamo, itself a direct heir of Alzano Virescit, a club that also played Serie B in its history.

== History ==
=== Alzano Seriate ===
FC AlzanoCene officially merged with fellow Lombardy and Serie D side Aurora Seriate Calcio on 31 May 2015 to become Alzano Seriate 1909.

=== The football in Alzano before the merger ===
==== Foot-Ball Club Alzano ====
The origins of football in Alzano go back to 1909 when was founded Foot-Ball Club Alzano.

==== Alzano 1909 Virescit F.C. ====
In the summer 1993 was founded Alzano 1909 Virescit Football Club with the merger between Foot-Ball Club Alzano, from Alzano Lombardo, and Centro Giovanile Virescit Boccaleone, a club from Bergamo, which enjoyed some success in its Serie C1 period in the 1980s.

The new club started from Serie D in 1993 and obtained two consecutive promotions that brought it to play Serie C1. Alzano then won Serie C1/A in 1999, placing first ahead of Como. The Serie B experience for Alzano however lasted only one season, as the team relegated back to Serie C1 the next year. The club then relegated to Serie C2 in 2003 and was successively cancelled by the federation because of financial troubles.

==== A.S.D F.C. Alzano 1909 ====
The club was refounded in 2004 as A.S.D F.C. Alzano 1909, the side played for three seasons in Prima Categoria Lombardy.

==== AlzanoCene ====
The club was refounded in the summer 2007 with the merger between A.S.D. Football Club Alzano 1909 (playing in Prima Categoria Lombardy), from Alzano Lombardo and Ardens Cene (playing in Eccellenza Lombardy) from Cene. In the season 2007–08 it was promoted from Eccellenza Lombardy to Serie D.

=== The football in Cene before the merger ===
==== From U.S. Cene to Ardens Cene ====
The origins of football in Cene go back to 1947 when was founded U.S. Cene which in 1965 was refounded as Ardens Cene.

== Colors and badge ==
Its official colours are white and black. Its badge is similar to FC Barcelona.

== Honours ==
- Serie C1:
  - Winners (1): 1998–99
- Serie C2:
  - Winners (1): 1984–85
- Serie D:
  - Winners (1): 1983–84, 1994–95
- Coppa Italia Serie C:
  - Winners (1): 1985–86, 1997–98
