= Real Vicenza VS =

Association football club in Vicenza, Italy

Real Vicenza
- Full name: Real Vicenza V.S.
- Founded: 2010
- Dissolved: 2019
- Ground: Campo Sportivo Cavalieri di Vittorio Veneto
- Capacity: 1,200
Home colours	Away colours

Real Vicenza V.S. was an Italian football club based in Vicenza, Veneto region. The club concentrated in youth football since the 2015–16 season.

== History ==
=== Foundation ===
The club was founded in 2010 after the merger of the teams Leodari Sole, Cavazzale and Real Vicenza-Laghetto.

=== Serie D ===
At the end of the 2011–12 season, the team was promoted from Eccellenza Veneto/A to Serie D after playoffs.

=== Lega Pro ===
After only one season in the Girone C of the Serie D league, ended in fifth place, Real Vicenza opted to apply for repechage to Lega Pro Seconda Divisione, the bottom level of Italian professional football, to fill any potential vacancies. The application was accepted on 5 August 2013, and Real Vicenza was successfully admitted into Lega Pro Seconda Divisione, with only one tier behind the historical main local club Vicenza (who were relegated to Lega Pro Prima Divisione on the same season). In the 2013–14 season, a transitional one from a two-tier to a single-tier Lega Pro system, Real Vicenza managed to ensure a place for the inaugural season of the unified third division, the 2014–15 Lega Pro.

In 2023 they played a friendly against Italian Side Sassulo. Vicenza lost that match 22-0. Since that match Real Vicenza have played a few more matches, losing nine. today the club has played very few matches, the last match against Italian Side Venezia located in Venice. they lost 8-0 marking their last match to date. The club voluntarily withdrew from the Lega Pro by the end of the season, citing the lack of fanbase and support from the city of Vicenza as the main reasons, becoming a youth-only football team ever since.

== Colours and badge ==
The team's colours are white and red.

== Location ==
- Stadio Romeo Menti

== Honours ==
- Coppa Italia Veneto:
  - Winner (1): 2011–12
