= 2013–14 Serie D =

Annual soccer tournament

Serie D
- Season: 2013–14

The 2013–14 Serie D was the sixty-sixth edition of the top level Italian non-professional football championship. It represented the fifth tier in the Italian football league system.

It consisted of 161 teams, after the exclusion of Nardò and including the retired Ragusa and Bojano. It was divided into eight 18-team divisions and a 17-team division.

== Promotions ==
The nine division winners are automatically promoted to the new 2014–15 Serie C.

== Playoffs ==
Teams placed second through fifth in each division enter a playoff tournament, after the regular season, where the nine winners will compete among themselves with the best semifinalist and the finalist of Coppa Italia Serie D to determine three of the four semi-finalists. The fourth is the winner of Coppa Italia Serie D. The winner could receive a professional licence in event of bankruptcy of a Serie C club.

== Relegations ==
The two last-placed teams (17th and 18th) and the last (17th) in the Girone H, with the 16th if the 13th place is more of 8 points ahead of it and the 15th if the 14th place is more of 8 points ahead of this, are directly relegated. Otherwise the teams ranked 13th to 16th play a two-legged tie-breaker (13th vs 16th, and 14th vs 15th).

== Scudetto Serie D ==
The nine division winners enter a tournament to determine the over-all Serie D champion and is awarded the Scudetto Serie D.

== Events ==
=== Start of season ===
Given a normal season where there are no team failures and special promotions, Serie D would feature 9 teams that had been relegated from Seconda Divisione, 36 teams that had been promoted from Eccellenza, and 123 teams that had played in Serie D the year before.

Due to sixteen bankruptcies and exclusions, the 2013–14 season is to feature 5 teams that played in the 2012–13 Seconda Divisione season, 43 teams that played in the 2011–12 Eccellenza season and 115 teams that played in 2012–13 Serie D.

The league further admitted sixteen teams from Eccellenza to fill the vacancies created. These teams are:

- Mezzocorona, which finished 17th in Serie D 2012–13 Girone B
- Giorgione, which finished 17th in Serie D 2012–13 Girone C
- Pontevecchio, which finished 14th in Serie D 2012–13 Girone E
- R.C. Angolana, which finished 14th in Serie D 2012–13 Girone F
- Recanatese, which finished 16th in Serie D 2012–13 Girone F
- Budoni, which finished 13th in Serie D 2012–13 Girone G
- Anziolavinio, which finished 14th in Serie D 2012–13 Girone G
- Grottaglie, which finished 16th in Serie D 2012–13 Girone H
- Ripa La Fenadora, which finished 2nd in Eccellenza Veneto Girone B and was eliminated in the national play-off
- Triestina, which finished 2nd in Eccellenza Friuli-Venezia Giulia and was eliminated in the national play-off
- Correggese, which finished 2nd in Eccellenza Emilia-Romagna Girone A and was eliminated in the national play-off
- Sancolombano which finished 2nd in Eccellenza Lombardy Girone B and was eliminated in the national play-off
- Giulianova, which finished 2nd in Eccellenza Abruzzo and was eliminated in the national play-off
- Latte Dolce, which finished 2nd in Eccellenza Sardinia and was eliminated in the national play-off
- Rende, which finished 2nd in Eccellenza Calabria and was eliminated in the national play-off
- Due Torri, which finished 3rd in Eccellenza Sicily Girone B and was eliminated in the national play-off

== Standings ==
=== Girone A ===
==== Teams ====
Teams from Aosta Valley, Piedmont, Liguria and Lombardy

Club	City	Stadium	Capacity	2012–13 season
Albese	Alba	San Cassiano	2,000	1st in Eccellenza Piedmont and Aosta Valley Girone B
Asti	Asti	Censin Bosia	6,000	14th in Serie D Girone A
Borgosesia	Borgosesia	Comunale	2,500	5th in Serie D Girone A
Caronnese	Caronno Pertusella	Comunale	1,000	6th in Serie D Girone B
Chiavari Caperana	Chiavari	Angelo Daneri	2,300	7th in Serie D Girone A
Chieri	Chieri	Piero De Paoli	4,000	3rd in Serie D Girone A
Derthona	Tortona	Fausto Coppi	2,700	12th in Serie D Girone A
Folgore Caratese	Carate Brianza	XXV Aprile	3,000	6th in Serie D Girone A
Giana Erminio	Gorgonzola	Città di Gorgonzola	3,766	1st in Eccellenza Lombardy Girone B
Lavagnese	Lavagna	Edoardo Riboli	800	4th in Serie D Girone A
Novese	Novi Ligure	Costante Girardengo	3,500	16th in Serie D Girone A
Pro Dronero	Dronero	Filippo Drago	1,000	3rd in Eccellenza Piedmont and Aosta Valley Girone B
RapalloBogliasco	Rapallo and Bogliasco (playing in Rapallo)	Umberto Macera	250	10th in Serie D Girone A (as Bogliasco)
Santhià	Santhià	Fabio Pairotto	500	2nd in Serie D Girone A
Sestri Levante	Sestri Levante	Giuseppe Sivori	1,500	8th in Serie D Girone A
Vado	Vado Ligure	Ferruccio Chittolina	2,000	1st in Eccellenza Liguria
Vallée d’Aoste	Saint-Christophe (playing in Aosta)	Mario Puchoz	2,000	15th in Seconda Divisione Girone A
Verbania	Verbania	Carlo Pedroli	3,000	9th in Serie D Girone A

==== League table ====
Pos	Team	Pld	W	D	L	GF	GA	GD	Pts	Promotion or relegation
1	Giana Erminio (C, P)	34	21	10	3	66	28	+38	73	Promotion to 2014–15 Serie C
2	RapalloBogliasco	34	21	5	8	60	32	+28	68	Qualification for Promotion play-off
3	Borgosesia	34	20	7	7	74	36	+38	67	Qualification for Promotion play-off
4	Caronnese	34	18	8	8	52	29	+23	62	Qualification for Promotion play-off
5	Lavagnese	34	17	10	7	46	28	+18	61	Qualification for Promotion play-off
6	Chieri	34	19	3	12	53	44	+9	60	
7	Vado	34	14	9	11	55	46	+9	51	
8	Chiavari Caperana	34	11	13	10	35	30	+5	46	Not admitted next season (Note: Chiavari Caperana was excluded from competing next season.)
9	Asti	34	11	11	12	46	38	+8	44	
10	Novese	34	11	11	12	40	50	−10	44	
11	Vallée d’Aoste	34	10	12	12	41	42	−1	42	
12	Folgore Caratese	34	10	11	13	33	48	−15	41	
13	Derthona	34	10	9	15	37	44	−7	39	Qualification for Relegation play-off
14	Albese (R)	34	10	9	15	38	52	−14	39	Qualification for Relegation play-off
15	Sestri Levante	34	9	8	17	38	52	−14	35	Qualification for Relegation play-off
16	Pro Dronero (R)	34	7	9	18	51	75	−24	30	Qualification for Relegation play-off
17	Santhià (R)	34	4	10	20	26	69	−43	22	Relegation to Eccellenza
18	Verbania (R)	34	2	7	25	18	67	−49	13	Relegation to Eccellenza

Updated to match(es) played on 4 May 2014. Source: Datasport
Rules for classification: 1) points; 2) goal difference; 3) number of goals scored.
(C) Champions; (P) Promoted; (R) Relegated

=== Girone B ===
==== Teams ====
Teams from Emilia-Romagna, Lombardy and Veneto.

Club	City	Stadium	Capacity	2012–13 season
AlzanoCene	Alzano Lombardo and Cene (playing in Alzano Lombardo)	Carillo Pesenti Pigna	1,900	13th in Serie D Girone B
Aurora Seriate	Seriate	Luigi Innocenti	1,000	10th in Serie D Girone B
Borgomanero	Borgomanero	Comunale	2,000	1st in Eccellenza Piedmont and Aosta Valley Girone A
Caravaggio	Caravaggio	Comunale	2,180	8th in Serie D Girone B
Castellana	Castel Goffredo	Don Aldo Moretti	1,000	7th in Serie D Girone B
Darfo Boario	Darfo Boario Terme	Comunale	1,100	12th in Serie D Girone B
Gozzano	Gozzano	Comunale	4,000	11th in Serie D Girone A
Inveruno	Inveruno	Comunale		1st in Eccellenza Lombardy Girone A
Lecco	Lecco	Rigamonti-Ceppi	4,997	5th in Serie D Girone B
Legnago Salus	Legnago	Mario Sandrini	2,152	11th in Serie D Girone C
MapelloBonate	Mapello and Bonate Sopra (playing in Mapello)	Comunale	1,000	11th in Serie D Girone B
Olginatese	Olginate	Comunale	1,050	3rd in Serie D Girone B
Piacenza	Piacenza	Leonardo Garilli	21,668	1st in Eccellenza Emilia–Romagna Girone A
Pontisola	Ponte San Pietro, Terno d'Isola and Chignolo d'Isola (playing in Ponte San Pietro)	Matteo Legler	2,000	2nd in Serie D Girone B
Pro Piacenza	Piacenza	Gianni Siboni	800	4th in Serie D Girone D (as Atletico BP Pro Piacenza)
Pro Sesto	Sesto San Giovanni	Breda	4,500	16th in Serie D Girone B
Sambonifacese	San Bonifacio	Renzo Tizian	1,274	3rd in Serie D Girone C
Seregno	Seregno	Ferruccio	3,700	14th in Serie D Girone B

==== League table ====
Pos	Team	Pld	W	D	L	GF	GA	GD	Pts	Promotion or relegation
1	Pro Piacenza (C, P)	34	19	9	6	69	45	+24	66	Promotion to 2014–15 Serie C
2	Olginatese	34	14	15	5	43	25	+18	57	Qualification for Promotion play-off
3	Piacenza	34	16	9	9	59	46	+13	57	Qualification for Promotion play-off
4	Seregno	34	15	11	8	54	46	+8	56	Qualification for Promotion play-off
5	Inveruno	34	15	10	9	65	43	+22	55	Qualification for Promotion play-off
6	Pontisola	34	14	11	9	44	41	+3	53	Qualification for Promotion play-off
7	Pro Sesto	34	14	10	10	38	32	+6	52	
8	Caravaggio	34	12	14	8	54	40	+14	50	
9	Lecco	34	12	14	8	50	43	+7	50	
10	Aurora Seriate	34	12	10	12	35	39	−4	46	
11	Legnago Salus	34	12	6	16	44	50	−6	42	
12	Castellana	34	12	6	16	38	45	−7	42	
13	MapelloBonate	34	11	6	17	44	56	−12	39	Qualification for Relegation play-off
14	Borgomanero	34	9	9	16	43	56	−13	36	Qualification for Relegation play-off
15	AlzanoCene (R)	34	8	12	14	32	43	−11	36	Qualification for Relegation play-off
16	Gozzano (R)	34	8	10	16	35	41	−6	34	Qualification for Relegation play-off
17	Darfo Boario (R)	34	7	8	19	40	61	−21	29	Relegation to Eccellenza
18	Sambonifacese (R)	34	5	10	19	34	69	−35	25	Relegation to Eccellenza

Updated to match(es) played on 4 May 2014. Source: Datasport
Rules for classification: 1) points; 2) goal difference; 3) number of goals scored.
(C) Champions; (P) Promoted; (R) Relegated

=== Girone C ===
==== Teams ====
Teams from Friuli-Venezia Giulia, Trentino-Alto Adige/Südtirol and Veneto.

Club	City	Stadium	Capacity	2012–13 season
Belluno	Belluno	Polisportivo	2,585	10th in Serie D Girone C
Dro	Dro	Comunale		1st in Eccellenza Trentino-Alto Adige/Südtirol
Este	Este	Nuovo Comunale	1,200	13th in Serie D Girone C
Fersina Perginese	Pergine Valsugana	Comunale	2,000	15th in Serie D Girone B
Giorgione	Castelfranco Veneto	Comunale	2,100	17th in Serie D Girone C
Marano	Marano Vicentino	Pietro Berto	2,000	1st in Eccellenza Veneto Girone A
Mezzocorona	Mezzocorona	Comunale	1,500	17th in Serie D Girone B
Monfalcone	Monfalcone	Comunale	2,000	1st in Eccellenza Friuli-Venezia Giulia
Montebelluna	Montebelluna	San Vigilio	2,000	16th in Serie D Girone C
Pordenone	Pordenone	Ottavio Bottecchia	3,000	2nd in Serie D Girone C
Sacilese	Sacile	XXV Aprile – Aldo Castenetto	2,600	8th in Serie D Girone C
San Paolo Padova	Padua	Plebiscito	9,600	14th in Serie D Girone C
Sanvitese	San Vito al Tagliamento	Comunale	2,500	18th in Serie D Girone C
Tamai	Brugnera	Comunale	1,140	12th in Serie D Girone C
Triestina	Trieste	Nereo Rocco	28,565	2nd in Eccellenza Friuli-Venezia Giulia
Trissino-Valdagno	Trissino and Valdagno (playing in Valdagno)	Stadio dei Fiori	6,000	9th in Serie D Girone C
Union Ripa La Fenadora	Seren del Grappa	San Vigilio	2,000	2nd in Eccellenza Veneto Girone B
Vittorio Falmec	Vittorio Veneto	Paolo Barison	2,500	1st in Eccellenza Veneto Girone B

==== League table ====
Pos	Team	Pld	W	D	L	GF	GA	GD	Pts	Promotion or relegation
1	Pordenone (C, P)	34	27	4	3	77	20	+57	85	Promotion to 2014–15 Serie C
2	Marano	34	25	8	1	72	24	+48	83	Merged with Trissino-Valdagno (Note: Marano and Trissino-Valdagno merged in the summer of 2014 to become F.C.D. Altovicentino.)
3	Sacilese	34	19	9	6	55	28	+27	66	Qualification for Promotion play-off
4	Belluno	34	16	11	7	54	43	+11	59	Qualification for Promotion play-off
5	San Paolo Padova	34	13	11	10	45	51	−6	50	
6	Union Ripa La Fenadora	34	14	7	13	59	49	+10	49	
7	Este	34	13	9	12	53	43	+10	48	
8	Montebelluna	34	13	9	12	45	46	−1	48	
9	Trissino-Valdagno	34	10	13	11	47	49	−2	43	Merged with Marano
10	Triestina	34	11	9	14	48	45	+3	42	
11	Giorgione	34	9	12	13	36	35	+1	39	
12	Tamai	34	9	12	13	42	56	−14	39	
13	Vittorio Falmec (R)	34	11	5	18	42	59	−17	38	Qualification for Relegation play-off
14	Mezzocorona (R)	34	7	12	15	35	56	−21	33	Qualification for Relegation play-off
15	Monfalcone	34	7	13	14	37	52	−15	33 (Note: Monfalcone was docked 1 point.)	Qualification for Relegation play-off
16	Dro	34	7	10	17	34	66	−32	31	Qualification for Relegation play-off
17	Sanvitese (R)	34	8	6	20	37	55	−18	30	Relegation to Eccellenza
18	Fersina Perginese (R)	34	3	8	23	26	67	−41	17	Relegation to Eccellenza

Updated to match(es) played on 4 May 2014. Source: Datasport
Rules for classification: 1) points; 2) goal difference; 3) number of goals scored.
(C) Champions; (P) Promoted; (R) Relegated

=== Girone D ===
==== Teams ====
Teams from Emilia-Romagna, Lombardy, Tuscany and Veneto.

Club	City	Stadium	Capacity	2012–13 season
Atletico Montichiari	Montichiari	Romeo Menti	2,500	9th in Serie D Girone B
Camaiore	Camaiore	Comunale	3,000	12th in Serie D Girone D
Clodiense	Chioggia	Aldo e Dino Ballarin	3,622	6th in Serie D Girone C
Correggese	Correggio	Walter Bonelli	1,500	2nd in Eccellenza Emilia-Romagna Girone A
Fidenza	Fidenza	Dario Ballotta	2,400	9th in Serie D Girone D
Forcoli	Palaia	Guido Brunner	1,000	14th in Serie D Girone D
Formigine	Formigine	Pincelli	1,500	10th in Serie D Girone D
Fortis Juventus	Borgo San Lorenzo	Giacomo Romanelli	2,500	11th in Serie D Girone D
Imolese	Imola	Romeo Galli	4,000	2nd in Eccellenza Emilia-Romagna Girone B
Lucchese	Lucca	Porta Elisa	7,386	3rd in Serie D Girone D
Massese	Massa	degli Oliveti	11,500	2nd in Serie D Girone D
Mezzolara	Budrio	Pietro Zucchini	1,300	8th in Serie D Girone D
Palazzolo	Palazzolo sull'Oglio	Comunale	6,000	1st in Eccellenza Lombardy Girone C
Riccione	Riccione	Italo Niccoletti	7,000	13th in Serie D Girone D
Romagna Centro	Cesena	Centro sportivo	600	1st in Eccellenza Emilia-Romagna Girone B
Sancolombano	San Colombano al Lambro	Franco Riccardi	2,000	2nd in Eccellenza Lombardy Girone B
Thermal Abano Teolo	Abano Terme and Teolo (playing in Abano Terme)	delle Terme		3rd in Eccellenza Veneto Girone A
Virtus Castelfranco	Castelfranco Emilia	Fausto Ferrarini	1,280	6th in Serie D Girone D

==== League table ====
Pos	Team	Pld	W	D	L	GF	GA	GD	Pts	Promotion or relegation
1	Lucchese (C, P)	34	26	4	4	74	21	+53	82	Promotion to 2014–15 Serie C
2	Correggese (O)	34	25	6	3	88	22	+66	81	Qualification for Promotion play-off
3	Massese	34	21	4	9	62	25	+37	67	Qualification for Promotion play-off
4	Thermal Abano Teolo	34	21	4	9	64	34	+30	67	Qualification for Promotion play-off
5	Romagna Centro	34	21	3	10	71	33	+38	66	
6	Fortis Juventus	34	18	8	8	68	44	+24	62	
7	Mezzolara	34	17	6	11	65	57	+8	57	
8	Imolese	34	15	6	13	54	47	+7	51	
9	Clodiense	34	11	11	12	46	46	0	44	
10	Formigine	34	11	9	14	41	51	−10	42	
11	Virtus Castelfranco	34	10	11	13	46	49	−3	41	
12	Sancolombano	34	8	14	12	35	43	−8	38	
13	Fidenza	34	9	10	15	39	45	−6	37	
14	Camaiore (R)	34	6	11	17	36	48	−12	29	Relegation to Eccellenza
15	Atletico Montichiari	34	8	5	21	49	77	−28	28 (Note: Atletico Montichiari was docked 1 point.)	Qualification for Relegation play-off
16	Palazzolo (R)	34	2	16	16	33	60	−27	22	Relegation to Eccellenza
17	Forcoli (R)	34	4	9	21	20	64	−44	21	Relegation to Eccellenza
18	Riccione (R)	34	3	3	28	20	145	−125	2 (Note: Riccione was docked 10 points)	Club refounded, admitted to Terza Categoria (Note: Riccione was not admitted to Eccellenza after relegation. Club refounded in 2014 as ASD Unione Calcio Riccione.)

Updated to match(es) played on 4 May 2014. Source: Datasport
Rules for classification: 1) points; 2) goal difference; 3) number of goals scored.
(C) Champions; (O) Play-off winners; (P) Promoted; (R) Relegated

=== Girone E ===
==== Teams ====
Teams from Lazio, Tuscany and Umbria.

Club	City	Stadium	Capacity	2012–13 season
Arezzo	Arezzo	Città di Arezzo	13,128	9th in Serie D Girone E
Bastia	Bastia Umbra	Comunale	1,500	11th in Serie D Girone E
Deruta	Deruta	Comunale	600	6th in Serie D Girone E
FiesoleCaldine	Fiesole	Poggioloni	700	8th in Serie D Girone E
Flaminia Civita Castellana	Civita Castellana	Turrido Madani	1,300	15th in Serie D Girone E
Foligno	Foligno	Enzo Blasone	4,650	16th in Seconda Divisione B
Gualdo Casacastalda	Gualdo Tadino and Valfabbrica (playing in Gualdo Tadino)	Carlo Angelo Luzi	4,500	2nd in Serie D Girone E (as Casacastalda)
Jolly Montemurlo	Montemurlo	Aldo Nelli	1,300	1st in Eccellenza Tuscany Girone A
Narnese	Narni	San Girolamo	2,649	1st in Eccellenza Umbria
Olimpia Colligiana	Colle di Val d'Elsa	Gino Manni	3,000	1st in Eccellenza Tuscany Girone B
Ostia Mare	Ostia	Anco Marzio	1,000	5th in Serie D Girone G
Pianese	Piancastagnaio	Comunale	1,000	7th in Serie D Girone E
Pistoiese	Pistoia	Marcello Melani	13,195	5th in Serie D Girone D
Pontevecchio	Ponte San Giovanni	degli Ornari	1,000	14th in Serie D Girone E
Sansepolcro	Sansepolcro	Giovanni Buitoni	2,000	4th in Serie D Girone E
Scandicci	Scandicci	Turri	1,800	13th in Serie D Girone E
Trestina	Città di Castello	Lorenzo Casini	500	12th in Serie D Girone E
Voluntas Spoleto	Spoleto	Comunale	1,800	5th in Serie D Girone E

==== League table ====
Pos	Team	Pld	W	D	L	GF	GA	GD	Pts	Promotion or relegation
1	Pistoiese (C, P)	34	22	11	1	78	28	+50	77	Promotion to 2014–15 Serie C
2	Foligno	34	19	12	3	46	20	+26	69	Qualification for Promotion play-off
3	Arezzo (P)	34	17	13	4	57	27	+30	64	Promotion to 2014–15 Serie C (Note: Admitted to Lega Pro to fill vacancy.)
4	Pianese	34	17	12	5	60	38	+22	63	Qualification for Promotion play-off
5	Scandicci	34	18	8	8	51	42	+9	62	Qualification for Promotion play-off
6	Ostia Mare	34	14	10	10	53	41	+12	52	
7	Olimpia Colligiana	34	14	8	12	41	38	+3	50	
8	Sansepolcro	34	11	12	11	51	44	+7	45	
9	Gualdo Casacastalda	34	10	13	11	42	44	−2	43	
10	Flaminia Civita Castellana	34	10	12	12	40	43	−3	42	
11	Trestina	34	10	12	12	40	44	−4	42	
12	Voluntas Spoleto	34	12	5	17	46	48	−2	41	
13	Jolly Montemurlo	34	8	16	10	38	36	+2	40	
14	Bastia	34	10	9	15	38	58	−20	39	Qualification for Relegation play-off
15	Deruta (R)	34	8	7	19	38	60	−22	31	Qualification for Relegation play-off
16	FiesoleCaldine (R)	34	8	4	22	32	65	−33	28	Not admitted to Eccellenza
17	Narnese (R)	34	4	9	21	28	62	−34	21	Relegation to Eccellenza
18	Pontevecchio (R)	34	5	5	24	42	83	−41	20	Relegation to Eccellenza

Updated to match(es) played on 4 May 2014. Source: Datasport
Rules for classification: 1) points; 2) goal difference; 3) number of goals scored.
(C) Champions; (P) Promoted; (R) Relegated

=== Girone F ===
==== Teams ====
Teams from Abruzzo, Marche and Molise.

Club	City	Stadium	Capacity	2012–13 season
Amiternina	Scoppito	Comunale	500	13th in Serie D Girone F
Ancona	Ancona	Conero	23,983	7th in Serie D Girone F
Bojano	Bojano	Adriano Colalillo	3,368	1st in Eccellenza Molise
Celano	Celano	Fabio Piccone	3,200	15th in Serie D Girone F
Civitanovese	Civitanova Marche	Polisportivo Comunale	6,000	10th in Serie D Girone F
Fano	Fano	Raffaele Mancini	8,800	16th in Seconda Divisione A
Fermana	Fermo	Bruno Recchioni	9,500	1st in Eccellenza Marche (as Montegranaro)
Giulianova	Giulianova	Rubens Fadini	4,347	2nd in Eccellenza Abruzzo
Isernia	Isernia	Mario Lancellotta	5,000	13th in Serie D Girone F
Jesina	Jesi	Pacifico Carotti	5,000	9th in Serie D Girone F
Maceratese	Macerata	Helvia Recina	5,850	4th in Serie D Girone F
Matelica	Matelica	Comunale	500	1st in Eccellenza Marche
Olympia Agnonese	Agnone	Civitelle	5,000	6th in Serie D Girone F
Recanatese	Recanati	Nicola Tubaldi	2,000	16th in Serie D Girone F
R.C. Angolana	Città Sant'Angelo	Leonardo Petruzzi	2,020	14th in Serie D Girone F
Sulmona	Sulmona	Francesco Pallozzi	1,800	1st in Eccellenza Abruzzo
Termoli	Termoli	Gino Cannarsa	3,300	2nd in Serie D Girone F
Vis Pesaro	Pesaro	Tonino Benelli	4,800	5th in Serie D Girone F

==== League table ====
Pos	Team	Pld	W	D	L	GF	GA	GD	Pts	Promotion or relegation
1	Ancona (C, P)	34	23	9	2	69	18	+51	77 (Note: Ancona was docked 1 point.)	Promotion to 2014–15 Serie C
2	Matelica	34	19	11	4	64	29	+35	68	Qualification for Promotion play-off
3	Termoli	34	19	10	5	66	28	+38	67	Qualification for Promotion play-off
4	Maceratese	34	18	10	6	61	34	+27	64	Qualification for Promotion play-off
5	Recanatese	34	12	13	9	53	39	+14	49	
6	Vis Pesaro	34	12	13	9	53	38	+15	49	
7	Celano	34	9	19	6	46	26	+20	46	
8	Jesina	34	13	7	14	51	48	+3	46	
9	Fermana	34	11	12	11	48	40	+8	45	
10	Civitanovese	34	11	11	12	36	32	+4	44	
11	Fano	34	11	11	12	37	31	+6	44	
12	Giulianova	34	12	8	14	45	41	+4	44	
13	Olympia Agnonese	34	12	7	15	41	47	−6	42 (Note: Olympia Agnonese was docked 1 point.)	
14	Sulmona (R)	34	11	7	16	40	53	−13	40	Qualification for Relegation play-off
15	Amiternina	34	8	16	10	38	40	−2	40	Qualification for Relegation play-off
16	R.C. Angolana (R)	34	5	11	18	34	53	−19	26	Relegation to Eccellenza
17	Isernia (R)	34	6	10	18	29	57	−28	25 (Note: Isernia was docked 1 point.)	Relegation to Eccellenza
18	Bojano (R)	34	1	1	32	9	164	−155	0 (Note: Bojano was docked 1 point and later an additional 3 points.)	Club refounded, joined Prima Categoria (Note: On 6 April 2014, Bojano was excluded from the championship after renouncing to play its remaining 4 games, which were forfeited 0–3 in favor of their opponents. Club later refounded as SCD Bojano 62.)

Updated to match(es) played on 4 May 2014. Source: Datasport
Rules for classification: 1) points; 2) goal difference; 3) number of goals scored.
(C) Champions; (P) Promoted; (R) Relegated

=== Girone G ===
==== Teams ====
Teams from Lazio and Sardinia.

Club	City	Stadium	Capacity	2012–13 season
Anziolavinio	Anzio	Massimo Bruschini	3,000	14th in Serie D Girone G
Arzachena	Arzachena	Biagio Pirina	3,100	10th in Serie D Girone G
Astrea	Rome	Casal del Marmo	2,500	8th in Serie D Girone F
Budoni	Budoni	Comunale	1,500	13th in Serie D Girone G
Cynthia	Genzano di Roma	Comunale	3,500	9th in Serie D Girone G
Fondi	Fondi	Domenico Purificato	2,900	18th in Seconda Divisione B
Isola Liri	Isola del Liri	Conte Arduino Mangoni	3,008	11th in Serie D Girone G
Latte Dolce	Sassari	Comunale	1,500	2nd in Eccellenza Sardinia
Lupa Roma	Rome	Pietro Desideri (playing in Fiumicino)	682	6th in Serie D Girone G (as Lupa Frascati)
Maccarese Giada	Rome	Emilio Darra	570	1st in Eccellenza Lazio Girone B (as Monterotondo Lupa)
Olbia	Olbia	Bruno Nespoli	8,000	1st in Eccellenza Sardinia
Palestrina	Palestrina (playing in Rome)	Francesca Gianni	2,500	7th in Serie D Girone G (as San Basilio Palestrina)
Porto Torres	Porto Torres	Comunale	2,000	12th in Serie D Girone G
San Cesareo	San Cesareo	Comunale	2,000	2nd in Serie D Girone F
Santa Maria Mole Marino	Marino	Domenico Fiore	3,000	1st in Eccellenza Lazio Girone A
Selargius	Selargius	Generale Virgilio Porcu	1,200	16th in Serie D Girone G
Sora	Sora	Claudio Tomei	7,500	8th in Serie D Girone G
Terracina	Terracina	Mario Colavolpe	4,000	2nd in Eccellenza Lazio Girone B

==== League table ====
Pos	Team	Pld	W	D	L	GF	GA	GD	Pts	Promotion or relegation
1	Lupa Roma (C, P)	34	22	4	8	71	36	+35	70	Promotion to 2014–15 Serie C
2	Terracina	34	19	10	5	73	33	+40	67	Qualification for Promotion play-off
3	San Cesareo	34	19	9	6	76	37	+39	66	Qualification for Promotion play-off
4	Olbia	34	17	7	10	59	46	+13	58	Qualification for Promotion play-off
5	Cynthia	34	15	8	11	57	42	+15	52 (Note: Cynthia was docked 1 point.)	
6	Fondi	34	14	9	11	47	30	+17	51	
7	Anziolavinio	34	12	11	11	41	41	0	47	
8	Astrea	34	12	11	11	45	38	+7	47	
9	Maccarese Giada	34	13	8	13	50	50	0	47	Not admitted next season
10	Palestrina	34	12	10	12	53	47	+6	46	
11	Isola Liri	34	10	15	9	41	45	−4	45	
12	Sora	34	14	6	14	42	36	+6	45 (Note: Sora was docked 3 points.)	
13	Budoni	34	12	7	15	48	46	+2	43	Qualification for Relegation play-off
14	Latte Dolce (R)	34	11	10	13	34	40	−6	43	Qualification for Relegation play-off
15	Selargius	34	8	11	15	54	75	−21	35	Qualification for Relegation play-off
16	Arzachena	34	9	8	17	36	56	−20	35	Readmitted next season (Note: Originally relegated but subsequently readmitted to fill vacancy.)
17	Santa Maria Mole Marino (R)	34	8	8	18	50	63	−13	32	Relegation to Eccellenza
18	Porto Torres (R)	34	1	4	29	20	137	−117	7	Relegation to Eccellenza

Updated to match(es) played on 4 May 2014. Source: Datasport
Rules for classification: 1) points; 2) goal difference; 3) number of goals scored.
(C) Champions; (P) Promoted; (R) Relegated

=== Girone H ===
==== Teams ====
Teams from Apulia, Basilicata and Campania.

Club	City	Stadium	Capacity	2012–13 season
Bisceglie	Bisceglie	Gustavo Ventura	5,000	6th in Serie D Girone H
Brindisi	Brindisi	Franco Fanuzzi	7,600	8th in Serie D Girone H
Francavilla	Francavilla in Sinni	Nunzio Fittipaldi	1,200	10th in Serie D Girone H
Gelbison Cilento	Vallo della Lucania	Giovanni Morra	4,000	4th in Serie D Girone I
Gladiator	Santa Maria Capua Vetere	Mario Piccirillo	2,000	2nd in Serie D Girone H
Grottaglie	Grottaglie	Atlantico D'Amuri	1,800	16th in Serie D Girone H
Manfredonia	Manfredonia	Miramare	4,076	3rd in Eccellenza Apulia
Mariano Keller	Naples (playing in San Giorgio a Cremano)	Raffaele Paudice	800	9th in Serie D Girone H (as Campania)
Matera	Matera	XXI Settembre-Franco Salerno	6,879	3rd in Serie D Girone H
MonosPolis	Monopoli	Vito Simone Veneziani	8,000	4th in Serie D Girone H
Progreditur Marcianise	Marcianise	Progreditur	4,550	1st in Eccellenza Campania Girone A
Puteolana Internapoli	Pozzuoli	Domenico Conte	7,000	13th in Serie D Girone H
Real Metapontino	Montalbano Jonico	Puccio Dellorusso	2,000	1st in Eccellenza Basilicata
Real Vico Equense	Vico Equense	Comunale	1,500	15th in Serie D Girone G (as Real Hyria Nola)
San Severo	San Severo	Ricciardelli	300	1st in Eccellenza Apulia
Taranto	Taranto	Erasmo Iacovone	27,584	7th in Serie D Girone H
Turris Neapolis	Torre del Greco	Amerigo Liguori	5,300	2nd in Serie D Girone G (as Torre Neapolis)

==== League table ====
Pos	Team	Pld	W	D	L	GF	GA	GD	Pts	Promotion or relegation
1	Matera (C, P)	32	19	7	6	48	22	+26	64	Promotion to 2014–15 Serie C
2	Taranto	32	18	8	6	56	37	+19	62	Qualification for Promotion play-off
3	Turris Neapolis (Note: Turris Neapolis moved to Mugnano di Napoli and renamed F.C. Neapolis.)	32	16	10	6	45	26	+19	58	Qualification for Promotion play-off
4	MonosPolis	32	17	6	9	48	32	+16	57	Qualification for Promotion play-off
5	Progreditur Marcianise	32	16	8	8	60	34	+26	56	Qualification for Promotion play-off
6	Brindisi	32	15	9	8	51	35	+16	53 (Note: Brindisi and Puteolana Internapoli were docked 1 point, while Gladiator was docked 2 points.)	
7	Francavilla	32	14	8	10	49	40	+9	50	
8	Bisceglie	32	11	11	10	46	39	+7	44	
9	Gelbison Cilento	32	11	9	12	36	42	−6	42	
10	Manfredonia	32	10	8	14	36	48	−12	38	
11	Mariano Keller	32	10	7	15	39	54	−15	37	Not admitted next season
12	San Severo	32	10	7	15	31	47	−16	37	
13	Real Vico Equense (R)	32	7	12	13	28	41	−13	33	Qualification for Relegation play-off
14	Puteolana Internapoli	32	5	15	12	26	35	−9	29	Qualification for Relegation play-off
15	Real Metapontino (R)	32	7	8	17	29	41	−12	29	Qualification for Relegation play-off
16	Grottaglie	32	7	5	20	30	54	−24	26	Qualification for Relegation play-off
17	Gladiator (R)	32	7	6	19	22	53	−31	25	Relegation to Eccellenza (Note: On 6 November 2013, Nardò was excluded from the championship after renouncing to play four games in Serie D. All the games played by the club were annulled. The club was later refounded as ACD Nardò in 2014 and admitted to Eccellenza Puglia.)

Updated to match(es) played on 4 May 2014. Source: Datasport
Rules for classification: 1) points; 2) goal difference; 3) number of goals scored.
(C) Champions; (P) Promoted; (R) Relegated

=== Girone I ===
==== Teams ====
Teams from Calabria, Campania and Sicily.

Club	City	Stadium	Capacity	2012–13 season
Agropoli	Agropoli	Raffaele Guariglia	5,000	13th in Serie D Girone I
Akragas	Agrigento	Esseneto	8,500	1st in Eccellenza Sicily Girone A
Battipagliese	Battipaglia	Luigi Pastena	7,000	11th in Serie D Girone H
Cavese	Cava de' Tirreni	Simonetta Lamberti	5,200	8th in Serie D Girone I (as Pro Cavese)
Città di Messina	Messina	Giovanni Celeste	11,900	3rd in Serie D Girone I
Due Torri	Piraino	Enzo Vasi	3,800	3rd in Eccellenza Sicily Girone B
HinterReggio	Reggio Calabria	Oreste Granillo	27,543	14th in Seconda Divisione B
Licata	Licata	Dino Liotta	11,000	10th in Serie D Girone I
Montalto Uffugo	Montalto Uffugo (playing in Paola)	Comunale	2,500	12th in Serie D Girone I
Nuova Gioiese	Gioia Tauro	Polivalente	7,000	1st in Eccellenza Calabria
Noto	Noto	Polisportivo Palatucci	3,000	9th in Serie D Girone I
Orlandina	Capo d'Orlando	Ciccino Micale	5,000	1st in Eccellenza Sicily Girone B
Pomigliano	Pomigliano d'Arco	Ugo Gobbato	1,600	12th in Serie D Girone H
Ragusa^{3}	Ragusa	Aldo Campo	4,500	15th in Serie D Girone I
Rende	Rende	Marco Lorenzon	5,000	2nd in Eccellenza Calabria
Savoia	Torre Annunziata	Alfredo Giraud	10,750	7th in Serie D Girone I
Torrecuso	Torrecuso	G. Ocone	1,500	2nd in Eccellenza Campania Girone B
Vibonese	Vibo Valentia	Luigi Razza	6,000	5th in Serie D Girone I

==== League table ====
Pos	Team	Pld	W	D	L	GF	GA	GD	Pts	Promotion or relegation
1	Savoia (C, P)	34	25	7	2	86	28	+58	82	Promotion to 2014–15 Serie C
2	Akragas	34	22	6	6	69	24	+45	72	Qualification for Promotion play-off
3	Agropoli	34	18	9	7	64	34	+30	63	Qualification for Promotion play-off
4	Battipagliese	34	17	7	10	59	46	+13	57 (Note: Battipagliese, HinterReggio and Montalto Uffugo were docked 1 point, while Cavese was docked 4 points.)	Qualification for Promotion play-off
5	Torrecuso	34	13	13	8	45	38	+7	52	
6	Nuova Gioiese	34	12	14	8	40	28	+12	50	
7	Cavese	34	14	11	9	84	54	+30	49	
8	HinterReggio	34	11	13	10	33	31	+2	45	
9	Noto	34	10	15	9	48	50	−2	45	
10	Orlandina	34	11	10	13	51	62	−11	43	
11	Pomigliano	34	11	10	13	39	44	−5	43	Qualification for Promotion play-off (Note: Qualified as winner of 2013–14 Coppa Italia Serie D.)
12	Montalto Uffugo	34	9	16	9	41	39	+2	42	
13	Rende	34	11	9	14	30	41	−11	42	
14	Città di Messina (R)	34	7	13	14	39	52	−13	34	Qualification for Relegation play-off
15	Due Torri	34	6	16	12	36	43	−7	34	Qualification for Relegation play-off
16	Vibonese (R)	34	7	11	16	29	48	−19	32	Relegation to Eccellenza
17	Licata (R)	34	4	11	19	32	86	−54	20 (Note: Licata was docked 3 points.)	Relegation to Eccellenza
18	Ragusa (R)	34	1	3	30	13	90	−77	2 (Note: Ragusa was docked 4 points.)	Club refounded, admitted to Promozione (Note: On 29 January 2014, Ragusa was excluded from the championship after renouncing to play 4 games. All their remaining matches were forfeited in favor of their opponents, 0–3. The club was later refounded as USD Ragusa.)

Updated to match(es) played on 4 May 2014. Source: Datasport
Rules for classification: 1) points; 2) goal difference; 3) number of goals scored.
(C) Champions; (P) Promoted; (R) Relegated

== Scudetto Dilettanti ==
=== First round ===
- division winners placed into 3 groups of 3
- group winners and best second-placed team qualify for semi-finals

==== Group 1 ====
Team	Pld	W	D	L	GF	GA	GD	Pts
Pro Piacenza	2	1	1	0	5	4	+1	4
Pordenone	2	1	1	0	6	5	+1	4
Giana Erminio	2	0	0	2	3	5	−2	0

Pro Piacenza (B)	3–2	(A) Giana Erminio	played on 11 May 2014
Giana Erminio (A)	1–2	(C) Pordenone	played on 18 May 2014
Pordenone (C)	3–3	(B) Pro Piacenza	played on 24 May 2014

==== Group 2 ====
Team	Pld	W	D	L	GF	GA	GD	Pts
Lucchese	2	1	1	0	2	1	+1	4
Ancona 1905	2	1	0	1	3	3	0	3
Pistoiese	2	0	1	1	1	2	−1	1

Pistoiese (E)	0–0	(D) Lucchese	played on 11 May 2014
Ancona (F)	2–1	Pistoiese (E)	played on 18 May 2014
Lucchese (D)	2–1	(F) Ancona	played on 25 May 2014

==== Group 3 ====
Team	Pld	W	D	L	GF	GA	GD	Pts
Lupa Roma	2	1	1	0	2	1	+1	4
Matera	2	0	2	0	1	1	0	2
Savoia	2	0	1	1	1	2	−1	1

Savoia (I)	0–0	(H) Matera	played on 11 May 2014
Lupa Roma (G)	2–1	(I) Savoia	played on 18 May 2014
Matera (H)	1–1	(G) Lupa Roma	played on 25 May 2014

=== Semi-finals ===
Each game was played in one leg on 29 May 2014 on neutral grounds. They were extended to penalty kicks without playing extra time.

Pordenone (C)	0–0 (4–1 pen.)	(D) Lucchese	Arezzo
Pro Piacenza (B)	1–1 (3–4 pen.)	(G) Lupa Roma	Città di Castello

=== Final ===
One leg final was played on 31 May 2014 on neutral ground.

Pordenone (C)	1–0	(G) Lupa Roma	Arezzo

Scudetto Winner: Pordenone

== Promotion play-off ==
Promotion playoffs involved a total of 33 teams; four from Serie D divisions A-B-H (teams placed from 2nd through to 5th) and three from divisions C-G and I (teams placed 2nd to 4th), with the best semifinalist, the finalist and the winner of Coppa Italia Serie D that are directly respectively admitted to the third, fourth round and the Semi-final.

=== Rules ===
==== First and second round ====
- The first two rounds were one-legged matches played in the home field of the best-placed team.
- The games ending in ties were extended to extra time. The higher classified team was declared the winner if the game was still tied after extra time. Penalty kicks were not taken.
- Round one matched 2nd & 5th-placed teams and 3rd & 4th-placed teams within each division (A, B, H only); 2nd-placed teams got a bye to the second round, awaiting winner of 2nd team-4th team matches (for divisions C, D, F, G, I; 3rd team-5th team match for division E).
- The two winners from each division played each other in the second round.

==== Third and fourth round ====
- The nine winners – one each from the nine Serie D divisions – were qualified with division E 3rd-placer Arezzo, as the best ranked semifinalist of Coppa Italia Serie D to the third round, that was played in one-legged match in the home field of the best-placed team.
- The five winners were qualified with division B 6th-placer Pontisola, as finalist of Coppa Italia Serie D to the fourth round, that was played in one-legged match in the home field of the best-placed team.
- The games ending in ties were extended to penalty kicks without playing extra time.

==== Semifinals and final ====
- The three 4th-round winners were qualified for the semifinal round, joining division I 11th-placer Pomigliano, as Coppa Italia Serie D winner.
- The semifinals and the final, with the respective winners, were in a one-legged hosted in a neutral ground.
- The games ending in ties were extended to penalty kicks without playing extra time.

==== Repechages ====
- The tournament results provide a list, starting with the winner, by which vacancies could be filled in Serie C.
- If the winner is not admitted to this league it gets €30,000, while the replacement (the finalist) instead gets €15,000.

=== First round ===
- Borgosesia-Caronnese match played on 10 May 2014; all others played on 11 May 2014
- Single-legged matches played at best-placed club's home field: 2nd-placed team plays home 5th-placed team, 3rd-placed team plays home 4th placed team (divisions A-B-H only)
- Games ending in a tie are extended to extra time; if still tied, the higher-classified team wins

Team 1	Score	Team 2
RapalloBogliasco (A2)	1-3	(A5) Lavagnese
Borgosesia (A3)	4-4 (aet)	(A4) Caronnese
Olginatese (B2)	1-1 (aet)	(B5) Inveruno
Piacenza (B3)	1-3	(B4) Seregno
Sacilese (C3)	1-0	(C4) Belluno
Thermal Abano Teolo (D3)	2-4 (aet)	(D4) Massese
Pianese (E3)	3-2	(E5) Scandicci
Termoli (F3)	2-1	(F4) Maceratese
San Cesareo (G3)	3-1	(G4) Olbia
Taranto (H2)	3-2	(H5) Progreditur Marcianise
Turris Neapolis (H3)	0-5	(H4) MonosPolis
Agropoli (I3)	2-0	(I4) Battipagliese

=== Second round ===
- Played on 14 May 2014
- Single-legged matches played at best-placed club's home field
- Games ending in a tie are extended to extra time; if still tied, the higher-classified team wins

Team 1	Score	Team 2
Borgosesia (A4)	3-2	(A5) Lavagnese
Olginatese (B2)	1-0	(B4) Seregno
Marano (C2)	1-3	(C3) Sacilese
Correggese (D2)	4-0	(D4) Massese
Foligno (E2)	2-0	(E3) Pianese
Matelica (F2)	3-3 (aet)	(F3) Termoli
Terracina (G2)	1-2	(G3) San Cesareo
Taranto (H2)	1-1 (aet)	(H4) MonosPolis
Akragas (I2)	3-1 (aet)	(I3) Agropoli

=== Third round ===
- Played on 18 May 2014
- Single-legged matches played at best-placed club's home field
- Games ending in a tie are extended to penalty kicks without playing extra time
- Arezzo qualified directly as the best ranked semifinalist of Coppa Italia Serie D

Team 1	Score	Team 2
Matelica (I2)	0-0 (2-0 pen.)	(C3) Sacilese
Correggese (D2)	2-0	(B2) Olginatese
Foligno (E2)	1-2	(A2) Borgosesia
Akragas (I2)	4-2	(G3) San Cesareo
Taranto (H2)	0-1	(E3) Arezzo

=== Fourth round ===
- Played on 25 May 2014
- Single-legged matches played on best-placed club's home ground
- Games ending in a tie are extended to penalty kicks without play extra time
- Pontisola qualified directly as the finalist of Coppa Italia Serie D

Team 1	Score	Team 2
Correggese (D2)	1-1 (5-4 pen.)	(B6) Pontisola
Matelica (F2)	2-0	(A2) Borgosesia
Akragas (I2)	1-0	(E3) Arezzo

=== Semifinals ===
- Played on 1 June 2014
- On home team's ground
- Games ending in a tie are extended to penalty kicks without playing extra time
- Pomigliano qualified directly as the winner of Coppa Italia Serie D

Team 1	Score	Team 2
Correggese (D2)	2–1	(F2) Matelica
Akragas (I2)	3–1	(I11) Pomigliano

=== Final ===
- Played on 8 June 2014
- On neutral ground at Stadio Flaminio, Rome

Team 1	Score	Team 2
Correggese (D2)	1-1 (7-6 pen.)	(I2) Akragas

== Relegation play-off ==
- Played on 18 May 2014
- Single-legged matches played on best-placed club's home ground
- In case of tied score, extra time is played; if score is still level, best-placed team wins
- Team highlighted in green is saved, other is relegated to Eccellenza

Team 1	Score	Team 2
(A) Derthona	2-0	Pro Dronero
(A) Albese	1-3 (aet)	Sestri Levante
(B) MapelloBonate	0-0 (aet)	Gozzano
(B) Borgomanero	1-0	AlzanoCene
(C) Vittorio Falmec	0-1 (aet)	Dro
(C) Monfalcone	0-1	Mezzocorona
(D) Camaiore	1-3	Atletico Montichiari
(E) Bastia	1-1 (aet)	Deruta
(F) Sulmona	0-3	Amiternina
(G) Budoni	2-1	Arzachena
(G) Latte Dolce	1-2	Selargius
(H) Real Vico Equense	1-2	Grottaglie
(H) Puteolana Internapoli	1-1 (aet)	Real Metapontino
(I) Città di Messina	0-1	Due Torri
