= 2012–13 Eccellenza =

The 2012–13 Eccellenza was the twenty-second season of the Eccellenza, the sixth tier of the Italian football league system, organized regionally.

What follows is a list of division winners and playoff matches.

== Promoted teams ==
Region/Girone	Promoted in Serie D	National Playoffs	Promotion to Serie D after the play-offs
Abruzzo	Sulmona	Giulianova	Giulianova (repechage)
Apulia	San Severo	Manfredonia	Manfredonia
Basilicata	Real Metapontino	GR Valdiano	—N/a
Calabria	Nuova Gioiese	Rende	Rende (repechage)
Campania Girone A	Progreditur Marcianise	Stasia	—N/a
Campania Girone B	(bought Real Hyria Nola's sports title)	Torrecuso	Torrecuso
Emilia-Romagna Girone A	Lupa Piacenza	Correggese	Correggese (repechage)
Emilia-Romagna Girone B	Romagna Centro	Imolese	Imolese
Friuli-Venezia Giulia	Monfalcone	Triestina	Triestina (repechage)
Lazio Girone A	Santa Maria Mole	Fregene	—N/a
Lazio Girone B	Monterotondo Lupa	Terracina	Terracina
Liguria	Vado	Finale	—N/a
Lombardy Girone A	Inveruno	Sestese	—N/a
Lombardy Girone B	Giana Erminio	Sancolombano	Sancolombano (repechage)
Lombardy Girone C	Palazzolo	Scanzopedrengo	—N/a
Marche	Matelica; US Fermana (as winner of Coppa Italia Dilettanti; went bankrupt)	Montegranaro	Fermana FC (merger of Montegranaro and ACF Fermo)
Molise	Bojano	Fornelli	—N/a
Piedmont Girone A	Borgomanero	Borgopal	—N/a
Piedmont Girone B	Albese	Pro Dronero	Pro Dronero
Sardinia	Olbia	Latte Dolce	Latte Dolce (repechage)
Sicily Girone A	Akragas	Atletico Campofranco	—N/a
Sicily Girone B	Orlandina	Due Torri	Due Torri (repechage)
Tuscany Girone A	Jolly Montemurlo	PesciaUzzanese	—N/a
Tuscany Girone B	Olimpia Colligiana	SanGiovanniValdarno	—N/a
Trentino-Alto Adige/Südtirol	Dro	San Martino Passiria	—N/a
Umbria	Narnese	Subasio	—N/a
Veneto Girone A	Marano	Thermal Abano Teolo	Thermal Abano Teolo
Veneto Girone B	Vittorio Falmec	Ripa La Fenadora	Ripa La Fenadora (repechage)

=== National play-offs ===
==== Semifinal and final ====
Semifinals
1	Borgopal	0	1	1
4	Sancolombano	1	1	2
3	Giulianova	0	1	1
2	Imolese	3	1	4

Finals
Sancolombano	0	0	0
Imolese	1	1	2

Semifinals
1	U. Ripa La Fenadora	1	1	2
4	Sestese	0	0	0
3	Thermal Abano Teolo	1	1	2
2	Scanzopedrengo	0	0	0

Finals
U. Ripa La Fenadora	2	1	3
Thermal Abano Teolo	0	4	4

Semifinals
1	Finale	0	0	0
4	Pro Dronero	0	1	1
3	Triestina	2	2	4
2	San Martino Passiria	1	1	2

Finals
Pro Dronero	1	3	4
Triestina	1	3	4

Semifinals
1	Subasio	1	0	1
4	Correggese	1	0	1
3	Terracina	2	2	4
2	SanGiovanniValdarno	1	2	3

Finals
Correggese	2	1	3
Terracina	1	3	4

Semifinals
1	PesciaUzzanese	0	0	2
4	Montegranaro (pen)	0	0	4
3	Latte Dolce	0	2	2
2	Fregene	0	2	2

Finals
Montegranaro	1	2	3
Latte Dolce	0	2	2

Semifinals
1	Rende	1	0	1
4	Manfredonia	2	3	5
3	GR Valdiano	0	2	2
2	Atletico Campofranco	1	2	3

Finals
Manfredonia	4	0	4
Atletico Campofranco	0	1	1

Semifinals
1	Fornelli	0	1	1
4	Torrecuso	0	5	5
3	Stasia	1	0	1
2	Due Torri	1	1	2

Finals
Torrecuso	3	1	4
Due Torri	1	2	3
