= Vito Falconieri =

Italian footballer

Personal information
- Date of birth: 18 June 1986 (age 40)
- Place of birth: Brindisi, Italy
- Height: 1.85 m (6 ft 1 in)
- Position: Forward

Team information
- Current team: Martina

Youth career
- Torino

Senior career*
Years	Team	Apps	(Gls)
2005–2006	Casale	13	(1)
2006	Montichiari	11	(1)
2006–2007	Brindisi	29	(11)
2007–2009	Catania	3	(1)
2007–2008	→ Gela (loan)	17	(3)
2008	→ Catanzaro (loan)	11	(4)
2008–2009	→ Reggiana (loan)	11	(2)
2009–2013	Ascoli	22	(2)
2009–2010	→ Taranto (loan)	17	(1)
2010–2011	→ L'Aquila (loan)	19	(4)
2012–2013	→ Crotone (loan)	9	(2)
2013–2015	Parma	0	(0)
2013–2014	→ Gubbio (loan)	21	(5)
2014–2015	→ Pavia (loan)	14	(0)
2015	→ Santarcangelo (loan)	11	(4)
2015–2016	Altovicentino	28	(12)
2016	Grosseto	13	(4)
2016–2017	San Severo	11	(6)
2017	Lentigione Calcio	11	(2)
2017–2019	Spoleto		
2019–2020	Corato		
2020–2021	Anconitana		
2021	Città Di Mola		
2022–	Martina		
- * Club domestic league appearances and goals

Vito Falconieri (born 18 June 1986) is an Italian footballer who plays for Martina in Eccellenza.

== Club career ==
=== Early career ===
Born in Brindisi, Apulia, Falconieri was a player of Torino Calcio's reserve team in 2004–05 season. He also wore no. 32 shirt with the first team.

=== Catania ===
In 2007 Falconieri joined Calcio Catania, however he was farmed to Gela along with Iannelli (loan), Bucolo (loan), Monastra (co-ownership) and Tedesco (co-ownership).

Falconieri made his Serie A debut on 26 April 2009 against U.S. Lecce.

On 23 May 2009, Falconieri scored his first Serie A goal on a volley from 30 metres (98 ft) away, as Catania defeated S.S.C. Napoli 3–1 at the Stadio Angelo Massimino.

=== Ascoli ===
In June 2009, Catania confirmed the purchase of Italian U-21 international Giuseppe Bellusci from Ascoli Calcio while Falconieri and teammate Marcello Gazzola were sold to Ascoli Calcio in joint-ownership deals. On 31 August 2009, it was confirmed that Ascoli and Catania agreed to loan the player to third division club Taranto Sport.

In 2010, Falconieri was loaned out to L'Aquila.

On 31 August 2012 Falconieri was signed by F.C. Crotone in a temporary deal, with Massimo Loviso moved to opposite direction. He wore no.8 shirt.

=== Later career ===
In July 2013 he was sold outright to Parma, who in turn sent him on loan to Gubbio. In September 2015, after being released following the bankruptcy of Parma, he signed with Altovicentino, a Serie D team.

On 23 July 2016 he signed for Grosseto, again in Serie D.

On December of the same year, Falconieri moved definitively to San Severo, another team of Serie D.
