= Giuseppe Raffaele =

Italian footballer and coach

Personal information
- Full name: Giuseppe Raffaele Addamo
- Date of birth: 5 December 1975 (age 50)
- Place of birth: Barcellona Pozzo di Gotto, Italy
- Position: Striker

Senior career*
Years	Team	Apps	(Gls)
- Marsala
- Igea Virtus
- Sciacca
- Sancataldese
- Locri
- Vittoria
- Monturanese
- Castrovillari
- Scalea

Managerial career
- 2006–2011: Due Torri
- 2011–2012: Akragas
- 2012–2014: Orlandina
- 2014–2018: Igea Virtus
- 2018: ACR Messina
- 2018–2020: Potenza
- 2020–2021: Catania
- 2021: Viterbese
- 2022–2023: Potenza
- 2024–2025: Audace Cerignola
- 2025–2026: Salernitana
- * Club domestic league appearances and goals

Giuseppe Raffaele (born 5 December 1975) is an Italian professional association football coach.

== Playing career ==
Raffaele's playing career was spent entirely in the amateur leagues of Sicily and Calabria as a striker and started in 1991 at Marsala. Then he played for Igea Virtus, Sciacca, Sancataldese, Locri, Vittoria, Monturanese, Castrovillari and Scalea. In 2006, he retired due to a serious injury.

== Coaching career ==
He started his coaching career in 2006 with small Sicilian amateurs Due Torri, which he led in 2011 up to the national promotion playoff finals of the Eccellenza league.

After a season at Eccellenza level with Akragas in 2013, he guided Orlandina to win promotion to Serie D. After being sacked in February 2014, he was hired in December 2014 by Igea Virtus, the club from his hometown, which he guided to win promotion to Serie D by the end of the season.

He stayed on as an Igea Virtus head coach until 2018, after which he was hired by ACR Messina, with whom, however, he did not even start the season. Later, in October 2018, he was instead given his first professional job as the new head coach of Serie C's Potenza, guiding the Rossoblu to fifth and fourth place in the two seasons in charge of the club.

He was subsequently hired as the new head coach of Catania for the 2020–21 season. However, he was sacked on 18 March 2021 following a string of negative results.

On 4 October 2021, Raffaele took over as the new head coach of Serie C club Viterbese, replacing Alessandro Dal Canto. He was sacked himself a month later, on 7 November 2021, due to poor results.

On 25 October 2022, he returned to Potenza, agreeing to a contract until 30 June 2023 with an option to extend it for one more year. He left the club by the end of the season despite having a contract for one more year. He rescinded his contract with Potenza on 7 December 2023, after having declined for personal reasons to return to the club following the dismissal of incumbent head coach Franco Lerda.

On 11 March 2024, Raffaele was hired as the new head coach of Audace Cerignola until the end of the season. Under his tenure, Audace Cerignola ended the season in second place, outperforming all expectations and putting Raffaele's name in the spotlight.

On 2 July 2025, Serie C club Salernitana announced the appointment of Raffaele as their new head coach.

Giuseppe Raffaele's experience with Salernitana began very well, thanks to five consecutive victories. However, the results subsequently became disappointing, leaving Salernitana in a distant third place in the league table behind Benevento and Catania. On February 23, 2026, Salernitana announced the dismissal of Giuseppe Raffaele as first-team coach.
