= Alessandro Cesca =

Italian footballer (born 1980)

Personal information
- Date of birth: 1 December 1980 (age 45)
- Place of birth: Latisana, Italy
- Height: 1.88 m (6 ft 2 in)
- Position: Forward

Youth career
- 1996–1997: Milan

Senior career*
Years	Team	Apps	(Gls)
1997–1998	Milan	0	(0)
1998	Atletico Milan	2	(0)
1998–1999	Sancolombano	14	(1)
1999–2001	Sacilese		
2001–2003	Tamai	54	(16)
2003–2004	Sanvitese	22	(5)
2004–2005	Nuorese	17	(12)
2005–2006	Tamai	33	(19)
2006–2009	Bassano Virtus	58	(21)
2009	Portosummaga	15	(1)
2009–2011	San Marino	44	(26)
2011–2012	Carpi	30	(11)
2012–2013	Pavia	44	(8)
2013–2014	Bellaria	14	(3)
2014	Rimini	9	(0)
2014–2015	Cosenza	17	(1)
2015	Acqui	11	(1)
2015–2016	Pergolettese	19	(6)
2016	Correggese	3	(0)
2016–2017	Adriese	19	(7)
2017–2018	Treviso		

International career
1996–1997	Italy U-16	5	(1)
- * Club domestic league appearances and goals

Alessandro Cesca (born 1 December 1980) is an Italian former professional football player.

Cesca joined Carpi F.C. 1909 in January 2011. In July 2011 he signed a new 4-year contract with Carpi (along with Giacomo Cenetti), Cesca was transferred to A.C. Pavia in January 2012. In mid-2013 he was signed by Bellaria. On 9 January 2014 he was signed by Rimini.
