= Mirko Giacobbe =

Italian footballer

Personal information
- Date of birth: 26 July 1992 (age 34)
- Place of birth: San Giorgio a Cremano, Italy
- Height: 1.88 m (6 ft 2 in)
- Position: Midfielder

Team information
- Current team: Manfredonia

Youth career
- Neapolis

Senior career*
Years	Team	Apps	(Gls)
2010	Neapolis	1	(0)
2010–2012	Portosummaga	15	(1)
2012	→ Bassano (loan)	4	(0)
2013–2014	Real Metapontino	9	(0)
2014–2016	Due Torri	27	(4)
2016	Castrovillari	1	(0)
2016	Due Torri	13	(2)
2016–2017	Frattese	15	(2)
2017	Sporting Ercolano	10	(0)
2017–2018	Aversa Normanna	19	(10)
2018–2019	Campobasso	37	(7)
2019	Savoia	8	(0)
2019–2022	Legnago Salus	79	(6)
2022–2023	Albalonga	26	(3)
2023–	Manfredonia	4	(1)
- * Club domestic league appearances and goals as of 1 October 2023

Mirko Giacobbe (born 26 July 1992) is an Italian footballer who plays as a midfielder for Serie D club Manfredonia.

== Career ==
=== Legnago Salus ===
In December 2019, Giacobbe joined Serie D club Legnago Salus.
