= Francesco Di Gennaro =

Italian footballer

Personal information
- Date of birth: 5 December 1982 (age 43)
- Place of birth: Naples, Italy
- Height: 1.85 m (6 ft 1 in)
- Position: Forward

Youth career
- Napoli
- 2001–2002: Pescara

Senior career*
Years	Team	Apps	(Gls)
2002	Terracina	4	(0)
2002–2004	Formia	44	(22)
2004–2005	Ferentino	24	(17)
2005–2006	Virtus Lanciano	18	(9)
2006–2007	Lucchese	42	(12)
2007–2010	Gallipoli	77	(30)
2010	Verona	13	(2)
2010–2011	Virtus Lanciano	29	(6)
2011–2012	Barletta	18	(2)
2012–2013	Matera	30	(11)
2013–2014	Metapontino	17	(6)
2014–2015	Campobasso	31	(8)
2015–2016	Grosseto	28	(7)
2016–2017	Francavilla		
2017–2019	Lanciano		
Total		375	(132)
- * Club domestic league appearances and goals

Francesco Di Gennaro (born 5 December 1982) is an Italian former footballer who plays as a forward.

== Career ==
=== Early life ===
Born in Naples, Campania, Di Gennaro started his senior career at Serie D (Italian fifth division until 2014) club Terracina and Eccellenza Lazio (Italian sixth division) club Formia. He also played for Abruzzo club Pescara in reserve league in 2001–02 and hometown club SSC Napoli in 2000–01 season.

=== Professional career ===
In May 2004 he signed a pre-contract with his first fully professional club SS Lanciano from Abruzzo region but loaned back to Serie D club Ferentino (D for amateur (Italian: dilettanti), in fact semi-pro), also from the region of Lazio. On 30 December 2004 he returned to Lanciano but FIGC void the pre-contract with Lanciano on 31 January 2005, confirming the relationship with Ferentino. He finally played for Lanciano in 2005–06 season. However, in January 2006 he was signed by Lucchese. He scored 17 goals combined in 2005–06 Serie C1, as second-top-scorer behind Emanuele Calaiò. However, in the next season he only scored 3 goals for Lucchese. In July 2007 he left for fellow third division club Gallipoli along with Alessandro Monticciolo. He was suspended once in 2007–08 Serie C1. He won the champion with the club in 2009, as group B winner, which now called Lega Pro Prima Divisione. He also won Supercoppa di Lega di Prima Divisione with club, winning group A winner Cesena. However the club faced financial difficulties and only a few first team players remained, one of them was Di Gennaro. The difficulties solved by a takeover from Udine investor in August 2009. Di Gennaro scored 4 goals in his first Serie B seasons before left the club in mid-season. In January 2010 third division club Verona signed him. However, he only scored twice in 2009–10 Lega Pro Prima Divisione. His contract was terminated in mutual consent in July 2010. Di Gennaro re-joined Lanciano in September 2010, now run as SS Virtus Lanciano 1924 Srl since the bankruptcy of previous entity. He only scored 6 goals in 2010–11 Lega Pro Prima Divisione. In July 2011 he was signed by his fifth third division club Barletta. In September 2012 his contract was terminated again in mutual consent.

=== Serie D ===
In September 2012 he joined Serie D team Matera Calcio which newly relocated from Irsina to Matera, which the club succeed FC Matera to represent the city but yet to acquire the sports title won by the old club. He scored 10 goals in 2012–13 Serie D. However, he only played 4 times in 2013–14 Serie D for Matera without a goal. In December 2013 he left for Metapontino, joining namesake Biagio Di Gennaro.

== Honours ==
Gallipoli

- Supercoppa di Lega di Prima Divisione: 2009
  - Lega Pro Prima Divisione: 2009
