= Gianluca Franciosi =

Italian footballer

Personal information
- Date of birth: 10 January 1991 (age 35)
- Place of birth: Monfalcone, Italy
- Height: 1.76 m (5 ft 9 in)
- Position: Forward

Team information
- Current team: ASD Bisiaca Romana

Youth career
- –2010: Atalanta

Senior career*
Years	Team	Apps	(Gls)
2010–2012	Valenzana	25	(2)
2012	Giacomense	8	(0)
2012–2013	Triestina	27	(13)
2013–2014	Clodiense	32	(13)
2014–2015	Thermal Teolo	32	(6)
2015	Correggese	9	(1)
2015–2016	Este	5	(0)
2016–2017	Gorica	8	(0)
2017	→ Brda (loan)	4	(0)
2017	Tamai	10	(2)
2017–2018	FC Calvi Noale	15	(4)
2018–2019	Campodarsego	31	(7)
2019–	ASD Chions	0	(0)

International career
2009	Italy U18	2	(0)
- * Club domestic league appearances and goals as of 14:49, 5 August 2019 (UTC)

Gianluca Franciosi (born 10 January 1991) is an Italian footballer who plays for ASD Bisiaca Romana.

== Club career ==
Born in Monfalcone, in the Province of Gorizia, Italy, near to Italy–Slovenia border and Slovenian town Nova Gorica (new "Gorizia"), Franciosi started his professional career at Lega Pro Seconda Divisione club Valenzana. The club signed him from Atalanta B.C. in a co-ownership deal. He played in 2010–11 Italian Lega Pro Cup. That season Franciosi was the member of both first team and the reserves. In June 2011 Atalanta gave up the remain 50% registration rights of Franciosi to Valenzana for free. In January 2012 Franciosi was signed by fellow fourth tier club Giacomense.

In summer 2012 Franciosi left for Eccellenza (sixth tier at that time) newcomer Triestina. He scored 13 goals to bring the refounded club promoted to Serie D.

In summer 2013 Franciosi was signed by another Serie D club Clodiense. The club did not promote to the new third tier of Italian football, the unified single division of Lega Pro.

Franciosi remained in Serie D from 2014 to 2016, now fourth tier of Italian football, for Thermal Teolo, Correggese and Este. He only scored seven goals in one and a half seasons.

In June 2016 Franciosi crossed the border to join ND Gorica, where he participated in 2016–17 UEFA Europa League first qualifying round. Franciosi also played for Gorica in February in a club friendly.

Ahead of the 2019–20 season, Franciosi joined ASD Chions.

== International career ==
Franciosi received a call-up to Italy national under-18 football team for a tournament in Slovakia in April 2009. He was a replacement of Marco D'Alessandro.

In the tournament he was the substitutes of Luca Tremolada and Matteo Calamai respectively.
