= Tommaso Gattoni =

Italian footballer

Personal information
- Date of birth: 19 August 1993 (age 33)
- Place of birth: Venice, Italy
- Height: 1.83 m (6 ft 0 in)
- Position: Midfielder

Team information
- Current team: Bassano

Senior career*
| Years | Team | Apps | (Gls) |
| 2010–2013 | San Donà | 61 | (6) |
| 2013–2014 | Marano | 27 | (0) |
| 2014 | AltoVicentino | 0 | (0) |
| 2014–2015 | Real Agro Aversa | 2 | (0) |
| 2015–2018 | Delta Porto Tolle | 88 | (10) |
| 2018 | Pro Piacenza | 0 | (0) |
| 2018–2019 | Caronnese | 31 | (3) |
| 2019–2024 | Pro Sesto | 162 | (6) |
| 2024–2025 | Caldiero Terme | 36 | (0) |
| 2025– | Bassano | 18 | (1) |
- * Club domestic league appearances and goals as of 22 February 2026

Tommaso Gattoni (born 19 August 1993) is an Italian professional footballer who plays as a midfielder for Serie D club Bassano.

== Club career ==
Gattoni started his career in Serie D clubs, and made his Serie C and professional debut for Real Agro Aversa in 2014.

On 14 July 2019, he joined Serie C club Pro Sesto.
