= Mattia Turetta =

Italian footballer

Personal information
- Full name: Mattia Turetta
- Date of birth: 26 February 1984 (age 42)
- Place of birth: Padua, Italy
- Height: 1.70 m (5 ft 7 in)
- Position: Midfielder

Team information
- Current team: Montegrotto Terme

Youth career
- 199?–199?: Torreglia
- 199?–2001: Padova
- 2001–2004: Brescia

Senior career*
Years	Team	Apps	(Gls)
2003–2004	Brescia	0	(0)
2004–2007	Pro Sesto	67	(3)
2007–2008	Massese	9	(2)
2008	Sassuolo	8	(0)
2008–2010	Bassano Virtus	38	(1)
2010	Poggibonsi	11	(0)
2010–2011	SandonàJesolo	27	(3)
2012–2013	Este	42	(0)
2014	Campodarsego	?	(?)
2014–2016	Mestrino	23+	(1)
2016–2017	Sitland Rivereel	?	(?)
2017	Thermal Teolo	10	(0)
2017–2019	Janus Nova 2017	7+	(?)
2019–2021	Le Torri Bertesina	15+	(?)
2021-2023	Montegrotto Terme	?	(2)

Managerial career
- 2023–2024: Montegrotto Terme
- * Club domestic league appearances and goals as of November 2024 ‡ National team caps and goals as of November 2024

Mattia Turetta (born 26 February 1984) is an Italian professional football manager and former professional player.

== Career ==
=== Club career ===
Grew up in Torreglia, Padova and Brescia. Debuts with Brescia in 2003 UEFA Intertoto Cup against Gloria Bistriţa. In 2008, he was promoted to Serie B with Sassuolo. In February 2012 moves to Este in Serie D. 20 February 2014 signing up for the Campodarsego in Eccellenza. In August 2014 moves to Mestrino in Promozione (14-15) and Eccellenza (15-16). In summer 2016 moves to Sitland Rivereel (Barbarano Vicentino) in Promozione. In summer 2017 moves to Thermal Teolo in Promozione. In dicembre 2017 moves to Janus Nova 2017 (Selvazzano Dentro) in Prima Categoria. In 2019 moves to Le Torri Bertesina (Torri di Quartesolo) in Prima Categoria. In 2021 moves to Le Montegrotto Terme in Prima Categoria.

In 2023, he retires from playing football.

== Managerial career ==
After his retirement, he becomes the new coach of Montegrotto Terme in Prima Categoria. In May 2024, he was confirmed as coach of Montegrotto Terme.
