= Abdoulaye Sall =

Senegalese footballer

Personal information
- Date of birth: 28 December 2000 (age 25)
- Place of birth: Senegal
- Height: 1.82 m (6 ft 0 in)
- Position: Forward

Team information
- Current team: Carpi
- Number: 23

Youth career
- –2019: Pro Dronero
- 2019–2020: Imolese

Senior career*
Years	Team	Apps	(Gls)
2018–2019	Pro Dronero	32	(14)
2019–2022	Imolese	17	(1)
2022	Ghiviborgo	16	(5)
2022–	Carpi	119	(22)
- * Club domestic league appearances and goals as of 30 April 2026

Abdoulaye Sall (born 28 December 2000) is a Senegalese professional footballer who plays as a forward for Serie C Group A club Carpi.

== Career statistics ==
=== Club ===
As of 1 July 2020.

Club	Season	League			Cup		Other		Total	
Club	Season	Division	Apps	Goals	Apps	Goals	Apps	Goals	Apps	Goals
Imolese	2019–20	Serie C	4	1	1 (Note: Appearance(s) in the Copa Italia)	0	2 (Note: Appearance(s) in the Relegation play-outs)	0	7	1
Career total			4	1	1	0	2	0	7	1
