= Dardan Vuthaj =

Albanian footballer (born 1995)

Personal information
- Date of birth: 30 September 1995 (age 31)
- Place of birth: Patras, Greece
- Height: 1.84 m (6 ft 0 in)
- Position: Forward

Team information
- Current team: Ligorna
- Number: 99

Youth career
- –2013: Genoa
- 2012–2013: → Savona (loan)

Senior career*
Years	Team	Apps	(Gls)
2012–2013	Genoa	0	(0)
2012–2013	→ Savona (loan)	2	(0)
2014	Chiavari Caperana	11	(1)
2014	Bra	7	(1)
2015	San Donato	14	(1)
2015–2016	Laçi	5	(0)
2017	Monopoli	12	(1)
2017–2018	Delta Rovigo	29	(11)
2018–2019	Campodarsego	34	(16)
2019–2020	Imolese	23	(2)
2020–2021	Rimini	33	(21)
2021–2022	Novara	35	(35)
2022–2023	Foggia	15	(3)
2023	→ Novara (loan)	12	(3)
2023–2024	Crotone	15	(2)
2024	Cerignola	13	(4)
2024	Egnatia	12	(2)
2024–2025	Chieti	25	(7)
2025–	Ligorna	16	(17)

International career
2012	Albania U17	1	(0)
2012–2013	Albania U19	3	(0)
- * Club domestic league appearances and goals as of 25 June 2026

Dardan Vuthaj (born 30 September 1995) is an Albanian footballer who plays as a forward for Italian Serie D club Ligorna.

== Club career ==
=== Early career ===
Vuthaj started his career as part of the Genoa youth academy. He was loaned out to Savona in the summer of 2012 in order to gain more experience, and he made his senior debut with the club in the Lega Pro Seconda Divisione on 11 November 2012 against Castiglione, coming on as a 75th-minute substitute for Ignazio Carta in a 2–1 loss. He made two appearances for the Savona first team during the 2012–13 campaign as they went on to finish second and earn promotion to the Lega Pro Prima Divisione. He also played for the club's youth team, scoring 9 goals in 12 games during his loan spell. He returned to the Genoa Primavera side where he spent the first half of the 2013–14 season before joining Serie D side Chiavari Calcio Caperana in January 2014, where he made 11 appearances and also scored his first senior career goal before leaving the club at the end of the season. Vuthaj joined another Serie D side Bra on 7 November 2014 as a free agent, making 7 appearances and scoring once during his short spell with the club. He then left to join fellow Serie D side San Donato in December 2014. Vuthaj featured in 14 games and scored once for San Donato during the second half of the campaign before leaving the club at the end of the season.

=== KF Laçi ===
After spending his entire youth and senior career in Italy, Vuthaj moved to Albania, the country of his parents' birth, to join Albanian Superliga side KF Laci.

=== Imolese ===
On 15 July 2019, he joined Serie C club Imolese on a one-year contract with an option to extend it for another year.

=== Novara ===
He played the 2021–22 season with Serie D club Novara, which he led to promotion to Serie C scoring 35 goals in 35 games, making him the most prolific football player in the Italian top four leagues.

=== Foggia ===
On 1 September 2022, Vuthaj signed a two-year contract with Foggia. On 26 January 2023, he returned to Novara on loan. Vuthaj's contract with Foggia was terminated by mutual consent on 28 August 2023.

=== Crotone ===
On 30 August 2023, Vuthaj signed with Crotone for one year, with an option to extend.

== International career ==
Vuthaj was a youth international for Albania.

== Personal life ==
Vuthaj was born in Patras, Greece to Albanian parents, then moving to Liguria as a child with his family.

== Career statistics ==
=== Club ===
As of As of match played 11 June 2022

Club	Season	League			Cup		Other		Total	
Club	Season	Division	Apps	Goals	Apps	Goals	Apps	Goals	Apps	Goals
Savona (loan)	2012–13	Lega Pro 2	2	0	—		0	0	2	0
Chiavari Caperana	2013–14	Serie D	11	1	—		0	0	11	1
Bra	2014–15	Serie D	7	1	—		0	0	7	1
San Donato	2014–15	Serie D	14	1	—		0	0	14	1
Laçi	2015–16	Albanian Superliga	5	0	4	1	0	0	9	1
Monopoli	2016–17	Lega Pro	12	1	—		0	0	12	1
Delta Rovigo	2017–18	Serie D	29	11	—		0	0	29	11
Campodarsego	2018–19	Serie D	34	16	1	0	0	0	34	16
Imolese	2019–20	Serie C	23	2	3	1	0	0	26	3
Rimini	2020–21	Serie D	33	21	—		0	0	33	21
Novara	2021–22	Serie D	35	35	—		0	0	35	35
Career total			205	89	8	2	0	0	212	91
