= Gerónimo Beato =

Uruguayan footballer (born 1995)

Personal information
- Full name: Gerónimo Beato Pessina
- Date of birth: 10 November 1995 (age 31)
- Place of birth: Montevideo, Uruguay
- Position: Midfielder

Youth career
- River Plate

Senior career*
| Years | Team | Apps | (Gls) |
| 2014 | Ripa La Fenadora | 1 | (0) |
| 2014–2015 | Lugano | 0 | (0) |
| 2015–2017 | Villa Teresa | 22 | (0) |
| 2018–2019 | Huracán | | |
| 2019 | Villa Teresa | 0 | (0) |
- * Club domestic league appearances and goals

Gerónimo Beato (born 10 November 1995 in Montevideo) is an Uruguayan footballer. He is the son of Vito Beato, who is a football manager.

== Club career ==
Born in Montevideo, Beato started in the youth levels of River Plate Montevideo.

In March 2014, he travelled to Italy to try luck on Serie D side Ripa La Fenadora. He could not play much after suffering a long injury and he left the club after finishing his contract, staying a long time without playing.

Later, he went to Switzerland signing with FC Lugano. He did not have minutes in the first team and remained some months till he finally returned to Uruguay to defend his father's coaching team Villa Teresa which had just promoted to Uruguayan Top Division.

After one year at Huracán, Beato returned to Villa Teresa in 2019.
