= Rocca Pendice =

Mountain in Italy

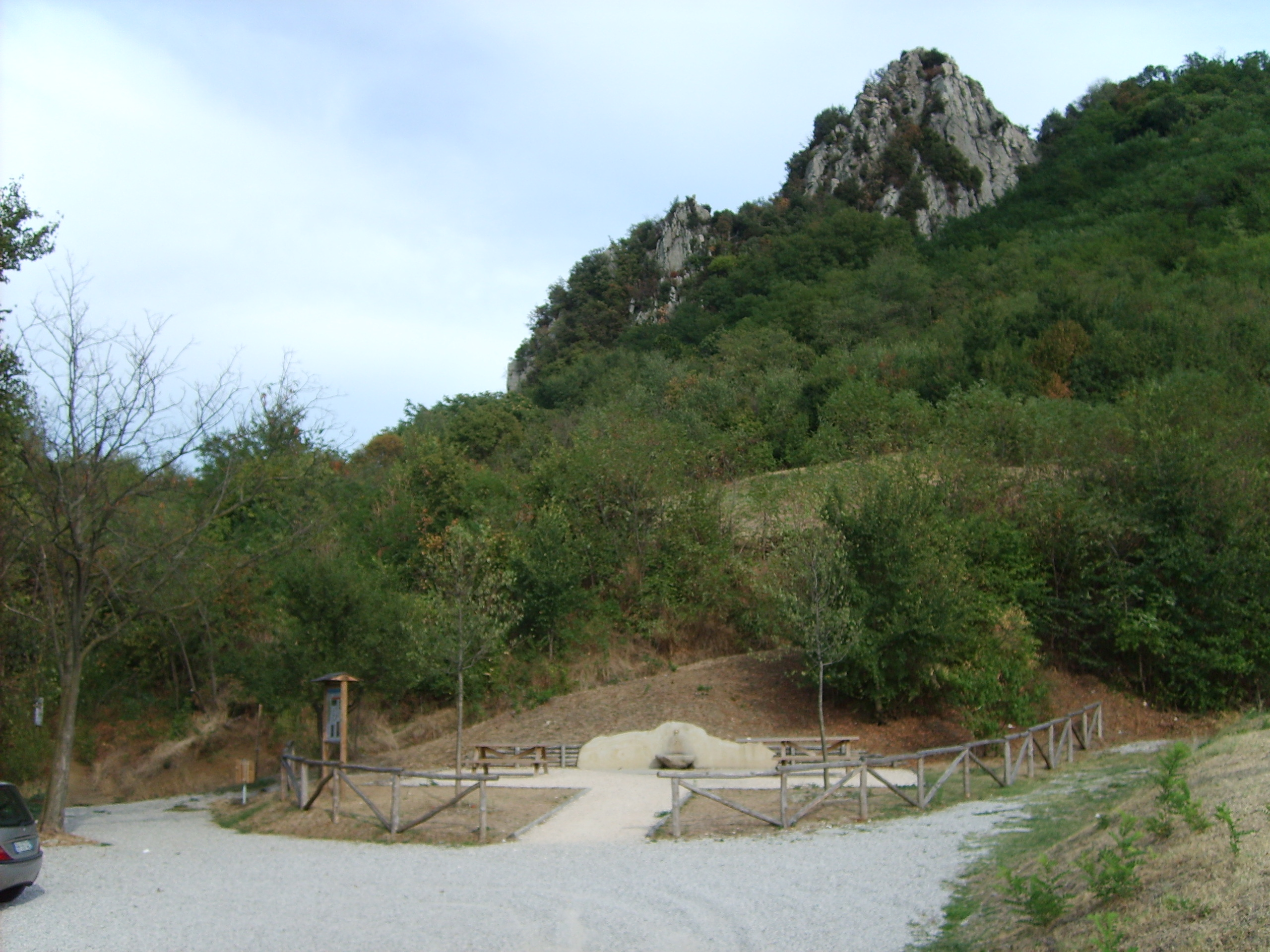

Highest point
- Elevation: 304 m (997 ft)
- Coordinates: 45°20′15″N 11°41′07″E

Geography
- Location: Teolo, Padua, Veneto, Italy
- Parent range: Euganean Hills

Geology
- Mountain type: Volcanic (trachyte)

Climbing
- Easiest route: Hiking trail from Teolo

Rocca Pendice (also known as Monte Pendice) is a mountain in the Euganean Hills of Veneto, Italy. It has an elevation of 304 metres (997 ft). Located in the municipality of Teolo in the Province of Padua, it is known for its distinctive vertical rock faces and medieval castle ruins.

== Geology ==
The mountain is a volcanic formation composed of alkaline quartzotrachyte, formed during the second eruptive cycle of the Euganean Hills. Its vertical cliffs contrast with the rounded profiles of surrounding hills, and the rock is popular for climbing.

== History ==
The name "Rocca Pendice" derives from a medieval fortress built near the summit, known as the Castello della Speronella. The castle dates from the 10th century and was constructed to defend against Hungarian invasions. Today only ruins remain.

== Rock Climbing ==
Rocca Pendice is an important rock climbing site with over 250 bolted routes. The first ascent of the east wall was made in 1909.

== Conservation ==
The mountain is part of the Euganean Hills Regional Park and has been designated a natural reserve. It provides habitat for protected species including the peregrine falcon.
