= Stadio Romeo Menti (disambiguation) =

Stadio Romeo Menti is the name of three stadiums in Italy:

- Stadio Romeo Menti (Vicenza)
- Stadio Romeo Menti (Castellammare di Stabia)
- Stadio Romeo Menti (Montichiari), home of F.C. Atletico Montichiari
