= Vuthaj =

Vuthaj may refer to:

- A settlement (Vusanje in Serbian, Vuthaj in Albanian), a small town in Montenegro
- Dardan Vuthaj (born 1995), Albanian football goalkeeper
