= Fermana FC =

Association football club in Italy

Fermana
- Full name: Fermana Football Club
- Nicknames: i Canarini (The Canaries) i Gialloblù (The Yellow & Blue)
- Founded: 1920; 1937 (refounded as GIL Fermo)
- Ground: Stadio Bruno Recchioni, Fermo, Italy
- Capacity: 9,500
- Chairman: Sergio Romoli
- Manager: Marco Sansovini
- League: Eccellenza
- 2024–25: Serie D Group F, 18th of 18 (relegated)
- Website: https://www.fermanafc.com/
Home colours	Away colours	Third colours

Fermana Football Club is an Italian professional football club based in Fermo, Marche. The club currently plays in Eccellenza Marche, the fifth tier of Italian football.

== History ==
=== Foundation ===
The club was founded in 1920 as S.S. La Fermo and was renamed in 1924 U.S. Fermana after the merger with Fermo F.C..

=== Fermana 1920 ===
In 1999 Fermana won the Serie C1/B title under head coach Ivo Iaconi, thus ensuring a historical first appearance into Serie B. That season proved to be the only one, as they were promptly relegated back into Serie C1.

Fermana relegated to Serie C2 after a disappointing 2005–06 Serie C1/A campaign ended in a poor last place, and 13 points in 34 matches. Following this relegation the club, under heavy financial struggles, were forced to give up their Serie C2 membership.

=== U.S. Fermana 2006 ===

A new club, named Unione Sportiva Fermana 2006, was founded in 2006 and admitted to Group A of amateur regional Prima Categoria (8th level of Italian football). They were promoted to Promozione in 2006–07, missing the chance to be promoted to Eccellenza after being defeated 2–1 (aggregate score) by Cuprense in the playoff finals. In season 2007–2008, Fermana won the championship, and it is promoted in Eccellenza, but Fermana ended the season in 7th place after a disastrous year behind rival Sambenedettese (who won the championship).

In 2010–2011, Fermana drew the game with Ancona 2–2, and lost the championship by one point. The 2011–2012 season opened with the Fermana in a more balanced league victory. In 2012–13 season it won Coppa Italia Dilettanti, but went bankrupt at the end of the season.

=== Fermana F.C. ===
In summer 2013 the club was refounded as Fermana Football Club after the merger of A.S.D. Montegranaro Calcio 1965 (winner of Eccellenza playoffs) and AFC Fermo restarting from Serie D. The club were Group F champions in 2016–17 Serie D and returned to the Italian third tier for the first time in 12 years.

== Colors and badge ==
The colors of the club are yellow and blue.

== Honours ==
- Coppa Italia Dilettanti:
  - Champion : 2012–13
