= Domenico Fontana (footballer) =

Italian footballer (born 1943)

Personal information
- Date of birth: January 16, 1943 (age 83)
- Place of birth: Marano Vicentino, Italy
- Height: 1.70 m (5 ft 7 in)
- Position: Midfielder

Senior career*
Years	Team	Apps	(Gls)
1963–1969	L.R. Vicenza	98	(7)
1969–1970	Milan	6	(0)
1970–1972	L.R. Vicenza	54	(4)
1972–1973	Napoli	9	(1)
1973–1975	L.R. Vicenza	19	(1)
1975–1976	Ravenna	0	(0)
- * Club domestic league appearances and goals

Domenico Fontana (born January 16, 1943) is a retired Italian professional football player.

He played 12 seasons (186 games, 13 goals) in the Serie A for L.R. Vicenza, A.C. Milan and S.S.C. Napoli.
