= Gattoni =

Gattoni is a surname. Notable people with the surname include:

- Federico Gattoni (born 1999), Argentine professional footballer
- Tommaso Gattoni (born 1993), Italian professional footballer
