= Marco Guzzo =

Italian footballer

Personal information
- Date of birth: 15 April 1994 (age 32)
- Place of birth: Montebelluna, Italy
- Position: Defender

Team information
- Current team: FC Nervesa

Youth career
- A.C. Milan
- 2012–2013: Hellas Verona

Senior career*
Years	Team	Apps	(Gls)
2013–2014	Siena	0	(0)
2013–2014	→ Virtus Verona (loan)	6	(0)
2014–2015	Montebelluna	27	(0)
2015–2016	Union Ripa La Fenadora	30	(1)
2016–2017	Union Feltre	34	(0)
2017–2018	Cjarlins Muzane	17	(0)
2018–2019	Montebelluna	28	(0)
2019–	FC Nervesa		
- * Club domestic league appearances and goals as of 15:23, 22 September 2019 (UTC)

Marco Guzzo (born 15 April 1994) is an Italian footballer who plays as a defender for FC Nervesa.

== Career ==
Guzzo was a player of A.C. Milan. He won the Allievi League with the under-17 team in 2011 as the captain. On 25 July 2012 Guzzo and Carlo Alberto Calvetti were signed by Hellas Verona F.C. in co-ownership deal for a peppercorn fee. In January 2013 Verona acquired Guzzo outright. On 29 January he moved to Serie A club Siena in another co-ownership for €275,000, as part of the deal that Paolo Grossi moved to Verona also for €275,000. Guzzo immediately moved back to Verona.

In July 2013 he remained in Verona for the third professional team of the city - newly promoted side Virtus Verona. He was booked in the match against Real Vicenza in 2013–14 Coppa Italia Lega Pro.
