= FC Valdagno =

Italian football club

Valdagno
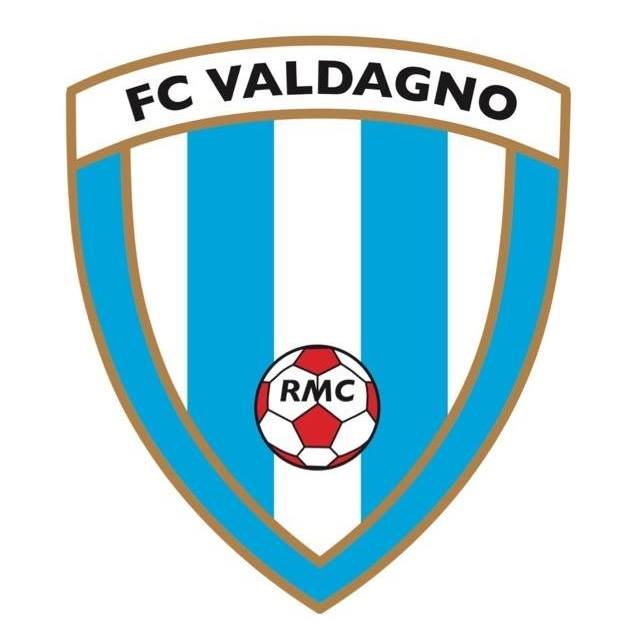
- Full name: Football Club Valdagno
- Founded: 1926; 100 years ago as, Dopolavoro Aziendale Marzotto Valdagno; 1928; 98 years ago as, A.C. Valdagno; 1946; 80 years ago as, A.C. Marzotto Valdagno (takeover); 1970; 56 years ago as, A.C. Valdagno; 1997; 29 years ago as, Associazione Calcio ThieneValdagno (merged); 1998; 28 years ago as, A.C. Nuova Valdagno (refounded); 2012; 14 years ago as, A.C.D. Trissino-Valdagno (merged); 2017; 9 years ago as, SSD ValdagnoVicenza Calcio (takeover); 2018; 8 years ago as, Football Club Valdagno
- Dissolved: 2025
- Ground: Stadio dei Fiori, Valdagno, Italy
- Capacity: 6,000
- 2013–14: Serie D/C, 9th (relegated after merged)

Football Club Valdagno is an Italian football club based in Valdagno, Veneto.

== History ==
The club was originally founded as Dopolavoro Aziendale Marzotto Valdagno, also known as FC Pasubio in 1926 and became AC Valdagno in 1928. In 1933 it was bought by the textile manufacturers Marzotto. It played in Serie B during the ‘50s. In 1997 it started the first of many confusing fusions with many clubs, which led to a long list of bankruptcies.

=== Before the merger ===
==== Nuova Valdagno ====
Dopolavoro Aziendale Marzotto (DAM) Valdagno was founded in 1926, later changing its name to A.C. Marzotto (after the Marzotto firm, owner of the team at the time) and with this name spent 10 seasons in Serie B. The club was later renamed A.C. Valdagno.

The side was refounded as A.C. Nuova Valdagno in 1998. In its last season, the team won Promozione and was promoted to Eccellenza Veneto. In summer 2012 it sold its sports title of Eccellenza to club A.S.D. Nuovo Calcio Grancona that was consequently renamed A.S.D. Boca Ascesa Val Liona.

=== After the merger ===
==== Trissino-Valdagno ====
A secondary club was founded in 2012 after the merger between A.C.D. Trissino and A.C. Nuova Valdagno.

The club was dissolved in 2014 after the merger with S.S.D. Calcio Marano, founding F.C.D. Altovicentino.

==== FC Valdagno ====
The current club was created in 2017 buying an Eccellenza club from ASD Leodari Vicenza SBF.

The club was dissolved in 2025 after the club president Dr. Roberto Maria Coda decided to leave FC Valdagno and start a new project named Vicenza City FC.

== Colors and badge ==
The team's colors are white and light blue.
