= ASD Vittorio Falmec San Martino Colle =

Italian football club

Vittorio Falmec
- Full name: Associazione Sportiva Dilettantistica Vittorio Falmec San Martino Colle
- Founded: 1922
- Ground: Paolo Barison, Vittorio Veneto, Italy
- Capacity: 2,500
- Chairman: (Italy) Luciano Posocco
- Manager: (Italy) Stefano Della Bella
- League: Serie D/C
- 2012–13: Eccellenza Veneto/B, 1st (promoted)
Home colours	Away colours

A.S.D. Vittorio Falmec San Martino Colle (or simply Vittorio Falmec) is an Italian football club based in Vittorio Veneto, Veneto.
Currently it plays in Italy's Serie D.

== History ==
Vittorio Falmec is a football club based in Vittorio Veneto, founded in 1922, initially under the name Associazione Sportiva Vittorio Veneto adopting the colors red and blue.

The company after just two years in the Prima Divisione Veneto promoted for the first time in its history to Serie C. In the 1941–1942 season debuted in fourteenth place, then, her journey in the third division went on after the War world where in Serie C 1942–1943 rossoblù were coached by Enrico Colombari and had players like Emilio Bergamini, Franco De Gregori and Lino Grava. Continue to participate in Serie C until 1947–1948 season when it was relegated to the newly formed Promozione Interregionale.

In 1949, the Vittorio Veneto due to financial problems went bankrupt and relegated to Seconda Divisione Veneta, where within five years after playing in regional amateur championship, it was promoted in Promozione Veneto in 1955–1956 season where it remained for five years, followed by the legendary return to Serie C in the 1961–1962 season in which it had soccer players like Paul Barison which has been named the city stadium, Giuseppe Bosco, Renato Faloppa, Raoul Bortoletto, Pilade Canutis, Guerrino Rossi, Nereus Manzardo, Agostino De Nardi, Odera Gon, Sergio Realini, Franco De Cecco and Romano Bernard.

However, after four years playing in Serie C, Vittorio Veneto relegated to Serie D and Promozione Veneto, having Narciso Soldan as coach and players like Livio Pin, Elvi Pianca, Francesco Casagrande, Franco Catto, Elisha Zerlin, Alberto Giacomin, and Eddo Carlet for a five-year row in the Campionato Interregionale from 1984 to 1989.

In 1996–97 season it was promoted again to Eccellenza Veneto.

After the merger with the Colle San Martino in 2005, it changed its name to A.S.D. Vittorio Falmec S. Martin Cole. The company with the new president Luciano Posocco competed in the League of Promozione Veneto finishing at the 10th place. In the following seasons it was landeding in the playoffs but wasn't promoted, but in the 2009–2010 season that thing change. In fact, in that year won the Promozione Veneto and finally made the jump to Eccellenza Veneto, and also won the Regional Cup. In the following year reached the final and won again by beating 1–0 Piovese. In the 2011–2012 season reached in the final again, but fails to win for the third time in a raw after being beaten by Real Vicenza with 2–0.

=== The return to Serie D ===
On 21 April 2013, Vittorio Falmec mathematically promoted with three matches remaining for the end of the championship of Eccellenza Veneto and returned to Serie D after 24 years.

== Colors and badge ==
The team's colors are red and blue.

== Honours ==
- Serie D:
  - Winner (1): 1960–61
- Eccellenza:
  - Winner (1): 2012–13
