= Borgosesia Calcio =

Italian football club

Borgosesia
- Full name: Borgosesia Calcio
- Founded: 1925; 101 years ago
- Ground: Stadio Comunale di Borgosesia; Borgosesia, Italy
- Capacity: 2,500
- Chairman: Michele Pizzi
- Manager: Thomas Forzatti
- League: Serie D
- 2023–24: Serie D/A, 20th (relegated)
Home colours	Away colours

Borgosesia Calcio is an Italian association football club, based in Borgosesia, Piedmont. Borgosesia currently plays in the Serie D.

== History ==
=== Foundation ===
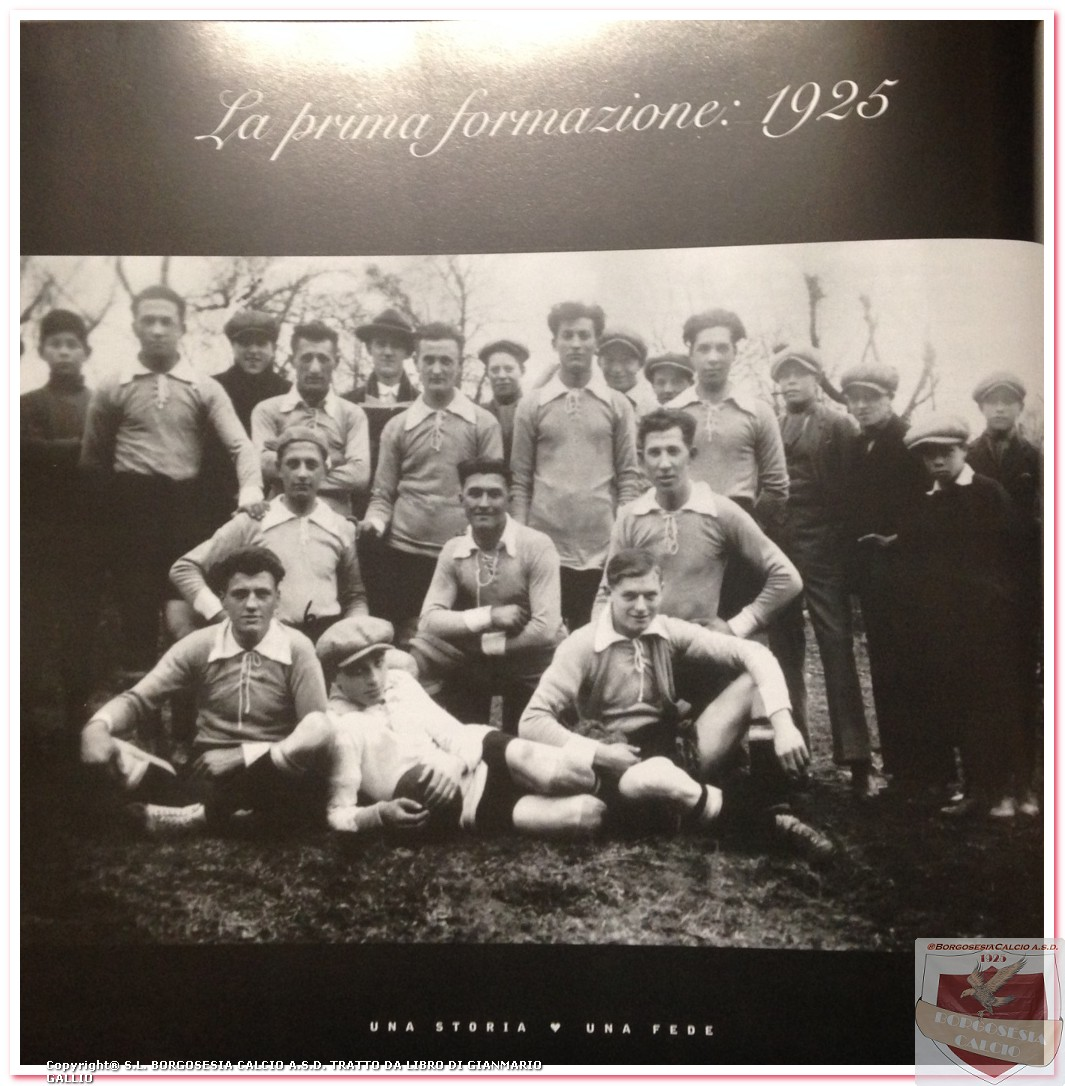

The club was born in 1925 as a result of the merger between Borgosesia Football Club and Vallana Trattoria, team of the district of Santa Maria, first president was elected Angelo Donati, with Vice President Franco Negri. The first color of the team was white, then became green. In contemporary society, from the field near the train station, moved to Viale Vittorio Veneto. In 1932 changed its name, becoming Associazione Sportiva Borgosesia.

In 1945 after World War II, the engineer Bozzola, with the help of some leaders reconstituted the company under the name Associazione Calcio Borgosesia. That year was chosen colors, the grenade, main color, was also coupled green of the beginnings.

=== Serie D ===
In 1952 the Borgosesia gained promotion to Division IV, the current Serie D. Coach of the team was Frederick Munerati. In 1954 the team was invited to a training of the Nazionale Italiana, then coached by Silvio Piola.

In 1968, after a tight battle with Suno, the Borgosesia played eight seasons in Serie D: the technicians of this streak were Tarabbia, Giancarlo Amadeo, Donna and Sturaro. The cycle is closed in 1976 with relegation.

In 1990 began a new era for the team, chaired by Mario Majolo and led by young technician Gianmario Arrondini, the transition from the conquered Prima Categoria to Promozione. Thanks to the reform and creation of a new category in 1991, Borgosesia obtained the repechage in Eccellenza.

In 1993, with coach Paul Rose, the association of Piedmont gained promotion in the Campionato Nazionale Dilettanti. It won this championship, which at the end of the season Campionato Nazionale Dilettanti, Borgosesia reached the prime of its history, with the first promotion in Serie C2. However, played only one year after losing the play out with Pro Patria.

In the season 2011–2012 in Serie D Group B was finished in 6th place.

In the 2020–21 Serie D, they were relegated, along with F.C. Vado, but were both readmitted the next season to fill in vacant slots in the league. In the 2023-24 season, Borgosesia finished last in their group and were relegated to the Eccellenza.

== Colors and badge ==
The team's colors are all-dark red.
