= Pro Sulmona Calcio 1921 =

Italian football club

Sulmona
- Full name: Associazione Sportiva Dilettantistica Sulmona Calcio 1921
- Nickname(s): Biancorossi (White-reds); Ovidiani
- Founded: 1921; 2011 (refounded)
- Ground: Francesco Pallozzi, Sulmona, Italy
- Capacity: 1,411
- Chairman: Maurizio Scelli
- Manager: Antonio Mecomonaco
- League: Promozione Abruzzo
- 2015–16: Promozione Abruzzo, 4th
Home colours	Away colours

Associazione Sportiva Dilettantistica Sulmona Calcio 1921 is an Italian association football club, based in Sulmona, Abruzzo.

The club is currently disbanded; this follows a previous dissolution in 2008 and subsequent reformations in both 2011 and 2015. The club last competed in 2015–16, finished fourth in the Promozione Abruzzo, the seventh division of Italian football.

== History ==
=== Foundation ===
The club was founded in 1921, its sporting history characterized by continuous movement between regional championships, national amateurs championships and semiprofessionals.

=== The return in Serie D and the decline ===
In the 2013–2014 season, after winning the Eccellenza Abruzzo, the club returned to Serie D after 18 years. Unfortunately, the club was immediately relegated back to the Eccellenza Abruzzo after losing the relegation play-off. After another failed campaign, finishing bottom of the Eccellenza Abruzzo, they were relegated to the Promozione.

=== Promozione and re-foundation ===
In the summer of 2015, as a result of the continuing problems associated with past debts and previous mismanagement, the club merged with A.S.D. Circle (enrolled in Abruzzo Promotion) and Real Sulmona (youth sector in the area) that give birth to Pro Sulmona Calcio 1921. However, the club soon renounced its place in the Promozione Abruzzo 2016-17 and were directly replaced by A.S.D. Sulmonese Ofena; a new club born of a merger between Real Ofena and a local youth team from Sulmona.

== Colors and badge ==
The team's colors are white and red.
