= SSD Calcio Marano =

Italian football club

Calcio Marano
- Full name: Società Sportiva Dilettantistica Calcio Marano s.r.l.
- Founded: 1951
- Dissolved: 2014
- Ground: Pietro Berto, Marano Vicentino, Italy
- Capacity: 2,000
- 2013–14: Serie D/C, 2nd
Home colours

Società Sportiva Dilettantistica Calcio Marano was an Italian football club based in Marano Vicentino, Veneto. It played in Italy's Serie D.

== History ==
=== Foundation ===
The club was founded in 1951 as U.S. Juventina. In 1962 it changed its name to the last one.

In the season 2012–13 the team was promoted for the first time, from Eccellenza Veneto/A to Serie D.

=== F.C.D. Altovicentino ===
In the summer of 2014 it was merged with A.C.D. Trissino-Valdagno to form F.C.D. Altovicentino.

== Colors and badge ==
The team's colors were white and black.

== Honours ==
- Eccellenza:
  - Winner (1): 2012–13
