= ASD Nuova Santa Maria delle Mole Marino =

Italian football club

Santa Maria Mole Marino
- Full name: Associazione Sportiva Dilettantistica Nuova Santa Maria delle Mole Marino
- Founded: 1978
- Ground: Stadio Comunale Domenico Fiore, Marino, Italy
- Capacity: 3,000
- Chairman: (Italy) Armando De Simone
- Manager: (Italy) Mario Chirico
- League: Serie D/G
- 2012–13: Eccellenza Lazio/Α, 1st (promoted)
| Home colours | Away colours |

A.S.D. Nuova Santa Maria delle Mole Marino (formerly A.S.D. Nuova Santa Maria delle Mole) is an Italian football club based in Marino, Lazio. Currently, it plays in Italy's Serie D. In this team had played the Italian rapper Il Tre.

== History ==
=== Foundation ===
The club was founded in 1978.

=== Serie D ===
In the season 2012–13 the team was promoted for the first time from Eccellenza Lazio/A to Serie D and changed denomination to the current one.

== Colors and badge ==
The team's color are light blue and white.

== Stadium ==
It plays at the Stadio Comunale Domenico Fiore, in Marino, Italy with capacity of 3,000 places.
