= AC Carpi =

Association football club in Italy

A.C. Carpi
- Full name: Associazione Calcio Carpi S.r.l.
- Nickname: I Biancorossi (The White-and-Reds)
- Founded: 1909; 117 years ago 2000; 26 years ago 2021; 5 years ago
- Ground: Stadio Sandro Cabassi
- Capacity: 5,500
- Chairman: Claudio Lazzaretti
- Manager: Stefano Cassani
- League: Serie C Group A
- 2025–26: Serie C Group B, 13th of 20
- Website: www.carpicalcio.it
Home colours	Away colours	Third colours

Associazione Calcio Carpi is an Italian professional football club based in Carpi, a city in the province of Modena. The club was founded in 1909, re-founded in 2000 and 2022.

Carpi's colours are white and red, hence the nickname "Biancorossi". At the end of the 2012–13 season, Carpi won their first promotion to Serie B. On 28 April 2015, the Biancorossi won their first promotion to Serie A, but were relegated back to Serie B after only one season. The Golden Era ended in 2019, with the relegation back in Serie C after five seasons in Serie B and one season in Serie A.

The Biancorossi have won a handful of league titles, including: the old Lega Pro Seconda Divisione; Serie B once; Serie C once; and Serie D four times. At the regional level, Carpi has won Promozione, Prima Divisione, and two Prima Categoria titles.

== History ==
=== A.C. Carpi (1909–2000) ===
The club was founded in the summer of 1909 by local student Adolfo Fanconi as Jucunditas (Latin for "gaiety"), and changed their denomination to Associazione Calcio Carpi a few years later. Carpi played three seasons in the Italian Football Championship, the precursor to Serie A, from the 1919–20 season until 1921–22. Starting from the 1930s, they mostly played between Serie C and Serie D. Carpi achieved their best result in 1997, a third-placed finish under coach Luigi De Canio which allowed them to play the Serie B promotion playoffs then lost to Monza. The club was cancelled in 2000 following relegation to Serie D and subsequent bankruptcy.

=== Carpi F.C. 1909 (2000–2021) ===
A new club, named Calcio Carpi, was therefore admitted to Eccellenza Emilia–Romagna. The club assumed the current denomination in 2002, following promotion to Serie D and a merger with the second team of the city, Dorando Pietri Carpi, that had just reached Serie D as well. Pietri Carpi also sold its license to Boca.

At the end of the 2009–10 season, through repechage due to the number of teams with financial difficulties, the club was admitted into Lega Pro Seconda Divisione. In 2010–11, the club's first season in the higher division, it was promoted again to Lega Pro Prima Divisione. Because of the work being done on their stadium, the Sandro Cabasisi, the team played in the Mapei Stadium – Città del Tricolore in the 2011–12 season.

==== Serie B (2013) ====
In the season 2012–13 the team was promoted from Lega Pro Prima Divisione to Serie B for the first time when they defeated Lecce in the Girone A Play-off Final 2–1 on aggregate. This was the club's third promotion in just four seasons.

Carpi FC's first fixture at Serie B level ended in a 1–0 defeat away to Ternana on 24 August 2013. Their first win was a 2–0 victory at Spezia courtesy of goals from Fabio Concas & Roberto Inglese. Carpi's first season in Serie B ended in a 12th-place finish, only three points away from a promotion play-off place, ensuring their place for another season.

==== Serie A debut promotion (2015) ====
The 2014–15 Serie B campaign saw Carpi, managed by experienced coach Fabrizio Castori, completing the first half of the season (21 games) in a first place, with a record of 43 points and a nine-point advantage over second-placed Frosinone. On 28 April 2015, after a goalless draw with Bari, the club was promoted for the first time to Serie A.

Carpi's first season saw a complete overhaul of the squad from the season previous due to the departure of long-time director of football Cristiano Giuntoli, who had masterminded the club's rise from the amateur Serie D to the top flight, to Napoli. He was subsequently replaced by Sean Sogliano.

On 28 September 2015, after a 1–5 loss to Roma, the club announced it had relieved Castori of his coaching duties with immediate effect, replacing him with Giuseppe Sannino in the first managerial change of the 2015–16 Serie A season. Carpi had achieved just two points from its opening six matches. On 3 November, the club performed a U-turn, and Castori was rehired. The club's debut top-flight season ultimately ended in relegation by a single point, with the club having found itself in a relegation dogfight from virtually the start of the season.

The following season saw another complete reconstruction of the first-team, with several important players returning to their parent clubs from loan, as Carpi sought an immediate return to Serie A. However, they fell to Benevento in the playoff final.

==== Decline and Bankruptcy (2017–2021) ====
In the 2017–18 Serie B season, Carpi placed 11th, but the following season was marred by difficulties that caused the team's relegation to Serie C after six years, after having placed last with just 29 points.

The 2019–20 Serie C season started well for Carpi, which placed second in its group before the COVID-19 pandemic halted the season. Carpi then went to the playoffs, but lost to Novara in the quarter finals.

The following season saw Carpi placing 15th in its group, narrowly avoiding relegation.

However, in July 2021, the COVISOC rejected the club's admission to the 2021–22 Serie C, citing unpaid taxes and contributions between 2020 and 2021. The club was successively excluded entirely from Italian football.

=== Athletic Carpi / A.C. Carpi (2021–current) ===
In 2021, following the disbandment of the original Carpi, a new but distinct club named Athletic Carpi played in the 2021–22 Serie D season. On 13 September 2022, the club, renamed A.C. Carpi, eventually acquired all the naming and historical rights of the original one, thus formally becoming the direct heir of Carpi FC 1909.

== Honours ==
=== Domestic ===
==== Leagues ====
- Serie B

- Winners (1): 2014–15

- Seconda Divisione

- Winners (1): 1922–23

- Serie C

- Winners (1): 1945–46

- Lega Pro Seconda Divisione/Girone A
  - Champions (1): 2010–11
- Serie D

- Winners (3): 1963–64, 1973–74, 1977–78

==== Cups ====
- Coppa Italia Lega Pro
  - Runners up (1): 2010–11
- Supercoppa di Lega di Seconda Divisione
  - Runners up (1): 2010–11

==== Regional ====
- Promozione
  - Winners (1): 1914–15
- Prima Divisione
  - Winners (1): 1949–50
- Prima Categoria
  - Winners (2): 1960–61, 1961–62

=== Youth ===
- Campionato Nazionale Dante Berretti
  - Serie C Winners (1): 1990–91

== Club records ==
=== League ===
Level	Category	Participation	Debut	Final season	Total
1°	Prima Categoria	3	1919–20	1921–22	4
1°	Serie A	1	2015–16		4
2°	Seconda Divisione	4	1922–23	1925–26	8
2°	Prima Divisione	2	1926–27	1927–28	8
2°	Serie B	2	2013–14	2014–15	8
3°	Prima Divisione	7	1928–29	1934–35	32
3°	Serie C	13	1936–37	1974–75	32
3°	Serie C1	10	1989–90	1998–99	32
3°	Lega Pro Prima Divisione	2	2011–12	2012–13	32
4°	Promozione	2	1950–51	1951–52	26
4°	IV Serie	5	1952–53	1958–59	26
4°	Campionato Interregionale – Seconda Categoria	1	1957–58		26
4°	Campionato Interregionale	1	1958–59		26
4°	Serie D	13	1962–63	1977–78	26
4°	Serie C2	3	1978–79	1999–00	26
4°	Lega Pro Seconda Divisione	1	2010–11		26
5°	Campionato Interregionale	7	1981–82	1987–88	16
5°	Serie D	9	1980–81	2009–10	16

In 81 football seasons starting from the onset at the national level in the Northern League in 1922:

Regional

Level	Category	Participation	Debut	Final season	Total
I	Promozione	2	1913–14	1914–15	9
I	Prima Divisione	3	1935–36	1949–50	9
I	Prima Categoria	3	1959–60	1961–62	9
I	Eccellenza	2	2000–01	2001–02	9

In 12 seasons starting from the onset at the regional level in Promozione in 1914:

=== Individual ===
Record of appearances

- 329 (Italy) Claudio Pressich
- 282 (Italy) Aurelio Dotti
- 254 (Italy) Giancarlo Magnani
- 243 (Italy) Simone Teocoli
- 239 (Italy) Giuseppe Pantaleoni
- 232 (Italy) Carlo Forghieri
- 226 (Italy) Luigi Silvestri
- 224 (Italy) Vittorio Soliani
- 220 (Italy) Archimede Pellizzola
- 217 (Italy) Raffaello Papone

Record of goals

- 78 (Italy) Gianfranco Poletto
- 78 (Italy) Giorgio Vernizzi
- 76 (Italy) Armando Onesti
- 57 (Italy) Alberto Bonaretti
- 50 (Italy) Enrico Gherardi
- 40 (Italy) Marco Gibertini
- 36 (Italy) Mauro Sberveglieri
- 34 (Italy) Armando Aguzzoli
- 33 (Italy) Ennio Bergonzini
- 33 (Italy) Stefano Roncarati

== Current squad ==
As of 1 September 2026

Note: Flags indicate national team as defined under FIFA eligibility rules; some limited exceptions apply. Players may hold more than one non-FIFA nationality.

No.	Pos.	Nation	Player
1	GK	ITA	Alessandro Scacchetti
2	DF	ITA	Mattia Maggio
4	DF	ITA	Davide Zagnoni
5	MF	ITA	Matteo Figoli
6	MF	ITA	Andrea Astrologo
7	DF	ITA	Tommaso Cecotti
8	MF	ITA	Niccolò Bagatti
9	MF	ITA	Martin Montipò
10	MF	ITA	Federico Casarini
11	MF	ITA	Filippo Puletto
12	GK	ITA	Alex Perta
14	MF	ITA	Leonardo Zarpellon
16	DF	ITA	Luca Nesi (on loan from Bologna)

No.	Pos.	Nation	Player
17	DF	ITA	Lorenzo Lombardi
18	FW	ITA	Tommaso Carcani
19	DF	ITA	Matteo Rossini
21	MF	ITA	Marco Forapani
22	GK	ITA	Tito Gasperini
23	MF	ITA	Leonardo Morosini
24	DF	ITA	Fabio Desole
25	DF	ITA	Giovanni Vaglica (on loan from Giugliano)
44	DF	ITA	Riccardo Gatti
83	FW	SEN	Abdoulaye Sall
90	FW	ITA	Vincenzo Vitale
95	DF	ITA	Rodrick Tcheuna

== Notable former managers ==
- (Hungary) József Zilisy (1942–43)
- (Italy) Gianni De Biasi (1993–96)
- (Italy) Luigi De Canio (1996–97)
- (Italy) Walter De Vecchi (1997–98)
- (Italy) Egidio Notaristefano (2011–12)
- (Italy) Giuseppe Pillon (2014)
- (Italy) Fabrizio Castori (2014–15)
- (Italy) Giuseppe Sannino (2015)
- (Italy) Fabrizio Castori (2015–17)
