= FCD Altovicentino =

Italian football club

Altovicentino
- Full name: Football Club Dilettantistico Altovicentino
- Founded: 2014
- Dissolved: 2017
- Ground: Stadio dei Fiori, Valdagno, Italy
- Capacity: 5,000
- 2016–17: Serie D/C, 12th (relegated after being declared bankrupt)
Home colours	Away colours	Third colours

Football Club Dilettantistico Altovicentino was an Italian football club based in Marano Vicentino and Valdagno, Veneto.

== History ==
=== Foundation ===
The club was founded in 2014 after the merger between the clubs of Serie D: S.S.D. Calcio Marano and A.C.D. Trissino-Valdagno.

== Colors and badge ==
The team's colors are red, light blue white and black.
