= ASD Chiavari Calcio Caperana =

Italian football club

Chiavari Caperana
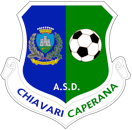
- Full name: Associazione Sportiva Dilettantistica Chiavari Calcio Caperana
- Founded: 1972 (as Caperanese)
- Dissolved: 2014
- Ground: Stadio Angelo Daneri, Chiavari, Italy
- Chairman: (Italy) Giorgio Rattotti
- Manager: (Italy) Luca Piropi
- League: Prima categoria Liguria
- 2013–14: Serie D/A, 8th
Home colours	Away colours	Third colours

A.S.D. Chiavari Calcio Caperana was an Italian association football club, based in Caperana, a frazione of Chiavari, Liguria.

Chiavari Caperana last played in Serie D.

== History ==
The club was founded in 1972 as A.S.D. Caperanese. The team was promoted to Eccellenza Liguria in the 2000–01 season after an ascent started in Seconda Categoria in the 1998–99 season.

In the 2009–10 season Caperanese won the national play-offs of Eccellenza Liguria and so was promoted in Serie D.

In summer 2010 the club was renamed A.S.D. Chiavari Calcio Caperana. At the end of the 2013–14 Serie D season it was not admitted to the next edition and folded thereafter. From May 2015 the club has been refounded as A. S. D. Caperanese 2015 and plays in the first category league L. N. D. Liguria

== Colors and badge ==
The team's colors are green and blue, such as the municipality.
