= ASD Jolly Montemurlo =

Italian football club

Jolly Montemurlo
- Full name: Associazione Sportiva Dilettantistica Jolly Montemurlo
- Founded: 1965
- Ground: Aldo Nelli, Montemurlo, Italy
- Capacity: 400
- Chairman: (Italy) Nesi Gabriele
- League: Serie D/E
- 2012–13: Eccellenza Tuscany/A, 1st (promoted)
Home colours	Away colours

A.S.D. Jolly Montemurlo is an Italian football club based in Montemurlo, Tuscany. Currently it plays in Italy's Serie D.

== History ==
=== Foundation ===
The club was founded in 1965.

=== Serie D ===
In the season 2012–13, the team was promoted for the first time, from Eccellenza Tuscany/A to Serie D.

== Colours and badge ==
The team's colour is black.

== Honours ==
- Eccellenza:
  - Winner (1): 2012–13
