= USD Dro Alto Garda Calcio =

Italian football club

Dro Alto Garda
- Full name: Unione Sportiva Dilettantistica Dro Alto Garda Calcio
- Nicknames: Gialloverdi (the green and yellows)
- Founded: 1950
- Ground: Comunale, Dro, Italy & Comunale, Arco, Trentino
- Capacity: 500 & 1,200
- Chairman: Loris Angeli
- Manager: Stefano Manfioletti
- League: Serie D/C
- 2018–19: Eccellenza Trentino-Alto Adige, 1st (promoted)
Home colours	Away colours

Unione Sportiva Dilettantistica Dro Alto Garda Calcio is an Italian football club based in Dro, Trentino-Alto Adige. It currently plays in Italy's Serie D.

== History ==
=== Serie D ===
The club was founded in 1950 as Unione Sportiva Dro; in 2017 it switched to Dro Alto Garda to propose itself as the main team for the territory around the north end of Garda Lake.

In the season 2012–13 the team was promoted for the first time, from Eccellenza Trentino-Alto Adige to Serie D.

== Colors and badge ==
The team's color are yellow and green; blue is also used in the away kits.

== Honours ==
- Eccellenza:
  - Winner (1): 2012–13
