= Stadio dei Fiori =

Stadium in Valdagno, Italy

Coordinates: 45.6489°N 11.3043°E

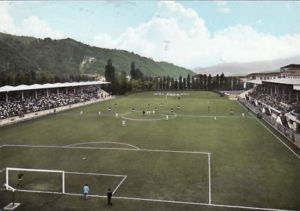
- Interactive map of Stadio dei Fiori
- Location: Valdagno, Italy
- Owner: Valdagno
- Capacity: 6,500

Tenant
- Trissino-Valdagno

Stadio dei Fiori, is a multi-purpose stadium in Valdagno, Italy. It is used mostly for football matches and hosts the home matches of Trissino-Valdagno in Serie D. The stadium has a capacity of 6,500 spectators and meets Lega Pro criteria.
