= Copa Italia =

Copa Italia was a competition for association football clubs of Paraguay in 1920 won by Club Libertad from the capital Asunción. Prize was a highly attractive trophy donated by the ambassador of Italy.

Club Libertad reached the final defeating Club River Plate, Club Guaraní and Club Nacional. Finalist was Club Sol de América, which defeated Club Cerro Porteño and Club Olimpia on its path. Libertad won the final with 2–0 over Sol de América with two goals by their striker Segundo Ibarra.

Libertad also won the national championship of 1920. Sol de América, joint fifth in the national league, would go on to win the less valued Copa Manila with a 16–0 win over Atlético Marte of Luque.
