= AS Sancolombano Calcio =

Italian football club

Sancolombano
- Full name: Associazione Sportiva Sancolombano Calcio
- Founded: 1970
- Ground: Franco Riccardi, San Colombano al Lambro, Italy
- Capacity: 2,000
- Chairman: (Italy) Bianchi Battista
- Manager: (Italy) Umberto Cortelazzi
- League: Serie D/D
- 2012–13: Eccellenza Lombardy/B, 2nd (promoted)
Home colours	Away colours

A.S. Sancolombano Calcio is an Italian football club based in San Colombano al Lambro, Lombardy. Currently it plays in Italy's Serie D.

== History ==
=== Foundation ===
The club was founded in 1970.

=== Serie D ===
In the season 2012–13 the team was promoted from Eccellenza Lombardy/B to Serie D.

== Colors and badge ==
The team's color is red.
