= US Inveruno =

Italian football club

Inveruno
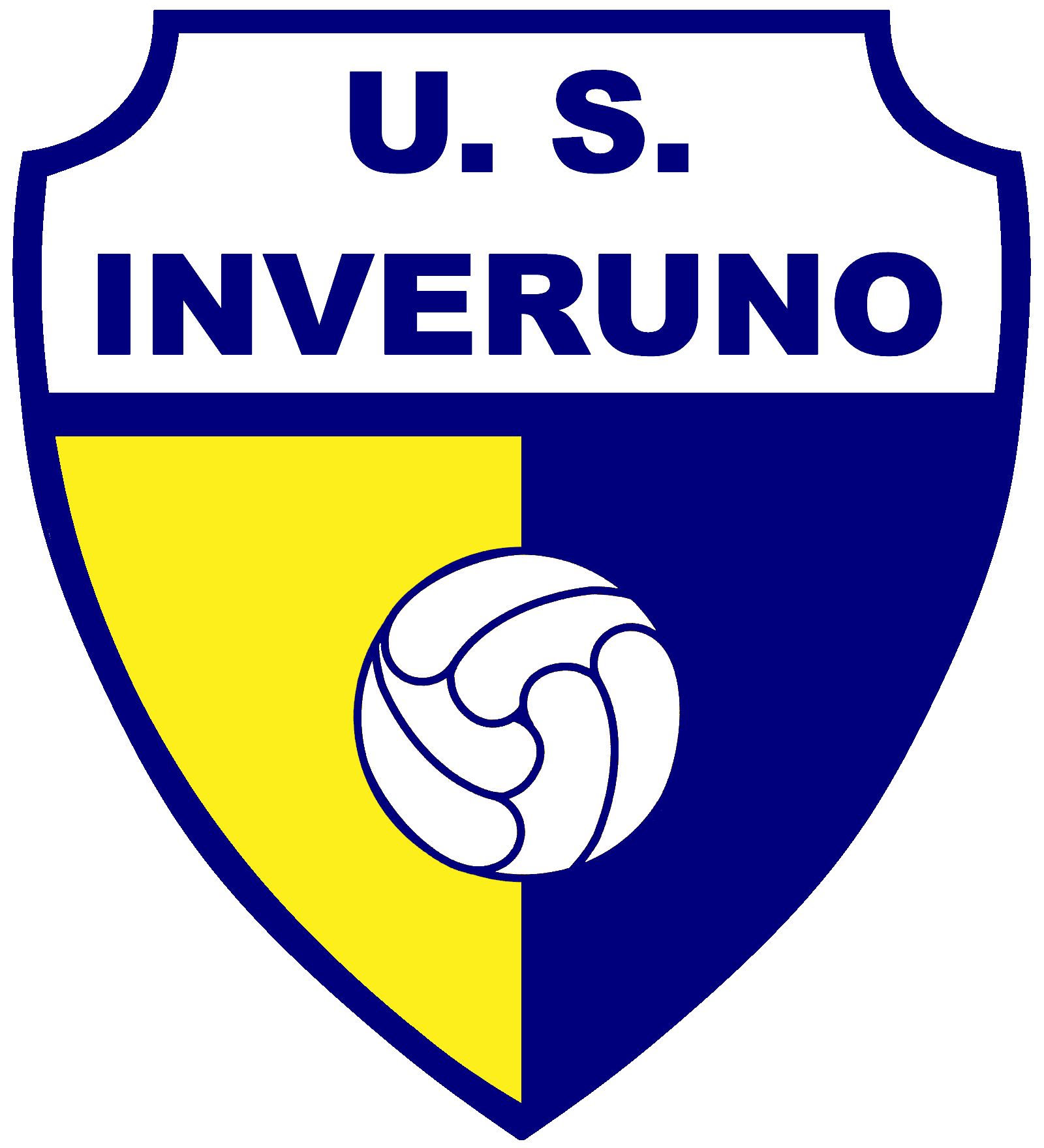
- Full name: Unione Sportiva Inveruno
- Nickname(s): Il Gialloblù (The Yellow & Blue); Invrugn ('Inveruno' in Lombard)
- Founded: 1945
- Ground: Stadio Comunale Luigino Garavaglia, Inveruno, Italy
- Capacity: 2500
- Chairman: (Italy) Silvano Garavaglia
- Manager: (Italy) Matteo Andreoletti
- League: Serie D/A
- 2017–18: 7th
Home colours	Away colours

Unione Sportiva Inveruno is an Italian football club based in Inveruno, Lombardy. Currently it plays in Italy's Serie D.

== History ==
=== Foundation ===
The club was founded in 1945.

=== Serie D ===
In the season 2012–13 the team was promoted after 50 years, from Eccellenza Lombardy/A to Serie D.

== Colors and badge ==
The team's colors are yellow and blue.

== Honours ==
- Eccellenza:
  - Winner (1): 2012–13
