= USD San Severo =

Italian football club

San Severo
- Full name: Unione Sportiva Dilettantistica San Severo
- Founded: 1922
- Ground: Ricciardelli, San Severo, Italy
- Capacity: 1,200
- Chairman: (Italy) Matteo Fontanello
- Manager: (Italy) Danilo Rufini
- League: campionato Promozione Puglia
- 2012–13: Eccellenza Apulia, 1st (promoted)
Home colours

Unione Sportiva Dilettantistica San Severo is an Italian association football club based in San Severo, Apulia. The club currently plays in Promozione Puglia, sixth division of the Italian championship.

== History ==
=== Foundation ===
The club was founded in 1922.

=== Serie D ===
In the season 2012–13 the team was promoted for the second time, from Eccellenza Apulia to Serie D.

== Colours and badge ==
The team's colours are red and yellow.

== Honours ==
- Eccellenza:
  - Winner (2): 1993–1994 and 2012–13
