= Terracina Calcio 1925 =

Italian football club

Terracina
- Full name: Terracina Calcio
- Founded: 1925
- Ground: Mario Colavolpe, Terracina, Italy
- Capacity: 4,000
- Chairman: (Italy) Luciano Iannotta
- League: Promozione Lazio
- 2016-17: 4th
Home colours	Away colours

Terracina Calcio 1925 is an Italian football club based in Terracina, Lazio. As of 2013 it plays in Italy's Serie D.

== History ==
=== Foundation ===
The club was founded in 1925.

=== Serie D ===
In the season 2012–13 the team was promoted from Eccellenza Lazio/B to Serie D after nine years of absence.

== Colors and badge ==
The team's colors are light blue and white.
