= ACD Pro Dronero =

Italian football club

Pro Dronero
- Full name: Associazione Calcio Dilettantistica Pro Dronero
- Founded: 1913; 112 years ago
- Ground: Comunale, Dronero, Italy
- Capacity: 1,000
- Chairman: (Italy) Beccacini Corrado
- Manager: (Italy) Antonio Caridi
- League: Serie D/A
- 2017–18: Eccellenza Piedmont/B, 1st (promoted)
Home colours

A.C.D. Pro Dronero is an Italian football club based in Dronero, Piedmont. Currently it plays in Italy's Serie D, the fourth-tier league.

== History ==
=== Foundation ===
The club was founded in 1913.

=== Serie D ===
In the season 2012–13 the team was promoted for the first time, from Eccellenza Piedmont to Serie D.

== Colors and badge ==
The team's color is red.

== Honours ==
- Eccellenza:
  - Play-off (1): 2012-13
  - Winner (1): 2017-18
