= FC Atletico Montichiari =

Italian football club

Atletico Montichiari
- Full name: Football Club Atletico Montichiari
- Founded: 2012
- Ground: Stadio Romeo Menti, Montichiari, Italy
- Capacity: 2,500
- Chairman: Maurizio Viola
- Manager: Marco Torresani
- League: Eccellenza Lombardy
- 2014–15: Serie D/B, 19th (relegated)
Home colours	Away colours

F.C. Atletico Montichiari is an Italian association football club, based in Montichiari, Lombardy. It currently plays in Serie D.

== History ==
F.C. Atletico Montichiari was formed in 2012 by bought the sports title from A.C. Carpenedolo, in order to replace defunct team of the city, A.C. Montichiari folded in the same year.

Both Montichiari, Carpenedolo were the town from the Province of Brescia, thus the relocation was allowed by Norme organizzative interne of Italian Football Federation.

== Colors and badge ==
The team's colors are red and blue.
