= ASD Real Metapontino =

Italian football club

Real Metapontino
- Full name: Associazione Sportiva Dilettantistica Real Metapontino
- Founded: 2011
- Ground: Puccio Dellorusso, Montalbano Jonico, Italy
- Capacity: 2.000
- Chairman: (Italy) Casalnuovo Pasquale
- Manager: (Italy) Logarzo Pasquale
- League: Serie D/H
- 2012–13: Eccellenza Basilicata, 1st (promoted)
Home colours

A.S.D. Real Metapontino is an Italian football club based in Montalbano Jonico, Basilicata. Corrente it plays in Italy's Promozione.

== History ==
=== Foundation ===
The club was founded in 2011.

=== Serie D ===
In the season 2012–13 the team was promoted for the first time, from Eccellenza Basilicata to Serie D.

== Colors and badge ==
The team's colors are lightblue and blue.

== Honours ==
- Eccellenza:
  - Winner (1): 2012–13
