= ASD Thermal Teolo =

Italian football club

- Full name: A.S.D. Thermal Calcio Abano (2005–2011); A.S.D. Thermal Abano Teolo (2011–2015); A.S.D. Thermal Teolo (2015–2019); Academy Thermal Teolo (2019–2020); Academy Abano Teolo (2020–2024); Thermal Teolo (2024–)
- Founded: 2005
- Ground: Centro Sportivo Euganeo; Teolo, Italy
- League: Seconda Categoria

Thermal Teolo is an Italian football club based in Teolo, Veneto. Since the season 2019–2020 to 2022–2023, deals only with the youth sector. Currently playing in Seconda Categoria.

== History ==
=== Thermal Abano and Teolo ===
The club was founded in 2005 as Thermal Abano in Abano Terme. In 2011 it was renamed Thermal Abano Teolo after the merger with C.S.R.Teolo.

=== Serie D ===
In the season 2012–13 the team was promoted for the first time, from Eccellenza Veneto/A to Serie D/D. At the end of the 2014–15 season in Serie D/D, they were relegated to Eccellenza.

=== Thermal Teolo and Academy Thermal Teolo ===
Academy Thermal Teolo logo.

In 2015 it was renamed Thermal Teolo after the departure from the city of Abano Terme. At the end of the 2016–17 season in Eccellenza, they were relegated to Promozione. In the 2017/18 season Thermal Teolo has participated in Promozione. Unfortunately it only achieved the last position, and was relegated to Prima Categoria.

Since the season 2019–2020, deals only with the youth sector.

=== Academy Abano Teolo ===
Academy Abano Teolo logo.

On 25 May 2020, the Academy Thermal Teolo and Abano Calcio join forces to create a new company, dedicated only to the youth sector.

In 2021, the team's San Giuseppe Abano and Polisportiva Bresseo Treponti, join the project.

=== Thermal Teolo ===
In the summer of 2024, it merges with the company GSD Unione Terassa Padovana, changes its name to Thermal Teolo and lands in Seconda Categoria.
