= ASD Orlandina Calcio =

Italian football club

Orlandina
- Full name: Associazione Sportiva Dilettantistica; Orlandina Calcio
- Founded: 1951
- Ground: Ciccino Micale, Capo d'Orlando, Sicily
- Capacity: 2,500
- Chairman: (Italy) Massimo Romagnoli
- Manager: (Italy) Giuseppe Laurà
- League: Prima Categoria Sicily/B
- Prima Categoria Sicily: Prima Categoria Sicily/c, 8th (as Pro Orlandina)
Home colours

A.S.D. Orlandina Calcio is an Italian football club based in Capo d'Orlando, Sicily. Currently it plays in the amateur Prima Categoria league.

== History ==
=== Foundation ===
The club was founded in 1951.

=== Serie D ===
In the season 2012–13 the team was promoted for the first time, from Eccellenza Sicily/B to Serie D. The club disbanded after that lone season, and restarted from Prima Categoria afterwards.

== Colors and badge ==
The team's colors are blue and white.
