= A.S.D. Due Torri =

Due Torri
- Full name: Associazione Sportiva Dilettantistica Due Torri
- Founded: 1973
- Ground: Enzo Vasi Municipal Stadium; Piraino, Sicily
- Capacity: 3,800
- Manager: Nino Foti Cuzzola
- League: Promozione
- 2019-20: Promozione Sicilia / B
Home colours

A.S.D. Due Torri is a soccer club based in Piraino, Sicily, Italy. It currently plays in Italy in Promozione.

== History ==
=== Founding ===
The club was founded in 1973.

=== Serie D ===
During the 2012–13 season, the team was promoted for the first time, from Eccellenza Sicilia / B to Serie D, to fill vacant positions that had been created.

The club was expelled from the Italian Football Federation in January 2017 after failing to show up for four consecutive games in the 2016–17 Serie D.

A phoenix club was successively formed and admitted to the amateur regional Prima Categoria league.

== Colors ==
The team's color is red.
