= ACD Union Ripa La Fenadora =

Italian football club

Union Fenadora
- Full name: Associazione Calcio Dilettantistica Union Ripa La Fenadora
- Founded: 2008
- Dissolved: 2016
- Ground: Stadio Comunale di Seren del Grappa, Seren del Grappa, Italy
- Capacity: 500
- 2015–16: Serie D/C, 13th

Associazione Calcio Dilettantistica Union Ripa La Fenadora was an Italian football club based in Seren del Grappa, Veneto.

== History ==
=== Foundation ===
Ripa La Fenadora was founded in July 2008, after the merger between the A.C. Seren La Fenadora and A.C.D. Ripa 2000. The new company registered in the Eccellenza championship.

=== Serie D ===
In the season 2012–13 the team was promoted for the first time from Eccellenza Veneto to Serie D to fill the vacancies created.

=== Dissolved ===
The May 1, 2016 the Union Ripa Fenadora merges with Feltreseprealpi, creating the new club A.S.D. Union Feltre.

== Colors and badge ==
The team's colors are black and green.
