= Teolo =

Teolo Teóło
- Comune
- Comune di Teolo
- Location within Italy Location within Veneto
- Coordinates: 45°21′N 11°40′E
- Country: Italy
- Region: Veneto
- Province: Padua (PD)
- Frazioni: Bresseo, Castelnuovo, Feriole, Praglia, San Biagio, Tramonte, Treponti (municipality seat), Villa

Government
  - Mayor: Moreno Valdisolo

Area
  - Total: 31.1 km^{2} (12.0 sq mi)
- Elevation: 16 m (52 ft)

Population (2008)
  - Total: 8,779
  - Density: 282/km^{2} (731/sq mi)
- Demonym: Teolesi
- Time zone: UTC+1 (CET)
  - Summer (DST): UTC+2 (CEST)
- Postal code: 35037
- Dialing code: 049
- Website: Official website

Teolo (Venetian: Teóło) is a comune (municipality) in the Province of Padua in the Italian region Veneto, located about 50 kilometres (31 mi) west of Venice and about 15 kilometres (9 mi) southwest of Padua.

The municipality of Teolo is divided into the frazioni of Bresseo, Castelnuovo, Feriole, Praglia, San Biagio, Tramonte, Treponti (which houses the municipal seat) and Villa .
