= SSD Correggese Calcio 1948 =

Italian football club

Correggese
- Full name: Società Sportiva Dilettantistica Correggese Calcio 1948
- Nicknames: Biancorossi (The White and reds), Tigrotti (The Tigers)
- Founded: 1948; 78 years ago
- Ground: Walter Borelli
- Capacity: 1,500
- Chairman: Claudio Lazzaretti
- Manager: Gabriele Graziani
- League: Serie D
- 2025–26: Serie D/D, 12th
- Website: www.correggese.it
Home colours	Away colours

Società Sportiva Dilettantistica Correggese Calcio 1948, commonly referred to as S.S.D. Correggese or Correggese is an Italian football club founded in 1948 and based in Correggio, Emilia-Romagna, that plays in Serie D.

== History ==
=== Foundation ===
The club was founded in 1948.

=== Serie D ===
In the 2012–13 season the team was promoted for the first time, from Eccellenza Emilia-Romagna/A to Serie D thanks to the repechage. In the 2013–14 season the team won the promotion playoffs of Serie D, however the team remained for 2014–15 Serie D for another season, due to the winner did not automatically grant a promotion. In the 2017-18 season the club was relegated in Eccellenza, but in 2019 it reached the first place and was promoted to Serie D.

== Colors and badge ==
The team's colors are red and white.

== Presidential history ==
- ... (1948-?)
- Gianluca Catelani (?-2010)
- Claudio Lazzaretti (2010-)

== Managerial history ==
- ... (1948-2009)
- Enrico Zanasi (2009-2011)
- Maurizio Galantini, Davide Belletti (2011-2012)
- Francesco Salmi (2012-2013)
- Massimo Bagatti (2013-2015)
- Giacomo Lazzini, Nicola Campedelli, Eugenio Benuzzi (2015-2016)
- Massimo Bagatti, Eugenio Benuzzi (2016-2017)
- Salvatore Marra, Gabriele Graziani, Salvatore Marra, Cristiano Masitto (2017-2018)
- Cristian Serpini (2018-)

== Honours ==
- Eccellenza: 1

2018-19 (girone A)

- Promozione: 2

1990-91 (girone C), 2009-10 (girone B)

- Supercoppa Emilia Romagna: 1

2018-19
