= Marano Vicentino =

- Comune
- Comune di Marano Vicentino
- Location within Italy Location within Veneto
- Coordinates: 45°42′N 11°26′E
- Country: Italy
- Region: Veneto
- Province: Vicenza (VI)
- Frazioni: Malo, San Vito di Leguzzano, Schio, Thiene, Zanè

Area
  - Total: 12 km^{2} (4.6 sq mi)
- Elevation: 136 m (446 ft)

Population (31 August 2008)
  - Total: 9,622
  - Density: 800/km^{2} (2,100/sq mi)
- Demonym: Maranesi
- Time zone: UTC+1 (CET)
  - Summer (DST): UTC+2 (CEST)
- Postal code: 36035
- Dialing code: 0445
- ISTAT code: 024056
- Patron saint: Annunciazione Maria Vergine
- Saint day: Monday after 16 July
- Website: Official website

Marano Vicentino is a town and comune in the province of Vicenza, Veneto, Italy. It is south of Viale Europa.

== Sources ==
- (Google Maps)
