= Serie D =

Italian association football league

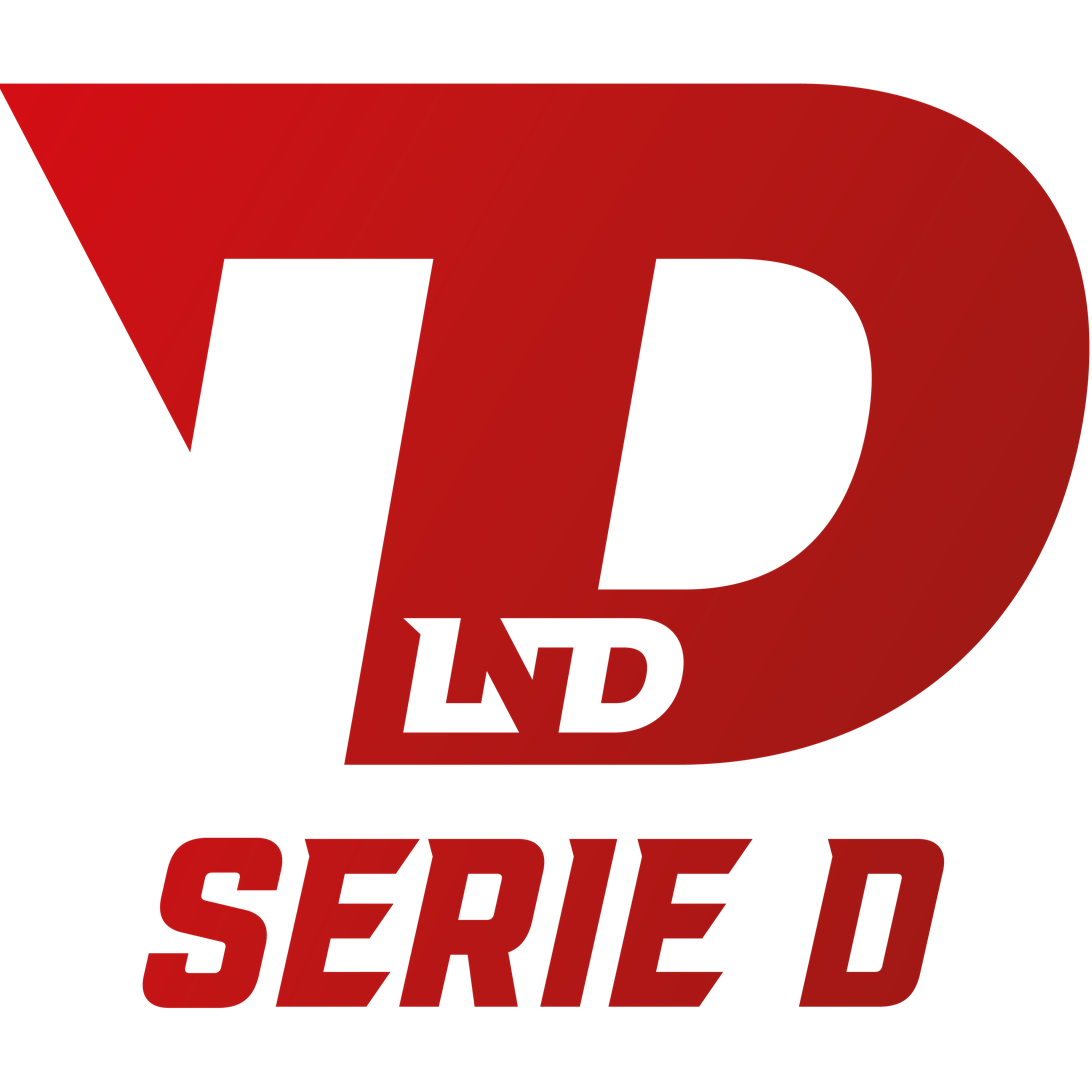
- Organising body: Lega Nazionale Dilettanti
- Founded: 1948 as Promozione; 1992 as Campionato Nazionale Dilettanti
- Country: Italy
- Other club from: San Marino
- Confederation: UEFA
- Leagues: Leghe Interregionali (1948); Lega IV Serie (1952); Lega Semiprofessionisti (1959); Lega Nazionale Dilettanti (1981)
- Divisions: 8
- Number of clubs: 160
- Level on pyramid: 4
- Promotion to: Serie C
- Relegation to: Eccellenza
- Domestic cup: Coppa Italia Dilettanti (until 1999)
- League cup: Coppa Italia Serie D (since 1999)
- Current champions: Livorno (1st title) (2024–25)
- Most championships: Siena (2 titles)
- Website: seried.lnd.it
- Current: 2026–27 Serie D

The Serie D (Italian pronunciation: [ˈsɛːrje (d)ˈdi]) is the highest level of semi-professional football in Italy, and the fourth tier of the Italian national league system, the lowest one with a national organization. It sits beneath the third and lowest fully professional league, Serie C, and feeds in to it through promotion and relegation. Serie D is administered by the Lega Nazionale Dilettanti and is organized by the Roman Comitato Interregionale (Interregional Committee), a "league in the league" inside the LND.

== History ==
In 1948 the three leagues running Division 3 (Serie C) had to be reorganized due to an ever-growing number of regional teams. FIGC decided not to relegate the excess teams to regional championships. It chose the winners and a few runners-up from the 36 Serie C championships to be added to the new third division set up into 4 groups. The rest of the teams joined the new Promozione, which changed its name in 1952 into IV Serie (Fourth Division) and then in 1959 into Serie D.

From 1959 each player in the Serie D championships had to opt for semi-professional status, by signing a specially issued status attribution form. The championship was thus included in the Lega Nazionale Semiprofessionisti, today known as Lega Pro. Serie D was re-organized in 1981 when championships were reduced. The league name changed into the Interregional. Players lost semi-pro status and converted to amateurs. The championship subsequently passed into the Lega Nazionale Dilettanti. From 1992 to 1999 the name changed into Campionato Nazionale Dilettanti before eventually returning to the current Serie D name. With the merger of the Lega Pro's two divisions at the end of the 2013–14 season to reestablish the Serie C, Serie D and the leagues below it moved up by one level in the pyramid system, reducing the number of leagues in Italian football to nine.

== Structure ==
Since the early 1990s, Serie D has consisted of 162 teams split into 9 regional divisions (Gironi), usually formed of 18 teams each, divided geographically.

For the many seasons, there were 166 or a bit different number of teams. Generally, the distribution by region is as follows:

- Girone A – teams from Aosta Valley, Piedmont, Liguria and Lombardy.
- Girone B – teams from Lombardy and Veneto.
- Girone C – teams from Friuli-Venezia Giulia, Trentino-Alto Adige/Südtirol, Veneto and Lombardy.
- Girone D – teams from Emilia-Romagna, Tuscany and Veneto.
- Girone E – teams from Lazio, Tuscany and Umbria.
- Girone F – teams from Abruzzo, Lazio, Marche and Molise.
- Girone G – teams from Lazio and Sardinia.
- Girone H – teams from Apulia, Basilicata and Campania.
- Girone I – teams from Calabria, Campania and Sicily.

== Promotions ==
The first-placed team from each division is promoted to Serie C each year, replacing 9 teams relegated to Serie D.

If a newly promoted Serie D team fails to meet the requirements, Lega Pro asks the second-placed team in that Serie D team's division to fill the vacancy. Failing that, the third-placed team may fill the vacancy, and so on.

In recent years, one or more teams from the professional leagues have normally failed to meet the regulatory or financial requirements in order to participate. This usually creates vacancies that get announced in the summer rest period as the new season is being organized. As teams move up to fill the void created by these failed teams or teams in the lowest professional division fail, spaces are created in Serie C (or Serie C2 prior to the 2014–15 season) that need to be filled.

For example, in the 2007–08 season there were nine such failures, and thus, nine Serie C2 spaces were created. Four of those spaces were filled by calling back teams that had played in Seconda Divisione but were relegated to Serie D for the next season. The other five vacancies were filled by Serie D teams that had participated in the Serie D playoffs.

== Playoffs ==
Playoffs are held at the conclusion of the regular season and involve teams placed second through fifth in each division. The first two rounds are single game elimination matches played at the home of the higher-classified team. Games ending in ties are extended to extra time. Since the 2007–08 season, if games are still tied after extra time, the higher classified team is declared the winner. No penalty shootout takes place.

In round one, for each division, the 5th-placed team is matched against the 2nd-placed team, and the 4th-placed team is matched against the 3rd-placed team. Round two matches together the two winners. At the end of round two, one team from each division survives and the nine winners are grouped into 3 groups of three and play each team in their own group once (one at home and one away). The three group winners qualify for the play-off semi-finals. Since 2007–08, the Coppa Italia Serie D winner qualifies for the 4th semi-final spot. The semi-finals are a two-legged tie, with the winners qualifying for a one-game final match played at a neutral site.

The playoff results provide the league with a list from which it may choose teams to fill vacancies in Serie C. The number of teams promoted through this method can vary each year; for example in 2007–08, the top 5 placed play-off teams were selected to fill vacancies, however, in 2006–07, no teams were needed to fill vacancies.

== Relegations playout ==
After the regular season is complete, bottom teams in each division play a double-leg series (6th-last vs 3rd-last, 5th-last vs 4th-last). The winners remain in Serie D for the following season. The two losers are relegated to Eccellenza, a regional amateur league below this, for a total of 4 relegations in each division, 36 in total for the league.

There are no play-out if the difference between 6th-last vs 3rd-last and that between 5th-last vs 4th-last is bigger than eight points.

== Tie-breakers ==
Serie D does not use head-to-head results to order teams that are tied in points in certain situations, single-game tie-breakers are held at neutral sites instead. Those situations are the following:

- a tie between 1st and 2nd place, where the winner would get a direct promotion to Seconda Divisione and loser qualifies for the play-offs.
- a tie between 7th-last and 6th-last, where the winner avoids participating in the relegation play-out.
- a tie between 3rd-last and 2nd-last, where the winner qualifies for the relegation play-out and the loser is directly relegated.

Head-to-head results are used in all other situations, such as when all the teams involved are qualified in the promotional playoffs, or all teams are participating in the relegation playoffs.

== Scudetto Serie D ==
Each year, at the end of the regular season, the winners of the nine Serie D divisions qualify for a championship tournament in order to assign the so-called Scudetto Serie D (the LND champions' title).

Round one divides the nine teams into three groups of three teams each where each team plays a single game against each of its other two opponents. The three group winners and best second-placed team advance to the semifinals.

Before the creation of Scudetto Serie D in 1952–1953 as semiprofessional championship, three South Italy titles were awarded during the 1948-1952 Promotion championship. The first amateur title was created in 1958 with the first version of Scudetto Dilettanti that lasted until 1962 and was replaced 4 years later by the Coppa Italia Dilettanti. Finally, between 1987-88 and 1991-92 season the Trofeo Jacinto was awarded to the best team of Campionato Interregionale. This additional titles are listed below

=== Serie D Champions ===
- 1952–53 – Catanzaro as Scudetto IV Serie
- 1953–54 – Bari
- 1954–55 – Colleferro
- 1955–56 – Siena
- 1956–57 – Sarom Ravenna
- 1957–58 – Cosenza, Ozo Mantova & Spezia (ex-aequo)
- 1992–93 – Eurobuilding Crevalcore as Scudetto Dilettanti
- 1993–94 – Pro Vercelli
- 1994–95 – Taranto
- 1995–96 – Castel San Pietro (Note: Successively not admitted to Serie C2.)
- 1996–97 – Biellese
- 1997–98 – Giugliano
- 1998–99 – Lanciano
- 1999–2000 – Sangiovannese as Scudetto Serie D
- 2000–01 – Palmese
- 2001–02 – Olbia
- 2002–03 – Cavese
- 2003–04 – Massese
- 2004–05 – Bassano Virtus
- 2005–06 – Paganese
- 2006–07 – Tempio
- 2007–08 – Aversa Normanna
- 2008–09 – Pro Vasto
- 2009–10 – Montichiari
- 2010–11 – Cuneo
- 2011–12 – Venezia
- 2012–13 – Ischia
- 2013–14 – Pordenone
- 2014–15 – Robur Siena
- 2015–16 – Viterbese
- 2016–17 – Monza
- 2017–18 – Pro Patria
- 2018–19 – Avellino
- 2019–20 – Not assigned due to COVID-19 pandemic in Italy
- 2020–21 – Not assigned due to COVID-19 pandemic in Italy
- 2021–22 – Recanatese
- 2022–23 – Sestri Levante
- 2023–24 – Campobasso
- 2024–25 – Livorno
- 2025–26 – Scafatese

=== Dilettanti Champions ===
- 1948–49 – Pomigliano Calcio as Lega Interregional Sud
- 1949–50 – Antonio Toma Maglie
- 1950–51 – Molfetta Sportiva
- 1957–58 – Civitavecchiese as Scudetto Dilettanti
- 1958–59 – Mobilieri Cascina
- 1959–60 – ASD Ponziana
- 1960–61 – ASDC Borgomanero
- 1961–62 – ASD Nocerina 1910
- 1987–88 – ASD Vigor Trani Calcio as Trofeo Jacinto
- 1988–89 – FC Valdagno
- 1989–90 – Enna Calcio SCSD
- 1990–91 – FC Matera
- 1991–92 – ASD OltrepòVoghera

== See also ==
- Italian football league system
