= 2012–13 Delfino Pescara 1936 season =

Delfino Pescara 1936
2012–13 season
- Serie A: 20th (relegated)
- Coppa Italia: Fourth round
- Top goalscorer: League: Vladimír Weiss (4); All: Vladimír Weiss (5)

The 2012–13 Delfino Pescara 1936 season was the 77th season in club history. It was Pescara's first season back in the Serie A since the 1992–93 season and the sixth overall in the top-flight in the club's history.

== Players ==
=== Current squad ===
As of 3 November 2012

Note: Flags indicate national team as defined under FIFA eligibility rules; some limited exceptions apply. Players may hold more than one non-FIFA nationality.

No.	Pos.	Nation	Player
2	DF	ITA	Damiano Zanon
3	DF	ITA	Alessandro Crescenzi (on loan from Roma)
4	MF	ITA	Emmanuel Cascione (captain)
5	DF	ITA	Marco Capuano
6	DF	ITA	Simone Romagnoli
7	FW	ITA	Danilo Soddimo
8	MF	ISL	Birkir Bjarnason (on loan from Standard Liège)
9	FW	ITA	Elvis Abbruscato
10	FW	SWE	Mervan Çelik
11	MF	ITA	Francesco Modesto (on loan from Parma)
14	DF	ITA	Antonio Balzano
15	DF	ITA	Antonio Bocchetti
16	MF	URU	Gastón Brugman (on loan from Empoli)
17	MF	SVK	Vladimír Weiss
18	MF	ITA	Giuseppe Colucci
19	FW	BRA	Lucas Chiaretti
20	MF	DEN	Matti Lund Nielsen

No.	Pos.	Nation	Player
21	MF	BRA	Eugênio Rômulo Togni
22	FW	CRO	Ante Vukušić
23	FW	SRB	Marko Jemuović (on loan from CSKA Moscow)
24	MF	ITA	Luca Lulli
25	DF	SEN	David Mbodj Mbaye
26	MF	ITA	Manuele Blasi
32	GK	ITA	Ivan Pelizzoli
32	GK	ITA	Salvatore Falso
55	MF	ITA	Luca Berardocco
77	GK	ITA	Mattia Perin (on loan from Genoa)
80	FW	BRA	Jonathas
88	DF	ITA	Christian Terlizzi
93	MF	COL	Juan Quintero (on loan from Atlético Nacional)
94	DF	ITA	Marco Perrotta
95	GK	ITA	Luca Savelloni
99	FW	ITA	Gianluca Caprari
—	DF	ARG	Nicolás Bianchi Arce

=== Out on loan ===
Note: Flags indicate national team as defined under FIFA eligibility rules; some limited exceptions apply. Players may hold more than one non-FIFA nationality.

No.	Pos.	Nation	Player
—	GK	ITA	Riccardo Ragni (on loan from Nocerina until 30 June 2013)
—	GK	ITA	Francesco Cattenari (at Campobasso until 30 June 2013)
—	DF	ITA	Loris Bacchetti (at Lanciano until 30 June 2013)
—	DF	ITA	Massimiliano Barbone (at Chieti until 30 June 2013)
—	DF	ITA	Riccardo Brosco (at Ternana until 30 June 2013)

No.	Pos.	Nation	Player
—	DF	ITA	Eugenio Calvarese (at Paganese until 30 June 2013)
—	DF	ITA	Emanuele Saladino (at Aprilia until 30 June 2013)
—	FW	ITA	Riccardo Maniero (at Ternana until 30 June 2013)
—	FW	ITA	Antonino Ragusa (at Ternana until 30 June 2013)
—	FW	ITA	Daniele Sciarra (at Campobasso until 30 June 2013)

== Matches ==
=== Legend ===
Win Draw Loss Postponed

=== Serie A ===
Pos	Team	Pld	W	D	L	GF	GA	GD	Pts	Qualification or relegation
16	Torino	38	8	16	14	46	55	−9	39 (Note: Sampdoria and Torino were docked 1 point due to involvement in the 2011–12 Italian football scandal.)	
17	Genoa	38	8	14	16	38	52	−14	38	
18	Palermo (R)	38	6	14	18	34	54	−20	32	Relegation to Serie B
19	Siena (R)	38	9	9	20	36	57	−21	30 (Note: Siena was docked 6 points due to involvement in the 2011–12 Italian football scandal.)	Relegation to Serie B
20	Pescara (R)	38	6	4	28	27	84	−57	22	Relegation to Serie B

Source: Serie A, Soccerway
Rules for classification: 1st points; 2nd head-to-head points; 3rd head-to-head goal difference; 4th goal difference; 5th number of goals scored; 6th public draw.
(Head-to-head record is applied for clubs with the same number of points only once all matches between said clubs have been played)
(R) Relegated
Notes:

26 August 2012 1	Pescara	0–3	Inter Milan	Pescara
20:45		Report	Sneijder 17'; Milito 19'; Coutinho 81'	Stadium: Stadio Adriatico; Attendance: 22,000; Referee: Marco Guida

1 September 2012 2	Torino	3–0	Pescara	Turin
18:00	Sgrigna 34'; Brighi 58'; Bianchi 62'	Report		Stadium: Stadio Olimpico; Attendance: 15,000; Referee: Carmine Russo

16 September 2012 3	Pescara	2–3	Sampdoria	Pescara
15:00	Çelik 75'; Caprari 90'	Report	López 31', 76'; Estigarribia 60'	Stadium: Stadio Adriatico; Attendance: 22,000; Referee: Riccardo Pinzani

23 September 2012 4	Bologna	1–1	Pescara	Bologna
15:00	Gilardino 8'	Report	Quintero 40'	Stadium: Stadio Renato Dall'Ara; Attendance: 22,491; Referee: Andrea Romeo

26 September 2012 5	Pescara	1–0	Palermo	Pescara
18:30	Weiss 86'	Report		Stadium: Stadio Adriatico; Referee: Daniele Doveri

30 September 2012 6	Cagliari	1–2	Pescara	Quartu Sant'Elena
14:00	Pinilla 82' (pen.)		Terlizzi 50'; Weiss 76'	Stadium: Stadio Is Arenas; Attendance: 10000; Referee: Antonio Damato

7 October 2012 7	Pescara	0–3	Lazio	Pescara
14:00			Hernanes 5'; Klose 25', 36'	Stadium: Stadio Adriatico; Attendance: 13000; Referee: Andrea De Marco

21 October 2012 8	Udinese	1–0	Pescara	Udine
14:00	Maicosuel 53'			Stadium: Stadio Friuli; Attendance: 18000; Referee: Antonio Giannoccaro

28 October 2012 9	Pescara	0–0	Atalanta	Pescara
14:00				Stadium: Stadio Adriatico; Attendance: 10000; Referee: Paolo Valeri

31 October 2012 10	Chievo	2–0	Pescara	Verona
19:45	Luciano 75' (pen.); Stoian 77'			Stadium: Stadio Marc'Antonio Bentegodi; Attendance: 9500; Referee: Emilio Ostinelli

4 November 2012 11	Pescara	2–0	Parma	Pescara
11:30	Abbruscato 48'; Weiss 90+3'			Stadium: Stadio Adriatico; Attendance: 16000; Referee: Davide Massa

10 November 2012 12	Pescara	1–6	Juventus	Pescara
19:45	Cascione 25'		Vidal 9'; Quagliarella 22', 45', 53'; Asamoah 30'; Giovinco 38'	Stadium: Stadio Adriatico; Attendance: 22000; Referee: Luca Banti

18 November 2012 13	Siena	1–0	Pescara	Siena
14:00	Valiani 31'			Stadium: Stadio Artemio Franchi; Attendance: 9500; Referee: Massimiliano Irrati

25 November 2012 14	Pescara	0–1	Roma	Pescara
14:00			Destro 5'	Stadium: Stadio Adriatico; Attendance: 13,445; Referee: Andrea Gervasoni

2 December 2012 15	Napoli	5–1	Pescara	Naples
11:30	Inler 9', 78'; Hamšík 15'; Cavani 58' (pen.), 63'		Bjarnason 18'	Stadium: Stadio San Paolo; Attendance: 37,000; Referee: Sebastiano Peruzzo

9 December 2012 16	Pescara	2–0	Genoa	Pescara
14:00	Abbruscato 53'; Vukušić 74'			Stadium: Stadio Adriatico; Attendance: 15000; Referee: Domenico Celi

16 December 2012 17	Milan	4–1	Pescara	Milan
15:00	Nocerino 1'; Abbruscato 51' (o.g.); Jonathas 79' (o.g.); El Shaarawy 81'		Terlizzi 56'	Stadium: San Siro; Attendance: 50,000; Referee: Antonio Gionnaccaro

21 December 2012 18	Pescara	2–1	Catania	Pescara
17:00	Çelik 23'; Togni 90+5'		Barrientos 35'	Stadium: Stadio Adriatico; Attendance: 10,246; Referee: Andrea Romeo

6 January 2013 19	Fiorentina	0–2	Pescara	Florence
15:00			Çelik 90+1'; Jonathas 57'	Stadium: Stadio Artemio Franchi; Attendance: 23,795; Referee: Piero Giacomelli

12 January 2013 20	Inter Milan	2–0	Pescara	Milan
15:00	Palacio 31'; Guarín 54'			Stadium: San Siro; Attendance: 39,118; Referee: Domenico Celi

20 January 2013 21	Pescara	0–2	Torino	Pescara
15:00			Santana 4'; Cerci 41'	Stadium: Stadio Adriatico; Attendance: 14,000; Referee: Paolo Mazzoleni

27 January 2013 22	Sampdoria	6–0	Pescara	Genoa
15:00	Éder 31' (pen.); Icardi 42', 56', 59', 72'; Obiang 50'			Stadium: Stadio Luigi Ferraris; Attendance: 23,000; Referee: Dino Tommasi

2 February 2013 23	Pescara	2–3	Bologna	Pescara
17:00	Weiss 30' (pen.); D'Agostino 45' (pen.)		Diamanti 34' (pen.); Gilardino 50'; Kone 66'	Stadium: Stadio Adriatico; Attendance: 13,000; Referee: Elenito Di Liberatore

10 February 2013 24	Palermo	1–1	Pescara	Palermo
15:00	Fabbrini 80'		Bjarnason 73'	Stadium: Stadio Renzo Barbera; Attendance: 18,000; Referee: Massimiliano Irrati

17 February 2013 25	Pescara	0–2	Cagliari	Pescara
14:00			Sau 53', 61'	Stadium: Stadio Adriatico; Attendance: 11,203; Referee: Andrea Gervasoni

25 February 2013 26	Lazio	2–0	Pescara	Rome
17:00	Radu 29'; Lulić 35'			Stadium: Stadio Olimpico; Attendance: 31,000; Referee: Andrea Romeo

3 March 2013 27	Pescara	0–1	Udinese	Pescara
17:00			Di Natale 8'	Stadium: Stadio Adriatico; Attendance: 23,000; Referee: Carmine Russo

10 March 2013 28	Atalanta	2–1	Pescara	Bergamo
15:00	Denis 34' (pen.), 67'		D'Agostino 24'	Stadium: Stadio Atleti Azzurri d'Italia; Attendance: 20,000; Referee: Domenico Celi

17 March 2013 29	Pescara	0–2	Chievo	Pescara
17:00			Stoian 88'; Théréau 90+3'	Stadium: Stadio Adriatico; Attendance: 12,000; Referee: Paolo Silvio Mazzoleni

31 March 2013 30	Parma	3–0	Pescara	Parma
15:00 CET	Benalouane 18'; Paletta 52'; Amauri 65'			Stadium: Stadio Ennio Tardini; Attendance: 10,546; Referee: Marco Di Bello

7 April 2013 31	Juventus	2–1	Pescara	Turin
17:00	Vučinić 72' (pen.), 78'		Cascione 83'	Stadium: Juventus Stadium; Attendance: 38,790; Referee: Sebastiano Peruzzo

14 April 2013 32	Pescara	2–3	Siena	Pescara
17:00	Çelik 52'; Togni 59'		Ângelo 14'; Zanon 33' (o.g.); Emeghara 86'	Stadium: Stadio Adriatico; Attendance: 8,851; Referee: Nicola Rizzoli

21 April 2013 33	Roma	1–1	Pescara	Rome
17:00	Destro 51'		Caprari 14'	Stadium: Stadio Olimpico; Attendance: 40,000; Referee: Davide Massa

28 April 2013 34	Pescara	0–3	Napoli	Pescara
17:00			Inler 46'; Pandev 58'; Džemaili 81'	Stadium: Stadio Adriatico; Attendance: 17,569; Referee: Andrea Romeo

5 May 2013 35	Genoa	4–1	Pescara	Genoa
17:00	Floro Flores 19'; Borriello 30', 54'; Bertolacci 70'		Sculli 35'	Stadium: Stadio Luigi Ferraris; Referee: Andrea Gervasoni

8 May 2013 36	Pescara	0–4	Milan	Pescara
17:00			Balotelli 9' (pen.), 57'; Muntari 33'; Flamini 51'	Stadium: Stadio Adriatico; Attendance: 12,000; Referee: Carmine Russo

12 May 2013 37	Catania	1–0	Pescara	Catania
17:00	Gómez 51'			Stadium: Stadio Angelo Massimino; Attendance: 15,613; Referee: Fabrizio Pasqua

19 May 2013 38	Pescara	1–5	Fiorentina	Pescara
17:00	Vittiglio 76'		Ljajić 16', 24', 59'; Fernández 28'; Jovetić 54'	Stadium: Stadio Adriatico; Attendance: 13,000; Referee: Andrea De Marco

=== Coppa Italia ===
5 December 2012	Cagliari	4–2	Pescara	Quartu Sant'Elena
17:30	Ribeiro 6', 21', 61'; Pinilla 76'		Cascione 33' (pen.); Weiss 79'	Stadium: Stadio Is Arenas

== Squad statistics ==
=== Appearances and goals ===
No.	Pos	Nat	Player	Total		Serie A		Coppa Italia	
No.	Pos	Nat	Player	Apps	Goals	Apps	Goals	Apps	Goals
Goalkeepers
32	GK	(Italy) ITA	Ivan Pelizzoli	12	0	10+1	0	1	0
77	GK	(Italy) ITA	Mattia Perin	30	0	28+1	0	1	0
Defenders
2	DF	(Italy) ITA	Damiano Zanon	25	0	21+2	0	1+1	0
3	DF	(Denmark) DEN	Per Krøldrup	5	0	5	0	0	0
5	DF	(Italy) ITA	Marco Capuano	27	0	23+3	0	1	0
6	DF	(Italy) ITA	Luciano Zauri	8	0	6+2	0	0	0
14	DF	(Italy) ITA	Antonio Balzano	28	0	23+3	0	2	0
15	DF	(Italy) ITA	Antonio Bocchetti	25	0	23+1	0	1	0
23	DF	(Serbia) SRB	Uroš Ćosić	21	0	20	0	1	0
28	DF	(Argentina) ARG	Nicolás Bianchi Arce	10	0	5+5	0	0	0
Midfielders
4	MF	(Italy) ITA	Emmanuel Cascione	32	3	23+7	2	2	1
8	MF	(Iceland) ISL	Birkir Bjarnason	25	2	17+7	2	0+1	0
10	MF	(Sweden) SWE	Mervan Çelik	24	4	11+12	4	1	0
11	MF	(Italy) ITA	Francesco Modesto	19	0	19	0	0	0
17	MF	(Slovakia) SVK	Vladimír Weiss	23	5	16+6	4	0+1	1
18	MF	(Italy) ITA	Giuseppe Rizzo	11	0	10+1	0	0	0
21	MF	(Brazil) BRA	Eugênio Rômulo Togni	17	2	16+1	2	0	0
26	MF	(Italy) ITA	Manuele Blasi	12	0	11+1	0	0	0
70	MF	(Italy) ITA	Gaetano D'Agostino	7	2	7	2	0	0
93	MF	(Colombia) COL	Juan Quintero	17	1	12+5	1	0	0
Forwards
7	FW	(Italy) ITA	Giuseppe Sculli	10	1	8+2	1	0	0
9	FW	(Italy) ITA	Elvis Abbruscato	26	3	11+14	2	1	1
19	FW	(Brazil) BRA	Lucas Chiaretti	1	0	0	0	0+1	0
22	FW	(Croatia) CRO	Ante Vukušić	19	1	13+6	1	0	0
33	FW	(Italy) ITA	Ferdinando Sforzini	10	0	9+1	0	0	0
60	FW	(Argentina) ARG	Milton Caraglio	4	0	3+1	0	0	0
99	FW	(Italy) ITA	Gianluca Caprari	26	2	14+10	2	2	0
Players transferred out during the season
6	DF	(Italy) ITA	Simone Romagnoli	8	0	6+1	0	1	0
7	FW	(Italy) ITA	Danilo Soddimo	1	0	0+1	0	0	0
18	MF	(Italy) ITA	Giuseppe Colucci	12	0	9+2	0	1	0
20	MF	(Denmark) DEN	Matti Lund Nielsen	21	0	15+4	0	2	0
80	FW	(Brazil) BRA	Jonathas	14	1	8+4	1	1+1	0
88	DF	(Italy) ITA	Christian Terlizzi	12	2	11	2	1	0

Last updated: 28 October 2012
Source: Competitions

=== Top scorers ===
This includes all competitive matches. The list is sorted by shirt number when total goals are equal.

R	No.	Pos	Nat	Name	Serie A	Coppa Italia	Total
1	17	MF	(Slovakia)	Vladimír Weiss	4	1	5
2	10	FW	(Sweden)	Mervan Çelik	4	0	4
3	4	MF	(Italy)	Emmanuel Cascione	2	1	3
4	8	MF	(Iceland)	Birkir Bjarnason	2	0	2
=	9	FW	(Italy)	Elvis Abbruscato	2	0	2
=	21	MF	(Brazil)	Eugênio Rômulo Togni	2	0	2
=	70	MF	(Italy)	Gaetano D'Agostino	2	0	2
=	88	DF	(Italy)	Christian Terlizzi	2	0	2
=	99	FW	(Italy)	Gianluca Caprari	2	0	2
10	7	MF	(Italy)	Giuseppe Sculli	1	0	1
=	22	FW	(Croatia)	Ante Vukušić	1	0	1
=	46	DF	(Italy)	Marco Vittiglio	1	0	1
=	80	FW	(Brazil)	Jonathas	1	0	1
=	93	MF	(Colombia)	Juan Quintero	1	0	1

Last updated: 28 October 2012
Source: Competitions
