= List of Italian football transfers winter 2010–11 =

This is a list of Italian football transfers for the 2010–11 season. Only moves from Serie A and Serie B are listed.

The Italian winter transfer window opened for four weeks starting from 3 January 2011 (Monday). Players without a club could join one either during or in between transfer windows. Outgoing international transfers depended on the status of transfer windows in the country the player arrived in.

Clubs could still use their single non-EU international signing quota in the winter window if they did not use the quota in the summer, subject to the club having either released the player (on 1 July 2010), sold them abroad, or naming one player which had obtained an EU passport recently. These transfers are marked yellow.

== Winter transfer window ==
Date	Name	Nationality	Moving from	Moving to	Fee
2010-09-08^{1}	Anthony Vanden Borre	Belgium	Genoa	(Belgium) Genk	Free
2010-11-24	Alain Nef	Switzerland	Udinese	(Switzerland) Young Boys	Undisclosed
2010-12-07^{1}	Siniša Anđelković	Slovenia	(Slovenia) Maribor	Palermo	Undisclosed
2010-12-18^{1}	Jasmin Kurtić	Slovenia	(Slovenia) Gorica	Palermo	Undisclosed
2010-12-20^{1}	Antonio Cassano	Italy	Sampdoria	Milan	Free (€1.66M paid to Real Madrid)
2010-12-20^{1}	Enej Jelenic	Slovenia	(Slovenia) Koper	Genoa	Undisclosed
2010-12-21	Jo Inge Berget	Norway	Udinese	(Norway) Strømsgodset	Loan (extended until 31 December 2011)
2010-12-22^{1}	Andrea Germano	Italy	Hellenika (youth)	Brescia (youth)	Undisclosed
2010-12-23^{1}	Luca Antonelli	Italy	Parma	Genoa	€7M (player swap)
2010-12-23^{1}	Alberto Paloschi	Italy	Parma	Genoa	€4.35M (player swap, co-ownership with Milan)
2010-12-23^{1}	Francesco Modesto	Italy	Genoa	Parma	€2.5M (player swap)
2010-12-23^{1}	Raffaele Palladino	Italy	Genoa	Parma	€3M (player swap, co-ownership with Juventus)
2010-12-26^{1}	Toni Calvo	Spain	(Greece) Aris Thessaloniki	Parma	Loan
2011-12-27^{1}	Alessandro Cibocchi	Italy	Deruta (amateur)	Portogruaro	Undisclosed
2010-12-28^{1}	Odion Ighalo	Nigeria	Udinese (on loan at Cesena)	(Spain) Granada	Loan
2010-12-29	Diego Cavalieri	Brazil	Cesena	(Brazil) Fluminense	Undisclosed
2010-12-29^{1}	Andrea Ranocchia	Italy	Genoa	Internazionale	Co-ownership resolution
2010-12-30^{1}	Paolo Sammarco	Italy	Sampdoria	Cesena	Loan
2010-12-30	Pablo Barrientos	Argentina	Catania	(Argentina) Estudiantes LP	Loan
2011-01-02^{1}	Fabio Cusaro	Italy	Cesena (on loan at Bellaria I.M.)	Foligno	Loan
2011-01-03	Dario Biasi	Italy	Cagliari	Frosinone	Undisclosed
2011-01-03	Andrea Giallombardo	Italy	Ascoli	Grosseto	Loan
2011-01-03	Papa Waigo	Senegal	Fiorentina	Grosseto	Loan
2011-01-03	Marino Defendi	Italy	Atalanta	Grosseto	Loan
2011-01-03	Francesco Bardi	Italy	Livorno (youth)	Internazionale (youth)	Loan
2011-01-03	Nenad Tomović	Serbia	Genoa	Lecce	Loan
2011-01-03	Simone Malatesta	Italy	Parma (on loan at Carpi)	Pro Vercelli	Loan
2011-01-03	Júlio Baptista	Brazil	Roma	(Spain) Málaga	€2.5M
2011-01-03	Andrea Parola	Italy	Unattached (Cagliari)	Novara	Free
2011-01-03	Francesco Virdis	Italy	Sampdoria (at South Tyrol, t)	Pomezia	Loan
2011-01-03	Anthony Taugourdeau	France	AlbinoLeffe	Prato	Loan
2011-01-03	Jonathan Rossini	Switzerland	Sampdoria (& Udinese)	Sassuolo	Loan
2011-01-04	Daniele Marcarini	Italy	Pergocrema (youth)	Atalanta (youth)	Undisclosed
2011-01-04	Alessandro Vinci	Italy	Bologna (youth)	Carpi	Loan
2011-01-04	Kamil Glik	Poland	Palermo	Bari	Loan
2011-01-04	Davide Lanzafame	Italy	Juventus (& Palermo)	Brescia	Loan
2011-01-04	Christian Miljević	Serbia	(Greece) PAOK	Brescia (youth)	Undisclosed
2011-01-04	Pelé	Portugal	(Portugal) Belenenses	Genoa	Undisclosed
2011-01-04	Linus Hallenius	Sweden	(Sweden) Hammarby	Genoa	Undisclosed
2011-01-04	Cristian Bucchi	Italy	Napoli	Pescara	Loan
2011-01-04	Salvatore D'Alterio	Italy	Pescara	Salernitana	Loan
2011-04-04	Antonino Bonvissuto	Italy	Bari	Sorrento	Loan
2011-01-04	Vincenzo Fiorillo	Italy	Sampdoria	Spezia	Loan
2011-01-05	Franco Lepore	Italy	Varese	Paganese	Loan
2011-01-05	Giorgio Santarelli	Italy	Ascoli	Paganese	Loan
2011-01-05	Orlando Urbano	Italy	Vicenza	Paganese	Undisclosed
2011-01-05	Kris Thackray	England	Reggina (on loan at Andria)	Cosenza	Loan
2011-01-05	Pietro Marino	Italy	Reggina	Cosenza	Loan
2011-01-05	Giancarlo Petrocco	Italy	Cosenza	Reggina	Loan
2011-01-05	Stefano Okaka	Italy	Roma	Bari	Loan
2011-01-06	Mancini	Brazil	Internazionale	(Brazil) Atlético Mineiro	Undisclosed
2011-01-06	Maurizio Ciaramitaro	Italy	Palermo	Modena	Free
2011-01-07	Mattia Minesso	Italy	Vicenza (& Chievo)	Andria	Loan
2011-01-07	Julian Uccello	Canada	Crotone	Casale	Loan
2011-01-07	Alex Calderoni	Italy	Atletico Roma	Cesena	Loan
2011-01-07	Paolo Hernán Dellafiore	Italy	Palermo (on loan at Parma)	Cesena	Loan
2011-01-07	Mirco Gasparetto	Italy	Chievo	Cremonese	Loan
2011-01-07	Diego Farias	Brazil	Chievo	Foggia	Loan
2011-01-07	Andrea Molinelli	Italy	Piacenza	Genoa	Loan
2011-01-07	Ferdinando Sforzini	Italy	Udinese	Grosseto	Loan
2011-01-07	Samuel Teuber	Chile	(Chile) O'Higgins	Grosseto	Loan
2011-01-07	Luca Toni	Italy	Genoa	Juventus	Free
2011-01-07	Roberto Cortese	Italy	Chievo (on loan at Foggia)	Paganese	Loan
2011-01-07	Isaac Cofie	Ghana	Genoa	Piacenza	Loan
2011-01-07	Iacopo Fanucchi	Italy	Empoli	Pisa	Loan
2011-01-07	Federico Macheda	Italy	(England) Manchester United	Sampdoria	Loan
2011-01-08	Neto	Brazil	(Brazil) Atlético Paranaense	Fiorentina	Undisclosed
2011-01-08	Christoph Knasmüllner	Austria	(Germany) Bayern Munich II	Internazionale (youth)	Undisclosed
2011-01-08	Lukas Spendlhofer	Austria	(Austria) St. Pölten	Internazionale (youth)	Undisclosed
2011-01-10	Enrico Geroni	Italy	AlbinoLeffe	Barletta	Loan
2011-01-10	Antonio Mazzotta	Italy	Lecce (co-own with Palermo, at Pescara)	Crotone	Loan
2011-01-10	Erminio Rullo	Italy	Napoli	Modena	Free
2011-01-10	Alessandro Gambadori	Italy	Varese	Monza	Loan
2011-01-10	Tommaso Scuffia	Italy	Fiorentina (youth)	Rimini (amateur)	Loan
2011-01-10	Fabio Concas	Italy	Ternana	Varese	Undisclosed
2011-01-11	Abdou Doumbia	France	Parma (on loan at Atletico Roma)	Ascoli	Loan
2011-01-11	Marco Calderoni	Italy	Piacenza	Ascoli	Loan
2011-01-11	Ronaldinho	Brazil	Milan	(Brazil) Flamengo	Undisclosed
2011-01-11	Emmanuel Ledesma	Argentina	Crotone	Genoa	Co-ownership resolution
2011-01-11	Juraj Kucka	Slovakia	(Czech Republic) Sparta Prague	Genoa	Undisclosed
2011-01-11	Jefferson	Brazil	Udinese (youth)	Salernitana	Loan
2011-01-11	Giacomo Lepri	Italy	Paganese	San Marino	Undisclosed (co-ownership with Fiorentina)
2011-01-11	Oguchi Onyewu	United States	Milan	(Netherlands) Twente	Loan
11 January 2011	Laurent Lanteri	Novara	Casale	End of loan	
2011-01-12	Guido Marilungo	Italy	Sampdoria	Atalanta	Undisclosed
2011-01-12	Antonio Rizzo	Italy	Reggina	Cosenza	Undisclosed
2011-01-12	Luca Lulli	Italy	Pescara	Gavorrano	Loan
2011-01-12	Alessandro Bernardi	Italy	Cosenza	Reggina	Loan
2011-01-12	Massimo Loviso	Italy	Torino	Crotone	Loan
2011-01-12	Fernando Forestieri	Italy	Udinese (& Genoa)	Empoli	Loan
2011-01-12	Salvatore Caturano	Italy	Empoli	Andria	Loan
2011-01-13	Gergely Rudolf	Hungary	Genoa	Bari	Loan
2011-01-13	Ugo Gabrieli	Italy	Lecce (on loan at Paganese)	Barletta	Loan
2011-01-13	Jacub Vojtus	Slovakia	Internazionale (youth)	Chievo (youth)	Loan
2011-01-13	Mauro Boselli	Argentina	(England) Wigan	Genoa	Loan
2011-01-13	Tallo	Côte d'Ivoire	Chievo (youth)	Internazionale (youth)	Loan
2011-01-13	Keivan Zarineh	Iran	Roma	Latina	Loan
2011-01-13	Marcos de Paula	Brazil	Chievo	Padova	Loan
2011-01-13	Gabriele Puccio	Italy	Portogruaro	Pavia	Undisclosed (co-ownership with Internazionale)
2011-01-13	Umberto Eusepi	Italy	Varese (& Genoa)	Pavia	Loan
2011-01-13	Fabinho	Brazil	Udinese (youth)	Salernitana	Loan
13 January 2011	Daniele Buzzegoli	Italy	Varese	Spezia	€100,000
2011-01-13	Alessandro Budel	Italy	Brescia (& Parma)	Torino	Loan
2011-01-13	Matías Miramontes	Argentina	Cremonese	Triestina	Loan
2011-01-13	Cicinho	Brazil	Roma	(Spain) Villarreal	Loan
2011-01-14	Aldo Simoncini	San Marino	Bellaria I.M.	Cesena	Undisclosed
2011-01-14	Alex Teodorani	Italy	Cesena	Bellaria I.M.	Loan
2011-01-15	Felipe Sanchón	Spain	Udinese (on loan at Granada)	(Spain) Gimnàstic	Loan
2011-01-15	Giuseppe Caccavallo	Italy	Lecce (on loan at Barletta)	Pergocrema	Loan
2011-01-16	Marco Serena	Italy	Suspended (Piacenza)	Valenzana	Free
2011-01-17	Luigi Rana	Italy	Bari	Barletta	Loan
2011-01-17	Giuseppe Rizza	Italy	Livorno (on loan at Pergocrema)	Juve Stabia	Loan
2011-01-18	Gennaro Delvecchio	Italy	Catania	Atalanta	Loan
2011-01-18	Matteo Merini	Italy	Sangiovannese	Carrarese	€500 (co-ownership with Chievo)
2011-01-18	Antonio Floro Flores	Italy	Udinese	Genoa	Loan
2011-01-18	Sergiu Suciu	Romania	Torino	Gubbio	Loan
2011-01-18	Giuseppe Sculli	Italy	Genoa	Lazio	Undisclosed
18 January 2011	Bruno Martella	Italy	Pescara (youth)	Sampdoria (youth)	Co-ownership, €250,000
2011-01-18	Joel Ekstrand	Sweden	(Sweden) Helsingborg	Udinese	Undisclosed
2011-01-19	Mattia Valoti	Italy	Albinoleffe (youth)	Milan (youth)	Co-ownership, undisclosed
2011-01-19	Mattia Valoti	Italy	Milan (youth)	Albinoleffe (youth)	Loan
2011-01-19	Alberto Frison	Italy	Vicenza	Frosinone	Loan
2011-01-19	Rincón	Brazil	Chievo (co-owned with Internazionale)	Grosseto	Loan
2011-01-19	Giuseppe Greco	Italy	Genoa	Modena	Loan
2011-01-19	Zsolt Laczkó	Hungary	(Hungary) Debrecen	Sampdoria	Undisclosed
2011-01-19	Domenico Girardi	Italy	Chievo	Taranto	Loan
2011-01-19	Ousmane Sy	France	Reggina	Taranto	Loan
2011-01-20	Danilo Pereira	Portugal	Parma	(Greece) Aris Thessaloniki	Loan
2011-01-20	Davide Zappacosta	Italy	Isola Liri	Atalanta	Co-ownership, undisclosed
2011-01-20	Giacomo Zappacosta	Italy	Pescara	Barletta	Loan
2011-01-20	Savio	Germany	Fiorentina	(Bulgaria) Chernomorets Burgas	Loan
2011-01-20	Sebastian De Maio	France	Brescia	Frosinone	Loan
2011-01-20	Stefano Del Sante	Italy	Varese (& Fiorentina, at Pavia)	Lecco	Loan
2011-01-20	Adam Kokoszka	Poland	Empoli	(Poland) Polonia Warszawa	Loan
2011-01-20	Francesco Scarpa	Italy	Taranto	Portogruaro	Loan
2011-01-20	Souleymane Diamoutene	Mali	Lecce	Pescara	Loan
2011-01-20	Laurenţiu Brănescu	Romania	(Romania) Râmnicu Vâlcea	Juventus (youth)	€0.6M
2011-01-20	Riccardo Bocalon	Italy	Internazionale	Viareggio	Loan
2011-01-20	Carlo Gervasoni	Italy	Cremonese	Piacenza	Loan
2011-01-20	Mattia Mustacchio	Italy	Sampdoria (on loan at Varese)	Vicenza	Loan
2011-01-21	Edenilson Bergonsi	Brazil	Varese	(Belgium) Brussels	Undisclosed
2011-01-21	Café	Brazil	Varese	(Belgium) Brussels	Undisclosed
2011-01-21	Fernando Uribe	Colombia	(Colombia) Once Caldas	Chievo	Undisclosed
2011-01-21	Abdoulay Konko	France	(Spain) Sevilla	Genoa	Undisclosed
2011-01-21	Alex Pinardi	Italy	Cagliari	Novara	Undisclosed
2011-01-21	David Meza	Paraguay	Cesena	Pavia	Loan
2011-01-21	Daniele Sciarra	Italy	Aversa	Roma	Co-ownership resolution
2011-01-22	Guly	Brazil	Cesena	(England) Southampton	Undisclosed
22 January 2011	Mirco Antenucci	Italy	Catania	Torino	Co-ownership, €1.7M
2011-01-23	Urby Emanuelson	Netherlands	(Netherlands) Ajax	Milan	Undisclosed
24 January 2011	Roberto Maurantonio	Unattached	Ascoli	Free	
2011-01-24	Marco Andreolli	Italy	Chievo	Internazionale	Co-ownership, €885,000
2011-01-24	Marco Andreolli	Italy	Internazionale	Chievo	Loan
2011-01-24	Massimo Maccarone	Italy	Palermo	Sampdoria	€2.7M
24 January 2011	Lorenzo Pasqualini	Ascoli	Siracusa	Loan, Free	
24 January 2011	Ciro Immobile	Juventus (at Siena, t)	Grosseto	Loan	
2011-01-24	Lucas Correa	Argentina	Lazio	Varese	Free
2011-01-25	Nico Pulzetti	Italy	Livorno (on loan at Bari)	Chievo	Loan
2011-01-25	Simone Bentivoglio	Italy	Chievo	Bari	Loan
25 January 2011	Simone Missiroli	Italy	Reggina	Cagliari	Loan, €1M
25 January 2011	Valon Behrami	Switzerland	(England) West Ham United	Fiorentina	€2M (plus €775,000 agent fee)
2011-01-25	Ayub Daud	Somalia	Juventus (on loan at Cosenza)	Gubbio	Loan
2011-01-25	Mark van Bommel	Netherlands	(Germany) Bayern Munich	Milan	Free
2011-01-25	Francesco De Rose	Italy	Cosenza	Reggina	Co-ownership, undisclosed
2011-01-25	Vincenzo Sarno	Italy	Pro Patria	Reggina	Free
2011-01-26	Gabriele Loccisano	Italy	Bari (on loan at Arci)	Cesena	Free
2011-01-26	Saša Bjelanović	Croatia	(Romania) Cluj	Atalanta	Undisclosed
2011-01-26	Daniele Sciarra	Italy	Roma	Barletta	Co-ownership, undisclosed
2011-01-26	Bruno Montelongo	Uruguay	(Uruguay) River Plate (on loan at Milan)	Bologna	Loan
2011-01-26	Alessandro Faroni	Italy	Lumezzane	Chievo	Loan
2011-01-26	Willy Aubameyang	Gabon	Milan (on loan at Monza)	(Scotland) Kilmarnock	Free
2011-01-26	Kerlon	Brazil	Internazionale	(Brazil) Paraná	Loan
2011-01-26	Mauro Icardi	Argentina	(Spain) Barcelona (youth)	Sampdoria (youth)	Loan
2011-01-27	Roope Riski	Finland	(Finland) TPS	Cesena	Undisclosed
2011-01-27	Luigi Scaglia	Italy	Brescia (on loan at Torino)	Cremonese	Loan
2011-01-27	Andrea Barzagli	Italy	(Germany) Wolfsburg	Juventus	€0.3M + bonus €0.3M max.
2011-01-27	Víctor Ruiz	Spain	(Spain) Espanyol	Napoli	Undisclosed (cash plus Dátolo)
2011-01-27	Jesús Dátolo	Argentina	Napoli	(Spain) Espanyol	Undisclosed (part of Ruiz's deal)
2011-01-27	Raffaele De Martino	Italy	Crotone	Nocerina	Free
27 January 2011	Matteo Ardemagni	Italy	Atalanta	Padova	Loan
2011-01-28	Alberto Filippini	Italy	Padova	Como	Loan
2011-01-28	Milan Đurić	Bosnia–Herzegovina	Parma (& Cesena, on loan at Ascoli)	Crotone	Loan
2011-01-28	Caetano	Brazil	Frosinone	Crotone	Undisclosed (player swap)
2011-01-28	Nicola Beati	Italy	Crotone	Frosinone	Undisclosed (player swap)
2011-01-28	Manolo Pestrin	Italy	Salernitana	Frosinone	Undisclosed (player swap)
2011-01-28	Salvatore Aurelio	Italy	Frosinone	Salernitana	Loan (player swap)
2011-01-28	Gianluigi Bianco	Italy	Sampdoria (on loan at Sassuolo)	Frosinone	Loan (player swap)
2011-01-28	Gaetano Masucci	Italy	Sassuolo	Frosinone	Loan (player swap)
2011-01-28	Antonio Bocchetti	Italy	Frosinone	Sassuolo	Loan (player swap)
2011-01-28	Giampaolo Pazzini	Italy	Sampdoria	Internazionale	€19M (cash plus Biabiany)
2011-01-28	Jonathan Biabiany	France	Internazionale	Sampdoria	€7M (part of Pazzini's deal)
28 January 2011	Douglas Packer	Brazil	Siena	(Brazil) Paraná	Loan
28 January 2011	Gaetano Capogrosso	Italy	Siena (at Piacenza, t)	Ascoli	Loan
28 January 2011	Mario Titone	Italy	Sassuolo	Lanciano	Loan
28 January 2011	Luca Belingheri	Italy	Torino	Livorno	€300,000
28 January 2011	Biagio Pagano	Italy	Livorno	Torino	€300,000
28 January 2011	Dídac Vilà	Spain	(Spain) Espanyol	Milan	€4M
2011-01-28	Michele Marconi	Italy	Atalanta (at Pavia, t)	Pergocrema	Loan
2011-01-28	Nicola Rigoni	Italy	Palermo	Vicenza	Loan
2011-01-28	Mikhail Sivakov	Belarus	Cagliari	(Poland) Wisła Kraków	Loan
2011-01-28	Mattia Serafini	Italy	AlbinoLeffe	Atletico Roma	Undisclosed
2011-01-29	Alessandro Rosina	Italy	(Russia) Zenit	Cesena	Loan
2011-01-29	Yuto Nagatomo	Japan	(Japan) FC Tokyo	Cesena	Undisclosed
2011-01-29	Bryan Bergougnoux	France	Lecce	(France) Châteauroux	Loan
2011-01-29	Amadou Samb	Senegal	Monza	Chievo	Undisclosed
2011-01-29	Miloš Dimitrijević	Serbia	(Serbia) Rad	Chievo	Loan
2011-01-29	Filippo Savi	Italy	Parma	Crociati Noceto	Loan
2011-01-29	Alberto Cossentino	Italy	Novara	Gela	Loan
2011-01-29	Houssine Kharja	Morocco	Genoa	Internazionale	Loan
2011-01-29	Ledian Memushaj	Albania	Chievo	Portogruaro	Loan
2011-01-29	Vedran Celjak	Croatia	(Croatia) Zagreb	Sampdoria	Undisclosed
2011-01-29	Sulley Muntari	Ghana	Internazionale	(England) Sunderland	Loan
2011-01-29	Davide Sinigaglia	Italy	Cesena (on loan at Lanciano)	Ternana	Undisclosed
2011-01-29	Franco Chiavarini	Argentina	Cesena	Zagreb (Croatia)	Loan
30 January 2011	Federico Rodríguez	(Uruguay) (European Union)	Peñarol (Uruguay)	Genoa	€4.12M
30 January 2011	Robert Gucher		Frosinone (Genoa, c)	Kapfenberger SV (Austria)	Loan (swap with Zigoni)
30 January 2011	Gianmarco Zigoni		Genoa (& Milan, c)	Frosinone	Loan (swap with Gucher)
31 January 2011	Simon Klun		Celje (Slovenia)	AlbinoLeffe	Undisclosed
31 January 2011	Daniele Marino		Melfi	AlbinoLeffe	Co-ownership, undisclosed
31 January 2011	Daniele Marino		AlbinoLeffe	Melfi	Loan
31 January 2011	Giovanni Kyeremateng		Monza	Ascoli	Loan
31 January 2011	Simone Masini		Ascoli	Monza	Loan
31 January 2011	Erik Huseklepp		Brann (Norway)	Bari	Undisclosed
31 January 2011	Paul Codrea		Siena	Bari	Loan
31 January 2011	Francesco Caputo		Bari	Siena	Loan
31 January 2011	Samon Reider Rodríguez		Pergocrema (& Juventus, c)	Bassano (& Juventus, c)	Undisclosed (transfer of co-ownership)
31 January 2011	Cristiano Zanetti		Fiorentina	Brescia	Free
31 January 2011	Jonathas	(Brazil)	AZ (Netherlands)	Brescia	€300,000
31 January 2011	Pietro Accardi		Sampdoria	Brescia	Loan (player swap)
31 January 2011	Gilberto Martínez	(Costa Rica)	Brescia	Sampdoria	Loan (player swap)
2011-01-31	Pablo Ceppelini	(Uruguay)	(Uruguay) Peñarol	Cagliari	Undisclosed
31 January 2011	Lorenzo Ariaudo		Juventus	Cagliari	Co-ownership resolution, €2.5M (swap with Matri)
31 January 2011	Alessandro Matri		Cagliari	Juventus	Loan, €2.5M
31 January 2011	Gonzalo Bergessio	(Argentina)	(France) Saint-Étienne	Catania	Loan
31 January 2011	Francesco Lodi		Frosinone	Catania	€680,000 (transfer of co-ownership)
31 January 2011	Cristian Cesaretti		Empoli	Frosinone	Loan
31 January 2011	Ezequiel Schelotto		Atalanta (at Cesena, t)	Catania	Loan
31 January 2011	Felipe		Fiorentina	Cesena	Loan
31 January 2011	Davide Santon		Internazionale	Cesena	Loan (player swap)
31 January 2011	Yuto Nagatomo	(Japan)	Cesena	Internazionale	Loan (player swap)
31 January 2011	Renald Shehu	(Albania)	Modena (youth)	Chievo (youth)	Loan
31 January 2011	Massimo Melucci		Grosseto	Cittadella	Undisclosed
31 January 2011	Renato Dossena		Barletta	Empoli	Co-ownership resolution
31 January 2011	Renato Dossena		Empoli	Como	Loan
31 January 2011	Daniel Semenzato		Cittadella	Como	
31 January 2011	Francesco Evola		Novara	Cosenza	Loan
31 January 2011	Gennaro Scarlato		Frosinone	Cosenza	
31 January 2011	Andrea Barbuzzi		Atletico Trivento (amateur)	Crotone	Undisclosed
31 January 2011	Kelvin Matute	(Cameroon)	Udinese (at Triestina, t)	Crotone	Co-ownership, undisclosed
31 January 2011	Nelson Rivas	(Colombia)	Internazionale	Dnipro (Ukraine)	Loan
31 January 2011	Federico Laurito		Udinese	Empoli	Loan
31 January 2011	Stefano Baraldo		Piacenza	Empoli	Loan
31 January 2011	Fronois Kabangu	(Democratic Republic of the Congo)	Fiorentina	Empoli	Loan
31 January 2011	Amidu Salifu	(Ghana)	Vicenza (youth)	Fiorentina (youth)	Co-ownership, undisclosed
31 January 2011	Marco Moro		Ascoli	Foligno	Loan
31 January 2011	Mauro Minelli		Sassuolo	Frosinone	Undisclosed
31 January 2011	Alain Baclet		Vicenza	Frosinone	Loan (player swap)
31 January 2011	Pierluigi Frattali		Frosinone	Vicenza	Undisclosed (player swap)
31 January 2011	Paolo Carbonaro		Palermo (on loan at Barletta)	Gela	Loan
31 January 2011	Roberto Crivello		Juventus	Gela	Loan
31 January 2011	Samuele Longo		Internazionale (youth)	Genoa (youth)	Loan
31 January 2011	Marco Crimi		Bari	Grosseto	Loan
31 January 2011	Martin Petráš		Cesena	Grosseto	Free
31 January 2011	Panagiotis Tachtsidis		Genoa	Grosseto	Loan
31 January 2011	Raffaele Alcibiade		Juventus (on loan at Pescara)	Gubbio	Loan
31 January 2011	Marco Benassi		Modena (youth)	Internazionale (youth)	Loan
31 January 2011	Jaime Serrano		Varese (youth)	Internazionale (youth)	Undisclosed
31 January 2011	Jaime Serrano		Internazionale (youth)	Varese (youth)	Loan
31 January 2011	Mario Artistico		Pescara	Lanciano	Loan
31 January 2011	Ameth Fall	(Senegal)	Cesena (on loan at Bellaria	Lecco	Loan
31 January 2011	Marco D'Alessandro		Roma (on loan at Bari)	Livorno	Loan
31 January 2011	Vitorino Antunes		Roma	Livorno	Loan
31 January 2011	Andrey Galabinov		Lumezzane	Livorno	Undisclosed
31 January 2011	Rej Volpato		Livorno	Lumezzane	Loan
31 January 2011	Angelo Bencivenga		Livorno	Lumezzane	Loan
31 January 2011	Claudio Pani		Triestina	Lucchese	Loan
31 January 2011	Enrico Pezzi		Lucchese	Triestina	Co-ownership, undisclosed
31 January 2011	Enrico Pezzi		Triestina	Lucchese	Loan
31 January 2011	Nicola Legrottaglie		Juventus	Milan	Free
31 January 2011	Wágner		Cosenza	Modena	Undisclosed
31 January 2011	Federico Furlan		Varese (co-ownership with Milan)	Monza	Loan
31 January 2011	Antonio Esposito		Internazionale (at Padova, t)	Monza	Loan
31 January 2011	Giuseppe Mascara		Catania	Napoli	Undisclosed
31 January 2011	Jean Romaric Kevin Koffi	(Ivory Coast)	Sanremese	Napoli	Free
31 January 2011	Jean Romaric Kevin Koffi	(Ivory Coast)	Napoli	Siracusa	Loan
31 January 2011	Andrea Petta		Siracusa (youth)	Napoli (youth)	Loan
31 January 2011	Gaetano Carrieri		Torino	Nocerina	Loan
31 January 2011	Amauri		Juventus	Parma	Loan
31 January 2011	Joel Obi	(Nigeria)	Internazionale	Parma	Co-ownership, €750
31 January 2011	Joel Obi	(Nigeria)	Parma	Internazionale	Loan
31 January 2011	Nwankwo Obiora	(Nigeria)	Internazionale	Parma	Loan
31 January 2011	José Carlos Terrón		(Spain) Terrassa (on loan at Gimnástica)	Parma	Loan
31 January 2011	Pablo Andrés González		Novara	Palermo	€5M
31 January 2011	Pablo Andrés González		Palermo	Novara	Loan
31 January 2011	Samir Ujkani		Palermo	Novara	Co-ownership, €1.5M (part of González's deal)
31 January 2011	Michel Morganella		Palermo	Novara	Co-ownership, €1.5M (part of González's deal)
31 January 2011	Luca Meregalli		Milan (at Pro Vercelli, t)	Pavia	Loan
31 January 2011	Tommaso Squillace		Reggina (on loan at Pavia)	Pro Vercelli	Loan
31 January 2011	Andrea Schenetti		Milan	Prato	Loan
31 January 2011	Alessandro Malomo		Roma	Prato	Co-ownership, undisclosed
31 January 2011	Nicola Canzian		Atalanta (at Modena, t)	Pergocrema	Loan
31 January 2011	Stefano Giacomelli		Foligno	Pescara	Co-ownership, undisclosed
31 January 2011	Mariano Stendardo		Genoa	Pisa	Undisclosed
31 January 2011	Simone Esposito		Ascoli	Reggiana	Undisclosed (co-ownership with Juventus)
31 January 2011	Matteo D'Alessandro		Genoa	Reggiana	Co-ownership, undisclosed
31 January 2011	Francesco Acerbi		Pavia	Reggina	Co-ownership resolution
31 January 2011	Francesco Acerbi		Reggina	Genoa	Co-ownership, 1M
31 January 2011	Francesco Acerbi		Genoa	Reggina	Loan
31 January 2011	Mattia Gagliardi		Cosenza	Reggina (youth)	Loan
31 January 2011	Francesco Bontà		Giulianova	Reggina (youth)	Loan
31 January 2011	Giovanni Di Lorenzo		Lucchese	Reggina (youth)	Undisclosed
31 January 2011	Gianluca Lapadula		Parma (at Atletico Roma, t)	Ravenna	Loan
31 January 2011	Romano Perticone		Livorno	Sampdoria	Loan
31 January 2011	Fabrizio Cacciatore		Sampdoria	Siena	Loan
31 January 2011	Alfonso Camorani		Pescara	Sorrento	Loan
31 January 2011	Rocco Sabato		Triestina	Sorrento	Undisclosed
31 January 2011	Davide Grassi		Sorrento	Triestina	Undisclosed
31 January 2011	Giovanni De Giambattista		Ascoli (youth)	Sorrento (youth)	
31 January 2011	Valerio Anastasi		Chievo (at Lecco, t)	South Tyrol	Loan
31 January 2011	Francesco Volpe		Livorno (& Juventus, c)	SPAL	Loan
31 January 2011	Simone Basso		Frosinone	Spezia	Undisclosed
31 January 2011	Diogo Tavares		Frosinone	Ternana	
31 January 2011	Riccardo Taddei		Brescia	Triestina	Undisclosed
31 January 2011	Francesco Dettori		Chievo (& Pescara, c)	Triestina	Loan
31 January 2011	Davide Grassi		Sorrento	Triestina	Undisclosed
31 January 2011	Sebastián Pinto	(European Union)	Audax Italiano (Chile)	Varese	Undisclosed
31 January 2011	Cristiano Ancora		Matera	Varese	Co-ownership, undisclosed
31 January 2011	Cristiano Ancora		Varese	Matera	Loan
31 January 2011	Marco Gaeta		Milan (youth)	Varese (youth)	Co-ownership, undisclosed
31 January 2011	Alemão	(Brazil)	Vicenza (& Udinese, c)	Varese	Loan (player swap)
31 January 2011	Marco Cellini		Varese	Vicenza	Loan (player swap)
31 January 2011	Aiman Napoli		Internazinoale (on loan at Crotone)	Verona	Loan
31 January 2011	Fabio Oliviero		Sampdoria	Viareggio	Loan
31 January 2011	Piermario Morosini		Udinese	Vicenza	Loan
31 January 2011	Dominic Adiyiah	(Ghana)	Milan (at Reggina, t)	Partizan (Serbia)	Loan
1 February 2011	Carlos Valdez	(Uruguay) (European Union)	Reggina (at Siena, t)	Peñarol (Uruguay)	Loan

=== Notes ===
1. Player officially joined his new club on 3 January 2011.

== Out of window transfer ==
Date	Name	Nationality	Moving from	Moving to	Fee
2011-02-06	Mario Bolatti	Argentina	Fiorentina	(Brazil) Internacional	Undisclosed
2011-02-10	Giampietro Perrulli	Italy	Vicenza	Carpi	Free
2011-03-28	Adriano	Brazil	Roma	(Brazil) Corinthians	Free
