= Stadio Guido Angelini =

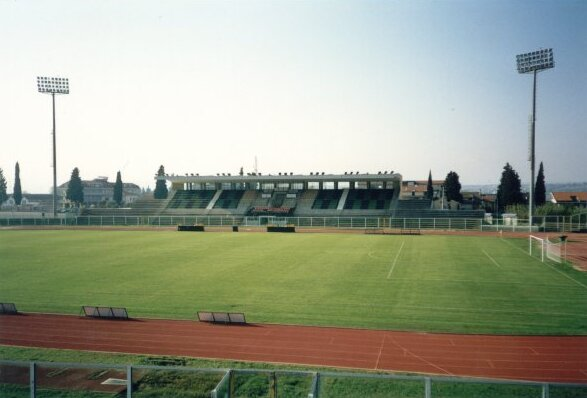
- Interactive map of Stadio Guido Angelini
- Location: Viale Abruzzo; 66,100 Chieti
- Coordinates: 42°20′37″N 14°8′11″E
- Owner: Comune of Chieti
- Capacity: 12,750
- Surface: Grass
- Field size: 105m x 68m

Construction
- Groundbreaking: 1969
- Opened: 1970

Tenant
- S.S. Chieti Calcio

Website
- Official website

Stadio Guido Angelini is a multi-use stadium in Chieti, Abruzzo, Italy. It is currently used mostly for football matches and is the home ground of S.S. Chieti Calcio.

== History ==
The stadium, named after the historic president of S.S. Chieti Calcio Guido Angelini, was built in 1969 in the lower part of the city and officially opened in 1970 with a friendly match (refereed by Concetto Lo Bello) against the A.C. Milan. The stadium is located in a sports center in the Santa Filomena neighborhood where there are several covered arenas, built for volleyball, basketball, futsal, handball, and a grass field that hosts sports such as rugby, baseball, and a training ground for Chieti Calcio. After renovations in 2006, the stadium added a grandstand, a new curve named after Ezio Volpi, which houses the home fans. The stadium capacity is approved for 9,007 seats, but after the construction of the new curve, the maximum capacity reaches 12,750 people. The stadium also has a press box consisting of about 80 seats.
