= ASD Mezzolara =

Italian football club

Mezzolara
- Full name: Associazione Sportiva Dilettantistica Mezzolara
- Founded: 1965
- Ground: Stadio Pietro Zucchini, Budrio, Italy
- Capacity: 1,300
- Chairman: Sergio Benetti
- Manager: Eugênio Rômulo Togni
- League: Serie D
- 2025–26: 17th
Home colours	Away colours

Associazione Sportiva Dilettantistica Mezzolara is an Italian association football club located in Mezzolara, a frazione of Budrio, Emilia-Romagna. It currently plays in Serie D.

== History ==
The club was founded in 1965.

== Colors and badge ==
Its colors are white and light blue.
