= Montbéliard =

- Subprefecture and commune
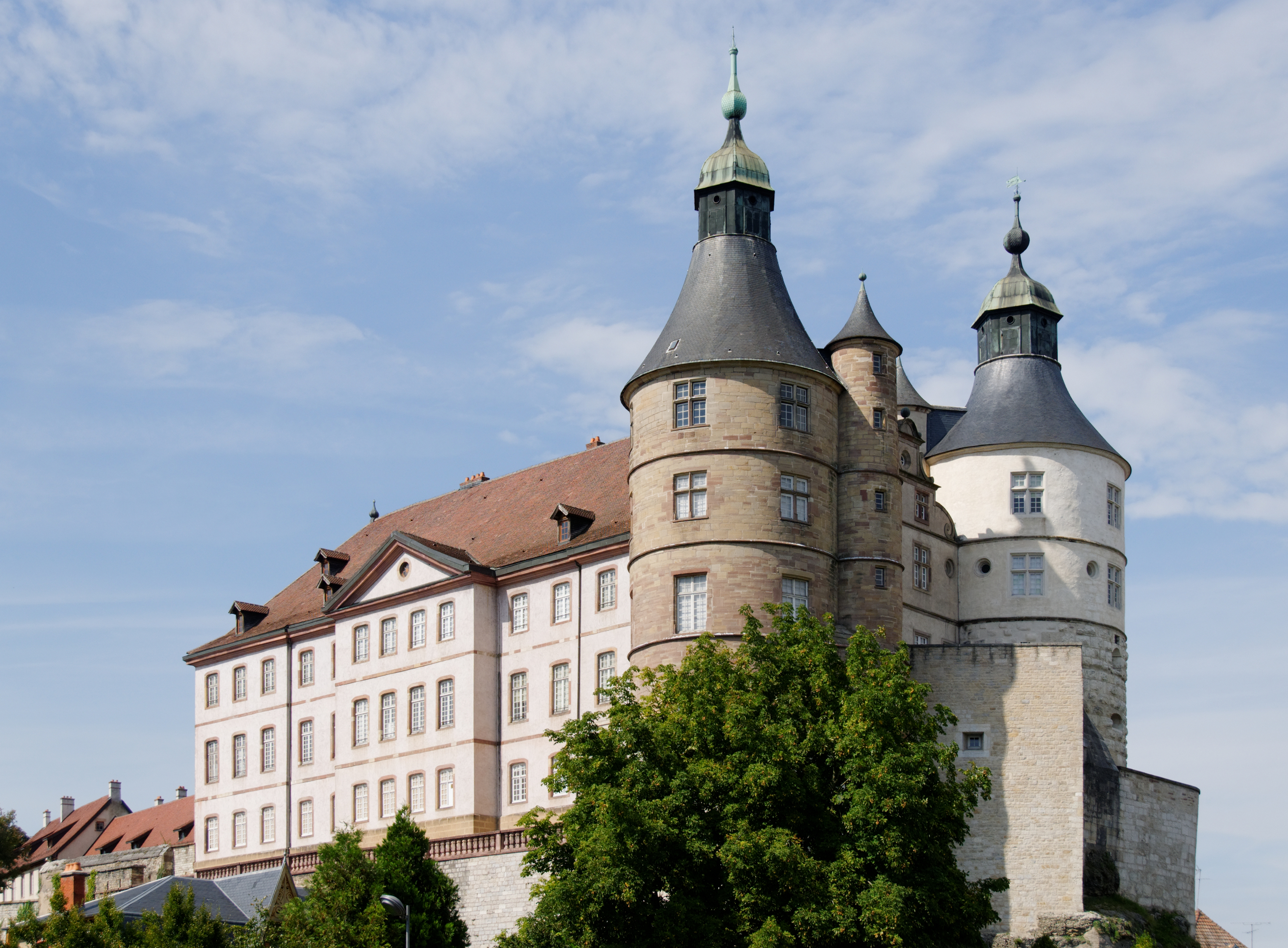
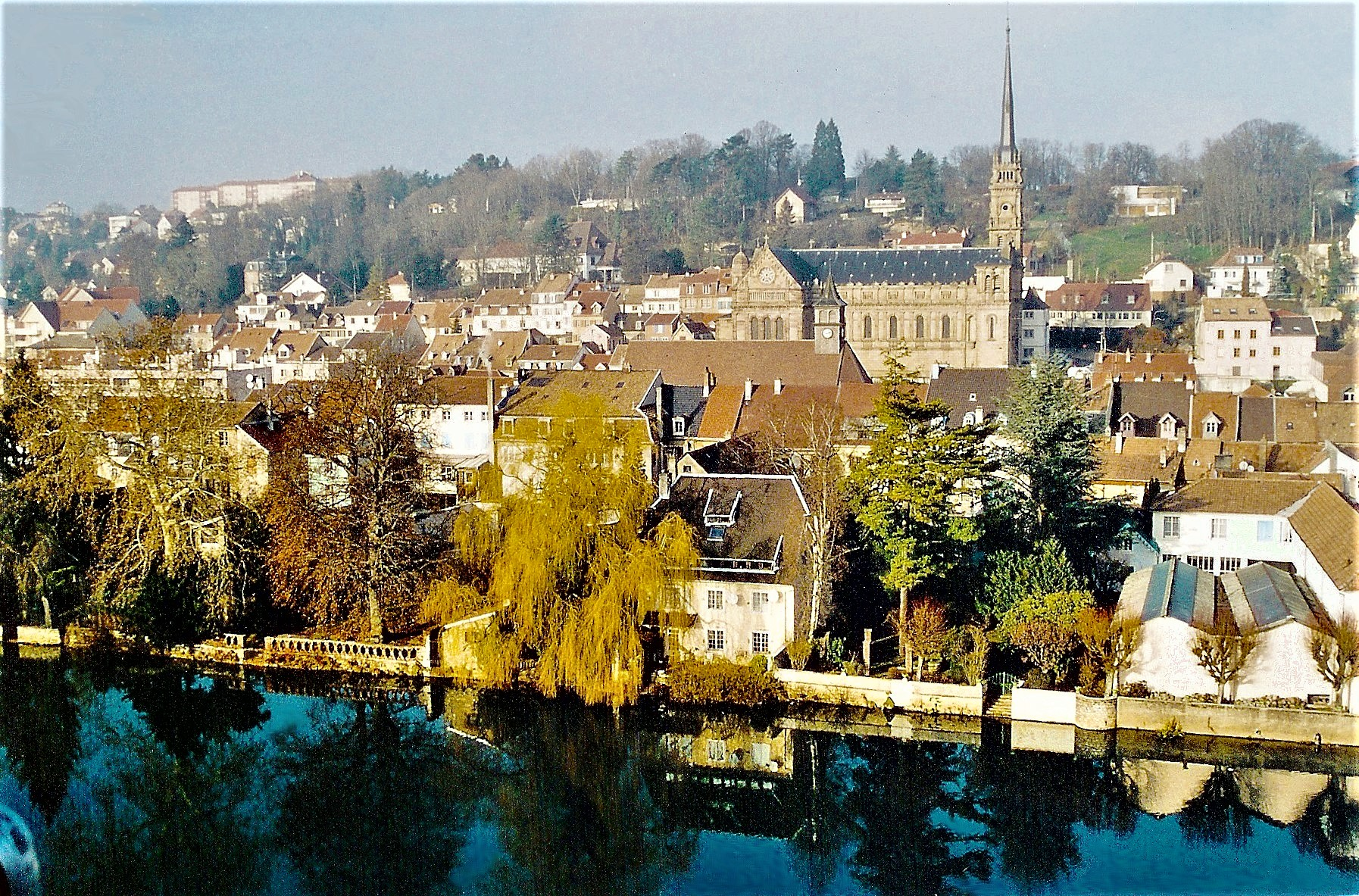
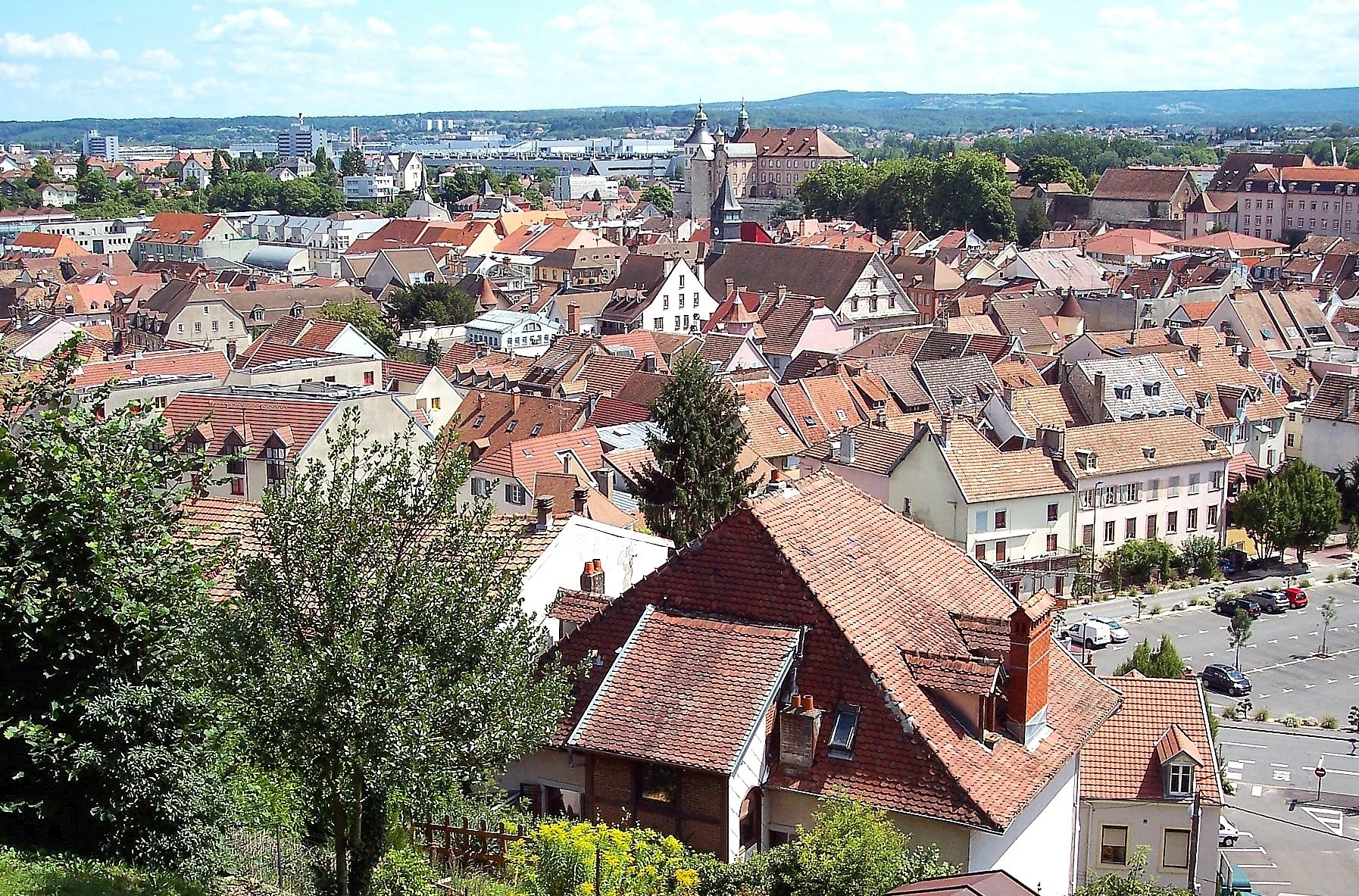
- From top, left to right: Château de Montbéliard, Church of Saint-Maimbœuf, general view of the city center

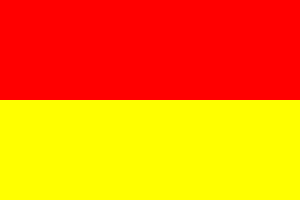
- Flag Coat of arms
- Location of Montbéliard
- Location within France Location within Bourgogne-Franche-Comté
- Coordinates: 47°31′N 6°48′E
- Country: France
- Region: Bourgogne-Franche-Comté
- Department: Doubs
- Arrondissement: Montbéliard
- Canton: Montbéliard
- Intercommunality: Pays de Montbéliard Agglomération

Government
  - Mayor (2020–2026): Marie-Noelle Biguinet
- Area^{1}: 15.01 km^{2} (5.80 sq mi)
- Highest elevation: 454 m (1,490 ft)
- Lowest elevation: 311 m (1,020 ft)
- Population (2023): 24,672
  - Density: 1,644/km^{2} (4,257/sq mi)
- Time zone: UTC+01:00 (CET)
  - Summer (DST): UTC+02:00 (CEST)
- INSEE/Postal code: 25388 /25200
- ^{1} French Land Register data, which excludes lakes, ponds, glaciers > 1 km^{2} (0.386 sq mi or 247 acres) and river estuaries.

Montbéliard (French: [mɔ̃beljaʁ]; traditional German: Mömpelgard) is a town in the Doubs department in the Bourgogne-Franche-Comté region in eastern France, about 13 km (8 mi) from the border with Switzerland. It is one of the two subprefectures of the department.

== History ==
Montbéliard is mentioned as early as 983 as Mons Beliardae. The County of Montbéliard or Mömpelgard was a feudal county of the Holy Roman Empire from 1033 to 1796. In 1283, it was granted rights under charter by Count Reginald. Its charter guaranteed the county perpetual liberties and franchises which lasted until the French Revolution in 1789.

Montbéliard's original municipal institutions included the Magistracy of the Nine Bourgeois, the Corp of the Eighteen and the Notables, a Mayor, and Procurator, and appointed "Chazes", who all participated in the administration of the county as provided by the charter. Also under the 1283 charter, the Count and the people of Montbéliard were required by law to defend Montbéliard, while citizens of Montbéliard were not required to fight in any wars outside of the county. Altogether, the charter lent Montbéliard a democratic air remarkable for its time.

In 1397 the county passed by marriage of Henriette, heiress of the county to Eberhard IV, Count of Württemberg, to the House of Württemberg.

In 1520, Duke Ulrich of Württemberg was ousted from the duchy by the Swabian League, and retreated to Montbéliard, the only territory he still possessed. From there on, Ulrich used Montbéliard as a base of operations to raise troops to retake Württemberg, but, in dire need of funds, he decided to lease Montbéliard to his half-brother George. In 1534, still in need of funds, Ulrich simply sold Montbéliard to Francis I of France, though with the right to repurchase, which Ulrich exercised after his restoration to Württemberg in 1536. Still governing Montbéliard as its count, George attempted to strengthen Lutheranism in the county, eventually succeeding in suppressing the other confessions fully.

From 1598 to 1608, the architect Heinrich Schickhardt built several landmarks in the city, including St. Martin, a castle, a bridge, a college and several hotels.

In 1667, composer Johann Jakob Froberger died in Montbéliard after having lived there for several years in the patronage of the House of Württemberg.

After the French Revolution, Montbéliard was briefly incorporated into the Rauracian Republic. In 1793 the town was annexed to France, which was confirmed in 1796 and by the German Mediatisation of 1806, when Württemberg was compensated with other areas, and became a kingdom.

As a consequence of the former rule under the dukes of Württemberg, it has been for centuries one of the few Protestant enclaves in France. The Württemberg coat of arms from 1495 represents Montbéliard as two jumping fish on a red field.

For details of the local events of the Second World War, see Sochaux.

== Population ==
Montbéliard proper has about 25,000 inhabitants, but it is at the center of a larger urban area (aire d'attraction d'une ville) with a population of 180,000. This urban area covers 137 communes, of which several in the adjacent departments of Haute-Saône (notably Héricourt) and Territoire de Belfort.

Historical population

Year	Pop.	±% p.a.
1793	3,428	—
1800	3,693	+1.07%
1806	3,592	−0.46%
1821	4,485	+1.49%
1831	4,767	+0.61%
1836	5,133	+1.49%
1841	5,789	+2.43%
1846	5,829	+0.14%
1851	6,144	+1.06%
1856	5,852	−0.97%
1861	6,353	+1.66%
1866	6,484	+0.41%
1872	6,509	+0.06%
1876	8,938	+8.25%
1881	8,784	−0.35%
1886	9,531	+1.65%
1891	9,561	+0.06%
1896	9,799	+0.49%
1901	10,034	+0.48%

Year	Pop.	±% p.a.
1906	10,455	+0.83%
1911	10,392	−0.12%
1921	10,063	−0.32%
1926	10,292	+0.45%
1931	12,767	+4.40%
1936	14,217	+2.17%
1946	14,301	+0.06%
1954	17,023	+2.20%
1962	21,699	+3.08%
1968	23,908	+1.63%
1975	30,425	+3.50%
1982	31,836	+0.65%
1990	29,005	−1.16%
1999	27,570	−0.56%
2007	26,392	−0.54%
2012	26,084	−0.23%
2017	25,395	−0.53%
2023	24,672	−0.48%

Source: EHESS and INSEE (1968-2023)

== Administration ==
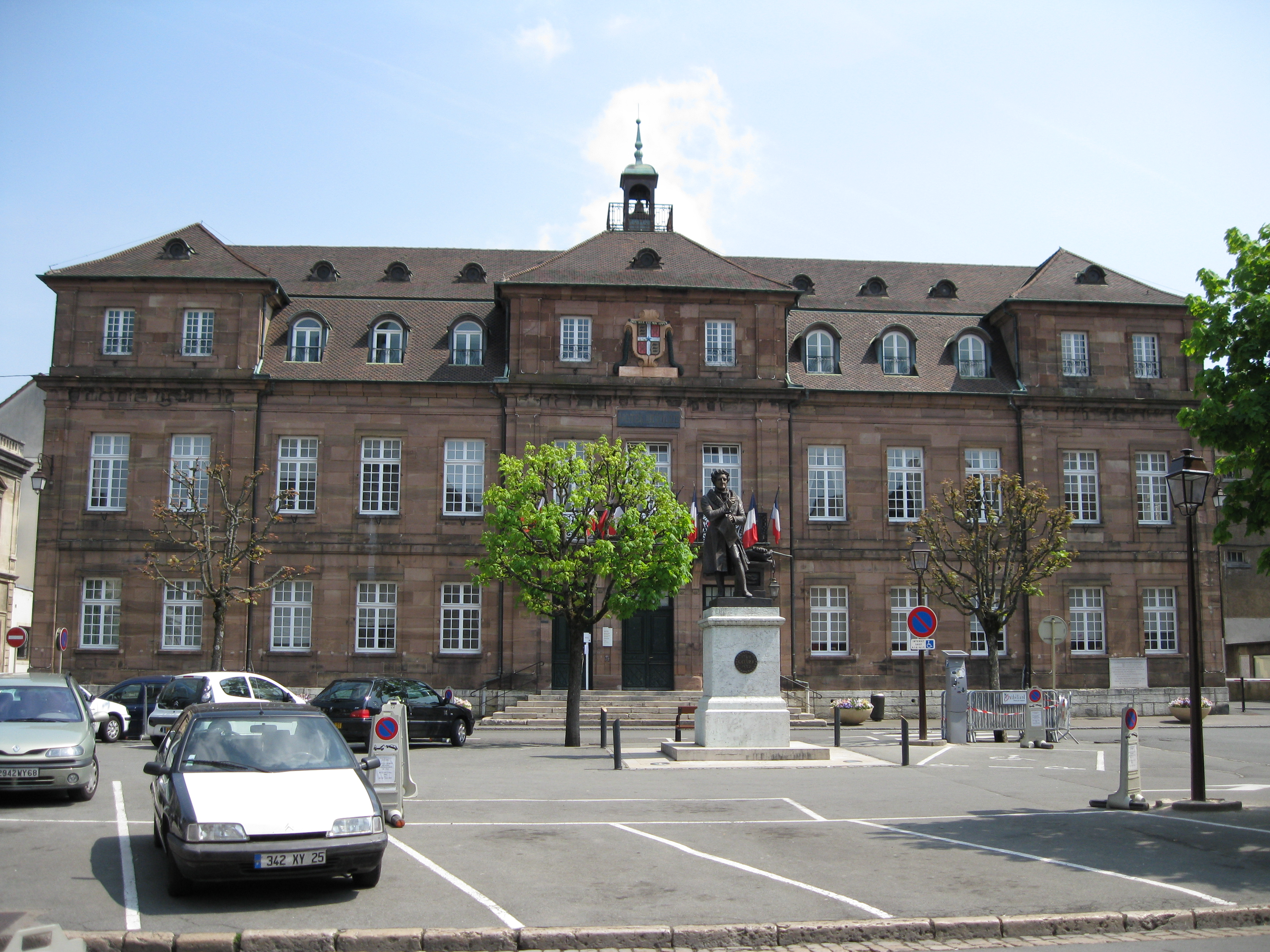
The Hôtel de Ville

The Hôtel de Ville was completed in 1776.

List of mayors
Period	Name	Political party
1947–1957	Lucien Tharradin	RPF
1959–1965	Jean-Pierre Tuefferd	PS
1965–1978	André Boulloche	PS
1978–1989	André Lang	PS
1989–2008	Louis Souvet	UMP
2008–2014	Jacques Hélias	PS
2014–2020	Marie-Noelle Biguinet	UMP
2020–2026	Marie-Noelle Biguinet	LR
The previous data are unknown.

== Economy ==
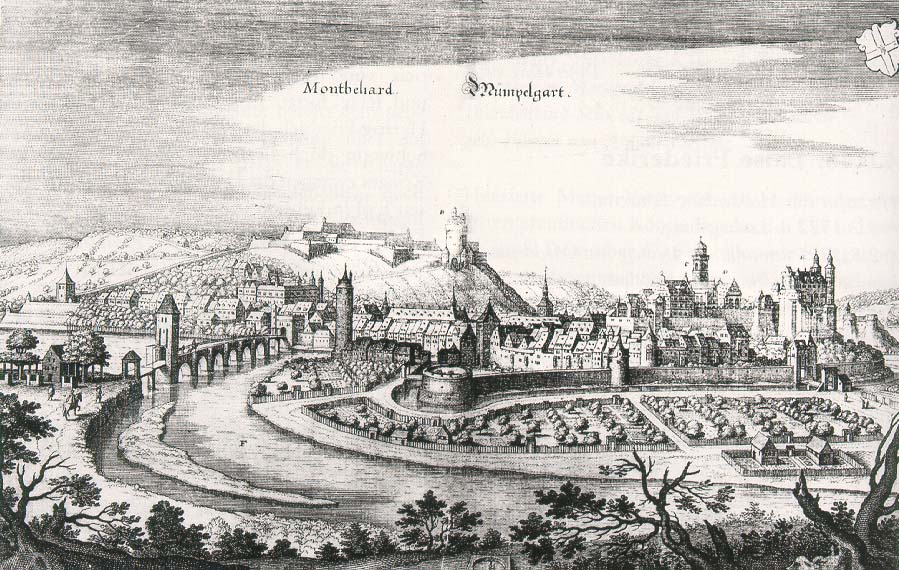
View of Montbéliard – Mümpelgart, c. 1600

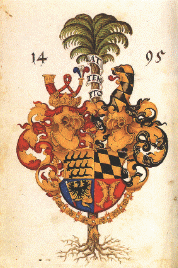
Württemberg coat of arms 1495, showing Montbéliard's fish

Montbéliard and the surrounding region constitute an important manufacturing centre mainly based on metallurgy and the car industry.

The main manufacturing plant of the Peugeot automobile company is partly located in Montbéliard and has around 20,000 employees. In the area, the automotive industry accounts for 34,000 employees in more than 100 companies. The Peugeot company's museum is located in the adjacent commune of Sochaux.

Montbéliard is the centre of the 'Pays de Montbéliard', a metropolitan area of 132,000 inhabitants.

== Main sights ==
- The Château de Montbéliard, the castle of the Dukes of Württemberg.

As the residence of the Counts of Montbéliard, the history of the castle is closely linked with the story of the families that reigned over the county for more than eight centuries. Built on a rocky promontory at the confluence of the Lizaine and Allan valleys, this stronghold, which already existed in the 10th century, was constantly transformed during the course of the centuries. Today, on the northern side of the edifice, one can admire the Henriette Tower (reconstructed by Countess Henriette in approximately 1424), the Frédéric Tower (1572 and 1595) and the main building dating back to the 18th century. The castle has become the Museum of the Castle of the Dukes of Württemberg, which includes a historical tour, an important archaeological department whose collections come mainly from excavations of local Gallo-Roman sites, the Cuvier natural history gallery and exhibits of paintings and sculptures of international renown. On the esplanade of the Castle, the Clock pavilion or Hôtel du Bailli (Bailli's quarters, also known as the gentlemen's quarters), built according to plans of the architect Schickhardt at the beginning of the 17th century, houses today the Academy of Music.

- The Museum of Art and History Beurnier Rossel.

The Beurnier-Rossel mansion, located opposite St. Martin's church, near the Hôtel de Ville, stands as a witness to the lifestyle of the urban bourgeoisie during the 18h and 19th centuries. Today it houses the Museum of Art and History. The restored 18th-century reception rooms on the first floor contain furniture, paintings, chandeliers and draperies which recreate the ambience of a private residence. On the second floor, there is an exhibit of objects relating to the history of the town and local life (bibles, liturgical vessels, traditional headdresses etc.) and the collection of music boxes made by L'Épée is exhibited in the attic.

- Saint-Martin Protestant Church.

Saint Martin Protestant Church was built between 1601 and 1607 and is the work of Heinrich Schickhardt, the architect of Frederic 1st Prince of Montbéliard, in its purest form. It is also the oldest church in France dedicated to the Reformation form of worship.

- Saint Maimboeuf Church.

Built between 1850 and 1875 on the Cardinal Mathieu's request to assert the Catholic reconquest over Lutheranism, Saint Maimboeuf Church dominates the town. It includes rich façade adornments and a polychrome altarpiece.

== Climate ==
Due to its interior position within France, Montbéliard features an oceanic climate (Cfb), bordering on a warm-summer humid continental climate (Dfb), under the Köppen system. This leads to cold, snowy winters and warm to hot, humid summers.

Climate data for Montbéliard, elevation: 318 m (1,043 ft), (1988–2010 normals, extremes 1988–2015)
Month	Jan	Feb	Mar	Apr	May	Jun	Jul	Aug	Sep	Oct	Nov	Dec	Year
Record high °C (°F)	18.4 (65.1)	21.5 (70.7)	25.0 (77.0)	28.5 (83.3)	32.4 (90.3)	35.5 (95.9)	37.1 (98.8)	38.3 (100.9)	32.0 (89.6)	29.9 (85.8)	21.5 (70.7)	20.6 (69.1)	38.3 (100.9)
Mean daily maximum °C (°F)	5.3 (41.5)	7.5 (45.5)	11.5 (52.7)	15.2 (59.4)	20.1 (68.2)	23.3 (73.9)	25.4 (77.7)	25.3 (77.5)	20.3 (68.5)	15.6 (60.1)	9.0 (48.2)	5.3 (41.5)	15.3 (59.6)
Daily mean °C (°F)	2.2 (36.0)	3.5 (38.3)	6.9 (44.4)	10.0 (50.0)	14.7 (58.5)	17.8 (64.0)	19.9 (67.8)	19.6 (67.3)	15.3 (59.5)	11.3 (52.3)	5.7 (42.3)	2.6 (36.7)	10.8 (51.4)
Mean daily minimum °C (°F)	−0.8 (30.6)	−0.4 (31.3)	2.2 (36.0)	4.8 (40.6)	9.3 (48.7)	12.4 (54.3)	14.3 (57.7)	13.9 (57.0)	10.4 (50.7)	6.9 (44.4)	2.5 (36.5)	−0.1 (31.8)	6.3 (43.3)
Record low °C (°F)	−13.5 (7.7)	−15.5 (4.1)	−15.2 (4.6)	−5.1 (22.8)	0.3 (32.5)	3.1 (37.6)	6.9 (44.4)	4.8 (40.6)	0.3 (32.5)	−6.0 (21.2)	−10.3 (13.5)	−17.3 (0.9)	−17.3 (0.9)
Average precipitation mm (inches)	66.5 (2.62)	81.7 (3.22)	87.7 (3.45)	74.5 (2.93)	97.7 (3.85)	90.0 (3.54)	91.0 (3.58)	93.6 (3.69)	94.2 (3.71)	98.9 (3.89)	98.3 (3.87)	105.6 (4.16)	1,079.7 (42.51)
Average precipitation days (≥ 1.0 mm)	10.7	11.2	11.7	10.7	12.6	10.4	11.0	11.3	10.0	11.6	12.2	13.0	136.3
Source: Meteociel

== Sport ==
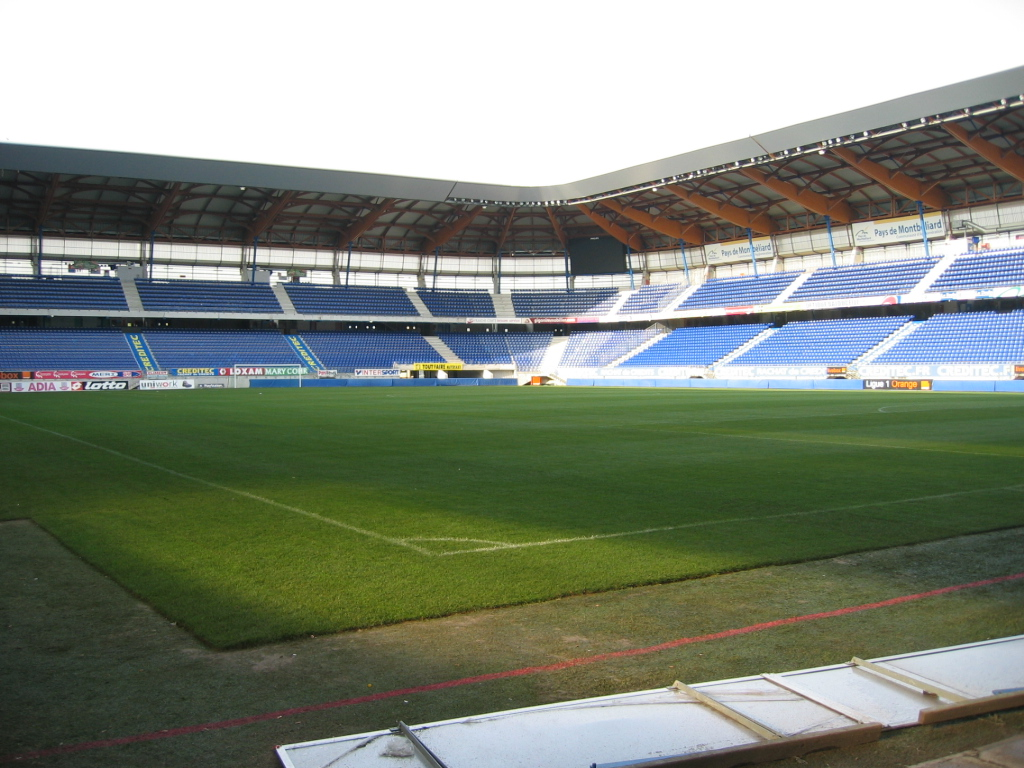
Stade Auguste Bonal

Montbeliard's most popular sports club is FCSM (Football Club Sochaux-Montbéliard). Founded in 1928, FC Sochaux-Montbéliard was a founder member of the French professional Football League. The club has played a record 62 seasons in Ligue 1, the most of any club in the French football league system. This consistency contributed to the fact that FCSM, though a small club, has won all the possible national trophies.

FC Sochaux-Montbéliard honours:

- League Champions of France in 1935 and 1938
- League runners-up in 1937, 1953 and 1980
- Champions of the French Second Division in 1947 and 2001
- French Cup winners in 1937 and 2007
- French Cup runners-up in 1959, 1967 and 1988
- League Cup winners in 2004
- League Cup runners-up in 2003
- Coupe Drago (former French League Cup) winners in 1953, 1963 and 1964
- Seven times UEFA Cup participation, with the best result as semi-finalists in 1980/1981
- Coupe Gambardella (National Youth Cup) winners 1983 and 2007
- Third Division Champions in 1987 (Reserves)

== Transport ==
=== Air ===
Montbéliard – Courcelles Aerodrome is an airfield located 2 km (1.2 mi) south of the town. The nearest airport is EuroAirport Basel Mulhouse Freiburg, which is located 87 km (54 mi) west of Montbéliard.

== Notable people ==
Montbéliard is the birthplace of:

- Nicolaus Taurellus (1547–1606), philosopher and theologian
- Nicolas Tournier (1590-ca. 1638), painter
- Wolf Christoph Zorn von Plobsheim (1655–1721), architect (de:Wolf Christoph Zorn von Plobsheim)
- Georges Frédéric Parrot (1767–1852), First rector of the University of Dorpat, now University of Tartu.
- Georges Cuvier (1769–1832), naturalist and zoologist
- Alexander of Württemberg (1771–1833)
- Frédéric Cuvier (1773–1838), zoologist and physicist
- Henri Mouhot (1826–1861), naturalist
- René Besserve (1883–1959), painter
- François Tuefferd (1912–1996), photographer and curator
- René Thom (1923–2002), mathematician
- Dominique Voynet (1958–present), Green politician
- Frank Darabont (1959–present), American filmmaker
- Adrien Mörk (1979–present), golfer
- Pierre-Alain Frau (1980–present), footballer
- Éric Deloumeaux (1973–present), footballer
- Camel Meriem (1979–present), footballer
- Marc Mauillon (1980–present), tenor and baritone
- Jean-Frédéric Émile Oustalet (1844–1905), ornithologist
- Ousame Sy (1988–present), footballer
- Florin Berenguer-Bohrer (1989–present), footballer
- Big Nose George (1834-1881), made into a pair of shoes

== International relations ==
Montbéliard is twinned with:

- (United States) Greensboro, North Carolina, USA
- Ludwigsburg, Germany
- (United States) St. Charles, Missouri, USA

== See also ==
- Communes of the Doubs department
- Bourgogne-Franche-Comté
- Bleu de Gex
- Montbéliarde, local breed of cattle
