= Juan Fernando Quintero =

Colombian footballer (born 1993)

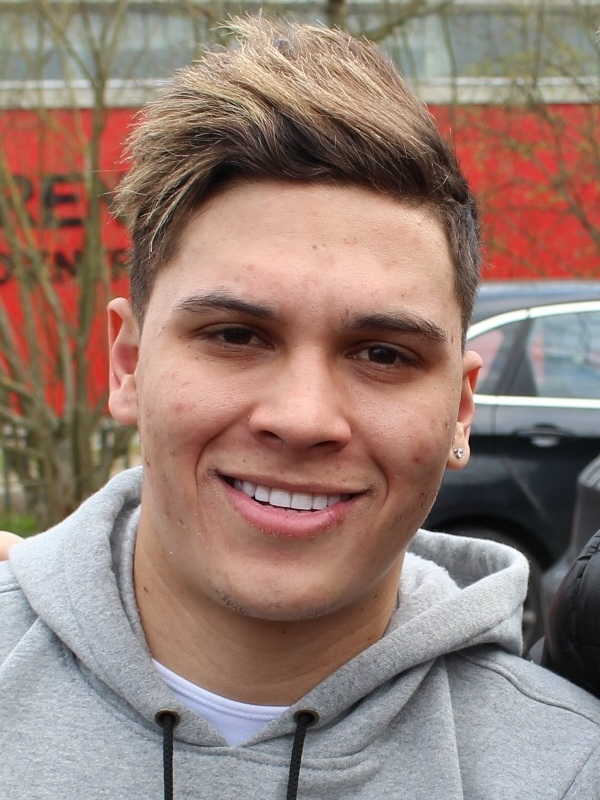
- Quintero with Rennes in 2016

Personal information
- Full name: Juan Fernando Quintero Paniagua
- Date of birth: 18 January 1993 (age 33)
- Place of birth: Medellín, Colombia
- Height: 1.68 m (5 ft 6 in)
- Positions: Attacking midfielder; winger

Team information
- Current team: Independiente Medellín
- Number: 8

Youth career
- 2004–2008: Envigado

Senior career*
Years	Team	Apps	(Gls)
2009–2011	Envigado	43	(5)
2011–2012	Atlético Nacional	15	(2)
2012–2013	Pescara	17	(1)
2013–2019	Porto	42	(6)
2015–2016	→ Rennes (loan)	12	(1)
2017–2018	→ Independiente Medellín (loan)	25	(13)
2018–2019	→ River Plate (loan)	32	(2)
2019–2020	River Plate	21	(6)
2021–2022	Shenzhen FC	21	(1)
2022	River Plate	29	(5)
2023	Atlético Junior	6	(1)
2023–2024	Racing	41	(10)
2025	América de Cali	14	(3)
2025–2026	River Plate	28	(4)
2026–	Independiente Medellín	5	(1)

International career
2013	Colombia U20	13	(8)
2016	Colombia U23	4	(2)
2012–2026	Colombia	53	(6)
Medal record
Men's football
Representing Colombia
Copa América
Runner-up	2024 United States
- * Club domestic league appearances and goals as of 18:09, 4 October 2026 (UTC)

Juan Fernando Quintero Paniagua, better known as Juanfer Quintero (born 18 January 1993), is a Colombian professional footballer who plays as an attacking midfielder or winger for Independiente Medellín. He also played for the Colombia national team.

Quintero first received attention at age 19 due to his performances in the 2013 South American Youth Championship, where Colombia won the title. He was named the tournament's MVP with five goals and four assists; shortly after he was recognized as one of the most promising youth prospects in South America and the world.

After beginning his career in Colombia with Envigado and Atlético Nacional, Quintero moved to Europe with Pescara in 2012 and Porto in 2013, where he won the Supertaça Cândido de Oliveira in 2013. He later spent loan spells with Rennes in France and Independiente Medellín in Colombia. In 2017, he joined River Plate, initially on loan and then permanently, winning the Supercopa Argentina in 2017, the Copa Libertadores in 2018—scoring a decisive extra-time goal in the final against Boca Juniors—and the Copa Argentina in 2019. He moved to China with Shenzhen FC in 2021, before returning to River in 2022. In 2023, he signed for Atlético Junior and later moved to Racing Club, winning the Copa Sudamericana in 2024. In 2025, he joined América de Cali before returning once again to River Plate. However, in July 2026, he left the Argentine club and came back to Independiente Medellín.

At youth level, Quintero won the South American Youth Championship in 2013, where he was named Most Valuable Player, and also took part in the 2013 U-20 World Cup, where he gained more praise for his talents after making a huge impact in the tournament. He made his senior debut for the Colombia in 2012 and went on to represent Colombia in the 2014 World Cup, where he scored his first world cup goal against Ivory Coast. In the 2018 FIFA World Cup he scored against Japan, becoming the first Colombian to score in two FIFA World Cup competitions. He later featured at the 2024 Copa América, helping Colombia reach the final where they finished as runners-up to Argentina.

== Club career ==
=== Envigado ===
Born in Medellín, Colombia, he joined the youth squad for Envigado after an impressive performance during a youth tournament that took place in Medellin. Quintero made his professional debut in 2009.

At the end of the 2010 season, Quintero helped Envigado retain their place in the Categoría Primera A. He scored the only goal of the match in the first leg of the relegation play-offs, a 1–0 victory over Deportivo Pasto . In the second play-off match, he suffered an injury, fracturing his tibia and being ruled out for two months; however, his team won 3–0 on aggregate to secure their spot in the top tier for another season.

=== Atlético Nacional ===
Quintero joined the ranks of Atlético Nacional in January 2012.

=== Loan to Pescara ===
In July 2012, Quintero then joined Serie A club Pescara for a fee of $2 million, wasting no time in impressing European scouts. On 23 September 2012, he scored his first goal with the club, a free kick in a 1–1 draw against Bologna.

It was reported in early 2013 that Inter Milan and Udinese have confirmed their bidding interest, although Udinese was the only club to have made an official bid.

In early April 2013, it was reported that Quintero suffered an injury and would be out for a month. In mid May 2013, Quintero posted on Twitter 'goodbye and thank you' to Pescara, hinting that he was to leave the Italian side in the summer. While Pescara claimed that he had not been 'sold', it hinted at Quintero's desire to leave the club overall.

=== Porto ===
In June 2013, Quintero joined Porto from Pescara for €5 million, with the Italian club retaining 50% of the economic rights. Quintero signed a four-year contract with a release clause of €40 million. By joining Porto, he linked up with fellow countryman Jackson Martínez.

Quintero made his first full debut appearance in the 2013 Emirates Cup against Napoli. He assisted Porto's first goal.

==== 2013–14 season ====
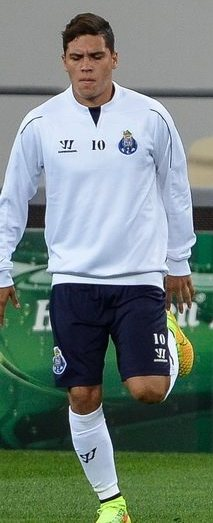
Quintero training with Porto in 2014

Quintero's first official match with Porto was in the 2013 Supertaça Cândido de Oliveira, where he came on as a substitute after 76 minutes, with Porto winning 3–0. Porto went on to win the match, thus giving Quintero his very first silverware not only in Europe, but in his club career.

Quintero debuted in his first league match for the club against Vitória de Setúbal, coming on as a substitute and scoring less than a minute later. Quintero provided his first assist for the club two weeks later against Pacos Ferreira in a 1–0 victory. In a match against Vitória de Guimarães, Quintero drew a penalty that was successfully converted, thus granting him an assist in a 1–0 home victory. In a match against Arouca, Quintero came on in the 90th minute and was subsequently fouled near the box. He then converted an impressive free kick goal, just seconds after coming in.

In late October, Quintero suffered a hamstring injury, expecting to be out for a month. Following his return in December, Quintero requested to play with the B-squad in order to keep his fitness up if he was not able to get guarantee minutes with the A-squad.

After a long period of matches spent solely on the bench, or coming on as a late substitute during Paulo Fonseca's time as manager, averaging around 20 minutes per game in the league, Quintero found his way back into the team after new manager Luís Castro took over in March 2014. Quintero's next significant performance was against Napoli in the Europa League, where he came close to scoring his first goal in European competition, when a Napoli defender's clearance rebounded off his leg and hit the post.

Quintero scored his third goal of the season against Belenenses, coming on as a half-time substitute and setting up several opportunities for teammate and fellow countryman Jackson Martínez, but eventually it would be Quintero who decided the game with the only goal in a 1–0 victory.

Quintero made his first 90-minute appearance for Porto on 6 April 2014, in a home match against Académica. He provided somewhat of an assist, again for Jackson Martínez, when he was fouled in the box in the 38th minute, which resulted in a converted Jackson Martínez penalty. Quintero then scored his fourth goal of the season a week later, in the 91st minute in a 3–1 victory over S.C. Braga, after a counterattack which he started.

On 21 April, Quintero came on as a second-half substitute against fellow northerners Rio Ave and made a significant impact on the match. He was involved in all three of the goals, but only got one direct assist. A chipped through ball to Jackson Martínez resulted in him being brought down for a penalty, which Martínez scored. Next, he assisted Héctor Herrera's header with a chipped through ball. The third goal of the game came from Porto right back Danilo, who scored a deflected free kick after Quintero had been fouled just outside the box.

==== 2014–15 season ====
Quintero missed Porto's first league game of the season due to a death in his family, but returned to the Porto squad for the next league match versus Paços de Ferreira. Coming on for the injured Cristian Tello, he provided an assist, yet again for fellow Colombian Jackson Martínez, for the only goal in a 1–0 victory for Porto.

Quintero scored his first goal of the season against F.C. Arouca from long distance, Porto ended up winning 0–5.

On 16 December 2014, Porto purchased the remaining 50% economic rights of Quintero from Pescara for €4.5 million, giving them complete ownership of him.

==== 2015–16 ====
In August 2015, Quintero signed a season-long loan with Ligue 1 side Rennes. Quintero made his debut against Nice, coming on as a sub and providing an assist in a 1–4 loss. Quintero would eventually score his first goal for the club in the match against SM Caen, resulting in a 1–1 draw.

Quintero stated in an interview that he intended to return to Porto after his loan ended, despite rumours linking him to a permanent transfer.

==== 2016 ====
On 18 September 2016, Quintero returned to the top flight Colombian league on loan, joining Independiente Medellín from Porto on a one-year contract. On 9 August 2017, his loan was extended through December 2017.

==== Loan to River Plate ====
On 24 January 2018, Quintero joined Argentine club River Plate on loan for one year and got the number 8. The deal was settled for €300,000 and included a buyout clause of €5 million. On 9 December 2018, in the second leg of the 2018 Copa Libertadores finals against rivals Boca Juniors, Quintero scored a goal in extra time from outside the box to put River Plate up 2–1, then assisted Pity Martinez in the 120th minute to seal the game at 3–1 and earn River Plate their fourth Copa Libertadores. He later got a tattoo on his calf for this occasion in January 2019. That same month, he announced that he would continue with River for the 2019 season, putting to rest any rumors surrounding a potential move to China, and praising coach Marcelo Gallardo, saying he was "like a father to me".

=== River Plate ===
==== 2019 ====
River Plate made the transfer for Quintero for a fee of €3.5 million. After the departure of Pity Martinez to the MLS, Quintero took the number 10 jersey. In February 2019, he renewed his contract until June 2022 and included a buyout clause of €30 million. In August 2019, he was nominated for the 2019 FIFA Puskás Award for his goal scored against Racing Club. His goal eventually finished third, behind second place Lionel Messi, and winner Dániel Zsóri.

=== Shenzhen FC ===
In late 2020, Quintero signed for Chinese Super League club Shenzhen FC for a reported fee of €5.9 million. He joined the team on 1 March 2021.

=== River Plate ===
==== 2022 ====
On 21 January 2022, Quintero returned to River Plate, joining the club permanently and signing a 2-year contract.

In October, he made international news for pushing a referee and earning a red card in a defeat.

=== Atlético Junior ===
On 13 January 2023, Quintero joined Colombian side Junior, on a one-year contract. He would become the highest paid player in the history of Colombian football, earning a €2.3 million annual salary. A mix of injuries and playing time disagreements with coach Hernán Darío Gómez, led to Quintero rescinding his contract with the Barranquilla club.

=== Racing ===
On 17 August 2023, Quintero returned to Argentina, joining Racing as a free agent on a two-year contract. He scored his first goal in a 1–2 victory against Tigre, where he also assisted the other goal. On October 31, he shone by scoring two goals against Corinthians, in the semifinals of the Copa Sudamericana, securing his team's qualification for an international final after 32 years. In that competition, he was crowned champion after his team defeated Cruzeiro by 3–1 in the final.

=== América De Cali ===
On 24 January 2025, Quintero returned to Colombia to play for América de Cali. After the Colombian Apertura season was over, Quintero decided to leave the club.

=== River Plate ===
On 17 July 2025, Quintero joined River Plate.

== International career ==
=== Youth ===
==== 2013 South American Youth Championship ====
Quintero was called to represent Colombia wearing the number 10 jersey at the 2013 South American Youth Championship. In the first match against Paraguay, he was voted man of the match after an impressive display setting up the 1–0 victory goal. In the match against a powerful Chile team, Quintero scored a penalty although Colombia lost 2–1. In the match against Bolivia, Quintero assisted four of the six goals in a 6–0 victory. In the final group stage match against Argentina, Colombia had already qualified thus he did not play until the second half where he scored with an amazing 50 yard free kick despite losing the match 2–3.

In the first match of the final round, Quintero scored again from an impressive distance in a 2–1 victory over Ecuador. This brought his goal tally to three and his assist tally to four. Quintero scored with a penalty against Peru in a 1–0 allowing Colombia to qualify for the 2013 FIFA U-20 World Cup in Turkey. In the final match against Paraguay who were also Colombia's very first opponent in the U20 South American Youth Championships, he scored a goal in a 2–1 victory where Colombia won the Youth Championships in South America for the third time. In total, Quintero had scored 5 goals and assisted 4, making him MVP of the championship for contributing more than any other player in the tournament.

Quintero was set to join the U20 squad again for the 2013 Toulon Tournament, but Pescara refused to allow him to join his call-up. Prior to the U-20 World Cup, Quintero scored with an impressive free kick in a friendly against the U-20 squad of France.

==== 2013 U-20 FIFA World Cup ====
"It's difficult to judge a player at this age and know if he'll have a great career, but sometimes it's just blindingly obvious when you get to see a future star. Juan Quintero has got something extra and you can already see that, despite his young age."

— Australian U-20 coach, Paul Okon praising Quintero following a 1–1 draw against Colombia in the U-20 FIFA World Cup.

Quintero played an entertaining opening match performance of the U-20 FIFA World Cup that was held in Turkey. He made impressive shots with his free kicks as well as creating impressive chances. He set up Colombia's goal in the 78th minute where the game ended 1–1. In the match against host nation Turkey, Quintero scored a wonderful goal from outside the box (20 yards), winning the game 1–0 and allowing Colombia to top the group. In the last group match against El Salvador, Quintero assisted the first goal and sealed the victory with an amazing 25 yard goal, allowing Colombia to win 3–0 and win the group. Quintero then played in the next match against South Korea, and managed to save Colombia into extra time with an impressive free kick in the last few seconds of full-time. However, Colombia went on to lose on penalties, where he scored one in a 7–8 loss. Despite Colombia failing to progress, Quintero was praised as the best player in the group stages.

His goal against El Salvador was later voted as the best goal of the tournament.

=== Olympics Squad ===
Quintero expressed great interest in representing Colombia in 2016 for the Olympics in Brazil.

In February 2016, Quintero was called up to play back-to-back friendlies against Honduras. He made his debut in the first match, resulting in a 1–1 draw. Days later in the second match, he scored with a free kick in a 2–2 draw.

=== Senior ===
In 2012, Quintero was called up for the 2014 FIFA World Cup qualifiers against Peru and Ecuador, without making an appearance. He made his international debut in a friendly match against Cameroon later in the same year.

==== 2014 World Cup and Friendlies ====
On 2 June 2014, Quintero was named in Colombia's 23-man squad for the 2014 FIFA World Cup and assigned the number 20 shirt. He made his World Cup debut against Ivory Coast in the group stage, coming on for Victor Ibarbo in the 53rd minute, and scored his first international goal to give the 2–1 win for Los Cafeteros.

In May 2018, in a friendly against France at the Parc des Princes, Quintero scored the winning goal for Colombia, a penalty, in a 3–2 victory.

==== 2018 World Cup ====
In May 2018, he was named in Colombia's preliminary 35 man squad for the 2018 World Cup in Russia. On 19 June 2018, he scored in the opening game against Japan with a free kick under the wall to tie the match 1–1 that ended in a 2–1 defeat. On 24 June 2018, Quintero played 73 minutes in Colombia's 3–0 victory over Poland and assisted Radamel Falcao's goal. Four days later on 28 June 2018, he played 90 minutes of Colombia's final game in the group stage against Senegal and provided the winning assist to Yerry Mina's goal off a corner kick to secure first place in Group H. On 3 July 2018, he played 88 minutes in the round of 16 game against England, as Colombia lost on penalties. His goal against Japan was voted the second best goal of the tournament, after Benjamin Pavard's goal against Argentina.

==== 2026 World Cup ====
Quintero was included in the national squad for the 2026 World Cup. Following Colombia's elimination, Quintero announced his retirement from the selection.

== Style of play ==
"Colombia’s Juan Quintero was exceptional. He could go on to become a player on a par with Lionel Messi. The composure he displayed was unbelievable for such a young player. Without a doubt he will go on to become one of the stars of the game."

— Former footballer Kubilay Türkyilmaz's view on Quintero from the 2013 U-20 FIFA World Cup.

Quintero is known for his playmaking, unpredictable creativity, and ball control. He is also known for his powerful long range shot and set-pieces, and he has used this ability to deliver precise crosses, passes, and score many free-kicks throughout his career.

Due to his small stature, Quintero naturally has a lower center of gravity, allowing him to have higher balance and agility, similar to that of Lionel Messi and Diego Maradona. However, Quintero does not possess the quickness and balanced weak foot that the aforementioned players had; and at times Quintero has been criticized for being overweight. His lack of quickness has also drawn comparisons to James Rodríguez, due to the fact that they have lacked pace throughout their careers and both play in the #10 role.

Quintero states that as a child his main inspiration was Brazilian legend Rivaldo.

== Career statistics ==
=== Club ===
As of match played 24 May 2026

Appearances and goals by club, season and competition
Club	Season	League			National cup		League cup		Continental (Note: Includes Copa Libertadores, Copa Sudamericana, UEFA Champions League and UEFA Europa League)		Other (Note: Includes Supertaça Cândido de Oliveira, Torneos de Verano and Superliga Colombiana)		Total	
Club	Season	Division	Apps	Goals	Apps	Goals	Apps	Goals	Apps	Goals	Apps	Goals	Apps	Goals
Envigado	2009	Liga DIMAYOR	11	1	0	0	—		—		—		11	1
Envigado	2010	Liga DIMAYOR	18	3	0	0	—		—		—		18	3
Envigado	2011	Liga DIMAYOR	14	1	2	0	—		—		—		16	1
Envigado	Total		43	5	2	0	—		—		—		45	5
Atlético Nacional	2012	Liga DIMAYOR	15	2	6	2	—		7	0	—		28	4
Pescara	2012–13	Serie A	17	1	0	0	—		—		—		17	1
Porto	2013–14	Primeira Liga	22	4	4	0	2	0	6	0	1	0	34	4
Porto	2014–15	Primeira Liga	20	2	1	0	4	1	5	0	—		30	3
Porto	Total		42	6	5	0	6	1	11	0	1	0	64	7
Rennes (loan)	2015–16	Ligue 1	12	1	1	0	1	0	—		—		13	1
Independiente Medellín (loan)	2017	Liga DIMAYOR	25	13	4	1	—		5	2	2	0	36	16
River Plate (loan)	2017–18	AFA Liga Profesional de Fútbol	13	1	0	0	—		12	2	2	0	27	3
River Plate (loan)	2018–19	AFA Liga Profesional de Fútbol	16	6	1	2	—		2	0	1	1	20	9
River Plate	2019–20	AFA Liga Profesional de Fútbol	12	1	2	0	—		1	0	1	0	16	1
River Plate	Total		41	8	3	2	—		15	2	4	1	63	13
Shenzhen	2021	Chinese Super League	21	1	0	0	—		—		—		21	1
River Plate	2022	AFA Liga Profesional de Fútbol	29	5	3	0	—		4	0	—		36	5
Junior	2023	Liga DIMAYOR	6	1	0	0	—		1	0	—		9	3
Racing	2023	AFA Liga Profesional de Fútbol	14	5	0	0	—		2	0	—		16	5
Racing	2024	AFA Liga Profesional de Fútbol	27	5	1	0	—		10	3	—		38	8
Racing	Total		41	10	1	0	—		12	3	—		54	13
América de Cali	2025	Liga DIMAYOR	14	3	0	0	—		7	0	—		21	3
River Plate	2025	AFA Liga Profesional de Fútbol	13	1	4	0	—		4	0	—		21	1
River Plate	2026	AFA Liga Profesional de Fútbol	15	3	1	1	—		3	0	—		19	4
River Plate	Total		28	4	5	1	—		7	0	—		40	5
Career total			334	60	30	6	9	3	62	7	7	1	446	77

=== International ===
Appearances and goals by national team and year
National team	Year	Apps	Goals
Colombia	2012	1	0
Colombia	2013	2	0
Colombia	2014	8	1
Colombia	2015	2	0
Colombia	2016	0	0
Colombia	2017	0	0
Colombia	2018	10	2
Colombia	2019	0	0
Colombia	2020	0	0
Colombia	2021	5	0
Colombia	2022	3	1
Colombia	2023	0	0
Colombia	2024	10	1
Colombia	2025	4	1
Colombia	2026	8	0
Total		53	6

Scores and results list Colombia's goal tally first.

List of international goals scored by Juan Fernando Quintero
No.	Date	Venue	Opponent	Score	Final	Competition
1.	19 June 2014	Estádio Nacional Mané Garrincha, Brasília, Brazil	Ivory Coast	2–0	2–1	2014 FIFA World Cup
2.	23 March 2018	Stade de France, Saint-Denis, France	France	3–2	3–2	Friendly
3.	19 June 2018	Mordovia Arena, Saransk, Russia	Japan	1–1	1–2	2018 FIFA World Cup
4.	16 January 2022	DRV PNK Stadium, Fort Lauderdale, United States	Honduras	1–0	2–1	Friendly
5.	15 November 2024	Estadio Centenario, Montevideo, Uruguay	Uruguay	1–0	2–3	2026 FIFA World Cup qualification
6.	4 September 2025	Estadio Metropolitano Roberto Meléndez, Barranquilla, Colombia	Bolivia	3–0	3–0	2026 FIFA World Cup qualification

== Honours ==
Porto

- Supertaça Cândido de Oliveira: 2013

River Plate

- Supercopa Argentina: 2017
- Copa Libertadores: 2018
- Recopa Sudamericana: 2019
- Copa Argentina: 2019

Racing Club

- Copa Sudamericana: 2024

Colombia U20

- South American Youth Championship: 2013

Colombia

- Copa América runner-up: 2024

Individual

- 2013 South American Youth Championship MVP
- 2013 FIFA U-20 World Cup Best goal of the tournament.
- Copa Sudamericana Team of the Tournament: 2024
- South America Team of the Year: 2018, 2024
