= Damiano Zanon =

Italian footballer (born 1983)

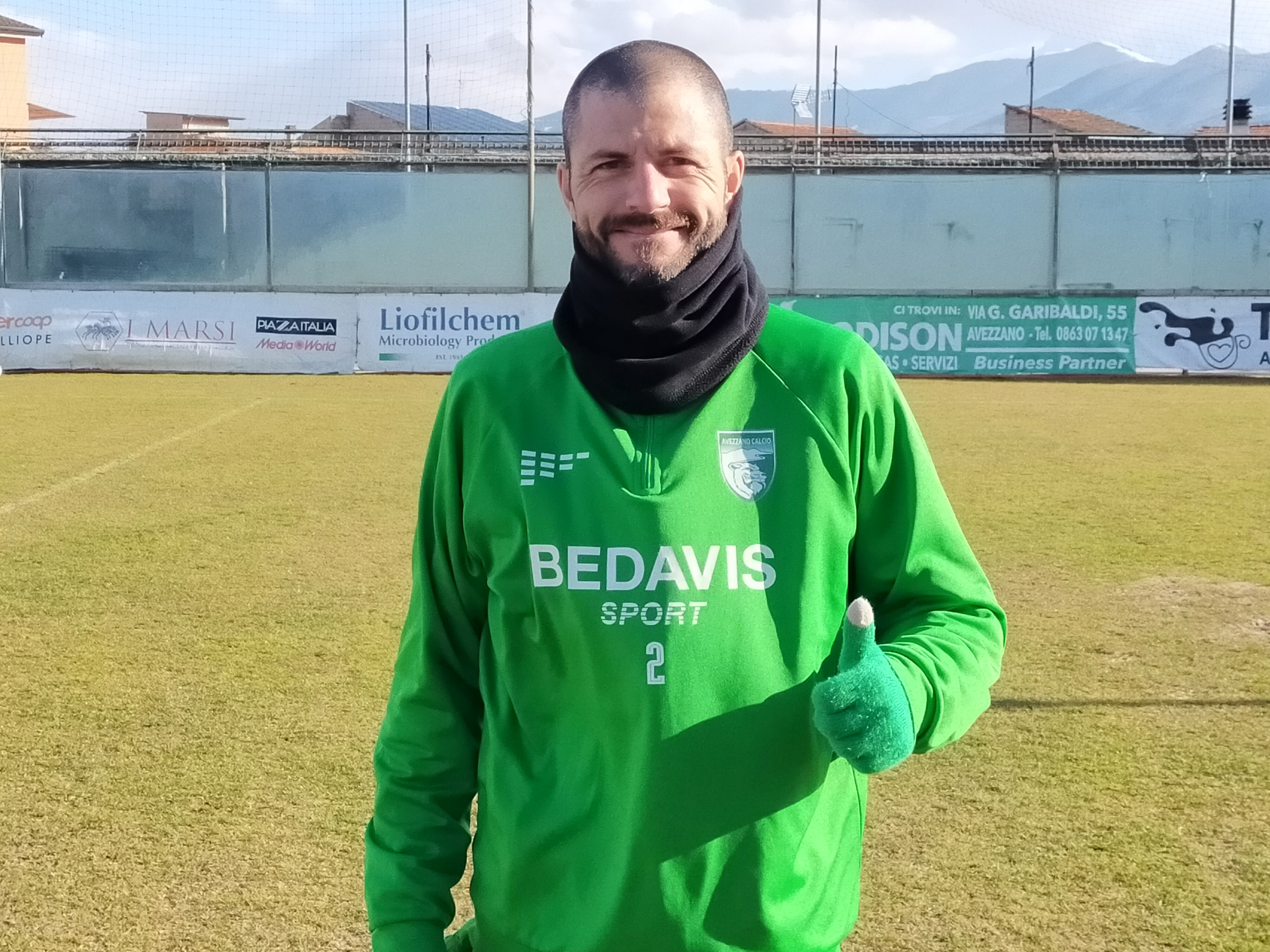
- Damiano Zanon in 2022

Personal information
- Full name: Damiano Zanon
- Date of birth: 9 February 1983 (age 43)
- Place of birth: L'Aquila, Italy
- Height: 1.80 m (5 ft 11 in)
- Position: Defender

Senior career*
Years	Team	Apps	(Gls)
1999–2001	Giulianova	3	(0)
2001–2002	Castrovillari	1	(0)
2002–2009	Celano	155	(5)
2007	→ Cisco Roma (loan)	12	(0)
2009–2013	Pescara	118	(0)
2013–2014	Benevento	16	(0)
2014	→ Bari (loan)	13	(0)
2014–2015	Frosinone	31	(0)
2015–2017	Ternana	72	(0)
2017–2018	Perugia	20	(0)
- * Club domestic league appearances and goals as of 18:22, 7 August 2018 (UTC)

Damiano Zanon (born 9 February 1983) is an Italian footballer who plays as a defender. He played over 250 league matches for both Italian clubs, Celano and Pescara.
