= Rômulo Togni =

Brazilian footballer and manager

Personal information
- Full name: Eugênio Rômulo Togni
- Date of birth: 9 September 1982 (age 44)
- Place of birth: São Leopoldo, Brazil
- Height: 1.83 m (6 ft 0 in)
- Position: Midfielder

Team information
- Current team: Athletic Carpi (head coach)

Senior career*
Years	Team	Apps	(Gls)
2002–2003	Bellunoponte	23	(3)
2003–2007	Manfredonia	96	(7)
2007–2010	Arezzo	74	(5)
2010–2011	Sorrento	35	(7)
2011–2013	Pescara	38	(3)
2013–2016	Avellino	13	(0)
2014–2015	→ SPAL (loan)	30	(3)
2016	Maceratese	13	(0)
2016–2017	Cuneo	31	(2)
2017	Mezzolara	15	(0)

Managerial career
- 2018: Mezzolara (assistant)
- 2018–2021: Mezzolara
- 2021–: Athletic Carpi
- * Club domestic league appearances and goals

Eugênio Rômulo Togni (born 9 September 1982) is a Brazilian football coach and a former player. He is currently the head coach of Italian Serie D club Athletic Carpi.

== Playing career ==
Togni joined his first Italy side Bellunoponte in September 2002. In 2003–04 season, he joined Manfredonia, also at Serie D, where he won the champion. He followed Manfredonia to play at Serie C2 and won champion again in 2005. He played at Serie C1 until joined Serie B side Arezzo in January 2007 but relegated to Serie C1 in June 2007. On 12 July 2010, he was signed by Sorrento on a free transfer.

== Coaching career ==
After retiring as a player in December 2017, Togni stayed on at Serie D club Mezzolara as an assistant coach. On 31 May 2018 he was promoted as head coach.

In June 2021, Togni left Mezzolara after three seasons in charge of the club.

On 14 December 2021, he was hired as the new head coach of ambitious Serie D club Athletic Carpi, unofficial heir of the defunct Carpi club.

== Honours ==
- Serie B: 2012
- Serie C2: 2005
- Serie D: 2003, 2004
