= Ousmane Sy (footballer) =

Senegalese-French footballer (born 1988)

Ousmane Sy (born 18 February 1988, in Montbéliard) is a French former professional footballer who played as a forward and made 12 appearances for Serie B club Reggina Calcio in the 2010–11 season.
