= Lucas Chiaretti =

Brazilian footballer (born 1987)

Personal information
- Full name: Lucas Chiaretti Cossenzo
- Date of birth: September 22, 1987 (age 39)
- Place of birth: Belo Horizonte, Brazil
- Height: 1.71 m (5 ft 7 1/2 in)
- Position: Winger

Youth career
- Cruzeiro

Senior career*
Years	Team	Apps	(Gls)
2006–2007	Cruzeiro		
2006	→ Gamba Osaka (loan)		
2008–2009	Cabofriense		
2009	Resende	1	(0)
2009–2011	Andria BAT	27	(1)
2011–2012	Taranto	40	(8)
2012–2014	Pescara	0	(0)
2015	Bragantino		
2015–2018	Cittadella	101	(17)
2018–2019	Foggia	20	(2)
2019–2020	Pordenone	16	(2)
- * Club domestic league appearances and goals as of 31 July 2020

Lucas Chiaretti Cossenzo (born September 22, 1987) is a Brazilian football player.

== Club career ==
Chiaretti spent five years of his career in Italy. He arrived in December 2009 signing for Lega Pro Prima Divisione side A.S. Andria BAT (31 caps, 2 goals). In January 2011 he moved to A.S. Taranto Calcio (41 caps, 8 goals). For the 2012–13 season he signed for Serie A side Delfino Pescara 1936, but he only played one match of Coppa Italia in two seasons. At the end of the 2013–14 season he became freeagent.

In February 2015, he signed with the Brazilian Série B side Clube Atlético Bragantino.

On 5 October 2020, his contract with Pordenone was terminated by mutual consent.
