= Daniele Sciarra =

Italian footballer (born 1991)

Personal information
- Full name: Daniele Sciarra
- Date of birth: 12 July 1991 (age 35)
- Place of birth: Atri, Italy
- Height: 1.85 m (6 ft 1 in)
- Position: Forward

Team information
- Current team: Chieti (on loan from Pescara)

Senior career*
Years	Team	Apps	(Gls)
2010–2011	Aversa Normanna	2	(0)
2011	→ Barletta (loan)	1	(0)
2011–	Pescara	0	(0)
2012–	→ Chieti (loan)	7	(0)
- * Club domestic league appearances and goals as of 20 May 2012

Daniele Sciarra (born 12 July 1991) is an Italian footballer who plays as a forward for Chieti on loan from Serie B side Pescara.
