= Enrico Pezzi (footballer) =

Italian footballer (born 1989)

Personal information
- Date of birth: 24 September 1989 (age 37)
- Place of birth: Rimini, Italy
- Height: 1.80 m (5 ft 11 in)
- Position: Defender

Team information
- Current team: Fratta Terme

Senior career*
Years	Team	Apps	(Gls)
2008–2009	Rimini	2	(0)
2009–2010	Bellaria Igea Marina	32	(1)
2010–2011	Lucchese	30	(2)
2011–2012	Triestina	13	(0)
2012	Pavia	16	(0)
2012–2014	Pontedera	50	(1)
2014–2017	Benevento	85	(3)
2017–2018	Cittadella	17	(0)
2018–2020	Carpi	47	(0)
2020–2021	Vis Pesaro	13	(1)
2021	→ Pistoiese (loan)	15	(0)
2021–2022	Forlì	28	(0)
2022	Tre Fiori	0	(0)
2022	Francavilla	13	(0)
2022–2023	Notaresco	16	(0)
2023–2024	Real Casalnuovo	27	(1)
2024	La Fiorita	0	(0)
2024–2025	Sarnese	20	(0)
2025	San Marino	1	(0)
2025–	Fratta Terme		
- * Club domestic league appearances and goals as of 23 November 2025

Enrico Pezzi (born 24 September 1989) is an Italian footballer who plays for Eccellenza club Fratta Terme.

== Club career ==
On 9 August 2018, he signed a two-year contract with Serie B club Carpi.

On 16 August 2020 he moved to Vis Pesaro. On 4 January 2021, he was loaned by Pistoiese.

On 8 September 2021 he joined Forlì in Serie D.

In the summers of 2022 and 2024 he played for Sammarinese clubs Tre Fiori and La Fiorita in the UEFA Conference League qualifiers, returning to Italy both times after their elimination.
