= Francesco Cattenari =

Italian footballer

Personal information
- Full name: Francesco Cattenari
- Date of birth: 17 January 1990 (age 36)
- Place of birth: Sora, Italy
- Position: Goalkeeper

Team information
- Current team: Avezzano Calcio

Youth career
- Pescara

Senior career*
| Years | Team | Apps | (Gls) |
| 2011–2012 | Pescara | 1 | (0) |
| 2012–2014 | Campobasso | 18 | (0) |
| 2014–2015 | US San Salvo | 31 | (0) |
| 2015–2016 | Pineto | 0 | (0) |
| 2016–2017 | Renato Curi Angolana | ? | (?) |
| 2017 | Chieti FC | 0 | (0) |
| 2017-2018 | Pontevomano Calcio | ? | (?) |
| 2018– | Castelnuovo Vomano Calcio | ? | (?) |
| 2019– | Real Giulianova | ? | (?) |
| 2020– | Avezzano | ? | (?) |
- * Club domestic league appearances and goals as of 4 March 2018

Francesco Cattenari (born 17 January 1990) is an Italian footballer who plays as a goalkeeper for Avezzano Calcio.

In summer 2012 he was sold to Campobasso in a co-ownership deal. In June 2013 Pescara gave up the remain 50% registration rights of the player to Campobasso.
