= David Mbodj =

Senegalese footballer

Personal information
- Full name: David Abdallah Mbodj Mbaye
- Date of birth: 15 September 1994 (age 32)
- Place of birth: Senegal
- Position: Defender

Team information
- Current team: F.C. Aprilia

Senior career*
Years	Team	Apps	(Gls)
2012–2013	Delfino Pescara 1936	1	(0)
2013–2014	F.C. Aprilia	3	(0)
2015–2016	Derthona FbC 1908	28	(0)
2016–2017	F.C. Catania	3	(0)
- * Club domestic league appearances and goals as of 10 June 2014

David Abdallah Mbodj Mbaye (born 15 September 1994) is a Senegalese football player who currently plays for the Lega Pro club F.C. Catania.
