= Massimiliano Barbone =

Italian footballer (born 1991)

Personal information
- Full name: Massimiliano Barbone
- Date of birth: July 12, 1991 (age 35)
- Place of birth: Ortona, Italy
- Position: Defender

Youth career
- Pescara

Senior career*
Years	Team	Apps	(Gls)
2010–2012	Pescara	0	(0)
2011	→ Giacomense (loan)	4	(0)
2012	→ Ebolitana (loan)	14	(0)
2012–2013	Chieti	6	(1)
- * Club domestic league appearances and goals

Massimiliano Barbone (born 12 July 1991) is a former Italian footballer who plays as a defender.

In 2012, he was signed by S.S. Chieti Calcio.
