= Luca Lulli =

Italian footballer

Personal information
- Date of birth: 22 December 1991 (age 34)
- Place of birth: Atri, Italy
- Height: 1.78 m (5 ft 10 in)
- Position: Defensive midfielder

Team information
- Current team: Siracusa
- Number: 5

Youth career
- Pescara

Senior career*
Years	Team	Apps	(Gls)
2011–2013	Pescara	0	(0)
2011	→ Gavorrano (loan)	13	(0)
2011–2012	→ Como (loan)	23	(0)
2013	→ Paganese (loan)	7	(0)
2013–2015	Teramo	16	(0)
2015–2016	Catania	10	(0)
2016	Savona	14	(0)
2016–2017	Sambenedettese	33	(2)
2017–2018	Pordenone	17	(0)
2018	→ Arezzo (loan)	11	(0)
2018–2019	Fano	30	(0)
2019–2021	Cavese	25	(0)
2021–2023	Sambenedettese	38	(3)
2023–2024	Pianese	11	(0)
2024–2026	Sambenedettese	31	(0)
2026–	Siracusa	0	(0)
- * Club domestic league appearances and goals as of 30 April 2026

Luca Lulli (born 22 December 1991) is an Italian footballer who plays as a defensive midfielder for Serie D Group I club Siracusa.

== Career ==
On 1 July 2019, Lulli signed a two-year contract with Cavese. On 10 April 2021, the contract was terminated by mutual consent.

On 24 September 2021, he returned to Sambenedettese in Serie D.
