= SSD Chieti FC 1922 =

Italian football club

Chieti
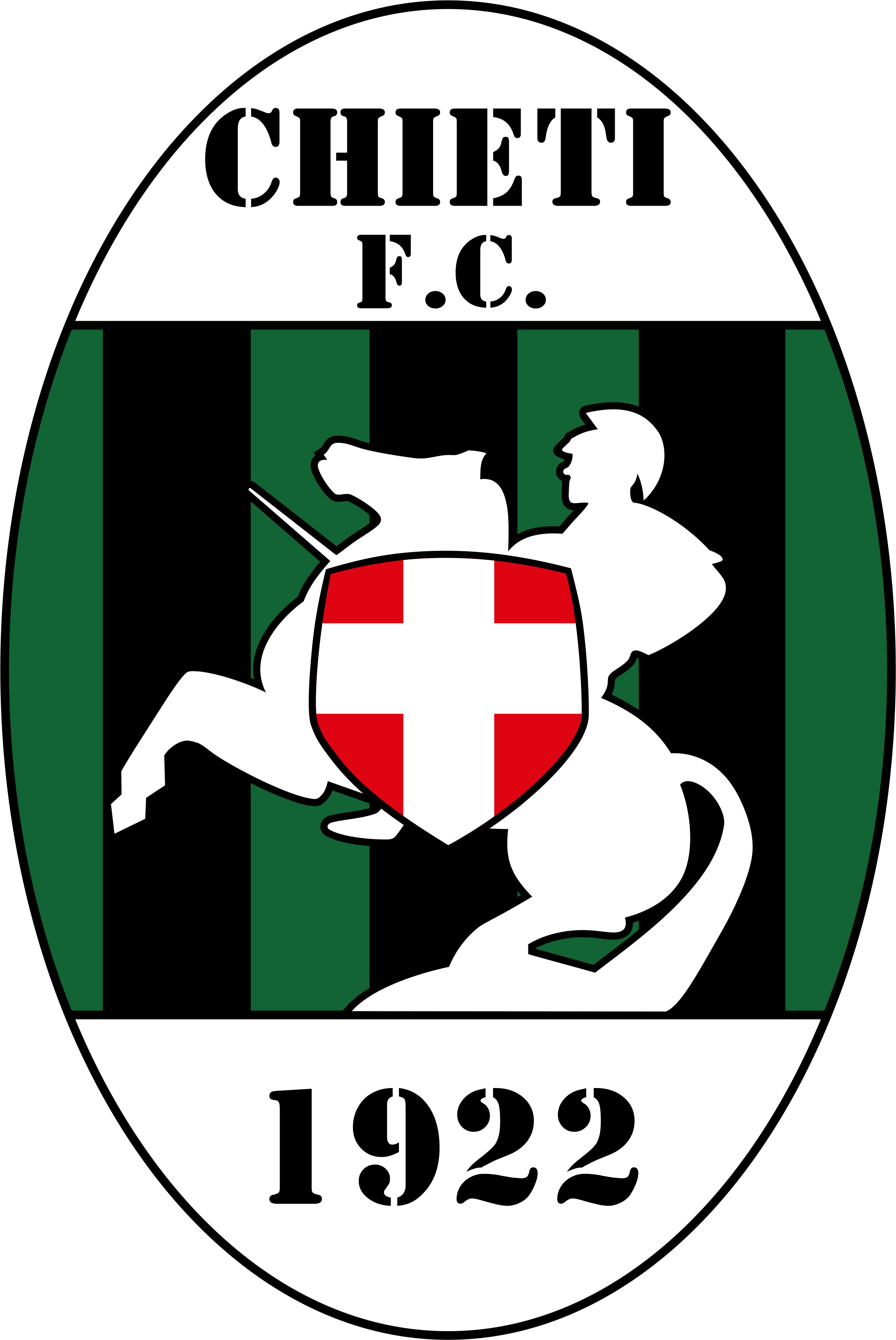
- Full name: Società Sportiva Dilettantistica; Chieti Football Club 1922
- Founded: 1922; 2006 (refounded)
- Dissolved: 2026
- Ground: Stadio Guido Angelini, Chieti, Italy
- Capacity: 12,750
- Chairman: Ettore Serra/Daniele Ferro
- Manager: Robert Vagnoni
- League: Serie D Group F
- 2023–24: Serie D Group F, 8th of 18
- Website: https://www.chietifc1922.com/
Home colours	Away colours

Società Sportiva Dilettantistica Chieti Calcio Football Club 1922, commonly known as Chieti, was an Italian association football club, based in Chieti, Abruzzo. It competed in Eccellenza, the fifth tier of Italian football.

== History ==
=== Foundation ===
Old emblem for A.S.D. Chieti

Chieti was founded in 1922 as Calcio Chieti, with capital of 50 cents. The idea originated from Nicola De Cesare and friends in Villa Comunale. The team started by playing teams in the central Civitella military. Existing club Sport Club Chieti was inactive for long periods, leading to the decision to start Chieti at meeting between the RISS, Novell, and Sport Cub Chieti. The first president was Carlo Massangioli.

Chieti played the 2005/2006 season in Serie C1/B, finishing in last place and was therefore relegated to Serie C2. The team was then cancelled by the federation because of inadequate financing. Then restarted in 6Th tier of italiano football, returning in Serie C2 4 years later. After the cancellation of the Serie C2, got relegated to Serie D, where in 2016 got cancelled again. Restarted from fifth tier of itain football and then staying in Serie D and Eccellenza.

=== Second attempt ===
A.S.D. Chieti then asked to be admitted to play Promozione (7th level of Italian football), claiming Article 52 of N.O.I.F. Chieti gained promotion to Serie D in 2008. Since 2010–11 season, S.S. Chieti Calcio plays in Lega Pro Seconda Divisione.

In 2012–13, the team played in the fourth tier, reaching the promotion playoffs, after securing a draw in the last matchday against Arzanese. Massimiliano Barbone, a defender on loan from Serie B club Pescara. scored the goal that enabled qualification to the playoffs.

In 2025-26 Serie D, they were relegated to Eccellenza Abruzzo. After looking like they would not be able to register for the new season, they were able to. However on 9th November 2026, they withdrew from the league and announced insolvency. On 12th November 2026, they were subsequently excluded from the league.

== Colours and badge ==
The team's colours were green and black.

The choice of black and green Theatines dates to 1919, when the first soccer team representing the City had neither uniforms nor the money to buy them. Instead they found some in a crate from Venice. The pennant team was tweaked over the years. The club was once identified by a crest in the style of AC Milan, then under the leadership of President Antonio Buccilli. They then adopted a pennant depicting two strips (one black and one green) crossing the words "DC 1922" i.e. Chieti Calcio 1922. In 2006, their rudimentary style was reinvented. The last change was made in the summer of 2008 when the previous emblem was added to one side of Achilles horse, the symbol of the city of Chieti.

== Stadium ==
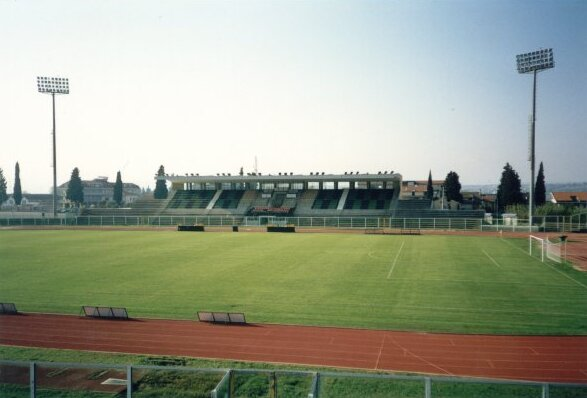
Stadio Guido Angelini

Stadio Guido Angelini was designed in 1969 and became operational in May 1970 with a Chieti-Milan friendly, with 11,000 spectators in attendance. Later the stadium was renamed Marrucino.

== Notable players ==
- Enrico Chiesa
- Fabio Grosso (Italian World Cup Winner, spent three seasons from 1998 to 2001)
- Fabio Quagliarella
