= 2014–15 Serie D =

Serie D
- Season: 2014–15

The 2014–15 Serie D was the sixty-seventh edition of the top level Italian non-professional football championship. It represented the fourth tier in the Italian football league system.

It consisted of 167 teams, including the admitted Arzachena, Rieti and by repechage Biancoscudati Padova, Robur Siena and Sondrio, divided into six 18-team divisions, two 20-team divisions and a 19-team division.

== Promotions ==
The nine division winners are automatically promoted to Lega Pro.

== Playoffs ==
Teams placed second through fifth in each division enter a playoff tournament, after the regular season, where the nine winners compete among themselves with the best semifinalist and the finalist of Coppa Italia Serie D which determine three of the four semi-finalists. The fourth is the winner of Coppa Italia Serie D. The playoff winner (or eligible clubs among the playoff losers) could receive professional licence(s) in event of bankruptcy of a Serie C club (or clubs).

== Relegations ==
- In groups A-D the two last-placed teams (19th and 20th) will playoff with the 18th, if the 15th place is more than 8 points ahead of it and the 17th (or both), and if the 16th place is more than 8 points ahead of the 17th or 18th (or both); the losers are directly relegated. Otherwise the teams ranked 15th to 18th play a two-legged tie-break (15th vs 18th, and 16th vs 17th).
- In group B the two last-placed teams (18th and 19th) will playoff with the 17th, if the 14th place is more than 8 points ahead of it and the 16th (or both), and if the 15th place is more than 8 points ahead of the 16th or 17th (or both); the losers are directly relegated. Otherwise the teams ranked 14th to 17th play a two-legged tie-break (14th vs 17th, and 15th vs 16th).
- In groups C-E-F-G-H-I the two last-placed teams (17th and 18th) will playoff with the 16th, if the 13th place is more than 8 points ahead of it and the 15th (or both), and if the 14th place is more than 8 points ahead of the 15th or 16th (or both); the losers are directly relegated. Otherwise the teams ranked 13th to 16th play a two-legged tie-break (13th vs 16th, and 14th vs 15th).

== Scudetto Serie D ==
The nine division winners enter a tournament which determines the overall Serie D champions and the winner is awarded the Scudetto Serie D.

== Standings ==
=== Girone A ===
==== Teams ====
Teams from Aosta Valley, Piedmont, Liguria and Lombardy

Club	City	Stadium	Capacity	2013–14 season
Acqui	Acqui Terme	Jona Ottolenghi	1,500	1st in Eccellenza Piedmont Girone B
Argentina	Arma di Taggia	Ezio Scalvi		1st in Eccellenza Liguria
Asti	Asti	Censin Bosia	6,000	9th in Serie D Girone A
Borgomanero	Borgomanero	Comunale	1,000	14th in Serie D Girone B
Borgosesia	Borgosesia	Comunale	2,500	3rd in Serie D Girone A
Bra	Bra	Attilio Bravi	1,000	18th in Lega Pro Seconda Divisione A
Caronnese	Caronno Pertusella	Comunale	1,000	4th in Serie D Girone A
Chieri	Chieri	Piero De Paoli	4,000	6th in Serie D Girone A
Cuneo	Cuneo	Fratelli Paschiero	4,000	11th in Lega Pro Seconda Divisione A
Derthona	Tortona	Fausto Coppi	2,700	13th in Serie D Girone A
Lavagnese	Lavagna	Edoardo Riboli	800	5th in Serie D Girone A
Novese	Novi Ligure	Costante Girardengo	3,500	10th in Serie D Girone A
OltrepoVoghera	Stradella & Voghera	Giovanni Parisi	4,000	1st in Eccellenza Lombardy Girone A
Pro Settimo & Eureka	Settimo Torinese	Renzo Valla		1st in Eccellenza Piedmont Girone A
RapalloBogliasco	Bogliasco (playing in Santa Margherita Ligure)	Eugenio Broccardi	2,000	2nd in Serie D Girone A
Sancolombano	San Colombano al Lambro	Franco Riccardi	2,000	5th in Serie D Girone D
Sestri Levante	Sestri Levante	Giuseppe Sivori	1,500	15th in Serie D Girone A
Sporting Bellinzago	Bellinzago Novarese	Comunale		2nd in Eccellenza Piedmont Girone A
Vado	Vado Ligure	Ferruccio Chittolina	2,000	7th in Serie D Girone A
Vallée d’Aoste	Saint-Christophe	Comunale		11th in Serie D Girone A

==== League table ====
Pos	Team	Pld	W	D	L	GF	GA	GD	Pts	Promotion or relegation
1	Cuneo (C, P)	38	24	7	7	63	30	+33	79	2015–16 Lega Pro
2	Sestri Levante (O)	38	22	12	4	48	24	+24	78	Qualification for Promotion play-off
3	Chieri	38	22	8	8	60	36	+24	74	Qualification for Promotion play-off
4	Borgosesia	38	22	7	9	73	46	+27	73	Qualification for Promotion play-off
5	Caronnese	38	19	14	5	62	33	+29	71	Qualification for Promotion play-off
6	Pro Settimo & Eureka	38	19	9	10	56	41	+15	66	
7	Bra	38	18	11	9	68	49	+19	65	
8	OltrepoVoghera	38	18	7	13	59	50	+9	61	
9	Lavagnese	38	16	10	12	50	43	+7	58	
10	Acqui	38	14	12	12	53	49	+4	54	
11	Sporting Bellinzago	38	14	9	15	56	60	−4	51	
12	Vado	38	13	8	17	54	62	−8	47	
13	Novese	38	12	9	17	45	48	−3	45	
14	Asti (R)	38	11	11	16	40	50	−10	44	2015–16 Promozione
15	Argentina	38	11	11	16	58	70	−12	44	
16	RapalloBogliasco	38	11	9	18	46	57	−11	42	
17	Sancolombano (R)	38	7	12	19	29	48	−19	33	2015–16 Eccellenza
18	Derthona	38	6	9	23	30	61	−31	27	Readmitted
19	Vallée d'Aoste (R)	38	5	6	27	37	74	−37	21	2015–16 Eccellenza
20	Borgomanero (R)	38	3	5	30	29	85	−56	14	2015–16 Eccellenza

Updated to match(es) played on 10 May 2015. Source: Soccerway
Rules for classification: 1) points; 2) goal difference; 3) number of goals scored.
(C) Champions; (O) Play-off winners; (P) Promoted; (R) Relegated

=== Girone B ===
==== Teams ====
Teams from Lombardy & Veneto

Club	City	Stadium	Capacity	2013–14 season
Atletico Montichiari	Montichiari	Romeo Menti	2,500	15th in Serie D Girone D
Aurora Seriate	Seriate	Comunale	1,000	10th in Serie D Girone B
Caravaggio	Caravaggio	Comunale	3,000	8th in Serie D Girone B
Castellana	Castel Goffredo	Comunale	1,500	12th in Serie D Girone B
Castiglione	Castiglione delle Stiviere	Ugo Lusetti	2,500	16th in Lega Pro Seconda Divisione A
Ciliverghe Mazzano	Mazzano	Comunale Molinetto		1st in Eccellenza Lombardy Girone C
Ciserano	Ciserano (playing in Cologno al Serio)	Giacinto Facchetti		1st in Eccellenza Lombardy Girone B
Folgore Caratese	Carate Brianza	XXV Aprile	3,000	12th in Serie D Girone A
Inveruno	Inveruno	Comunale	600	5th in Serie D Girone B
Lecco	Lecco	Rigamonti-Ceppi	4,977	9th in Serie D Girone B
MapelloBonate	Mapello and Bonate Sopra (playing in Mapello)	Comunale	1,000	13th in Serie D Girone B
Olginatese	Olginate	Comunale	1,000	2nrd in Serie D Girone B
Pergolettese	Crema	Giuseppe Voltini	4,100	15th in Lega Pro Seconda Divisione A
Pontisola	Ponte San Pietro, Terno d'Isola and Chignolo d'Isola (playing in Ponte San Pietro)	Matteo Legler	2,000	6th in Serie D Girone B
Pro Sesto	Sesto San Giovanni	Breda	4,500	7th in Serie D Girone B
Seregno	Seregno	Ferruccio	3,700	4th in Serie D Girone B
Sondrio	Sondrio	Coni Castellina	1,300	2nd in Eccellenza Lombardy Girone B
Villafranca	Villafranca di Verona	Comunale	1,000	1st in Eccellenza Veneto Girone A
Virtus Verona	Verona	M.Gavagnin - S.Nocini	1,200	14th in Lega Pro Seconda Divisione A

==== League table ====
Pos	Team	Pld	W	D	L	GF	GA	GD	Pts	Qualification or relegation
1	Castiglione (R, C)	36	22	8	6	54	26	+28	74	Declined promotion; entered Terza Categoria
2	Lecco	36	19	9	8	65	42	+23	66	Qualification for Promotion play-off
3	Seregno	36	20	5	11	64	37	+27	65	Qualification for Promotion play-off
4	Ciserano	36	17	9	10	53	39	+14	60	Qualification for Promotion play-off
5	Virtus Verona	36	15	14	7	58	34	+24	59	Qualification for Promotion play-off
6	Pergolettese	36	15	10	11	46	44	+2	55	
7	Olginatese	36	15	9	12	44	34	+10	54	
8	Pontisola	36	14	10	12	50	42	+8	52	
9	Ciliverghe Mazzano	36	14	9	13	37	40	−3	51	
10	Sondrio	36	15	6	15	46	50	−4	51	
11	Aurora Seriate	36	14	8	14	42	43	−1	50	Merged with AlzanoCene
12	Inveruno	36	13	10	13	47	48	−1	49	
13	Villafranca	36	12	11	13	44	49	−5	47	
14	MapelloBonate	36	12	11	13	36	48	−12	47	
15	Pro Sesto	36	13	8	15	38	41	−3	47	Qualification for Relegation play-off
16	Caravaggio	36	11	8	17	37	42	−5	41	Readmitted
17	Folgore Caratese	36	7	16	13	34	40	−6	37	Readmitted
18	Castellana (R)	36	7	9	20	36	61	−25	30	2015–16 Eccellenza
19	Atletico Montichiari (R)	36	1	2	33	26	97	−71	5	2015–16 Eccellenza

Updated to match(es) played on 10 May 2015. Source: Soccerway
Rules for classification: 1) points; 2) goal difference; 3) number of goals scored.
(C) Champions; (R) Relegated

=== Girone C ===
==== Teams ====
Teams from Friuli-Venezia Giulia, Trentino-Alto Adige/Südtirol & Veneto

Club	City	Stadium	Capacity	2013–14 season
Altovicentino	Marano Vicentino and Valdagno (playing in Valdagno)	Stadio dei Fiori	6,000	2nd in Serie D Girone C (as Marano) 9th in Serie D Girone C (as Trissino-Valdagno)
Belluno	Belluno	Polisportivo	2,585	4th in Serie D Girone C
Biancoscudati Padova	Padova	Euganeo	18,060	20th in Serie B (as Calcio Padova)
Clodiense	Chioggia	Aldo e Dino Ballarin	3,622	9th in Serie D Girone D
Dro	Dro	Comunale Oltra	500	16th in Serie D Girone C
Fontanafredda	Fontanafredda	Omero Tognon	5,000	1st in Eccellenza Friuli-Venezia Giulia
Giorgione	Castelfranco Veneto	Comunale	2,100	11th in Serie D Girone C
Kras	Monrupino	Repen	250	2nd in Eccellenza Friuli-Venezia Giulia
Legnago Salus	Legnago	Mario Sandrini	2,152	11th in Serie D Girone B
Mezzocorona	Mezzocorona	Comunale	1,500	15th in Serie D Girone C
Montebelluna	Montebelluna	San Vigilio	2,000	8th in Serie D Girone C
Mori S. Stefano	Mori	Campo Sportivo Mori	450	1st in Eccellenza Trentino-Alto Adige
Sacilese	Sacile	XXV Aprile – Aldo Castenetto	2,600	3rd in Serie D Girone C
Tamai	Brugnera	Comunale	1,000	12th in Serie D Girone C
Triestina	Trieste	Nereo Rocco	32,454	10th in Serie D Girone C
Union ArzignanoChiampo	Arzignano	Tommaso Dal Molin	2,000	2nd in Eccellenza Veneto Girone A
Union Pro	Mogliano Veneto & Preganziol (playing in Mogliano Veneto)	Arles Panisi	2,300	1st in Eccellenza Veneto Girone B
Union Ripa La Fenadora	Seren del Grappa	Comunale Boscherai	500	6th in Serie D Girone C

==== League table ====
Pos	Team	Pld	W	D	L	GF	GA	GD	Pts	Promotion or relegation
1	Padova (C, P)	34	27	4	3	77	30	+47	85	2015–16 Lega Pro
2	Altovicentino	34	21	7	6	63	34	+29	70	Qualification for Promotion play-off
3	Sacilese	34	18	8	8	62	31	+31	62	Qualification for Promotion play-off
4	Belluno	34	16	11	7	57	38	+19	59	Qualification for Promotion play-off
5	Union ArzignanoChiampo	34	15	11	8	53	39	+14	56	Qualification for Promotion play-off
6	Union Pro	34	16	7	11	46	42	+4	55	
7	Clodiense	34	13	10	11	48	47	+1	49	
8	Montebelluna	34	12	11	11	45	49	−4	47	
9	Union Ripa La Fenadora	34	11	12	11	45	41	+4	45	
10	Fontanafredda	34	12	8	14	50	49	+1	44	
11	Legnago Salus	34	11	10	13	50	55	−5	43	
12	Tamai	34	9	14	11	42	38	+4	41	
13	Giorgione	34	10	8	16	39	50	−11	38	Qualification for Relegation play-off
14	Dro	34	7	14	13	37	50	−13	35	Readmitted
15	Triestina	34	6	16	12	41	51	−10	34	Qualification for Relegation play-off
16	Kras (R)	34	8	9	17	41	58	−17	33	Qualification for Relegation play-off
17	Mori S. Stefano (R)	34	4	7	23	31	69	−38	19	2015–16 Eccellenza
18	Mezzocorona (R)	34	3	7	24	20	76	−56	12 (Note: Mezzocorona was deducted 4 points.)	2015–16 Eccellenza

Updated to match(es) played on 10 May 2015. Source: Soccerway
Rules for classification: 1) points; 2) goal difference; 3) number of goals scored.
(C) Champions; (P) Promoted; (R) Relegated

=== Girone D ===
==== Teams ====
Teams from Emilia-Romagna, Tuscany & Veneto

Club	City	Stadium	Capacity	2013–14 season
Abano	Abano Terme	Stadio delle Terme	1,000	4th in Eccellenza Veneto Girone A
Atletico San Paolo Padova	Padua	Euganeo	18,060	5th in Serie D Girone D
Bellaria Igea	Bellaria-Igea Marina	Enrico Nanni	2,500	17th in Lega Pro Seconda Divisione A
Correggese	Correggio	Walter Borelli	1,500	2nd in Serie D Girone D
Delta Porto Tolle Rovigo	Rovigo	Stadio Francesco Gabrielli	3,000	10th in Lega Pro Seconda Divisione A (as A.C. Delta Porto Tolle)
Este	Este	Nuovo Comunale	1,200	7th in Serie D Girone C
Fidenza	Fidenza	Dario Ballotta	1,400	13th in Serie D Girone D
Fiorenzuola	Fiorenzuola d'Arda	Comunale	4,000	1st in Eccellenza Emilia-Romagna Girone A
Formigine	Formigine	Stadio Pincelli	1,500	10th in Serie D Girone D
Fortis Juventus	Borgo San Lorenzo	Stadio Giacomo Romanelli	2,500	6th in Serie D Girone D
Imolese	Imola	Romeo Galli	4,000	8th in Serie D Girone D
Jolly Montemurlo	Montemurlo	Aldo Nelli	400	13th in Serie D Girone E
Mezzolara	Budrio	Pietro Zucchini	1,300	7th in Serie D Girone D
Piacenza	Piacenza	Leonardo Garilli	21,668	3rd in Serie D Girone B
Ribelle	Castiglione di Ravenna	Massimo Sbrighi	1,000	1st in Eccellenza Emilia-Romagna Girone B
Rimini	Rimini	Romeo Neri	7,442	13th in Lega Pro Seconda Divisione A
Romagna Centro	Martorano (playing in Cesena)	Dino Manuzzi	23,860	5th in Serie D Girone D
Scandicci	Scandicci	Turri	1,800	5th in Serie D Girone E
Thermal Abano Teolo	Abano Terme and Teolo	Stadio delle Terme	1,000	4th in Serie D Girone D
Virtus Castelfranco	Castelfranco Emilia	Fausto Ferrarini	1,280	11th in Serie D Girone D

==== League table ====
Pos	Team	Pld	W	D	L	GF	GA	GD	Pts	Promotion or relegation
1	Rimini (C, P)	38	27	5	6	81	35	+46	86	2015–16 Lega Pro
2	Delta Porto Tolle Rovigo	38	21	11	6	83	38	+45	74	Qualification for Promotion play-off
3	Correggese	38	21	9	8	71	45	+26	72	Qualification for Promotion play-off
4	Piacenza	38	21	9	8	60	34	+26	72	Qualification for Promotion play-off
5	Este	38	18	13	7	69	41	+28	67	Qualification for Promotion play-off
6	Abano	38	14	11	13	49	47	+2	53	Qualification for Promotion play-off
7	Fiorenzuola	38	13	13	12	46	45	+1	52	
8	Scandicci	38	11	15	12	47	48	−1	48	Qualification for Promotion play-off
9	Jolly Montemurlo	38	11	14	13	49	57	−8	47	
10	Imolese	38	11	13	14	44	50	−6	46	
11	Fortis Juventus	38	11	13	14	42	53	−11	46	
12	Bellaria Igea	38	14	10	14	41	46	−5	52	
13	Virtus Castelfranco	38	11	12	15	49	59	−10	45	
14	Ribelle	38	11	11	16	41	54	−13	44	
15	Mezzolara	38	11	11	16	49	58	−9	44	
16	Fidenza (R)	38	8	17	13	36	45	−9	41	Qualification for Relegation play-off
17	Romagna Centro	38	8	13	17	50	67	−17	37	Qualification for Relegation play-off
18	Atletico San Paolo Padova	38	9	9	20	37	61	−24	36	Readmitted
19	Thermal Abano Teolo (R)	38	6	13	19	39	69	−30	31	2015–16 Eccellenza
20	Formigine (R)	38	4	16	18	36	67	−31	28	2015–16 Eccellenza

Updated to match(es) played on 10 May 2015. Source: Soccerway
Rules for classification: 1) points; 2) goal difference; 3) number of goals scored.
(C) Champions; (P) Promoted; (R) Relegated

=== Girone E ===
==== Teams ====
Teams from Tuscany, Umbria & Lazio

Club	City	Stadium	Capacity	2013–14 season
Bastia	Bastia Umbra	Comunale	1,500	14th in Serie D Girone E
Flaminia Civita Castellana	Civita Castellana	Turrido Madani	1,300	10th in Serie D Girone E
Foligno	Foligno	Enzo Blasone	5,650	2nd in Serie D Girone E
Gavorrano	Gavorrano	Romeo Malservisi	2,000	18th in Lega Pro Seconda Divisione B
Gualdo Casacastalda	Gualdo Tadino	Carlo Angelo Luzi	4,100	9th in Serie D Girone E
Massese	Massa	degli Oliveti	11,500	3rd in Serie D Girone D
Olimpia Colligiana	Colle di Val d'Elsa	Gino Manni	3,000	7th in Serie D Girone E
Pianese	Piancastagnaio	Comunale	1,000	4th in Serie D Girone E
Poggibonsi	Poggibonsi	Stefano Lotti	2,513	16th in Lega Pro Seconda Divisione B
Ponsacco	Ponsacco	Comunale	3,220	1st in Eccellenza Toscana Girone A
Rieti	Rieti	Stadio Centro d'Italia – Manlio Scopigno	9,980	2nd in Eccellenza Lazio Girone A
Robur Siena	Siena	Artemio Franchi	15,373	9th in Serie B (as A.C. Siena)
San Donato Tavarnelle	Tavarnelle Val di Pesa (playing in Colle di Val d'Elsa)	Gino Manni	3,000	1st in Eccellenza Toscana Girone B
SanGiovanniValdarno	San Giovanni Valdarno	Virgilio Fedini	3,378	2nd in Eccellenza Toscana Girone B
Sansepolcro	Sansepolcro	Giovanni Buitoni	2,000	8th in Serie D Girone E
Trestina	Trestina	Lorenzo Casini	500	11th in Serie D Girone E
Villabiagio	San Biagio della Valle and Villanova di Marsciano (playing in Castiglione della Valle)	Vestrelli		1st in Eccellenza Umbria
Voluntas Spoleto	Spoleto	Comunale	1,800	12th in Serie D Girone E

==== League table ====
Pos	Team	Pld	W	D	L	GF	GA	GD	Pts	Promotion or relegation
1	Robur Siena (C, P)	34	21	9	4	63	30	+33	72	2015–16 Lega Pro
2	Poggibonsi	34	18	14	2	45	24	+21	68	Qualification for Promotion play-off
3	Rieti	34	18	7	9	57	31	+26	61	Qualification for Promotion play-off
4	Ponsacco	34	18	7	9	53	33	+20	61	Qualification for Promotion play-off
5	Massese	34	15	13	6	51	33	+18	58	Qualification for Promotion play-off
6	Sansepolcro	34	14	13	7	51	36	+15	55	
7	Gualdo Casacastalda	34	14	7	13	50	46	+4	49	
8	SanGiovanniValdarno	34	13	10	11	44	43	+1	49	
9	Foligno	34	12	12	10	51	42	+9	48	
10	Flaminia Civita Castellana	34	13	7	14	48	60	−12	46	
11	Pianese	34	10	13	11	47	47	0	43	
12	Gavorrano	34	10	12	12	45	51	−6	42	
13	Voluntas Spoleto	34	10	9	15	40	51	−11	39	
14	Olimpia Colligiana	34	9	10	15	30	41	−11	37	Qualification for Relegation play-off
15	San Donato Tavarnelle (R)	34	10	7	17	47	59	−12	37	Qualification for Relegation play-off
16	Villabiagio (R)	34	6	13	15	42	57	−15	31	2015–16 Eccellenza
17	Trestina (R)	34	6	7	21	32	58	−26	25	2015–16 Eccellenza
18	Bastia (R)	34	1	7	26	26	80	−54	10	2015–16 Eccellenza

Updated to match(es) played on 10 May 2015. Source: Soccerway
Rules for classification: 1) points; 2) goal difference; 3) number of goals scored.
(C) Champions; (P) Promoted; (R) Relegated

=== Girone F ===
==== Teams ====
Teams from Abruzzo, Marche & Molise

Club	City	Stadium	Capacity	2013–14 season
Amiternina	Scoppito	Comunale	500	15th in Serie D Girone F
Campobasso	Campobasso	Romagnoli	4,000	1st in Eccellenza Molise
Castelfidardo	Castelfidardo	G. Mancini	2,000	2nd in Eccellenza Marche
Celano	Celano	Fabio Piccone	3,200	7th in Serie D Girone F
Chieti	Chieti	Guido Angelini	12,750	15th in Lega Pro Seconda Divisione B
Civitanovese	Civitanova Marche	Comunale	4,000	10th in Serie D Girone F
Fano	Fano	Raffaele Mancini	8,800	11th in Serie D Girone F
Fermana	Fermo	bruno Recchioni	9,500	9th in Serie D Girone F
Giulianova	Giulianova	Rubens Fadini	4,347	12th in Serie D Girone F
Jesina	Jesi	Pacifico Carotti	5,000	8th in Serie D Girone F
Maceratese	Macerata	Helvia Recina	5,846	4th in Serie D Girone F
Matelica	Matelica	Comunale	500	2nd in Serie D Girone F
Olympia Agnonese	Agnone	Civitelle	4,000	13th in Serie D Girone F
Recanatese	Recanati	Nicola Tubaldi	2,000	5th in Serie D Girone F
Sambenedettese	San Benedetto del Tronto	Riviera delle Palme	14,995	1st in Eccellenza Marche
San Nicolò	San Nicolò a Tordino	Gaetano Bonolis	7,498	1st in Eccellenza Abruzzo
Termoli	Termoli	Gino Cannarsa	3,300	3rd in Serie D Girone F
Vis Pesaro	Pesaro	Tonino Benelli	4,050	6th in Serie D Girone F

==== League table ====
Pos	Team	Pld	W	D	L	GF	GA	GD	Pts	Promotion or relegation
1	Maceratese (C, P)	34	22	12	0	61	22	+39	78	2015–16 Lega Pro
2	Fano	34	22	8	4	60	25	+35	74	Qualification for Promotion play-off
3	Sambenedettese	34	18	9	7	71	40	+31	63	Qualification for Promotion play-off
4	Campobasso	34	15	12	7	49	42	+7	57	Qualification for Promotion play-off
5	San Nicolò	34	14	13	7	59	46	+13	55	Qualification for Promotion play-off
6	Chieti	33	12	14	7	52	46	+6	50	
7	Civitanovese	34	13	11	10	55	51	+4	50	Club refounded; restart in Eccellenza
8	Matelica	34	11	12	11	36	34	+2	45	
9	Giulianova	34	10	15	9	44	43	+1	45	
10	Jesina	34	10	13	11	40	38	+2	43	
11	Fermana	34	11	9	14	38	44	−6	42	
12	Recanatese	34	9	12	13	37	44	−7	39	
13	Termoli	34	10	9	15	31	53	−22	39	Club resigned to Eccellenza
14	Amiternina	34	9	11	14	30	45	−15	38	Qualification for Relegation play-off
15	Olympia Agnonese	34	8	7	19	31	51	−20	31	Readmitted
16	Castelfidardo	34	7	10	17	25	49	−24	31	Readmitted
17	Vis Pesaro	34	6	11	17	35	45	−10	29	Readmitted
18	Celano (R)	34	4	5	25	23	59	−36	17	2015–16 Eccellenza

Updated to match(es) played on 10 May 2015. Source: Soccerway
Rules for classification: 1) points; 2) goal difference; 3) number of goals scored.
(C) Champions; (P) Promoted; (R) Relegated

=== Girone G ===
==== Teams ====
Teams from Lazio & Sardinia

Club	City	Stadium	Capacity	2013–14 season
Anziolavinio	Anzio	Massimo Bruschini	3,000	7th in Serie D Girone G
Aprilia	Aprilia	Quinto Ricci	2,000	14th in Lega Pro Seconda Divisione B
Arzachena	Arzachena	Biagio Pirina	3,100	16th in Serie D Girone G
Astrea	Rome	Casal del Marmo	2,500	8th in Serie D Girone G
Budoni	Budoni	Comunale	1,500	13th in Serie D Girone G
Cynthia	Genzano di Roma	Stadio Comunale (Genzano di Roma)	4,550	5th in Serie D Girone G
Fondi	Fondi	Domenico Purificato	2,500	6th in Serie D Girone G
Isola Liri	Isola del Liri	Conte Arduino Mangoni	3,008	11th in Serie D Girone G
Lupa Castelli Romani	Frascati	Stadio VIII Settembre di Frascati	5,000	1st in Eccellenza Lazio Girone B
Nuorese	Nuoro	Franco Frogheri	7,000	1st in Eccellenza Sardinia
Olbia	Olbia	Bruno Nespoli	3,200	4th in Serie D Girone G
Ostia Mare	Ostia	Anco Marzio	1,000	6th in Serie D Girone E
Palestrina	Rome	Francesca Gianni	4,000	10th in Serie D Girone G
San Cesareo	San Cesareo	Comunale	2,000	3rd in Serie D Girone G
Selargius	Selargius	Generale Virgilio Porcu	1,200	15th in Serie D Girone G
Sora	Sora	Claudio Tomei	6,500	12th in Serie D Girone G
Terracina	Terracina	Mario Colavolpe	4,000	2nd in Serie D Girone G
Viterbese Castrense	Viterbo	Attilio Gregori	3,000	1st in Eccellenza Lazio Girone A

==== League table ====
Pos	Team	Pld	W	D	L	GF	GA	GD	Pts	Promotion or relegation
1	Lupa Castelli Romani (C, P)	34	23	9	2	72	24	+48	78	2015–16 Lega Pro
2	Viterbese Castrense	34	21	8	5	86	30	+56	71	Qualification for Promotion play-off
3	Olbia	34	17	7	10	60	46	+14	58	Qualification for Promotion play-off
4	Budoni	34	15	12	7	69	47	+22	57	Qualification for Promotion play-off
5	Ostia Mare	34	16	7	11	58	30	+28	55	Qualification for Promotion play-off
6	San Cesareo	34	14	12	8	47	38	+9	54	
7	Arzachena	34	12	15	7	47	38	+9	51	
8	Fondi	34	14	8	12	55	49	+6	50	
9	Cynthia	34	13	11	10	36	34	+2	50	
10	Nuorese	34	11	15	8	48	43	+5	48	
11	Aprilia	34	12	11	11	50	49	+1	47	
12	Astrea	34	11	8	15	52	54	−2	41	
13	Sora	34	11	11	12	39	44	−5	41 (Note: 3 points deducted)	Club folded
14	Palestrina (R)	34	10	7	17	43	48	−5	35 (Note: 2 points deducted)	Qualification for Relegation play-off
15	Isola Liri	34	9	8	17	32	45	−13	34 (Note: 1 point deducted)	Qualification for Relegation play-off
16	Selargius (R)	34	8	4	22	40	99	−59	28	2015–16 Eccellenza
17	Terracina	34	4	8	22	36	75	−39	19	Club refounded
18	Anziolavinio (R)	34	2	5	27	26	103	−77	10	2015–16 Eccellenza

Updated to match(es) played on 10 May 2015. Source: Soccerway
Rules for classification: 1) points; 2) goal difference; 3) number of goals scored.
(C) Champions; (P) Promoted; (R) Relegated

=== Girone H ===
==== Teams ====
Teams from Apulia, Basilicata and Campania.

Club	City	Stadium	Capacity	2013–14 season
Arzanese	Arzano	Sabatino De Rosa	4,000	12th in Lega Pro Seconda Divisione B
Bisceglie	Bisceglie	Gustavo Ventura	5,000	8th in Serie D Girone H
Brindisi	Brindisi	Franco Fanuzzi	7,600	6th in Serie D Girone H
Cavese	Cava de' Tirreni	Simonetta Lamberti	5,200	7th in Serie D Girone I
Fidelis Andria	Andria	Degli Ulivi	9,140	2nd in Eccellenza Apulia
Francavilla	Francavilla in Sinni	Nunzio Fittipaldi	1,200	7th in Serie D Girone H
Gallipoli	Gallipoli	Antonio Bianco	5,000	1st in Eccellenza Apulia
Gelbison Cilento	Vallo della Lucania	Giovanni Morra	4,000	9th in Serie D Girone H
Grottaglie	Grottaglie	Atlantico D'Amuri	1,800	16th in Serie D Girone H
Manfredonia	Manfredonia	Miramare	4,076	10th in Serie D Girone H
Monopoli	Monopoli	Vito Simone Veneziani	8,000	4th in Serie D Girone H
Pomigliano	Pomigliano d'Arco	Ugo Gobbato	1,600	11th in Serie D Girone I
Puteolana Internapoli	Pozzuoli	Domenico Conte	7,000	13th in Serie D Girone H
R. Potenza	Potenza	Alfredo Viviani	5,500	1st in Eccellenza Basilicata
San Severo	San Severo	Ricciardelli	300	12th in Serie D Girone H
Sarnese	Sarno	Principe Filomarino		2nd in Eccellenza Campania Girone B (as Real Trentinara)
Taranto	Taranto	Erasmo Iacovone	27,584	2nd in Serie D Girone H
U.S. Scafatese	Scafati	28 Settembre 1943	2,605	1st in Eccellenza Campania Girone B (as Virtus Scafatese)

==== League table ====
Pos	Team	Pld	W	D	L	GF	GA	GD	Pts	Promotion or relegation
1	Fidelis Andria (C, P)	34	22	8	4	64	39	+25	74	2015–16 Lega Pro
2	Taranto	34	19	12	3	53	24	+29	69	Qualification for Promotion play-off
3	R. Potenza	34	20	7	7	59	46	+13	67	Qualification for Promotion play-off
4	Bisceglie	34	17	11	6	57	33	+24	62	Qualification for Promotion play-off
5	Cavese	34	19	5	10	72	44	+28	56 (Note: 6 points deducted)	
6	Gelbison Cilento	34	15	4	15	43	41	+2	49	
7	Sarnese	34	12	8	14	51	57	−6	44	
8	Gallipoli	34	12	8	14	42	50	−8	44	
9	Manfredonia	35	11	11	13	45	44	+1	44	
10	Monopoli (P)	35	11	10	14	48	39	+9	43	Qualification for Promotion play-off
11	Francavilla	34	10	9	15	42	42	0	39	
12	San Severo	34	10	9	15	45	53	−8	39	
13	Pomigliano	34	10	8	16	35	50	−15	38	Qualification for Relegation play-off
14	Arzanese (R)	34	7	12	15	40	50	−10	33	Qualification for Relegation play-off
15	U.S. Scafatese (R)	34	7	8	19	30	52	−22	29	2015–16 Eccellenza
16	Puteolana Internapoli	34	5	9	20	22	64	−42	24	Club folded
17	Grottaglie (R)	34	6	5	23	28	63	−35	22 (Note: 1 point deducted)	2015–16 Eccellenza
18	Brindisi	34	18	6	10	64	44	+20	60	Excluded from league competitions (Note: Placed last and excluded from league football for involvement in 2015 Italian football scandal.)

Updated to match(es) played on 10 May 2015. Source: Soccerway
Rules for classification: 1) points; 2) goal difference; 3) number of goals scored.
(C) Champions; (P) Promoted; (R) Relegated

=== Girone I ===
==== Teams ====
Teams from Calabria, Campania and Sicily.

Club	City	Stadium	Capacity	2013–14 season
Agropoli	Agropoli	Raffaele Guariglia	5,000	3rd in Serie D Girone I
Akragas	Agrigento	Esseneto	8,500	2nd in Serie D Girone I
Battipagliese	Battipaglia	Luigi Pastena	7,000	4th in Serie D Girone I
Due Torri	Piraino	Enzo Vasi	3,800	15th in Serie D Girone I
HinterReggio	Reggio Calabria	Comunale Ravagnese	1,200	8th in Serie D Girone I
Leonfortese	Leonforte	Comunale	2,000	1st in Eccellenza Sicily Girone A
Montalto Uffugo	Montalto Uffugo (playing in Paola)	Comunale	2,500	12th in Serie D Girone I
Neapolis	Mugnano di Napoli	Alberto Vallefuoco	2,500	3rd in Serie D Girone H (as Turris Neapolis)
Nerostellati Frattese	Frattamaggiore	Pasquale Ianniello	5,000	1st in Eccellenza Campania Girone A
Nuova Gioiese	Gioia Tauro	Polivalente	7,000	6th in Serie D Girone I
Noto	Noto	Polisportivo Palatucci	3,000	9th in Serie D Girone I
Orlandina	Capo d'Orlando	Ciccino Micale	5,000	10th in Serie D Girone I
Progreditur Marcianise	Marcianise	Progreditur	4,550	5th in Serie D Girone H
Rende	Rende	Marco Lorenzon	5,000	13th in Serie D Girone I
Roccella	Roccella Ionica	Ninetto Muscolo	2,000	1st in Eccellenza Calabria
Sorrento	Sorrento	Italia	3,600	9th in Lega Pro Prima Divisione B
Tiger Brolo	Brolo	Comunale	1,500	1st in Eccellenza Sicily Girone B
Torrecuso	Torrecuso	G. Ocone	1,500	5th in Serie D Girone I

==== League table ====
Pos	Team	Pld	W	D	L	GF	GA	GD	Pts	Promotion or relegation
1	Akragas (C, P)	34	20	13	1	79	29	+50	73	2015–16 Lega Pro
2	Rende	34	18	10	6	53	29	+24	64	Qualification for Promotion play-off
3	Agropoli	34	18	8	8	66	34	+32	62	Qualification for Promotion play-off
4	Torrecuso	34	18	6	10	64	45	+19	59 (Note: 1 point deducted)	Qualification for Promotion play-off
5	Neapolis	34	16	9	9	54	28	+26	57	Club folded
6	Nerostellati Frattese	34	16	6	12	64	57	+7	54	
7	Due Torri	34	14	10	10	35	27	+8	52	
8	Leonfortese	34	15	7	12	45	38	+7	52	
9	Progreditur Marcianise	34	13	8	13	41	44	−3	47	
10	HinterReggio	34	12	10	12	50	42	+8	46	Club folded
11	Nuova Gioiese	34	10	14	10	46	42	+4	44	Club folded
12	Roccella	34	10	13	11	49	52	−3	43	
13	Noto	34	11	7	16	36	42	−6	39	Qualification for Relegation play-off
14	Sorrento (R)	34	11	5	18	40	44	−4	38	Qualification for Relegation play-off
15	Battipagliese	34	10	7	17	39	43	−4	37	Club folded
16	Tiger Brolo	34	7	12	15	32	45	−13	33	Club folded
17	Montalto Uffugo (R)	34	7	8	19	50	66	−16	29	2015–16 Eccellenza
18	Orlandina (R)	34	1	5	28	11	146	−135	6 (Note: 2 points deducted)	2015–16 Eccellenza

Updated to match(es) played on 10 May 2015. Source: Soccerway
Rules for classification: 1) points; 2) goal difference; 3) number of goals scored.
(C) Champions; (P) Promoted; (R) Relegated

== Scudetto Dilettanti ==
First round

- division winners placed into 3 groups of 3
- group winners and best second-placed team qualify for semi-finals
- rank in Discipline Cup and head-to-head will break a tie or ties in points for the top position in a group
- Listed in order in Discipline Cup: Cuneo, Castiglione, Lupa Castelli Romani, Maceratese, Siena, Padova, Rimini, Andria, Akragas.

Group 1

Team	Pld	W	D	L	GF	GA	GD	Pts
Castiglione	2	1	1	0	3	2	+1	4
Padova	2	1	1	0	3	1	+2	4
Cuneo	2	0	0	2	1	4	−3	0

17 May 2015, 16:00
Castiglione (B)	1–1	Biancoscudati Padova (C)	Castiglione delle Stiviere
20 May 2015, 16:00
Cuneo (A)	1–2	Castiglione (B)	Cuneo
24 May 2015, 16:00
Biancoscudati Padova (C)	2–0	Cuneo (A)	Padua

Group 2

Team	Pld	W	D	L	GF	GA	GD	Pts
Maceratese	2	1	1	0	5	0	+5	4
Robur Siena	2	1	1	0	1	0	+1	4
Rimini	2	0	0	2	0	6	−6	0

17 May 2015, 16:00
Robur Siena (E)	1–0	Rimini (D)	Siena
20 May 2015, 16:00
Rimini (D)	0–5	Maceratese (F)	Rimini
24 May 2015, 16:00
Maceratese (F)	0–0	Robur Siena (E)	Macerata

Group 3

Team	Pld	W	D	L	GF	GA	GD	Pts
Akragas	2	1	1	0	4	1	+3	4
Lupa Castelli Romani	2	1	0	1	5	7	−2	3
Fidelis Andria	2	0	1	1	3	4	−1	1

17 May 2015, 16:00
Akragas (I)	4–1	Lupa Castelli Romani (G)	Agrigento
20 May 2015, 16:00
Lupa Castelli Romani (G)	4–3	Fidelis Andria (H)	Rocca Priora
24 May 2015, 20:30
Fidelis Andria (H)	0–0	Akragas (I)	Andria

Semi-finals

28 May 2015, 17:00
Robur Siena (B)	2–1	Castiglione (E)	Recanati
28 May 2015, 20:30
Maceratese (F)	1–3	Akragas (I)	Macerata

Final

- On neutral ground.

30 May 2015, 18:00
Robur Siena (B)	2–2 (5–3 p)	Akragas (I)	Macerata

Scudetto winners: Robur Siena

== Promotion play-off ==
Promotion playoffs involved a total of 39 teams; four from Serie D divisions A to I (teams placed from 2nd through 5th except group D which has teams placed 2nd and 4th to 6th), with the best semifinalist, the finalist and the winner of Coppa Italia Serie D that are directly respectively admitted to the fourth and fifth rounds and the semi-final.

Rules

First to third round

- The first three rounds are one-legged matches played in the home field of the best-placed team.
- The games ending in ties are extended to extra time. The higher classified team is declared the winner if the game is still tied after extra time. Penalty kicks are not taken.
- First round matches 4th & 5th-placed teams within each division (A to C and E to I only); 3rd-placed team gets a bye to the second round, awaiting 4th-5th winner. For division D, 5th & 6th-placed teams play each other; 4th-placed team also gets a bye to the second round, awaiting 5th-6th winner.
- The 2nd-placed team and the second round winner play each other in the third round.

Fourth and fifth round

- The nine winners – one each from the nine Serie D divisions – qualify with division D 8th-placer Scandicci Calcio, as the best-ranked semifinalist of Coppa Italia Serie D to the fourth round, that was played in one-legged match in the home field of the best-placed team.
- The five winners qualify with division D 3rd-placed Correggese, as the finalist of Coppa Italia Serie D to the fifth round, that is played in one-legged match in the home field of the best-placed team.
- The games ending in ties are extended to penalty kicks without playing extra time.

Semifinals and final

- The three 4th-round winners qualify for the semifinal round, joining division H 10th-placer Monopoli, as Coppa Italia Serie D winner.
- The semifinals and the final, with the respective winners, are in a one-legged match in a neutral ground.
- The games ending in ties are extended to penalty kicks without playing extra time.

Repechages

- The tournament results provide a list, starting with the winner, by which vacancies could be filled in Lega Pro.
- If the winner is not admitted to that league it gets €30,000, while the replacement (the finalist) instead gets €15,000.

First round

- Played on 16 May 2015 (groups A-B), other groups on 17 May
- Single-legged matches played at best-placed club's home field. 4th-placed team plays at home 5th-placed team (except division D, where 5th placer plays the 6th)

Team 1	Score	Team 2
Borgosesia (A4)	2-0	Caronnese (A5)
Ciserano (B4)	3-2	Virtus Verona (B5)
Belluno (C4)	3-1 (aet)	Union ArzignanoChiampo (C5)
Este (D5)	3-1	Abano (D6)
Ponsacco (E4)	1-0	Massese (E5)
Campobasso (F4)	0-3	San Nicolò (F5)
Budoni(G4)	1-1	Ostia Mare (G5)
Bisceglie (H4)	3-2 (aet)	Brindisi (H5)
Torrecuso (I4)	3-3	Neapolis (I5)

Second round

- Played on 20 May 2015
- Single-legged matches played at best-placed club's home field
- Games ending in a tie are extended to extra time; if still tied, the higher-classified team wins

Team 1	Score	Team 2
Chieri (A3)	0-6	Borgosesia (A4)
Seregno (B3)	3-1	Ciserano (B4)
Sacilese (C3)	4-1	Belluno (C4)
Piacenza (D4)	2-0	Este (D5)
Rieti (E3)	2-3	Ponsacco (E4)
Sambenedettese(F3)	0-2	San Nicolò (F5)
Olbia (G3)	3-1	Budoni (G4)
Potenza (H3)	1-0 (aet)	Bisceglie (H3)
Agropoli (I3)	6-0	Torrecuso (I4)

Third round

- Played on 24 May 2015
- Single-legged matches played at best-placed club's home field
- Games ending in a tie are extended to extra time; if still tied, the higher-classified team wins

Team 1	Score	Team 2
Sestri Levante (A2)	3-1	Borgosesia (A4)
Lecco (B2)	1-2	Seregno (B3)
Altovicentino (C2)	4-3 (aet)	Sacilese (C3)
Delta Porto Tolle (D2)	4-0	Piacenza (D4)
U.S. Poggibonsi (E2)	2-0	Ponsacco (E4)
Fano (F2)	5-1	San Nicolò (F5)
Viterbese Castrense (G2)	1-0	Olbia (G3)
Taranto (H2)	2-0	Potenza (H3)
Rende (I2)	0-0	Agropoli (I3)

Fourth round

- Played on 31 May 2015
- Single-legged matches played at best-placed club's home field
- Games ending in a tie are extended to penalty kicks without playing extra time
- Scandicci qualified directly as the best ranked semifinalist of Coppa Italia Serie D

Team 1	Score	Team 2
Fano (F2)	1-1 (4-2 p)	Scandicci (D8)
Viterbese Castrense (G2)	2-0	Poggibonsi (E2)
Altovicentino (C2)	1-2	Della Porto Tolle (D2)
Sestri Levante (A2)	2-1	Seregno (B3)
Taranto (H2)	1-0	Rende (I2)

Fifth round

- Played on 7 June 2015
- Single-legged matches played on best-placed club's home ground
- Games ending in a tie are extended to penalty kicks without play extra time
- Correggese qualified directly as the finalist of Coppa Italia Serie D

Team 1	Score	Team 2
Fano (F2)	3-0	Delta Porto Tolle (D2)
Viterbese Castrense (G2)	1-1 (2-4 p)	Taranto (H2)
Sestri Levante (A2)	2-0	Correggese (D3)

Semifinals

- Played on 10 June 2015
- On home team's ground
- Games ending in a tie are extended to penalty kicks without playing extra time
- Monopoli qualified directly as the winner of Coppa Italia Serie D

Team 1	Score	Team 2
Sestri Levante (A2)	3-1	Taranto (H2)
Fano (F2)	0-2	Monopoli (H10)

Final

- Played on 14 June 2015
- On neutral ground at Stadio Enzo Blasone, Foligno
- Game ending in a tie is extended to penalty kicks without playing extra time

Team 1	Score	Team 2
Sestri Levante (A2)	1-0	Monopoli (H10)

Admitted to Lega Pro: Monopoli

== Relegation play-off ==
- Played on 24 May 2014
- Single-legged matches played on best-placed club's home ground
- In case of tied score, extra time is played; if score is still level, best-placed team wins
- Team highlighted in green is saved, other is relegated to Eccellenza

Play-off for relegation play-out (Group F)

- Played on 17 May

Team 1	Score	Team 2
Olympia Agnonese	0-1 (aet)	Castelfidardo

Team 1	Score	Team 2
(B) Pro Sesto	1-0	Caravaggio
(C) Giorgione	2-1	Kras
(C) Dro	1-3	Triestina
(D) Fidenza	1-2	Romagna Centro
(E) Colligiana	2-0	San Donato Tavarnelle
(F) Amiternina	1-1 (aet)	Castelfidardo
(G) Palestrina	2-3	Isola Liri
(H) Pomigliano	1-0	Arzanese
(I) Noto	1-0 (aet)	Tiger Brolo
(I) Sorrento	1-2	Battipagliese
