= 2018–19 Serie D =

Serie D
- Season: 2018–19
- Champions: Avellino
- Promoted: Lecco; Como; Arzignano; Pergolettese; Modena (repecheaged); Reggio Audace (repecheaged); Pianese; Cesena; Avellino; Picerno; Bari
- Relegated: Sestri Levante; Pro Dronero; Stresa; Borgaro; Rezzato (disbanded); Darfo Boario; Ciserano; Olginatese; St. Georgen; Sandonà; Trento; Pavia; Sasso Marconi; Classe; OltrepòVoghera; Viareggio; Sinalunghese; Sangimignano; Massese; Francavilla (disbanded); Santarcangelo; Isernia; Castelfidardo; Castiadas; Lupa Roma; Anzio; Sarnese; Gragnano; Pomigliano; Granata; Gela (liquidated); Sancataldese; Locri; Rotonda; Igea Virtus

The 2018–19 Serie D was the seventy-first edition of the top level Italian non-professional football championship. It represents the fourth tier in the Italian football league system. A total of 168 teams, divided on geographical grounds into six groups of 18 teams each and three groups of 20 teams each.

== Changes from 2017–18 ==
The 2018–19 Serie D season was one of the most competitive and prestigious in the league's history, due to the presence of several teams with longstanding history in the professional leagues, which were refounded after going bankrupt in 2018. These teams include former Serie A clubs Bari, Modena, Cesena, Avellino and Reggio Audace (formerly known as Reggiana).

== Teams ==
The composition of the league's nine groups was announced on 30 August 2018. Gozzano, Pro Patria, Virtus Verona, Rimini, Imolese, Albissola, Vis Pesaro, Rieti, Potenza, Cavese and Vibonese all depart Serie D, having been promoted to Serie C.

=== Teams relegated from Serie C ===
Prato, Gavorrano and Santarcangelo joined the league, having been relegated from Serie C.

Akragas was relegated from Serie C to Serie D, but the club did not register and was put into liquidation due to financial difficulties. Fondi was relegated from Serie C, but the club merged with F.C. Aprilia. Owner Antonio Pezone transferred Fondi's sporting title to Aprilia Racing, ending Fondi's existence. F.C. Aprilia played in Serie D the previous season and earned the right to return. The merged club took the name F.C. Aprilia Racing Club and registered with the league for the current season. After the end of the previous season, Mestre attempted to enroll in Serie C for 2018–19, at the last minute. However, anticipated new financial backers walked away, citing concerns over infrastructure, and the Serie C registration was rejected. Mestre was left with no better option but to play the 2018–19 season at the Eccellenza level.

=== Refounded former professional teams ===
As part of the Article 52 of N.O.I.F. legislation, newborn clubs that explicitly represent the continuity of professional clubs who were excluded from their league can be admitted to Serie D under specific circumstances.

A record three Serie B clubs failed to register in the Italian second division for the new season and thus were readmitted as newborn clubs with different ownerships. Bari, probably the most successful one of the three, was refounded under new owner Aurelio De Laurentiis, president of Napoli after the original club renounced participation in Serie B due to financial issues. Cesena also voluntarily renounced registration at Serie B level. Since another club from Cesena, Romagna Centro, was already playing at Serie D level, it was forbidden for a newborn club to be founded and registered with the league. In order for Cesena to continue playing, Romagna Centro renamed itself A.S.D. Romagna Centro Cesena and merged with Cesena. Avellino was also excluded after losing an appeal regarding their exclusion from Serie B, and a newborn club was subsequently admitted to Serie D.

Other refounded teams admitted to Serie D include Modena, which started the 2017–18 season in Serie C but was excluded later on 6 November 2017, due to falling behind on bills, getting locked out of its stadium and missing four consecutive Serie C matches, because of its players being on strike after not being paid for several months, thus effectively dissolving the club and ending its 105-year history. A refounded version of the club, named Modena FC 2018, was allowed to join the Serie D as a phoenix club.

After the 2017–18 season, Reggiana failed to register the team in 2018–19 Serie C, after an unsuccessful attempt by owner Mike Piazza to sell a majority interest in the debt-ridden club. Reggio Audace F.C. enters Serie D as a reincarnation of A.C. Reggiana 1919.

Following the 2017–18 season, Vicenza Calcio merged with Bassano Virtus 55 S.T. with the merged club playing as L.R. Vicenza Virtus and retaining the sporting title of Bassano Virtus, resulting in the loss of Vicenza's sporting title and the dissolution of the club. A newly formed company, A.C. Vicenza 1902, requested the sporting title of Vicenza Calcio and entry into Serie D. Both requests were rejected by the Italian Football Federation, which said the club could only apply to play in Terza Categoria.

Fidelis Andria was denied registration for the 2018–19 Serie C, based on Covisoc's assessment of the club's debt situation. On the date of the deadline for Serie D registration, a group of investors led by Marco Di Vincenzo formed S.S.D. Fidelis Andria 1928 as a reincarnation of S.S. Fidelis Andria 1928 and to assume the former club's sporting title. The reborn club was admitted to Serie D.

=== Teams promoted from Eccellenza ===
Real Giulianova, Rotonda, Locri, Castrovillari, Savoia, Sorrento, Nola, Axys Zola, Savignanese, Classe, Chions, Vis Artena, Città di Anagni, Ladispoli, Fezzanese, Fanfulla, Sondrio, Adrense, Villa d'Almè, Calvina Sport, Montegiorgio, Isernia, Stresa, Pro Dronero, Città di Fasano, Castiadas, Torres, Marsala, Città di Messina, Sangimignano, Aglianese, Sinalunghese, Virtus Bolzano, St. Georgen, Bastia, Cannara, Cartigliano, Sandonà and Villafranca joined Serie D after earning promotion from Eccellenza.

=== Teams relegated to Eccellenza ===
Varesina, Varese Calcio, Derthona, Castellazzo Bormida, Lumezzane, Grumellese, Dro Alto Garda, Romanese, Montebelluna, Calvi Noale, Liventina, Abano, Castelvetro, Vivi Altotevere Sansepolcro, Correggese, Colligiana, Rignanese, Finale, Argentina, Valdinievole Montecatini, Jesina, Monticelli, Fabriano Cerreto, Nerostellati, Nuorese, Anziolavinio, Tortoli, San Teodoro, San Severo, Aversa Normanna, Manfredonia, Sporting Fulgor Molfetta, Ebolitana, Palazzolo, Paceco and Isola Capo Rizzuto departed Serie D after being relegated to Eccellenza.

=== Previous season's team not returning ===
Villabiagio participated in Serie D during the previous season and earned the right to return for this season, but the club did not register to play.

=== Merger ===
Nerostellati Frattese merged with Ercolanese and the combined organization played under the Ercolanese name. San Nicolò merged into Notaresco. Newly promoted Omnia Bitonto merged into Bitonto.

== Girone A ==
=== League table ===
Pos	Team	Pld	W	D	L	GF	GA	GD	Pts	Promotion, qualification or relegation
1	Lecco (C, P)	34	27	5	2	75	23	+52	86	Promotion to Serie C
2	Unione Sanremo	34	16	11	7	49	35	+14	59	Qualification to promotion play-offs
3	Savona	34	14	13	7	49	33	+16	55	Qualification to promotion play-offs
4	Folgore Caratese	34	14	12	8	55	39	+16	54	Qualification to promotion play-offs
5	Inveruno	34	15	9	10	59	45	+14	54	Qualification to promotion play-offs
6	Casale	34	13	15	6	40	28	+12	54	
7	Ligorna	34	13	15	6	49	40	+9	54	
8	Bra	34	13	9	12	47	45	+2	48	
9	Chieri	34	13	6	15	53	45	+8	45	
10	Lavagnese	34	10	12	12	47	48	−1	42	
11	Borgosesia	34	10	11	13	43	50	−7	41	
12	Fezzanese	34	10	11	13	40	49	−9	41	
13	Milano City	34	11	7	16	36	51	−15	40	
14	Sestri Levante (R)	34	9	11	14	36	50	−14	38	Qualification to relegation play-out
15	Arconatese	34	8	12	14	37	47	−10	36	Qualification to relegation play-out
16	Pro Dronero (R)	34	7	8	19	38	66	−28	29	Relegation to Eccellenza
17	Stresa (R)	34	6	8	20	26	49	−23	26	Relegation to Eccellenza
18	Borgaro (R)	34	7	5	22	27	63	−36	26	Relegation to Eccellenza

Updated to match(es) played on 1 June 2019. Source:
(C) Champions; (P) Promoted; (R) Relegated

== Girone B ==
=== League table ===
Pos	Team	Pld	W	D	L	GF	GA	GD	Pts	Promotion, qualification or relegation
1	Como (C, P)	34	28	5	1	68	18	+50	89	Promotion to Serie C
2	Mantova	34	26	5	3	73	27	+46	83	Qualification to promotion play-offs
3	Pro Sesto	34	21	6	7	61	42	+19	69	Qualification to promotion play-offs
4	Rezzato (D, R)	34	20	5	9	53	36	+17	65	Club disbanded
5	Caronnese	34	17	8	9	57	41	+16	59	Qualification to promotion play-offs
6	Virtus Bergamo	34	11	12	11	34	41	−7	45	
7	Sondrio	34	11	11	12	38	39	−1	44	
8	Seregno	34	11	10	13	37	42	−5	43	
9	Villa d'Almè	34	10	11	13	35	35	0	41	
10	Pontisola	34	11	7	16	51	52	−1	40	
11	Caravaggio	34	10	10	14	45	53	−8	40	
12	Scanzorosciate	34	9	12	13	35	37	−2	39	
13	Legnago Salus (Note: Legnago Salus lost the relegation play-out and was initially relegated, but then readmitted.)	34	10	8	16	38	57	−19	38	Qualification to relegation play-out
14	Darfo Boario (R)	34	8	11	15	26	46	−20	35	Qualification to relegation play-out
15	Ambrosiana	34	9	6	19	45	62	−17	33	Qualification to relegation play-out
16	Villafranca	34	6	13	15	36	44	−8	31	Qualification to relegation play-out
17	Ciserano (R)	34	6	8	20	42	68	−26	26	Relegation to Eccellenza
18	Olginatese (R)	34	3	10	21	26	60	−34	19	Relegation to Eccellenza

Updated to match(es) played on 1 June 2019. Source:
(C) Champions; (D) Disqualified; (P) Promoted; (R) Relegated

== Girone C ==
=== League table ===
Pos	Team	Pld	W	D	L	GF	GA	GD	Pts	Promotion, qualification or relegation
1	Arzignano Valchiampo (C, P)	34	21	7	6	63	35	+28	70	Promotion to Serie C
2	Adriese	34	19	11	4	70	37	+33	68	Qualification to promotion play-offs
3	Union Feltre	34	17	13	4	51	28	+23	64	Qualification to promotion play-offs
4	Campodarsego	34	16	12	6	55	40	+15	60	Qualification to promotion play-offs
5	Delta Rovigo	34	12	13	9	48	42	+6	49	Qualification to promotion play-offs
6	Virtus Bolzano	34	13	10	11	46	43	+3	49	
7	Cjarlins Muzane	34	12	10	12	63	55	+8	46	
8	Montebelluna	34	12	9	13	37	44	−7	45	
9	Este	34	9	14	11	44	47	−3	41	
10	Cartigliano	34	9	14	11	37	46	−9	41	
11	Chions	34	9	13	12	37	42	−5	40	
12	Clodiense	34	9	12	13	41	46	−5	39	
13	Belluno	34	8	14	12	33	37	−4	38	Qualification to relegation play-out
14	Tamai (Note: Tamai lost the relegation play-out and was initially relegated, but then readmitted.)	34	11	5	18	35	48	−13	38	Qualification to relegation play-out
15	Levico Terme	34	10	7	17	34	47	−13	37	Qualification to relegation play-out
16	St. Georgen (R)	34	10	6	18	30	59	−29	36	Qualification to relegation play-out
17	Sandonà (R)	34	8	11	15	37	40	−3	35	Relegation to Eccellenza
18	Trento (R)	34	5	11	18	28	53	−25	26	Relegation to Eccellenza

Updated to match(es) played on 1 June 2019. Source:
(C) Champions; (P) Promoted; (R) Relegated

== Girone D ==
=== League table ===
Pos	Team	Pld	W	D	L	GF	GA	GD	Pts	Promotion, qualification or relegation
1	Pergolettese (C, P)	34	22	7	5	62	32	+30	73	Promotion to Serie C
2	Modena (Note: Modena received the professional license of failed Palermo and Foggia, and it was consequently promoted to Serie C.) (P)	34	21	10	3	60	27	+33	73	Qualification to promotion play-offs
3	Reggio Audace (Note: ReggioAudace received the professional license of failed Palermo and Foggia, and it was consequently promoted to Serie C.) (P)	34	19	9	6	57	28	+29	66	Qualification to promotion play-offs
4	Fanfulla	34	16	9	9	58	52	+6	57	Qualification to promotion play-offs
5	Fiorenzuola	34	16	8	10	52	31	+21	56	Qualification to promotion play-offs
6	Crema	34	12	13	9	52	50	+2	49	
7	Vigor Carpaneto	34	11	14	9	42	35	+7	47	
8	Adrense	34	12	11	11	45	45	0	47	
9	Axys Zola	34	11	8	15	40	45	−5	41	
10	Ciliverghe	34	11	8	15	38	48	−10	41	
11	Lentigione	34	8	15	11	34	36	−2	39	
12	Calvina	34	8	15	11	40	51	−11	39	
13	Pavia (R)	34	9	9	16	32	46	−14	36	Qualification to relegation play-out
14	Mezzolara	34	7	14	13	39	50	−11	35	Qualification to relegation play-out
15	Sasso Marconi (R)	34	8	10	16	31	50	−19	34	Qualification to relegation play-out
16	San Marino	34	5	16	13	24	32	−8	31	Qualification to relegation play-out
17	Classe (R)	34	6	12	16	25	51	−26	30	Relegation to Eccellenza
18	OltrepòVoghera (R)	34	3	14	17	22	44	−22	23	Relegation to Eccellenza

Updated to match(es) played on 1 June 2019. Source:
(C) Champions; (P) Promoted; (R) Relegated

== Girone E ==
=== League table ===
Pos	Team	Pld	W	D	L	GF	GA	GD	Pts	Promotion, qualification or relegation
1	Pianese (C, P)	38	21	11	6	58	21	+37	74	Promotion to Serie C
2	Ponsacco	38	20	13	5	61	27	+34	73	Qualification to promotion play-offs
3	Seravezza Pozzi	38	19	8	11	62	42	+20	65	Qualification to promotion play-offs
4	Gavorrano	38	18	10	10	49	34	+15	64	Qualification to promotion play-offs
5	Aquila Montevarchi	38	18	10	10	49	38	+11	64	Qualification to promotion play-offs
6	San Donato Tavarnelle	38	16	15	7	51	32	+19	63	
7	Ghivizzano Borgo a Mozzano	38	16	12	10	50	37	+13	60	
8	Tuttocuoio	38	15	10	13	43	43	0	55	
9	Prato (Note: 1 point deducted due to financial irregularities.)	38	15	10	13	50	48	+2	54	
10	Cannara	38	12	15	11	33	38	−5	51	
11	Sporting Trestina	38	13	11	14	39	40	−1	50	
12	Aglianese	38	10	16	12	43	52	−9	46	
13	Real Forte Querceta	38	12	10	16	42	54	−12	46	
14	Sangiovannese	38	11	12	15	36	41	−5	45	
15	Bastia	38	12	9	17	45	56	−11	45	Qualification to relegation play-out
16	Scandicci	38	11	10	17	44	53	−9	43	Qualification to relegation play-out
17	Viareggio (R)	38	8	13	17	42	50	−8	37	Qualification to relegation play-out
18	Sinalunghese (R)	38	8	13	17	30	54	−24	37	Qualification to relegation play-out
19	Sangimignano (R)	38	8	12	18	22	51	−29	36	Relegation to Eccellenza
20	Massese (R)	38	2	10	26	26	64	−38	16	Relegation to Eccellenza

Updated to match(es) played on 1 June 2019. Source:
(C) Champions; (P) Promoted; (R) Relegated

== Girone F ==
=== League table ===
Pos	Team	Pld	W	D	L	GF	GA	GD	Pts	Promotion, qualification or relegation
1	Cesena F.C. (C, P)	38	25	8	5	70	29	+41	83	Promotion to Serie C
2	Matelica	38	25	5	8	74	36	+38	80	Qualification to promotion play-offs
3	Recanatese	38	15	18	5	55	35	+20	63	Qualification to promotion play-offs
4	Pineto	38	17	11	10	59	41	+18	62	Qualification to promotion play-offs
5	Sangiustese	38	15	16	7	49	39	+10	61	Qualification to promotion play-offs
6	Francavilla (D, R)	38	15	15	8	59	44	+15	60	Club disbanded
7	San Nicolò	38	14	12	12	48	43	+5	54	
8	Jesina	38	12	15	11	34	38	−4	51	
9	Montegiorgio	38	13	12	13	36	43	−7	51	
10	Sammaurese	38	12	13	13	36	48	−12	49	
11	Savignanese	38	12	12	14	43	43	0	48	
12	Città di Campobasso (Note: 3 point deducted due to financial irregularities.)	38	12	13	13	50	50	0	46	
13	Real Giulianova	38	11	11	16	35	48	−13	44	
14	Forlì	38	10	13	15	47	47	0	43	
15	Avezzano (Note: 3 point deducted due to financial irregularities.)	38	13	6	19	47	50	−3	45	Qualification to relegation play-out
16	Vastese	38	11	9	18	47	61	−14	42	Qualification to relegation play-out
17	Olympia Agnonese (Note: Olympia Agnonese lost the relegation play-out and was initially relegated, but then readmitted.)	38	8	15	15	36	47	−11	36	Qualification to relegation play-out
18	Santarcangelo (R)	38	8	13	17	41	61	−20	37	Qualification to relegation play-out
19	Isernia (R)	38	8	11	19	28	53	−25	35	Relegation to Eccellenza
20	Castelfidardo (R)	38	5	10	23	35	73	−38	25	Relegation to Eccellenza

Updated to match(es) played on 1 June 2019. Source:
(C) Champions; (D) Disqualified; (P) Promoted; (R) Relegated

== Girone G ==
=== League table ===
Pos	Team	Pld	W	D	L	GF	GA	GD	Pts	Promotion, qualification or relegation
1	Avellino (C, P)	38	26	5	7	70	36	+34	83	Promotion to Serie C
2	Lanusei	38	25	8	5	62	30	+32	83	Qualification to promotion play-offs
3	Trastevere	38	23	6	9	70	39	+31	75	Qualification to promotion play-offs
4	Sassari Latte Dolce	38	19	14	5	56	32	+24	71	Qualification to promotion play-offs
5	Cassino	38	21	6	11	65	44	+21	69	Qualification to promotion play-offs
6	Monterosi	38	20	7	11	58	39	+19	67	
7	Latina	38	15	11	12	54	39	+15	56	
8	Vis Artena	38	16	7	15	66	63	+3	55	
9	Racing Aprilia	38	16	7	15	51	48	+3	55	
10	Albalonga	38	14	12	12	63	51	+12	54	
11	S.F.F. Atletico	38	15	9	14	64	55	+9	54	
12	Flaminia	38	11	10	17	47	51	−4	43	
13	Budoni	38	11	10	17	51	60	−9	43	
14	Ladispoli	38	10	10	18	46	66	−20	40	
15	Torres	38	12	4	22	35	59	−24	40	Qualification to relegation play-out
16	Ostiamare	38	9	12	17	35	45	−10	39	Qualification to relegation play-out
17	Città di Anagni (Note: Città di Anagni lost the relegation play-out and was initially relegated, but then readmitted.)	38	8	15	15	29	42	−13	39	Qualification to relegation play-out
18	Castiadas (R)	38	8	12	18	43	62	−19	36	Qualification to relegation play-out
19	Lupa Roma (Note: 2 point deducted due to financial irregularities.) (R)	38	7	10	21	44	79	−35	29	Relegation to Eccellenza
20	Anzio (R)	38	4	5	29	29	98	−69	17	Relegation to Eccellenza

Updated to match(es) played on 1 June 2019. Source:
(C) Champions; (P) Promoted; (R) Relegated

== Girone H ==
=== League table ===
Pos	Team	Pld	W	D	L	GF	GA	GD	Pts	Promotion, qualification or relegation
1	Picerno (Note: 3 point deducted due to financial irregularities.) (C, P)	34	25	6	3	67	24	+43	78	Promotion to Serie C
2	Audace Cerignola	34	23	6	5	68	28	+40	75	Qualification to promotion play-offs
3	Taranto	34	21	8	5	65	28	+37	71	Qualification to promotion play-offs
4	Bitonto	34	17	8	9	54	31	+23	59	Qualification to promotion play-offs
5	Savoia	34	16	11	7	40	27	+13	59	Qualification to promotion play-offs
6	Fidelis Andria	34	15	11	8	37	26	+11	56	
7	Città di Fasano	34	14	8	12	58	50	+8	50	
8	Gravina	34	13	9	12	48	43	+5	48	
9	Team Altamura	34	13	8	13	43	49	−6	47	
10	Sorrento	34	12	7	15	47	50	−3	43	
11	Francavilla	34	11	10	13	30	35	−5	43	
12	Nardò	34	8	13	13	30	39	−9	37	
13	Gelbison	34	8	13	13	37	49	−12	37	Qualification to relegation play-out
14	Sarnese (R)	34	10	6	18	32	50	−18	36	Qualification to relegation play-out
15	Nola	34	11	3	20	36	55	−19	36	Qualification to relegation play-out
16	Città di Gragnano (R)	34	8	9	17	30	43	−13	33	Qualification to relegation play-out
17	Pomigliano (R)	34	4	7	23	17	59	−42	19	Relegation to Eccellenza
18	Granata (R)	34	3	5	26	21	74	−53	14	Relegation to Eccellenza

Updated to match(es) played on 1 June 2019. Source:
(C) Champions; (P) Promoted; (R) Relegated

== Girone I ==
=== League table ===
Pos	Team	Pld	W	D	L	GF	GA	GD	Pts	Promotion, qualification or relegation
1	Bari (C, P)	34	24	6	4	69	22	+47	78	Promotion to Serie C
2	Turris (Note: 2 point deducted due to financial irregularities.)	34	21	6	7	73	27	+46	67	Qualification to promotion play-offs
3	Marsala	34	14	11	9	44	30	+14	53	Qualification to promotion play-offs
4	Portici	34	13	11	10	47	46	+1	50	Qualification to promotion play-offs
5	Castrovillari	34	12	13	9	40	39	+1	49	Qualification to promotion play-offs
6	Cittanovese	34	13	8	13	55	53	+2	47	
7	Palmese	34	11	14	9	34	32	+2	47	
8	Nocerina	34	11	14	9	33	39	−6	47	
9	Acireale (Note: 1 point deducted due to financial irregularities.)	34	13	8	13	50	51	−1	46	
10	Troina	34	10	15	9	34	35	−1	45	
11	Città di Gela (D, R)	34	12	8	14	49	50	−1	44	Club disbanded
12	Messina	34	11	10	13	40	44	−4	43	
13	Sancataldese (R)	34	11	9	14	52	51	+1	42	Qualification to relegation play-out
14	Città di Messina	34	11	7	16	32	50	−18	40	Qualification to relegation play-out
15	Locri (R)	34	11	6	17	41	60	−19	39	Qualification to relegation play-out
16	Roccella	34	8	14	12	32	46	−14	38	Qualification to relegation play-out
17	Rotonda (R)	34	8	7	19	33	47	−14	31	Relegation to Eccellenza
18	Igea Virtus (R)	34	4	9	21	16	52	−36	21	Relegation to Eccellenza

Updated to match(es) played on 1 June 2019. Source:
(C) Champions; (D) Disqualified; (P) Promoted; (R) Relegated

== Scudetto Serie D ==
The nine group winners enter a tournament which determines the overall Serie D champions and the winner is awarded the Scudetto Serie D.

=== First round ===
- division winners placed into 3 groups of 3
- group winners and best second-placed team qualify for semi-finals
- rank in Discipline Cup and head-to-head will break a tie or ties in points for the top position in a group

Group 1
Team	Pld	W	D	L	GF	GA	GD	Pts
Lecco	2	1	1	0	5	4	+1	4
Como	2	0	2	0	3	3	0	2
Arzignano Valchiampo	2	0	1	1	1	2	−1	1

12 May 2019
Arzignano Valchiampo (C)	0–0	Como (B)	Arzignano
18 May 2019
Lecco (A)	2–1	Arzignano Valchiampo (C)	Lecco
22 May 2019
Como (B)	3–3	Lecco (A)	Como

Group 2
Team	Pld	W	D	L	GF	GA	GD	Pts
Romagna Centro Cesena	2	2	0	0	4	1	+3	6
Pergolettese	2	1	0	1	3	4	−1	3
Pianese	2	0	0	2	1	3	−2	0

12 May 2019
Pianese (E)	0–1	Romagna Centro Cesena (F)	Piancastagnaio
19 May 2019
Pergolettese (D)	2-1	Pianese (E)	Crema
22 May 2019
Romagna Centro Cesena (F)	3–1	Pergolettese (D)	Cesena

Group 3
Team	Pld	W	D	L	GF	GA	GD	Pts
Avellino	2	2	0	0	2	0	+2	6
Bari	2	0	1	1	0	1	−1	1
Picerno	2	0	1	1	0	1	−1	1

12 May 2019
Bari (I)	0–0	Picerno (H)	Bari
19 May 2019
Avellino (G)	1–0	Bari (I)	Avellino
22 May 2019
Picerno (H)	0–1	Avellino (G)	Picerno

=== Semi-finals ===
- On neutral ground.

31 May 2019
Romagna Centro Cesena (F)	0-2	Lecco (A)	Foligno
31 May 2019
Avellino (G)	3-0	Pergolettese (D)	Gubbio

=== Final ===
- On neutral ground.

2 June 2019
Lecco (A)	1-1 (0–2 pen.)	Avellino (G)	Perugia

Scudetto winners: Avellino
