= 2012–13 Lega Pro Seconda Divisione =

Lega Pro Seconda Divisione
- Season: 2012-13
- Champions: Pro Patria (group A); Salernitana (group B)
- Promoted: Pro Patria, Savona, Venezia FC (group A); Salernitana, Pontedera, L'Aquila (group B)
- Relegated: Vallée d'Aoste, Fano, Casale, Milazzo (group A); HinterReggio, Gavorrano, Foligno, Aversa Normanna, Fondi (group B)

The 2012–13 Lega Pro Seconda Divisione season was the thirty-fifth football league season of Italian Lega Pro Seconda Divisione since its establishment in 1978, and the fifth since the renaming from Serie C to Lega Pro.

It will be divided into two phases: the regular season, and the playoff phase.

The league currently would be composed of 36 teams divided into two divisions (Girone A and B) divided geographically, with the exception of the Sicilian team Milazzo that plays in group A, each composed of 18 teams.

Teams finishing first and second in the regular season, plus one team winning the playoff round from each division will be promoted to Lega Pro Prima Divisione. The last three teams in the regular season, plus one relegation play-out loser from each division will be relegated to Serie D. The two relegation play-out winners, one from each division, will play each other and the loser will become the ninth team relegated. In all, six teams will be promoted to Lega Pro Prima Divisione, and nine teams will be relegated to Serie D.

== Girone A ==
=== Teams ===
Teams from Aosta Valley, Emilia-Romagna, Liguria, Lombardy, Piedmont, Sicily & Veneto

Location of teams in Girone A 2012–13

Club	City	Stadium	Capacity	2011–12 season
Alessandria	Alessandria	Giuseppe Moccagatta	5,827	11th in Lega Pro Seconda Divisione A
Bassano Virtus	Bassano del Grappa	Rino Mercante	2,952	18th in Lega Pro Prima Divisione B
Bellaria Igea	Bellaria-Igea Marina	Enrico Nanni	2,500	14th in Lega Pro Seconda Divisione A
Casale	Casale Monferrato	Natale Palli	4,000	4th in Lega Pro Seconda Divisione A
Castiglione	Castiglione delle Stiviere	Ugo Lusetti	2,500	1st in Serie D Girone B (as Sterilgarda Castiglione)
Fano	Fano	Raffaele Mancini	8,800	10th in Lega Pro Seconda Divisione B
Forlì	Forlì	Tullo Morgagni	3,466	1st in Serie D Girone D
Giacomense	Masi Torello (playing in Portomaggiore)	Savino Bellini	2,500	15th in Lega Pro Seconda Divisione A
Mantova	Mantova	Danilo Martelli	14,884	16th in Lega Pro Seconda Divisione A
Milazzo	Milazzo	Grotta Polifemo	2,500	15th in Lega Pro Seconda Divisione B
Monza	Monza	Brianteo	18,568	17th in Lega Pro Prima Divisione A
Pro Patria	Busto Arsizio	Carlo Speroni	4,627	7th in Lega Pro Seconda Divisione A
Renate	Renate (playing in Meda)	Città di Meda	3,000	12th in Lega Pro Seconda Divisione A
Rimini	Rimini	Romeo Neri	7,442	6th in Lega Pro Seconda Divisione A
Santarcangelo	Santarcangelo di Romagna	Valentino Mazzola	3,000	8th in Lega Pro Seconda Divisione A
Savona	Savona	Valerio Bacigalupo	4,000	13th in Lega Pro Seconda Divisione A
SC Vallée d’Aoste	Saint-Christophe (playing in San Giusto Canavese)	Franco Cerutti	2,500	1st in Serie D Girone A (as V.d.A. Saint-Christophe)
Venezia	Venice	Pier Luigi Penzo	7,450	1st in Serie D Girone C

=== League table ===
Pos	Team	Pld	W	D	L	GF	GA	GD	Pts	Qualification or relegation
1	Pro Patria (P)	34	18	8	8	64	37	+27	62	Promotion to Prima Divisione
2	Savona (P)	34	18	6	10	51	33	+18	60	Promotion to Prima Divisione
3	Venezia (O, P)	34	16	11	7	58	47	+11	59	Qualification for Promotion play-off
4	Bassano Virtus	34	16	10	8	54	34	+20	58	Qualification for Promotion play-off
5	Monza	34	17	12	5	57	34	+23	57 (Note: REN 2-1 MON; MON 2-1 REN) (Note: Monza was docked 6 points: 4 points due to the 2011 Italian football scandal and 2 points due to financial irregularities.)	Qualification for Promotion play-off
6	Renate	34	18	3	13	61	46	+15	57	Qualification for Promotion play-off
7	Castiglione	34	14	10	10	39	29	+10	52 (Note: ALE 0-1 CAS; CAS 0-0 ALE)	
8	Alessandria	34	14	10	10	41	30	+11	52	
9	Mantova	34	13	9	12	45	52	−7	48	
10	Forlì	34	13	9	12	48	33	+15	47 (Note: Forlì was docked 1 point due to violation of the National Licensing System.)	
11	Giacomense	34	12	8	14	44	48	−4	44	Renaming as S.P.A.L. 2013 after the merger (Note: Giacomense moved to the city of Ferrara and merged with Real Spal. It will play in the italian football as S.P.A.L. 2013.)
12	Santarcangelo	34	10	13	11	39	41	−2	43	
13	Bellaria Igea	34	10	12	12	41	50	−9	42	
14	Rimini	34	8	13	13	37	37	0	37	Qualification for Relegation play-off
15	Vallée d’Aoste (R)	34	9	9	16	37	61	−24	35 (Note: Fano and Vallée d’Aoste were docked 1 point due to financial irregularities.)	Qualification for Relegation play-off
16	Fano (R)	34	8	8	18	42	68	−26	31	Relegation to Serie D
17	Casale (R)	34	7	8	19	32	51	−19	24 (Note: Casale was docked 5 points due to financial irregularities.)	Relegation to Promozione (Note: Casale didn't enroll in the next Serie D championship and will be relegated to Promozione.)
18	Milazzo (R)	34	0	11	23	18	77	−59	11	Didn't enroll in the next championship (Note: Milazzo didn't enroll in the next championship and disappeared from the Italian football.)

Updated to match(es) played on 12 May 2013. Source:
Rules for classification: 1) points; 2) goal difference; 3) number of goals scored.
(O) Play-off winners; (P) Promoted; (R) Relegated

=== Promotion Playoffs ===
==== Semifinals ====
First legs scheduled 26 May 2013; return legs scheduled 1, 2 June 2013

Team 1	Agg.	Team 2	1st leg	2nd leg
Renate (6)	1–2	(3) Venezia	1–1	0–1
Monza (5)	3–1	(4) Bassano Virtus	1–0	2–1

==== Final ====
First leg scheduled 9 June 2013; return leg scheduled 16 June 2013

Team 1	Agg.	Team 2	1st leg	2nd leg
Monza (5)	2–3	(3) Venezia	0–0	2–3

== Girone B ==
=== Teams ===
Teams from Abruzzo, Apulia, Basilicata, Calabria, Campania, Lazio, Molise, Tuscany & Umbria

Location of teams in Girone B 2012–13

Club	City	Stadium	Capacity	2011–12 season
Aprilia	Aprilia	Quinto Ricci	2,000	5th in Lega Pro Seconda Divisione B
Arzanese	Arzano (playing in Frattamaggiore)	Pasquale Ianniello	4,000	9th in Lega Pro Seconda Divisione B
Aversa Normanna	Aversa	Augusto Bisceglia	2,555	11th in Lega Pro Seconda Divisione B
Borgo a Buggiano	Buggiano	Alberto Benedetti	2,000	10th in Lega Pro Seconda Divisione A
Campobasso	Campobasso	Romagnoli	4,000	13th in Lega Pro Seconda Divisione B
Chieti	Chieti	Guido Angelini	12,750	4th in Lega Pro Seconda Divisione B
Foligno	Foligno	Enzo Blasone	5,650	18th in Lega Pro Prima Divisione A
Fondi	Fondi	Domenico Purificato	2,500	12th in Lega Pro Seconda Divisione B
Gavorrano	Gavorrano	Romeo Malservisi	2,000	7th in Lega Pro Seconda Divisione B
HinterReggio	Reggio Calabria	Oreste Granillo	27,543	1st in Serie D Girone I
L'Aquila	L'Aquila	Tommaso Fattori	10,000	8th in Lega Pro Seconda Divisione B
Martina Franca	Martina Franca	Gian Domenico Tursi	5,000	1st in Serie D Girone H
Melfi	Melfi	Arturo Valerio	4,100	16th in Lega Pro Seconda Divisione B
Poggibonsi	Poggibonsi	Stefano Lotti	2,513	9th in Lega Pro Seconda Divisione A
Pontedera	Pontedera	Ettore Mannucci	5,000	1st in Serie D Girone E
Salernitana	Salerno	Arechi	37,245	1st in Serie D Girone G(as Salerno)
Teramo	Teramo	Comunale	7,498	1st in Serie D Girone F
Vigor Lamezia	Lamezia Terme	Guido D'Ippolito	4,000	3rd in Lega Pro Seconda Divisione B

=== League table ===
Pos	Team	Pld	W	D	L	GF	GA	GD	Pts	Promotion or relegation
1	Salernitana (C, P)	34	20	10	4	59	33	+26	70	Promotion to Prima Divisione
2	Pontedera (P)	34	17	11	6	49	32	+17	62	Promotion to Prima Divisione
3	Aprilia	34	16	9	9	46	32	+14	57	Qualification for Promotion play-off
4	Chieti	34	15	10	9	43	34	+9	54 (Note: CHI 0-1 LAQ; LAQ 1-2 CHI) (Note: Chieti was docked 1 point due to financial irregularities.)	Qualification for Promotion play-off
5	L'Aquila (O, P)	34	14	12	8	42	33	+9	54	Qualification for Promotion play-off
6	Teramo	34	15	8	11	43	33	+10	53 (Note: TER 2-1 POG; POG 2-1 TER)	Qualification for Promotion play-off
7	Poggibonsi	34	14	11	9	41	31	+10	53	
8	Melfi	34	11	12	11	30	29	+1	45	
9	Borgo a Buggiano (R)	34	9	17	8	41	35	+6	44 (Note: BOR: 8 pts; ARZ: 5 pts; CAM: 2 pts)	Relegation to Terza Categoria (Note: Borgo a Buggiano didn't enroll in the next championship and will be relegated to Terza Categoria.)
10	Arzanese	34	11	11	12	39	39	0	44	
11	Campobasso (R)	34	12	10	12	35	37	−2	44 (Note: Campobasso was docked 2 points due to financial irregularities.)	Relegation to Eccellenza (Note: Campobasso didn't enroll in the next championship and will be relegated to Eccellenza.)
12	Martina Franca	34	10	13	11	32	40	−8	43	
13	Vigor Lamezia	34	9	15	10	26	24	+2	42 (Note: VIG 1-0 HIN; HIN 0-2 VIG)	
14	HinterReggio (R)	34	11	9	14	35	36	−1	42	Qualification for Relegation play-off
15	Gavorrano	34	10	11	13	41	42	−1	41 (Note: GAV 1-1 FOL; FOL 0-0 GAV)	Qualification for Relegation play-off Remained in Seconda Divisione (Note: Gavorrano and Aversa Normanna remained in the league to fill the vacancies created.)
16	Foligno (R)	34	10	11	13	32	38	−6	41	Relegation to Serie D
17	Aversa Normanna	34	3	6	25	26	69	−43	15 (Note: AVE 3-0 FON; FON 2-0 AVE)	Remained in Seconda Divisione
18	Fondi (R)	34	3	6	25	27	70	−43	15	Relegation to Serie D

Updated to match(es) played on 12 May 2013. Source:
Rules for classification: 1) points; 2) goal difference; 3) number of goals scored.
(C) Champions; (O) Play-off winners; (P) Promoted; (R) Relegated

=== Promotion Playoffs ===
==== Semifinals ====
First legs scheduled 26 May 2013; return legs scheduled 2 June 2013

Team 1	Agg.	Team 2	1st leg	2nd leg
Teramo (6)	2–1	(3) Aprilia	1–1	1–0
L'Aquila (5)	2–1	(4) Chieti	2–0	0–1

==== Final ====
First leg scheduled 9 June 2013; return leg scheduled 16 June 2013

Team 1	Agg.	Team 2	1st leg	2nd leg
Teramo (6)	1–3	(5) L'Aquila	0–1	1–2

== Relegation play-off ==
- only Finals winner is saved from relegation
- other 3 teams are relegated to Serie D

=== Semifinals ===
==== Girone A ====
First legs scheduled 26 May 2013; return legs scheduled 2 June 2013

Team 1	Agg.	Team 2	1st leg	2nd leg
Vallée d’Aoste (15)	0–4	(14) Rimini	0–2	0–2

Vallée d’Aoste relegated to Serie D.

==== Girone B ====
First legs scheduled 26 May 2013; return legs scheduled 2 June 2013

Team 1	Agg.	Team 2	1st leg	2nd leg
Gavorrano (15)	4–3	(14) HinterReggio	2–1	2–2

HinterReggio relegated to Serie D

=== Final ===
First leg scheduled 9 June 2012; return leg scheduled 16 June 2012

Team 1	Agg.	Team 2	1st leg	2nd leg
Gavorrano (B 15)	1–5	(A 14) Rimini	0–3	1–2

Gavorrano relegated to Serie D

== Supercup ==
- Pro Patria – Salernitana 0–3
- Salernitana – Pro Patria 2–1

Salernitana Champions of C2.
