= Domenico Girardi =

Italian footballer (born 1985)

Personal information
- Date of birth: 2 May 1985 (age 41)
- Place of birth: Terzigno, Italy
- Height: 1.85 m (6 ft 1 in)
- Position: Striker

Team information
- Current team: svincolato

Youth career
- Salernitana

Senior career*
Years	Team	Apps	(Gls)
2002–2004	Salernitana	5	(0)
2004–2005	Bellaria Igea	24	(3)
2005–2006	Benevento	25	(4)
2006–2007	Prato	30	(11)
2007–2011	Chievo	0	(0)
2007–2008	→ Foligno (loan)	27	(10)
2008–2009	→ Verona (loan)	26	(6)
2009–2010	→ Modena (loan)	22	(2)
2011	→ Taranto (loan)	13	(4)
2011–2012	Taranto	29	(6)
2012–2013	Paganese	26	(7)
2013–2014	Matera		
2014	Cuneo	8	(1)
2014–2015	Paganese	31	(5)
2015–2016	AlbinoLeffe	28	(3)
2016–2017	Nocerina 1910	25	(10)
2017–2018	Cavese	28	(8)
2018–	Pomigliano	0	(0)

International career^{‡}
2001	Italy U-15	6	(2)
2003	Italy U-18	2	(0)
2003	Italy U-19	4	(0)
- * Club domestic league appearances and goals ‡ National team caps and goals as of 7 October 2018

Domenico Girardi (born 2 May 1985 in Terzigno) is an Italian professional football player currently playing for Pomigliano.
