= 2013–14 Lega Pro Seconda Divisione =

Seconda Divisione
- Season: 2013–14

The 2013–14 Seconda Divisione season is the thirty-sixth and final football league season of Italian Serie C2 since its establishment in 1978, and the sixth since the renaming from Serie C to Lega Pro.

It is divided into two phases: the regular season, and the playoff phase.

The league currently is composed of 36 teams divided into two divisions (Girone A and B) divided geographically.

The first eight teams in each girone, plus one team winning the relegation playoff round from each division will remain in Lega Pro. The last six teams in each girone, plus three relegation play-out losers from each division will be relegated to Serie D. In all, eighteen teams will remain in Lega Pro, and eighteen teams will be relegated to Serie D.

== Start of season ==
Given a normal season where there are no team failures and special promotions, Lega Pro Seconda Divisione would feature 6 teams that had been relegated from Lega Pro Prima Divisione, 9 teams that had been promoted from Serie D, and 21 teams had played in Lega Pro Seconda Divisione the year before. Due to seven bankruptcies and non-admissions in Lega Pro Prima Divisione (one vacancy), Lega Pro Seconda Divisione (six vacancies) and Serie D (one vacancy: Sambenedettese of Girone F) the 2013–14 season is to feature only 2 teams that played in 2012–13 Lega Pro Prima Divisione, 13 teams that played in 2012–13 Serie D and 21 teams that played in 2012–13 Lega Pro Seconda Divisione. The league admitted seven teams to fill vacancies created. These teams are:

- Gavorrano which finished 15th in Lega Pro Seconda Divisione B, originally relegated for losing in the playoffs.
- Aversa Normanna which finished 17th in Lega Pro Seconda Divisione B, originally relegated for finishing at the penultimate place.
- Virtus Verona which finished 4th in Serie D Girone C, and was the playoff winner.
- Real Vicenza which finished 5th in Serie D Girone C.
- Casertana which finished 4th in Serie D Girone G, and was the playoff runner-up.
- Foggia which finished 5th in Serie D Girone H.
- Cosenza which finished 2nd in Serie D Girone I.

Also, SPAL came back through a merger with Giacomense.

== Girone A ==
=== Teams ===
Teams from Emilia-Romagna, Liguria, Lombardy, Piedmont, Sardinia & Veneto

Location of teams in Girone A 2013–14

Club	City	Stadium	Capacity	2012–13 season
Alessandria	Alessandria	Giuseppe Moccagatta	5,827	8th in Lega Pro Seconda Divisione A
Bassano Virtus	Bassano del Grappa	Rino Mercante	2,952	4th in Lega Pro Seconda Divisione A
Bellaria Igea	Bellaria-Igea Marina	Enrico Nanni	2,500	13th in Lega Pro Seconda Divisione A
Bra	Bra	Attilio Bravi	1,000	1st in Serie D Girone A
Castiglione	Castiglione delle Stiviere	Ugo Lusetti	2,500	7th in Lega Pro Seconda Divisione A
Cuneo	Cuneo	Fratelli Paschiero	4,000	14th in Lega Pro Prima Divisione A
Delta Porto Tolle	Porto Tolle	Comunale	3,000	1st in Serie D Girone C
Forlì	Forlì	Tullo Morgagni	3,466	10th in Lega Pro Seconda Divisione A
Mantova	Mantova	Danilo Martelli	14,884	9th in Lega Pro Seconda Divisione A
Monza	Monza	Brianteo	18,568	5th in Lega Pro Seconda Divisione A
Pergolettese	Crema	Giuseppe Voltini	4,100	1st in Serie D Girone B
Real Vicenza	Vicenza	Romeo Menti	12,200	5th in Serie D Girone C
Renate	Renate (playing in Meda)	Città di Meda	3,000	6th in Lega Pro Seconda Divisione A
Rimini	Rimini	Romeo Neri	7,442	14th in Lega Pro Seconda Divisione A
Santarcangelo	Santarcangelo di Romagna	Valentino Mazzola	3,000	12th in Lega Pro Seconda Divisione A
SPAL	Ferrara	Paolo Mazza	19,000	11th Lega Pro Seconda Divisione/A (as Giacomense)
Torres	Sassari	Vanni Sanna	7,480	1st in Serie D Girone G
Virtus Verona	Verona (playing in Legnago)	Mario Sandrini	2,152	4th in Serie D Girone C

=== League table ===
Pos	Team	Pld	W	D	L	GF	GA	GD	Pts	Promotion or relegation
1	Bassano Virtus (C, P)	34	20	9	5	62	35	+27	69	Promotion to 2014-15 Lega Pro
2	Renate (P)	34	15	12	7	43	26	+17	57 (Note: REN 0–0 ALE; ALE 0–3 REN)	Promotion to 2014-15 Lega Pro
3	Alessandria (P)	34	16	9	9	58	39	+19	57	Promotion to 2014-15 Lega Pro
4	Monza (P)	33	15	9	9	56	41	+15	54	Promotion to 2014-15 Lega Pro
5	Santarcangelo (P)	34	13	14	7	44	26	+18	53 (Note: SAN 2–0 SPAL; SPAL 1–0 SAN)	Promotion to 2014-15 Lega Pro
6	SPAL (P)	34	13	14	7	52	42	+10	53	Promotion to 2014-15 Lega Pro
7	Real Vicenza (P)	34	15	7	12	51	48	+3	52 (Note: RVI 4–1 MAN; MAN 0–0 RVI)	Promotion to 2014-15 Lega Pro
8	Mantova (P)	34	13	13	8	57	46	+11	52	Promotion to 2014-15 Lega Pro
9	Forlì (O, P)	34	14	7	13	53	45	+8	49	Qualification for plan-off
10	Delta Porto Tolle (R)	34	12	12	10	45	35	+10	48	Qualification for plan-off
11	Cuneo (R)	34	11	14	9	43	32	+11	47 (Note: TOR 1–3 CUN; CUN 0–1 TOR)	Qualification for plan-off
12	Torres (T, P)	34	12	11	11	40	44	−4	47	Spared from relegation (Note: Re-admitted to fill vacancy)
13	Rimini (R)	34	11	13	10	38	38	0	45 (Note: Bellaria Igea and Rimini were docked 1 point.)	Relegation to 2014-15 Serie D
14	Virtus Verona (R)	34	10	14	10	35	32	+3	44	Relegation to 2014-15 Serie D
15	Pergolettese (R)	34	7	15	12	27	35	−8	36	Relegation to 2014-15 Serie D
16	Castiglione (R)	34	6	12	16	37	54	−17	30	Relegation to 2014-15 Serie D
17	Bellaria Igea (R)	34	4	4	26	24	79	−55	15	Relegation to 2014-15 Serie D
18	Bra (R)	34	3	3	28	29	96	−67	12	Relegation to 2014-15 Serie D

Updated to match(es) played on 4 May 2014. Source: Lega Pro
Rules for classification: 1) points; 2) goal difference; 3) number of goals scored.
(C) Champions; (O) Play-off winners; (P) Promoted; (R) Relegated; (T) Qualified, but not yet for the particular phase indicated

== Relegation play-off ==
- only Finals winner remains in Lega Pro
- other 3 teams are relegated to Serie D

=== Semifinals ===
First legs scheduled 18 May 2014; return legs scheduled 25 May 2014
In case of a tie in the aggregate score the highest classified team advances to the final.

Team 1	Agg.	Team 2	1st leg	2nd leg
Torres (12)	1–3	(9) Forlì	1–0	0–3
Cuneo (11)	2–2(hc)	(10) Delta Porto Tolle	1–2	1–0

=== Finals ===
First leg scheduled 1 June 2014; return leg scheduled 8 June 2014

Team 1	Agg.	Team 2	1st leg	2nd leg
Delta Porto Tolle (10)	4–4 (hc)	(9) Forlì	3–2	1–2

- Forlì remains in Lega Pro

== Girone B ==
=== Teams ===
Teams from Abruzzo, Apulia, Basilicata, Campania, Lazio, Sicily, Tuscany & Umbria

Location of teams in Girone B 2013–14
Location of teams in Girone B 2013–14 (Campania)

Club	City	Stadium	Capacity	2012–13 season
Aprilia	Aprilia	Quinto Ricci	2,000	3rd in Lega Pro Seconda Divisione B
Arzanese	Arzano (playing in Mugnano di Napoli)	Alberto Vallefuoco	2,500	10th in Lega Pro Seconda Divisione B
Aversa Normanna	Aversa	Augusto Bisceglia	2,555	17th in Lega Pro Seconda Divisione B
Casertana	Caserta	Alberto Pinto	12,000	4th in Serie D Girone G
Castel Rigone	Passignano sul Trasimeno	San Bartolomeo	800	1st in Serie D Girone E
Chieti	Chieti	Guido Angelini	12,750	4th in Lega Pro Seconda Divisione B
Cosenza	Cosenza	San Vito	24,479	2nd in Serie D Girone I
Foggia	Foggia	Pino Zaccheria	25,000	5th in Serie D Girone H
Gavorrano	Gavorrano	Romeo Malservisi	2,000	15th in Lega Pro Seconda Divisione B
Ischia	Ischia	Vincenzo Mazzella	5,000	1st in Serie D Girone H
Martina Franca	Martina Franca	Gian Domenico Tursi	5,000	12th in Lega Pro Seconda Divisione B
Melfi	Melfi	Arturo Valerio	4,100	8th in Lega Pro Seconda Divisione B
Messina	Messina	San Filippo	37,895	1st in Serie D Girone I
Poggibonsi	Poggibonsi	Stefano Lotti	2,513	7th in Lega Pro Seconda Divisione B
Sorrento	Sorrento	Italia	3,600	15th in Lega Pro Prima Divisione A
Teramo	Teramo	Gaetano Bonolis	7,498	6th in Lega Pro Seconda Divisione B
Tuttocuoio	San Miniato (playing in Santa Croce sull'Arno)	Libero Masini	3,344	1st in Serie D Girone D
Vigor Lamezia	Lamezia Terme	Guido D'Ippolito	4,000	13th in Lega Pro Seconda Divisione B

=== League table ===
Pos	Team	Pld	W	D	L	GF	GA	GD	Pts	Promotion or relegation
1	Messina (P)	34	15	12	7	43	33	+10	57 (Note: CAS 1–1 MES; MES 2–1 CAS)	Promotion to 2014-15 Lega Pro
2	Casertana (P)	34	15	12	7	38	28	+10	57	Promotion to 2014-15 Lega Pro
3	Teramo (P)	34	15	10	9	48	34	+14	55 (Note: TER 3–0 COS; COS 1–1 TER)	Promotion to 2014-15 Lega Pro
4	Cosenza (P)	34	15	10	9	38	29	+9	55	Promotion to 2014-15 Lega Pro
5	Foggia (P)	34	13	12	9	50	40	+10	51 (Note: MEL 0–0 FOG; FOG 2–2 MEL)	Promotion to 2014-15 Lega Pro
6	Melfi (P)	34	12	15	7	39	31	+8	51	Promotion to 2014-15 Lega Pro
7	Ischia (P)	34	11	15	8	31	29	+2	48	Promotion to 2014-15 Lega Pro
8	Vigor Lamezia (P)	34	12	10	12	37	39	−2	46	Promotion to 2014-15 Lega Pro
9	Sorrento (R)	34	13	6	15	40	36	+4	45	Qualification for play-off
10	Tuttocuoio (O, P)	34	11	11	12	41	38	+3	44	Qualification for play-off
11	Aversa Normanna (T, P)	34	11	10	13	36	40	−4	43 (Note: ARZ 0–1 AVN; AVN 1–1 ARZ)	Spared from relegation (Note: Re-admitted to fill vacancy)
12	Arzanese (R)	34	10	13	11	41	46	−5	43	Qualification for play-off
13	Martina Franca (T, P)	34	10	12	12	36	36	0	42	Spared from relegation
14	Aprilia (R)	34	10	11	13	41	50	−9	41	Relegation to 2014-15 Serie D
15	Chieti (R)	34	10	11	13	34	35	−1	40 (Note: Chieti was docked 1 point.)	Relegation to 2014-15 Serie D
16	Poggibonsi (R)	34	8	12	14	31	41	−10	36	Relegation to 2014-15 Serie D
17	Castel Rigone (R, E)	34	10	4	20	39	56	−17	34	Folded after relegation (Note: Castel Rigone folded after it decided not to play in Serie D.)
18	Gavorrano (R)	34	6	12	16	24	48	−24	30	Relegation to 2014-15 Serie D

Updated to match(es) played on 4 May 2014. Source: Lega Pro
Rules for classification: 1) points; 2) goal difference; 3) number of goals scored.
(E) Eliminated; (O) Play-off winners; (P) Promoted; (R) Relegated; (T) Qualified, but not yet for the particular phase indicated

== Relegation play-off ==
- only Finals winner remains in Lega Pro
- other 3 teams are relegated to Serie D

=== Semifinals ===
First legs scheduled 18 May 2014; return legs scheduled 25 May 2014

Team 1	Agg.	Team 2	1st leg	2nd leg
Arzanese (12)	4–3	(9) Sorrento	4–0	0–3
Aversa Normanna (11)	1–3	(10) Tuttocuoio	1–1	0–2

=== Finals ===
First leg scheduled 1 June 2014; return leg scheduled 8 June 2014

Team 1	Agg.	Team 2	1st leg	2nd leg
Arzanese (12)	1–1 (hc)	(10) Tuttocuoio	0–0	1–1

- Tuttocuoio remains in Lega Pro

== Supercup ==
- Bassano Virtus – Messina 2–0
- Messina – Bassano Virtus 1–2
