= Eccellenza Campania =

- Organising body: Lega Nazionale Dilettanti
- Founded: 1991
- Country: Italy
- Confederation: UEFA
- Divisions: 2
- Number of clubs: 36
- Promotion to: Serie D
- Relegation to: Promozione Campania
- League cup: Coppa Italia Dilettanti
- Current champions: Afragolese (Group A); Heraclea(Group B) (2024–25)
- Most championships: Ebolitana, Ercolano, Savoia (3 titles each)
- Website: http://www.lnd.it

Eccellenza Campania is the regional Eccellenza football league for clubs in the Southern Italian region of Campania, Italy. It is composed of 32 teams, divided into divisions A and B, which are 2 of the 28 total Eccellenza divisions in all of Italy. The two winners of the divisions are automatically promoted to Serie D. The two clubs that finish second are entered into a national play-off at the end of the regular season for a chance to gain one of seven Serie D promotions to the survivors of two rounds of double-leg ties.

== Champions ==
Here are the past champions of the Campania Eccellenza, organised into their respective group.

=== Group A ===
- 1991–92 Gabbiano Napoli
- 1992–93 Portici
- 1993–94 Boys Caivanese
- 1994–95 Giugliano
- 1995–96 Arzanese
- 1996–97 Sant'Anastasia
- 1997–98 Viribus Unitis
- 1998–99 Pro Sangiuseppese
- 1999–2000 Ercolano
- 2000–01 Gladiator
- 2001–02 Savoia
- 2002–03 Ercolano
- 2003–04 Acerrana
- 2004–05 El Brazil
- 2005–06 Ischia Benessere
- 2006–07 Caserta
- 2007–08 Pianura
- 2008–09 Casertana
- 2009–10 Atletico Nola
- 2010–11 Campania
- 2011–12 Savoia
- 2012–13 Marcianise
- 2013–14 Nerostellati Frattese
- 2014–15 Turris
- 2015–16 Herculaneum (Ercolano)
- 2016–17 Portici
- 2017–18 Savoia
- 2018–19 Giugliano
- 2019–20 Afragolese
- 2020–21 San Giorgio
- 2021–22 Palmese
- 2022–23 Ischia
- 2023–24 Acerrana
- 2024–25 Afragolese

=== Group B ===
- 1991–92 Paganese
- 1992–93 Nocerina
- 1993–94 Cavese
- 1994–95 Giovani Lauro
- 1995–96 Pro Ebolitana
- 1996–97 Angri 1927
- 1997–98 Sorrento
- 1998–99 Real Paganese
- 1999–00 Scafatese
- 2000–01 Angri 1927
- 2001–02 Ariano Irpino
- 2002–03 Spigolatrice Sapri
- 2003–04 Scafatese
- 2004–05 Pro Ebolitana
- 2005–06 Sant'Antonio Abate
- 2006–07 Comprensorio Gelbison
- 2007–08 Città di Vico Equense
- 2008–09 Forza e Coraggio
- 2009–10 Battipagliese
- 2010–11 Serre Alburni
- 2011–12 Agropoli
- 2012–13 Vico Equense
- 2013–14 Virtus Scafatese
- 2014–15 Gragnano
- 2015–16 Città di Nocera
- 2016–17 Ebolitana
- 2017–18 Sorrento
- 2018–19 San Tommaso
- 2019–20 Santa Maria Cilento
- 2020–21 Mariglianese
- 2021–22 Puteolana
- 2022–23 San Marzano
- 2023–24 Sarnese
- 2024–25 Heraclea
