= Claudio Sparacello =

Italian footballer (born 1995)

Personal information
- Date of birth: 19 April 1995 (age 31)
- Place of birth: Palermo, Italy
- Height: 1.87 m (6 ft 1 1/2 in)
- Position: Forward

Team information
- Current team: Pistoiese
- Number: 95

Youth career
- –2012: Palermo
- 2012–2014: Torino

Senior career*
Years	Team	Apps	(Gls)
2013	Torino	0	(0)
2013	→ Ancona (loan)	2	(0)
2014	Maceratese	6	(1)
2014–2015	Tiger Brolo	27	(7)
2015–2017	Trapani	7	(0)
2016	→ Padova (loan)	11	(2)
2016–2017	→ Südtirol (loan)	19	(2)
2017	→ Pistoiese (loan)	10	(0)
2017–2018	Reggina	31	(2)
2018–2019	Virtus Francavilla	14	(0)
2019	Teramo	17	(1)
2019–2020	Picerno	15	(1)
2020	→ Siena (loan)	1	(0)
2020–2021	Acireale	12	(1)
2021	Gelbison	22	(6)
2021	Arezzo	10	(3)
2021–2022	Gelbison	40	(9)
2022	Casale	13	(0)
2022–2023	Nola	20	(10)
2023–2024	Roma City	31	(7)
2024–	Pistoiese	24	(12)
- * Club domestic league appearances and goals as of 2 March 2025

Claudio Sparacello (born 19 April 1995) is an Italian football player who plays for Serie D club Pistoiese.

== Club career ==
He made his Serie B debut for Trapani on 14 September 2015 in a game against Latina.

On 7 August 2018, he signed a two-year contract with Virtus Francavilla.

On 14 January 2019, he signed a 1.5-year contract with Teramo.

On 5 August 2019 he moved to Picerno. On 31 January 2020, he joined Siena on loan.

On 29 July 2021, he signed with Arezzo.

On 23 August 2022, Sparacello joined Casale in Serie D.

On 7 December 2022, Sparacello joined Nola in Serie D.
