= Renato Ricci (Italian footballer) =

Italian footballer (born 1991)

Personal information
- Date of birth: 7 January 1991 (age 35)
- Place of birth: Merate, Italy
- Height: 1.74 m (5 ft 9 in)
- Positions: Fullback; winger

Youth career
- 2004–2009: Internazionale
- 2008–2009: → Vicenza (loan)

Senior career*
Years	Team	Apps	(Gls)
2009–2013	Avellino	39	(2)
2009–2010	→ Campobasso (loan)	16	(5)
2013	→ Aversa Normanna (loan)	15	(2)
2013–2014	Arzanese	7	(2)
2014–2015	Torrecuso	9	(0)
2017–2018	Mantova	9	(0)
- * Club domestic league appearances and goals as of 30 June 2018

Renato Ricci (born 7 January 1991) is an Italian footballer who plays as a full-back or winger.

== Career ==
Born in Merate, Lombardy, Ricci started his career at Lombard club Internazionale as midfielder, winning the youth league champion with Giovanissimi Nazionali team in 2006 and with Allievi Nazionali team in 2008. He played once against Chiasso in a friendly which mixed with youth players and Inter first team players who without international duty.

In 2008–09 season he left for Vicenza along with Ivan Reali, which they all played for its Primavera Team. He was released in 2009. He then joined Serie D side Avellino and in November loaned to Serie D side Campobasso along with Dario Mariti.

After Avellino promoted back to professional league, he returned to the team as fullback.

In January 2013 he left for Aversa Normanna in temporary deal. He played for the team as wing forward but also played as a winger or fullback in the rest of the match.

On 2 August 2013 Ricci and Pasquale Porcaro agreed to terminate the contract with Avellino in a mutual consent.

He then joined Arzanese and then Torrecuso. In 2017, he joined newly re-founded Mantova.
