= ASG Nocerina =

Italian football club

Nocerina
- Full name: A.S.G. Noceorina
- Nicknames: Mastini (Mastiffs) rossonero (Red-Black)
- Founded: 1988 (as U.S. Nocerina); 2008 (re-founded as A.S.G. Nocerina)
- Dissolved: 2015
- Ground: Stadio San Francesco d'Assisi
- Capacity: 7,632
- Manager: Roberto Chiancone
- Website: www.asgnocerina.it
Home colours	Away colours	Third colours

A.S.G. Nocerina S.r.l., was an Italian association football club, based in Nocera Inferiore, Campania. The club withdrew from the league in 2015 and was replaced by A.S.D. Città di Nocera 1910 (formerly "Città di Agropoli"), which known as A.S.D. Nocerina 1910 since July 2016.

A.S.G. Nocerina S.r.l. was a new legal person to replace A.G. Nocerina 1910 S.r.l., while the latter, formerly known as U.S. Nocerina S.r.l. and Polisportiva Nocera Superiore, was a phoenix club of "A.C. Nocerina S.p.A." (formerly "A.G. Nocerina"). A.C. Nocerina bankrupted in 1988.

== History ==
=== A.G. Nocerina and A.C. Nocerina ===
The club was founded in 1910 as "Associazione Giovanile Nocera" [sic]. The club was incorporated as "Associazione Calcio Nocerina S.p.A." in 1978. In the same year the club promoted to Serie B.

=== U.S. Nocerina, A.G. Nocerina 1910 and A.S.G. Nocerina ===
In 1988, A.C. Nocerina was excluded from professional league. At the same time, another football club from Nocera Superiore: Polisportiva Nocera Superiore, was relocated to Nocera Inferiore as a phoenix club, namely Unione Sportiva Nocerina, The club was incorporated as a società a responsabilità limitata in 1994.

The club was then known as Associazione Giovanile Nocerina 1910 S.r.l. in 2000. In 2008, a new legal person of the same club was incorporated, namely A.S.G. Nocerina S.r.l. Dilettanti. The club was admitted to 2009–10 Lega Pro Seconda Divisione season on 30 July 2009, thus dropping amateur (Italian: dilettanti) from the legal suffix of the club.

Another A.S.G. Nocerina, A.S. Gioventù Nocerina, was the former name of the futsal (5-a-side-football) team A.S. Pagani Futsal, which was used until 2003. The two A.S.G. Nocerina had no relation to each other.

==== Serie B ====
In 2011, A.S.G. Nocerina won Serie B promotion from Lega Pro Prima Divisione. So returning to it after 32 years for the third time (if counting the club as the legitimate successor of A.C. Nocerina), following the two seasons played in 1948 and in 1979. Nocerina was relegated at the end of the season after finishing 20th in the Serie B table and returned to the Lega Pro Prima Divisione.

==== Sporting fraud controversy and withdrawal from league ====
On 10 November 2013, Nocerina played a match at local rivals Salernitana, a derby widely publicized in the Italian media as the "derby of shame". Immediately prior to the match, a number of Nocerina players allegedly received death threats from a group of thirty Nocerina supporters known as "Ultras", after those supporters were barred from the match by local authorities. The Nocerina players were reticent to take the pitch after hearing of the death threats, and kickoff was delayed 40 minutes until the players were finally convinced to begin the match.

Within the first two minutes of the match, Nocerina utilized all three of their allowed substitutions, due to injury. Five additional Nocerina players subsequently went off injured, leaving Nocerina with only six men on the pitch. The match was finally abandoned after 21 minutes. The reason for the high number of injuries was because the players didn't "warm up". As the players left the pitch, fans threw objects such as bottles, lighters, and food at the players in response for causing the game to be called off early.

A subsequent investigation by the Italian Football Federation (FIGC) into the events surrounding the match was conducted. The investigation resulted in Nocerina being found guilty of sporting fraud, as the injuries allegedly suffered by the eight Nocerina players were actually faked, due to the players' unwillingness to participate in the Salernitana match.

As a result of the findings of the investigation, FIGC announced on 29 January 2014 that Nocerina was to be fined €10,000 and demoted from the Lega Pro Prima Divisione. Nocerina would be reassigned to a lower division, to be determined by FIGC. Several players was also banned from football temporarily, despite some ban were shortened after appeal.

On 1 August 2014 Nocerina was assigned to Eccellenza Campania. In July 2015 the first team of the club withdrew from Eccellenza Campania, as well as not seeking to join any league such as Terza Categoria.

== Phoenix club ==
In 2015, another club from another comune was relocated to Nocera Inferiore and renamed to A.S.D. Città di Nocera 1910.

== Colors and badge ==
The team's colours are red and black. The club's nickname is the mastiffs.

== Honours ==
=== National titles ===
- Supercoppa di Lega Pro Prima Divisione
  - Winners: 2011
- Coppa Italia Serie C/Lega Pro
  - Finalist: 1996-97 and 2010-11
- Serie C South Italy Championship
  - Winners: 1946-47
- Scudetto Dilettanti
  - Winners: 1961-62

=== Interregional titles ===
- Serie C/Serie C1/Lega Pro 1 Divisione
  - Winners: 1946-47, 1977-78 and 2010-11
- Serie C2/Lega Pro 2 Divisione
  - Winners: 1985-86 and 1994-95
- Serie D
  - Winners: 1972-73

=== Regional titles ===
- Eccellenza Campania (Tier-I)
  - Eccellenza: 1992-93 and 2015–16)
  - Promozione: 1988-89 (Group C)
  - Prima Categoria: 1961-62 (Group D)
- Coppa Italia Dilettanti Campania
  - Winners: 2015–16
- Promozione Campania (Tier-II)
  - Winners: 2011–12 (as Città di Agropoli)

== The last 10 seasons ==
Season	Pos.	League	Notes
2005–06	13th	Serie C2 (Group C)	
2006–07	16th	Serie C2 (Group C)	relegated after playout
2007–08	3rd	Serie D (Group I)	
2008–09	2nd	Serie D (Group H)	admission to Lega Pro Seconda Divisione to fill vacancies
2009–10	13th	Lega Pro Seconda Divisione (Group B)	repêchage to Lega Pro Prima Divisione to fill vacancies
2010–11	1st	Lega Pro Prima Divisione (Group B)	promoted to Serie B
2011–12	20th	Serie B	relegated to Lega Pro Prima Divisione
2012–13	4th	Lega Pro Prima Divisione (Group B)	lost promotion playoff semi-final to Latina
2013–14	17th	Lega Pro Prima Divisione (Group B)	excluded from competition; forcibly relegated to Eccellenza Campania Group B.
2014–15	equal 7th	Eccellenza Campania (Group B)	withdrew from league at the end of season
