= ASD Puteolana 1902 =

Italian association football club

Puteolana
- Full name: Associazione Sportiva Dilettantistica; Puteolana 1902
- Nicknames: Diavoli rossi Flegrei
- Founded: 1902
- Ground: Stadio Domenico Conte, Pozzuoli, Campania
- Capacity: 7,000
- Chairman: Ciro Capuano
- Head coach: Carmine Correale
- League: Eccellenza Campania
- Website: puteolana1902.com
Home colours

Associazione Sportiva Dilettantistica Puteolana 1902 is an Italian association football club based in Pozzuoli, Campania, currently playing in Eccellenza.

Originally founded in 1902 as Puteoli Sport, they changed their name to U.S. Puteolana in 1919 and played at professional level under different denominations in the subsequent years.

The historic Puteolana played in the First Division Championship (Serie A) during the early 1920s. The last time they played in a professional league was Serie C2 in 2003.

The team's nickname is Diavoli rossi (Red Devils).

== History of Puteolana 1902 ==
=== Puteoli Sport ===
The club was founded in 1902 as an eclectic institution oriented to multiple sports under the banner of Puteoli Sport; this is the foundation date the club officially carries with it today. A few years later, in 1909, the name was changed to Puteoli Sporting Club.

For the 1913–14 season, they were entered into an FIGC-organized league in the form of the Terza Categoria, which at the time was the third level of Italian football (today's equivalent is Serie C1).

=== U.S. Puteolana ===
==== Italian Football Championship ====
After World War I, the club was renamed for the third time to Unione Sportiva Puteolana. They were entered into the Prima Categoria Championship (Serie A) for the 1919–20 season; here they competed against the top clubs in the Campania region and qualified for the semi-finals of Southern Italy, eventually losing out to Fortitudo Roma.

The following season they were entered into the championship again, beating sides such as Naples and Salernitana. Despite qualifying for the next round, FIGC put them in last place due to irregularities, which ended their season early.

As Italian football split into two factions after the main teams disagreed with FIGC, Puteolana played in the CCI run league (called Prima Divisione) which featured most of the big clubs. In the Campania section, they competed against six other teams and won all 12 fixtures. They then defeated Anconitana before facing Fortitudo in Rome for a chance to meet Pro Vercelli in the league's final for the championship. However, Putelolana lost 2–0 to Fortitudo, essentially meaning they ended the season with a top-four finish.

Despite their respectable position in the previous season, the club were not enrolled into the newly reunited league (because of economic problems), instead competing in the far lower III Divisione. The club climbed up two divisions and by 1925–26 were back in the top level championship, however they lasted just one season as they lost all of their games in the Campania section.

==== Decline ====
The club disappeared from upper-level competition for a large period of time, from 1926 until 1947. During this period, they competed in competitions such as the provincial ULIC youth leagues, and various seasons were spent in purely amateur divisions such as I Divisione, II Divisione, and III Divisione.

Eventually, Puteolana won I Divisione in 1947–48 and were promoted up to the Promozione Interregionale, which was just one step below Serie C at the time. They would bounce between Serie D and Promozione Campania for much of the 1950s and 1960s. After being promoted from Promozione Campania in 1969–70, they spent the entire decade of the 1970s in Serie D, generally around the mid-table area; the closest they came to gaining promotion was a 4th-place finish in 1973–74.

The start of the 1980s brought the club into turmoil; they were relegated in three successive seasons before becoming defunct in 1982. However, that season a team from the city of Naples called Internapoli moved to Pozzuoli because they were having problems with their home Stadio Arturo Collana and thus changed their name to S.C. Puteolana 1909. After just four seasons in Serie D and one in Promozione, the new club too was folded in 1986.

=== Campania Puteolana ===
A club founded in 1975 in the Province of Caserta but having moved to Ponticelli in Naples, it moved again in 1986 to Pozzuoli to carry on the older clubs' legacy in the city. A man named Mario Giocondo Mauriello engineered the move, and the club changed its name from Campania Ponticelli to Società Sportiva Calcio Campania Puteolana.

Campania Puteolana was playing in Serie C1, gaining a 6th-place finish in their first season since the rebirth. The same season in the Coppa Italia Serie C, they finished as runners-up to Livorno after losing the two-legged final 3–1. Under the management of Claudio Ranieri (his first managerial job) the club were relegated to Serie C2 the following year, however Brazilian manager Jarbas Faustinho Canè led them straight back up as champions.

After two more seasons in the lower half of Serie C1, they were relegated and then relegated from Serie C2 by 1992. Instead of continuing in the city, the Campania club moved back to Naples and would eventually fall into obscurity.

=== From Comprensorio Puteolano to F.C. Puteolana 1902 ===
Former Puteolana badge

To carry on the legacy of the city's historic club, Fiore, Corvo, Morelli, and Cesarano refounded it as Comprensorio Puteolano' in 1992. The club started the 1992–93 season in the Promozione Campania. After one season, the club was promoted up to Eccellenza and straight back into Serie D.

During this period, Puteolana spent several seasons in Serie D, generally finishing in respectable positions (notching up a 3rd and 4th-place finish). Eventually in 1999–00 promotion into Serie C2 came, the club were now back at professional level, they came very close to recording a successive promotion with a 4th-place finish. However, by 2002–03, the club were once again relegated to Serie D and two years later back down to Eccellenza Campania. Between 2005 and 2008, the legal entity of the club was Football Club Puteolana 1902; they remained in the Eccellenza league for three seasons before being relegated to Promozione.

=== 2008-09: A.S.D. Atletico Puteolana 2008 ===
The club was born by Football Club Puteolana and Gragnano (a Serie D club) union, becoming in Serie D for the 2008–09 season.

==== 2012: Puteolana 1902 ====
In 2012, at "Domenico Conte" stadium returns to play in a major championship (this time it is D series), thanks to the transfer dell'Internapoli Football Club in Pozzuoli, which gives life to the SSD Puteolana 1902 Internapoli. In 2014, the club reacquired the historical denomination, becoming S.S.D. Puteolana 1902.

In 2024, the club acquired the sports title of Real Casalnuovo, this way ensuring themselves a spot in the Serie D league.

== Colors and badge ==
The team's colours were maroon, known locally as granata.

== Honours ==
- III Divisione
  - Winners: 1924–25
- Serie C2
  - Winners: 1988–89
- Coppa Italia Serie C
  - Runners-up: 1986–1987
- Serie D
  - Winners: 1999–00
- Eccellenza Campania
  - Winners: 1969–70
  - Promoted: 1993–94
- Promozione Campania
  - Winners: 1962–63
  - Promoted: 1951–52, 1992–93
- Prima Divisione Campania
  - Winners: 1947–48
