= ASD Tiger Brolo =

Italian football club

- Full name: Associazione Sportiva Dilettantistica Tiger Brolo
- Nickname: Tigri (The Tigers)
- Founded: 2003; 23 years ago
- Dissolved: 2015; 11 years ago
- Ground: Stadio Comunale
- Capacity: 2,500
- 2014–15: Serie D, Group I, 16th of 18 (relegated)
- Website: httpS://www.asdtigerbrolo.it/
Home colours

Associazione Sportiva Tiger Brolo, commonly known as Tiger Brolo (pronounced [ˈtaiɡer ˈbrɔːlo]), was an Italian football club based in Brolo, Sicily, who last competed in Serie D, the fourth tier of the Italian football league system, before being dissolved in 2015.

== History ==
The club was founded in 2003 by Antonio Cipriano, who aimed to recreate the spirit of the old GS Tiger. In the season 2013–14 the team was promoted for the first time from Eccellenza Sicily to Serie D. After just one season, they were relegated back to Eccellenza; however, in July 2015, the club failed to register to the new season due to financial issues and therefore folded altogether. In 2023, after a seven-year legal battle, Carmelo Arasi, Giovanni Scaffidi Mangialardo, and Antonio Mai were accused of embezzling €122,100 by using their leadership roles at the club to conceal the unlawful income.
