= ASDC Pomigliano =

Italian football club

Pomigliano
- Full name: Associazione Sportiva Dilettantistica Calcio Pomigliano
- Founded: 1920; 1995 (refounded)
- Ground: Stadio Ugo Gobbato, Pomigliano d'Arco, Italy
- Capacity: 1,600
- Chairman: Angelo Guastafierro
- Manager: Luigi Sanchez
- League: Eccellenza Campania
- 2018–19: Serie D/H, 17th (relegated)
| Home colours | Away colours |

Associazione Sportiva Dilettantistica Calcio Pomigliano is an Italian association football club located in Pomigliano d'Arco, Campania. It currently plays in Eccellenza Campania.

== History ==
=== Gruppo Sportivo Pomigliano ===
The club was founded in 1920 as Gruppo Sportivo Pomigliano.

After several years in the regional championships, in 1947 came the club's first historic promotion to Serie C (under the name of Juve Alfa Pomigliano, enactment of working men's club soccer establishments in Alfa Romeo city), finished in ninth place but the structural reform of the championships sent them in the Promozione. Returned in Serie C the following year, but they were relegated immediately.

After several years between the regional top flight and Serie D, due to various economic hardships that have arisen from the late eighties, the company finally disappeared in 1992.

=== From Followers Pomigliano to A.S.D.C. Pomigliano ===
The club was refounded in 1995 as Followers Pomigliano. Restarting from Terza Categoria, Pomigliano Calcio returned to Serie D in 2002, 15 years after the last inter-regional tournament played.

In the summer 2005 the club was renamed with the current name.

In the 2010–11 and 2011–12 seasons the club gained access to the promotion play-off for Lega Pro Seconda Divisione, but was eventually eliminated both times.

In the 2012–13 season, it plays still in Serie D for the eleventh consecutive championship.

== Colors and badge ==
The official color of the club is garnet.

== Honors ==
=== National Titles ===
Coppa Italia Serie D

- Winners: 2013–14 2-2 (5–4) against Pontisola

South Italian Championship

- Winners: 1948-49

=== Regional Titles ===
Coppa Italia Dilettanti Campania

- Winners: 2025-26
