= Stadio Gino Manni =

Stadium in Colle di Val d'Elsa, Italy

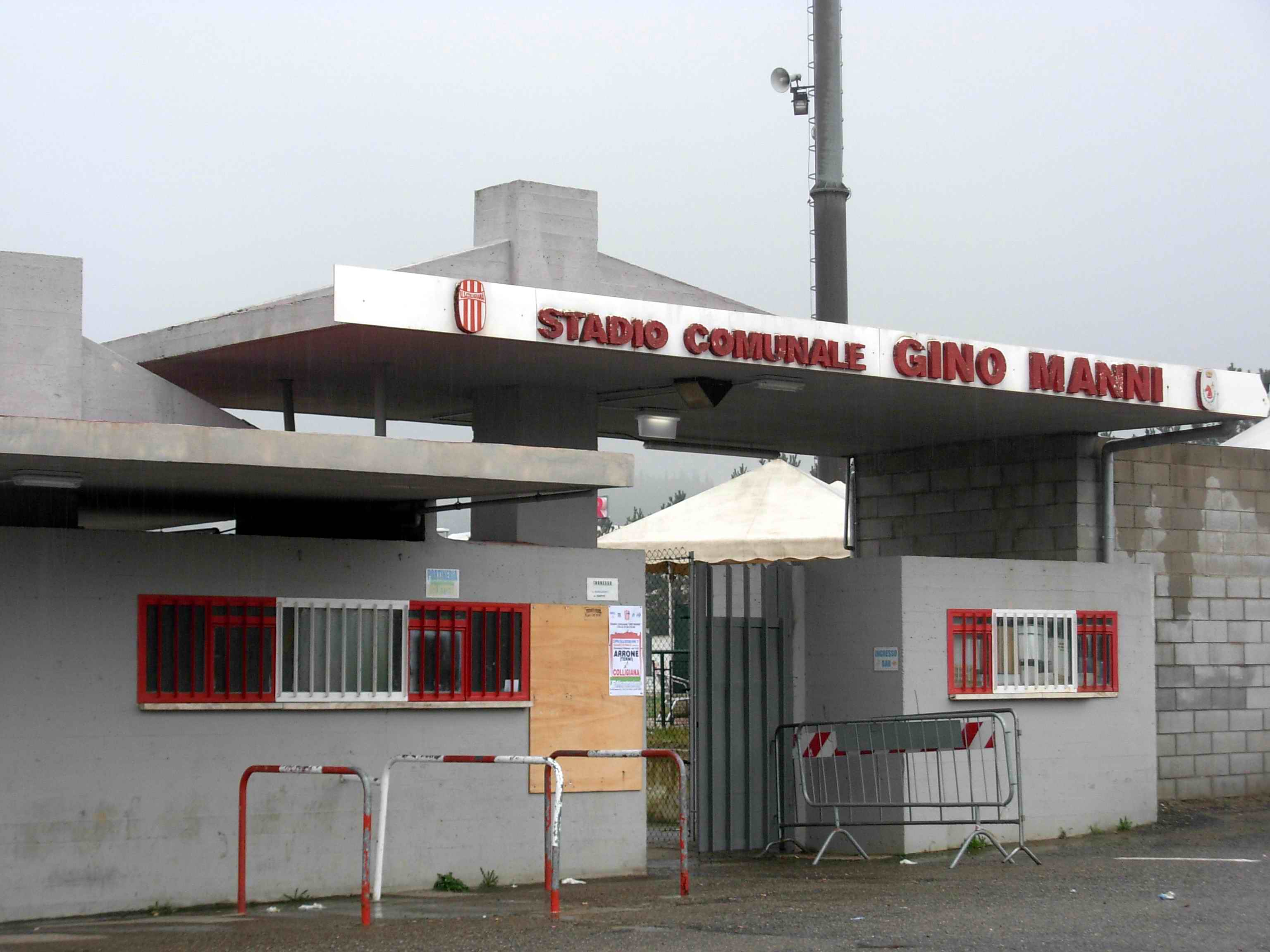
- Ingresso stadio comunale Gino Manni
- Interactive map of Stadio Gino Manni
- Full name: Stadio Comunale "Gino Manni"
- Location: Via Liguria N° 3, 53034, Colle di Val d'Elsa (SI)
- Coordinates: 43°24′N 11°8′E
- Owner: Municipality of Colle di Val d'Elsa
- Operator: V.F. Colligiana
- Capacity: 3,000
- Surface: Grass
- Field size: 110 m × 65 m (361 ft × 213 ft)

Construction
- Built: Unknown
- Opened: 1982
- Renovated: 2009

Tenant
- V.F. Colligiana

Stadio Gino Manni formerly Stadio Comunale Gino Manni is the main stadium of municipality of Colle di Val d'Elsa.

It was inaugurated in 1982 and is the playground of Colligiana, the football team of Colle Val d'Elsa, in 2008-09 and 2009–10 seasons he played in the Pro League Second Division championship was named Gino Manni, Colligiana football glory, boasting in Serie A in the thirties and forties and, repeatedly coached the local football team, bringing in the 1957/58 season to the European record of consecutive victories.

It has a capacity of over 3,000 spectators. It features a covered grandstand and an outdoor staircase. Under the grandstand houses are the offices of the headquarters of Colligiana, restrooms and storage. It features track and platforms for the conduct of all disciplines of athletics. The measures of the grass are the standard form of 105 m to 65 m.

The sports complex includes a field that is part grass subsidiary of regulatory measures with discovery platform, two subsidiaries in volcanic fields, three soccer fields in synthetic, a pool and a gym. All systems are equipped with lighting. Inside the stadium there is a bar and a restaurant.

It is part of the Abbey of the sports complex, which includes the Sports Arena, the indoor skating rink, the golf course, the installation of the shooting, tennis courts. Since the football team of Siena in Serie A, has become the training ground of the team Juventus.

It hosted several matches of the World Cup tournament in Viareggio and has been home to a withdrawal of Turin in 1992. There was held the final of the Italian Super Cup women's soccer in 1999. Every year is the seat of the Epiphany football tournament involving many youth football teams.
