= ASD Nocerina 1910 =

Italian football club

ASD Nocerina Calcio 1910
- Full name: Associazione Sportiva Dilettantistica Nocerina 1910
- Nicknames: I Molossi (The Mastiffs); I Rossoneri (The Red & Blacks)
- Short name: Nocerina
- Founded: 1910; 1988 as US Nocerina; 2015 (refounded)
- Ground: Stadio San Francesco d'Assisi
- Capacity: 10,080
- Owner(s): Corrado Del Giudice, Salvatore Napolitano
- Chairman: Raffaele Stella
- Head coach: Salvatore Campilongo
- League: Serie D Group G
- 2024–25: Serie D Group I, 2nd
- Website: www.nocerina.it
colours

A.S.D. Nocerina 1910, known as Nocerina and formerly known as Città di Nocera, is an Italian football club based in Nocera Inferiore, Campania. The club was founded in 2015 by using the sports title of Città di Agropoli, after the major club of the city, A.S.G. Nocerina withdrew from the football leagues. The club was purchased in 2022 by three American businessmen Giancarlo Natale, Raffaele Scalzi, and Louie A. Goros. This marks the first Americans in history to purchase an Italian soccer club in Southern Italy. The club currently plays in Serie D.

== History ==
=== A.G. Nocerina and A.C. Nocerina ===
The club was founded in 1910 as "Associazione Giovanile Nocera" [sic]. The club was incorporated as "Associazione Calcio Nocerina S.p.A." in 1978. In the same year the club promoted to Serie B.

=== U.S. Nocerina, A.G. Nocerina 1910 and A.S.G. Nocerina ===
In 1988, A.C. Nocerina was excluded from professional league. At the same time, another football club from Nocera Superiore: Polisportiva Nocera Superiore, was relocated to Nocera Inferiore as a phoenix club, namely Unione Sportiva Nocerina, The club was incorporated as a società a responsabilità limitata in 1994.

The club was then known as Associazione Giovanile Nocerina 1910 S.r.l. in 2000. In 2008, a new legal person of the same club was incorporated, namely A.S.G. Nocerina S.r.l. Dilettanti. The club was admitted to 2009–10 Lega Pro Seconda Divisione season on 30 July 2009, thus dropping amateur (Italian: dilettanti) from the legal suffix of the club.

Another A.S.G. Nocerina, A.S. Gioventù Nocerina, was the former name of the futsal (5-a-side-football) team A.S. Pagani Futsal, which was used until 2003. The two A.S.G. Nocerina had no relation to each other.

==== Serie B ====
In 2011, A.S.G. Nocerina won Serie B promotion from Lega Pro Prima Divisione. So returning to it after 32 years for the third time (if counting the club as the legitimate successor of A.C. Nocerina), following the two seasons played in 1948 and in 1979. Nocerina was relegated at the end of the season after finishing 20th in the Serie B table and returned to the Lega Pro Prima Divisione.

==== Sporting fraud controversy and withdrawal from league ====
On 10 November 2013, Nocerina played a match at local rivals Salernitana, a derby widely publicized in the Italian media as the "derby of shame". Immediately prior to the match, a number of Nocerina players allegedly received death threats from a group of thirty Nocerina supporters known as "Ultras", after those supporters were barred from the match by local authorities. The Nocerina players were reticent to take the pitch after hearing of the death threats, and kickoff was delayed 40 minutes until the players were finally convinced to begin the match.

Within the first two minutes of the match, Nocerina utilized all three of their allowed substitutions, due to injury. Five additional Nocerina players subsequently went off injured, leaving Nocerina with only six men on the pitch. The match was finally abandoned after 21 minutes. The reason for the high number of injuries was because the players didn't "warm up". As the players left the pitch, fans threw objects such as bottles, lighters, and food at the players in response for causing the game to be called off early.

A subsequent investigation by the Italian Football Federation (FIGC) into the events surrounding the match was conducted. The investigation resulted in Nocerina being found guilty of sporting fraud, as the injuries allegedly suffered by the eight Nocerina players were actually faked, due to the players' unwillingness to participate in the Salernitana match.

As a result of the findings of the investigation, FIGC announced on 29 January 2014 that Nocerina was to be fined €10,000 and demoted from the Lega Pro Prima Divisione. Nocerina would be reassigned to a lower division, to be determined by FIGC. Several players was also banned from football temporarily, despite some ban were shortened after appeal.

On 1 August 2014 Nocerina was assigned to Eccellenza Campania. In July 2015 the first team of the club withdrew from Eccellenza Campania, as well as not seeking to join any league such as Terza Categoria.

=== Città di Agropoli ===
A.S.D. Città di Agropoli was a football club that attributed to the comune Agropoli but based in Campagna, in the province of Salerno. The club also played in Angri and Battipaglia in the past. The club was named "Città di Agropoli" but had no relation with U.S. Agropoli 1921, the winner of 2011–12 Eccellenza Campania Group B. Città di Agropoli won Promozione Campania Group D in the same season.

Città di Agropoli played 3 seasons in Eccellenza Campania from 2012 to 2015. In the last season, Città di Agropoli finished as the 12th of Group B, while A.S.G. Nocerina finished as the equal 7th in the same group.

=== A.S.D. Nocerina 1910 ===
After A.S.G. Nocerina withdrew from the league in 2015, Città di Agropoli, based in Campagna, was merged with A.S.D. Matteo Solferino, a five-a-side football club from Nocera Inferiore. The new club, Associazione Sportiva Dilettantistica Città di Nocera 1910 (A.S.D. Città di Nocera 1910) also headquartered in Nocera Inferiore but inherited the "sports title" of Città di Agropoli in 2015–16 Eccellenza Campania season. The two comuni were from the same province, thus such relocation was allowed in the regulation.

In the first season, Città di Nocera won Eccellenza Campania Group B and the promotion to 2016–17 Serie D season. The club was renamed to "A.S.D. Nocerina 1910" in July 2016.

The club was penalized 3 points in 2018, due one of the predecessors, A.S.D. Matteo Solferino, fielded an ineligible player during 2014–15 season.

== Honours ==
=== National titles ===
- Supercoppa di Lega Pro Prima Divisione
  - Winners: 2011
- Scudetto Dilettanti
  - Winners: 1961-62

=== Interregional titles ===
- Serie C South Italy Championship
  - Winners: 1946-47
- Serie C/Serie C1/Lega Pro 1 Divisione
  - Winners: 1946-47, 1977–78 and 2010–11
- Serie C2/Lega Pro 2 Divisione
  - Winners: 1985-86 and 1994–95
- Serie D
  - Winners: 1972-73

=== Regional titles ===
- Eccellenza Campania (Tier-I)
  - Eccellenza: 1992-93 and 2015–16)
  - Promozione: 1988-89 (Group C)
  - Prima Categoria: 1961-62 (Group D)
- Coppa Italia Dilettanti Campania
  - Winners: 2015–16
- Promozione Campania (Tier-II)
  - Winners: 2011–12 (as Città di Agropoli)
