= GSD Castelfidardo Calcio =

Italian association football club

Castelfidardo
- Full name: Gruppo Sportivo Dilettantistico Castelfidardo
- Founded: 1944
- Ground: Stadio Stadio G. Mancini; Castelfidardo, Italy
- Capacity: 3,000
- Chairman: Gianfranco D'Angelo
- Manager: Marco Mancinelli
- League: Eccellenza Marche
- 2025–26: Serie D/F, 17th (relegated)
Home colours	Away colours

Gruppo Sportivo Dilettantistico Castelfidardo, commonly referred to as Castelfidardo, is an Italian football club based in Castelfidardo, Marche. It currently plays in Eccellenza Marche.

== History ==
=== Foundation ===
The club was founded in 1944.

=== Serie D ===
In the season 2013–14 the team was promoted, from Eccellenza Marche to Serie D after winning the national play-off.

== Colors and badge ==
The team's colors are white and green.
