= Abano Calcio =

Italian football club

Abano
- Full name: Abano Calcio
- Founded: 1950
- Ground: Campo Sportivo, Saccolongo, Italy
- League: Seconda Categoria
Home colours	Away colours

Abano Calcio is an Italian football club based in Abano Terme, Veneto. Currently it plays in Italy's Seconda Categoria.

== History ==
=== Foundation ===
The club was founded in 1950.

=== Serie D ===
The team has played in Serie D from 1977 to 1984 and was promoted again in the season 2013–14.

== Colors and badge ==
The team's colors are black and green.
