= ASD US Scafatese Calcio =

Italian football club

U.S. Scafatese
- Full name: Associazione Sportiva Dilettantistica; Unione Sportiva Scafatese Calcio
- Founded: 2010
- Dissolved: 2016
- Ground: Stadio comunale 28 settembre 1943, Scafati, Italy
- Capacity: 1,950
Home colours	Away colours

Associazione Sportiva Dilettantistica Unione Sportiva Scafatese Calcio was a clone Italian association football club located in Scafati, Campania.

== History ==
=== Foundation ===
The club was founded in 2010 as A.S.D. Virtus Scafatese 2010 and in 2014 it was renamed with the new name.

=== Serie D ===
In the season 2013–14 the team played with the fellow-citizen of S.S. Scafatese Calcio 1922 and was promoted for the first time, from Eccellenza Campania/B to Serie D, but it was immediately relegated. It folded in 2016.

== Colors and badge ==
Its colors are blue and yellow.
