= ASD Torrecuso Calcio =

Italian football club

Torrecuso
- Full name: Associazione Sportiva Dilettantistica Torrecuso Calcio
- Founded: 1962
- Ground: Stadio G. Ocone, Torrecuso, Campania
- Capacity: 1,500
- Chairman: (Italy) Tedesco Michelino
- Manager: (Italy) Franco Dellisanti
- League: Serie D/I
- 2013–14: Serie D/I, 5th
Home colours	Away colours

A.S.D. Torrecuso Calcio was an Italian football club based in Torrecuso, Campania.It played in Italy's Serie D.

== History ==
=== Foundation ===
The club was founded in 1962.

=== Serie D ===
In the season 2012–13 the team was promoted for the first time, from Eccellenza Campania/B to Serie D.

== Colors and badge ==
The team's colors were red and blue.
