= ASD Villabiagio =

Italian football club

Villabiagio
- Full name: Associazione Sportiva Dilettantistica Villabiagio
- Founded: 2001
- Dissolved: 2018
- Ground: Stadio Comunale Vestrelli, Castiglione della Valle, Italy
- 2017-18: Serie D/D, 7th
| Home colours | Away colours |

Associazione Sportiva Dilettantistica Villabiagio was an Italian association football club, based in Villanova, Marsciano and San Biagio della Valle, Umbria.

At the beginning of the 2018–19 season Villabiagio renounces participation in the Serie D and ceases his sporting activity.

== History ==
=== Foundation ===
The club was founded in 2001.

=== Serie D ===
In the season 2013–14 the team was promoted for the first time, from Eccellenza Umbria to Serie D, but the first season in the fourth series ends with the 16th place and relegation to Eccellenza. In 2017 Villabiagio returns to Serie D but, after 7th place in the 2017–2018 season, the club doesn't re-register and ceases its activity.
