= Stadio Enzo Blasone =

Football stadium in Foligno, Italy

Coordinates: 42°57′12″N 12°41′30″E

Stadio comunale Enzo Blasone
- Interactive map of Stadio comunale Enzo Blasone
- Location: Foligno, Italy
- Owner: Municipality of Foligno
- Capacity: 5,650
- Surface: Grass

Construction
- Groundbreaking: 1981
- Opened: 1983

Tenant
- Foligno Calcio

The Enzo Blasone Stadium (Stadio comunale Enzo Blasone) is a multi-use stadium in Foligno, Italy. It is currently used mostly for football matches and is the home stadium of Foligno Calcio. It holds 4.650.

It was built in 1981 - 1982 because of the promotion of Foligno Calcio to Serie C2, the former fourth level of Italian football.

The stadium was originally called "Santo Pietro", which is the name of the area of Foligno it is located in. It was renamed for Enzo Blasone, a former footballer and local coach, after his death.

The stadium underwent a variety of renovations in the 2010s and 2020s.
