= ASD Battipagliese =

Italian football club

Battipagliese
- Full name: Associazione Sportiva Battipagliese Calcio 1929
- Nicknames: Bianconeri; Zebrette
- Founded: 1929
- Ground: Stadio Luigi Pastena, Battipaglia, Italy
- Capacity: 7,000
- Owner: (Italy) Massimiliano Corrado
- Chairman: (Italy) Antonio Boffa
- Manager: (Italy) Pasquale Iuliano
- League: Eccellenza
- Website: https://battipagliese1929.it/
Home colours	Away colours

Associazione Sportiva Battipagliese Calcio 1929, also known as Battipagliese, is an Italian football club from Battipaglia, Campania. The club currently plays in Eccellenza.

== History ==
=== Foundation ===
The history of Battipagliese can be traced back to the founding of the comune Battipaglia. The football club was founded in 1929, the same year as the comune and so the two have grown together. It was founded by president Giuseppe Agnetti, director of sport Fioravante Di Cunzolo and former football player, and trainer Salvatore De Crescenzo.

For the 1933–34 season they were placed in the inter-regional league of Seconda Divisione, facing teams from Campobasso and Potenza.

=== Serie C1-C2 ===
During its history Battipagliese played many years in Serie C1 and Serie C2. The club had promotion into Serie C1 in the seasons of 1989–90 and 1996–97. During 1997, Battipagliese shocked U.S. Città di Palermo when the unexpectedly defeated them in a play off to stay in Serie C1.

=== Serie D ===
It was relegated from Serie D in the 2004–05 season after finishing 18th.

The team was again promoted to Serie D in the season 2009–10 and so actually plays in this league for the 3rd season in a row.
