= US Arzanese =

Italian football club

Arzanese
- Full name: Unione Sportiva Arzanese
- Founded: 1924
- Ground: Stadio Sabatino De Rosa, Arzano, Italy
- Capacity: 4,000
- Chairman: Umberto Serrao
- Manager: Vincenzo Nutolo
- League: Serie D
- 2013–14: Lega Pro Seconda Divisione/B, 12th
Home colours	Away colours

Unione Sportiva Arzanese is an Italian association football club located in Arzano, Campania. It currently plays in Serie D.

== History ==
=== Early years ===
The team was founded in 1924 as Unione Sportiva Arzanese in the town of Arzano.
At the end of the twenties participate in 1ª Categoria del Comitato U.L.I.C. di Napoli Nord.
The first real championship team raced was after the end of World War II.
The President in 1945 was Russo.

In a memorable 1947–48 Prima Divisione championship with the resounding victory against Isernia (10–1) with four goals from Barbato. Of that training was also part of the late Sabatino De Rosa to which the council decided to dedicate the name to the stadium on the outskirts of the city of Naples.

The Arzanese has participated in eight Serie D championships, won the championship of Prima categoria in 1973–74, Promozione in 1979–80 and in 1986–87, Eccellenza in 1995–96 and finally that of Serie D 2010–2011.

The youth sector is full of talented players over the last decade. In 2010 Arzanese was declared "Regional Champion" by beating 2–1 Gladiator in the final. Second success after the historic victory in 2000 against Ariano Irpino.

=== Lega Pro Seconda Divisione ===
It was promoted in the 2010–11 season from Serie D to Lega Pro Seconda Divisione.

In its first year in Lega Pro Seconda Divisione Arzanese finished in ninth place, and the next season it finished in tenth.

== Colors and badge ==
The colours of the team are white and blue.
