= ASD Città di Foligno 1928 =

Italian football club

Foligno
- Full name: A.C. Foligno 1928 A.S.D.
- Nickname: Falchetti (Little hawks)
- Founded: 1928
- Ground: Stadio Enzo Blasone, Foligno, Italy
- Capacity: 5,658
- Chairman: Franco Fedeli
- Manager: Marco Di Loreto
- League: Serie D/F
- 2025–26: Serie D/E, 7th
Home colours	Away colours

A.C. Foligno 1928 A.S.D. is an Italian association football club, based in Foligno, Umbria. It currently plays in Serie D.

== History ==
The club was founded in 1928, but Foligno had football teams since the early '900. Then meetings were held with the Czechoslovak military stationed in Foligno during the First World War. The best result Foligno obtained in the Prima Divisione championship in 1933–34 was when it ended in second place in the standings and thereby gained access to the finals for the promotion among the runners-up: the outcome of this season was later overturned paradoxically by Federation that condemned the company for unlawful sport to relegation.

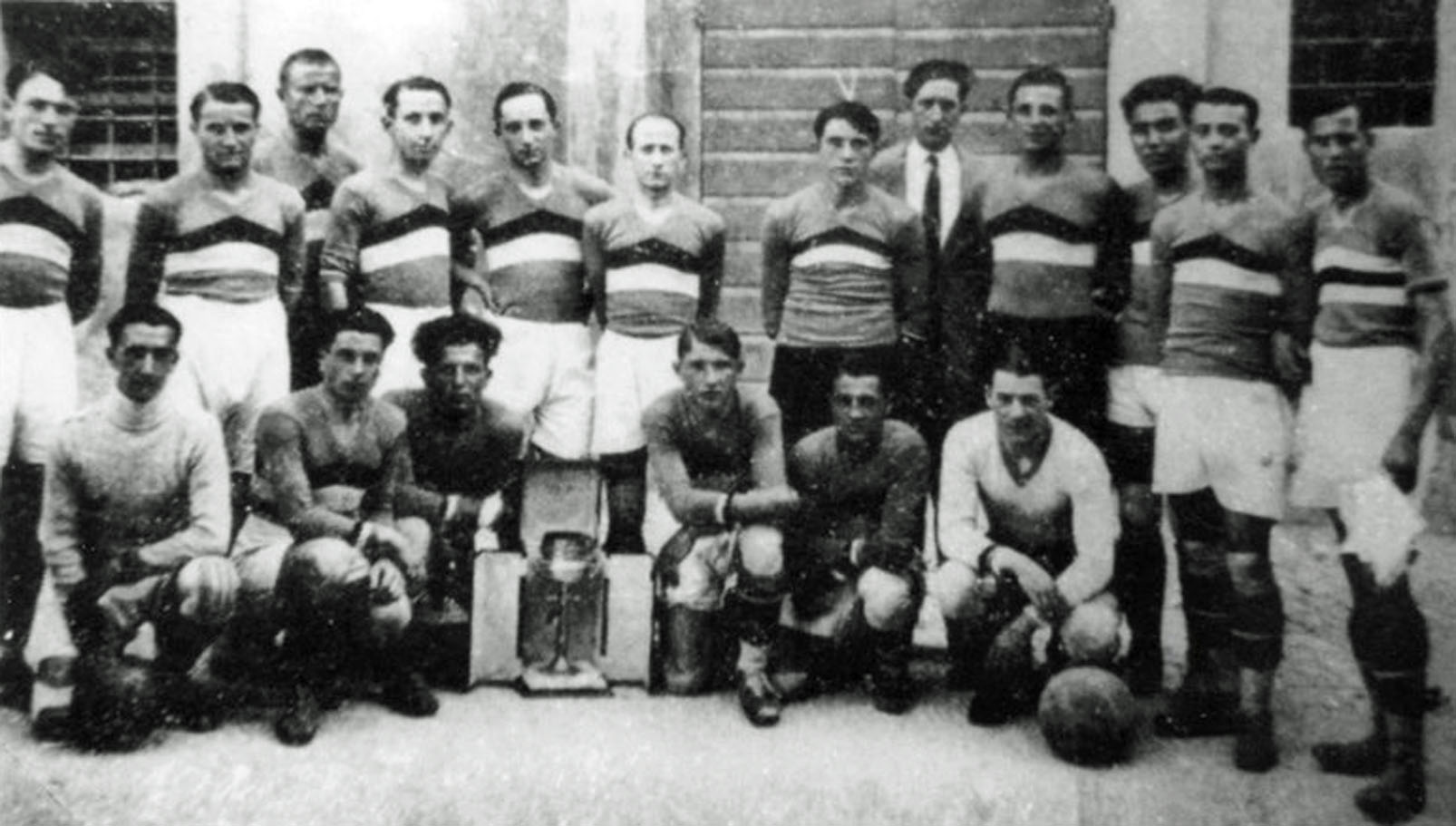
1928–29 Foligno

On 6 May 2007, with a day in advance of the end of the season 2006–2007, Foligno (led by Giovanni Pagliari) won the Serie C2 Group B and was promoted to Serie C1.

In the season 2007–2008, played in Serie C1 Group A. Pierpaolo Bisoli was chosen by the company as the technical coach. On 27 April 2008, by beating 0–2 at Penzo stadium Venezia, gained access to the play-off for promotion to Serie B. In the first game, played in Foligno, the home team beat 1–0 Cittadella. The second leg, played at Cittadella on 25 May 2008, Foligno was beaten 0–2, losing the promotion to Serie B.

In the season 2008/2009, Foligno participates in the Lega Pro Prima Divisione championship (formerly Serie C1) Group B. The conduction technique was entrusted to Roberto Cevoli, but with only two wins and a number of draws, was fired on 4 November and was replaced with Paolo Indiani; the initial impact of the new coach is bad, since the team suffers three consecutive defeats and was second from the bottom in half a season. From January, with a few new signings Foligno becomes stronger, and the team seems to catch up (gaining important victories: against league leader Gallipoli, in the derby against Ternana and Arezzo), although, because of a further decline in results, after the defeat against Virtus Lanciano, Marcello Pizzimenti became the new coach replacing Indiani. The Foligno still finished in the play-out zone and played against Pistoiese. It was beaten in Pistoia in the first leg 2–1, but obtained salvation after winning the second leg 1–0.

On 7 July 2009, Luca Fusi was officially the new coach for season 2009–2010. At the end of 2009 Fusi signed a contract extension until 30 June 2011, but on 26 April 2010 was sucked.

On 9 May 2010, the Foligno beat in "Renato Curi" Perugia with 2–0 and thus avoided the play-out. It was a very important victory and it was followed by a grand celebration in the streets of the city.

On 13 December 2010, coach Salvatore Matrecano was sacked, and Federico Giunti appointed as the new coach.

At the end of the championship, Foligno was found in the area play-out against Ternana. Foligno won the first leg at home 1–0. At the second leg of the play-out, played in Terni, the home team was preceding in the score with 1–0 in the second half, but in the extra time Foligno scored the winning goal, which result in a draw, ending the match 1–1, thus retaining its spot in the league.

On 29 April 2012, Foligno was defeated 1–0 from Carpi. The result confirmed the mathematical relegation to Lega Pro Seconda Divisione as Foligno finished last in the standings.

On 10 July 2015, the sports title was transferred from Foligno Calcio S.r.l. to A.S.D. Città di Foligno 1928 S.r.l.. Serie D

== Colors and badge ==
The team's colours are blue and white.
