= FC Aprilia Racing Club =

Italian football club

Racing Aprilia
- Full name: Football Club Aprilia Racing Club
- Founded: 2009; 2018 (merged with Racing Fondi)
- Ground: Stadio Quinto Ricci
- Capacity: 2,000
- Chairman: Antonio Pezone
- Manager: Giorgio Galluzzo
- League: Serie D Group G
- 2017–18: Serie D Group G, 6th of 18
- Website: http://www.fcapriliaracingclub.it
Home colours	Away colours

Football Club Aprilia Racing Club is an Italian football club based in Aprilia, Latina, Lazio. As of 2018–19 season, Aprilia was participating in Serie D. In 2018, F.C. Aprilia merged with S.S. Racing Club Fondi to form the current club.

== Predecessors ==
Associazione Calcio Aprilia was founded in 1971. The club folded in 2009 after last played in Eccellenza Lazio and selling its sports title to form S.S.D. Vigor Cisterna, despite at the same time, investor also bought another sports title to form the phoenix club of Aprilia.

== History ==
=== F.C. Rondinelle Latina ===
In 2009, investor acquired a sports title in Serie D to found F.C. Rondinelle Latina. The sports title was sold by F.C. Latina after the club was merged with U.S. Virtus Latina to form U.S. Latina Calcio. Despite Rondinelle Latina was named after Latina, the club played in Stadio Quinto Ricci, Aprilia.

On 26 May 2010 the club changed the name to F.C. Aprilia.

=== F.C. Aprilia ===
At the end of the 2010–11 season the club won group G of Serie D and was promoted to Lega Pro Seconda Divisione.

The debut in the Lega Pro Seconda Divisione for the 2011–2012 season was very satisfying finishing fifth and securing a place in the playoffs for promotion to Lega Pro Prima Divisione, losing in the semi-final to Chieti.

=== F.C. Aprilia Racing Club ===
The club changed its denomination to F.C. Aprilia Racing Club in 2018, after Antonio Pezone, former owner of Racing Roma and Racing Fondi, merging the latter with F.C. Aprilia.

== Crest ==
The club used the coat of arms of the city and comune as the main element of the club logo. However, it used the former version of the coat of arms, which the crown in the coat of arms was changed.
