= 2012–13 US Alessandria Calcio season =

U.S. Alessandria Calcio 1912
2012–13 season
- Chairman: (Italy) Maurizio Pavignano
- Head Coach: (Italy) Egidio Notaristefano
- Stadium: Stadio Giuseppe Moccagatta, Alessandria
- Lega Pro 2D: 8th (after 34th round)
- Coppa Italia LP: 1st round
- Top goalscorer: (Italy) Jacopo Fanucchi (9)
Home colours	Away colours

The 2012–13 season of U.S. Alessandria Calcio 1912's was their 92nd in Italian football and their 16th in Lega Pro Seconda Divisione (former Serie C2).

== Key dates ==
- 26 August: gaining only 1-point in the two games against Pavia and Savona, Alessandria is eliminated in the first qualification round of Coppa Italia Lega Pro.
- 2 September: Alessandria wins its championship debut match against Fano with a considerable 0–6 away.
- 12 May: with a 1–1 draw away to Bellaria Igea, Alessandria finished the season in 8th position.

== Club ==
Management

- Chairman: Maurizio Pavignano
- Consulors: Valerio Bonanno, Paolo Camagna, Gianluigi Capra and Gisella Villata
- General Secretary: Stefano Toti
- Amministrative Secretary: Federica Rosina
- Secretary: Stefano Carlet
- Communication: Gigi Poggio
- PR: Mario Risciglione
- Supporters Communication: Emanuele Bellingeri
- Referees Communication: Guido Nardone
- Marketing: Massimiliano Baroglio, Alberto Viarengo, Antonio Visca and Carlo Zoccola

Coaching staff

- Sporting Director: Massimiliano Menegatti
- Coach: Egidio Notaristefano
- Vice Coach: Giampaolo Ceramicola
- Goalkeepers Coach: Gianluigi Gasparoni
- Fitness Coach: Andrea Bocchio
- Team Manager: Andrea La Rosa
- Observer: Fabio Artico
- Warehouser: Gianfranco Sguaizer

Medical staff

- Director: Guido Ferraris
- Team Doctor: Biagio Polla
- Masseur: Luigi Marostica

== Players ==
=== Transfers ===
==== In ====
—	GK	ITA	Marco Pavanello (from Giacomense)
—	DF	ITA	Mirko Barbagli (from Foligno, end of loan)
—	DF	ITA	Andrea Boron (from Este, via Padova)
—	DF	ITA	Giacomo Gambaretti (from Pro Patria)
—	DF	ITA	Tommaso Ghinassi (from Prato, end of loan)
—	DF	ITA	Andrea Mazzuoli (from Sambenedettese, via Siena)
—	MF	ITA	Nicolò Bianchi (from Novara)
—	MF	ITA	Simone Caciagli (from Giacomense)
—	MF	ITA	Alberto Filiciotto (from Montichiari)
—	MF	ITA	Luca Mora (from Pro Patria)
—	MF	ITA	Filippo Tanaglia (from Giacomense)
—	DF	ITA	Daniele Degano (from Rimini, end of loan)
—	FW	ITA	Andrea Ferretti (from Treviso)
—	FW	ITA	Davide Rossi (from Valenzana, via Cremonese)

==== Out ====
—	GK	ITA	Tupac De Marco (to Giacomense)
—	DF	ITA	Fabio Cusaro (to Tritium, via Cesena)
—	DF	ITA	Daniele Daino
—	DF	ITA	Alessandro Marchetti (to Botev Vratsa, via Carrarese)
—	DF	ITA	Roberto Sabato (to Forlì)
—	DF	ITA	Tommaso Ghinassi (to Prato)
—	MF	ITA	André Cuneaz (to Vallée d’Aoste)
—	MF	ITA	Salvatore Giardina
—	MF	ITA	Giovanni Motta (to Acqui)
—	MF	ITA	Matteo Negrini
—	MF	ITA	Davide Nocciola (to Vallée d’Aoste, via Pro Vercelli)
—	MF	ITA	Gianluca Segarelli
—	FW	BRA	Guilherme Appelt Pires (to Juventus, end of loan)
—	FW	ITA	Fabio Artico (retired)
—	FW	ITA	Fabio Barichello (to Bassano Virtus, end of loan)
—	FW	ITA	Roberto Floriano (to Botev Vratsa, via Tritium)
—	FW	ITA	Marco Martini (to Cuneo)
—	FW	ITA	Maurizio Nassi
—	FW	ITA	Stefano Santoni (to Pro Vercelli, end of loan)

=== Profiles and statistics ===
Role	Player	Born	Apps	Goals	Apps	Goals	Apps	Goals
Role	Player	Born	Lega Pro 2D		Coppa Italia Lega Pro		Total	
DF	(Italy) Mirko Barbagli	1982	8	0	1	0	8	0
FW	(Italy) Davide Bertocchi	1992	5	0	1	0	6	0
MF	(Italy) Nicolò Bianchi	1992	8	0	2	0	10	0
DF	(Italy) Andrea Boron	1993	8	0	2	0	10	0
MF	(Italy) Simone Caciagli	1989	9	0	1	0	10	0
DF	(Italy) Vincenzo Cammaroto	1983	11	1	1	0	12	1
FW	(Italy) Daniele Degano	1982	11	8	2	0	13	8
FW	(Italy) Jacopo Fanucchi	1981	10	3	2	0	12	3
FW	(Italy) Andrea Ferretti	1985	10	3	2	0	12	3
MF	(Italy) Alberto Filiciotto	1992	8	0	1	0	9	0
DF	(Italy) Giacomo Gambaretti	1992	13	1	2	0	15	1
DF	(Italy) Tommaso Ghinassi	1987	–	–	1	0	1	0
FW	(Italy) Marco Martini	1979	–	–	1	0	1	0
DF	(Italy) Andrea Mazzuoli	1992	6	0	2	0	8	0
MF	(Italy) Roberto Menassi	1981	6	0	1	0	7	0
MF	(Italy) Luca Mora	1988	12	0	2	0	14	0
GK	(Italy) Marco Pavanello	1991	–	–	1	−1	1	-1
MF	(Italy) Fabio Roselli	1983	12	0	1	0	13	0
FW	(Italy) Davide Rossi	1992	10	3	–	–	10	3
GK	(Italy) Andrea Servili	1975	13	−9	1	−1	14	-10
MF	(Italy) Filippo Tanaglia	1990	8	1	–	–	8	1
DF	(Italy) Federico Viviani	1981	7	1	1	0	8	1

Legend:

- Footballers who left the team after the beginning of the season.

== Matches ==
=== Lega Pro Seconda Divisione ===
2 September 2012 1	Fano	0–6	Alessandria	Fano
		Report	10' Fanucchi; 17', 41' Ferretti; 62', 68' Degano; 72' Tanaglia	Stadium: Stadio Raffaele Mancini; Referee: Ripa (Nocera Inferiore)

9 September 2012 2	Alessandria	1–2	Pro Patria	Alessandria
	Degano 75'	Report	30', 37' Falomi	Stadium: Stadio Giuseppe Moccagatta; Referee: Magnani (Frosinone)

16 September 2012 3	Forlì	0–1	Alessandria	Forlì
		Report	72' Rossi	Stadium: Stadio Tullo Morgagni; Referee: Di Martino (Teramo)

23 September 2012 4	Alessandria	2–0	Santarcangelo	Alessandria
	Gambaretti 4'; Degano 39' (pen.)	Report		Stadium: Stadio Giuseppe Moccagatta; Referee: Pelagatti (Arezzo)

30 September 2012 5	Alessandria	5–1	Milazzo	Alessandria
	Viviani 2'; Rossi 20'; Cammaroto 49'; Degano 61'; Fanucchi 90'	Report	Mignogna 14'	Stadium: Stadio Giuseppe Moccagatta; Referee: Ceccarelli (Rimini)

7 October 2012 6	Bassano Virtus	1–0	Alessandria	Bassano del Grappa
	Conti 72'	Report		Stadium: Stadio Rino Mercante; Referee: Todaro (Palermo)

14 October 2012 7	Alessandria	1–1	Vallée d’Aoste	Alessandria
	Degano 90+4'	Report	Amato 73'	Stadium: Stadio Giuseppe Moccagatta; Referee: Guccini (Albano Laziale)

21 October 2012 8	Savona	1–0	Alessandria	Savona
	Virdis 3'	Report		Stadium: Stadio Valerio Bacigalupo; Referee: Merlino (Udine)

27 October 2012 9	Alessandria	0–1	Castiglione	Alessandria
		Report	Ferrari 73'	Stadium: Stadio Giuseppe Moccagatta; Referee: Brodo (Viterbo)

4 November 2012 10	Giacomense	1–2	Alessandria	Portomaggiore
	Cenerini 79'	Report	Rossi 25'; Degano 36'	Stadium: Stadio Savino Bellini; Referee: Brasi (Seregno)

11 November 2012 11	Alessandria	0–0	Monza	Alessandria
		Report		Stadium: Stadio Giuseppe Moccagatta; Referee: Paolini (Ascoli Piceno)

18 November 2012 12	Casale	1–1	Alessandria	Casale Monferrato
	Curcio 41'	Report	Ferretti 54'	Stadium: Stadio Natale Palli; Referee: Benassi (Bologna)

25 November 2012 13	Alessandria	2–1	Rimini	Alessandria
	Fanucchi 1'; Degano 59'	Report	Brighi 90'	Stadium: Stadio Giuseppe Moccagatta; Referee: Rocca (Vibo Valentia)

2 December 2012 14	Venezia	0–1	Alessandria	Venice
		Report	Fanucchi 10'	Stadium: Stadio Pier Luigi Penzo; Referee: Valerio Marini (Rome)

9 December 2012 15	Alessandria	0–2	Renate	Alessandria
		Report	Gaeta 49', 53'	Stadium: Stadio Giuseppe Moccagatta; Referee: Vincenzo Todaro (Palermo)

16 December 2012 16	Mantova	2–2	Alessandria	Mantova
	Corso 33'; Del Sante 68'	Report	Rossi 29', 82'	Stadium: Stadio Danilo Martelli; Referee: Luca Albertini (Ascoli Piceno)

22 December 2012 17	Alessandria	3–1	Bellaria Igea	Alessandria
	Mora 22'; Rossi 33'; Cammaroto 49' (pen.)	Report	Nicastro 34'	Stadium: Stadio Giuseppe Moccagatta; Referee: Mirko Oliveri (Palermo)

6 January 2013 18	Alessandria	2–0	Fano	Alessandria
	Fanucchi 57'; Rossi 66'	Report		Stadium: Stadio Giuseppe Moccagatta; Referee: Fabio Piscopo (Imperia)

13 January 2013 19	Pro Patria	3–2	Alessandria	Busto Arsizio
	Fanucchi 58', 72'	Report	Bruccini 15'; Cozzolino 35'; Falomi 37'	Stadium: Stadio Carlo Speroni; Referee: Lorenzo Illuzzi (Molfetta)

20 January 2013 20	Alessandria	Postponed	Forlì	Alessandria
		Report		Stadium: Stadio Giuseppe Moccagatta; Referee: Alessio Petroni (Rome)

27 January 2013 21	Santarcangelo	1–1	Alessandria	Santarcangelo di Romagna
	Graziani 51'	Report	Barbagli 73'	Stadium: Stadio Valentino Mazzola; Referee: Marco Mainardi (Bergamo)

3 February 2013 22	Milazzo	1–2	Alessandria	Milazzo
	Mora 56', 58'	Report	Suriano 16'	Stadium: Stadio Grotta Polifemo; Referee: Federico Fanton (Lodi)

9 February 2013 20	Alessandria	1–1	Forlì	Alessandria
	Ferretti 15'	Report	Petrascu 68'	Stadium: Stadio Giuseppe Moccagatta; Referee: Alessio Petroni (Rome)

17 February 2013 23	Alessandria	1–0	Bassano Virtus	Alessandria
	Viviani 18'	Report		Stadium: Stadio Giuseppe Moccagatta; Referee: Francesco Strocchia (Nola)

24 February 2013 24	Vallée d’Aoste	Postponed	Alessandria	San Giusto Canavese
		Report		Stadium: Stadio Franco Cerutti; Referee: Daniele Martinelli (Rome)

3 March 2013 25	Alessandria	0–2	Savona	Alessandria
		Report	Virdis 5', 72'	Stadium: Stadio Giuseppe Moccagatta; Referee: Rosario Abisso (Palermo)

10 March 2013 26	Castiglione	0–0	Alessandria	Mantova
		Report		Stadium: Stadio Danilo Martelli; Referee: Mirko Mangialardi (Pistoia)

13 March 2013 24	Vallée d’Aoste	1–0	Alessandria	San Giusto Canavese
	Nocciolo 75'	Report		Stadium: Stadio Franco Cerutti; Referee: Daniele Martinelli (Rome)

17 March 2013 27	Alessandria	0–2	Giacomense	Alessandria
		Report	Personè 65'; Serlini 85'	Stadium: Stadio Giuseppe Moccagatta; Referee: Andrea Morreale (Rome)

24 March 2013 28	Monza	2–0	Alessandria	Monza
	Finotto 51'; Gasbarroni 86'	Report		Stadium: Stadio Comunale Brianteo; Referee: Gianluca Aureliano (Bologna)

7 April 2013 29	Alessandria	1–0	Casale	Alessandria
	Fanucchi 11' (pen.)	Report		Stadium: Stadio Giuseppe Moccagatta; Referee: Daniele Bindoni (Venice)

14 April 2013 30	Rimini	0–1	Alessandria	Rimini
		Report	Fanucchi 87'	Stadium: Stadio Romeo Neri; Referee: Giuseppe Cifelli (Campobasso)

21 April 2013 31	Alessandria	0–0	Venezia	Alessandria
		Report		Stadium: Stadio Giuseppe Moccagatta; Referee: Valerio Marini (Rome)

28 April 2013 32	Renate	1–1	Alessandria	Meda
	Ferrari 39'	Report	Ferretti 90' (pen.)	Stadium: Stadio Città di Meda; Referee: Stefano Giovani (Grosseto)

5 May 2013 33	Alessandria	1–0	Mantova	Alessandria
	Ferretti 56'	Report		Stadium: Stadio Giuseppe Moccagatta; Referee: Antonio Eros Lacagnina (Caltanissetta)

12 May 2013 34	Bellaria Igea	1–1	Alessandria	Bellaria – Igea Marina
	Tattini 67'	Report	Ferretti 34'	Stadium: Stadio Enrico Nanni; Referee: Carmine Pierro (Nola)

=== Coppa Italia Lega Pro ===
19 August 2012 1st, 1	Alessandria	1–1	Pavia	Alessandria
	Martini 28'	Report	36' Scampini	Stadium: Stadio Giuseppe Moccagatta; Referee: Ghersini (Genoa)

26 August 2012 1st, 2	Savona	1–0	Alessandria	Savona
	Demartis 35'	Report		Stadium: Stadio Valerio Bacigalupo; Referee: Olivieri (Palermo)

== Championship statistics ==
=== Results by round ===
Round	1	2	3	4	5	6	7	8	9	10	11	12	13	14	15	16	17	18	19	20	21	22	23	24	25	26	27	28	29	30	31	32	33	34
Ground	A	H	A	H	H	A	H	A	H	A	H	A	H	A	H	A	H	H	A	H	A	A	H	A	H	A	H	A	H	A	H	A	H	A
Result	W	L	W	W	W	L	D	L	L	W	D	D	W	W	L	D	W	W	L	D	D	W	W	L	L	D	L	L	W	W	D	D	W	D
Position	1	6	2	2	1	4	3	6	7	6	7	7	5	4	6	6	5	5	6	6	6	5	5	6		8	9	9	9	8	8	8	8	8

Updated to match(es) played on 21 April 2013. Source: alessandriacalcio.it
A = Away; H = Home; W = Win; D = Draw; L = Loss

=== Results summary ===
Overall								Home						Away					
Pld	W	D	L	GF	GA	GD	Pts	W	D	L	GF	GA	GD	W	D	L	GF	GA	GD
34	14	9	11	40	29	+11	51	8	4	5	19	13	+6	6	5	6	21	16	+5

Last updated: 21 April 2013.
