= 2013–14 US Alessandria Calcio 1912 season =

U.S. Alessandria Calcio 1912
2013–14 season
- Chairman: (Italy) Maurizio Pavignano
- Head Coach: (Italy) Egidio Notaristefano
- Stadium: Stadio Giuseppe Moccagatta, Alessandria
- Lega Pro 2D: 8th (after 10th Round)
- Coppa Italia LP: 1st round
- Top goalscorer: Michele Valentini (2)
Home colours	Away colours

The 2013–14 season of U.S. Alessandria Calcio 1912's was their 93rd in Italian football and their 17th in Lega Pro Seconda Divisione (former Serie C2).

== Staff ==
Head coach

- (Italy) Egidio Notaristefano

Assistant coach

- (Italy) Giampaolo Ceramicola

Fitness coach

- (Italy) Francesco Benassi, Andrea Bocchio

Goalkeeper coach

- (Italy) Gian Luigi Gasparoni

Sporting Director

- (Italy) Massimiliano Menegatti

Team Manager

- (Italy) Andrea La Rosa

Medical staff

Director

- Dr. Elena Bellinzona

Team Doctor

- Dr. Biagio Polla

Masseur/Physiotherapist

- Luigi Marostica

== Players ==
=== Transfers ===
==== In ====
—	DF	ITA	Alex Sirri (from Giacomense)
—	MF	ITA	Francesco Ferrini (from Pavia)
—	DF	ITA	Roberto Sabato (from Forlì)
—	FW	ITA	Fausto Ferrari (from Lumezzane)
—	FW	FRA	Julien Rantier (from Perugia)
—	FW	ITA	Luigi Scotto (from Savona)
—	DF	ITA	Alessio Mariotti (from Catanzaro)
—	FW	ITA	Riccardo Taddei (from Rimini)
—	FW	ITA	Michele Marconi (from Venezia)

==== Out ====
—	MF	ITA	Jacopo Fanucchi (released)
—	FW	ITA	Daniele Degano (to Ancona)
—	MF	ITA	Fabio Roselli (released)
—	FW	ITA	Andrea Ferretti (to Tuttocuoio San Miniato)
—	DF	ITA	Andrea Boron (to Forlì)
—	GK	ITA	Marco Pavanello (to Chievo)

=== Profiles and statistics ===
Role	Player	Born	Apps	Goals	Apps	Goals	Apps	Goals
Role	Player	Born	Lega Pro 2D		Coppa Italia Lega Pro		Total	
Goalkeepers
GK	(Italy) Andrea Servili	1975	0	0	0	0	0	0
GK	(Italy) Andrea Capra	1995	0	0	0	0	0	0
GK	(Italy) Giacomo Poluzzi	1988	2	0	0	0	2	0
Defenders
DF	(Italy) Alessio Mariotti	1984	1	0	0	0	1	0
DF	(Italy) Alex Sirri	1991	1	0	0	0	1	0
DF	(Italy) Andrea Mazzuoli	1992	0	0	0	0	0	0
DF	(Italy) Vincenzo Cammaroto	1983	2	0	0	0	2	0
DF	(Italy) Andrea Pappaianni	1993	0	0	0	0	0	0
DF	(Italy) Dario Romano	1991	0	0	0	0	0	0
DF	(Italy) Federico Viviani	1981	2	1	0	0	2	1
DF	(Italy) Roberto Sabato	1987	2	0	0	0	2	0
MF	(Italy) Alberto Filiciotto	1992	1	0	0	0	1	0
Midfielders
MF	(Italy) Filippo Tanaglia	1990	0	0	0	0	0	0
MF	(Italy) Francesco Ferrini	1985	1	0	0	0	1	0
MF	(Italy) Gabriele Cavalli	1982	2	0	0	0	2	0
MF	(Italy) Giuseppe Picone	1995	0	0	0	0	0	0
MF	(Italy) Luca Mora	1988	2	0	0	0	2	0
MF	(Italy) Michele Valentini	1986	2	0	0	0	2	0
MF	(Italy) Mirco Spighi	1990	2	1	0	0	2	1
MF	(Italy) Simone Caciagli	1989	0	0	0	0	0	0
FW	(Italy) Davide Di Fiore	1994	0	0	0	0	0	0
MF	(Italy) Fausto Ferrari	1980	0	0	0	0	0	0
Forwards
FW	(France) Julien Rantier	1983	2	0	0	0	2	0
FW	(Italy) Luigi Scotto	1990	2	0	0	0	2	0
FW	(Italy) Pier Giorgio Modini	1994	0	0	0	0	0	0
FW	(Italy) Riccardo Taddei	1980	2	0	0	0	2	0
FW	(Italy) Michele Marconii	1989	1	0	0	0	1	0

== Matches ==
=== Lega Pro Seconda Divisione ===
1 September 2013 1	Pergolettese	1–1	Alessandria	Crema
	Bertazzoli 27' (pen.)	Report	7' Spighi	Stadium: Stadio Giuseppe Voltini; Referee: Simone Aversano (Treviso)

8 September 2013 2	Alessandria	1–1	Torres	Alessandria
	Viviano 61'	Report	70' Bottone	Stadium: Stadio Giuseppe Moccagatta; Referee: Antonio Guia (Pisa)

15 September 2013 3	Monza	2–1	Alessandria	Monza
	Sinigaglia 48', 51'	Report	53' Valentini	Stadium: Stadio Comunale Brianteo; Referee: Andrea Giuseppe Zanonato (Vicenza)

22 September 2013 4	Alessandria	4–1	Castiglione	Alessandria
	Valentini 19'; Taddei 32'; Rantier 60'; Cavalli 81' (pen.)	Report	22' Curcio	Stadium: Stadio Giuseppe Moccagatta; Referee: Luigi Pillitteri (Palermo)

29 September 2013 5	Real Vicenza	0–2	Alessandria	Vicenza
		Report	20' Mora; 52' Cavalli	Stadium: Stadio Romeo Menti; Referee: Stefano Casaluci (Lecce)

6 October 2013 6	Alessandria	0–0	SPAL	Alessandria
				Stadium: Stadio Giuseppe Moccagatta; Referee: Domenico Rocca (Vibo Valentia)

13 October 2013 7	Alessandria	1–1	Rimini	Alessandria
	Scotto 88'; Sabato (yellow card); Cavalli (yellow card)	Report	39' Baldazzi; Del Solo (yellow card); Nicastro (yellow card)	Stadium: Stadio Giuseppe Moccagatta; Referee: Pasquale Boggi (Salerno)

20 October 2013 8	Renate	0–0	Alessandria	Meda
	Chimenti (yellow card); Florian (yellow card); Bernasconi (yellow card)	Report	(yellow card) Valentini	Stadium: Stadio Città di Meda

27 October 2013 9	Alessandria	2–1	Forlì	Alessandria
	Mora 9'; Marconi 23' (pen.); Viviani (red card) 38'; Sirri (yellow card); Cavalli (yellow card); Valentini (yellow card)	Report	39' Forte; (yellow card) Fantini; (yellow card) Evangelisti; (yellow card) Sampaolesi	Stadium: Stadio Giuseppe Moccagatta; Referee: Emanuele Mancini (Fermo)

3 November 2013 10	Bassano Virtus	4–2	Alessandria	Bassano del Grappa
	Maistrello 21'; Semenzato 28'; Proietti 76'; Berrettoni 85'; Rossi (yellow card); Bizzotto (yellow card)	Report	25' Taddei; 86' Marconi (yellow card) 83' (yellow-red card) Sirri; (yellow card) Caciagli	Stadium: Stadio Rino Mercante; Referee: Vito Mastrodonato (Molfetta)

10 November 2013 11	Alessandria	v	Santarcangelo	Alessandria
				Stadium: Stadio Giuseppe Moccagatta

17 November 2013 12	Cuneo	v	Alessandria	Cuneo
				Stadium: Stadio Fratelli Paschiero

24 November 2013 13	Mantova	v	Alessandria	Mantova
				Stadium: Stadio Danilo Martelli

1 December 2013 14	Alessandria	v	Virtus Verona	Alessandria
				Stadium: Stadio Giuseppe Moccagatta

8 December 2013 15	Bellaria Igea	v	Alessandria	Bellaria – Igea Marina
				Stadium: Stadio Enrico Nanni

15 December 2013 16	Alessandria	v	Bra	Alessandria
				Stadium: Stadio Giuseppe Moccagatta

22 December 2013 17	Delta Porto Tolle	v	Alessandria	Porto Tolle
				Stadium: Stadio Comunale

5 January 2014 18	Alessandria	v	Pergolettese	Alessandria
				Stadium: Stadio Giuseppe Moccagatta

12 January 2014 19	Torres	v	Alessandria	Sassari
				Stadium: Stadio Vanni Sanna

19 January 2014 20	Alessandria	v	Monza	Alessandria
				Stadium: Stadio Giuseppe Moccagatta

26 January 2014 21	Castiglione	v	Alessandria	Castiglione delle Stiviere
				Stadium: Stadio Lusetti

2 February 2014 22	Alessandria	v	Real Vicenza	Alessandria
				Stadium: Stadio Giuseppe Moccagatta

9 February 2014 23	SPAL	v	Alessandria	Ferrara
				Stadium: Stadio Paolo Mazza

16 February 2014 24	Rimini	v	Alessandria	Rimini
				Stadium: Stadio Romeo Neri

23 February 2014 25	Alessandria	v	Renate	Alessandria
				Stadium: Stadio Giuseppe Moccagatta

2 March 2014 26	Forlì	v	Alessandria	Forlì
				Stadium: Stadio Tullo Morgagni

9 March 2014 27	Alessandria	v	Bassano Virtus	Alessandria
				Stadium: Stadio Giuseppe Moccagatta

16 March 2014 28	Santarcangelo	v	Alessandria	Santarcangelo di Romagna
				Stadium: Stadio Valentino Mazzola

23 March 2014 29	Alessandria	v	Cuneo	Alessandria
				Stadium: Stadio Giuseppe Moccagatta

30 March 2014 30	Alessandria	v	Mantova	Alessandria
				Stadium: Stadio Giuseppe Moccagatta

6 April 2014 31	Virtus Verona	v	Alessandria	Verona
				Stadium: Centro Sportivo Gavagnin

13 April 2014 32	Alessandria	v	Bellaria Igea	Alessandria
				Stadium: Stadio Giuseppe Moccagatta

27 April 2014 33	Bra	v	Alessandria	Bra
				Stadium: Stadio Madonna dei Fiori

4 May 2014 34	Alessandria	v	Delta Porto Tolle	Alessandria
				Stadium: Stadio Giuseppe Moccagatta

=== Coppa Italia Lega Pro ===
18 August 2013 1st, 1	Bra	1–1	Alessandria	Bra
	Barbaro 59'	Report	8' Rantier	Stadium: Stadio Madonna dei Fiori; Referee: Antonio Giua (Pisa)

== Championship statistics ==
=== Results by round ===
Round	1	2	3	4	5	6	7	8	9	10	11	12	13	14	15	16	17	18	19	20	21	22	23	24	25	26	27	28	29	30	31	32	33	34
Ground	A	H	A	H	A	H	H	A	H	A	H	A	A	H	A	H	A	H	A	H	A	H	A	A	A	A	H	A	H	H	H	A	H	H
Result	D	D	L	W	W	D	D	D	W	L																								
Position	7	8	14	9	4	7	9	9	7	8																								

Updated to match(es) played on 22 September 2013. Source: alessandriacalcio.it
A = Away; H = Home; W = Win; D = Draw; L = Loss

=== Results summary ===
Overall								Home						Away					
Pld	W	D	L	GF	GA	GD	Pts	W	D	L	GF	GA	GD	W	D	L	GF	GA	GD
10	3	5	2	14	11	+3	14	2	3	0	8	4	+4	1	2	2	6	7	−1

Last updated: 11 August 2013.
