= 2007–08 Genoa CFC season =

Genoa
2007–08 season
- Chairman: Enrico Preziosi
- Head Coach: Gian Piero Gasperini
- Serie A: 10th
- Top goalscorer: Marco Borriello (19)
- Highest home attendance: 54,700 vs Milan (27 January 2009)
- Lowest home attendance: 6,483 vs Empoli (16 December 2008)

The 2007–08 Genoa CFC season is the 1st since the promotion from the 2006-07 Serie B season. This article lists its season results, transfers, and statistics.

== Current squad ==
Note: Flags indicate national team as defined under FIFA eligibility rules; some limited exceptions apply. Players may hold more than one non-FIFA nationality.

No.	Pos.	Nation	Player
1	GK	(Ecuador) ECU	Damián Lanza
3	DF	(Italy) ITA	Cesare Bovo
7	MF	(Italy) ITA	Marco Rossi
8	MF	(Brazil) BRA	Danilo Sacramento
9	FW	(Argentina) ARG	Luciano Figueroa
11	FW	(Honduras) HON	Julio César de León
14	FW	(Italy) ITA	Giuseppe Sculli
15	MF	(Italy) ITA	Silvano Raggio Garibaldi
16	DF	(Italy) ITA	Alessandro Lucarelli
19	MF	(Italy) ITA	Matteo Paro
21	FW	(Italy) ITA	Marco Di Vaio
22	FW	(Italy) ITA	Marco Borriello
23	DF	(Italy) ITA	Tommaso Ghinassi (on loan from Pistoiese)

No.	Pos.	Nation	Player
24	MF	(France) FRA	Abdoulay Konko
25	DF	(Italy) ITA	Gaetano De Rosa
28	MF	(Croatia) CRO	Ivan Jurić
29	MF	(Brazil) BRA	Fabiano
33	DF	(Brazil) BRA	Gleison Santos
68	DF	(Belgium) BEL	Anthony Vanden Borre
73	GK	(Italy) ITA	Alessio Scarpi
77	MF	(Italy) ITA	Omar Milanetto
26	GK	(Brazil) BRA	Rubinho
--	DF	(Italy) ITA	Andrea Masiello
--	MF	(Uruguay) URU	Matías Masiero
--	FW	(Senegal) SEN	Papa Waigo
--	DF	(Italy) ITA	Francesco Bega

== Main transfers and loans ==
=== Summer 2007 ===
==== In ====
Name	Nationality	Moving from	Fee
Alessandro Lucarelli	Italy	Reggina	Undisclosed
Matteo Paro	Italy	Juventus	3.080.000 £
Cesare Bovo	Italy	Palermo	2.904.000 £
Marco Borriello	Italy	Milan	1.760.000 £
Giuseppe Sculli	Italy	Juventus	Free transfer
Gleison Santos	Brazil	AlbinoLeffe	Free transfer
Danilo Sacramento	Brazil	(Brazil) Ponte Preta	Free transfer
Abdoulay Konko	France	Siena	Undisclosed
Papa Waigo	Senegal	Cesena	Undisclosed
Damián Lanza	Ecuador	Arezzo	Undisclosed
Tommaso Ghinassi	Italy	Pistoiese	Loan

==== Out ====
Name	Nationality	Moving to	Fee
Adaílton	Brazil	Bologna	Free transfer
Cristian Stellini	Italy	Bari	€170,000
Luca Fusco	Italy	Salernitana	Undisclosed
Domenico Criscito	Italy	Juventus	Loan return
Nicola Barasso	Italy	Taranto	Free transfer
Dario Biasi	Italy	Cesena	€100,000
Mirco Gasparetto	Italy	Chievo	Undisclosed
Francesco Galeoto	Italy	Messina	Undisclosed
Filippo Carobbio	Italy	AlbinoLeffe	Undisclosed

=== Winter 2007–08 ===
==== In ====
Name	Nationality	Moving from	Fee
Anthony Vanden Borre	Belgium	Fiorentina	Free transfer
Matias Masiero	Uruguay	(Uruguay) Central Español	Undisclosed

==== Out ====
Name	Nationality	Moving to	Fee
Papa Waigo	Senegal	Fiorentina	Undisclosed
Andrea Masiello	Italy	Bari	Undisclosed
Francesco Bega	Italy	Brescia	Undisclosed

== Competitions ==
=== Serie A ===
==== League table ====
Pos	Team	Pld	W	D	L	GF	GA	GD	Pts	Qualification or relegation
8	Napoli	38	14	8	16	50	53	−3	50	Qualification to Intertoto Cup third round
9	Atalanta	38	12	12	14	52	56	−4	48 (Note: Atalanta finished ahead of Genoa on head-to-head points: Genoa 2-1 Atalanta, Atalanta 2-0 Genoa.)	
10	Genoa	38	13	9	16	44	52	−8	48	
11	Palermo	38	12	11	15	47	57	−10	47	
12	Lazio	38	11	13	14	47	51	−4	46	

Source: Serie A
Rules for classification: 1) points; 2) head-to-head points; 3) head-to-head goal difference; 4) head-to-head goals scored; 5) goal difference; 6) number of goals scored.

==== Matches ====
Competition	Round	Date and time	Opponent team	H/A	Result	Scorers
Serie A	Week 1	26 August 2007– 13:00	Milan	H	0-3
Serie A	Week 2	2 September 2007 – 13:00	Catania	A	0-0
Serie A	Week 3	16 September 2007 – 13:00	Livorno	H	1-1	Borriello 57'
Serie A	Week 4	23 September 2007 – 18:30	Sampdoria	A	0-0
Serie A	Week 5	26 September 2007 – 18:30	Udinese	H	3-2	Borriello 20', 47', 73'
Serie A	Week 6	30 September 2007 – 13:00	Napoli	A	1-2	Sculli 89'
Serie A	Week 7	7 October 2007 – 13:00	Cagliari	H	2-0	Borriello 59', Di Vaio 73'
Serie A	Week 8	21 October 2007 – 18:30	Juventus	A	0-1
Serie A	Week 9	28 October 2007 – 19:30	Fiorentina	H	0-0
Serie A	Week 10	31 October 2007 – 19:30	Inter	A	1-4	Konko 72'
Serie A	Week 11	4 November 2007 – 13:00	Palermo	H	3-3	de Léon 59', 66', Borriello 82'
Serie A	Week 12	11 November 2007 – 13:10	Reggina	A	0-2
Serie A	Week 13	24 November 2007 – 16:00	Roma	H	0-1
Serie A	Week 14	2 December 2007 – 18:30	Torino	A	1-1	Borriello 47'
Serie A	Week 15	9 December 2007 – 13:00	Siena	H	1-3	Figueroa 89'
Serie A	Week 16	16 December 2007 – 13:00	Empoli	A	1-1	Masiello 87'
Serie A	Week 17	22 December 2007 – 16:00	Parma	H	1-0	Borriello 43'
Serie A	Week 18	13 January 2008 – 13:00	Lazio	A	2-1	Borriello 51', 55'
Serie A	Week 19	19 January 2008 – 16:00	Atalanta	H	2-1	Borriello 73', Figueroa 84'
Serie A	Week 20	27 January 2008 – 13:00	Milan	A	0-2
Serie A	Week 21	3 February 2008 – 13:00	Catania	H	2–1	Danilo 14', Borriello 71'
Serie A	Week 22	10 February 2008 – 13:00	Livorno	A	1-1	Di Vaio 83'
Serie A	Week 23	17 February 2008 – 13:00	Sampdoria	H	0–1
Serie A	Week 24	24 February 2008 – 13:00	Udinese	A	5-3	de Léon '9, Sculli 43', Borriello 54', 77', 85'
Serie A	Week 25	27 February 2008 – 18:30	Napoli	H	2–0	Sculli '35, Borriello 75'
Serie A	Week 26	2 March 2008 – 13:00	Cagliari	A	1-2	Lucarelli 15'
Serie A	Week 27	9 March 2008 – 18:30	Juventus	H	0-2
Serie A	Week 28	16 March 2008 – 13:00	Fiorentina	A	1-3	Masiero 83'
Serie A	Week 29	19 March 2008 – 18:30	Inter	H	1–1	Borriello 85'
Serie A	Week 30	22 March 2008 – 13:00	Palermo	A	3-2	Figueroa 29', Milanetto 51', Konko 66'
Serie A	Week 31	30 March 2008 – 12:00	Reggina	H	2–0	Borriello 59', Rossi 90+2'
Serie A	Week 32	5 April 2008 – 16:00	Roma	A	2-3	Rossi 58', de Léon
Serie A	Week 33	13 April 2008 – 12:00	Torino	H	3–0	Di Vaio 52', Borriello 61', Sculli 70'
Serie A	Week 34	20 April 2008 – 12:00	Siena	A	1–0	Konko 24'
Serie A	Week 35	20 April 2008 – 12:00	Empoli	H	0-1
Serie A	Week 36	4 May 2008 – 12:00	Parma	A	0-1
Serie A	Week 37	11 May 2008 – 13:00	Lazio	H	0–2
Serie A	Week 38	18 May 2008 – 12:00	Atalanta	A	0-2

==== Goal scorers ====
19 goals

- (Italy) Marco Borriello

4 goals

- (Italy) Giuseppe Sculli

4 goals

- (Italy) Julio César de León

3 goals

- (Italy) Marco Di Vaio
- (Argentina) Luciano Figueroa
- (France) Abdoulay Konko

2 goals

- (Italy) Marco Rossi

1 goal

- (Italy) Alessandro Lucarelli
- (Uruguay) Matías Masiero
- (Italy) Omar Milanetto
- (Italy) Andrea Masiello
- (Brazil) Danilo
