= Simone Pontiggia =

Italian footballer

Personal information
- Date of birth: 27 April 1993 (age 33)
- Place of birth: Lissone, Italy
- Position: Attacking midfielder

Team information
- Current team: Sondrio

Youth career
- Milan
- 2011–2012: AlbinoLeffe

Senior career*
Years	Team	Apps	(Gls)
2012–2014	AlbinoLeffe	29	(3)
2014–2015	Casertana	14	(0)
2015–2016	Monza	8	(1)
2016	Sondrio	13	(3)
2016	Folgore Caratese	12	(0)
2016–	Sondrio		

International career
2012	Italy U20 Lega Pro	1	(1)
- * Club domestic league appearances and goals

Simone Pontiggia (born 27 April 1993) is an Italian footballer who plays as an attacking midfielder for Sondrio Calcio.

== Club career ==
=== Milan ===
Born in Lissone, the Province of Monza–Brianza (historically part of Milan Province), Lombardy, Pontiggia started his career at A.C. Milan. He was part of the under-18 youth team (or called reserve B) in 2010–11 season, but also received call-up to the reserve A for the playoffs round. Previously he was part of Milan's under-17 team in 2009–10 season and was the joint-top-scorer of Milan's under-15 team in 2007–08 playoffs round with 2 goals (along with Alessandro De Respinis).

=== AlbinoLeffe ===
In August 2011 he was transferred to another Lombard club AlbinoLeffe along with Marvin Maietti and Matteo Doni. He won 2012 Trofeo Dossena with the reserve in June 2012. In 2012–13 season he made his professional debut, partially due to the club lack of new signing due to relegatation from Serie B and heavy point penalty in 2012–13 season due to involvement in 2011 Italian football scandal. However it still had heavy competition between the former youth products: Andrea Belotti, Massimiliano Pesenti and Manuel Personè (left in January 2013).

== International career ==
=== representative teams ===
His performances at the start of 2012–13 season made him earned a call-up from the Lega Pro under-20 representative team (all born 1992 or after), and scored in his debut against Croatia U20 in October 2012, just 6 minute after he substituted Francesco Agnello. In December 2012 he received another call-up from Lega Pro, but from "U19 team" (despite the team consist of players born 1993 or after, the U19 A team in fact in born 1994 season), for a triangular tournament between U19 A team and Serie D representative team. However he withdrew.
