= Roselli =

Surname

Roselli is an Italian surname. Notable people with the surname include:

- Auro Roselli (1921–2013), Italian resistant, journalist, photographer, writer and inventor
- Bernardo Roselli (born 1965), Uruguayan chess master
- Bob Roselli (1931–2009), American professional baseball player
- Ezio Roselli (1896–1963), Italian gymnast who competed in the 1920 Summer Olympics
- Fabio Roselli (footballer) (born 1983), Italian professional football player
- Fabio Roselli (rugby player) (born 1971), former Italian rugby union player and a current coach
- Giorgio Roselli (born 1957), Italian professional football coach and a former player
- Jimmy Roselli (1925–2011), Italian-American pop singer
- John Roselli (1905–1976), influential mobster for the Chicago Outfit
- Nahuel Roselli (born 1985), Argentine football defender
- Nardia Roselli (born 1990), New Zealand netball player in the ANZ Championship
- Romeo Roselli (born 1980), professional wrestler and actor
- Salvador Roselli, film director and screenplay writer

== See also ==
- MV Mario Roselli, an Italian cargo ship which sank on 11 October 1943 in Corfu Bay, killing some 1,302 Italian POWs
