= Federico Viviani =

Federico Viviani may refer to:

- Federico Viviani (footballer, born 1981), Italian footballer
- Federico Viviani (footballer, born 1992), Italian footballer

== See also ==
- Viviani (surname)
