= Segarelli =

Segarelli is an Italian surname. Notable people with the surname include:

- Francesca Segarelli (born 1990), Dominican Republic tennis player
- Gerard Segarelli (died 1300), Italian Christian religious leader
- Gianluca Segarelli (born 1978), Italian footballer
