= Fabio Mazzeo =

Italian footballer (born 1983)

Personal information
- Date of birth: 24 July 1983 (age 43)
- Place of birth: Salerno, Italy
- Height: 1.83 m (6 ft 0 in)
- Position: Forward

Team information
- Current team: ASD Olympic Salerno (technical coach)

Youth career
- 2001–2002: Salernitana

Senior career*
Years	Team	Apps	(Gls)
2002–2004	Salernitana	8	(0)
2004–2006	Nocerina	62	(20)
2006–2010	Perugia	93	(31)
2009–2010	→ Frosinone (loan)	29	(5)
2010–2011	Cosenza	19	(3)
2011	Atletico Roma	15	(7)
2011–2012	Barletta	31	(14)
2012–2013	Nocerina	28	(10)
2013–2014	Perugia	31	(13)
2014–2016	Benevento	66	(14)
2016–2019	Foggia	97	(45)
2019–2021	Livorno	27	(2)
2021	Potenza	15	(0)
2021–2022	Nocerina	17	(1)
Total		538	(165)
- * Club domestic league appearances and goals

Fabio Mazzeo (born 24 July 1983) is an Italian former footballer who is currently as a technical coach for ASD Olympic Salerno.

== Career ==
Mazzeo started his career at Salernitana. He then played for Serie C2 club Nocerina and Perugia of Serie C1.

In August 2009, Mazzeo left for Frosinone in Serie B on loan with Marco Martini and Massimo Perra moved to opposite direction.

After the bankruptcy of Perugia Calcio, he was signed by Cosenza. In January 2011 he was signed by Atletico Roma. Both clubs bankrupted at the end of season.

On 11 July 2011 he was signed by Barletta.

On 20 July 2012 he was signed by Nocerina.

On 12 August 2013, the forward comes back to Perugia, having signed a two-year contract with the Grifoni.

On 17 July 2019, he signed with Livorno for a reported £2,000 week contract.

On 1 February 2021, his contract with Livorno was terminated by mutual consent, and he signed with Potenza as a free agent.
