= Suriano =

Suriano is an Italian surname. Notable people with the surname include:

- Domenico Suriano (born 1988), Italian footballer
- Francesco Suriano, 15th-century Italian Franciscan friar and Holy Land traveller
- Francisco Suriano (born 1978), Salvadoran swimmer
- Giuseppina Suriano (1915–1950), Italian Roman Catholic
- Philip Suriano (born 1948), American actor
