= Angelo Siniscalchi =

Italian footballer (born 1984)

Personal information
- Date of birth: 15 July 1984 (age 42)
- Place of birth: Salerno, Italy
- Height: 1.86 m (6 ft 1 in)
- Position: Defender

Team information
- Current team: AC Rezzato

Youth career
- Salernitana

Senior career*
Years	Team	Apps	(Gls)
2003–2007	Salernitana	45	(0)
2004–2005	→ Bellaria (loan)	30	(0)
2007–2010	Ascoli	7	(0)
2008–2009	→ Pescara (loan)	24	(2)
2009–2010	→ PortoSummaga (loan)	26	(0)
2010–2013	Benevento	66	(2)
2013–2014	Salernitana	13	(1)
2014–2015	Mantova	30	(0)
2015–2016	Pavia	24	(1)
2016–2017	Mantova	31	(1)
2017–	AC Rezzato	14	(0)
- * Club domestic league appearances and goals as of 13:19, 17 December 2019 (UTC)

Angelo Siniscalchi (born 15 July 1984) is an Italian footballer who plays for Serie D club AC Rezzato.

== Biography ==
Born in Salerno, Campania, Siniscalchi started his career at hometown club Salernitana. Siniscalchi made his league debut on 31 May 2005, along with Gianmarco Rodio replaced Agostino Garofalo and Luca Fusco respectively. Salernitana certainly finished as the bottom but later re-admitted to Serie B 2003–04 due to Caso Catania. In 2004–05 season, he left for Serie C2 club Bellaria

After Salernitana Sport went bankrupt and re-admitted to Serie C1 as Salernitana Calcio 1919 in 2005, Siniscalchi re-joined the new team in the Italian third division. He played for Salernitana in Serie C1 seasons.

In July 2007, he left for Serie B side Ascoli in co-ownership deal. Ascoli relegated from Serie A just 2 months earlier. However, Siniscalchi failed to become a regular starter partially due to injury. He left for Lega Pro Prima Divisione side Pescara on 1 September 2008. In June 2009, Ascoli and Salernitana failed to agree a price for the remain 50% registration rights, and Ascoli won the closed tender as the club submitted a higher bid against Salernitana to Lega Calcio. On 27 August 2009, he was loaned to Prima Divisione side PortoSummaga, where he won promotion to Serie B.

In July 2010, he was sold to Prima Divisione side Benevento in co-ownership deal, signed a 3-year contract. He started the first 5 matches so far with the Campania side, including the two 2010–11 Coppa Italia matches.

On 24 July 2013 he moved to Lega Pro Prima Divisione club Salernitana.

On 25 July 2015 Siniscalchi joined A.C. Pavia.

== Honours ==
- Lega Pro Prima Divisione: 2010
