= Viviani =

Viviani is a surname. Notable people with the surname include:

- Anselmo Viviani (1915–?), Italian cross-country skier
- Antonio Viviani (1560–1620), Italian painter
- Attilio Viviani (born 1996), Italian cyclist
- Elia Viviani (born 1989), Italian cyclist
- Fabio Viviani (chef) (born 1978), Italian chef, restaurateur, and cookbook writer
- Fabio Viviani (footballer) (born 1966), Italian football manager and former player
- Federico Viviani (footballer, born 1981), Italian former footballer
- Federico Viviani (footballer, born 1992), Italian footballer
- Guillermo Viviani (1893–1964), Chilean Roman Catholic priest and trade unionist
- Giovanni Buonaventura Viviani (1638–1693), composer and violinist
- Jody Viviani (born 1982), French former footballer
- Luigi Viviani (born 1937), Italian politician and trade unionist
- Luigi Viviani (composer), 19th-century opera composer – see Felice Romani
- Luigi Viviani (soldier) (1903–1943), Italian engineer and captain
- Ottavio Viviani (c. 1579–c. 1641), Italian painter
- Raffaele Viviani (1888–1950), Italian author, playwright, and actor
- René Viviani (1863–1925), French politician and prime minister
- Vincenzo Viviani (1622–1703), Italian mathematician and scientist
- Vincenzo Viviani (politician) (born 1938), Italian magistrate and politician

== See also ==
- Square René Viviani
- Stadio Alfredo Viviani
- Viviani (crater)
- Viviani's curve
- Viviani's theorem
