= Taugourdeau =

Taugourdeau is a French surname. Notable people with the surname include:

- Jean-Charles Taugourdeau (born 1953), French politician
- Anthony Taugourdeau (born 1989), French footballer
