= Auro =

Auro may refer to:

== People ==
- Auro de Moura Andrade (1915–1982), Brazilian politician
- Auro Roselli (1921–2013), Italian journalist
- Auro Jr. (born 1996), Brazilian footballer

== Other uses ==
- Auro-3D, 3D audio format
- Auro 11.1, cinematic speaker layout
- AURO University, Indian private university
- AURO system, Autonomous Ropeway Operation
- Auro (restaurant). a Michelin-starred restaurant in Calistoga, California
