= Fabio Roselli =

Fabio Roselli may refer to:

- Fabio Roselli (footballer) (born 1983), Italian footballer
- Fabio Roselli (rugby union) (born 1971), Italian rugby union coach and former player
