= Michele Valentini =

Italian footballer

Personal information
- Date of birth: 29 June 1986 (age 40)
- Place of birth: Cesena, Italy
- Height: 1.86 m (6 ft 1 in)
- Position: Midfielder

Senior career*
Years	Team	Apps	(Gls)
2005–2007	Bellaria Igea	48	(2)
2007–2008	Pavia	27	(3)
2008–2009	Sangiovannese	13	(0)
2009–2010	Valenzana	8	(0)
2010–2011	Giacomense	28	(4)
2011–2013	Teramo	61	(9)
2013–2015	Alessandria	53	(11)
2015–2016	Campobasso	18	(2)
2016–2017	Santarcangelo	45	(5)
2017–2019	Imolese	66	(9)
2019–2020	Mantova	15	(3)
2020–2021	Clodiense	17	(0)
- * Club domestic league appearances and goals as of 00:12, 17 June 2021 (UTC)

Michele Valentini (born 9 June 1986) is an Italian professional footballer who plays as a midfielder. Valentini spent his entire career between the Italian Serie C and Serie D with 399 appearances across the competitions.

== Club career ==
He began his career with Bellaria Igea in 2005, and from there had stints with Pavia, Sangiovannese, Valenzana, and Giacomense. He helped Teramo get promoted to the Serie C for the 2011–12 season. He then had stints at Alessandria, Campobasso, Santarcangelo, and Imolese who he also helped promoted to Serie C as their captain. Finally, he moved to Mantova, and Clodiense.
