= 2021–22 Serie D =

Serie D
- Season: 2021–22
- Dates: Regular season: 18 September 2021 – 15 May 2022
- Champions: Recanatese (1st title)
- Promoted: Novara; Sangiuliano City Nova; Arzignano; Rimini; San Donato Tavarnelle; Recanatese; Giugliano; Audace Cerignola; Gelbison; Torres
- Relegated: RG Ticino; Imperia; Lavagnese; Saluzzo; Caravaggio; Brianza Olginatese; Vis Nova Giussano; Leon; Ambrosiana; Spinea; Cattolica; San Martino Speme; Sasso Marconi; Progresso; Borgo San Donnino; Tritium; Foligno; UniPomezia; Cannara; Pro Livorno; Castelfidardo; Castelnuovo Vomano; Nereto; Aurora Alto Casertano; Carbonia; Insieme Formia; Lanusei; Latte Dolce; Rotonda; San Giorgio; Bisceglie; Virtus Matino; Rende; Troina; Biancavilla; FC Messina (excluded)

The 2021–22 Serie D was the seventy-third season of the top level Italian non-professional football championship. It represents the fourth tier in the Italian football league system.

== Rules ==
The season will provide a total nine promotions to Serie C (those being the winners of all nine groups). Teams placed between second and fifth for each group will play a so-called "playoff tournament", starting with two one-legged games played at the best placed team's home venue:

- 2nd-placed team vs 5th-placed team;
- 3rd-placed team vs 4th-placed team.

In case of a draw by the end of the game, two extra times will be played; in case of no winner after that, the best-placed team will advance to the final.

The two winning teams will then play a one-legged final, to be hosted at the best placed team's home venue, with the same rules as in the first round. The nine playoff winners for each group will be prioritised to fill any potential Serie C league vacancies.

The two bottom-placed teams for each league group are automatically relegated to Eccellenza. Two two-legged relegation playoff games (known in Italian as "play-out") will therefore be played between:

- 13th-placed team vs 16th-placed team (for 18-team groups), or 15th-placed team vs 18th-placed team (for 20-team groups);
- 14th-placed team vs 15th-placed team (for 18-team groups), or 16th-placed team vs 17th-placed team (for 20-team groups).

In case of an aggregate draw after the second leg, two extra times will be played; in case of further aggregate draw, the worst-placed team will be relegated.

In case the two teams will have a league gap of at least eight points, the relegation playoff will not take place and the worst-placed team will be automatically relegated instead.

== Teams ==
The composition of the league involves nine divisions, grouped geographically and named alphabetically.

=== Teams relegated from Serie C ===
Five teams were directly relegated from the 2020–21 Serie C: Fano, Ravenna, Arezzo, Bisceglie, Cavese.

Novara were admitted via Article 52 of N.O.I.F.

Casertana and Sambenedettese, originally excluded from Serie C, were later readmitted to Serie D by sentence of the Regional Administrative Court of Lazio.

=== Teams promoted from Eccellenza ===
The following teams were promoted from Eccellenza:

Abruzzo

- Chieti

Apulia

- Virtus Matino

Calabria

- Lamezia Terme

Campania

- San Giorgio
- Mariglianese

Emilia Romagna

- Borgo San Donnino

Lazio

- UniPomezia
- Real Monterotondo Scalo

Liguria

- Ligorna

Lombardy

- Brianza Olginatese
- Leon
- Alcione

Marche

- Porto d'Ascoli

Molise

- Aurora Alto Casertano

Piedmont & Aosta Valley

- Asti
- RG Ticino

Sardinia

- Atletico Uri

Sicily

- Sancataldese
- Giarre

Trentino Alto Adige – Südtirol

- Levico Terme

Tuscany

- Poggibonsi
- Cascina

Veneto

- Spinea
- San Martino Speme

=== Changes during the season ===
On 15 December 2021, debt-ridden FC Messina was excluded from the league with immediate effect due to having failed to show up for two consecutive league games; as the exclusion happened before mid-season, all previous games involving the club were voided.

== Group A ==
Pos	Team	Pld	W	D	L	GF	GA	GD	Pts	Promotion, qualification or relegation
1	Novara (C, P)	38	25	10	3	75	27	+48	85	Promotion to Serie C (Note: If two or more teams finish tied on points in the top of the league, once the tie-breaking criteria have applied, the 1st and the 2nd-placed teams play a tie-breaker, whose winner gets promotion to Serie C.)
2	Sanremese (Q)	38	23	8	7	69	38	+31	77	Qualification for promotion play-offs (Note: Winning play-offs doesn't grant promotion to Serie C, but a chance to get readmitted in case of vacancies.)
3	Casale (Q)	38	17	13	8	49	30	+19	64	Qualification for promotion play-offs
4	Città di Varese (Q)	38	17	12	9	53	34	+19	63	Qualification for promotion play-offs
5	Bra (Q)	38	15	10	13	41	43	−2	55	Qualification for promotion play-offs
6	Derthona	38	14	13	11	48	44	+4	55	
7	Caronnese	38	13	14	11	40	34	+6	53	
8	Borgosesia	38	13	13	12	47	41	+6	52	
9	Chieri	38	13	13	12	44	40	+4	52	
10	Sestri Levante	38	13	13	12	45	47	−2	52	
11	Gozzano	38	12	15	11	43	29	+14	51	
12	Ligorna	38	12	12	14	44	45	−1	48	
13	Vado	38	11	15	12	42	51	−9	48	
14	PDHAE	38	12	12	14	43	53	−10	48	
15	Asti	38	9	20	9	40	41	−1	47	
16	Fossano	38	12	8	18	38	62	−24	44	Qualification for relegation play-outs (Note: If the 15th-placed team finishes 9 or more points ahead of the 18th-placed team, then the relegation play-out is not played and the 18th-placed team is relegated to Eccellenza directly. If the 16th-placed team finishes 9 or more points ahead of the 17th-placed team, then the relegation play-out is not played and the 17th-placed team is relegated to Eccellenza directly.)
17	RG Ticino (R)	38	10	14	14	33	45	−12	44	Qualification for relegation play-outs
18	Imperia (R)	38	8	9	21	37	56	−19	33	Relegation to Eccellenza
19	Lavagnese (R)	38	7	9	22	30	62	−32	30	Relegation to Eccellenza
20	Saluzzo (R)	38	3	9	26	20	59	−39	18	Relegation to Eccellenza

Updated to match(es) played on 15 May 2022. Source: Soccerway (in English)
Rules for classification: (Note: 1) Points; 2) Head-to-head points; 3) Head-to-head goal difference; 4) Goal difference; 5) Goals scored; 6) Draw.)
(C) Champions; (P) Promoted; (Q) Qualified to the phase indicated; (R) Relegated

== Group B ==
Pos	Team	Pld	W	D	L	GF	GA	GD	Pts	Promotion, qualification or relegation
1	Sangiuliano City Nova (C, P)	38	25	7	6	81	39	+42	82	Promotion to Serie C
2	Legnano (Q)	38	19	9	10	49	44	+5	66	Qualification for promotion play-offs
3	Casatese (Q)	38	17	13	8	70	44	+26	64	Qualification for promotion play-offs
4	Brusaporto (Q)	38	18	10	10	62	49	+13	64	Qualification for promotion play-offs
5	Folgore Caratese (Q)	38	18	9	11	57	46	+11	63	Qualification for promotion play-offs
6	Desenzano Calvina	38	17	12	9	65	49	+16	63	
7	Breno	38	16	10	12	56	43	+13	58	
8	Virtus CiseranoBergamo	38	15	13	10	66	56	+10	58	
9	Arconatese	38	15	12	11	62	58	+4	57	
10	Franciacorta	38	13	13	12	73	80	−7	52	
11	Castellanzese	38	12	10	16	50	55	−5	46	
12	Crema	38	12	10	16	44	52	−8	46	
13	Sona	38	11	12	15	43	56	−13	45	
14	Real Calepina	38	11	11	16	38	39	−1	44	
15	Ponte San Pietro	38	10	14	14	54	56	−2	44	
16	Villa Valle	38	9	12	17	49	56	−7	39	Qualification for relegation play-outs
17	Caravaggio (R)	38	7	16	15	41	62	−21	37	Qualification for relegation play-outs
18	Brianza Olginatese (R)	38	8	11	19	43	60	−17	35	Relegation to Eccellenza
19	Vis Nova Giussano (R)	38	10	5	23	56	77	−21	35	Relegation to Eccellenza
20	Leon (R)	38	8	9	21	50	88	−38	33	Relegation to Eccellenza

Updated to match(es) played on 15 May 2022. Source: Soccerway (in English)
Rules for classification:
(C) Champions; (P) Promoted; (Q) Qualified for the phase indicated; (R) Relegated

== Group C ==
Pos	Team	Pld	W	D	L	GF	GA	GD	Pts	Promotion, qualification or relegation
1	Arzignano (C, P)	34	21	10	3	74	32	+42	73	Promotion to Serie C
2	Union Clodiense Chioggia (Q)	34	20	12	2	53	22	+31	72	Qualification for promotion play-offs
3	Adriese (Q)	34	19	9	6	61	36	+25	66	Qualification for promotion play-offs
4	Luparense (Q)	34	16	10	8	60	35	+25	58	Qualification for promotion play-offs
5	Campodarsego (Q)	34	15	11	8	48	37	+11	56	Qualification for promotion play-offs
6	Caldiero Terme	34	15	6	13	58	50	+8	51	
7	Dolomiti Bellunesi	34	14	8	12	51	50	+1	50	
8	Montebelluna	34	14	7	13	57	52	+5	49	
9	Mestre	34	13	7	14	36	45	−9	46	
10	Cjarlins Muzane	34	11	12	11	51	43	+8	45	
11	Cartigliano	34	11	12	11	44	40	+4	45	
12	Este	34	10	13	11	31	42	−11	43	
13	Levico Terme	34	11	9	14	31	40	−9	42	
14	Ambrosiana (R)	34	11	7	16	45	52	−7	40	Qualification for relegation play-outs (Note: If the 13th-placed team finishes 9 or more points ahead of the 16th-placed team, then the relegation play-out is not played and the 16th-placed team is relegated to Eccellenza directly. If the 14th-placed team finishes 9 or more points ahead of the 15th-placed team, then the relegation play-out is not played and the 15th-placed team is relegated to Eccellenza directly.)
15	Delta Porto Tolle	34	10	6	18	43	51	−8	36	Qualification for relegation play-outs
16	Spinea (R)	34	6	7	21	27	58	−31	25	Relegation to Eccellenza
17	Cattolica (R)	34	6	5	23	20	61	−41	23	Relegation to Eccellenza
18	San Martino Speme (R)	34	5	5	24	29	73	−44	20	Relegation to Eccellenza

Updated to match(es) played on 15 May 2022. Source: Soccerway (in English)
Rules for classification:
(C) Champions; (P) Promoted; (Q) Qualified for the phase indicated; (R) Relegated

== Group D ==
Pos	Team	Pld	W	D	L	GF	GA	GD	Pts	Promotion, qualification or relegation
1	Rimini (C, P)	38	27	6	5	72	21	+51	87	Promotion to Serie C
2	Ravenna (Q)	38	26	5	7	85	40	+45	83	Qualification for promotion play-offs
3	Lentigione (Q)	38	26	5	7	75	42	+33	83	Qualification for promotion play-offs
4	Correggese (Q)	38	15	13	10	47	38	+9	58	Qualification for promotion play-offs
5	Athletic Carpi (Q)	38	15	13	10	59	52	+7	58	Qualification for promotion play-offs
6	Mezzolara	38	15	11	12	48	44	+4	56	
7	Prato	38	14	9	15	47	52	−5	51	
8	Forlì	38	14	8	16	46	47	−1	50	
9	Sammaurese	38	14	8	16	44	50	−6	50	
10	Aglianese	38	12	14	12	44	56	−12	50	
11	Alcione	38	13	9	16	52	49	+3	48	
12	Seravezza Pozzi	38	12	10	16	42	54	−12	46	
13	Fanfulla	38	13	6	19	44	49	−5	45	
14	Ghiviborgo	38	10	15	13	51	61	−10	45	
15	Real Forte Querceta	38	11	11	16	36	43	−7	44	
16	Bagnolese	38	9	11	18	26	39	−13	38	Qualification for relegation play-outs
17	Sasso Marconi (R)	38	10	7	21	37	61	−24	37	Qualification for relegation play-outs
18	Progresso (R)	38	6	18	14	36	48	−12	36	Relegation to Eccellenza
19	Borgo San Donnino (R)	38	7	15	16	34	52	−18	36	Relegation to Eccellenza
20	Tritium (R)	38	7	14	17	38	65	−27	35	Relegation to Eccellenza

Updated to match(es) played on 22 May 2022. Source: Soccerway (in English)
Rules for classification:
(C) Champions; (P) Promoted; (Q) Qualified for the phase indicated; (R) Relegated

== Group E ==
Pos	Team	Pld	W	D	L	GF	GA	GD	Pts	Promotion, qualification or relegation
1	San Donato Tavarnelle (C, P)	34	26	3	5	86	30	+56	81	Promotion to Serie C
2	Poggibonsi (Q)	34	23	5	6	61	28	+33	74	Qualification for promotion play-offs
3	Arezzo (Q)	34	18	10	6	65	45	+20	64	Qualification for promotion play-offs
4	Follonica Gavorrano (Q)	34	18	9	7	63	30	+33	63	Qualification for promotion play-offs
5	Pianese (Q)	34	16	8	10	58	42	+16	56	Qualification for promotion play-offs
6	Lornano Badesse	34	15	9	10	47	43	+4	54	
7	Trestina	34	13	10	11	48	43	+5	49	
8	Flaminia	34	13	7	14	49	50	−1	46	
9	Montespaccato	34	11	9	14	43	44	−1	42	
10	Cascina	34	11	9	14	39	40	−1	42	
11	Tiferno Lerchi	34	10	12	12	36	48	−12	42	
12	Sangiovannese	34	9	14	11	37	39	−2	41	
13	Scandicci	34	10	11	13	36	44	−8	41	
14	Rieti	34	9	8	17	39	58	−19	35	Qualification for relegation play-outs
15	Foligno (R)	34	9	8	17	46	65	−19	35	Qualification for relegation play-outs
16	UniPomezia (R)	34	8	7	19	38	64	−26	31	Relegation to Eccellenza
17	Cannara (R)	34	5	9	20	27	52	−25	24	Relegation to Eccellenza
18	Pro Livorno (R)	34	5	6	23	31	84	−53	21	Relegation to Eccellenza

Updated to match(es) played on 15 May 2022. Source: Soccerway (in English)
Rules for classification:
(C) Champions; (P) Promoted; (Q) Qualified for the phase indicated; (R) Relegated

== Group F ==
Pos	Team	Pld	W	D	L	GF	GA	GD	Pts	Promotion, qualification or relegation
1	Recanatese (C, P)	34	20	8	6	69	23	+46	68	Promotion to Serie C
2	Trastevere (Q)	34	17	8	9	54	33	+21	59	Qualification for promotion play-offs
3	Tolentino (Q)	34	16	8	10	42	30	+12	56	Qualification for promotion play-offs
4	Sambenedettese (Q)	34	15	10	9	41	36	+5	55	Qualification for promotion play-offs
5	Vastese (Q)	34	13	14	7	44	32	+12	53	Qualification for promotion play-offs
6	Pineto	34	13	13	8	43	29	+14	52	
7	Atletico Terme Fiuggi	34	15	6	13	41	45	−4	51	
8	San Nicolò Notaresco	34	14	7	13	45	41	+4	49	
9	Matese	34	13	10	11	44	41	+3	49	
10	Porto d'Ascoli	34	13	10	11	41	39	+2	49	
11	Montegiorgio	34	14	7	13	38	36	+2	49	
12	Chieti	34	12	13	9	38	38	0	49	
13	Fano	34	13	9	12	44	39	+5	48	Qualification for relegation play-outs
14	Vastogirardi	34	12	10	12	48	51	−3	46	Qualification for relegation play-outs
15	Castelnuovo Vomano (R)	34	11	11	12	49	51	−2	44	Qualification for relegation play-outs
16	Castelfidardo (R)	34	11	8	15	36	36	0	41	Qualification for relegation play-outs
17	Nereto (R)	34	2	6	26	23	80	−57	12	Relegation to Eccellenza
18	Aurora Alto Casertano (R)	34	1	4	29	21	81	−60	7	Relegation to Eccellenza

Updated to match(es) played on 22 May 2022. Source: Soccerway (in English)
Rules for classification:
(C) Champions; (P) Promoted; (Q) Qualified for the phase indicated; (R) Relegated

== Group G ==
Pos	Team	Pld	W	D	L	GF	GA	GD	Pts	Promotion, qualification or relegation
1	Giugliano (C, P)	34	24	3	7	63	24	+39	75	Promotion to Serie C
2	Torres (Q)	34	18	12	4	53	18	+35	66	Qualification for promotion play-offs
3	Team Nuova Florida (Q)	34	20	6	8	57	35	+22	66	Qualification for promotion play-offs
4	Arzachena (Q)	34	19	7	8	53	38	+15	64	Qualification for promotion play-offs
5	Afragolese (Q)	34	17	7	10	56	45	+11	58	Qualification for promotion play-offs
6	Cynthialbalonga	34	16	7	11	62	45	+17	55	
7	Aprilia	34	15	7	12	47	40	+7	52	
8	Ostia Mare	34	13	9	12	44	36	+8	48	
9	Muravera	34	14	5	15	54	60	−6	47	
10	Vis Artena	34	13	7	14	44	48	−4	46	
11	Gladiator	34	12	8	14	50	52	−2	44	
12	Real Monterotondo Scalo	34	11	6	17	48	59	−11	39	
13	Cassino	34	9	11	14	38	49	−11	38	
14	Atletico Uri	34	9	8	17	32	53	−21	35	Qualification for relegation play-outs
15	Carbonia (Note: 1 point deducted due to financial irregularities.) (R)	34	6	12	16	38	64	−26	29	Qualification for relegation play-outs
16	Insieme Formia (R)	34	7	8	19	33	64	−31	29	Qualification for relegation play-outs
17	Lanusei (R)	34	6	10	18	32	55	−23	28	Relegation to Eccellenza
18	Latte Dolce (R)	34	6	9	19	30	49	−19	27	Relegation to Eccellenza

Updated to match(es) played on 25 May 2022. Source: Soccerway (in English)
Rules for classification:
(C) Champions; (P) Promoted; (Q) Qualified for the phase indicated; (R) Relegated
Notes:

Semi-finals
Torres	2
Arzachena	1
Team Nuova Florida	3
Afragolese	5

Final
Torres	2
Afragolese	1

== Group H ==
Pos	Team	Pld	W	D	L	GF	GA	GD	Pts	Promotion, qualification or relegation
1	Audace Cerignola (C, P)	38	26	10	2	83	27	+56	88	Promotion to Serie C
2	Francavilla (Q)	38	22	5	11	62	44	+18	71	Qualification for promotion play-offs
3	Bitonto (Q)	38	19	8	11	56	40	+16	65	Qualification for promotion play-offs
4	Fasano (Q)	38	18	8	12	63	50	+13	62	Qualification for promotion play-offs
5	Nocerina (Q)	38	17	7	14	55	48	+7	58	Qualification for promotion play-offs
6	Gravina	38	16	8	14	51	49	+2	56	
7	Casertana	38	15	10	13	56	52	+4	55	
8	Sorrento	38	14	10	14	41	50	−9	52	
9	Nola	38	14	9	15	50	58	−8	51	
10	Brindisi	38	14	7	17	42	55	−13	49	
11	Molfetta	38	11	15	12	48	45	+3	48	
12	Team Altamura	38	12	11	15	48	45	+3	47	
13	Mariglianese	38	13	8	17	43	46	−3	47	
14	Casarano	38	12	11	15	37	49	−12	47	
15	Lavello	38	12	9	17	49	56	−7	45	Qualification for relegation play-outs
16	Nardò	38	12	9	17	59	67	−8	45	Qualification for relegation play-outs
17	Rotonda (Note: 8 points deducted for matchfixing.) (R)	38	14	8	16	39	46	−7	42	Qualification for relegation play-outs
18	San Giorgio (R)	38	9	14	15	30	44	−14	41	Qualification for relegation play-outs
19	Bisceglie (R)	38	8	15	15	32	47	−15	39	Relegation to Eccellenza
20	Virtus Matino (R)	38	8	6	24	36	62	−26	30	Relegation to Eccellenza

Updated to match(es) played on 22 May 2022. Source: Soccerway (in English)
Rules for classification:
(C) Champions; (P) Promoted; (Q) Qualified for the phase indicated; (R) Relegated

== Group I ==
Pos	Team	Pld	W	D	L	GF	GA	GD	Pts	Promotion, qualification or relegation
1	Gelbison (C, P)	36	23	9	4	63	23	+40	78	Promotion to Serie C
2	Cavese (Q)	36	23	8	5	58	21	+37	77	Qualification for promotion play-offs
3	Acireale (Q)	36	19	12	5	58	31	+27	69	Qualification for promotion play-offs
4	Lamezia Terme (Q)	36	20	9	7	58	35	+23	69	Qualification for promotion play-offs
5	Città di Sant'Agata (Q)	36	16	12	8	47	31	+16	60	Qualification for promotion play-offs
6	Paternò	36	14	10	12	45	41	+4	52	
7	Cittanova	36	16	4	16	48	56	−8	52	
8	Santa Maria Cilento	36	14	9	13	58	50	+8	51	
9	Licata	36	13	11	12	57	45	+12	50	
10	Real Agro Aversa	36	13	10	13	36	34	+2	49	
11	Portici	36	12	8	16	42	44	−2	44	
12	Trapani	36	9	14	13	44	47	−3	41	
13	San Luca	36	9	14	13	45	52	−7	41	
14	Sancataldese	36	11	7	18	34	60	−26	40	
15	Giarre	36	9	12	15	33	42	−9	39	
16	Castrovillari	36	9	11	16	39	48	−9	38	Qualification for relegation play-outs
17	Rende (R)	36	9	9	18	35	50	−15	36	Qualification for relegation play-outs
18	Troina (Note: 6 points deducted for matchfixing.) (R)	36	9	8	19	39	71	−32	29	Relegation to Eccellenza
19	Biancavilla (R)	36	3	5	28	25	83	−58	14	Relegation to Eccellenza
20	FC Messina (Note: Excluded due to failing to show up for two league games during the season.) (D, R)	0	0	0	0	0	0	0	0	Excluded

Updated to match(es) played on 22 May 2022. Source: Soccerway (in English)
Rules for classification:
(C) Champions; (D) Disqualified; (P) Promoted; (Q) Qualified for the phase indicated; (R) Relegated

== Poule Scudetto ==
=== Group 1 ===
Pos	Team	Pld	W	D	L	GF	GA	GD	Pts
1	Sangiuliano City Nova	2	2	0	0	4	0	+4	6
2	Novara (Note: Novara qualified for final stage as best 2nd-placed team.)	2	1	0	1	1	1	0	3
3	Arzignano	2	0	0	2	0	4	−4	0

Source: Soccerway (in English)
Notes:

Team 1	Score	Team 2
Sangiuliano City Nova	3–0	Arzignano
Arzignano	0–1	Novara
Novara	0–1	Sangiuliano City Nova

=== Group 2 ===
Pos	Team	Pld	W	D	L	GF	GA	GD	Pts
1	Recanatese	2	1	1	0	4	3	+1	4
2	Rimini	2	0	2	0	3	3	0	2
3	San Donato Tavarnelle	2	0	1	1	2	3	−1	1

Source: Soccerway (in English)

Team 1	Score	Team 2
Recanatese	2–1	San Donato Tavarnelle
San Donato Tavarnelle	1–1	Rimini
Rimini	2–2	Recanatese

=== Group 3 ===
Pos	Team	Pld	W	D	L	GF	GA	GD	Pts
1	Giugliano	2	2	0	0	4	1	+3	6
2	Audace Cerignola	2	1	0	1	2	3	−1	3
3	Gelbison	2	0	0	2	0	2	−2	0

Source: Soccerway (in English)

Team 1	Score	Team 2
Giugliano	3–1	Audace Cerignola
Audace Cerignola	1–0	Gelbison
Gelbison	0–1	Giugliano

=== Final stage ===
Semi-finals
Novara	0
Recanatese	1
Sangiuliano City Nova	1
Giugliano	2

Final
Recanatese (p)	1 (2)
Giugliano	1 (1)
