= Marvin Maietti =

Italian footballer

Personal information
- Date of birth: 2 February 1993 (age 33)
- Place of birth: Crema, Italy
- Height: 1.83 m (6 ft 0 in)
- Position: Midfielder

Team information
- Current team: Scanzorosciate

Youth career
- –2011: A.C. Milan
- 2011–2012: AlbinoLeffe

Senior career*
Years	Team	Apps	(Gls)
2012–2015	AlbinoLeffe	86	(1)
2015–2016	Pro Piacenza	30	(0)
2016–2017	Pergolettese	23	(0)
2017–	Scanzorosciate	11	(0)
- * Club domestic league appearances and goals

Marvin Maietti (born 2 February 1993) is an Italian footballer who plays as a midfielder for Italian Serie D club Scanzorosciate.

== Club career ==
Born in Crema, Lombardy region, Maietti started his career at Lombard club A.C. Milan. In 2011, he was signed by another Lombard club AlbinoLeffe along with Simone Pontiggia and Matteo Doni. Maietti was a player in the reserve team in 2011–12 season, which the first team relegated from Serie B in 2012.

The club failed to win the promotion playoffs in 2014. In the playoffs Cremonese won the game by penalty shootout in 6–5. Maietti did not take part in the shootout as the 10th assigned player.
