= Alessandro De Respinis =

Italian footballer (born 1993)

Personal information
- Date of birth: 13 July 1993 (age 33)
- Place of birth: Magenta, Italy
- Height: 1.84 m (6 ft 0 in)
- Position: Forward

Team information
- Current team: Trevigliese

Youth career
- –2011: AC Milan
- 2011–2012: Novara

Senior career*
| Years | Team | Apps | (Gls) |
| 2012–2016 | Mantova | 42 | (8) |
| 2014–2016 | → Santarcangelo (loan) | 31 | (6) |
| 2016–2017 | Siracusa | 11 | (1) |
| 2017–2018 | Lumezzane | 32 | (9) |
| 2018–2020 | Sondrio | 50 | (24) |
| 2020–2021 | Pro Sesto | 16 | (4) |
| 2021 | Piacenza | 21 | (3) |
| 2021–2022 | Vis Pesaro | 33 | (4) |
| 2022–2023 | Sangiuliano | 9 | (0) |
| 2023 | Catania | 9 | (1) |
| 2023–2024 | Treviso | 32 | (6) |
| 2024–2025 | Pro Sesto | 28 | (5) |
| 2025 | Pro Palazzolo | 12 | (0) |
| 2025– | Trevigliese | 12 | (2) |
- * Club domestic league appearances and goals as of 1 March 2026

Alessandro De Respinis (born 13 July 1993) is an Italian professional footballer who plays as a forward for Serie D club Trevigliese.

== Career ==
Born in Magenta, De Respinis started his career in AC Milan and Novara youth sector. As a senior, in August 2012 he joined to Mantova. After two seasons in Lega Pro Seconda Divisione for Montova, he was loaned to Serie C club Santarcangelo for two years.

In 2018, he joined to Serie D club Sondrio. He played two seasons for Sondrio.

=== Return to Serie C ===
For the 2020–21 Serie C season, he played for Pro Sesto and Piacenza.

On 10 July 2021, he signed with Vis Pesaro. On 7 July 2022, De Respinis signed with Sangiuliano, newly promoted to Serie C.

=== Back to Serie D ===
On 17 January 2023, De Respinis moved to Catania.

On 3 August 2023 he moved to Treviso.
