= Matías Masiero =

Uruguayan footballer (born 1988)

Personal information
- Full name: Matías Nicolás Masiero Balas
- Date of birth: January 15, 1988 (age 38)
- Place of birth: Montevideo, Uruguay
- Height: 1.77 m (5 ft 10 in)
- Position: Attacking midfielder

Youth career
- Central Español

Senior career*
Years	Team	Apps	(Gls)
2006–2007	Central Español	37	(7)
2008–2009	Genoa	2	(0)
2008	→ Pisa (loan)	6	(0)
2009	→ Bella Vista (loan)	15	(2)
2009–2013	Unión Española	8	(0)
2011	→ Hangzhou Greentown (loan)	2	(0)
2012	Unión Española B	10	(0)
2012	→ Unión La Calera (loan)	3	(0)
2013	Unión Española B	21	(5)
2013	El Tanque Sisley	0	(0)
2014–2015	Cerro	9	(0)
2015	Cerro Largo	2	(0)
2015–2016	El Tanque Sisley	2	(0)
2016–2018	Deportivo Maldonado	25	(3)
2019	Villa Teresa	13	(1)
- * Club domestic league appearances and goals

Matías Nicolás Masiero Balas (Spanish pronunciation: [maˈti.as maˈsjeɾo]; born 15 January 1988, in Montevideo) is an Uruguayan former footballer who played as an attacking midfielder.

== Club careers ==
In 2006, he began his career at first division club Central Español. He following year he was sold to Italian club Genoa but shortly after he was loaned to play in Serie B with Pisa. In 2009, he returned to Uruguay and joined C.A. Bella Vista.

Masiero moved to Chinese Super League side Hangzhou Greentown on a one-year loan deal from Unión Española in January 2011.

His last club was Villa Teresa in 2019.
