= Mirko Barbagli =

Italian football defender

Personal information
- Date of birth: 29 December 1982 (age 43)
- Place of birth: Arezzo, Italy
- Height: 1.77 m (5 ft 10 in)
- Position: Defender

Team information
- Current team: UC Sinalunghese

Senior career*
Years	Team	Apps	(Gls)
2002–2007	Arezzo	100	(0)
2007–2008	Grosseto	6	(0)
2008–2009	Perugia	24	(0)
2009–2010	Pro Patria	22	(0)
2010–2013	Alessandria	41	(1)
2012	→ Foligno (loan)	12	(1)
2013–2014	Forlì	14	(0)
2014–2015	Rimini		
2016–	UC Sinalunghese		
- * Club domestic league appearances and goals

Mirko Barbagli (born 29 December 1982) is an Italian football defender who currently plays for UC Sinalunghese.

== Career ==
Since his debut in 2002, Barbagli has obtained 57 caps in Serie B with Arezzo and 6 with Grosseto.
