= Manuel Personè =

Italian footballer

Manuel Perso
Personal information
- Date of birth: 17 May 1992 (age 34)
- Place of birth: Milan, Italy
- Height: 1.86 m (6 ft 1 in)
- Position: Forward

Team information
- Current team: Tritium

Youth career
- Pro Sesto
- 2010–2011: Albinoleffe

Senior career*
Years	Team	Apps	(Gls)
2009–2010	Pro Sesto	2	(0)
2010–2014	Albinoleffe	15	(0)
2011–2012	→ Cuneo (loan)	15	(3)
2013	→ Giacomense (loan)	9	(3)
2013–2014	→ SPAL (loan)	24	(4)
2015	Aversa Normanna	9	(0)
2015–2016	Forlì	35	(11)
2016	Virtus Castelfranco	11	(0)
2016–2017	Abano	16	(2)
2017–2018	Derthona	37	(10)
2018–2019	Caravaggio	32	(7)
2019–	Tritium	0	(0)
- * Club domestic league appearances and goals as of 14:50, 10 August 2019 (UTC)

Manuel Personè (born 17 May 1992 in Milan) is an Italian forward who plays for Tritium Calcio 1908.

== Career ==
In June 2019, Personé joined Tritium Calcio 1908.

== Apps on Italian Series ==
Coppa Italia : 2 app

Total : 2 app
