= Francesco Ferrini =

Italian footballer

Personal information
- Date of birth: 29 January 1985 (age 41)
- Place of birth: Ravenna, Italy
- Height: 1.79 m (5 ft 10 1/2 in)
- Position: Midfielder

Team information
- Current team: Civitanovese

Senior career*
| Years | Team | Apps | (Gls) |
| 2004–2007 | Cesena | 18 | (0) |
| 2004–2005 | → Forlì (loan) | 21 | (0) |
| 2007 | → Perugia (loan) | 8 | (0) |
| 2007–2009 | Sambenedettese | 44 | (3) |
| 2009–2011 | Pavia | 58 | (3) |
| 2011–2012 | Spezia | 14 | (0) |
| 2012–2013 | Pavia | 24 | (0) |
| 2013–2014 | Alessandria | 11 | (0) |
| 2014 | → Forlì (loan) | 13 | (1) |
| 2014– | Civitanovese | 0 | (0) |
- * Club domestic league appearances and goals

Francesco Ferrini (born 29 January 1985) is an Italian footballer who plays for Civitanovese.

== Biography ==
Born in Classe, a neighbourhood of Ravenna, Romagna region, Ferrini started his professional career at Forlì. In 2005, he returned to Cesena, where he spent 1 1/2 Serie B seasons.

In January 2007 he was signed by Perugia. in summer 2007 he left for Sambenedettese. Soon after the co-ownership deal with Cesena was resolved in June 2009, in summer 2009 he left for Pavia.

In 2011, he was signed by Spezia in 2-year contract. On 7 August 2012 he returned to Pavia. In 2013, he was signed by Alessandria. In January 2014 he was swapped with Massimiliano Sampaolesi. Ferrini returned to Alessandria on 1 July 2014. However, he was released on 28 August 2014.

On 30 August 2014 he was signed by Serie D club Civitanovese.
