= Marco Tattini =

Italian footballer

Personal information
- Date of birth: 22 November 1990 (age 35)
- Place of birth: Imola, Italy
- Height: 1.75 m (5 ft 9 in)
- Position: Midfielder

Team information
- Current team: Clodiense

Youth career
- –2007: Imolese
- 2007–2010: Cesena

Senior career*
Years	Team	Apps	(Gls)
2009–2011	Cesena	4	(0)
2010–2011	→ Pavia (loan)	24	(1)
2011–2012	Foligno	23	(0)
2012–2013	Cesena	0	(0)
2012–2013	→ Bellaria (loan)	29	(2)
2013–2018	Imolese	112	(17)
2018–	Clodiense		

International career
2007	Italy U18 Amateur		
2009–2011	Italy U20	7	(0)
2010	Italy U21	1	(0)
- * Club domestic league appearances and goals as of 21 October 2018

Marco Tattini (born 22 November 1990) is an Italian footballer who plays as a midfielder for Serie D club Clodiense.

== Career ==
Born in Imola, The Province of Bologna, Emilia (Emilia–Romagna) region, Tattini started his career at hometown club Imolese. He was the member of Allievi U17 team in 2005–06 season. He was selected to Italy U18 amateur in 2006–07 season. Tattini left for Romagna team Cesena on free transfer. Tattini played in the reserve from 2007–08 season to 2009–10 season, with 2008–09 season in Berretti and the rest in Primavera, due to Cesena relegated from Serie B in 2008 and promoted back to the league in 2009.

Tattini made his first team debut in the last round of 2008–09 Lega Pro Prima Divisione. Tattini played 3 times in 2009–10 Serie B. In July 2010 Tattini graduated from the youth system and left for third division club Pavia along with Nebil Caidi. Cesena also promoted to Serie A in 2010. Tattini played 24 games and missed a few due to international duty. Among the 24 appearances, half of them Tattini was including in the starting XI.

In June 2011 Tattini was sold to Foligno in co-ownership deal for peppercorn (€500) while N.Caidi moved to Pavia also in co-ownership. That month Cesena also recalled youth product Andrea Rossini from Foligno, made Cesena paid €149,500 cash and Tattini for the return. Tattini made 12 starts and 11 sub appearances in 2011–12 Lega Pro Prima Divisione. In June 2012 Cesena bought back Tattini, after the relegation of both Cesena and Foligno (from first and third division respectively).

For the 2018–19 season, his club Imolese was promoted to the third-tier Serie C after five seasons in the fourth, but he was unable to get any playing time on that level, and on 21 November 2018, he moved back to Serie D, signing with Clodiense.
