= Tommaso Ghinassi =

Italian footballer (born 1987)

Personal information
- Date of birth: 2 June 1987 (age 39)
- Place of birth: Fiesole, Italy
- Height: 1.87 m (6 ft 2 in)
- Position: Defender

Team information
- Current team: San Donato

Youth career
- Fiorentina
- Sangiovannese

Senior career*
Years	Team	Apps	(Gls)
2006–2009	Pistoiese	39	(0)
2007–2008	→ Genoa (loan)	1	(0)
2009–2010	Figline	20	(0)
2010–2012	Alessandria	17	(0)
2012	→ Prato (loan)	8	(1)
2012–2014	Prato	53	(1)
2014–2015	Pordenone	16	(0)
2015–2016	Prato	33	(0)
2016–2017	Siena	16	(1)
2017–2018	Racing Fondi	29	(2)
2018	Delta Rovigo	8	(0)
2019–	San Donato	3	(0)
- * Club domestic league appearances and goals as of 00:02, 5 June 2019 (UTC)

Tommaso Ghinassi (born 2 June 1987) is an Italian former footballer who played as a defender for San Donato.

== Biography ==
Ghinassi was signed by Prato in a temporary deal in January 2012. He was re-signed by Prato on 25 August 2012.

On 7 July 2014 Ghinassi was signed by Pordenone in a 1+1 year contract. The club was relegated at the end of season.

On 14 July 2015 Ghinassi returned to Prato again on a free transfer.

On 27 July 2016 Ghinassi was signed by Siena.
