= Mirco Spighi =

Italian footballer

Personal information
- Date of birth: 27 August 1990 (age 36)
- Place of birth: Forlimpopoli, Italy
- Height: 1.72 m (5 ft 8 in)
- Position: Midfielder

Team information
- Current team: Savignanese Calcio
- Number: 27

Senior career*
Years	Team	Apps	(Gls)
2010–2011	Forlì	34	(3)
2011–2013	Rimini	61	(3)
2013–2015	Alessandria	63	(4)
2015–2017	SPAL	28	(2)
2017–2019	Teramo	43	(2)
2017–2018	→ Catanzaro (loan)	28	(2)
2019–	Savignanese Calcio	11	(2)
- * Club domestic league appearances and goals as of 16:03, 19 March 2020 (UTC)

Mirco Spighi (born 27 August 1990) is an Italian football player who plays for Serie D club Savignanese Calcio.

== Club career ==
He made his Serie C debut for Alessandria on 30 August 2014 in a game against Mantova.
