= Gian Maria Rossi =

Italian footballer

Personal information
- Date of birth: 19 November 1986 (age 39)
- Place of birth: Ravenna, Italy
- Height: 1.80 m (5 ft 11 in)
- Position: Goalkeeper

Youth career
- Ravenna

Senior career*
Years	Team	Apps	(Gls)
2005–2011	Ravenna	56	(0)
2006	→ Fano (loan)	0	(0)
2012–2013	Andria	40	(0)
2013–2017	Bassano	111	(0)
2017–2023	Imolese	128	(0)
2023–2024	Ravenna	1	(0)
- * Club domestic league appearances and goals

Gian Maria Rossi (born 19 November 1986) is an Italian former professional footballer who played as a goalkeeper.

== Club career ==
Born in Ravenna, Rossi started his career in local club Ravenna. He made his professional debut in the 2006–07 Serie C1 season; that year Ravenna won promotion to Serie B as champions. The player made his Serie B debut on 9 February 2008 against Bologna. Rossi left the club at the end of 2011–2012 season.

Between 2012 and 2013, he played two seasons for Fidelis Andria in Serie C1.

In 2013 he joined Serie C2 club Bassano. He played four seasons for the club, three in Serie C.

On 11 November 2017, he moved to Imolese, on Serie D. Rossi extended his contract with the club in April 2019. On 12 September 2021, against Cesena, he played his 100th match for the club. He was named captain of the team.

== Honours ==
=== Club ===
Ravenna

- Serie C1: 2006–07 (C1/B)

Bassano Virtus

- Lega Pro Seconda Divisione: 2013–14 (Girone A)
