= Vincenzo Cammaroto =

Italian football Defender

Personal information
- Date of birth: 4 January 1983 (age 43)
- Place of birth: Santa Margherita Ligure, Italy
- Height: 1.72 m (5 ft 8 in)
- Position: Defender

Senior career*
Years	Team	Apps	(Gls)
2002–2003	Verbania	21	(0)
2003–2007	Vado	115	(4)
2007–2014	Alessandria	208	(4)
2014–2015	Delta Rovigo	13	(1)
2015	San Marino	18	(0)
2015–2016	RapalloBogliasco	25	(7)
2016–2017	Forlì	28	(0)
2017	Savona	10	(0)
2017–2018	Sestri Levante	14	(0)

Managerial career
- 2021: Sestri Levante
- * Club domestic league appearances and goals

Vincenzo Cammaroto (born 1 April 1983) is an Italian football coach and a former defender.

== Appearances on Italian Series ==
Serie C1 : 28 apps, 1 goal

Serie D : 190 apps, 4 goals

Total : 218 apps, 5 goals
