= Danilo Sacramento =

Brazilian footballer (born 1982)

Personal information
- Full name: Danilo Valério Sacramento
- Date of birth: November 3, 1982 (age 44)
- Place of birth: Araras, Brazil
- Height: 1.80 m (5 ft 11 in)
- Position: Midfielder

Youth career
- União São João

Senior career*
Years	Team	Apps	(Gls)
2000–2001	União São João	25	(8)
2001–2002	Monterrey	20	(2)
2002	Cruzeiro	15	(1)
2002–2003	Vasco da Gama	46	(5)
2003	Portuguesa	15	(0)
2004–2007	Ponte Preta	107	(11)
2007–2008	Genoa	22	(1)
2008–2010	Celta Vigo	26	(1)
2011	Red Bull Brasil		
2011	Grêmio Barueri	11	(0)
2012	Guarani	32	(4)
2013	XV de Piracicaba	0	(0)
2013	Bragantino	3	(0)
2013	CRB	11	(1)
2014	XV de Piracicaba	8	(1)
2015	Ferroviária	16	(1)
2016	Taubaté	17	(2)
2017	Barretos	5	(0)
2017	Ferroviária	17	(0)
- * Club domestic league appearances and goals as of 13 March 2018

Danilo Valério Sacramento (born 3 November 1982) is a retired Brazilian football midfielder. Danilo previously played for Ponte Preta and Vasco da Gama in the Campeonato Brasileiro.
