= Mirko Bruccini =

Italian footballer

Personal information
- Date of birth: 18 January 1986 (age 40)
- Place of birth: La Spezia, Italy
- Height: 1.83 m (6 ft 0 in)
- Position: Midfielder

Team information
- Current team: USD Fezzanese

Youth career
- –2005: Spezia

Senior career*
Years	Team	Apps	(Gls)
2005–2007	Spezia	12	(0)
2007–2008	Castelnuovo	33	(4)
2008–2014	Pro Patria	153	(15)
2014	Cremonese	12	(0)
2014–2016	Reggiana	58	(9)
2016–2017	Lucchese	40	(6)
2017–2021	Cosenza	107	(18)
2021–2022	Alessandria	23	(1)
2022	Mantova	14	(0)
2022–2023	Franciacorta	28	(3)
2023–	USD Fezzanese	4	(0)
- * Club domestic league appearances and goals as of 24 September 2023

Mirko Bruccini (born 18 January 1986) is an Italian footballer who plays for Serie D club USD Fezzanese.

== Biography ==
Born in La Spezia, Liguria region, Bruccini started his career at hometown club Spezia. In August 2007 he was signed by Castelnuovo of Serie C2. In summer 2008 he left for Pro Patria. He remained with the club even the club was in financial trouble in 2009, which he spent almost 5 more seasons for the Lombard club.

On 3 January 2014 he was signed by Cremonese.

On 21 July 2014 Bruccini was signed by Reggiana.

On 7 January 2021 he moved to Alessandria.

On 31 January 2022, Bruccini signed with Mantova.

On 19 August 2022, he joined Serie D club Franciacorta.
