= ASD Cascina =

Italian association football club

Cascina
- Full name: Associazione Sportiva Dilettantistica Cascina
- Founded: 1924
- Dissolved: 2022
- Ground: Stadio Simone Rendini, Cascina, Italy
- Capacity: 3,000
- 2021–22: Serie D/E, 10th
Home colours	Away colours

Associazione Sportiva Dilettantistica Cascina is an Italian association football club located in Cascina, Tuscany.

== History ==
The club was founded in 1924 as Associazione Sportiva Dilettantistica Cascina Calcio.

It has played in Serie D in the 1998–99 season and from 2001–02 to 2007–08 season.

In the summer of 2013, Cascina was merged with Valdera Calcio Associazione Sportiva Dilettantistica and was renamed as Cascina Valdera. The club was excluded in 2016 and refounded as A.S.D. Cascina, starting from Promozione. They were promoted subsequently to Eccellenza in 2019, and back to Serie D in 2021. In the 2021–22 Serie D season, Cascina escaped relegation thanks to good performances in the second half of the season.

In the summer of 2022, following the end of that season, the team relocated its license and headquarters to Ponsacco. The football entity was subsequently renamed ASD Mobilieri Ponsacco, meaning the ASD Cascina name officially stopped competing in Serie D from then on.

== Colors and badge ==
Its colors are black and blue.
