= Anthony Taugourdeau =

French footballer (born 1989)

Personal information
- Full name: Anthony Michel Taugourdeau
- Date of birth: 3 June 1989 (age 37)
- Place of birth: Marseille, France
- Height: 1.82 m (6 ft 0 in)
- Position: Defensive midfielder

Team information
- Current team: Piacenza

Youth career
- Pisa

Senior career*
Years	Team	Apps	(Gls)
2008–2009	Pisa	1	(0)
2009–2010	Carpi	32	(9)
2010–2015	AlbinoLeffe	63	(4)
2011	→ Prato (loan)	9	(1)
2015	Santarcangelo	18	(0)
2016–2017	Piacenza	39	(11)
2017–2020	Trapani	73	(14)
2018	→ Piacenza (loan)	11	(2)
2020–2021	Venezia	31	(0)
2021–2022	Vicenza	8	(1)
2022–2023	Turris	12	(0)
2023–2025	Lumezzane	55	(7)
2025–	Piacenza	0	(0)
- * Club domestic league appearances and goals as of 25 April 2025

Anthony Michel Taugourdeau (born 3 June 1989) is a French professional footballer who plays a defensive midfielder for Italian Serie D club Piacenza.

== Career ==
=== Pisa ===
Born in Marseille, France, Taugourdeau started his professional career in Italy, for Pisa Calcio. He made his Serie B debut on 1 November 2008, against Bari (later the 2009 champion). He replaced Alessandro Birindelli in the 85th minute, with the team losing 0–1 and ended with the same score.

=== Carpi ===
After the team went bankrupt, he moved to Serie D side Carpi and scored 9 goals in the league and 1 in promotion playoffs, as regular season team second goalscorer behind Stefano Menchini (12 goals) and overall the 4th team highest goalscorer of the season behind Menchini (12+0 goals), Andrea Ferretti (6+5 goals. who only played half season) and Enrico Gherardi (7+4 goals). Carpi also entered the promotion playoffs and after 6 matches, Carpi finished as losing semi-finalists but were promoted due to numbers of team expelled from professional league due to financial difficulties.

=== AlbinoLeffe ===
Taugourdeau did not remain with the team, instead he was offered a contract from Serie B club AlbinoLeffe.

He was signed by A.C. Prato in a temporary deal in January 2011.

On 1 January 2015 Taugourdeau left AlbinoLeffe again for Santarcangelo Calcio.

=== Piacenza ===
On 3 August 2015 Taugourdeau was signed for Piacenza.

=== Trapani ===
In July 2017 he was signed by Trapani.

=== Piacenza again ===
In January 2018 he moved back to Piacenza on loan.

=== Trapani again ===
In July 2018 he moved back to Trapani from loan, and won the Serie C.

=== Venezia ===
On 27 August 2020 he signed a 3-year contract with Venezia.

=== Vicenza ===
On 31 August 2021 he moved to Vicenza on a two-year deal.

=== Turris ===
On 26 August 2022, Taugourdeau joined Serie C club Turris on a two-year contract.
