= Damián Lanza =

Ecuadorian footballer (born 1982)

Damián Enrique Lanza
Personal information
- Full name: Damián Enrique Lanza Moyano
- Date of birth: 10 April 1982 (age 44)
- Place of birth: Cuenca, Ecuador
- Height: 1.85 m (6 ft 1 in)
- Position: Goalkeeper

Senior career*
Years	Team	Apps	(Gls)
2004–2005	Deportivo Cuenca	34	(1)
2006	Aucas	17	(0)
2007	Arezzo	2	(0)
2007–2009	Genoa	0	(0)
2010	Olmedo	16	(0)
2011	Manta FC	29	(0)
2012–2018	Barcelona	24	(0)
2018	Clan Juvenil	0	(0)
Total		122	(1)

International career
2004–2006	Ecuador	5	(0)
- * Club domestic league appearances and goals

Damián Enrique Lanza Moyano (born April 10, 1982) is an Ecuadorian former footballer who played as a goalkeeper. Lanza was born in Cuenca and is half Argentinian, through his father.

== Career ==
Lanza began his career in Argentina in Buenos Aires, but failed to make an impact and returned to Ecuador where he has enjoyed more success with Deportivo Cuenca and Aucas. He was in the Ecuador national team for the 2006 FIFA World Cup in Germany. Lanza was considered a surprise selection for the national team by the coach Luis Fernando Suárez.

He successively moved to Europe during the 2006-2007 winter transfer season, joining Italian Serie B club Arezzo. On April 6, 2007, Lanza made his first start for Arezzo against Brescia. His second came the game after against Vicenza Calcio. He however failed to become a regular with the amaranto and was successively released for free following Arezzo's relegation to Serie C1.

On September 28, 2007, he joined the ranks of Genoa C.F.C. in a free transfer as third-choice goalkeeper. More recently, he was offered a trial at Polish side Wisła Kraków which failed to materialise into any sort of deal. In September, 2009 he joined Emelec as a third-choice goalkeeper.

== Honours ==
=== Club ===
Deportivo Cuenca

  - Serie A de Ecuador: 2004
