= Davide Corso =

Italian footballer (born 1992)

Personal information
- Date of birth: 29 April 1992 (age 34)
- Place of birth: Messina, Italy
- Height: 1.86 m (6 ft 1 in)
- Position: Midfielder

Team information
- Current team: Milazzo
- Number: 16

Youth career
- 2010–2011: Reggina

Senior career*
Years	Team	Apps	(Gls)
2011–2012	Catanzaro	12	(0)
2012–2013	Mantova	16	(1)
2013–2014	Novese	11	(0)
2014–2015	HinterReggio	32	(3)
2015–2016	Reggina	22	(0)
2016–2017	Palmese	32	(5)
2017	Taranto	14	(0)
2018	Olympia Agnonese	6	(0)
2018–2019	Matera	15	(0)
2019	Picerno	12	(0)
2019	Corigliano	4	(0)
2019–2020	Gelbison Cilento	1	(0)
2020–2022	Cittanova	49	(3)
2022	Locri	1	(0)
2023	Gioiese	2	(0)
2023–2024	Messana		
2024–	Milazzo	17	(1)
- * Club domestic league appearances and goals as of 25 January 2026

Davide Corso (born 29 April 1992) is an Italian footballer who plays as a midfielder for Serie D club Milazzo.

== Club career ==
=== Catanzaro ===
Corso played his first game for Catanzaro on 4 September 2011 in a 0–0 away draw against Melfi.

=== Matera ===
In August 2018, he joined Serie C club Matera.

=== Serie D ===
On 5 August 2019, he signed with Corigliano in Serie D. However, he left the club again after two months. On 11 December 2019, he then joined Gelbison Cilento. In July 2020, he moved to Cittanova. Two years later, in July 2022, he joined Locri.
