= Francesco Galeoto =

Italian footballer

Personal information
- Date of birth: 17 March 1972 (age 54)
- Place of birth: Palermo, Italy
- Height: 1.76 m (5 ft 9 in)
- Position: Defender

Team information
- Current team: Palermo Calcio Popolare (head coach)

Senior career*
| Years | Team | Apps | (Gls) |
| 1992–1993 | Palermo | 0 | (0) |
| 1993–1994 | Cerveteri | 28 | (1) |
| 1994–1995 | Trapani | 33 | (2) |
| 1995–1997 | Palermo | 67 | (0) |
| 1997–1998 | Salernitana | 34 | (0) |
| 1998–2001 | Pescara | 77 | (2) |
| 2001–2002 | Taranto | 27 | (0) |
| 2002–2006 | Treviso | 118 | (3) |
| 2006–2007 | Arezzo | 33 | (0) |
| 2007 | Genoa | 19 | (0) |
| 2007–2008 | Messina | 40 | (1) |
| 2008–2010 | Crotone | 58 | (0) |
| 2010–2011 | Barletta | 23 | (0) |
| 2011–2013 | Atletico Campofranco | 0 | (0) |

Managerial career
- 2018: Castelbuono
- 2019: Alcamo
- 2024–: Palermo Calcio Popolare
- * Club domestic league appearances and goals

Francesco Galeoto (born 17 March 1972) is an Italian football coach and former defender, currently in charge of Sicilian amateurs Palermo Calcio Popolare.

== Playing career ==
After spending his early years as a youth player for hometown club Palermo, he left for Cerveteri in 1993. Since then, he played for several Serie B and Serie C1 teams, including Trapani, Palermo (where he returned in 1995), Salernitana, Pescara and Taranto. In 2002, he signed for Treviso, playing there for four seasons, and making eleven appearances in the Italian Serie A during the first half of the 2005-06 season. In January 2006 he moved to Arezzo, and then to Genoa twelve months later, winning a personal second promotion to Serie A in the 2006-07 Serie B. In July 2007 he signed for Messina, and spent the 2007–08 season with the giallorossi.

He was released for free during the summer 2008 transfer window as a consequence of the disbandment of his club, and was signed by Lega Pro Prima Divisione's Crotone in August 2008.

In September 2010, he was signed by Barletta as free agent, after released by Crotone on 1 July.

In September 2011, a 38-year-old Galeoto decided to quit professional football and join Eccellenza amateurs Atletico Campofranco.

== Coaching career ==
After retiring, Galeoto briefly worked as the head coach of Sicilian amateurs Castelbuono in October 2018.

He successively served as the head coach of Eccellenza Sicily club Alcamo from August to October 2019.

In July 2024, Galeoto was appointed new head coach of Prima Categoria amateurs Palermo Calcio Popolare, a small fan-owned club devoted to promoting grassroots football in the city of Palermo.
