= Vincenzo Viviani (politician) =

Italian magistrate and politician

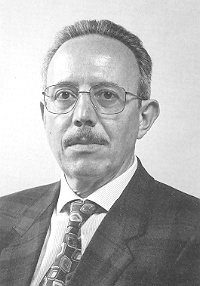

Member of the Chamber of Deputies
- In office March 1994 – March 1996

Personal details
- Born: 31 December 1938 (age 87) Rome, Kingdom of Italy
- Party: Democratic Party of the Left
- Education: University of Pisa
- Profession: Magistrate

Vincenzo Viviani (born 31 December 1938) is an Italian magistrate and politician who served as a Deputy from 1994 to 1996.
