= Roberto Menassi =

Italian footballer

Personal information
- Date of birth: January 21, 1981 (age 45)
- Place of birth: Sarnico, Italy
- Height: 1.75 m (5 ft 9 in)
- Position: Center midfielder

Youth career
- 1998–1999: Brescia

Senior career*
Years	Team	Apps	(Gls)
1999–2004	Montichiari	102	(1)
2004–2009	Monza	141	(4)
2009–2010	Perugia	20	(3)
2010–2013	Alessandria	31	(1)
- * Club domestic league appearances and goals

Roberto Menassi (born January 21, 1981) is an Italian former football midfielder.

== Caps in Italian Series ==
- Serie C1 : 119 Caps, 2 goal
- Serie C2 : 136 Caps, 3 goal
