= Porto Tolle =

- Comune
- Comune di Porto Tolle
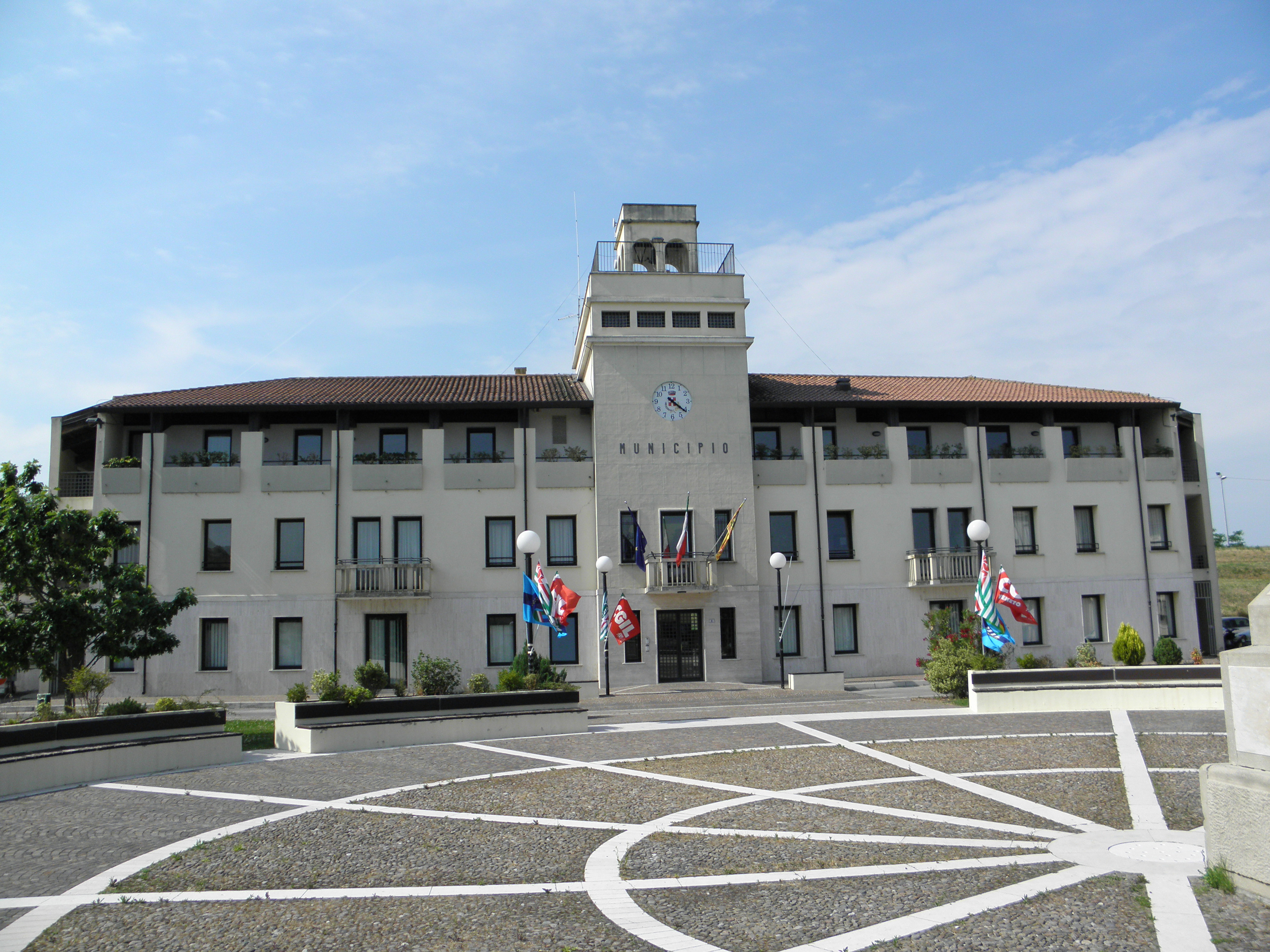
- Former Austrian barracks, now the town hall.

- Location within Italy Location within Veneto
- Coordinates: 44°57′N 12°19′E
- Country: Italy
- Region: Veneto
- Province: Rovigo (RO)
- Frazioni: Boccasette, Ca' Mello, Ca' Tiepolo (sede comunale), Ca' Venier, Ca' Zuliani, Donzella, Pila, Polesine Camerini, Santa Giulia, Scardovari, Tolle

Government
  - Mayor: Roberto Pizzoli

Area
  - Total: 256.88 km^{2} (99.18 sq mi)
- Elevation: 1 m (3.3 ft)

Population (31 December 2015)
  - Total: 9,826
  - Density: 38.25/km^{2} (99.07/sq mi)
- Demonym: Portotollesi
- Time zone: UTC+1 (CET)
  - Summer (DST): UTC+2 (CEST)
- Postal code: 45018
- Dialing code: 0426
- Website: Official website

Porto Tolle is a town in the province of Rovigo, Veneto, northern Italy.

== Twin towns ==
Porto Tolle is twinned with:

- Medulin, Croatia, since 2010
- Trecate, Italy, since 2010
