= Fausto Ferrari =

Italian footballer

Personal information
- Date of birth: 9 March 1980 (age 46)
- Place of birth: Pavullo nel Frignano, Italy
- Height: 1.86 m (6 ft 1 in)
- Position: Forward

Team information
- Current team: Cimone

Senior career*
Years	Team	Apps	(Gls)
1998–1999	Carpi	18	(0)
1999–2001	Bologna	0	(0)
2000	→ Pisa (loan)	11	(1)
2000–2001	→ Lucchese (loan)	3	(0)
2001	→ Montichiari (loan)	11	(0)
2001–2002	Sassuolo	19	(2)
2002–2003	Brescello	32	(10)
2003–2004	Ascoli	0	(0)
2003–2004	→ Rosetana (loan)	12	(0)
2004	→ Gubbio (loan)	15	(3)
2004–2005	Pavia	8	(0)
2005	→ San Marino (loan)	8	(0)
2005–2007	Valenzana	51	(11)
2007–2010	Montichiari	93	(69)
2010–2015	Lumezzane	70	(20)
2012–2013	→ Castiglione d.Stiviere (loan)	28	(16)
2013–2014	→ Alessandria (loan)	3	(2)
2015	Fiorenzuola	14	(2)
2015–2016	Ciliverghe	17	(4)
2016–2017	Orceana		
2017–2018	Montichiari		
2018–2021	Lama 80		
2021–	Cimone		
- * Club domestic league appearances and goals as of 8 May 2016

Fausto Ferrari (born 9 March 1980) is an Italian footballer who plays for an amateur club Cimone.

== Biography ==
Born in Pavullo nel Frignano, Emilia–Romagna, Ferrari started his professional career at Carpi, then moved to the regional capital side Bologna. He never appeared for Bologna in Serie A, and his only appearance for Bologna came in a UEFA Cup game against Zenit St. Petersburg in September 1999. In January 2000, he was loaned to Pisa, then spent 2000–01 season at Lucchese and Montichiari. In mid-2001, he moved to Sassuolo in co-ownership deal, which in June 2002, Bologna gave up the remain 50% registration rights to Sassuolo. However, he moved to Brescello and scored a career high of 10 league goals. In July 2003 he was signed by Serie B side Ascoli but loaned to Rosetana and Gubbio. He failed to score regularly and, in mid-2004, sold to Pavia in another co-ownership deal. At Pavia and San Marino Calcio, Ferrari did not score either, and Ascoli gave up the rights in June 2005.

He then moved to Valenzana and finally found his scoring shoes in the 2006–07 Serie C2 season. In the next season, he was re-signed by Montichiari, by then a Serie D team. He scored 22 league goals, and Montichiari finished as the losing semi-finalists of the promotion playoffs. However, as some teams in Lega Pro were expelled due to financial problems, Montichiari was promoted back to the professional league to fill the vacancy. He scored 21 goals in 2008–09 Lega Pro Seconda Divisione, however, he did not score in the relegation playoffs, and Montichiari was relegated. In 2009–10 Serie D he scored 26 goals and was promoted as Group C champion.

On 23 July 2010, he was signed by Prima Divisione club Lumezzane in 2-year contract., which he lasted played in that level in 2004–05. He scored 10 league goals as team top-scorer. On 27 June 2011, he added one more year to his current contract to 30 June 2013.

Ferrari left for Alessandria in another temporary deal on 3 July 2013.
