= Andrea Ferretti (footballer, born 1985) =

Italian footballer

Personal information
- Date of birth: 15 April 1985 (age 41)
- Place of birth: Pontedera
- Position: Forward

Team information
- Current team: Scandicci

Senior career*
Years	Team	Apps	(Gls)
2006–2007	Montemurlo		
2007–2008	Canavese	1	(0)
2008	Sestri Levante	13	(6)
2008–2009	Biellese	30	(17)
2009–2010	Carrarese	10	(2)
2010	Carpi	17	(6)
2010–2012	Treviso	68	(32)
2012–2013	Alessandria	24	(7)
2013–2014	Tuttocuoio	16	(4)
2014	Poggibonsi	15	(4)
2014	RapalloBogliasco	14	(2)
2014–2015	Matelica	10	(0)
2015–2016	Ponsacco	30	(15)
2016–2018	Real Forte	63	(24)
2018	Viareggio 2014	10	(1)
2018–	Scandicci	22	(7)
- * Club domestic league appearances and goals as of 23:24, 31 July 2019 (UTC)

Andrea Ferretti (born 15 April 1985) is an Italian footballer who plays for Scandicci.

Ferretti had a journeyman career and only able to play in Italian fourth level (Serie C2, lowest level of fully professional league) or below. However Ferretti had a high goal scoring record in Serie D with an average of 0.53 goal per game (as of 2014) and much lower efficiency in Serie C2. Since Serie C2 was vanished in 2014, Ferretti only able to join Serie D clubs.

== Biography ==
=== Between Serie C2 and D ===
Ferretti started his career at Serie D teams (Italian fifth division). Ferretti had played for Eccellenza Tuscany team Montemurlo in 2006–07 season (Italian sixth division).

In August 2007 he joined a professional team Canavese (Serie C2). However, he only played once and returned to Serie D in mid-season. He had a high goal scoring record in Serie D for Sestri Levante and Biellese (both from Serie D group A, Piedmont, Aosta Valley and Liguria region). He won the champion of Group A for Biellese and finished as the losing semi-finalists in the Scudetto Dilettanti playoffs. However Biellese withdrew from 2009–10 Lega Pro Seconda Divisione.

Despite the withdrew of Biellese, Ferretti did return to Italian fourth division again, for Carrarese (the division had also renamed to Lega Pro Seconda Divisione). Ferretti only scored twice for the Tuscany team in the first six months.

=== Carpi ===
In January 2010 Ferretti returned to Serie D again, for Carpi. Ferretti scored 6 goals in group stage and 5 more in playoffs. Despite losing in the promotion playoffs (as Carpi only able to finish as the second in group stage), Carpi promoted back to professional league to fill the vacancies. Ferretti was the team joint-second-top-scorer (league+playoffs) (along with Enrico Gherardi, 11 goals), just one goal behind Stefano Menchini (12 goals, who scored nil in playoffs) Ferretti was the top-scorer of the team in the playoffs with 5 goals (ahead Gherardi with 4). Ferretti's 6 goals record in the league group stage also made him ranked the team fourth-scorer in regular season, behind Menchini (12 goals), Anthony Taugourdeau (9 goals) and Gherardi (7 goals), however Ferretti only spent less than 6 months to score the goals.

=== Treviso ===
In mid-2010 he left for another Serie D team Treviso. The team finished as the champion of the Group C and promoted (group C consist part of Veneto and Friuli-Venezia Giulia). Treviso failed to become Serie D overall champion (Scudetto Dilettanti) as the team was in the same group with Cuneo (eventually the champion) and failed to qualify to the semi-finals as best second place team of the group stage of the playoffs. Ferretti scored a career high of 20 goals (in regular season) as team top-scorer, one goal ahead Massimo Perna (who scored more in penalty) .

Ferretti remained in Treviso for 2011–12 Lega Pro Seconda Divisione. Ferretti was the regular goalscorer of the team along with Perna.

== Honours ==
- Serie D (group stage): 2009 (Biellese), 2011 (Treviso)
