= Domenico Suriano =

Italian footballer (born 1988)

Personal information
- Date of birth: 30 May 1988 (age 38)
- Place of birth: Andria, Italy
- Height: 1.73 m (5 ft 8 in)
- Position: Forward

Team information
- Current team: U.S.D Corato Calcio

Senior career*
| Years | Team | Apps | (Gls) |
| 2004–2008 | Andria BAT | 2 | (0) |
| 2006–2007 | → Bitonto | 9 | (1) |
| 2008–2010 | Pro Vasto | 35 | (7) |
| 2010–2011 | Lecco | 5 | (0) |
| 2011 | → Giulianova | 10 | (2) |
| 2011–2012 | Fortis Trani | 12 | (3) |
| 2012–2013 | Milazzo | 24 | (3) |
| 2013–2014 | Pomigliano | 36 | (9) |
| 2014–2015 | Cavese | 17 | (5) |
| 2015 | Chieti | 11 | (1) |
| 2015–2016 | Bellaria Igea | 19 | (5) |
| 2016–2017 | Pomigliano | 29 | (10) |
| 2017–2018 | Mantova | 26 | (7) |
| 2018–2019 | Pomigliano | 22 | (1) |
| 2019– | Real Giulianova | 14 | (5) |
- * Club domestic league appearances and goals as of 13:09, 27 December 2019 (UTC)

Domenico Suriano (born 30 May 1988) is an Italian footballer who currently plays for Eccellenza Pugliese team U.S.D Corato Calcio.

== Biography ==
Born in Andria, Apulia, Southern Italy, Suriano started his career at hometown club Andria BAT. In summer 2006 he was loaned to Serie D club Bitonto. He scored his first goal in the 2006–07 season.

In 2008 Suriano left to join Pro Vasto, also in Serie D. In 2008–09 season his team gained promotion to Lega Pro Seconda Divisione. The following season he scored 6 goals in 22 appearances.

In the summer of 2010 he moved to Lecco, a Lega Pro Seconda Divisione team in Lombardy. In January 2011 he was loaned to Giulianova.

In December 2011 he left for Serie D team Fortis Trani. In that season he scored 3 goals in 12 appearances.

In November 2012 Suriano joined Lega Pro Seconda Divisione club Milazzo and, within a few months, became the team captain. At the end of the season Milazzo went out of business.

In October 2013 he joined Serie D team Pomigliano. In 2014, he won the Coppa Italia Serie D.

== Honours ==
=== Club ===
- Coppa Italia Serie D: 2013–14
