= Auro Roselli =

Italian resistant, journalist, photographer, writer and inventor

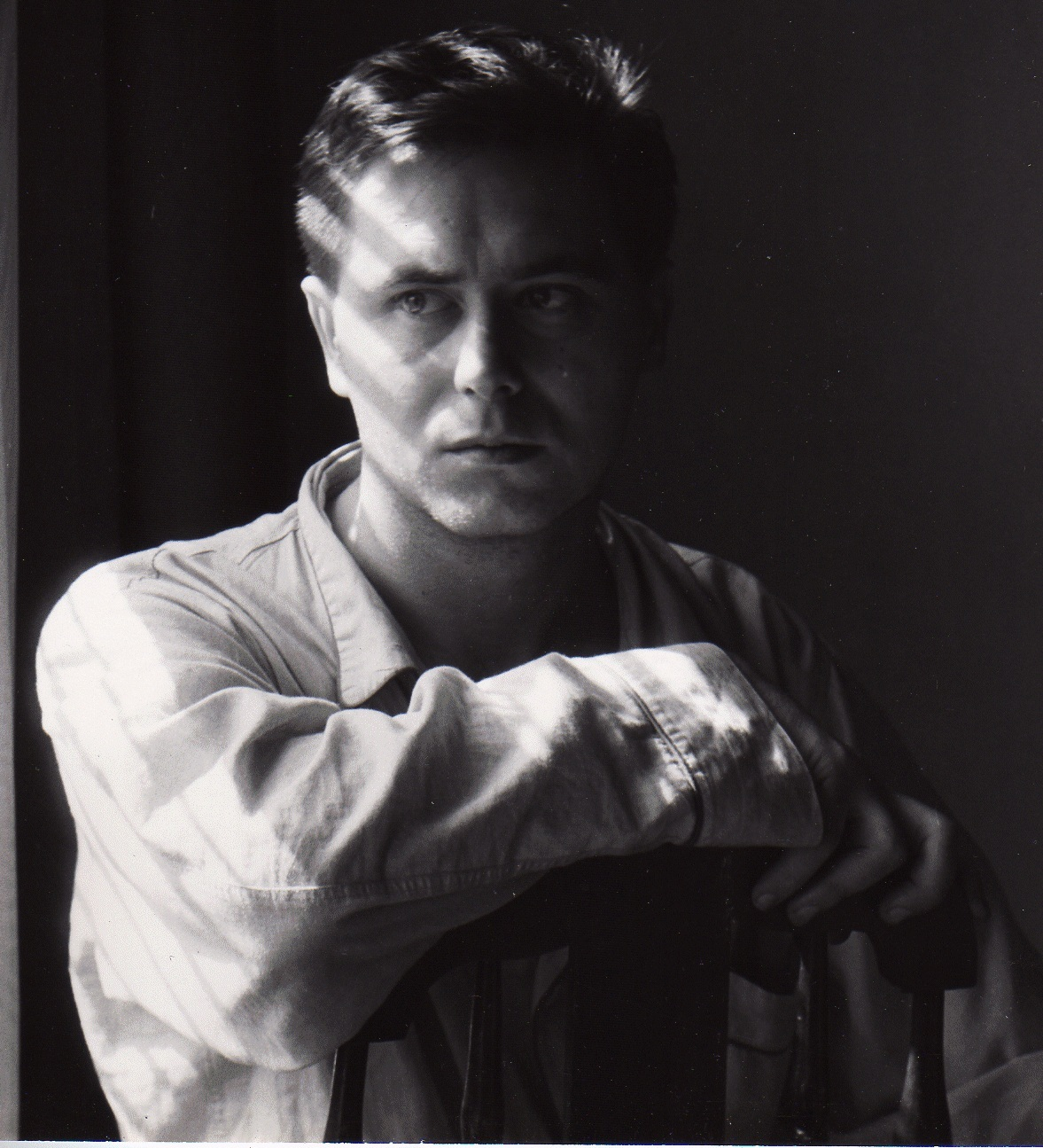
Auro Roselli, self-portrait, circa 1956

Auro Roselli (1921 in Pescara - May 12, 2013) was an Italian resistant, journalist, photographer, writer and inventor.

== Early resistance and the war years ==
Roselli grew up in a working-class district of Turin. His father, Gherardo Roselli, was a sculptor, and his mother was a homemaker. From his father and his teacher of Humanities, Gaudenzio Manfredi, he learned to question authority under Fascism. This landed him briefly in jail at age thirteen, his first political imprisonment.

Growing up, he became attracted to the English language, Anglo-American culture, and the international and liberal democratic vision they provided. A brief attendance at the University of Turin in the Faculty of Foreign Languages and Literatures was interrupted in 1940 by a military draft into the cadet officers' course of the Alpini troops. There he was arrested on suspicion of having conspired against Fascism with some other students arrested in Turin
Roselli was tried in the Tribunale Speciale per la Difesa dello Stato in Rome, and sentenced to two and a half years in the penitentiary of Forte Urbano, in the Emilia region. He was liberated after the fall of the Mussolini government, in the brief interregnum and political amnesty under General Badoglio. On September 8, 1943, the Italian army collapsed and Nazi forces occupied Italy.

Roselli first joined a monarchist partisan formation in the Lanzo valley, west of Turin. Later, he worked with the Comitato di Liberazione Nazionale, guiding escaped Allied prisoners to neutral Switzerland. Caught with a group of them at the railway station of Novara, he managed to escape, and eventually made his way to Switzerland and the refugee camp of Tramelan. Among his encounters, there was Piero Chiara, later renowned as a writer, who was recruiting students for the Office of Strategic Services (OSS), precursor of the CIA.

Escaping from the work camp, he returned to Italy. The first village he came to was in the mountains of Lake Como. There, under the nom de guerre of Gigi, he founded a partisan formation with some local young men and Lombard students who refused to collaborate with the Nazi Occupation. Their activities consisted of raiding Fascist controlled barracks and warehouses, gathering and distributing information, and guiding fugitives from the Nazis to Switzerland.

His new formation was part of the Garibaldi Brigades, under Communist control. In disagreement with his command on both political ideology and military strategy, Roselli resigned his command and returned to Switzerland. There he joined Giustizia e Libertà, a formation supported and armed by the OSS. Upon hearing the news that the Resistance had gained control of Milan, Roselli and his new partisan comrades immediately returned to Italy.

== Journalism ==
During his partisan activity on Lake Como, Roselli had befriended some Milanese refugees, who after the war introduced him to the writer Elio Vittorini. Under Vittorini's sponsorship, Roselli entered journalism. In 1949 he was given his dream job: correspondent from New York for the leading weekly journal l'Europeo, under the direction of Arrigo Benedetti. He remained in New York until his visa expired in 1951.

Roselli then transferred to Montreal, working as a political commentator for the International Service of the Canadian Broadcasting Corporation.

Roselli finally returned to New York when his wife, illustrator and designer Luciana Amelotti Roselli, secured a residents' visa for the couple. After a period of free-lancing for a range of leading Italian journals including Il Mondo, a Rome-based political and cultural weekly, L'Espresso, a Milanese weekly, and as a photographer for Epoca, an Italian version of Life magazine, Roselli was recommended by his erstwhile employer Benedetti to Gaetano Baldacci, director of the newly founded Milanese daily, Il Giorno.

=== Il Giorno ===
Roselli's career as a correspondent, photographer and editorialist at Il Giorno spanned over three decades from 1956 to 1989. Responsible for the coverage of every aspect of the United States, from politics to culture, science, technology and life-style, he was a defining voice in Italy for such major events as the Cape Canaveral launchings, the Kennedy and King assassinations, Watergate, the Iranian hostage crisis, and the Reagan and Clinton years.

His role models in journalism were the television newscaster David Brinkley, and the columnist Walter Lippmann. When Roselli met the latter at a party in the 1970s, they discussed the difficulty of giving truly novel news, as opposed to simply expected information. From the master, he learned the maxim: "You can only tell people real news if your readers know half of it already".

== Retirement and other activities ==
On his retirement from Il Giorno, Roselli moved to Southern California with his second wife, actress Elise Hunt, and became a US citizen in 1994. He continues to write fiction and non-fiction books, plays and stories, but his main interest has shifted to inventions in ecology and aviation. He earned a solo piloting license in 1970. He holds two patents on concepts in solar-powered flight and a design for a paraflier.

== Family life ==
Roselli was married to Luciana Amelotti Roselli, from Alessandria, Italy, from 1950 to their divorce in 1964. He has one daughter, Elisa, born in New York City in 1956. He married his second and current wife, Elise Hunt from Milton, Massachusetts, in 1969. His sister, Lucia Roselli (b. 1930) is also a writer

== Controversies and ideological positioning ==
Throughout his career, Roselli has been an advocate of Anglo-American style liberal democracy, although always aware of its defects and limitations. His war years left him with experience of authoritarian regimes of several political colours, and their methods and jargon. He kept aloof from the strongly left-wing doctrines of the Italian intelligentsia of the post-war period, identifying more with the youth, liberation and peace movements in the USA of the 60s and 70s. In the critical Presidential election of 1968, for example, he strongly supported the dovish Democratic candidate, Eugene McCarthy, who was the first politician to promote an end to US involvement in Vietnam.

== Publications ==
In addition to his daily articles for Il Giorno, Roselli has published a children's book, The Cats of the Eiffel Tower, with illustrations by Laurent de Brunhoff (NY: Delacorte, 1967). It was a story he made up for his little daughter Elisa on their long drives while holidaying in France.

His letters from prison during the war years form the core of a biographical work by his sister, Lucia Roselli: Mio Fratello Ando' in Galera (Edizioni L'Arciere Cuneo, 1990).

Roselli filmed a documentary about Italian Americans that was aired on RAI TV in 1961, and was the cinematographer for another documentary, Paese d'America (1959), on the same theme, made with film director Gian Luigi Polidoro, and shown at the Cannes festival.
