= Andrea Mazzuoli =

Italian footballer (born 1992)

Personal information
- Date of birth: 15 February 1992 (age 34)
- Place of birth: Siena, Italy
- Position: Defender

Team information
- Current team: Alessandria

Youth career
- Siena

Senior career*
Years	Team	Apps	(Gls)
2010–	Siena		
2012	Sambenedettese (loan)	3	(0)
2012–	Alessandria (loan)	3	(0)
- * Club domestic league appearances and goals as of 26 September 2012

Andrea Mazzuoli (Italian pronunciation: [anˈdrɛːa matˈtswɔːli] born 15 February 1992) is an Italian football defender who currently plays for Alessandria, on loan from Siena.

== Biography ==
=== Youth career ===
He played 30 matches with Siena youth team in Campionato Nazionale Primavera.

=== Senior career ===
He had his first senior experiences with Sambenedettese (Serie D) and Alessandria (Lega Pro Seconda Divisione).
