= Luca Fusco =

Italian footballer and manager

Personal information
- Date of birth: 31 August 1977 (age 49)
- Place of birth: Salerno, Italy
- Height: 1.82 m (5 ft 11 1/2 in)
- Position: Defender

Youth career
- 1995–1997: Salernitana

Senior career*
Years	Team	Apps	(Gls)
1996–2003	Salernitana	50	(2)
1996–1997	→ Cavese (loan)	28	(0)
2003–2005	Messina	49	(0)
2006–2007	Genoa	11	(0)
2006–2007	→ Crotone (loan)	32	(0)
2007–2010	Salernitana	82	(0)
2010–2013	Paganese	69	(1)

Managerial career
- 2017–2018: Pro Vercelli (assistant)
- 2018: Paganese
- 2019–2020: Juve Stabia (U19)
- 2020–2021: Sorrento
- 2021–2022: Paganese (assistant)
- * Club domestic league appearances and goals

Luca Fusco (born 31 August 1977) is an Italian professional football manager and former player.

Fusco played over 200 matches at Serie B and 31 at Serie A. He had spent over 7 season at native club Salernitana.

== Career ==
Started his career at Salernitana, he started to play for first team in January 1998 after a loan spell at Serie D club Cavese. He won the 2nd division champion with Salernitana at the end of season. His first taste of Italian top division started on 13 September 1998, the opening match that lost 1–3 to A.S. Roma. His journey at Serie A paused at 24 games, due to the relegation of the Campania team. He played for the club at Serie B until 2003, which he was signed by league rival Messina. He played 42 out of possible 46 league matches, and followed the team promoted to Serie A again, this time as 4th place. But before he joined Genoa of Serie C1 in January 2006, he just played 7 Serie A matches in the previous 1 1/2 Serie A seasons, partially due to injuries. After won the Serie B promotion with Geona, again, he was not in the plan of Genoa, which originally promoted Serie A in 2005 but suffered from its scandal. He was loaned to Crotone but faced relegation again.

In August 2007, Fusco re-joined Salernitana, which relegated to Serie C1 since 2005. Fusco regained his fit as a regular starter, won the promotion with club as champion in 2008, and avoided relegation by finished at 14th, just one point away from the relegated team.

He became a free agent after Salernitana relegated. On 2 November 2010 he joined Paganese.

== Coaching career ==
He was appointed head coach of Paganese in Serie C on 13 July 2018. He was fired by Paganese on 13 November 2018, with the team in the relegation zone.

== Honours ==
- Serie B Champion: 1998
- Serie C1 Champion: 2008
- Serie D Champion: 1997
- Serie C1 Promotion Playoffs Winner: 2006
