= Gianluca Segarelli =

Italian footballer

Personal information
- Date of birth: 23 February 1978 (age 48)
- Place of birth: Spoleto, Italy
- Height: 1.72 m (5 ft 7 1/2 in)
- Position: Midfielder

Team information
- Current team: Slovakia (assistant coach)

Senior career*
Years	Team	Apps	(Gls)
1995–1997	Nestor Marsciano	28	(0)
1997–1998	Perugia	0	(0)
1998–2003	Vis Pesaro	149	(3)
2003–2004	Padova	26	(0)
2004–2005	Ancona	23	(0)
2005–2008	Foligno	66	(3)
2008–2010	Cesena	52	(0)
2010–2012	Alessandria	60	(2)

Managerial career
- 2022–: Slovakia (assistant)
- * Club domestic league appearances and goals

Gianluca Segarelli (born 23 February 1978) is an Italian professional football coach and a former player. He is an assistant coach with the Slovakia national team.
