= Jacopo Fanucchi =

Italian football forward

Personal information
- Date of birth: 18 September 1981 (age 45)
- Place of birth: Lucca, Italy
- Height: 1.87 m (6 ft 2 in)
- Position: Forward

Team information
- Current team: Lucchese
- Number: 10

Senior career*
Years	Team	Apps	(Gls)
2001–2003	Prato	10	(0)
2003–2004	Larcianese	48	(3)
2004–2005	Pontedera	33	(11)
2005–2010	Figline	122	(19)
2010–2011	Empoli	6	(0)
2011	Pisa	14	(9)
2011–2013	Alessandria	54	(18)
2013–2014	A.C. Cuneo 1905	30	(9)
2014–2015	Prato	35	(9)
2015–	Lucchese	49	(10)
- * Club domestic league appearances and goals as of 26 September 2012

Jacopo Fanucchi (born 18 September 1981) is an Italian football forward who currently plays for Lucchese.
