= Andrea Servili =

Italian footballer and coach (born 1975)

Personal information
- Date of birth: 18 July 1975 (age 51)
- Place of birth: Ascoli Piceno, Italy
- Height: 1.87 m (6 ft 2 in)
- Position: Goalkeeper

Team information
- Current team: Alessandria (GK coach)

Senior career*
Years	Team	Apps	(Gls)
1992–1993	Sambenedettese	0	(0)
1993–1996	Santegidiese	47	(0)
1996–1997	Sambenedettese	5	(1)
1997–1998	Nereto	33	(0)
1998–1999	Tolentino	29	(0)
1999–2002	Teramo	65	(0)
2002–2008	Südtirol	201	(0)
2008–2014	Alessandria	177	(0)

Managerial career
- 2015–: Alessandria (GK coach)
- * Club domestic league appearances and goals

Andrea Servili (born 18 July 1975) is an Italian football coach and a former goalkeeper who works as a goalkeeping coach with Alessandria.

== Caps on football series ==
Lega Pro Prima Divisione : 23 (0)

Lega Pro Seconda Divisione : 300 (0)

Serie D : 114 (1)

Total : 437 (0)
