= Sondrio Calcio =

Italian football club

Sondrio
- Full name: Sondrio Calcio
- Nickname(s): I Azzurri (The Blues); I Valtellinesi (The Valtellinese); I Tri-Stellati (The Three Stars)
- Founded: 1932; 93 years ago
- Ground: Stadio Coni Castellina, Sondrio, Italy
- Capacity: 2,000
- Chairman: (Italy) Oriano Mostacchi
- Manager: (Italy) Omar Nordi
- League: Serie D/B
- 2017–18: Eccellenza Lombardy/B, 1st (promoted)
Home colours	Away colours

Sondrio Calcio is an Italian football club based in Sondrio, Lombardy. In 2020 the team went bankrupt but was founded again in 2021.

== History ==
=== Foundation ===
The club was founded in 1932 as Sondrio Sportiva, in 1985 was renamed Hard Sondrio Calcio and in 1993 Sondrio Calcio. Due to financial problems, due also to the President's lack of interest, the club officially failed in the summer of 2020. Was founded again in 2021.

=== Serie D ===
The team has played in Campionato Interregionale in 1958–1959 season, in Serie D from 1959 to 1966, in Campionato Interregionale from 1981 to 1986 and on 12 September 2014 was admitted in Serie D for the decision of Alta Corte di Giustizia of CONI.

== Colors ==
The club's colors are light blue and white.
