= Delta Calcio Porto Tolle SSD =

Italian football club

Delta Rovigo
- Full name: Delta Calcio Porto Tolle; Società Sportiva Dilettantistica a r.l.
- Founded: 1999 (as Delta 2000)
- Dissolved: 2022
- Ground: Stadio Francesco Gabrielli, Rovigo, Italy
- Capacity: 3,500
- League: Serie D/C
- 2021–22: 15th
Home colours	Away colours

Delta Calcio Porto Tolle or simply Delta Porto Tolle was an Italian association football club, based in Porto Tolle, Veneto.

The club last played in Serie D/C.

== History ==
Old Delta 2000 logo

The club was founded in 1999 as U.S. Delta 2000, that was based in Porto Tolle, after the merger of S.S. Carpano Cà Venier (founded in 1966), A.C. Porto Tollese (founded in 1966) and S.S. Polesine Camerini (founded in 1971).

Old Delta Porto Tolle logo

The team was promoted to Serie D in the 2010–11 season after an ascent started in Prima Categoria in the 1999–2000 season.

In the summer 2011 it was renamed Unione Sportiva Dilettantistica Calcio Delta Porto Tolle and in that 2013 Associazione Calcistica Delta Porto Tolle.

In the 2012–13 season it was promoted to Lega Pro Seconda Divisione, but in the next season it was relegated to Serie D.

In the summer 2014 it moved to Rovigo and was renamed Associazione Calcio Delta Porto Tolle Rovigo.

In the summer 2015 it was renamed Associazione Calcistica Delta Calcio Rovigo. In 2017 the club moved back to Porto Tolle and resumed its previous denomination of Delta Calcio Porto Tolle.

In July 2022, the club renounced on its right to play Serie D, thus effectively ending its existence.

== Colors and badge ==
The team's colors were blue and white.
