= Marco Martini =

Italian footballer and coach

Personal information
- Date of birth: 12 April 1979 (age 47)
- Place of birth: Rimini, Italy
- Height: 1.70 m (5 ft 7 in)
- Position: Forward

Team information
- Current team: Alessandria (assistant coach)

Senior career*
Years	Team	Apps	(Gls)
1997–1999	Padova	10	(1)
1999	Chieti	4	(0)
1999–2000	Fano	30	(9)
2000–2004	Vis Pesaro	97	(9)
2004–2006	Sambenedettese	51	(15)
2006–2007	Pescara	37	(8)
2006	→ Frosinone (loan)	13	(4)
2007–2009	Frosinone	38	(5)
2009	→ Reggiana (loan)	15	(4)
2009–2010	Perugia	27	(6)
2010–2012	Alessandria	46	(9)
2012	→ Pro Vercelli (loan)	12	(5)
2012–2014	Cuneo	41	(8)
2014	Santarcangelo	6	(1)
2014–2015	Vis Pesaro	10	(2)
2015–2017	Fiorita	46	(47)

Managerial career
- 2017–2019: Rimini (assistant)
- 2019: Rimini
- 2019–: Alessandria (assistant)
- 2020: Alessandria (caretaker)
- * Club domestic league appearances and goals

Marco Martini (born 12 April 1979) is an Italian football coach and former footballer. He is an assistant coach with Alessandria.

== Playing career ==
Born in Rimini, Emilia–Romagna, Martini started his career at Veneto club Padova. He then left for Chieti, Fano and Vis Pesaro. He played 4 seasons for Vis Pesaro before signed by Sambenedettese.

In January 2006 he joined Pescara along with Nico De Lucia. On 10 January he left for Frosinone in temporary deal. He won promotion playoffs at the end of 2005–06 Serie C1.

Martini returned to Pescara on 1 July 2006. He started 24 games in 2006–07 Serie B. The team relegated with the fewest points, fewest goals (along with Crotone) and the most goals conceded. Martini was the team top-scorer with 8 goals, ahead Daniele Vantaggiato with 7.

On 6 July 2007 he returned to Frosinone. He started 21 times. He had to compete with Éder and Massimo Margiotta in the second half of the season. That season he scored 5 goals, as the team fourth scorer behind Francesco Lodi, Éder and Felice Evacuo. Martini only made handful appearances in 2008–09 Serie B, and in January 2019 left for Reggiana. In August 2009 he left for Perugia along with Massimo Perra. After the bankrupt of Perugia, he joined Alessandria in July 2010. He renewed his contract in July 2011.

In January 2012 he was signed by Pro Vercelli in temporary deal with Stefano Santoni moved to opposite direction. On 23 August 2012 he left for Cuneo. On 31 January 2014 he terminated his contract with Cuneo and left for Santarcangelo.

== Coaching career ==
From 2017 he served as an assistant coach with Rimini.

On 17 June 2019, he was hired as an assistant coach by Alessandria. On 19 January 2020, Cristiano Scazzola was dismissed as head coach and Martini served as a caretaker for a 1–0 victory in Serie C against Gozzano on 22 January 2020. On 24 January 2020, Alessandria hired new head coach, Angelo Gregucci, finishing Martini's caretaker stint.
