= Federico Viviani (footballer, born 1981) =

Italian footballer

Personal information
- Date of birth: 19 October 1981 (age 45)
- Place of birth: Pisa, Italy
- Height: 1.78 m (5 ft 10 in)
- Position: Centre-back

Youth career
- Pisa

Senior career*
Years	Team	Apps	(Gls)
1999–2001	Pisa	1	(0)
2001–2003	Cascina	57	(4)
2003–2006	Sansovino	87	(5)
2006–2007	Arezzo	0	(0)
2006–2007	→ Juve Stabia (loan)	14	(0)
2007	→ Sansovino (loan)	13	(1)
2007–2008	Lanciano	17	(0)
2008–2009	Pisa	45	(4)
2009–2010	Taranto	18	(0)
2010–2011	Crotone	36	(1)
2011–2014	Alessandria	49	(6)
2014	Colligiana	13	(0)
2014–2015	Castiglionese		
- * Club domestic league appearances and goals

Federico Viviani (born 19 October 1981) is an Italian former footballer. Viviani made 280 league appearances in Italian Serie B, Serie C1 and Serie C2, as well as 70 appearances in Serie D, the top division of non fully professional football. However, Viviani never made his debut in Serie A, the Italian top division.

== Biography ==
=== Youth career ===
Born in Pisa, Tuscany, Viviani started his career at Pisa. He made his Serie C2 debut on 10 January 1999, replacing Paolo Andreotti at half-time.

In 2001–02 he left for Serie D club Cascina.

=== Lega Pro clubs ===
In 2003–04 he returned to fully professional for Sansovino. In January 2006 he was spotted by Serie B team Arezzo, which signed him in co-ownership deal and bought the remain 50% registration rights in June. However, he left for Serie C1 club Juve Stabia. In January 2007 he returned to Sansovino and winning the relegation "play-out" against Boca San Lazzaro, secured a place in 2007–08 Serie C2.

As Arezzo relegated to Serie C1 in 2007, he was sold to fellow third division club Lanciano in August.

=== Pisa & Crotone ===
In January 2008 he was re-signed by Serie B team Pisa. He only made 5 starts in 2007–08 Serie B and played 37 games in the next season. Pisa relegated in 2009 and bankrupted.

He then signed by Lega Pro Prima Divisione (ex–Serie C1) club Taranto. In January 2010 he returned to Serie B for the third time, for F.C. Crotone.

=== Return to Lega Pro ===
On 20 August 2011 he was signed by Alessandria. On 31 January 2014 Viviani was released.

== Career statistics ==
Club performance			League		Cup		Total	
Season	Club	League	Apps	Goals	Apps	Goals	Apps	Goals
Italy			League		Cup		Total	
1998–99	Pisa	Serie C2	1	0	?	?	?	?
1999–2000	Pisa	Serie C1	0	0	?	?	?	?
2001–02	Cascina	Serie D	27	1	?	?	?	?
2002–03	Cascina	Serie D	30	3	?	?	?	?
2003–04	Sansovino	Serie C2	24	1	?	?	?	?
2004–05	Sansovino	Serie C2	30	1	?	?	?	?
2005–06	Sansovino	Serie C2	33	3	?	?	?	?^{1}
2006–07	Juve Stabia	Serie C1	14	0	?	?	?	?
2006–07	Sansovino	Serie C2	13	1	Nil^{2}		15	1^{3}
2007–08	Lanciano	Serie C1	17	0	0	0	17	0
2007–08	Pisa	Serie B	8	0	Nil^{2}		8	0
2008–09	Pisa	Serie B	37	4	1	0	38	4
2009–10	Taranto	LP Prima Divisione	18	0	1+0	0+0	19	0
2009–10	Crotone	Serie B	13	1	Nil^{2}		13	1
2010–11	Crotone	Serie B	23	0	1	0	24	0
2011–12	Alessandria	LP Seconda Divisione	14	1	0+1	0	15	1
2012–13	Alessandria	LP Seconda Divisione	21	2	1	0	22	2
2013–14	Alessandria	LP Seconda Divisione	14	3	1	0	15	3
2014–15	Colligiana	Serie D	13	0	?	?	?	?
2014–15	Castiglionese	Eccellenza	?	?	?	?	?	?
Career total			350	21	6	0^{4}	356	21^{5}

Note
^{1} 4 games in 2005–06 Serie C2 promotion play-off
^{2} The player arrived the club after the club was eliminated from the competitions
^{3} 2 games in 2006–07 Serie C2 relegation "play-out"
^{4} No statistics for Coppa Italia Serie D and Coppa Italia Lega Pro (prior 2007)
^{5} Note 1 to 4

== Honours ==
- Serie C2: 1999
