= AC Giacomense =

Italian football club

Giacomense
- Full name: Associazione Calcio Giacomense S.r.l.
- Founded: 1967
- Dissolved: 2013 (merger)
- Ground: Stadio Savino Bellini, Portomaggiore, Italy
- Capacity: 2,500
Home colours	Away colours

Associazione Calcio Giacomense was an Italian association football club located in Masi San Giacomo, a frazione of Masi Torello, in the Province of Ferrara, Emilia-Romagna.

The club spent 5 seasons in professional football (Lega Pro) from 2008 to 2013. In 2013, the club sold its place in the league to S.P.A.L. 2013, a team based in the capital of the province which Giacomense was located.

== History ==
The club was founded in 1967 and its first president was Tino Droghetti in the league of Terza Categoria Ferrara.

After several years in the regional championships, in 2006, the team was promoted to Serie D from Eccellenza Emilia–Romagna/B. In its first season in Serie D, the company won a match in the playoffs but was eliminated in the first round by Castellarano.

On 20 April 2008 achieved its first historic promotion to Serie C2 after winning Serie D Girone D.

On 17 May 2009 it concluded its first season in the professional leagues, finishing in seventh place in the Lega Pro Seconda Divisione.

In football seasons 2009–10 and 2010–11 it avoided relegation twice: in the first case against Colligiana in the playoff (after finishing the season in fourteenth place), and the following year by repeating the best result in its history, coming seventh in the league.

In the 2012–13 season in Lega Pro Seconda Divisione the team finished in 11th place and it was saved again. However the club sold its sports title at the end of the season to Real SPAL in a merger with the major team of the province of Ferrara, which had been refounded in 2012–13 Serie D due to the bankruptcy of the previous entity, "SPAL 1907". In fact, the new club did not use the name Giacomense but changed to "SPAL 2013". SPAL had finished seventh in Group D in the 2012–13 season, failing to enter the promotion playoffs. As the FIGC allowed a club to move within a province to continue their sporting title, Giacomense was the only available club to buy in order to aid the return of SPAL to professional football.

== Colors and badge ==
The team's colours were red and grey.
