= Fabio Roselli (footballer) =

Italian footballer

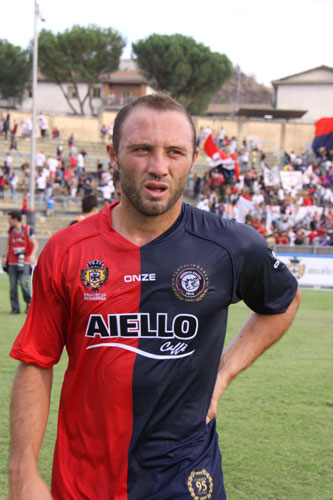

Personal information
- Date of birth: April 12, 1983 (age 43)
- Place of birth: Acri, Italy
- Height: 1.70 m (5 ft 7 in)
- Position: Midfielder

Team information
- Current team: Lecco
- Number: 24

Senior career*
Years	Team	Apps	(Gls)
2002–2003	Rossanese	29	(0)
2003–2004	SPAL	50	(3)
2005–2008	Arezzo	74	(1)
2006	→ Treviso (loan)	1	(0)
2008	→ Foggia (loan)	0	(0)
2008	Legnano	18	(0)
2009	Ravenna	11	(0)
2009–2011	Cosenza	55	(0)
2011–2013	Alessandria	67	(2)
2013–2014	Matera	19	(1)
2014–2015	Francavilla in Sinni	30	(1)
2015–2016	Reggina	18	(1)
2016	Catanzaro	9	(0)
2016–2017	Castelvetro Calcio	19	(0)
2017–	Lecco	14	(0)
- * Club domestic league appearances and goals as of 3 December 2017

Fabio Roselli (born 15 December 1983) is an Italian former professional footballer who played for Calcio Lecco 1912.

He played one game in the Serie A in the 2005-06 season for Treviso F.C. 1993.
