= 2010–11 Coppa Italia =

TIM Cup

Tournament details
- Country: Italy
- Dates: 8 Aug 2010 – 29 May 2011
- Teams: 78

Final positions
- Champions: Internazionale (7th title)
- Runners-up: Palermo

Tournament statistics
- Matches played: 79
- Goals scored: 239 (3.03 per match)
- Top goal scorer(s): Samuel Eto'o; Felice Evacuo (5 goals)

The 2010–11 Coppa Italia, also known as TIM Cup for sponsorship reasons, was the 64th edition of the domestic competition. As in the previous year, 78 clubs took part in the tournament. Internazionale were the cup holders and successfully retained the trophy. It was Inter Milan's last competitive title until winning the Serie A title in 2021.

== Participating teams ==
Serie A (20 teams)

- Bari
- Bologna
- Brescia
- Cagliari
- Catania
- Cesena
- Chievo
- Fiorentina
- Genoa
- Internazionale
- Juventus
- Lazio
- Lecce
- Milan
- Napoli
- Palermo
- Parma
- Roma
- Sampdoria
- Udinese

Serie B (22 teams)

- AlbinoLeffe
- Ascoli
- Atalanta
- Cittadella
- Crotone
- Empoli
- Frosinone
- Grosseto
- Livorno
- Modena
- Novara
- Padova
- Pescara
- Piacenza
- Portosummaga
- Reggina
- Sassuolo
- Siena
- Torino
- Triestina
- Varese
- Vicenza

Lega Pro (27 teams)

- Alessandria
- Atletico Roma
- Benevento
- Catanzaro
- Cavese
- Como
- Cosenza
- Cremonese
- FeralpiSalò
- Foligno
- Gubbio
- Juve Stabia
- Lucchese
- Lumezzane
- Monza
- Ravenna
- Reggiana
- Salernitana
- San Marino
- Sorrento
- SPAL
- Spezia
- Südtirol
- Taranto
- Ternana
- Hellas Verona
- Virtus Lanciano

LND - Serie D (9 teams)

- AlzanoCene
- Carpi
- Este
- Guidonia
- Pomezia
- Santegidiese
- Trapani
- Virtus Casarano
- Virtus Entella

== Format and seeding ==
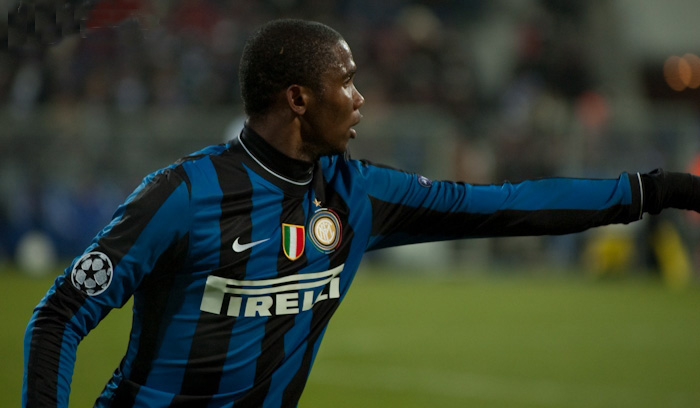
Samuel Eto'o, top scorer with five goals and man of the match in the final

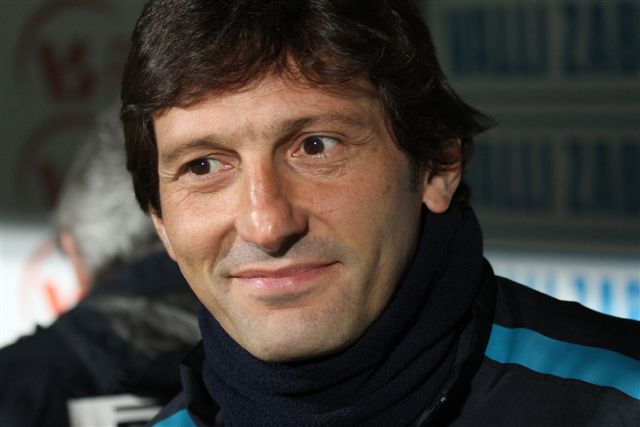
Leonardo won his first title as a coach

Teams entered the competition at various stages, as follows:

- First phase (one-legged fixtures)
  - First round: 36 teams from Lega Pro and Serie D started the tournament
  - Second round: the 18 winners from the previous round were joined by the 22 Serie B teams
  - Third round: the 20 winners from the second round met the 12 Serie A sides seeded 9–20
  - Fourth round: the 16 survivors face each other
- Second phase
  - Round of 16 (one-legged): the 8 fourth round winners were inserted into a bracket with the Serie A clubs seeded 1-8
  - Quarterfinals (one-legged)
  - Semifinals (two-legged)
- Final at the Stadio Olimpico in Rome

== Matches ==
=== Elimination rounds ===
==== Section 1 ====
First Round
56	Virtus Lanciano	2
65	Carpi	1
57	Sorrento	6
64	Catanzaro	0

Second Round
25	Piacenza (a.e.t.)	5
56	Virtus Lanciano	3
24	Modena	4
57	Sorrento	1

Third Round
16	Cagliari	3
25	Piacenza	0
17	Bologna	3
24	Modena	2

Fourth Round
16	Cagliari	0
17	Bologna	3

===== Match details =====
====== First round ======
8 August 2010
20:45 CEST

Virtus Lanciano	2–1	Carpi
Vastola 33'; Improta 58' (pen.)	Report	8' Cicino

Stadio Guido Biondi, Lanciano
Referee: Petroni (Italy)

8 August 2010
20:45 CEST

Sorrento	6–0	Catanzaro
Grassi 5'; Paulinho 49' (pen.); Manco 52'; De Giosa 70'; Vaccaro 73'; Erpen 81'	Report

Stadio Italia, Sorrento
Referee: Gavillucci (Italy)

====== Second round ======
14 August 2010
17:30 CEST

Piacenza	5–3 (a.e.t.)	Virtus Lanciano
Volpi 67', 95'; Cacia 77', 84', 115'	Report	50' Colombaretti; 70' Sacilotto; 71' Turchi

Stadio Leonardo Garilli, Piacenza
Referee: Pinzani (Italy)

14 August 2010
18:30 CEST

Modena	4–1	Sorrento
Signori 22'; Giampà 23'; Çani 53'; Stanco 90'	Report	79' Erpen

Stadio Alberto Braglia, Modena
Attendance: 1,879
Referee: Calvarese (Italy)

====== Third round ======
27 October 2010
20:30 CEST

Cagliari	3–0	Piacenza
Nenê 32', 45'; Acquafresca 60'	Report

Stadio Sant'Elia, Cagliari
Referee: Candussio (Italy)

27 October 2010
20:30 CEST

Bologna	3–2	Modena
Ramírez 61', 88'; Radovanović 83'	Report	32' Tamburini; 62' Mazzarani

Stadio Renato Dall'Ara, Bologna
Referee: Brighi (Italy)

====== Fourth round ======
25 November 2010
20:45 CET

Cagliari	0–3	Bologna
	Report	32' (pen.) Meggiorini; 84' Ramírez; 90+1' Giménez

Stadio Sant'Elia, Cagliari
Referee: Stefanini (Italy)

==== Section 2 ====
First Round
49	Cavese	0
72	Gubbio	2
48	Benevento	5
73	Este	1
47	Lumezzane	2
74	Pomezia	0

Second Round
32	Grosseto	5
72	Gubbio	0
33	Vicenza	2
48	Benevento	1
34	Ascoli	3
47	Lumezzane	1

Third Round
9	Genoa (a.e.t.)	2
32	Grosseto	1
33	Vicenza	1
34	Ascoli	0

Fourth Round
9	Genoa	3
33	Vicenza	1

===== Match details =====
====== First round ======
8 August 2010
16:00 CEST

Benevento	5–1	Este
Evacuo 39', 44', 50', 52', 56'	Report	31' Bedin

Stadio Santa Colomba, Benevento
Referee: Cifelli (Italy)

8 August 2010
17:00 CEST

Lumezzane	2–0	Pomezia
Galabinov 60', 71'	Report

Nuovo Stadio Comunale, Lumezzane
Referee: Lanza (Italy)

8 August 2010
20:45 CEST

Cavese	0–2	Gubbio
	Report	53' Sandreani; 65' Gomez

Stadio Simonetta Lamberti, Cava de' Tirreni
Referee: Soricaro (Italy)

====== Second round ======
15 August 2010
20:45 CEST

Grosseto	5–0	Gubbio
Freddi 22'; Caridi 25' (pen.); Turati 49'; Vitiello 58'; Guidone 71'	Report

Stadio Olimpico Carlo Zecchini, Grosseto
Attendance: 990
Referee: Palazzino (Italy)

15 August 2010
18:00 CEST

Vicenza	2–1	Benevento
Tonucci 7'; Sgrigna 28' (pen.)	Report	13' (pen.) Clemente

Stadio Romeo Menti, Vicenza
Referee: Giacomelli (Italy)

15 August 2010
20:45 CEST

Ascoli	3–1	Lumezzane
Mendicino 6'; Sommese 23'; Gazzola 32'	Report	66' Lauria

Stadio Cino e Lillo Del Duca, Ascoli Piceno
Attendance: 2,019
Referee: Cervellera (Italy)

====== Third round ======
20 October 2010
18:00 CEST

Genoa	2–1 (a.e.t.)	Grosseto
Toni 81', 119'	Report	52' Freddi

Stadio Luigi Ferraris, Genoa
Referee: Peruzzo (Italy)

27 October 2010
15:00 CEST

Vicenza	1–0	Ascoli
Rossi 63'	Report

Stadio Romeo Menti, Vicenza
Referee: Romeo (Italy)

====== Fourth round ======
24 November 2010
20:30 CET

Genoa	3–1 (a.e.t.)	Vicenza
Toni 87' (pen.), 92'; Destro 97'	Report	63' Salifu

Stadio Luigi Ferraris, Genoa
Referee: Gervasoni (Italy)

==== Section 3 ====
First Round
52	Salernitana	0
69	Südtirol	2

Second Round
29	Portosummaga	2
69	Südtirol	1
39	Crotone	1
42	Triestina	0
40	AlbinoLeffe	3
41	Pescara	1

Third Round
12	Lazio	3
29	Portosummaga	0
39	Crotone	0
40	AlbinoLeffe	1

Fourth Round
12	Lazio	3
40	AlbinoLeffe	0

===== Match details =====
====== First round ======
8 August 2010
21:00 CEST

Salernitana	0–2	Südtirol
	Report	32', 57' M. Romano

Stadio Arechi, Salerno
Referee: Roca (Italy)

====== Second round ======
14 August 2010
16:00 CEST

Portosummaga	2–1	Südtirol
Altinier 77'; Cunico 85'	Report	13' Campo

Stadio Friuli, Udine
Attendance: 300
Referee: Corletto (Italy)

14 August 2010
20:30 CEST

Crotone	1–0	Triestina
Degano 60'	Report

Stadio Ezio Scida, Crotone
Referee: Baratta (Italy)

15 August 2010
18:00 CEST

AlbinoLeffe	3–1	Pescara
Cissé 17' (pen.); Torri 45', 45+1'	Report	49' Maniero

Stadio Atleti Azzurri d'Italia, Bergamo
Referee: Nasca (Italy)

====== Third round ======
27 October 2010
21:00 CEST

Lazio	3–0	Portosummaga
González 8'; Kozák 35'; Bresciano 55'	Report

Stadio Olimpico, Rome
Referee: Giannoccaro (Italy)

27 October 2010
20:30 CEST

Crotone	0–1	AlbinoLeffe
	Report	54' Piccinni

Stadio Ezio Scida, Crotone
Referee: Guida (Italy)

====== Fourth round ======
25 November 2010
18:00 CET

Lazio	3–0	AlbinoLeffe
Garrido 16'; Stendardo 45'; Del Nero 84'	Report

Stadio Olimpico, Rome
Referee: Russo (Italy)

==== Section 4 ====
First Round
53	Como	3
68	Guidonia	1
60	Hellas Verona	2
61	Virtus Casarano	0

Second Round
28	Varese	3
53	Como	1
21	Cittadella	2
60	Hellas Verona	0

Third Round
13	Catania (a.e.t.)	4
28	Varese	3
20	Brescia	1
21	Cittadella	0

Fourth Round
13	Catania	5
20	Brescia	1

===== Match details =====
====== First round ======
8 August 2010
17:00 CEST

Como	3–1	Guidonia
Fortunato 24', 35'; Cozzolino 54'	Report	66' (pen.) Vittorini

Stadio Giuseppe Sinigaglia, Como
Referee: Pairetto (Italy)

8 August 2010
20:30 CEST

Hellas Verona	2–0	Virtus Casarano
Le Noci 15' (pen.); Ferrari 69'	Report

Stadio Marc'Antonio Bentegodi, Verona
Referee: Ros (Italy)

====== Second round ======
14 August 2010
17:30 CEST

Como	1–3	Varese
Prandelli 77'	Report	66' Cellini; 73' Pisano; 84' Gambadori

Stadio Giuseppe Sinigaglia, Como
Attendance: 713
Referee: Baracani (Italy)

14 August 2010
20:30 CEST

Cittadella	2–0	Hellas Verona
Perna 13'; Bellazzini 71' (pen.)	Report

Stadio Pier Cesare Tombolato, Cittadella
Attendance: 1,327
Referee: Candussio (Italy)

====== Third round ======
27 October 2010
20:45 CEST

Catania	4–3 (a.e.t.)	Varese
Pesce 12'; Antenucci 25'; Morimoto 57'; Spolli 116'	Report	52', 78' Eusepi; 77' (pen.) Frara

Stadio Angelo Massimino, Catania
Referee: Calvarese (Italy)

27 October 2010
20:30 CEST

Brescia	1–0	Cittadella
Diamanti 75'	Report

Stadio Mario Rigamonti, Brescia
Referee: Pinzani (Italy)

====== Fourth round ======
25 November 2010
20:45 CET

Catania	5–1	Brescia
Martinho 13'; Maxi López 55', 86'; Pesce 58'; Antenucci 82'	Report	18' Feczesin

Stadio Angelo Massimino, Catania
Referee: Ciampi (Italy)

==== Section 5 ====
First Round
54	Monza (a.e.t.)	2
67	Virtus Entella	1
59	Taranto	1
62	FeralpiSalò	0

Second Round
27	Sassuolo	3
54	Monza	1
22	Novara (a.e.t.)	3
59	Taranto	1

Third Round
14	Chievo	2
27	Sassuolo	0
19	Cesena	1
22	Novara (a.e.t.)	3

Fourth Round
14	Chievo	3
22	Novara	0

===== Match details =====
====== First round ======
8 August 2010
17:00 CEST

Monza	2–1 (a.e.t.)	Virtus Entella
Barjie 89'; Tuia 95'	Report	1' Soragna

Stadio Brianteo, Monza
Referee: Manganiello (Italy)

8 August 2010
20:30 CEST

Taranto	1–0	FeralpiSalò
Russo 82'	Report

Stadio Erasmo Iacovone, Taranto
Referee: Ripa (Italy)

====== Second round ======
15 August 2010
20:30 CEST

Novara	3–1 (a.e.t.)	Taranto
Motta 10'; Gigliotti 93'; Rubino 118'	Report	70' Innocenti

Stadio Silvio Piola, Novara
Referee: Merchiori (Italy)

15 August 2010
20:30 CEST

Sassuolo	3–1	Monza
Bruno 15'; Masucci 25'; Riccio 90'	Report	45' Samb

Stadio Alberto Braglia, Modena
Referee: Gallione (Italy)

====== Third round ======
28 October 2010
15:00 CEST

Chievo	2–0	Sassuolo
Mandelli 43'; Moscardelli 80'	Report

Stadio Marc'Antonio Bentegodi, Verona
Referee: Peruzzo (Italy)

27 October 2010
20:00 CEST

Cesena	1–3 (a.e.t.)	Novara
Schelotto 44'	Report	54' Rubino; 105' Evola; 111' Gigliotti

Stadio Dino Manuzzi, Cesena
Referee: Gervasoni (Italy)

====== Fourth round ======
30 November 2010
20:45 CET

Chievo	3–0	Novara
Granoche 24', 35' de Paula 82'	Report

Stadio Marc'Antonio Bentegodi, Verona
Referee: Pierpaoli (Italy)

==== Section 6 ====
First Round
51	Reggiana (a.e.t.)	2
70	AlzanoCene	1
44	SPAL	2
77	Trapani	3
43	Alessandria	6
78	Santegidiese	0

Second Round
30	Empoli	4
51	Reggiana	1
37	Frosinone	3
77	Trapani	1
38	Reggina	1
43	Alessandria	0

Third Round
11	Fiorentina (a.e.t.)	1
30	Empoli	0
37	Frosinone	2
38	Reggina (a.e.t.)	4

Fourth Round
11	Fiorentina	3
38	Reggina	0

===== Match details =====
====== First round ======
8 August 2010
17:30 CEST

SPAL	0–3 (awarded)	Trapani
Marongiu 76', 79'	Report	10' Gancitano; 13' Madonia; 81' Montalbano

Stadio Paolo Mazza, Ferrara
Referee: De Faveri (Italy)

8 August 2010
18:00 CEST

Reggiana	2–1 (a.e.t.)	AlzanoCene
Maritato 62'; Chinellato 107'	Report	9' Bernardi

Stadio Giglio, Reggio Emilia
Referee: Rocca (Italy)

8 August 2010
20:45 CEST

Alessandria	6–0	Santegidiese
Cammaroto 5'; Artico 20'; Martini 35', 45', 56', 69'	Report

Stadio Giuseppe Moccagatta, Alessandria
Referee: Brasi (Italy)

====== Second round ======
15 August 2010
20:30 CEST

Empoli	4–1	Reggiana
Coralli 10', 60'; Angella 30'; Cesaretti 42'	Report	28' Alessi

Stadio Carlo Castellani, Empoli
Referee: Ciampi (Italy)

15 August 2010
20:45 CEST

Frosinone	3–1	Trapani
Lodi 33' (pen.); Caetano 55'; Di Carmine 81'	Report	6' (pen.) Filippi

Stadio Matusa, Frosinone
Referee: Bagalini (Italy)

15 August 2010
20:45 CEST

Reggina	1–0	Alessandria
Zizzari 50'	Report

Stadio Oreste Granillo, Reggio Calabria
Referee: Doveri (Italy)

====== Third round ======
26 October 2010
20:45 CEST

Fiorentina	1–0 (a.e.t.)	Empoli
Babacar 118'	Report

Stadio Artemio Franchi, Florence
Referee: Celi (Italy)

27 October 2010
15:00 CEST

Frosinone	2–4 (a.e.t.)	Reggina
Basso 33', 43'	Report	40' Colombo; 51' Gia. Tedesco; 104' Castiglia; 120' Adiyiah

Stadio Matusa, Frosinone
Referee: Pierpaoli (Italy)

====== Fourth round ======
30 November 2010
20:45 CET

Fiorentina	3–0	Reggina
Babacar 29'; Marchionni 44'; Cerci 46'	Report

Stadio Artemio Franchi, Florence
Referee: Russo (Italy)

==== Section 7 ====
First Round
50	Cosenza (p.s.o.)	1 (5)
71	Lucchese	1 (3)
46	Foligno (a.e.t.)	3
75	San Marino	2
45	Cremonese (a.e.t.)	2
76	Atletico Roma	1

Second Round
31	Torino (a.e.t.)	3
50	Cosenza	1
35	Atalanta	3
46	Foligno	1
36	Livorno	1
45	Cremonese	0

Third Round
10	Bari	3
31	Torino	1
35	Atalanta	0
36	Livorno	1

Fourth Round
10	Bari	4
36	Livorno	1

===== Match details =====
====== First round ======
8 August 2010
20:30 CEST

Cosenza	1–1 (a.e.t.)	Lucchese
Musca 47'	Report	90' Carloto
Penalties
	5–3

Stadio San Vito, Cosenza
Referee: Intagliata (Italy)

8 August 2010
20:30 CEST

Foligno	3–2 (a.e.t.)	San Marino
Falcinelli 60'; Giacomelli 65'; Cavagna 103'	Report	13', 42' Cesca

Stadio Enzo Blasone, Foligno
Referee: Vallorani (Italy)

8 August 2010
20:30 CEST

Cremonese	2–1 (a.e.t.)	Atletico Roma
Bianchi 57'; Zanchetta 99'	Report	76' Padella

Stadio Giovanni Zini, Cremona
Referee: Bellutti (Italy)

====== Second round ======
14 August 2010
20:30 CEST

Atalanta	3–1	Foligno
Padoin 34'; Capelli 65'; Ardemagni 66'	Report	61' Sciaudone

Stadio Atleti Azzurri d'Italia, Bergamo
Referee: Massa (Italy)

15 August 2010
20:30 CEST

Livorno	1–0	Cremonese
Pagano 87'	Report

Stadio Armando Picchi, Livorno
Referee: Tozzi (Italy)

15 August 2010
20:45 CEST

Torino	3–1 (a.e.t.)	Cosenza
Iunco 54' (pen.); Obodo 99' (pen.); Belingheri 104'	Report	66' Biancolino

Stadio Olimpico, Turin
Referee: Ostinelli (Italy)

====== Third round ======
28 October 2010
20:45 CEST

Bari	3–1	Torino
Caputo 4'; Parisi 64' (pen.); Pulzetti 70'	Report	11' (o.g.) Rossi

Stadio San Nicola, Bari
Referee: Russo (Italy)

27 October 2010
18:00 CEST

Atalanta	0–1	Livorno
	Report	87' Cellerino

Stadio Atleti Azzurri d'Italia, Bergamo
Referee: De Marco (Italy)

====== Fourth round ======
1 December 2010
15:00 CET

Bari	4–1	Livorno
Rana 26' (pen.); A. Masiello 51'; E. Rivas 55'; D'Alessandro 73'	Report	90' Dionisi

Stadio San Nicola, Bari
Referee: Calvarese (Italy)

==== Section 8 ====
First Round
55	Ravenna	2
66	Juve Stabia	1
58	Ternana	3
63	Spezia	1

Second Round
26	Padova	1
55	Ravenna	0
23	Siena	2
58	Ternana	0

Third Round
15	Udinese	4
26	Padova	0
18	Lecce	3
23	Siena	2

Fourth Round
15	Udinese(a.e.t.)	2
18	Lecce	1

===== Match details =====
====== First round ======
8 August 2010
17:00 CEST

Ternana	3–1	Spezia
Noviello 15'; Savi 55'; Nitride 64'	Report	9' Lazzaro

Stadio Libero Liberati, Terni
Referee: Bietolini (Italy)

10 August 2010
20:30 CEST

Ravenna	2–1	Juve Stabia
Scappini 50'; Rossetti 73'	Report	14' Tarantino

Stadio Bruno Benelli, Ravenna
Referee: Ceccarelli (Italy)

====== Second round ======
12 August 2010
20:45 CEST

Siena	2–0	Ternana
Reginaldo 25'; Carobbio 57'	Report

Stadio Artemio Franchi, Siena
Referee: Giancola (Italy)

15 August 2010
20:30 CEST

Padova	1–0	Ravenna
Soncin 79'	Report

Stadio Artemio Franchi, Padua
Referee: Ruini (Italy)

====== Third round ======
27 October 2010
15:00 CEST

Udinese	4–0	Padova
Floro Flores 21'; Corradi 25', 57'; Angella 43'	Report

Stadio Friuli, Udine
Referee: Gava (Italy)

27 October 2010
20:45 CEST

Lecce	3–2	Siena
Bertolacci 42'; Corvia 51'; Chevantón 70'	Report	31' Immobile; 84' Kamatà

Stadio Via del Mare, Lecce
Referee: Damato (Italy)

====== Fourth round ======
24 November 2010
19:00 CET

Udinese	2–1 (a.e.t.)	Lecce
Corradi 78' (pen.); Floro Flores 119'	Report	17' Chevantón

Stadio Friuli, Udine
Referee: Peruzzo (Italy)

== Final stage ==
=== Bracket ===
Round of 16
1	Napoli	2
17	Bologna	1
8	Internazionale	3
9	Genoa	2
5	Roma	2
12	Lazio	1
4	Juventus	2
13	Catania	0
3	Palermo	1
14	Chievo	0
6	Parma (a.e.t.)	2
11	Fiorentina	1
7	Milan	3
10	Bari	0
2	Sampdoria (a.e.t.)	2(5)
15	Udinese	2(4)

Quarter-finals
1	Napoli	0(4)
8	Internazionale (a.e.t.)	0(5)
5	Roma	2
4	Juventus	0
3	Palermo (a.e.t.)	0(5)
6	Parma	0(4)
7	Milan	2
2	Sampdoria	1

Semi-finals
8	Internazionale	1	1	2
5	Roma	0	1	1
3	Palermo	2	2	4
7	Milan	2	1	3

Final
Internazionale	3
Palermo	1

==== Round of 16 ====
14 December 2010
21:00 CET

Parma	2–1 (a.e.t.)	Fiorentina
Crespo 115', 117'	Report	Santana 114'

Stadio Ennio Tardini, Parma
Attendance: 3,517
Referee: Paolo Mazzoleni

12 January 2011
17:30 CET

Palermo	1–0	Chievo
Miccoli 80' (pen.)	Report

Stadio Renzo Barbera, Palermo
Attendance: 6,602
Referee: Andrea De Marco

12 January 2011
21:00 CET

Internazionale	3–2	Genoa
Eto'o 15' 43'; Mariga 59'	Report	Kharja 54' (pen.); Sculli 90+1'

San Siro, Milan
Attendance: 15,254
Referee: Nicola Pierpaoli

13 January 2011
21:00 CET

Juventus	2–0	Catania
Krasić 35'; Pepe 54'	Report

Stadio Olimpico, Turin
Attendance: 5,441
Referee: Carmine Russo

18 January 2011
21:00 CET

Napoli	2–1	Bologna
Yebda 9'; Lavezzi 23'	Report	Meggiorini 56' (pen.)

Stadio San Paolo, Naples
Attendance: 33,806
Referee: Andrea Romeo

19 January 2011
17:30 CET

Sampdoria	2–2 (a.e.t.)	Udinese
Macheda 31'; Pazzini 108' (pen.)	Report	Isla 90'; Denis 91'
Penalties
Mannini (penalty scored); Pozzi (penalty scored); Guberti (penalty scored); Ziegler (penalty missed); Pazzini (penalty scored); Tissone (penalty scored)	5–4	(penalty scored) Sánchez; (penalty scored) Abdi; (penalty scored) Inler; (penalty scored) Armero; (penalty missed) Denis; (penalty missed) Isla

Stadio Luigi Ferraris, Genoa
Attendance: 5,082
Referee: Domenico Celi

19 January 2011
21:00 CET

Roma	2–1	Lazio
Borriello 53' (pen.); Simplício 77'	Report	Hernanes 57' (pen.)

Stadio Olimpico, Rome
Attendance: 40,637
Referee: Mauro Bergonzi

20 January 2011
21:00 CET

Milan	3–0	Bari
Ibrahimović 19'; Merkel 45+1'; Robinho 65'	Report

San Siro, Milan
Attendance: 9,391
Referee: Maurizio Ciampi

==== Quarter-finals ====
25 January 2011
21:00 CET

Palermo	0–0 (a.e.t.)	Parma
	Report
Penalties
Cassani (penalty missed); Bovo (penalty scored); Balzaretti (penalty scored); Nocerino (penalty scored); Pastore (penalty scored); Jara Martínez (penalty scored)	5–4	(penalty missed) Crespo; (penalty scored) Palladino; (penalty scored) Modesto; (penalty scored) Candreva; (penalty scored) Giovinco; (penalty missed) Valiani

Stadio Renzo Barbera, Palermo
Attendance: 15,335
Referee: Christian Brighi

26 January 2011
17:30 CET

Sampdoria	1–2	Milan
Guberti 51'	Report	Pato 17', 22'

Stadio Luigi Ferraris, Genoa
Attendance: 11,458
Referee: Paolo Mazzoleni

26 January 2011
20:45 CET

Napoli	0–0 (a.e.t.)	Internazionale
	Report
Penalties
Cavani (penalty scored); Hamšík (penalty scored); Lavezzi (penalty missed); Zúñiga (penalty scored); Yebda (penalty scored)	4 – 5	(penalty scored) Eto'o; (penalty scored) Cambiasso; (penalty scored) Pandev; (penalty scored) Motta; (penalty scored) Chivu

Stadio San Paolo, Naples
Attendance: 40,580
Referee: Paolo Valeri

27 January 2011
20:45 CET

Juventus	0–2	Roma
	Report	Vučinić 65'; Taddei 90+1'

Stadio Olimpico, Turin
Attendance: 18,300
Referee: Antonio Damato

==== Semi-finals ====
===== First leg =====
19 April 2011
20:45 CEST

Roma	0–1	Internazionale
	Report	Stanković 45'

Stadio Olimpico, Rome
Attendance: 42,582
Referee: Nicola Rizzoli
20 April 2011
20:45 CEST

Milan	2–2	Palermo
Ibrahimović 4'; Emanuelson 76'	Report	Pastore 14'; Hernández 53'

San Siro, Milan
Attendance: 20,022
Referee: Andrea De Marco

===== Second leg =====
11 May 2011
20:45 CEST

Internazionale	1–1	Roma
Eto'o 58'	Report	Borriello 84'

San Siro, Milan
Attendance: 33,094
Referee: Daniele Orsato

Internazionale won 2–1 on aggregate.

10 May 2011
20:45 CEST

Palermo	2–1	Milan
Migliaccio 63'; Bovo 73' (pen.)	Report	Ibrahimović 90+4'

Stadio Renzo Barbera, Palermo
Attendance: 29,500
Referee: Gianluca Rocchi

Palermo won 4–3 on aggregate.

== Final ==
29 May 2011
21:00 CEST

Internazionale	3–1	Palermo
Eto'o 26', 76'; Milito 90+2'	Report	Muñoz 88'

Stadio Olimpico, Rome
Attendance: 70,000
Referee: Emidio Morganti

== Top goalscorers ==
Rank	Player	Club	Goals
1	(Cameroon) Samuel Eto'o	Internazionale	5
1	(Italy) Felice Evacuo	Benevento	5
3	(Italy) Luca Toni	Genoa, Juventus	4
3	(Italy) Marco Martini	Alessandria	4
5	(Sweden) Zlatan Ibrahimović	Milan	3
5	(Uruguay) Gastón Ramírez	Bologna	3
5	(Italy) Daniele Cacia	Piacenza	3
5	(Italy) Bernardo Corradi	Udinese	3
