= 2010–11 Calcio Portogruaro Summaga season =

Portogruaro
2010–11 season
- President: Francesco Mio
- Head Coach: Fabio Viviani, Andrea Agostinelli
- Home stadium: Stadio Piergiovanni Mecchia (Portogruaro played the first 5 home matches at Stadio Friuli in Udine.)
- Serie B: 21st (relegated)
- Coppa Italia: Third Round
- Highest home attendance: 2500 (Calcio Portogruaro Summaga vs. Torino F.C.)
Home colours	Away colours	Third colours

The 2010–11 season was Portogruaro's 20th season of football and it is the first season in the Serie B, Italian second division.

== Squad ==
- Francesco Rossi
- Matteo Lanzoni
- Salvatore D'Elia
- Filippo Cristante
- Andrea Pisani
- Adrian Madaschi
- Vinicio Espinal
- Christian Altinier
- Marco Cunico
- Piá
- Nicolas Amodio
- Luca Scapuzzi
- Matteo Scozzarella
- Ivan Franceschini
- Alessandro Cibocchi
- Emiliano Tarana
- Gabriele Puccio
- Denny Cardin
- Andrea Bavena
- Eros Schiavon
- Riccardo Bocalon
- Mirko Giacobbe
- Federico Gerardi
- Marco Esposito
- Francesco Scarpa

== Competitions ==
=== Standings ===
Pos	Team	Pld	W	D	L	GF	GA	GD	Pts	Promotion or relegation
18	AlbinoLeffe	42	13	10	19	55	66	−11	49	Qualification to relegation play-offs
19	Piacenza (R)	42	11	13	18	50	63	−13	46	Qualification to relegation play-offs
20	Triestina (R)	42	8	16	18	34	57	−23	40 (Note: TRI 0–0 POR ; POR 1–2 TRI)	Relegation to Lega Pro Prima Divisione
21	Portogruaro (R)	42	10	10	22	39	63	−24	40	Relegation to Lega Pro Prima Divisione
22	Frosinone (R)	42	8	14	20	46	64	−18	38	Relegation to Lega Pro Prima Divisione

Source: Lega Serie B
Rules for classification: 1st points, 2nd head-to-head, 3rd goal difference, 4th goals for
(R) Relegated

== Coppa Italia ==
=== Second round ===
14 August 2010
16:00 CEST

Portosummaga	2 – 1	Südtirol
Altinier 77'; Cunico 85'	Report	13' Campo

Stadio Friuli, Udine
Attendance: 300
Referee: Corletto (Italy)

=== Third round ===
27 October 2010
21:00 CEST

Lazio	3 – 0	Portosummaga
González 8'; Kozák 35'; Bresciano 55'	Report

Stadio Olimpico, Rome
Referee: Giannoccaro (Italy)

== Transfers (1/7 - 1/9) ==
=== IN ===
Acquisti
R.	Nome	da	Modalità
P	Andrea Bavena	F.C. Internazionale Milano	co-ownership
D	Filippo Cristante	A.C. Ancona	definitive
D	Matteo Lanzoni	Sampdoria	loan
D	Gabriele Puccio	F.C. Internazionale Milano	co-ownership
C	Nicolás Amodio	Napoli Calcio	loan
C	Stefano Pondaco	Sampdoria	definitive
C	Eros Schiavon	SPAL	definitive
C	Emiliano Tarana	Mantova Calcio	definitive
A	Christian Altinier	Mantova Calcio	co-ownership
A	Federico Gerardi	Udinese	loan
A	Inacio Pia	Napoli Calcio	definitive

=== OUT ===
Cessioni
R.	Nome	a	Modalità
D	Umberto Gardella	Ravenna F.C.	definitivo
C	Stefano Pondaco	A.S. Lucchese Libertas 1905	prestito
A	Simone Corazza	Valenzana Calcio	Loan
A	Matias Cuffa	Calcio Padova	definitivo

== Transfers 3/1 al 31/1 ==
=== IN ===
- Ivan Franceschini
- Alessandro Cibocchi
- Francesco Scarpa
