= 2009–10 Calcio Portogruaro Summaga season =

Portogruaro
2009–10 season
- President: Francesco Mio
- Head Coach: Alessandro Calori
- Home stadium: Stadio Piergiovanni Mecchia
- Lega Pro 1: 1st
Home colours	Away colours	Third colours

The 2009–10 season was Portogruaro's 19th season of football and it is the second season in the Lega Pro 1, Italian third division.

== Squad ==
- Francesco Rossi
- Christian Altinier
- Riccardo Bocalon
- Denny Cardin
- Carlo Cherubini
- Marco Cunico
- Vinicio Espinal
- Matteo Deinite
- Massimo Gotti
- Marco Cunico
- Fabio Levacovich
- Adrian Madaschi
- Andrea Maniero
- Ettore Marchi
- Stefano Pondaco
- Gabriele Puccio
- Luca Scapuzzi
- Matteo Scozzarella
- Angelo Siniscalchi
- Gianmario Specchia
- Bruno Leonardo Vicente

== Competitions ==
=== Standings ===
Pos	Team	Pld	W	D	L	GF	GA	GD	Pts	Promotion or relegation
1	Portogruaro (C, P)	34	16	11	7	39	26	+13	59	Promotion to Serie B
2	Pescara (P)	34	15	13	6	39	25	+14	58	Promotion to Serie B
3	Hellas Verona	34	13	16	5	38	20	+18	55	Qualification for Promotion play-off
4	Rimini (R)	34	15	6	13	39	36	+3	51	Relegation to Serie D (Note: Rimini declared bankrupt and relegated to Serie D.)
5	Reggiana	34	13	10	11	45	38	+7	49	Qualification for Promotion play-off

Source: corrieredellosport.it
(C) Champions; (P) Promoted; (R) Relegated
