= Simone Sales =

Italian footballer

Personal information
- Date of birth: 31 January 1988 (age 38)
- Place of birth: Sanarica, Italy
- Height: 1.84 m (6 ft 0 in)
- Positions: Centre back; right back

Youth career
- –2007: Atalanta

Senior career*
Years	Team	Apps	(Gls)
2007–2009	Cuoiopelli Cappiano	35	(0)
2009–2014	Cremonese	68	(1)
2013–2014	→ Lecce (loan)	14	(0)
2014–2015	Venezia	30	(0)
2015–2016	Carrarese	25	(0)
2016–2018	Teramo	53	(0)
2018–2020	Potenza	47	(1)
2020–2021	Monopoli	13	(0)
2021	Catania	11	(0)
2021	Team Altamura	11	(0)
Total		307	(2)
- * Club domestic league appearances and goals

Simone Sales (born 31 January 1988) is an Italian former footballer who plays as a centre back.

== Biography ==
Born in Sanarica, the Province of Lecce, Apulia, Sales started his career at Lombard club Atalanta. Sales was the member of the under-18 team in 2005–06 season. Sales was promoted to under-19 team in 2006–07 season.

In July 2007 Sales joined Cuoio Pelli – Cappiano Romaiano in co-ownership deal. Sales earned a call-up to Italy under-20 Serie C team in September 2008; he represent Group B of Lega Pro 2nd Division in Lega Pro Quadrangular Tournament in January 2009.

In June 2009 Atalanta bought him back, and re-sold Sales to another Lombard club Cremonese in another co-ownership deal for €7,500. In June 2011 Atalanta gave up the remain 50% registration rights for free. (Note: Atalanta only listed a lump-sum co-ownership financial cost of €2,765,750 (Manzoni €1,500,000; Cissé €699,500; Cia €399,500; Bergamelli €149,500; Cardin, Sales €7,500 each; Arrigoni, Bertoli, Gavazzeni, Meduri €500 each; Franciosi €250)) Cremonese extended the contract of Sales and Mauro Minelli on 3 July 2013.

On 2 September 2013 Sales went back to hometown club Lecce in a temporary deal, with Carmine Palumbo moved to opposite direction.

On 30 July 2020 he moved to Monopoli on a 2-year contract.

On 12 January 2021 he signed a 1.5-year contract with Catania.

On 27 August 2021 he moved to Team Altamura in Serie D.
