= Denny Cardin =

Italian footballer (born 1988)

Personal information
- Date of birth: 3 August 1988 (age 38)
- Place of birth: Monastier di Treviso, Italy
- Height: 1.80 m (5 ft 11 in)
- Position: Defender

Team information
- Current team: ACD Portomansuè

Youth career
- Atalanta

Senior career*
Years	Team	Apps	(Gls)
2007–2011	Portogruaro	67	(0)
2011–2012	Foggia	27	(0)
2013	Carpi	2	(0)
2013–2014	Mantova	29	(0)
2014–2016	Pavia	25	(1)
2016–2017	Pro Piacenza	40	(0)
2017–	ACD Portomansuè	?	(?)

International career
2008–2009	Italy U-20 Lega Pro	3	(0)
- * Club domestic league appearances and goals

Denny Cardin (born 3 August 1988) is an Italian footballer who plays for ACD Portomansuè.

== Biography ==
Since 2007–08 season, Cardin was co-owned by Portogruaro and Atalanta. The club purchased Cardin and Matteo Scozzarella for €7,500 each. He followed the team promoted to Lega Pro Prima Divisione in 2008 as playoff winner. In 2010 the team promoted to Serie B. However the team relegated in 2011. Atalanta gave up the remain 50% registration rights in June 2011 for free. (Note: Atalanta only listed a lump-sum co-ownership financial cost of €2,765,750 (Manzoni €1,500,000; Cissé €699,500; Cia €399,500; Bergamelli €149,500; Cardin, Sales €7,500 each; Arrigoni, Bertoli, Gavazzeni, Meduri €500 each; Franciosi €250))

In July 2011 he left for Foggia. On 8 February 2013 he was signed by Carpi. On 5 July 2013 he was signed by Mantova F.C.

=== Representative teams ===
He played for Italy under-20 Lega Pro representative team in 2008–09 Mirop Cup. He also finished as the runner-up in 2008 Trofeo Dossena with the representative team, but not played in the final against Grêmio youth team.

== Honours ==
- Lega Pro Prima Divisione: 2010
