= 2001–02 SS Lazio season =

Lazio
2001–02 season
- Owner: Sergio Cragnotti
- President: Sergio Cragnotti
- Manager: Dino Zoff (until 23 September 2001); Alberto Zaccheroni
- Stadium: Olimpico
- Serie A: 6th (in UEFA Cup)
- Coppa Italia: Quarter-finals
- UEFA Champions League: First group stage
- Top goalscorer: League: Hernán Crespo (13); All: Hernán Crespo (20)
- Average home league attendance: 42,684
Home colours	Away colours	Third colours

The 2001–02 season was the 102nd season in Società Sportiva Lazio's history and their 14th consecutive season in the top-flight of Italian football.

== Squad ==
Squad at end of season

Note: Flags indicate national team as defined under FIFA eligibility rules; some limited exceptions apply. Players may hold more than one non-FIFA nationality.

No.	Pos.	Nation	Player
1	GK	ITA	Luca Marchegiani
2	DF	ITA	Francesco Colonnese
3	DF	BRA	César
4	MF	ITA	Dino Baggio
5	MF	YUG	Dejan Stanković
6	MF	ESP	Gaizka Mendieta
7	FW	ARG	Claudio López
8	MF	CZE	Karel Poborský
10	FW	ARG	Hernán Crespo
11	DF	YUG	Siniša Mihajlović
12	GK	ITA	Diego Favazza
13	DF	ITA	Alessandro Nesta
14	MF	ARG	Diego Simeone
15	DF	ITA	Giuseppe Pancaro
16	MF	ITA	Giuliano Giannichedda
17	DF	ITA	Guerino Gottardi
18	DF	ITA	Paolo Negro
19	DF	ITA	Giuseppe Favalli

No.	Pos.	Nation	Player
20	MF	ITA	Stefano Fiore
21	FW	ITA	Simone Inzaghi
22	GK	ITA	Emanuele Concetti
23	MF	ESP	Iván de la Peña
24	DF	POR	Fernando Couto
25	DF	ITA	Alberto Comazzi
26	MF	ARG	Lucas Castromán
27	MF	ITA	Manuel Mancini
28	MF	ITA	Fabio Liverani
30	FW	ITA	Giuseppe Le Noci
31	DF	NED	Jaap Stam
32	DF	ITA	Fabio Calandrelli
33	FW	ITA	Felice Evacuo
34	MF	ITA	Daniele Merondi
35	MF	ITA	Alessandro Gazzi
36	FW	ITA	Alessandro Turchetta
37	DF	ITA	Mauro Coppini
70	GK	ITA	Angelo Peruzzi

=== Left club during season ===
Note: Flags indicate national team as defined under FIFA eligibility rules; some limited exceptions apply. Players may hold more than one non-FIFA nationality.

No.	Pos.	Nation	Player
9	FW	YUG	Darko Kovačević (to Real Sociedad)
28	DF	GHA	Daniel Ola (to Chievo)

No.	Pos.	Nation	Player
29	FW	ITA	Emanuele Berrettoni (to Perugia)

=== Transfers ===
In
Pos.	Name	from	Type
MF	Gaizka Mendieta	Valencia	€48.00 million
DF	Jaap Stam	Manchester United	€25.75 million
FW	Darko Kovačević	Juventus	€15.00 million
DF	César	Sao Caetano	
MF	Fabio Liverani	Perugia	
DF	Alberto Comazzi	Monza	
FW	Felice Evacuo	Turris	
MF	Stefano Fiore	Udinese	loan ended
MF	Giuliano Giannichedda	Udinese	loan ended
GK	Emanuele Concetti	Arezzo	loan ended
MF	Iván de la Peña	Barcelona	loan ended
MF	Alessandro Gazzi	Treviso	loan

Out
Pos.	Name	To	Type
MF	Pavel Nedved	Juventus	€45.00 million
MF	Juan Veron	Manchester United	€42.60 million
FW	Marcelo Salas	Juventus	€25.00 million
DF	Maurizio Domizzi	A.C. Milan	
MF	Andrea Luciani	Salernitana	
FW	Emanuele Berrettoni	Perugia	co-ownership
FW	Fabrizio Ravanelli	Derby County	end of contract
GK	Paolo Orlandoni	Reggina	loan ended
FW	Daniele Ruggiu	Cittadella	loan
DF	Daniel Ola	Chievo	loan
DF	Emanuele Pesaresi	Benfica	loan
MF	Roberto Baronio	Fiorentina	loan

==== Winter ====
In
Pos.	Name	from	Type
DF	Daniel Ola	Chievo	loan ended

Out
Pos.	Name	To	Type
DF	Daniel Ola	L'Aquila	loan
FW	Darko Kovačević	Real Sociedad	co-ownership

== Competitions ==
=== Serie A ===
==== League table ====
Pos	Team	Pld	W	D	L	GF	GA	GD	Pts	Qualification or relegation
4	Milan	34	14	13	7	47	33	+14	55	Qualification to Champions League third qualifying round
5	Chievo	34	14	12	8	57	52	+5	54	Qualification to UEFA Cup first round
6	Lazio	34	14	11	9	50	37	+13	53	Qualification to UEFA Cup first round
7	Bologna	34	15	7	12	40	40	0	52	Qualification to Intertoto Cup third round
8	Perugia	34	13	7	14	38	46	−8	46	Qualification to Intertoto Cup third round

Source: 2001–02 Serie A, Soccerway
Rules for classification: 1) Points; 2) Head-to-head points; 3) Head-to-head goal difference; 4) Goal difference; 5) Goals scored; 6) Draw. (Note: Head-to-head record is used only after all the matches between the teams in question have been played).

==== Results summary ====
Overall								Home						Away					
Pld	W	D	L	GF	GA	GD	Pts	W	D	L	GF	GA	GD	W	D	L	GF	GA	GD
34	14	11	9	50	37	+13	53	10	6	1	38	18	+20	4	5	8	12	19	−7

==== Results by round ====
Round	1	2	3	4	5	6	7	8	9	10	11	12	13	14	15	16	17	18	19	20	21	22	23	24	25	26	27	28	29	30	31	32	33	34	35
Ground	A	H	A	H	A	H	A	H	H	A	H	A	H	A	H	P	A	H	H	A	H	A	H	A	H	A	A	H	A	H	A	H	A	H	A
Result	D	D	D	L	D	W	D	L	W	W	W	W	W	L	D	-	D	L	W	L	L	D	L	D	W	W	L	D	W	D	W	W	W	L	W
Position	5	9	10	13	15	10	11	13	10	8	5	5	4	5	6	6	7	7	7	7	7	8	8	9	7	7	7	7	7	7	7	7	5	7	6

Source: Competitive matches
A = Away; H = Home; W = Win; D = Draw; L = Loss; P = Postponed; = Leader, 2002–03 UEFA Champions League Group stage; = 2002–03 UEFA Champions League Group stage; = 2002–03 UEFA Champions League Second qualifying round; = 2002–03 UEFA Cup First round; = 2002 UEFA Intertoto Cup; = 2002-03 Serie B

==== Matches ====
26 August 2001 1	Lazio	1–1	Piacenza	Rome
15:00 CEST (UTC+02:00)	C. López 17'		Matuzalém 77'	Stadium: Stadio Olimpico; Attendance: 36,367; Referee: Cosimo Bolognino

2 September 2001 2	Perugia	0–0	Lazio	Perugia
15:00 CEST (UTC+02:00)				Stadium: Stadio Renato Curi; Attendance: 13,331; Referee: Gianluca Paparesta

15 September 2001 3	Lazio	0–0	Torino	Rome
15:00 CEST (UTC+02:00)				Stadium: Stadio Olimpico; Attendance: 38,686; Referee: Paolo Bertini

22 September 2001 4	Milan	2–0	Lazio	Milan
20:30 CEST (UTC+02:00)	F. Inzaghi 41'; Laursen 56'			Stadium: San Siro; Attendance: 57,048; Referee: Salvatore Racalbuto

29 September 2001 5	Lazio	0–0	Parma	Rome
20:30 CEST (UTC+02:00)				Stadium: Stadio Olimpico; Attendance: 37,327; Referee: Stefano Braschi

7 October 2001 7	Lazio	2–0	Atalanta	Rome
15:00 CEST (UTC+02:00)	C. López 42'; Couto 71'			Stadium: Stadio Olimpico; Attendance: 36,368; Referee: Paolo Bertini

20 October 2001 8	Venezia	0–0	Lazio	Venice
15:00 CEST (UTC+02:00)				Stadium: Stadio Pier Luigi Penzo; Attendance: 8,293; Referee: Roberto Rosetti

27 October 2001 9	Roma	2–0	Lazio	Rome
20:30 CEST (UTC+02:00)	Delvecchio 49'; Totti 50'			Stadium: Stadio Olimpico; Attendance: 76,528; Referee: Graziano Cesari

3 November 2001 10	Lazio	5–0	Brescia	Rome
15:00 CET (UTC+01:00)	Crespo 6', 32', 79'; S. Inzaghi 39'; Stanković 63'			Stadium: Stadio Olimpico; Attendance: 35,891; Referee: Alfredo Trentalange

10 November 2001 11	Udinese	1–4	Lazio	Udine
15:00 CET (UTC+01:00)	Caballero 78'		Crespo 54', 89'; Liverani 74'; C. López 84'	Stadium: Stadio Friuli; Attendance: 14,824; Referee: Fiorenzo Treossi

24 November 2001 12	Lazio	1–0	Juventus	Rome
20:30 CET (UTC+01:00)	Liverani 49'			Stadium: Stadio Olimpico; Attendance: 60,342; Referee: Pierluigi Collina

2 December 2001 13	Lecce	1–2	Lazio	Lecce
15:00 CET (UTC+01:00)	Cirillo 66'		Crespo 58' (pen.); S. Inzaghi 61'	Stadium: Stadio Via del Mare; Attendance: 13,056; Referee: Roberto Rosetti

9 December 2001 14	Lazio	3–0	Fiorentina	Rome
15:00 CET (UTC+01:00)	Poborský 12'; Crespo 56'; C. López 86'			Stadium: Stadio Olimpico; Attendance: 38,090; Referee: Paolo Bertini

16 December 2001 15	Hellas Verona	3–1	Lazio	Verona
15:00 CET (UTC+01:00)	Camoranesi 41'; Colucci 66'; Mutu 72'		Crespo 55'	Stadium: Stadio Marc'Antonio Bentegodi; Attendance: 15,158; Referee: Gennaro Borriello

22 December 2001 16	Lazio	2–2	Bologna	Rome
20:30 CET (UTC+01:00)	C. López 19', 34'		Cruz 41'; Zaccardo 76'	Stadium: Stadio Olimpico; Attendance: 35,576; Referee: Gianluca Paparesta

6 January 2002 17	Internazionale	0–0	Lazio	Milan
20:30 CET (UTC+01:00)				Stadium: San Siro; Attendance: 54,380; Referee: Domenico Messina

13 January 2002 18	Piacenza	1–0	Lazio	Piacenza
15:00 CET (UTC+01:00)	Hübner 69'			Stadium: Stadio Leonardo Garilli; Attendance: 7,507; Referee: Graziano Cesari

19 January 2002 19	Lazio	5–0	Perugia	Rome
15:00 CET (UTC+01:00)	S. Inzaghi 9'; C. López 32'; Fiore 52'; Stanković 57'; Negro 63'			Stadium: Stadio Olimpico; Attendance: 34,930; Referee: Paolo Bertini

27 January 2002 20	Torino	1–0	Lazio	Turin
15:00 CET (UTC+01:00)	Lucarelli 61'			Stadium: Stadio delle Alpi; Attendance: 15,469; Referee: Daniele Tombolini

30 January 2002 6	Chievo	3–1	Lazio	Verona
20:30 CET (UTC+01:00)	Marazzina 46'; Corini 77', 88' (pen.)		C. López 7'	Stadium: Stadio Marc'Antonio Bentegodi; Attendance: 10,999; Referee: Pierluigi Collina

3 February 2002 21	Lazio	1–1	Milan	Rome
15:00 CET (UTC+01:00)	Stanković 20'		Shevchenko 90'	Stadium: Stadio Olimpico; Attendance: 39,237; Referee: Emilio Pellegrino

10 February 2002 22	Parma	1–0	Lazio	Parma
15:00 CET (UTC+01:00)	Di Vaio 67'			Stadium: Stadio Ennio Tardini; Attendance: 17,256; Referee: Stefano Farina

17 February 2002 23	Lazio	1–1	Chievo	Rome
20:30 CET (UTC+01:00)	S. Inzaghi 31'		Legrottaglie 85'	Stadium: Stadio Olimpico; Attendance: 38,330; Referee: Domenico Messina

24 February 2002 24	Atalanta	0–1	Lazio	Bergamo
15:00 CET (UTC+01:00)			Poborský 78'	Stadium: Stadio Atleti Azzurri d'Italia; Attendance: 15,191; Referee: Gennaro Borriello

3 March 2002 25	Lazio	4–2	Venezia	Rome
15:00 CET (UTC+01:00)	Crespo 24', 45+3' (pen.), 74'; Pancaro 45'		Bettarini 67'; Maniero 73'	Stadium: Stadio Olimpico; Attendance: 36,654; Referee: Emidio Morganti

10 March 2002 26	Lazio	1–5	Roma	Rome
20:30 CET (UTC+01:00)	Stanković 59'		Montella 12', 29', 36', 63'; Totti 71'	Stadium: Stadio Olimpico; Attendance: 72,454; Referee: Roberto Rosetti

17 March 2002 27	Brescia	1–1	Lazio	Brescia
15:00 CET (UTC+01:00)	Yllana 90' (pen.)		Crespo 56'	Stadium: Stadio Mario Rigamonti; Attendance: 14,064; Referee: Fiorenzo Treossi

24 March 2002 28	Lazio	2–0	Udinese	Rome
15:00 CET (UTC+01:00)	Stanković 32'; Fiore 79'			Stadium: Stadio Olimpico; Attendance: 35,410; Referee: Salvatore Racalbuto

30 March 2002 29	Juventus	1–1	Lazio	Turin
20:30 CET (UTC+01:00)	Trezeguet 37'		C. López 24'	Stadium: Stadio delle Alpi; Attendance: 40,075; Referee: Cosimo Bolognino

7 April 2002 30	Lazio	1–0	Lecce	Rome
20:30 CEST (UTC+02:00)	Fiore 68'			Stadium: Stadio Olimpico; Attendance: 35,856; Referee: Stefano Farina

14 April 2002 31	Fiorentina	0–1	Lazio	Florence
15:00 CEST (UTC+02:00)			Castromán 24'	Stadium: Stadio Artemio Franchi; Attendance: 14,343; Referee: Emilio Pellegrino

21 April 2002 32	Lazio	5–4	Hellas Verona	Rome
15:00 CEST (UTC+02:00)	Stam 29'; C. López 31' (pen.); Stanković 45', 51'; Crespo 76'		Frick 9'; Colucci 79'; Cossato 88'; Adaílton 90+4'	Stadium: Stadio Olimpico; Attendance: 38,685; Referee: Stefano Farina

28 April 2002 33	Bologna	2–0	Lazio	Bologna
15:00 CEST (UTC+02:00)	Signori 50'; Pecchia 88'			Stadium: Stadio Renato Dall'Ara; Attendance: 28,869; Referee: Fiorenzo Treossi

4 May 2002 34	Lazio	4–2	Internazionale	Rome
15:00 CEST (UTC+02:00)	Poborský 19', 45'; Simeone 55'; S. Inzaghi 73'		Vieri 12'; Di Biagio 24'	Stadium: Stadio Olimpico; Attendance: 75,333; Referee: Gianluca Paparesta

=== Coppa Italia ===
==== Round of 16 ====
11 November 2001 First leg	Lazio	2–1	Siena	Rome
15:00 CET	Crespo 16', 45'		De Cesare 40'	Stadium: Stadio Olimpico; Attendance: 16,200; Referee: Mario Palmieri

28 November 2001 Second leg	Siena	0–1 (1–3 agg.)	Lazio	Siena
20:30 CET			Crespo 24'	Stadium: Stadio Artemio Franchi; Attendance: 7,000; Referee: Paolo Dondarini

==== Quarter-finals ====
10 January 2002 First leg	Milan	2–1	Lazio	Milan
20:45 CET	Simone 22'; Javi Moreno 90+1'	Report	César 45'	Stadium: San Siro; Attendance: 5,391; Referee: Domenico Messina
Note: Match rescheduled from 13 December 2001 due to fog.

16 January 2002 Second leg	Lazio	2–3 (3–5 agg.)	Milan	Rome
20:45 CET	S. Inzaghi 23'; Crespo 75'	Report	José Mari 5'; Javi Moreno 53', 56'	Stadium: Stadio Olimpico; Attendance: 15,000; Referee: Stefano Farina

=== UEFA Champions League ===
==== Third qualifying round ====
8 August 2001 First leg	Copenhagen (Denmark)	2–1	(Italy) Lazio	Copenhagen, Denmark
18:15	Laursen 73' (pen.); Fernandez 85'	Report	Crespo 56'	Stadium: Parken Stadium; Attendance: 37,516; Referee: Nikolai Levnikov (Russia)

21 August 2001 Second leg	Lazio (Italy)	4–1 (5–3 agg.)	(Denmark) Copenhagen	Rome, Italy
21:00	Crespo 48', 63'; López 64'; Fiore 90'	Report	Zuma 81'	Stadium: Stadio Olimpico; Attendance: 37,133; Referee: Hellmut Krug (Germany)

==== Group stage ====
===== Group D =====
Pos	Team	Pld	W	D	L	GF	GA	GD	Pts	Qualification
1	(France) Nantes	6	3	2	1	8	3	+5	11	Advance to second group stage
2	(Turkey) Galatasaray	6	3	1	2	5	4	+1	10	Advance to second group stage
3	(Netherlands) PSV Eindhoven	6	2	1	3	6	9	−3	7	Transfer to UEFA Cup
4	(Italy) Lazio	6	2	0	4	4	7	−3	6	

Source: RSSSF

18 September 2001 1	Galatasaray (Turkey)	1–0	(Italy) Lazio	Istanbul, Turkey
20:45	Ümit Karan 79'	Report		Stadium: Ali Sami Yen Stadium; Attendance: 13,850; Referee: Ryszard Wójcik (Poland)

26 September 2001 2	Lazio (Italy)	1–3	(France) Nantes	Rome, Italy
20:45	Couto 7'	Report	Fabbri 3'; Armand 63'; Ziani 86'	Stadium: Stadio Olimpico; Attendance: 17,798; Referee: Herbert Fandel (Germany)

3 October 2001 3	PSV Eindhoven (Netherlands)	1–0	(Italy) Lazio	Eindhoven, Netherlands
20:45	Hofland 40'	Report		Stadium: Philips Stadion; Attendance: 27,000; Referee: Mike McCurry (Scotland)

23 October 2001 4	Lazio (Italy)	2–1	(Netherlands) PSV Eindhoven	Rome, Italy
20:45	Fiore 39'; López 55' (pen.)	Report	Kežman 56'	Stadium: Stadio Olimpico; Attendance: 18,417; Referee: Antonio López Nieto (Spain)

31 October 2001 5	Lazio (Italy)	1–0	(Turkey) Galatasaray	Rome, Italy
20:45	Stanković 76'	Report		Stadium: Stadio Olimpico; Attendance: 20,363; Referee: Nikolai Levnikov (Russia)

6 November 2001 6	Nantes (France)	1–0	(Italy) Lazio	Nantes, France
20:45	André 72'	Report		Stadium: Stade de la Beaujoire; Attendance: 34,754; Referee: Terje Hauge (Norway)

== Statistics ==
=== Appearances and goals ===
No.	Pos	Nat	Player	Total		Serie A		Coppa		Champions League	
No.	Pos	Nat	Player	Apps	Goals	Apps	Goals	Apps	Goals	Apps	Goals
70	GK	(Italy) ITA	Peruzzi	37	-4	27	0	2	-4	8	0
15	DF	(Italy) ITA	Pancaro	32	1	22+2	1	1	0	5+2	0
13	DF	(Italy) ITA	Nesta	33	0	26	0	1	0	6	0
24	DF	(Portugal) POR	Couto	35	2	29	1	2	0	4	1
19	DF	(Italy) ITA	Favalli	30	0	18+2	0	4	0	5+1	0
20	MF	(Italy) ITA	Fiore	40	5	21+9	3	2	0	8	2
16	MF	(Italy) ITA	Giannichedda	32	0	28	0	0	0	4	0
28	MF	(Italy) ITA	Liverani	28	2	26+1	2	1	0	0	0
5	MF	(Federal Republic of Yugoslavia) YUG	Stankovic	37	8	22+6	7	4	0	1+4	1
9	FW	(Argentina) ARG	Crespo	34	20	22+1	13	4	4	6+1	3
7	FW	(Argentina) ARG	López	39	12	21+9	10	1	0	7+1	2
1	GK	(Italy) ITA	Marchegiani	12	-2	8+2	0	2	-2	0	0
8	MF	(Czech Republic) CZE	Poborsky	35	4	21+7	4	3	0	3+1	0
6	MF	(Spain) ESP	Mendieta	36	2	17+7	1	4	0	7+1	1
18	DF	(Italy) ITA	Negro	26	1	16+1	1	4	0	4+1	0
21	FW	(Italy) ITA	Inzaghi	28	6	14+6	5	2	1	2+4	0
31	DF	(Netherlands) NED	Stam	18	1	13	1	0	0	5	0
3	DF	(Brazil) BRA	César	21	1	9+6	0	3	1	2+1	0
26	MF	(Argentina) ARG	Castroman	13	1	8+3	1	1	0	0+1	0
2	DF	(Italy) ITA	Colonnese	11	0	7+1	0	1	0	1+1	0
4	MF	(Italy) ITA	Baggio	21	0	5+10	0	3	0	2+1	0
14	MF	(Argentina) ARG	Simeone	13	1	3+5	1	0	0	5	0
11	DF	(Federal Republic of Yugoslavia) YUG	Mihajlovic	10	0	2+4	0	2	0	2	0
33	FW	(Italy) ITA	Evacuo	2	0	1+1	0	0	0	0	0
17	DF	(Italy) ITA	Gottardi	8	0	0+5	0	3	0	0	0
23	MF	(Spain) ESP	De la Peña	2	0	0+1	0	1	0	0	0
25	DF	(Italy) ITA	Comazzi	0	0	0	0	0	0	0	0
Players transferred out during the season
9	FW	(Federal Republic of Yugoslavia) YUG	Kovacevic	11	0	3+4	0	1	0	1+2	0
29	FW	(Italy) ITA	Berrettoni	1	0	0+1	0	0	0	0	0

Last updated: 31 May 2002
Source: Competitions
