= Sandreani =

Sandreani is an Italian surname. Notable people with the surname include:

- Alessandro Sandreani (born 1979), Italian footballer and manager, son of Mauro
- Mauro Sandreani (born 1954), Italian footballer and manager
