= Turchetta =

Turchetta is an Italian surname. Notable people with the surname include:

- Alessandro Turchetta (born 1982), Italian footballer
- Gianluca Turchetta (born 1991), Italian footballer
