= Cristante =

Cristante is a surname. Notable people with the surname include:

- Bryan Cristante (born 1995), Italian footballer
- Filippo Cristante (born 1977), Italian footballer and manager
- Hernán Cristante (born 1969), Argentine footballer and manager
- Leo Cristante (1926–1977), American baseball player
