= Federico Gerardi =

Italian footballer

Personal information
- Date of birth: 10 December 1987 (age 38)
- Place of birth: Pordenone, Italy
- Height: 1.84 m (6 ft 0 in)
- Position: Striker

Team information
- Current team: Bassano

Youth career
- Venezia
- 2005–2006: Udinese

Senior career*
Years	Team	Apps	(Gls)
2006–2013	Udinese	1	(0)
2007	→ Pistoiese (loan)	0	(0)
2007–2008	→ Monza (loan)	7	(0)
2008	→ Sangiovannese (loan)	14	(4)
2008–2009	→ Salernitana (loan)	10	(1)
2009	→ Cittadella (loan)	16	(2)
2009–2010	→ Ancona (loan)	20	(2)
2010–2011	→ PortoSummaga (loan)	37	(6)
2011	→ Grosseto (loan)	15	(0)
2012	→ Ascoli (loan)	15	(2)
2013–2014	Reggina	50	(12)
2014–2015	Cittadella	32	(7)
2015–2016	Como	27	(1)
2016–2017	Feralpisalò	31	(8)
2017–2018	Pordenone	25	(7)
2018–2019	Monopoli	33	(7)
2019–2020	Rimini	25	(5)
2020–2021	Gubbio	14	(3)
2021	Cavese	15	(3)
2021–2023	Picerno	41	(7)
2023	Vis Pesaro	12	(0)
2023–	Bassano	2	(2)
- * Club domestic league appearances and goals as of 17 September 2023

Federico Gerardi (born 10 December 1987) is an Italian footballer who plays as a striker for Serie D club Bassano.

== Career ==
Born in Pordenone, in the Friuli-Venezia Giulia region, Gerardi started his career 65 km away at Venezia of Venice, Veneto. Due to bankruptcy of Venezia, he joined Udinese Primavera Team in August 2005, which is in Udine, Friuli-Venezia Giulia region and a historic regional capital. He then spent 5 1/3 seasons on loan to lower divisions, started in January 2007.

In January 2013 he was sold to Reggina Calcio.

On 8 July 2014 he was signed by Cittadella in a 2-year contract.

On 29 July 2019 he joined Rimini.

On 19 October 2020 he moved to Gubbio. On 29 January 2021 he signed with Cavese. On 31 August 2021 he joined Picerno.

On 19 January 2023, Gerardi signed with Vis Pesaro.
