= Carmine Palumbo =

Italian footballer (born 1993)

Personal information
- Date of birth: 18 April 1993 (age 33)
- Place of birth: Naples, Italy
- Height: 1.80 m (5 ft 11 in)
- Position: Midfielder

Youth career
- –2006: Polisportiva Boys Melito
- –2008: Napoli
- 2010–2011: Neapolis

Senior career*
Years	Team	Apps	(Gls)
2011–2012	Neapolis	13	(0)
2012–2014	Lecce	2	(0)
2013	→ Pro Patria (loan)	0	(0)
2014	→ Cremonese (loan)	0	(0)
2016	Progreditur Marcianise	4	(0)
2016	Aversa Normanna	5	(0)
2016–2017	Albanova Calcio		
2017	Aversa Normanna	6	(0)
2018–2020	San Giorgio		
2020–2021	USD Palmese		
2021	ASSC Ercolanese		
2021–2025	ASD Napoli Nord		
- * Club domestic league appearances and goals as of 9 October 2026

Carmine Palumbo (born 18 April 1993) is an Italian footballer who plays as a midfielder.

== Biography ==
=== Naples clubs ===
Born in Naples (Italian: Napoli), Campania, Palumbo spent his early career in the cities and towns of the Province of Naples, such as Naples, Melito di Napoli and Mugnano di Napoli. Palumbo was released by Boys Melito in ca. January 2006. He then joined S.S.C. Napoli, which he was a player of the under-15 team in 2007–08 season. He was a player for the reserve team of Neapolis Mugnano in 2010–11 season. He was a player for the first team in 2011–12 Lega Pro Seconda Divisione, the last and fourth level of Italian professional football league system (until 2014). The club relegated in 2012, thus Palumbo became a free agent.

=== Lecce ===
In 2012, he was signed by Serie B club Lecce, which the club was expelled from Serie B and readmitted to Lega Pro Prime Division at the start of season due to 2011 Italian football scandal. He played 2 times in the third level of Italian football until January 2013. He was loaned to the fourth division club Pro Patria on 31 January 2013. He did not play any game for the champion of the group A of L.P. 2nd Division. He was an unused bench in 2013 Lega Pro 2nd Division Supercup, losing to Salernitana, champion of group B of the same division.

On 2 September 2013 he was signed by Cremonese in temporary deal, with Simone Sales moved to opposite direction.

Palumbo played for the Lombard club in Lega Pro Cup. He was suspended in the first match of the round of 12 (quarter-finals). Palumbo did not play in the semi-finals, which the club lost 2–4 in aggregate to Monza.

=== Later career ===
In January 2018, Palumbo moved to San Giorgio. Two years later, he joined U.S.D. Palmese.
