= Desiderio Garufo =

Italian footballer (born 1987)

Personal information
- Full name: Desiderio Michele Garufo
- Date of birth: 22 April 1987 (age 39)
- Place of birth: Grotte, Italy
- Height: 1.76 m (5 ft 9 in)
- Positions: Right-back; winger

Team information
- Current team: Akragas
- Number: 4

Senior career*
Years	Team	Apps	(Gls)
2007–2009	Nissa		
2009–2010	Sangiovannese	33	(3)
2010–2012	Taranto	52	(1)
2012–2013	Nocerina	26	(3)
2013–2014	Trapani	33	(0)
2014–2015	Novara	25	(1)
2015–2016	Catania	24	(0)
2016–2018	Parma	8	(0)
2018–2019	Trapani	9	(0)
2019–2021	Reggina	22	(1)
2020–2021	→ Catanzaro (loan)	24	(1)
2021–2022	Canicattì		
2022–2023	Akragas		
2023	Pro Favara		
2023–	Akragas	2	(0)
- * Club domestic league appearances and goals as of 20 December 2023

Desiderio Michele Garufo (born 22 April 1987) is an Italian professional footballer who plays for Serie D club Akragas.

== Biography ==
Born in Grotte, Sicily, Garufo started his career at Nissa. He won Eccellenza Sicily with team in 2008 (Italian sixth level until 2014). Garufo scored 10 goals in 2008–09 Serie D, Italian fifth level and top level of amateur football. In 2009 Garufo was signed by Lega Pro 2nd Division club Sangiovannese (Italian fourth level). The club was the losing side of the promotion playoffs. Garufo was a substitute and starting right midfielder in 4-3-2-1 formation respectively.

=== Taranto ===
Garufo moved to Italian third level for Taranto in 2010. The club entered the promotion playoffs, losing to Atletico Roma. Garufo was the wingback in the 3-4-3 formation in the first leg.

Garufo remained for the club for 2011–12 season. However the club folded despite finished as the losing side of promotion playoffs again.

=== Nocerina ===
On 3 July 2012, he was signed by another third division club Nocerina. The club also finished as the losing side of promotion playoffs of 2012–13 L.P. Prime Div. season. Garufo was the right-back and right midfielder respectively in 4-3-3 formation in the first and second legs.

=== Trapani ===
On 1 July 2013, Garufo was signed by Serie B club Trapani on a free transfer. He wore the number 2 shirt. Garufo made his competitive debut for the club in Italian Cup as right-back.

=== Novara ===
On 1 August 2014, Garufo was signed by Lega Pro club Novara in a two-year contract. After the club promoted to Serie B, Garufo wore the number 17 shirt, the traditional back luck number. He did not play in the opening match of 2015–16 Serie B. On 16 September he was sold back to Lega Pro, the third division of Italian football pyramid.

=== Catania ===
On 16 September 2015, Garufo and Bergamelli were sold to Catania in two-year contracts. He played 23 games for the club in Lega Pro C, contributing with 4 assists. He also featured in one game in the Italian Cup.

=== Parma ===
On 13 July 2016, Garufo was signed on a free transfer by Parma in a two-year contract. He was assigned the number 15 shirt. He made his debut on 7 August 2016 in a Coppa Italia Lega Pro game against Piacenza, playing as a right midfielder in a 3-5-2 formation.

=== Trapani ===
On 29 August 2018, he re-joined Trapani on a free transfer.

=== Reggina ===
On 21 August 2019, he signed a one-year contract with Reggina.

=== Catanzaro ===
On 29 September 2020, he moved to Serie C club Catanzaro. Catanzaro reported the transfer as a loan, while Reggina reported a permanent transfer.

=== Canicattì ===
On 8 October 2021, he joined an amateur side Canicattì.
