= Felice Evacuo =

Italian footballer

Personal information
- Date of birth: 23 August 1982 (age 44)
- Place of birth: Pompei, Italy
- Height: 1.87 m (6 ft 2 in)
- Position: Forward

Youth career
- 1998–1999: Turris

Senior career*
| Years | Team | Apps | (Gls) |
| 1999–2001 | Turris | 11 | (1) |
| 2001–2003 | Lazio | 2 | (0) |
| 2002–2003 | → Fiorentina (loan) | 20 | (2) |
| 2003–2004 | Viterbese | 21 | (5) |
| 2004–2007 | Avellino | 64 | (23) |
| 2005–2006 | → Torres (loan) | 33 | (16) |
| 2007–2008 | Frosinone | 40 | (13) |
| 2008–2011 | Benevento | 67 | (32) |
| 2011–2012 | Spezia | 31 | (16) |
| 2012–2013 | Nocerina | 16 | (10) |
| 2013–2014 | Benevento | 29 | (16) |
| 2014–2016 | Novara | 73 | (29) |
| 2016–2017 | Parma | 19 | (5) |
| 2017 | → Alessandria (loan) | 13 | (2) |
| 2017–2020 | Trapani | 86 | (22) |
| 2020–2021 | Catanzaro | 34 | (5) |
| 2021–2022 | Juve Stabia | 26 | (3) |

International career
| 2002 | Italy U20 | 2 | (0) |
- * Club domestic league appearances and goals

Felice Evacuo (born 23 August 1982) is an Italian former footballer who played as a forward.

== Career ==
=== Early career ===
Born in Pompei, the Province of Naples, Evacuo started his professional career at Serie C1 side Turris. In the 2001–2002 season, he joined Lazio and played in their youth team. Evacuo played his first Serie A match on 27 January 2002, replacing Stefano Fiore in the 77th minute, resulting in defeat to Torino 1-0. He played another match as starter on 17 March, but was replaced by Claudio López at half time.

During the 2002–2003 season, he left for newly founded Florentia Viola on loan, where he played 20 league matches for La Viola in Serie C2. In the 2003–2004 season, he played for Serie C1 side Viterbese.

=== Avellino ===
In summer 2004, he left for Serie C1 side Avellino, scoring 8 league goals and winning promotion playoffs to Serie B. He played once at Serie B before leaving for Serie C1 side Torres. In the 2006–2007 season, he returned to Avellino, which reverted back to Serie C1 in June 2006. He won promotion playoffs again and scored 15 goals.

=== Frosinone & Benevento ===
In July 2007, he signed a three-year contract with Frosinone. He was the second team-top-scorer behind Francesco Lodi. But in August 2008, he left for Prima Divisione side Benevento.

=== Novara ===
On 9 July 2014, Evacuo permanently moved to Novara for a transfer fee of approximately €700,000. On 10 May 2015, Novara won the Lega Pro championship and was promoted to Serie B; this victory followed the Lega Pro Super Cup.

=== Parma and Alessandria ===
On 6 July 2016, he moved to Parma, a newly promoted team in the Lega Pro, signing a two-year contract. On 30 January 2017, Evacuo transferred to Alessandria with temporary annual on loan until 30 June 2017.

=== Trapani ===
In the summer of 2017, he left Alessandria for Trapani, another Serie C club. With Trapani, he achieved a promotion to Serie B after winning the 2018–19 Serie C playoffs.

=== Catanzaro ===
On 5 October 2020, he joined Catanzaro in Serie C.

=== Juve Stabia ===
On 8 September 2021, he signed with Juve Stabia.

== Career statistics ==
As of match played 24 April 2022

Appearances and goals by club, season and competition
| Club | Season | League | | | National Cup | | Other | | Total | |
| Club | Season | Division | Apps | Goals | Apps | Goals | Apps | Goals | Apps | Goals |
|---|---|---|---|---|---|---|---|---|---|---|
| Turris | 2000–01 | Serie C2 | 10 | 1 | 0 | 0 | — | | 10 | 1 |
| Lazio | 2001–02 | Serie A | 2 | 0 | 0 | 0 | — | | 2 | 0 |
| Fiorentina (loan) | 2002–03 | Serie C2 | 20 | 2 | 0 | 0 | — | | 20 | 2 |
| Viterbese | 2003–04 | Serie C1 | 21 | 5 | 0 | 0 | 2 (Note: Appearance(s) in Promotion Playoffs) | 0 | 23 | 5 |
| Avellino | 2004–05 | Serie C1 | 32 | 8 | 0 | 0 | 3 | 0 | 35 | 8 |
| Avellino | 2005–06 | Serie B | 1 | 0 | 1 | 0 | — | | 2 | 0 |
| Avellino | 2006–07 | Serie C1 | 31 | 15 | 1 | 1 | 3 | 1 | 35 | 17 |
| Avellino | Total | | 64 | 23 | 2 | 1 | 6 | 1 | 72 | 25 |
| Torres (loan) | 2005–06 | Serie C1 | 33 | 16 | — | | 2 | 0 | 35 | 16 |
| Frosinone | 2007–08 | Serie B | 40 | 13 | 1 | 0 | — | | 41 | 13 |
| Benevento | 2008–09 | Lega Pro | 16 | 5 | 3 | 3 | 1 | 0 | 20 | 8 |
| Benevento | 2009–10 | Lega Pro | 23 | 15 | 2 | 1 | 2 | 1 | 27 | 17 |
| Benevento | 2010–11 | Lega Pro | 28 | 12 | 2 | 5 | 2 | 1 | 32 | 18 |
| Benevento | Total | | 67 | 32 | 7 | 9 | 5 | 2 | 79 | 43 |
| Spezia | 2011–12 | Lega Pro | 31 | 16 | 2 | 1 | — | | 33 | 17 |
| Spezia | 2012–13 | Serie B | 0 | 0 | 1 | 2 | — | | 1 | 2 |
| Spezia | Total | | 31 | 16 | 3 | 3 | 0 | 0 | 34 | 19 |
| Nocerina | 2012–13 | Lega Pro | 16 | 10 | 0 | 0 | 2 | 0 | 18 | 10 |
| Benevento | 2013–14 | Lega Pro | 29 | 16 | 0 | 0 | 3 | 0 | 32 | 16 |
| Novara | 2014–15 | Lega Pro | 37 | 16 | 1 | 0 | — | | 38 | 16 |
| Novara | 2015–16 | Serie B | 36 | 13 | 2 | 2 | 3 | 0 | 41 | 15 |
| Novara | Total | | 73 | 29 | 3 | 2 | 3 | 0 | 79 | 31 |
| Parma | 2016–17 | Lega Pro | 19 | 5 | — | | — | | 19 | 5 |
| Parma | 2017–18 | Serie B | 0 | 0 | 0 | 0 | — | | 0 | 0 |
| Parma | Total | | 19 | 5 | 0 | 0 | 0 | 0 | 19 | 5 |
| Alessandria (loan) | 2016–17 | Lega Pro | 13 | 2 | — | | 4 | 0 | 17 | 2 |
| Trapani | 2017–18 | Serie C | 32 | 10 | — | | 1 | 0 | 33 | 10 |
| Trapani | 2018–19 | Serie C | 35 | 10 | 2 | 2 | 3 | 0 | 40 | 12 |
| Trapani | 2019–20 | Serie B | 19 | 2 | 2 | 2 | — | | 21 | 4 |
| Trapani | Total | | 86 | 22 | 4 | 4 | 4 | 0 | 94 | 26 |
| Catanzaro | 2020–21 | Serie C | 34 | 5 | 1 | 0 | 2 | 0 | 37 | 5 |
| Juve Stabia | 2021–22 | Serie C | 28 | 3 | — | | — | | 28 | 3 |
| Career total | | | 586 | 200 | 21 | 19 | 33 | 3 | 640 | 222 |

== Honours ==
Fiorentina

- Serie C2: 2003 (Group B)

Spezia

- Supercoppa di Serie C: 2012

Novara

- Supercoppa di Serie C: 2015

Individual

- Coppa Italia Co-Top Goalscorer (5 goals): 2010–11
