= Emiliano Tarana =

Italian footballer (born 1979)

Personal information
- Date of birth: 3 January 1979 (age 47)
- Place of birth: Casalmaggiore, Italy
- Height: 1.78 m (5 ft 10 in)
- Position: Midfielder

Youth career
- Parma

Senior career*
Years	Team	Apps	(Gls)
1999–2003	Parma	0	(0)
1999–2000	→ Arezzo (loan)	32	(4)
2000	→ Ternana (loan)	7	(0)
2001	→ Perugia (loan)	3	(0)
2001–2002	→ Modena (loan)	17	(1)
2002–2003	→ Ancona (loan)	33	(2)
2003–2005	Piacenza	52	(5)
2005–2010	Mantova	190	(17)
2010–2011	Portosummaga	38	(3)
2011–2013	Feralpisalò	60	(14)
2013–2016	Lentigione		
- * Club domestic league appearances and goals

Emiliano Tarana (born 3 January 1979) is an Italian former footballer.

== Career ==
Tarana started his career at Parma, about 21 km away from hometown Casalmaggiore. He spent 4 seasons on loan to various clubs before signed permanently by Piacenza in July 2003. In January 2005, he left for his current club Mantova, at that time at Serie C1.

On 16 August 2011, he signed a two-year contract with Feralpisalò.
