= Nicola Madonna =

Italian footballer

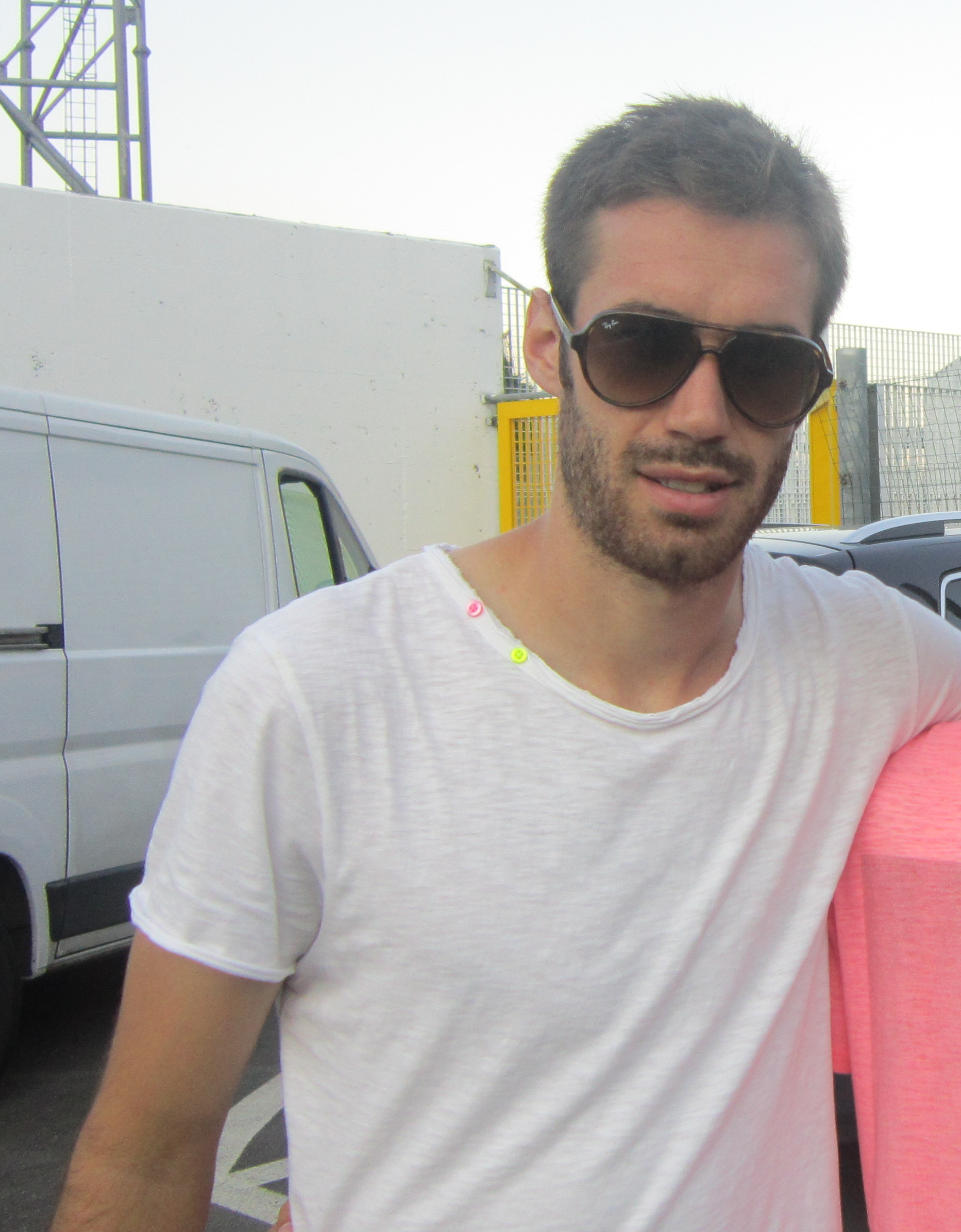

Personal information
- Date of birth: 31 October 1986 (age 40)
- Place of birth: Alzano Lombardo, Italy
- Height: 1.82 m (5 ft 11 1/2 in)
- Position: Midfielder

Youth career
- Alzano
- 2002–2005: Atalanta

Senior career*
Years	Team	Apps	(Gls)
2005–2009	AlbinoLeffe	86	(9)
2009–2011	Atalanta	8	(0)
2010	→ Vicenza (loan)	13	(2)
2011–2016	Spezia	92	(6)
2015–2016	→ Como (loan)	24	(1)
2016–2019	Padova	52	(3)
2019–2021	Giana Erminio	36	(3)
- * Club domestic league appearances and goals as of 2 May 2021

Nicola Madonna (born 31 October 1986) is an Italian footballer who plays as a midfielder.

== Club career ==
Madonna and Daniel Bombardieri joined AlbinoLeffe in a joint-ownership bid for €100,000 each. AlbinoLeffe got full ownership from Atalanta by blind auction between club in June 2006, for €110,000 and €11,000 respectively. He played 81 games for AlbinoLeffe at Serie B, plus 3 more appearances at 2007-08 promotion playoffs.

In summer 2009 he was re-signed by Atalanta in joint-ownership bid for €550,000 (exchanged with Michael Cia and Dario Bergamelli for the same price) but after a poor half season, on 1 February 2010 loaned to Vicenza.

After this loan, Madonna returned to Atalanta, and played only 1 match in a whole season. In June 2011 Atalanta acquired Madonna outright for a peppercorn of €1,500 and sold Bergamelli, Cia and Karamoko Cissé for €500 each. After this unsuccessful season with the Dea, he was moved to Spezia Calcio in July 2011, initially in temporary deal. At the end of season he was signed by co-ownership deal for €250,000. The co-ownership was renewed in 2013 and again in 2014.

On 11 October 2019 he joined Serie C club Giana Erminio until the end of the season.

=== Personal life ===
He is the son of Armando Madonna, head coach of AlbinoLeffe, Piacenza and Livorno.
