= Mauro Sandreani =

Italian football player and manager (born 1954)

Personal information
- Date of birth: 26 September 1954 (age 72)
- Place of birth: Rome, Italy
- Height: 1.72 m (5 ft 8 in)
- Positions: Defender; midfielder

Senior career*
| Years | Team | Apps | (Gls) |
| 1973–1977 | Roma | 31 | (0) |
| 1977–1978 | L.R. Vicenza | 0 | (0) |
| 1978–1979 | Genoa | 22 | (2) |
| 1979–1981 | L.R. Vicenza | 56 | (0) |
| 1981–1982 | Modena | 9 | (0) |
| 1982–1983 | Fano | 25 | (0) |
| 1983–1984 | Rimini | 19 | (0) |
| 1986–1987 | Vis Pesaro | 25 | (0) |
| Total | | 187 | (2) |

Managerial career
- 1992–1996: Padova
- 1996–1997: Torino
- 1997–1998: Ravenna
- 1998–1999: Empoli
- 1999: Tenerife
- 2001: Treviso
- * Club domestic league appearances and goals

Mauro Sandreani (born 26 September 1954) is an Italian former professional football player and coach.

== Playing career ==
Born in Rome, Sandreani spent three seasons in the Serie A with Roma, gaining 31 appearances and no goals. His playing career was cut short by serious injuries.

== Coaching career ==
In his coaching career, Sandreani led Padova to promotion to Serie A in 1994, where they spent two seasons, and managed Empoli in the Serie A in the 1998–99 season, failing to avoid relegation.

Sandreani managed Segunda Division side Tenerife.

== Outside football ==
Sandreani's voice is used for commentary in the Italian version of the Konami computer game Pro Evolution Soccer 2008.

== Personal life ==
Mauro is the father of the football player Alessandro Sandreani.
