= Mariano Romano =

Italian footballer

Personal information
- Date of birth: 7 July 1989 (age 37)
- Place of birth: Naples, Italy
- Height: 1.76 m (5 ft 9 in)
- Position: Midfielder

Youth career
- Siena

Senior career*
Years	Team	Apps	(Gls)
2009–2012	Siena	0	(0)
2009–2010	→ Sassuolo (loan)	1	(0)
2010	→ Pergocrema (loan)	5	(0)
2010–2011	→ South Tyrol (loan)	29	(0)
2011–2012	→ Monza (loan)	27	(1)
2012–2013	Paganese	1	(0)
2013–2014	Vigor Lamezia	28	(0)
2014	Fondi	7	(0)
2014–2015	Termoli	18	(2)
2015–2016	Monopoli	31	(4)
2016	Monterosi FC	6	(0)
2016–2017	Vastese	8	(0)
2017–2018	Aversa Normanna	13	(0)
Total		174	(7)
- * Club domestic league appearances and goals

Mariano Romano (born 7 July 1989) is an Italian former footballer who plays as a midfielder.

== Biography ==
Born in Naples, Campania, Romano started his career at Tuscany side Siena. On 3 July 2009, he was loaned to Serie B side Sassuolo with option to co-own the player in June 2010.

On 21 January 2010, he was loaned to Pergocrema of Lega Pro Prima Divisione. which he already trained with the team since 2 January.

On 9 July 2010, Romano remained at Prima Divisione, but for newly promoted side South Tyrol. Siena teammate Thomas Albanese also joined him on loan.

On 15 July 2011 Romano, Mihail Ivanov, Reyza Soudant and Saverio Cutrupi were signed by Atletico Roma F.C. On 31 August 2011 he joined Monza.

=== Representative team ===
In Although made a few appearances for Sassuolo, he played once for Italy under-21 Serie B representative team in an internal training match.
