= Eduardo Carloto =

Brazilian footballer (born 1981)

Personal information
- Full name: Eduardo Luís Carloto
- Date of birth: 4 April 1981 (age 45)
- Place of birth: Curitiba, Brazil
- Height: 1.76 m (5 ft 9 in)
- Position: Midfielder

Team information
- Current team: Unione Venezia

Youth career
- 1999–2000: Internazionale

Senior career*
Years	Team	Apps	(Gls)
2001–2004	→ Treviso (loan)	0	(0)
2001–2002	→ Fanfulla (loan)	29	(1)
2002–2003	→ Paternò (loan)	28	(0)
2003–2004	→ Vis Pesaro (loan)	18	(0)
2004	→ Südtirol (loan)	10	(1)
2004–2005	→ Giugliano	28	(0)
2005–2006	Carpenedolo	16	(0)
2006–2007	Benevento	16	(0)
2007–2008	Lucchese	30	(4)
2008–2011	Perugia	75	(4)
2011–2013	Unione Venezia	37	(2)
- * Club domestic league appearances and goals

Eduardo Luís Carloto (born 4 April 1981) is a Brazilian footballer. He spent his professional career at Italian Lega Pro (3rd & 4th highest division).

== Biography ==
Carloto started his Italy career at Internazionale then Treviso.

In 2002–03 season he left for Serie D side Fanfulla then played for Serie C1 side Paternò. In July 2004 Treviso bought him back and sent him to Vis Pesaro in co-ownership deal. In January 2005 he left for FC South Tyrol.

In 2005–06 season he left for Serie C2 club Giugliano then Carpenedolo of Serie C2 Group A. In January 2007 he left for Benevento of Serie C2 Group C, helping promote the team to Serie C1 scoring 4 goals. After limited chances in 2008, he left for Serie D side Lucchese in December 2008. He helped the team be promoted back to Prima Divisione and made 30 appearances in 2009–10 season (3 in Cup) scoring 2 goals in the domestic league.

In August 2011 he left for Perugia.

On 3 January 2013, he signed for Unione Venezia.

== Honours ==
- Seconda Divisione: 2007–08
- Serie D: 2008–09
- Seconda Divisione: 2009–10
- Supercoppa di Lega: 2010
