= Marco Guidone =

Italian footballer

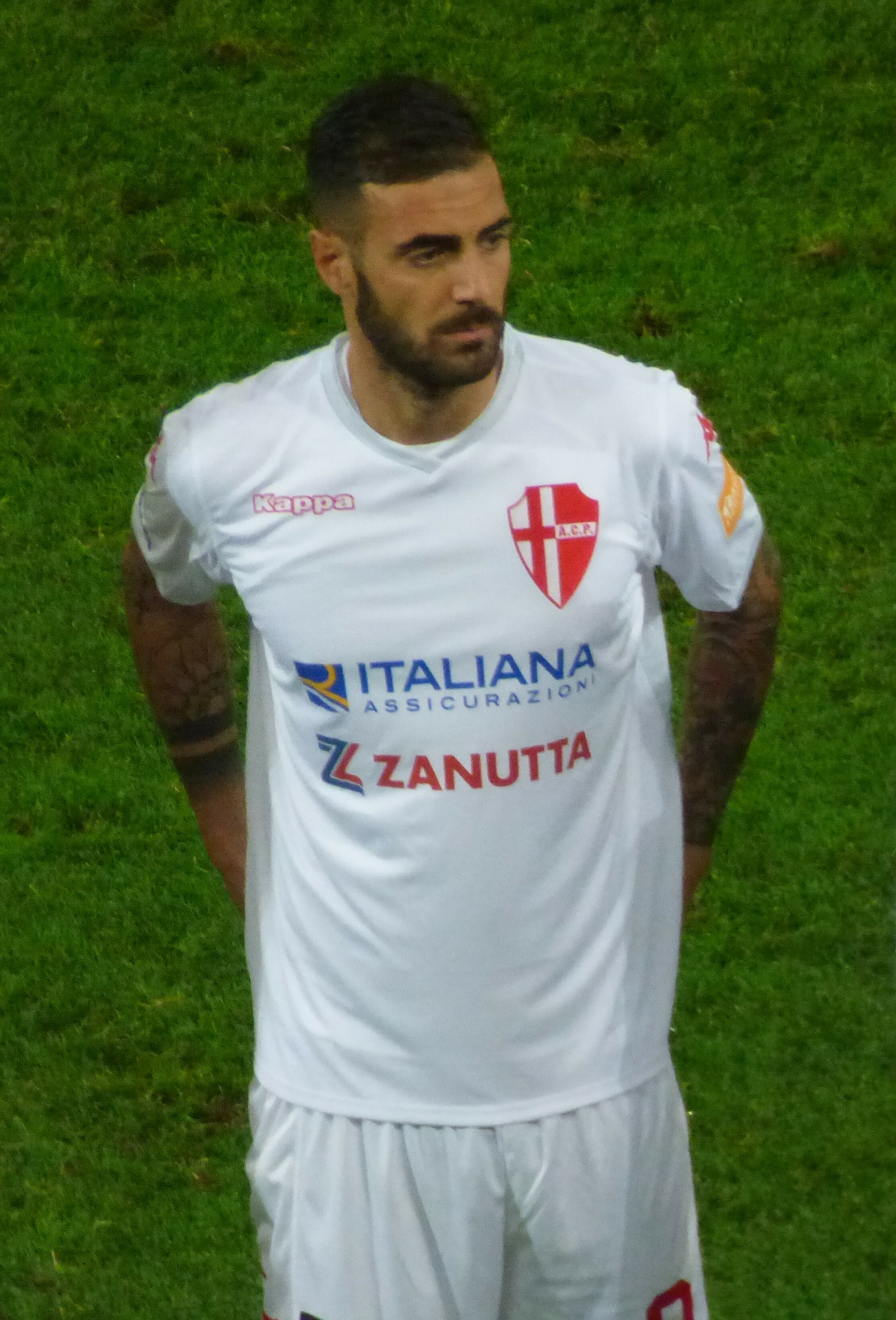
- Guidone in 2018

Personal information
- Date of birth: 17 May 1986 (age 40)
- Place of birth: Monza, Italy
- Height: 1.90 m (6 ft 3 in)
- Position: Forward

Team information
- Current team: Cittadella Vis Modena
- Number: 17

Youth career
- Milan
- Monza

Senior career*
| Years | Team | Apps | (Gls) |
| 2005–2007 | Monza | 6 | (0) |
| 2007 | → Catanzaro (loan) | 9 | (2) |
| 2007 | → Melfi (loan) | 5 | (0) |
| 2008 | → Sansovino (loan) | 10 | (0) |
| 2008–2009 | Verviétois | 30 | (17) |
| 2009–2010 | Carrarese | 27 | (12) |
| 2010–2011 | Grosseto | 17 | (4) |
| 2011 | → Pisa (loan) | 14 | (2) |
| 2011–2012 | → Foligno (loan) | 33 | (4) |
| 2012–2013 | Fondi | 32 | (11) |
| 2013–2014 | Chieti | 33 | (13) |
| 2014–2016 | Santarcangelo | 71 | (23) |
| 2016–2017 | Reggiana | 41 | (11) |
| 2017–2019 | Padova | 37 | (9) |
| 2019 | → Vis Pesaro (loan) | 18 | (3) |
| 2019–2021 | Siena | 60 | (23) |
| 2021–2023 | Ravenna | 73 | (32) |
| 2023–2024 | Clivense | 16 | (3) |
| 2024– | Cittadella Vis Modena | 34 | (14) |
- * Club domestic league appearances and goals as of 17 November 2024

Marco Guidone (born 17 May 1986) is an Italian football forward who plays for Serie D club Cittadella Vis Modena.

== Club career ==
Guidone has previously played for Monza, Catanzaro, Melfi, Sansovino, as well as Royal Cercle Sportif Verviétois, Belgium and known as ‘Le Luca Toni verviétois’. He was successively signed by Carrarese in August 2009 as a free agent. He left Carrarese in August 2010 and joined Grosseto, Serie B. At the end of January 2011 moved to Pisa on loan. In August 2011 joined Foligno on loan. In September 2012 he signed for Fondi. In August 2013 he left Fondi for Chieti. In July 2014 he signed for Santarcangelo. After two year with Santarcangelo, Guidone signed for Reggiana for free. In August 2017 he left Reggiana and was signed by Padova.

On 17 January 2019, he joined Vis Pesaro on loan.

On 8 August 2019, he signed a two-year contract with Siena.

On 22 July 2021, he joined Ravenna in Serie D.
