= Emanuele Berrettoni =

Italian footballer (born 1981)

Personal information
- Date of birth: 17 May 1981 (age 45)
- Place of birth: Rome, Italy
- Height: 1.72 m (5 ft 8 in)
- Position: Striker

Senior career*
Years	Team	Apps	(Gls)
1998–2001	Lazio	1	(0)
2001–2003	Perugia	30	(0)
2004	Catania	16	(3)
2004	Crotone	1	(0)
2004	Napoli	13	(0)
2005	SPAL	15	(0)
2005	Grosseto	11	(0)
2006–2009	Bassano Virtus	111	(45)
2009–2012	Verona	87	(13)
2012–2014	Bassano Virtus	68	(23)
2014–2016	Ascoli	33	(6)
2016–2019	Pordenone	96	(18)

International career
2001–2002	Italy U-20	6	(1)
- * Club domestic league appearances and goals

Emanuele Berrettoni (born 17 May 1981) is a former Italian football player.

== Club career ==
He played 4 seasons (31 games, no goals) in the Serie A for S.S. Lazio and Perugia Calcio.

He played one game in the 2000–01 UEFA Champions League for S.S. Lazio (on 7 November 2000 against Sparta Prague) and scored a goal in the 2002 UEFA Intertoto Cup for Perugia Calcio against VfB Stuttgart.

In June 2009 he was signed by Verona.

From 2012 to 2014 plays in the Bassano Virtus; then he moved to Ascoli with which he was promoted to Serie B. In January 2016 back in the Lega Pro signing for Pordenone.

He retired at the end of the 2018–19 season.

== Honours ==
Perugia

- UEFA Intertoto Cup: 2003
