= Francesco Rossi (footballer, born 1977) =

Italian footballer

Personal information
- Date of birth: 31 August 1977 (age 49)
- Place of birth: Portogruaro, Italy
- Height: 1.80 m (5 ft 11 in)
- Position: Goalkeeper

Youth career
- –1997: Chievo

Senior career*
Years	Team	Apps	(Gls)
1995–2000	Chievo	1	(0)
1997–1998	→ Sassari Torres (loan)	28	(0)
1998–1999	→ Tempio (loan)	34	(0)
1999–2000	→ US Brescello (loan)	5	(0)
2000–2001	Fasano	31	(0)
2001–2002	Siena	0	(0)
2002–2004	Foggia	41	(0)
2004–2006	Grosseto	70	(0)
2006–2007	Cisco Roma	29	(0)
2007–2008	Gallipoli	32	(0)
2008–2012	Portogruaro	106	(0)
2015–2016	Liventina 1954	19	(0)
Total		396	(0)
- * Club domestic league appearances and goals

Francesco Rossi (born 31 August 1977) is an Italian former footballer who plays as a goalkeeper.

== Career ==
=== Chievo and early career ===
Born in Portogruaro, Veneto, (some reported in Motta di Livenza, a town 20 km away), Rossi started his professional career at A.C. ChievoVerona, a Veneto team based in Verona. He played his only league match for Chievo on round 38 (last round) of 1994–95 Serie B, as starting keeper. That season he was the backup of Marco Borghetto and Enzo Zanin, but in the round 37, Chievo already secured a place for next season as mathematically had higher points than Acireale.

After graduating from the youth team at the age of 20, he spent 3 seasons in 3 different Serie C teams, namely Sassari Torres, Tempio and Brescello. The latter one was a Serie C1 team, where he only played 5 times as the understudy of Andrea Sardini.

He was sold to Serie C2 club Fasano in 2000 in co-ownership deal, where he brought his usual performance in that league, played 31 times. In June 2001, despite both clubs failed to form an agreement, Chievo bought back Rossi by made a higher bid in the auction mechanism set up by FIGC. That season (2000–01 Serie B), Chievo also won promotion to Serie A.

However at the start of season he left for fellow top division club Siena, rejoining former Chievo teammate Matteo Gianello. Rossi was an understudy of Gianello and Sebastián Cejas since January 2002.

=== Foggia ===
Rossi was sold to another Serie C2 team Foggia in 2002 to seek regular place. He won the Group C champion as an understudy of Antonio Efficie. However, he became the starting keeper in 2003–04 Serie C1. Once again Chievo bought him back along with defender Tommaso Chiecchi.

=== Grosseto ===
Chievo bought back Rossi in June 2004 but soon sold him to Grosseto in another co-ownership deal, where he spent 2 Serie C1 seasons as starting keeper. The team entered promotion playoffs in 2005 and 2006, losing both. Chievo also tried to buy back Rossi in June 2005, this time losing in the blind auction mechanism. Rossi played 36 games in 2004–05 season, conceded 17 goals only, an average of 0.47 goals per games, which was his career record.

He then left for Cisco Roma in 2006, and Grosseto tried another keepers Luca Anania and Angelo Pagotto (eventually promoted).

=== Cisco Roma and Gallipoli ===
Rossi was signed by Serie C2 club Cisco Roma in 2006. Rossi entered playoffs phase for the third successive year, but again losing it with the team. Reggiana won Cisco Roma in 2–0 in aggregate in the first round (semi-final) of the playoffs. Before the playoffs Cisco Roma conceded second less goals in Group B, only two more than the group champion Foligno (22 goals). Rossi played 29 games of the league, conceded 18 goals, an average of 0.62 goals per games.

In 2007, he left for Serie C1 club Gallipoli. The team finished as the ninth of Group B, with worst goal conceded (44 goals) among the mid-table (6th to 13th place). Rossi played 32 games of them, conceded 39 goals, nearly a double compared to the last season. At the end of season he left the club.

=== Portogruaro ===
Rossi returned to Veneto in 2008, for Calcio Portogruaro Summaga. He was the starting keeper of the team in the first three seasons, winning Group B of Lega Pro Prima Divisione (ex- Serie C1) but losing the Supercoppa di Lega di Prima Divisione against the Group A champion in 2010. Portogruaro ranked fifth in goal conceded (26 goals) counting from the bottom in 2009–10 season. The team also had 15 clean sheet, ranked equal fourth. However, in the maiden Serie B season of Portogruaro and "second" Serie B season for Rossi, the team conceded the third most goals and poor goal scoring, made the team relegated just 1 season.

In 2011–12 season, new coach Massimo Rastelli preferred Andrea Bavena as new starting keeper, with Michele Mion occupied the bench except the only cup match.

=== Later career ===
After a spell with Cornuda Crocetta 1920, 37-year old Rossi returned to Serie D and joined ASD Liventina in the summer 2015. He left the club at the end of the season and later joined USD EuroMarosticense in the autumn 2016 where he played for the rest of the year.

In December 2019, Rossi joined APD Vigor in the Seconda Categoria at the age of 42.

== Honours ==
Foggia

- Lega Pro Seconda Divisione: 2003

Portogruaro

- Lega Pro Prima Divisione: 2010
