= Stefano Pondaco =

Italian footballer

Personal information
- Date of birth: May 4, 1989 (age 37)
- Place of birth: Vibo Valentia, Italy
- Height: 1.82 m (6 ft 0 in)
- Position: Left midfielder

Team information
- Current team: Nessuno

Youth career
- Sampdoria

Senior career*
Years	Team	Apps	(Gls)
2009–2013	Portogruaro	65	(3)
2010–2011	→ Lucchese (loan)	4	(0)
2011	→ Virtus Entella (loan)	8	(0)
2013–2015	Mantova	36	(0)
2016	US Fezzanese	36	(4)
2018	Rapallo Ruentes 1914		
2018–2019	Sestri Levante	21	(2)
2019–	Ligorna 1922	15	(0)
- * Club domestic league appearances and goals as of 21:07, 18 February 2020 (UTC)

Stefano Pondaco (born May 4, 1989, in Vibo Valentia) is an Italian professional football player currently playing for Serie D club SCD Ligorna 1922.

== Career ==
=== Ligorna 1922 ===
Ahead of the 2019–20 season, Pondaco joined Serie D club SCD Ligorna 1922.
