= Manuel Turchi =

Italian footballer

Personal information
- Date of birth: 27 January 1981 (age 45)
- Place of birth: Rome, Italy
- Height: 1.81 m (5 ft 11 1/2 in)
- Position: Winger

Youth career
- –2000: Roma

Senior career*
Years	Team	Apps	(Gls)
2000–2004	Virtus Lanciano	33	(1)
2004–2005	Ostiamare	33	(7)
2005–2007	Padova	46	(4)
2008	Pescara	8	(2)
2008–2016	Virtus Lanciano	184	(22)
- * Club domestic league appearances and goals as of 1 September 2015

Manuel Turchi (born 27 January 1981 in Rome) is a retired Italian professional football playing most of his career at Virtus Lanciano 1924

== Career ==
He played in Roma Primavera until 2000, before his transfer to Virtus Lanciano.

In July 2004 he moved to Ostiamare. In the following summer he was bought by Padova.

In January 2008 he went to Pescara, where he collected only 8 appearances.

In July 2008 he returns to Virtus Lanciano. In 2011–2012 season he conquered the promotion from Lega Pro Prima Divisione to Serie B.
