= Filippo Cristante =

Italian footballer and manager

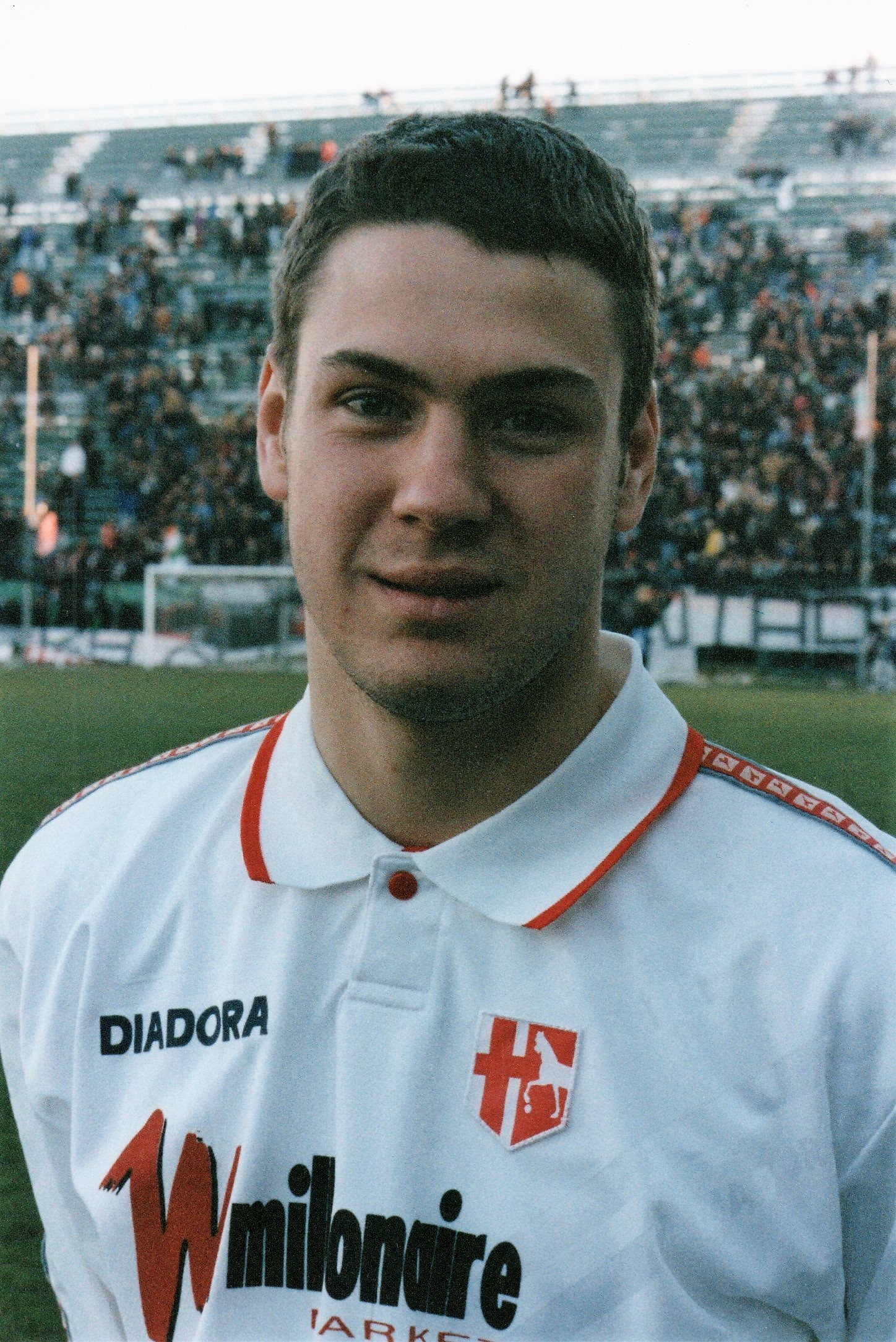
- Filippo cristante

Personal information
- Date of birth: 20 April 1977 (age 49)
- Place of birth: San Vito al Tagliamento, Italy
- Height: 1.86 m (6 ft 1 in)
- Position: Defender

Senior career*
| Years | Team | Apps | (Gls) |
| 1993–1994 | Sacilese | 0 | (0) |
| 1994–1996 | Cosenza | 24 | (1) |
| 1996–1998 | Padova | 47 | (0) |
| 1998–2001 | Ravenna | 91 | (5) |
| 2001–2005 | Piacenza | 101 | (0) |
| 2005–2006 | Messina | 35 | (1) |
| 2006–2009 | Mantova | 78 | (0) |
| 2009–2010 | Ancona | 35 | (1) |
| 2010–2012 | Portogruaro | 48 | (2) |
- * Club domestic league appearances and goals

Filippo Cristante (born 20 April 1977 in San Vito al Tagliamento) is an Italian football manager and former player, who last played as a defender for Italian club Portogruaro in Lega Pro.

== Career ==
Cristante started his career in the amateur divisions, with Sacilese, where he already demonstrated his talent, before moving to Serie B side Cosenza. Experiences with Padova and Ravenna in Serie B soon followed. In 2001, he moved to Piacenza, which he made his debut in the top division, starting in the Serie A match Lazio–Piacenza, on August 26, 2001, which ended in a 1–1 away draw. He remained with Piacenza (playing in two in first division league championships and two in Serie B) until January 2005, when he was hired by Messina in Serie A. With the team, he scored his first and so far only goal in the top division, under Peloritana. Since 2006, he has played for Mantova in the second division of Italian Football.

In July 2009, he signed a two-year contract with Ancona.

== Style of play ==
Equipped with a powerful physique, Cristante was a hard-working, tenacious and hard-tackling footballer who specialised in defensive roles; a versatile player, he was capable of playing anywhere along the back-line, and throughout his career he was used as a left or right-back, and as a central defender. Originally he played as an attacker, but was soon deployed in defence.

== Match-fixing scandal ==
Cristante was involved in the 2011–12 Italian football match-fixing scandal and was banned from any soccer-related activities for three years.
