= Gabriele Puccio =

Italian footballer

Personal information
- Date of birth: 3 August 1989 (age 37)
- Place of birth: Milan, Italy
- Height: 1.88 m (6 ft 2 in)
- Positions: Defender; defensive midfielder

Team information
- Current team: Caronnese

Youth career
- Internazionale

Senior career*
Years	Team	Apps	(Gls)
2007–2009	Internazionale	0	(0)
2008–2009	→ Verona (loan)	5	(0)
2009–2011	Portogruaro	26	(0)
2011–2012	Pavia	11	(0)
2012	→ Savona (loan)	0	(0)
2012–2013	Monza	20	(2)
2013–2015	Parma	0	(0)
2013–2014	→ Savona (loan)	9	(0)
2014	→ Pergolettese (loan)	9	(1)
2014–2015	→ Lamezia (loan)	29	(1)
2015–2016	Mantova	5	(0)
2016	Rimini	10	(0)
2016–2017	Caratese	17	(1)
2017–	Caronnese	7	(1)
- * Club domestic league appearances and goals as of 19 October 2017

Gabriele Puccio (born 3 August 1989) is an Italian footballer who plays as a defender or midfielder for S.C. Caronnese A.S.D.

== Career ==
=== FC Internazionale ===
Puccio worked his way up from Inter's Pulcini A (Under-11) team and has since worked his way up. Gabriele plays as a central defender or defensive midfielder for the Primavera team.

He made his debut in the 2007–08 UEFA Champions League against PSV Eindhoven on 12 December 2007. He also played the first leg of Coppa Italia against Reggina.

=== Lega Pro Prima Divisione ===
He spent the 2008–09 season on loan to Lega Pro Prima Divisione's Verona.

In summer 2009 he left for Portogruaro in co-ownership deal, for €5,000.

In 2011, he was signed by Pavia for €500. In January 2012 Puccio left for Savanoa of the fourth division but an injury made his vacation came early. In June 2012 Inter gave up the remain 50% registration rights. On 31 August 2012 he was signed by another fourth division side Monza. While former Inter teammate Maximiliano Uggè moved from Monza to Pavia.

On 27 July 2013 he was signed by Serie A club Parma as a free agent on a 2-year contract; on the same day he was farmed to the third division club Savona along with Alberto Galuppo and Alberto Giuliatto. on 31 January 2014 he was signed by Pergolettese.

On 8 July 2014 he was signed by Vigor Lamezia in a temporary deal.
