= Simon Barjie =

Association football player (born 1978)

Personal information
- Date of birth: 6 September 1978 (age 48)
- Place of birth: Milan, Italy
- Height: 1.75 m (5 ft 9 in)
- Position: Defender

Team information
- Current team: Monza (athletic trainer)

Senior career*
Years	Team	Apps	(Gls)
1996–1997	Solbiatese Arno	16	(0)
1997–1999	Como	2	(0)
1999–2004	Pro Sesto	126	(0)
2004–2008	Monza	110	(3)
2008–2009	Pro Patria	31	(0)
2009–2011	Monza	46	(0)
Total		331	(3)

International career
2003–2007	Gambia	4	(0)

Managerial career
- 2012–2013: Sampdoria (youth; trainer)
- 2013–2017: Como (trainer)
- 2017–: Monza (trainer)
- * Club domestic league appearances and goals

Simon Barjie (born 6 September 1978) is a former professional footballer who is the athletic trainer of Serie A club Monza. Born in Italy, he played for the Gambia national team.

== Club career ==
Born in Milan, Lombardy, Barjie started his career at the Serie C2 club Solbiatese Arno, 40 km away from Milan. In 1997, he was signed by Serie C1 club Como and played twice for the first team in 1997–98 Serie C1 season. In 1999, he left for Serie C2 club Pro Sesto along with Gabriele Donghi, in temporary deal (Barjie) and co-ownership deal (for 1 million lire, a peppercorn fee) respectively. Como paid Pro Sesto 30 million lire as an incentive for the loan. The deal later converted to co-ownership deal. In 2003, Como was relegated from Serie A and tried to buy back Barjie and Donghi but were out-bid by Pro Sesto, who bought Barjie and Donghi by submitted a closed tender to Lega Nazionale Professionisti.

=== Monza ===
In 2004, he left Pro Sesto for fellow Serie C2 team Monza; the team was promoted to Serie C1 in 2005. In 2008, he left for Pro Patria on a reported free transfer. But 1 season later he returned to Monza until his retire.

== International career ==
Barjie capped at least three times for Gambia. He played a friendly match against Luxembourg in 2007 and a 2006 FIFA World Cup qualifier in 2003.

== Personal life ==
He graduated as a Doctor in sports science in 2010 from Università Cattolica del Sacro Cuore. Barjie has a Gambian father and Italian mother. He visited Gambia for the first time in more than 10 years in 2003 and saw his father again. At that time he had an international duty for Gambia and the match was scheduled at Bakau, suburb of Banjul, the capital city.
