= Tommaso Colombaretti =

Italian football defender

Personal information
- Date of birth: 26 June 1980 (age 46)
- Place of birth: Fano, Italy
- Height: 1.85 m (6 ft 1 in)
- Positions: Defender; midfielder

Senior career*
Years	Team	Apps	(Gls)
1998–2000	Urbania	62	(6)
2000–2005	Fano	138	(12)
2005–2006	Martina	33	(4)
2006–2009	Foggia	83	(6)
2009–2011	Lanciano	43	(0)
2011–2013	Fano	66	(7)
2013–2014	Foggia	18	(3)
2015–2016	Manfredonia	40	(2)
2016–2017	Fabriano Cerreto		
2017–2019	Anconitana		
2019–2020	Moie Vallesina		
- * Club domestic league appearances and goals

Tommaso Colombaretti (born 26 June 1980) is an Italian former football defender.

In 2009, he was signed by Lanciano.
