= Luigi Rana =

Italian footballer (born 1986)

Personal information
- Date of birth: 6 November 1986 (age 39)
- Place of birth: Bari, Italy
- Height: 1.80 m (5 ft 11 in)
- Position: Forward

Team information
- Current team: Martina

Youth career
- Bari

Senior career*
Years	Team	Apps	(Gls)
2005–2013	Bari	5	(0)
2005–2006	→ Melfi (loan)	23	(4)
2006–2007	→ Gallipoli (loan)	4	(0)
2007	→ Valenzana (loan)	3	(2)
2007–2008	→ Manfredonia (loan)	13	(2)
2008–2009	→ Noicattaro (loan)	25	(4)
2009–2010	→ Paganese (loan)	8	(0)
2010	→ Nocerina (loan)	14	(2)
2011	→ Barletta (loan)	9	(1)
2012–2013	→ Vigor Lamezia (loan)	13	(1)
2013–	Martina		
- * Club domestic league appearances and goals as of 1 January 2013

Luigi Rana (born 6 November 1986) is an Italian footballer who plays for Martina.

== Biography ==
Rana was a youth product of A.S. Bari. He attended some pre-season training and received no.30 shirt in summer 2010 and no.97 in 2011 Rana received shirt number as he once treated as a member of the first team, until left on loan in January 2011. However, in 2011–12 season, only those excluded from the coach plan were received 90s number, which Rana only played twice. In July 2012 he left for Vigor Lamezia in temporary deal. In January 2013 Rana joined Martina outright along with Nicola Petrilli.
