= Francesco Stanco =

Italian footballer

Personal information
- Date of birth: 26 February 1987 (age 39)
- Place of birth: Pavullo nel Frignano, Italy
- Height: 1.91 m (6 ft 3 in)
- Position: Forward

Team information
- Current team: Carpi
- Number: 18

Youth career
- –2006: Modena

Senior career*
Years	Team	Apps	(Gls)
2006–2016	Modena	162	(21)
2006	→ Grosseto (loan)	8	(0)
2007	→ Boca San Lazzaro (loan)	8	(0)
2008	→ Valenzana Mado (loan)	14	(3)
2009–2010	→ Valenzana Mado (loan)	26	(4)
2014–2015	→ Pisa (loan)	14	(0)
2015	→ Cittadella (loan)	20	(6)
2016–2018	Cremonese	35	(6)
2018–2019	Sambenedettese	48	(15)
2019–2020	Feralpisalò	15	(0)
2020	Cittadella	16	(2)
2020–2022	Imolese	13	(1)
2021	→ Alessandria (loan)	14	(0)
2022–	Carpi	4	(0)

International career
2004	Italy U-18	2	(0)
- * Club domestic league appearances and goals as of 21 September 2022

Francesco Stanco (born 26 February 1987) is an Italian footballer who plays as a forward for Serie C Group A club Carpi.

== Club career ==
He made his Serie B debut for Modena in the 2005–06 season.

On 5 August 2019, he joined Serie C club Feralpisalò.

On 15 January 2020, he returned to Cittadella in Serie B.

On 1 October 2020, he signed a two-year contract with Imolese. On 5 January 2021, he joined Alessandria on loan until the end of the season.

On 12 July 2022, Stanco moved to Carpi in Serie D.

== International career ==
Stanco was a youth international for Italy U-18.
