= Alessandro Turchetta =

Italian footballer (born 1982)

Personal information
- Date of birth: March 26, 1982 (age 44)
- Place of birth: Velletri, Italy
- Height: 5 ft 11 in (1.80 m)
- Position: Striker

Team information
- Current team: Rondinelle LT Aprilia
- Number: 20

Youth career
- S.S. Lazio

Senior career*
| Years | Team | Apps | (Gls) |
| 2002–2003 | Florentia Viola | 13 | (1) |
| 2003 | Carrarese | 10 | (0) |
| 2003–2004 | A.S. Gubbio | 31 | (5) |
| 2004–2005 | Frosinone | 3 | (0) |
| 2005 | Grosseto | 8 | (0) |
| 2005–2006 | Fiorentina | 0 | (0) |
| 2006–2007 | Vicenza | 4 | (0) |
| 2007–2009 | San Marino Calcio | 45 | (3) |
| 2009– | Rondinelle LT Aprilia | 0 | (0) |
- * Club domestic league appearances and goals as of 19:37, 23 April 2010 (UTC)

Alessandro Turchetta (born 26 March 1982) is an Italian football striker. Currently playing for F.C. Rondinelle Latina S.S.D.
