= Alessandro Sandreani =

Italian footballer and manager (born 1979)

Personal information
- Date of birth: 20 October 1979 (age 47)
- Place of birth: Cagli, Italy
- Height: 1.77 m (5 ft 10 in)
- Position: Midfielder

Senior career*
Years	Team	Apps	(Gls)
1997–1998	Cantianese	27	(5)
1998–1999	Cagliese	27	(1)
1999–2000	Cantianese	25	(5)
2000–2002	Cagliese	57	(5)
2002–2013	Gubbio	292	(13)

Managerial career
- 2015–2018: Gubbio U-19
- 2018: Gubbio
- * Club domestic league appearances and goals

Alessandro Sandreani (born 20 October 1979) is an Italian professional football manager and a former player who played as a midfielder.

He is the son of former player and coach Mauro Sandreani.

== Playing career ==
Sandreani began his career with amateur side Cantianese in 1997. After playing well for Cagliese, in 2002 he marked his arrival in professional football by wearing the shirt of Gubbio in Serie C2. On 30 August 2011, he made his debut in Serie B, in a 3–2 loss against Ascoli.

== Coaching career ==
On 22 March 2018, he was hired as manager of the Serie C club Gubbio, the same club he spent most of his playing career. On 1 June 2018, Sandreani signed a one-year extension to his current contract keeping him at the club until the end of the 2018–19 season. On 26 November 2018, he was fired by Gubbio, with the team in 15th place in the table.
