= Fabio Meduri =

Italian footballer

Personal information
- Date of birth: 19 August 1991 (age 35)
- Place of birth: Melito di Porto Salvo, Italy
- Height: 1.78 m (5 ft 10 in)
- Position: Midfielder

Team information
- Current team: AC Calvina Sport

Youth career
- –2010: Atalanta

Senior career*
Years	Team	Apps	(Gls)
2010–2012	Monza	13	(0)
2011	→ Rodengo	13	(1)
2011–2012	→ Foggia (loan)	27	(1)
2012–2013	Barletta	17	(1)
2013–2014	Cosenza	18	(0)
2014	Savoia	0	(0)
2014–2015	Lumezzane	21	(1)
2015–2016	Ischia	15	(0)
2016	Monopoli	8	(0)
2016	Campobasso	11	(0)
2017–2018	Triestina	36	(1)
2018	Como	2	(0)
2018–2019	Pontisola	19	(0)
2019–	AC Calvina Sport	0	(0)
- * Club domestic league appearances and goals as of 22:56, 31 July 2019 (UTC)

Fabio Meduri (born 19 August 1991) is an Italian footballer who plays for A.C. Calvina Sport 1946 as a midfielder.

== Club career ==
Medduri was transferred to Monza on 13 June.

He made his debut for the club on 18 August, in the Coppa Italia defeat against Sassuolo.

His debut in the Prima Divisione was on 5 September, in the big defeat against Hellas Verona.

Meduri was loaned to Foggia Calcio until the end of 2011-12 season. He then resumed his career in the lower leagues, representing Barletta, Cosenza and Savoia.

On 31 August 2015 he joined Ischia Isolaverde on a free transfer.

Meduri signed for Como 1907 on 4 October 2018.

Ahead of the 2019/20 season, Meduri joined A.C. Calvina Sport 1946.
