= Dario Bergamelli =

Italian footballer (born 1987)

Personal information
- Date of birth: 26 April 1987 (age 39)
- Place of birth: Alzano Lombardo, Italy
- Height: 1.85 m (6 ft 1 in)
- Position: Defender

Senior career*
Years	Team	Apps	(Gls)
2005–2009	Atalanta	0	(0)
2006–2007	→ Salernitana (loan)	2	(0)
2007	→ Monza (loan)	1	(0)
2007–2008	→ Manfredonia (loan)	31	(0)
2008–2009	→ Verona (loan)	18	(0)
2009–2014	AlbinoLeffe	81	(3)
2012–2013	→ Reggina (loan)	19	(0)
2013–2014	→ Cremonese (loan)	23	(0)
2014–2015	Novara	19	(1)
2015–2017	Catania	56	(1)
2017–2018	Pro Vercelli	32	(1)
2018–2021	Ternana	49	(0)
2021–2022	Novara	27	(0)
- * Club domestic league appearances and goals as of 15 May 2022

Dario Bergamelli (born 26 April 1987) is an Italian footballer who plays as a defender.

== Biography ==
Bergamelli started his career at Atalanta B.C. He was farmed to Serie C1 and Serie C2 clubs such as Manfredonia

=== Albinoleffe ===
In July 2009 Bergamelli along with Michael Cia were exchanged with Nicola Madonna, all in co-ownership deal. Cia was valued at €400,000; Bergamelli €150,000; Madonna €550,000. Bergamelli and Cia signed a 5-year contract. In 2010–11 season, he gave up his no.19 shirt and took no.3 (which the original owner Davide Bombardini took no.10) and gave the no.19 shirt to new signing Andrea Cocco.

In June 2011 Atalanta acquired Madonna outright for €1,500 and sold Bergamelli, Cia and Karamoko Cissé for €500 each.

After AlbinoLeffe relegated in 2012, Bergamelli joined Serie B club Reggina Calcio, along with Mehmet Hetemaj. In June 2013 Reggina did not excised the option to sign them outright. In 2013 Bergamelli was signed by U.S. Cremonese in a temporary deal.

=== Novara ===
In July 2014, Bergamelli was signed by Novara Calcio in a 2-year contract.

=== Catania ===
On 16 September 2015, Bergamelli and Garufo were sold to Catania.

=== Ternana ===
On 31 August 2021, his contract with Ternana was terminated by mutual consent.
