= Marco Cunico =

Italian footballer

Personal information
- Date of birth: 5 March 1978 (age 48)
- Place of birth: Thiene, Italy
- Height: 1.77 m (5 ft 10 in)
- Position: Attacking midfielder

Team information
- Current team: AC Lumezzane (Technical director)

Youth career
- Vicenza

Senior career*
Years	Team	Apps	(Gls)
1997–1998	Sandonà	20	(2)
1998–1999	Novara	23	(1)
1999–2000	Carpi	28	(3)
2000–2001	Pordenone	24	(3)
2001–2004	Portogruaro	90	(30)
2004–2005	SPAL	23	(3)
2005–2013	Portogruaro	245	(58)
2013–2014	Marano	21	(5)
2014–2016	Padova	49	(13)
Total		523	(118)
- * Club domestic league appearances and goals

Marco Cunico (born 5 March 1978) is an Italian former footballer who played as an attacking midfielder.

== After retirement ==
After Cunico retired in the summer 2016, he became a part of the staff in Padova. He left this role on 19 January 2017, to join AC Lumezzane as a technical director.

== Honours ==
Portogruaro

- 2009–10 Lega Pro Prima Divisione: Champions

Padova

- 2014–15 Serie D: Champions
