= Michael Cia =

Italian footballer

Personal information
- Date of birth: 3 August 1988 (age 38)
- Place of birth: Bolzano, Italy
- Height: 1.75 m (5 ft 9 in)
- Position: Midfielder

Youth career
- Südtirol

Senior career*
Years	Team	Apps	(Gls)
2004–2007	Südtirol	49	(5)
2007–2009	Atalanta	0	(0)
2007–2008	→ Sambenedettese (loan)	20	(5)
2008–2009	→ Triestina (loan)	24	(2)
2009–2014	AlbinoLeffe	25	(0)
2011–2012	→ Benevento (loan)	32	(11)
2012–2013	→ Como (loan)	23	(4)
2013–2014	→ Pisa (loan)	20	(1)
2014–2018	Südtirol	105	(7)
2018	Delta Rovigo	4	(0)
2018–2020	St. Georgen	20	(3)
2020–2021	Virtus Bolzano	24	(0)
2021–2023	SSV Naturns		
2023–2026	SSV Brixen		

International career
2003	Italy U15	4	(0)
2003–2004	Italy U16	10	(2)
2005	Italy U17	5	(0)
2006–2007	Italy U19	9	(2)
2007–2008	Italy U20	3	(0)
2009	Italy U21	1	(0)
- * Club domestic league appearances and goals as of 14 October 2026

Michael Cia (born 3 August 1988) is an Italian footballer who plays as a midfielder.

== Club career ==
A native of South Tyrol, Cia joined Atalanta in joint-ownership bid on 30 January 2007, he then loaned to Sambenedettese and Triestina.

Atalanta bought the player outright in June 2009. In July 2009, he was sold to city "rival" (in fact the club had many player transfer) AlbinoLeffe of Serie B along with Dario Bergamelli in another co-ownership deal in 5-year contract, as part of the deal that Nicola Madonna was re-signed by Atalanta in co-ownership deal for €550,000. Half of Cia was tagged for €400,000, while Bergamelli was for €150,000.

In June 2011 AlbinoLeffe bought Bergamelli, Cia and Karamoko Cissé outright from promoted Atalanta.

On 31 August 2011 Cia left for Benevento and Domenico Germinale moved to AlbinoLeffe also in temporary deal.

On 31 August 2012 he left for club again to Calcio Como along with Francesco Luoni. Circa 2012 Cia's contract was also extended. In June 2013 Como did not excise the option to sign Cia outright.

In 2013 Cia was signed by Pisa in temporary deal, with option to sign him in co-ownership.

== International career ==
Cia has represented Italy at every youth level from Under-15 to Under-20. He played 3 times (one in third place match) in 2005 UEFA European Under-17 Championship and twice in 2005 FIFA U-17 World Championship.

On 25 March 2009 he made his debut with the Italy U-21 squad in a friendly match against Austria. That match was the fourth round of 2009–10 Four Nations Tournament. The tournament usually played by U-20 but Pierluigi Casiraghi used the match to prepare for the final round of 2009 U-21 Euro, selecting junior players (player born in 1988 or after) for that round (players born in 1986 or after were eligible).
