= Christian Altinier =

Italian football attacker (born 1983)

Cristian Altinier
Personal information
- Date of birth: February 15, 1983 (age 43)
- Place of birth: Mantua, Italy
- Height: 1.76 m (5 ft 9 in)
- Position: Forward

Team information
- Current team: Mantova
- Number: 11

Senior career*
| Years | Team | Apps | (Gls) |
| 2000–2004 | Mantova | 40 | (5) |
| 2004–2005 | → Biellese | 27 | (13) |
| 2005–2006 | Mantova | 4 | (0) |
| 2006 | → Cittadella (loan) | 11 | (4) |
| 2006–2008 | Mantova | 11 | (2) |
| 2008 | → Verona (loan) | 10 | (0) |
| 2008–2009 | → Sambonifacese (loan) | 31 | (18) |
| 2009–2011 | Portogruaro | 66 | (27) |
| 2011–2013 | Benevento | 36 | (14) |
| 2013 | → Portogruaro (loan) | 12 | (4) |
| 2013–2014 | Benevento | 10 | (4) |
| 2014 | Como | 10 | (3) |
| 2014–2015 | Ascoli | 32 | (17) |
| 2015–2017 | Padova | 70 | (30) |
| 2017–2018 | Reggiana | 38 | (13) |
| 2018– | Mantova | 9 | (5) |
- * Club domestic league appearances and goals as of 3 November 2017

Cristian Altinier (born 15 February 1983) is an Italian football attacker who currently plays for Mantova.

== Club career ==
In January 2013, he was loaned to Portogruaro.
