= Karamoko Cissé =

Guinean footballer (born 1988)

Personal information
- Date of birth: 14 November 1988 (age 37)
- Place of birth: Koubia, Guinea
- Height: 1.85 m (6 ft 1 in)
- Position: Forward

Youth career
- Virtus Petosino
- 2004–2006: Atalanta

Senior career*
Years	Team	Apps	(Gls)
2006–2009	Atalanta	3	(0)
2007–2008	→ Verona (loan)	23	(1)
2009–2014	AlbinoLeffe	97	(15)
2014–2015	Casertana	25	(12)
2015–2017	Benevento	57	(12)
2017–2018	Bari	32	(4)
2018–2020	Verona	6	(0)
2019	→ Carpi (loan)	9	(3)
2019–2020	→ Juve Stabia (loan)	18	(4)
2020–2021	Cittadella	10	(1)
2021–2022	Padova	20	(2)
Total		300	(54)

International career
2008–2011	Guinea	19	(3)
- * Club domestic league appearances and goals

Karamoko Cissé (born 14 November 1988) is a Guinean former footballer who plays as a forward. Cissé also holds Italian nationality.

== Biography ==
Born in Guinea in 1988, Cissé moved with his family to Sorisole, Italy in 2000.

== Club career ==
After spending season 2007–08 on loan at Hellas Verona, Cissé returned to Atalanta but did not make an appearance.

=== AlbinoLeffe ===
He joined AlbinoLeffe in a co-ownership deal in January 2009, for €700,000. On the same day Federico Peluso moved to Atalanta.

In 2010–11 season, he changed the shirt number from number 8 to number.17, the traditional bad luck number in Italy.

In June 2011 AlbinoLeffe bought Cissé, Michael Cia and Dario Bergamelli outright, co-currently sold Nicola Madonna outright. In 2011–12 season he took the number 10 shirt from retired Davide Bombardini.

On 21 March 2013 Cissé signed a new one-year contract with AlbinoLeffe.

=== Casertana ===
Cissé was signed by Casertana on 5 June 2014.

=== Benevento ===
On 13 July 2015 he signed for Benevento on a two-year contract.

=== Verona ===
==== Loan to Carpi ====
On 31 January 2019, he joined Carpi on loan until the end of the 2018–19 season.

==== Loan to Juve Stabia ====
On 20 August 2019, he joined Juve Stabia on loan with an obligation to buy.

=== Cittadella ===
On 2 October 2020, Cissé signed a contract with Cittadella.

=== Padova ===
On 1 February 2021, he moved to Serie C club Padova on a 1.5-year contract.

== International career ==
Cissé who was in the final squad and played in the qualifiers for Guinea in the Ghana 2008 African Cup of Nations. He has also been picked in the squad for the South Africa 2010 World Cup qualifiers.

== Career statistics ==
=== International ===
As of match played 15 November 2011

Appearances and goals by national team and year
National team	Year	Apps	Goals
Guinea	2007	1 (Note: A non FIFA match against Angola on 20 November 2020.)	1
Guinea	2008	6	0
Guinea	2009	5	0
Guinea	2010	3	2
Guinea	2011	4	0
Total		19	3

=== International goals ===
#	Date	Venue	Opponent	Score	Result	Competition
1.	20 November 2007	Stade Paul Fischer, Melun, France	Angola	0–3	Win	Friendly
2.	5 September 2010	Addis Ababa Stadium, Addis Ababa, Ethiopia	Ethiopia	1–4	Win	2012 ANC qualification
3.	17 November 2010	Stade Aimé Bergeal, Mantes-la-Ville, France	Burkina Faso	2–1	Lost	Friendly
Correct as of 19 November 2010
