= Portogruaro Calcio ASD =

Italian football club

Portogruaro
- Full name: Portogruaro Calcio; Associazione Sportiva Dilettantistica
- Nicknames: Granata; Porto
- Founded: 1919; 107 years ago as, Unione Sportiva Portogruarese; 1922; 104 years ago as, Associazione Sportiva La Romatina; 1990; 36 years ago as, Calcio Portogruaro-Summaga; 2013; 13 years ago as, Portogruaro Calcio Associazione Sportiva Dilettantistica (refounded)
- Ground: Stadio Pier Giovanni Mecchia, Portogruaro, Italy
- Capacity: 4,021
- Chairman: Roberto Calligaris
- Manager: Luca Lugnan
- League: Eccellenza Veneto
- 2025–26: Serie D/C, 18th (relegated)
Home colours	Away colours	Third colours

Associazione Sportiva Dilettantistica Portogruaro Calcio (usually referred to as Portogruaro) is an Italian association football club, based in Portogruaro, Veneto. Currently, it plays in Eccellenza Veneto.

== History ==
=== Calcio Portogruaro-Summaga ===

==== Foundation ====
The club was founded in 1990 as Calcio Portogruaro-Summaga and also known as Portosummaga after the merger of then-Promozione clubs Associazione Calcio Portogruaro (founded in 1919 in the city of Portogruaro) and Associazione Calcio Summaga (from Summaga, a frazione of Portogruaro itself).

==== From 2007 to 2013 ====
In the Serie C2 2007-08 regular season, Portosummaga finished third in Girone B and qualified for the promotional playoffs. The team defeated fourth-placed SPAL in the semi-finals because it was the higher-classified team after the pair ended in a 4–4 aggregate tie. In the finals, it defeated second-placed Bassano Virtus 5–3 on aggregate to win promotion to the then-called Lega Pro Prima Divisione for the 2008–09 season.

On 9 May 2010, under the tenure of former Serie A defender Alessandro Calori, the club defeated Verona on the final matchday to gain promotion to Serie B. They therefore marked their first appearance in the Italian second tier in the 2010–11 season. However, the club was relegated to Lega Pro Prima Divisione after only a single season in Serie B, finishing 21st. In the 2012–13 season, the club was relegated to Lega Pro Seconda Divisione.

=== 2013 refoundation ===
The club was refounded with the current name in the summer of 2013 restarting from Promozione. In 2019, the local entrepreneur Andrea Bertolini bought the club. At the end of the season, the team obtained the promotion to Eccellenza Veneto without ever losing a game.

== Colours and badge ==
The team's colours are dark red and black.

== Honours ==
- 2 Campionati di Promozione 1992–93, 2018–19
- 2 Campionati di Eccellenza 1995–96, 1997–98
- 1 Campionato di Serie D 2003–04
- 1 Campionato di Prima Divisione 2009–10
- 1 Coppa Disciplina 2009–10
