= 2016−17 Coppa Italia Lega Pro =

Tournament details
- Country: Italy
- Dates: 7 August 2016 – 26 April 2017
- Teams: 60

Final positions
- Champions: Venezia
- Runners-up: Matera

Tournament statistics
- Top goal scorer: Nicola Ferrari (6 goals)

The 2016–17 Coppa Italia Lega Pro was the 45th edition of the Coppa Italia Lega Pro, the cup competition for Lega Pro clubs.

Foggia were the defending champions having won their first title on 14 April 2016 against Cittadella, but were eliminated by Matera in the round of 16.

Venezia won the competition by defeating Matera 3–2 on aggregate in the final, winning their first title.

== Group stage ==
=== Group A ===
7 August 2016	Giana Erminio	3–0	Renate	Gorgonzola
17:30 CEST	Bruno 43' (pen.); Okyere 60'; Greslin 89'			Stadium: Stadio Città di Gorgonzola

13 August 2016	Renate	0–2	Lumezzane	Meda
18:00 CEST			Marcilio 56'; Leonetti 60'	Stadium: Stadio Città di Meda

21 August 2016	Lumezzane	0–2	Giana Erminio	Lumezzane
18:00 CEST			Marotta 25'; Chiarello 52'	Stadium: Stadio Tullio Saleri

=== Group B ===
7 August 2016	Parma	2–1	Piacenza	Parma
18:00 CEST	Evacuo 70'; Guazzo 88'		Razziti 64'	Stadium: Stadio Ennio Tardini

13 August 2016	Piacenza	0–0	Pro Piacenza	Piacenza
18:00 CEST				Stadium: Stadio Leonardo Garilli

21 August 2016	Piacenza	2–1	Parma	Piacenza
18:00 CEST	Pesenti 26'; Piana 90+2'		Calaiò 28' (pen.)	Stadium: Stadio Leonardo Garilli

=== Group C ===
7 August 2016	Mantova	0–0	Santarcangelo	Mantova
17:30 CEST				Stadium: Stadio Danilo Martelli

13 August 2016	Venezia	1–0	Mantova	Venice
18:00 CEST	Pederzoli 54'			Stadium: Stadio Pier Luigi Penzo

21 August 2016	Santarcangelo	2–2	Venezia	Santarcangelo di Romagna
17:30 CEST	Valentini 51'; Cesaretti 63'		Ferrari 1'; Pederzoli 68'	Stadium: Stadio Valentino Mazzola

=== Group D ===
7 August 2016	Lucchese	1–2	Pistoiese	Lucca
20:45 CEST	Forte 90' (pen.)		Rovini 24'; Varano 42'	Stadium: Stadio Porta Elisa

13 August 2016	Prato	0–1	Lucchese	Prato
20:45 CEST			Terrani 90+4'	Stadium: Stadio Lungobisenzio

21 August 2016	Pistoiese	1–4	Prato	Pistoia
20:45 CEST	Rovini 54'		Antonini 9'; Romano 26'; Tavano 28', 31'	Stadium: Stadio Marcelli Melani

=== Group E ===
7 August 2016	Gubbio	2–1	Sambenedettese	Gubbio
20:30 CEST	Giacomarro 50'; Marini 66'		Mancuso 90'	Stadium: Stadio Pietro Barbetti

13 August 2016	Sambenedettese	2–1	Viterbese	San Benedetto del Tronto
17:00 CEST	Di Filippo 82'; Pezzotti 88'		Varutti 66'	Stadium: Stadio Rivera delle Palme

21 August 2016	Viterbese	3–1	Gubbio	Viterbo
17:00 CEST	Cuffa 9'; Neglia 46'; Sforzini 77'		Lunetta 30'	Stadium: Stadio Enrico Rocchi

=== Group F ===
7 August 2016	Monopoli	2–0	Catanzaro	Monopoli
20:30 CEST	Balestrello 66'; Gatto 82'			Stadium: Stadio Vito Simone Veneziani

13 August 2016	Catanzaro	1–0	Francavilla	Catanzaro
17:30 CEST	Baccolo 10'			Stadium: Stadio Nicola Ceravolo

21 August 2016	Virtus Francavilla	5–1	Monopoli	Francavilla Fontana
17:00 CEST	De Angelis 29'; Gallù 32'; Nzola 55'; Prezioso 62'; Alessandro 70'		De Vito 7'	Stadium: Stadio Giovanni Paolo II

=== Group G ===
7 August 2016	Akragas	3–0	Siracusa	Agrigento
17:00 CEST	Longo 8', 45+1'; Zanini 84'			Stadium: Stadio Esseneto

13 August 2016	Siracusa	1–1	Catania	Siracusa
17:30 CEST	Catania 67' (pen.)		Paolucci 32'	Stadium: Stadio Nicola De Simone

21 August 2016	Catania	2–0	Akragas	Catania
20:30 CEST	Calil 53'; Paolucci 80' (pen.)			Stadium: Stadio Angelo Massimino

=== Group H ===
17 August 2016	Forlì	0–2	Fano	Forlì
18:00 CEST			Cocuzza 29'; Bellemi 30'	Stadium: Stadio Tullio Margagni

22 August 2016	AlbinoLeffe	1–0	Forlì	Bergamo
17:00 CEST	Loviso 90+2' (pen.)			Stadium: Stadio Atleti Azzurri d'Italia

24 August 2016	Fano	1–1	AlbinoLeffe	Fano
16:00 CEST	Lanini 44'		Ravasio 26'	Stadium: Stadio Raffaele Mancini

=== Group I ===
17 August 2016	Olbia	1–0	Racing Club Roma	Olbia
19:00 CEST	Geroni 64'			Stadium: Stadio Bruno Nespoli

31 August 2016	Racing Club Roma	1–2	Lupa Roma	Rome
17:30 CEST	Calabrese 46'		Mastropietro 21'; Iorio 77'	Stadium: Stadio Casal Del Marmo

24 August 2016	Lupa Roma	1–1	Olbia	Tivoli
17:00 CEST	Ventola 69'		Geroni 80'	Stadium: Stadio Olindo Galli

=== Group L ===
17 August 2016	Taranto	2–1	Melfi	Taranto
20:30 CEST	Managhi 76', 80'		De Vena 73'	Stadium: Stadio Ernesto Iacovone

21 August 2016	Melfi	2–1	Racing Fondi	Melfi
20:30 CEST	Foggia 68'; De Giosa 87'		Albadoro 73'	Stadium: Stadio Arturo Valerio

24 August 2016	Racing Fondi	2–1	Taranto	Fondi
16:30 CEST	De Agostino 33'; Tiscione 90+4'		Cardea 59'	Stadium: Stadio Domenico Purificato

=== Group M ===
17 August 2016	Paganese	0–2	Vibonese	Pagani
20:30 CEST			Saraniti 70' (pen.); Rossetti 78'	Stadium: Stadio Marcello Torre

21 August 2016	Reggina	0–1	Paganese	Pagani
16:30 CEST			Silvestri 7'	Stadium: Stadio Marcello Torre
Note: Tie reversed from the original draw.

24 August 2016	Vibonese	2–2	Reggina	Vibo Valentia
17:00 CEST	Chiavazzo 52'; Saraniti 63'		Bangu 39'; De Francesco 70' (pen.)	Stadium: Stadio Luigi Razza

== Knock-out stage ==
=== First round ===
18 October 2016	Pordenone	1–2 (a.e.t.)	Südtirol	Pordenone
17:30 CEST	Azzi 11'		Spagnoli 68'; Tulli 116'	Stadium: Stadio Ottavio Bottecchia

19 October 2016	Pro Piacenza	1–4	Giana Erminio	Piacenza
14:30 CEST	Bini 81'		Sosia 3'; Bruno 23', 63'; Ferrari 76' (pen.)	Stadium: Stadio Leonardo Garilli

19 October 2016	Prato	0–2	Arezzo	Prato
14:30 CEST			Bearzotti 37'; Grossi 79'	Stadium: Stadio Lungobisenzio

19 October 2016	Foggia	4–1	Juve Stabia	Foggia
14:30 CEST	Padovan 18', 76'; Chiricò 51', 88'		Lisi 55'	Stadium: Stadio Pino Zaccheria

19 October 2016	Virtus Francavilla	1–1 (a.e.t.) (4–5 p)	Lecce	Francavilla Fontana
14:30 CEST	Idda 90'		Vutov 18'	Stadium: Stadio Giovanni Paolo II
	Penalties
	De Angelis (penalty scored); Abruzzese (penalty scored); Nzola (penalty scored); Galedan (penalty scored); Abate (penalty missed); Gallù (penalty missed)		(penalty missed) Gomis; (penalty scored) Drudi; (penalty scored) Persano; (penalty scored) Conev; (penalty scored) Vutov; (penalty scored) Ciancio

19 October 2016	Messina	2–0	Vibonese	Messina
16:30 CEST	Ferri 50'; Madonia 74'			Stadium: Stadio San Filippo

=== Round of 32 ===
1 November 2016	Modena	0–3	Reggiana	Modena
14:30 CET			Otín 11'; Mogoș 19'; Falcone 60'	Stadium: Stadio Alberto Braglia

1 November 2016	Padova	2–1	Bassano Virtus	Padua
16:30 CET	Fantasci 12'; Cisco 18'		Bianchi 68'	Stadium: Stadio Euganeo

2 November 2016	Giana Erminio	3–1 (a.e.t.)	Alessandria	Gorgonzola
14:30 CET	Perna 84', 95'; Lella 100'		Marconi 34' (pen.)	Stadium: Stadio Città di Gorgonzola

2 November 2016	Livorno	0–0 (a.e.t.) (3–4 p)	Carrarese	Livorno
14:30 CET				Stadium: Stadio Armando Picchi
	Penalties
	Borghese (penalty scored); Cellini (penalty scored); Luci (penalty missed); Ferchichi (penalty missed); Murilo (penalty scored)		(penalty missed) Del Nero; (penalty scored) Miracoli; (penalty scored) Marabese; (penalty scored) Torelli; (penalty scored) Bastoni

2 November 2016	Messina	2–0	Catania	Messina
14:30 CET	Madonia 28', 79'			Stadium: Stadio San Filippo

2 November 2016	Taranto	1–1 (a.e.t.) (5–4 p)	Cosenza	Taranto
16:30 CET	Stendardo 76'		Stalletta 90+3'	Stadium: Stadio Erasmo Iacovone
	Penalties
	Cedric (penalty missed); Bobb (penalty scored); Boccadamo (penalty scored); Balzamo (penalty scored); Balistreri (penalty scored)		(penalty missed) Baclet; (penalty scored) Stanella; (penalty missed) Corsi; (penalty scored) Capece; (penalty missed) Cavallaro

2 November 2016	Siena	2–0	Viterbese	Siena
18:30 CET	Firenze 2'; Šarić 10'			Stadium: Stadio Artemio Franchi – Montepaschi Arena

2 November 2016	Como	1–0	Cremonese	Como
20:30 CET	Cortesi 90+1' (pen.)			Stadium: Stadio Giuseppe Sinigalia

2 November 2016	Teramo	4–3 (a.e.t.)	Lupa Roma	Teramo
20:30 CET	Petermann 41' (pen.); Croce 77', 116'; Manganelli 97'		Montesi 52'; Palomeque 83'; Ventola 100'	Stadium: Stadio Gaetano Bonolis

8 November 2016	Ancona	1–0	Fano	Ancona
14:30 CET	Malerba 35'			Stadium: Stadio Del Conero

8 November 2016	Südtirol	0–4	Venezia	Bolzano
14:30 CET			Malomo 9'; Brugger 25' (o.g.); Moreo 71'; Ferrari 85'	Stadium: Stadio Briuso

9 November 2016	Pontedera	3–1	Feralpisalò	Pontedera
14:30 CET	Della Latta 28'; Risalti 44'; Di Santo 71'		Davi 21'	Stadium: Stadio Ettore Mannucci

9 November 2016	Arezzo	1–1 (a.e.t.) (3–4 p)	Tuttocuoio	Arezzo
14:30 CET	Moscardelli 35'		Serinelli 71'	Stadium: Stadio Città di Arezzo
	Penalties
	Moscardelli (penalty scored); Erpen (penalty scored); Rossetti (penalty missed); Corradi (penalty missed); Polidori (penalty scored); Luciani (penalty missed); Milesi (penalty scored)		(penalty missed) Siani; (penalty scored) Gelli; (penalty missed) Cacciagli; (penalty scored) Masia; (penalty scored) Falivena; (penalty missed) Merkaj; (penalty scored) Lo Porto

9 November 2016	Fidelis Andria	1–1 (a.e.t.) (3–4 p)	Foggia	Andria
14:30 CET	Onescu 33'		Chiricò 72'	Stadium: Stadio Degli Ulivi
	Penalties
	Rada (penalty scored); Klaric (penalty missed); Curcio (penalty scored); Fall (penalty scored); Annoni (penalty missed)		(penalty scored) Ângelo; (penalty scored) Padovan; (penalty scored) Agazzi; (penalty missed) Rivelora; (penalty scored) Chiricò

9 November 2016	Maceratese	2–1	Casertana	Macerata
15:30 CET	Kamboura 6'; Allegretti 28'		De Filippo 52'	Stadium: Stadio Helvia Racina

9 November 2016	Matera	2–1	Lecce	Matera
20:30 CET	Iannini 23'; Strambelli 90+1' (pen.)		Persano 52'	Stadium: Stadio XXI Settembre-Franco Salerno

=== Round of 16 ===
16 November 2016	Como	1–0	Giana Erminio	Como
17:30 CET	Cortesi 37'			Stadium: Stadio Giuseppe Sinigalia

22 November 2016	Ancona	2–1	Maceratese	Ancona
14:30 CET	Gelonese 45', 76'		Gremizzi 72'	Stadium: Stadio Del Conero

22 November 2016	Venezia	1–1 (a.e.t.) (4–2 p)	Reggio Audace	Venice
16:30 CET	Štulac 101'		Maltese 115' (pen.)	Stadium: Stadio Pier Luigi Penzo
	Penalties
	Ferrari (penalty scored); Moreo (penalty scored); Marsura (penalty scored); Štulac (penalty scored)		(penalty scored) Otín; (penalty missed) Mecca; (penalty scored) Giron; (penalty missed) Maltese

23 November 2016	Carrarese	0–1	Padova	Carrara
14:30 CET			Gaiola 12'	Stadium: Stadio Dei Marmi

23 November 2016	Teramo	2–0	Siena	Teramo
14:30 CET	Croce 53' (pen.), 83'			Stadium: Stadio Gaetano Bonolis

23 November 2016	Foggia	0–1	Matera	Foggia
16:30 CET			Carretta 15'	Stadium: Stadio Pino Zaccheria

23 November 2016	Taranto	1–0	Messina F.C.	Taranto
16:30 CET	Lo Sicco 39'			Stadium: Stadio Erasmo Iacovone

23 November 2016	Pontedera	1–3	Tuttocuoio	Pontedera
18:30 CET	Risaliti 23'		Siani 28' (pen.), 60'; Merkaj 38'	Stadium: Stadio Ettore Mannucci

=== Quarter-finals ===
8 February 2017	Teramo	1–1 (a.e.t.) (2–4 p)	Ancona	Teramo
14:30 CET	Sansovini 50'		Frediani 28'	Stadium: Stadio Gaetano Bonolis
	Shootout
	Caidi (penalty scored); Dipaolantonio (penalty scored); Amadio (penalty missed); Ilari (penalty missed)		(penalty scored) Bariti; (penalty scored) Mancini; (penalty scored) Agyei; (penalty scored) Momentè

8 February 2017	Tuttocuoio	0–1	Padova	Pontedera
14:30 CET			De Cenco 10'	Stadium: Stadio Ettore Mannucci

8 February 2017	Como	1–2 (a.e.t.)	Venezia	Como
17:00 CET	Chinellato 84'		Ferrari 90', 112'	Stadium: Stadio Giuseppe Sinnaglia

21 February 2017	Taranto	0–1	Matera	Taranto
14:30 CET			Negro 15'	Stadium: Stadio Ernesto Iacovone

=== Semi-finals ===
==== First leg ====
22 February 2017	Padova	1–1	Venezia	Padua
20:30 CET	Mazzocco 36'		Ferrari 30'	Stadium: Stadio Euganeo

1 March 2017	Matera	1–0	Ancona	Matera
14:30 CET	Casoli 75'			Stadium: Stadio XXI Settembre-Franco Salerno

==== Second leg ====
8 March 2017	Anconitana	2–2 (2–3 agg.)	Matera	Ancona
14:30 CET	Ricci 11'; Zampa 27'		Gigli 53'; Negro 61'	Stadium: Stadio Del Conero

8 March 2017	Venezia	3–1 (4–2 agg.)	Padova	Venice
19:00 CET	Fabiano 2'; Štulac 10'; Malomo 69'		De Cenco 60'	Stadium: Stadio Pier Luigi Penzo

== Final ==
29 March 2017
20:30 CEST

Matera	1–0	Venezia
Negro 44'	Report

Stadio XXI Settembre-Franco Salerno, Matera
Attendance: 5,000
Referee: Pillimetri (Palermo)

26 April 2017
17:00 CEST

Venezia	3–1	Matera
Moreo 27'; Fabbiano 34'; Ferrari 60'	Report	Strambelli 58'

Stadio Pier Luigi Penzo, Venice
Attendance: 2,260
Referee: Fourneau (Rome)

Venezia won 3–2 on aggregate.
