= Okyere =

Okyere is a surname. Notable people with the surname include:

- Asante Gullit Okyere (born 1988), footballer
- Lawrence Adjei-Okyere (or Lawrence Adjei) (born 1979), footballer
- Edward Yaw Okyere Asafu-Adjaye (or Ed Asafu-Adjaye) (born 1988), footballer
- Nana Kwaku Okyere Duah known as Tic Tac (musician), hiplife musician
- Simon Okyere, Lawyer
- Emmanuel Kwadwo Okyere Darko, Top Security Agent
- Kofi Okyere Darko, Journalist
- Nana Yaw Okyere, Blogger
