= SSD Tivoli Calcio 1919 =

Italian football club

Tivoli
- Full name: Società Sportiva Dilettante; Tivoli Calcio 1919
- Nickname(s): –
- Founded: 1919
- Ground: Stadio Olindo Galli, Tivoli, Italy
- Capacity: 4,000
- Chairman: Patrizia Diodati
- League: Eccellenza
- 2023-24: Serie D
Home colours	Away colours

Società Sportiva Dilettante Tivoli Calcio 1919 is an Italian football club located in Tivoli, Lazio. It currently plays in Eccellenza. Its colors are blue and dark red.
