= Mattia Di Vincenzo =

Italian footballer

Personal information
- Date of birth: 10 June 1992 (age 34)
- Place of birth: Lanciano, Italy
- Position: Goalkeeper

Team information
- Current team: Maceratese

Youth career
- SPAL Lanciano
- 2007–2010: Siena

Senior career*
Years	Team	Apps	(Gls)
2010–2014	Siena	0	(0)
2010–2011	→ Santegidiese (loan)	33	(0)
2011–2012	→ Sambenedettese (loan)	31	(0)
2012–2013	→ Aprilia (loan)	34	(0)
2013–2014	→ Carrarese (loan)	3	(0)
2015–	Maceratese	0	(0)
- * Club domestic league appearances and goals as of 16 March 2014

Mattia Di Vincenzo (born 10 June 1992) is an Italian footballer who plays for Maceratese.

== Biography ==
=== Siena ===
Born in Lanciano, Abruzzo, Di Vincenzo started his career at San Pietro Apostolo Lanciano (SPAL Lanciano). In 2007, he was signed by Tuscan club Siena along with Nicolas Di Filippo. Di Vincenzo was a member of Siena "student" team (Italian: Allievi) in 2008–09 season. In 2009–10 season he was one of the keeper of the reserve (along with Richard Gabriel Marcone borrowed from "Allievi" team) However the true first choices were overage players Mihail Ivanov and Anssi Jaakkola. In 2010 Di Vincenzo left for amateur club Santegidiese, in Italian Serie D. Di Vincenzo remained in Serie D in 2011–12 season, for Sambenedettese.

In July 2012 Di Vincenzo received a call-up to Siena's pre-season camp as the third keeper. In the same transfer window he was farmed to Lega Pro Seconda Divisione club Aprilia. Siena gifted half of the registration rights of Di Vincenzo to Aprilia for €500. He also received call-up to Italy Lega Pro representative teams. He played the match against Russia in 2011–13 International Challenge Trophy as well as Croatia U20 in a U20 Regional Competition (ex- Mirop Cup).

On 21 June 2013 Di Vincenzo returned to Siena also for €500.

Di Vincenzo was the fourth keeper of Siena in 2013 pre-season. As the first choice, Gianluca Pegolo had transfer rumor since June 2013, which made Di Vincenzo de facto the third keeper. He wore no.22 shirt previously owned by Matteo Contini. On 21 August Di Vincenzo left for Lega Pro Prima Divisione club Carrarese in temporary deal with option to purchase, which Romanian Alin Bucuroiu became the new third keeper since 12 September as well as Pegolo left the club on 2 September. At Carrarese Di Vincenzo was an understudy of Matteo Nodari. Since January 2014 Di Vincenzo became the backup of Alex Calderoni.

=== Maceratese ===
On 19 February 2015 he was signed by Serie D club Maceratese. Di Vincenzo also on trial at the third division club Ascoli on 31 July 2014.
