= Jacopo Bacci =

Italian footballer (born 2005)

Personal information
- Date of birth: 19 June 2005 (age 21)
- Place of birth: Venice, Italy
- Height: 1.73 m (5 ft 8 in)
- Position: Midfielder

Team information
- Current team: Sorrento
- Number: 4

Youth career
- Padova
- 2023–2025: → Empoli U-19 (loan)

Senior career*
Years	Team	Apps	(Gls)
2021–2026	Padova	1	(0)
2024–2025	→ Empoli (loan)	3	(0)
2026–	Sorrento	0	(0)
- * Club domestic league appearances and goals as of 29 August 2026

Jacopo Bacci (born 19 June 2005) is an Italian professional footballer who plays as a midfielder for Serie C Group C club Sorrento.

== Club career ==
Having played the 2021–22 season in the Primavera squad, Jacopo Bacci made his professional debut for Calcio Padova on the 24 April 2022 along with his under-19 captain Jacopo Gasparini, replacing Ronaldo during a 2–1 home Serie C loss to Virtus Verona.

He subsequently became a stable member of the professional group, with whom he left for the subsequent training session in France, with RC Lens.

On 31 August 2023, Bacci moved to Empoli on a two-year loan, where he was initially assigned to their Under-19 squad.

Bacci made his Serie A debut for Empoli's senior squad on 2 February 2025 in a 1–4 loss to Juventus.
