= Coppa Italia Serie C =

- Organiser(s): Lega Pro
- Founded: 1972
- Region: Italy
- Teams: 60
- Qualifier for: Serie C promotion play-offs Coppa Italia
- Current champions: Potenza (1st title)
- Most championships: Monza (4 titles)
- Broadcaster: Eleven Sports
- Website: Official webpage
- 2025–26 Coppa Italia Serie C

Coppa Italia Serie C (Italian: Serie C Italian Cup), formerly named Coppa Italia Lega Pro, is a straight knock-out based competition involving teams from Serie C in Italian football first held in 1972.

== Format ==
There are a total of six rounds in the competition. It begins in August with the first set, which is contested by 56 out of 60 teams. The other four clubs, which also play in Coppa Italia, join in during the second set. Each game is played as a single leg, except for the semi-finals and the final. If teams are tied (after single leg or on aggregate, no away goal rule applies), the winner is decided by extra-time and a penalty shootout if required.

As well as being presented with the trophy, the winning team also qualifies for the following edition of Coppa Italia and for the third round of Serie C promotion play-offs. If the winners:

- are already promoted to Serie B via finishing in the top of the league;
- have already qualified for the third round or the quarterfinals via finishing in the 3rd or the 2nd position respectively;
- have qualified for the relegation play-outs;
- are relegated to Serie D;
- or just renounce;

their spot goes to the runners-up or, subordinately, to the 4th-placed team playing in the same group as the winners.

Phase	Round	Clubs remaining	Clubs involved	From previous round	Entries in this round	Teams entering at this round
First phase	First round	60	56	none	56	56 teams from Serie C
First phase	Second round	32	32	28	4	4 teams from Serie C which play in Coppa Italia
Second phase	Round of 16	16	16	16	none	
Second phase	Quarter-finals	8	8	8	none	
Second phase	Semi-finals	4	4	4	none	
Second phase	Final	2	2	2	none	

== Past winners ==
=== Coppa Italia Serie C ===
Year	Winner	Runner up
1972–73	Alessandria	Avellino
1973–74	Monza	Lecce
1974–75	Monza	Sorrento
1975–76	Lecce	Monza
1976–77	Lecco	Sangiovannese
1977–78	Udinese	Reggina
1978–79	Siracusa	Biellese
1979–80	Padova	Salernitana
1980–81	Arezzo	Ternana
1981–82	Vicenza	Campobasso
1982–83	Carrarese	Fano
1983–84	Fanfulla	Ancona
1984–85	Casarano	Carrarese
1985–86	Virescit Boccaleone	Jesi
1986–87	Livorno	Campania Puteolana
1987–88	Monza	Palermo
1988–89	Cagliari	Spal
1989–90	Lucchese	Palermo
1990–91	Monza	Palermo
1991–92	Sambenedettese	Siena
1992–93	Palermo	Como
1993–94	Triestina	Perugia
1994–95	Varese	Forlì
1995–96	Empoli	Monza
1996–97	Como	Nocerina
1997–98	Alzano Virescit	Cesena
1998–99	Spal	Gualdo
1999–2000	Pisa	Avellino
2000–01	Prato	Lumezzane
2001–02	AlbinoLeffe	Livorno
2002–03	Brindisi	Pro Patria
2003–04	Cesena	Pro Patria
2004–05	Spezia	Frosinone
2005–06	Gallipoli	Sanremese
2006–07	Foggia	Cuneo
2007–08	Bassano Virtus	Benevento

=== Coppa Italia Lega Pro ===
Year	Winner	Runner up
2008–09	Sorrento	Cremonese
2009–10	Lumezzane	Cosenza
2010–11	Juve Stabia	Carpi
2011–12	Spezia	Pisa
2012–13	Latina	Viareggio
2013–14	Salernitana	Monza
2014–15	Cosenza	Como
2015–16	Foggia	Cittadella
2016−17	Venezia	Matera

=== Coppa Italia Serie C ===
Year	Winner	Runner up
2017–18	Alessandria	Viterbese Castrense
2018–19	Viterbese Castrense	Monza
2019–20	Juventus U23	Ternana
2020–21	Cancelled	
2021–22	Padova	Südtirol
2022–23	Vicenza	Juventus Next Gen
2023–24	Catania	Padova
2024–25	Rimini	Giana Erminio
2025–26	Potenza	Latina

== See also ==
- Football in Italy
- Lega Pro
- Serie C
