= Daniele Solcia =

Italian footballer (born 2001)

Personal information
- Date of birth: 7 March 2001 (age 25)
- Place of birth: Treviglio, Italy
- Height: 1.86 m (6 ft 1 in)
- Position: Centre-back

Team information
- Current team: Sorrento
- Number: 15

Youth career
- Tritium
- –2019: Atalanta

Senior career*
Years	Team	Apps	(Gls)
2019–2025	Atalanta	0	(0)
2019–2020	→ Pontisola (loan)	25	(0)
2020–2021	→ Lucchese (loan)	22	(0)
2021–2022	→ Seregno (loan)	16	(1)
2022–2023	→ Virtus Francavilla (loan)	25	(2)
2023–2024	→ Atalanta U23 (res.)	21	(0)
2024–2025	→ Giugliano (loan)	32	(0)
2025–	Sorrento	36	(0)
- * Club domestic league appearances and goals as of 1 May 2026

Daniele Solcia (born 7 March 2001) is an Italian professional footballer who plays as a centre-back for Serie C Group C club Sorrento.

== Career ==
Solcia began his youth career aged five at Tritium, before moving to Atalanta's youth sector.

On 22 July 2019, Solcia was sent on loan to Serie D side Pontisola, where he played 25 league games. On 1 September 2020, Solcia joined Serie C club Lucchese on loan. He made his professional debut on 27 September 2020, in a 3–3 home draw to Pergolettese.

On 31 July 2021, Solcia moved to newly promoted Serie C side Seregno on a one-year loan. On 2 July 2022, Solcia was loaned to Virtus Francavilla. On 25 July 2024, Solcia joined Giugliano on loan.

On 1 August 2025, Solcia signed with Sorrento in Serie C on a permanent basis.

== Style of play ==
A versatile defender, Solcia mainly plays as a centre-back, both on the right and on the left, and can also be used as a full-back.
