= Alin Bucuroiu =

Romanian footballer (born 1991)

Personal information
- Full name: George Alin Bucuroiu
- Date of birth: 5 July 1991 (age 35)
- Place of birth: Râmnicu Vâlcea, Romania
- Height: 1.95 m (6 ft 5 in)
- Position: Goalkeeper

Youth career
- Hidroelectrica Râmnicu Vâlcea
- 2007–2011: Udinese

Senior career*
| Years | Team | Apps | (Gls) |
| 2011–2012 | Udinese | 0 | (0) |
| 2011–2012 | → Alessandria (loan) | 0 | (0) |
| 2012 | → Brăila (loan) | 14 | (0) |
| 2012–2014 | Siena | 0 | (0) |
| 2012–2013 | → Otopeni (loan) | 23 | (0) |

International career
| 2007–2008 | Romania U17 | 6 | (0) |
| 2010 | Romania U19 | 3 | (0) |
- * Club domestic league appearances and goals

George Alin Bucuroiu (born 5 July 1991) is a former Romanian footballer.

== Biography ==
Born in Râmnicu Vâlcea, Romania, Bucuroiu started his career at Hidroelectrica Râmnicu Vâlcea. On 31 August 2007, he was signed by Italian Serie A club Udinese in a temporary deal, just barely above the minimum age of international transfer within the European Union (age 16). In the next season, Udinese signed Bucuroiu outright. He spent a season with the "student" team of Udinese (Italian: Allievi) and 3 seasons with the reserve team "Primavera". On 31 August 2011, Bucuroiu was signed by Alessandria. However, after nil appearances in 2011–12 Lega Pro Seconda Divisione, Bucuroiu left for Romanian Liga II club Brăila. In summer 2012, Bucuroiu was signed by Serie A club Siena in co-ownership deal for €300,000. In summer 2012 Bucuroiu also left for Liga II club Otopeni for free. In June 2013 Siena acquired the full registration rights from Udinese for free (as the club did not gave a bid to Lega Serie A despite no agreement was made)

In summer 2013 Bucuroiu returned to Siena, now at Serie B; He took no.22 shirt from Mattia Di Vincenzo. The goalkeeper retired in November 2014, from active football at the age of 24.

=== International career ===
Bucuroiu made his competitive debut for Romania U17 team on 25 October 2007. He played all 3 games in the qualification as well as all 3 games in elite qualification. Bucuroiu played all 3 games in 2010 U19 elite qualification. Cristian Sava dropped the original starter Gabriel Abraham and used Bucuroiu instead. In the last game, Bucuroiu was substituted by George Vartopeanu.
