= Francesca Bodie =

American businesswoman (born 1985)

- Born: Francesca Leiweke; 1985 (age 40–41); Como, Italy
- Occupation: Football club president
- Organization: Venezia

Francesca Leiweke Bodie (born 1985) is an American businesswoman who is the president of Venezia.

== Career ==
Bodie worked as the chief operating officer of American venue management company Oak View Group. In 2026, she was appointed president of Italian side Venezia, becoming the fourth woman to be appointed president of a Serie A club.

== Personal life ==
Bodie was born in 1985 in Como, Italy and was born to American businessman Tim Leiweke and an Italian mother. Growing up, she attended Stanford University in the United States, where she studied international relations. The wife of Canadian ice hockey player Troy Bodie, she has two sons.
