= Giovanni Bucaro =

Italian footballer and manager

Personal information
- Full name: Giovanni Bucaro
- Date of birth: 20 November 1970 (age 55)
- Place of birth: Palermo, Italy
- Height: 1.81 m (5 ft 11 1/2 in)
- Position: Defender

Youth career
- Sorrento

Senior career*
Years	Team	Apps	(Gls)
1986–1988	Sorrento	31	(0)
1988–1991	Foggia	41	(2)
1991	Fiorentina	0	(0)
1991–1992	Modena	22	(1)
1992–1993	Bologna	29	(1)
1993–1996	Foggia	43	(1)
1996–1997	SPAL	17	(0)
1997–2000	Ascoli	87	(4)
2000–2003	Avellino	46	(1)
Total		316	(10)

Managerial career
- 2004–2005: Ascoli (assistant)
- 2005–2006: Salernitana (assistant)
- 2006–2007: Campobello
- 2007–2009: Pomigliano
- 2009–2010: Manfredonia
- 2010–2011: Juventus (U19)
- 2011–2012: Avellino
- 2012–2013: Sorrento
- 2014: Savoia
- 2016: Arezzo
- 2017: Monopoli
- 2018–2019: Avellino
- 2019–2020: Sicula Leonzio
- 2020–2021: Bisceglie
- 2021: Bisceglie
- 2024: Pescara
- * Club domestic league appearances and goals

Giovanni Bucaro (born 20 November 1970) is an Italian football manager, and former footballer who played as a defender.

== Career ==
=== Player ===
Bucaro began his playing career with Sorrento. He started with the Rossoneri in their youth team and made 31 appearances for the first team between 1986 and 1988. In 1988, he joined Foggia who were then in the 3rd division of Italian football. In 1989, his second season saw the arrival of manager Zdeněk Zeman, whose aggressive and entertaining style of football saw Foggia enter the most significant period in its history when it eventually reached Serie A in 1991. Zeman achieved promotion to Serie B in his first season, and Bucaro played a crucial role in defence in this promotion-winning team. Following another successful season for Foggia, who achieved promotion to Serie A as champions, Bucaro was sold to Fiorentina. He failed to make an appearance for the Tuscan side and was moved onto Modena in 1991, for whom he made 22 appearances.

Following this solitary season at Modena, he joined Bologna, for whom he made 29 appearances. By 1993, he had rejoined Foggia, for whom he played in their final season in Serie A before they were relegated to Serie B in 1995. Bucaro played another season for Foggia in 1995-1996 when the club finished mid-table. He joined SPAL the following season and made 17 appearances in the 3rd division. Remaining in the lower divisions of Italian football, he joined Ascoli and stayed for three seasons playing 87 league games. He then joined Avellino who were also then in the 3rd division, and between 2000 and 2003, he played 46 games for the club. In his final season with the club, they promoted him to Serie B by defeating Napoli in the playoff final. It was their first time back in the second division in 11 years. This was his final year as a player, and he thus went out on a high note.

=== Manager ===
After spells as assistant manager at both Ascoli and Salernitana, Bucaro began his first venture into management with Campobello in Serie D for the 2006–07 season, and then with Pomigliano. His success with Pomigliano saw him move up a division to manage Manfredonia in the 3rd tier of Italian football. He helped Manfredonia avoid relegation, which caught the attention of Juventus, who invited him to join them as youth team coach for the 2010-2011 season. After spending a year at Juventus he joined Avellino as first team coach in August.

On 21 July 2012 Giovanni Bucaro was announced as the new manager of Sorrento. He was presented to the press and stated that he hoped to emulate his one time manager Zeman in his new role as Sorrento coach. The 2012-2013 season began with a goalless draw against Gubbio and caused Bucaro to immediately lament the lack of a decent striker to help Sorrento's cause. He was sacked in January 2013 due to poor results.

In July 2014, he was named head coach of the newly promoted Lega Pro club Savoia. He was, however, dismissed on 28 October 2014 due to poor results.

In April 2016, he was named the new head coach of Arezzo to replace Ezio Capuano for the last three remaining games of the 2015–16 Lega Pro; his contract was not extended and he left by the end of the season.

He was successively hired as Avellino manager for the club's 2018–19 Serie D campaign, which ended with promotion to Serie C after winning a promotion playoff to Lanusei, as well as the nationwide Serie D championship title. He left Avellino on 24 July 2019 amid uncertainty regarding the club's future.

On 25 October 2019, he was hired by Serie C club Sicula Leonzio until the end of the 2019–20 season. He was dismissed by Sicula Leonzio on 13 January 2020, after the club won just once in 10 games under his helm.

For the 2020–21 season, he was hired by Bisceglie. Bisceglie won 2 out of the first 3 games under him. However, on 1 February 2021, he was dismissed by Bisceglie, after only winning once and gaining 9 points in the next 17 games under his helm. He was called back in charge of Bisceglie just a couple months later, on 6 April, until the end of the season.

On 27 February 2023, he rejoined his former coach Zdeněk Zeman as his assistant at Pescara. On 21 February 2024, following Zeman's resignations for health reasons, Bucaro was promoted new head coach of Pescara for the remainder of the season. His debut on 24 February 2024 was marked by a 1-0 home win over Lucchese. He left the club on 16 March 2024, after a negative string of results during his short stay in charge of the first team.

== Honours ==
=== As a player ===
Foggia

- Serie B (1): 1990–91

Avellino

- Serie C1/B play-off winners (1): 2004–05.

=== As a manager ===
Avellino

- Serie D (1): 2018–19.
