= Francesco Pernigo =

Italian footballer

Personal information
- Full name: Francesco Pernigo
- Date of birth: 10 June 1918
- Place of birth: Verona, Italy
- Date of death: 15 December 1985 (aged 67)
- Place of death: Verona, Italy
- Position: Forward

Senior career*
Years	Team	Apps	(Gls)
1936–1937	Marzotto Valdagno	?	(?)
1937–1938	Audace	4	(2)
1938–1947	Venezia	197	(70)
1947–1949	Modena	68	(28)
1949–1950	Pro Patria	9	(2)
1950–1951	Verona	16	(3)

International career
1948	Italy	2	(5)
- * Club domestic league appearances and goals

Francesco Pernigo (Italian pronunciation: [franˈtʃesko perˈniːɡo]; 10 June 1918 – 15 December 1985) was an Italian footballer who played as a forward. He competed in the men's tournament at the 1948 Summer Olympics with the Italy national football team.

== International goals ==
No.	Date	Venue	Opponent	Score	Result	Competition
1.	2 August 1948	Brentford, Great Britain	United States	1–0	9–0	1948 Summer Olympics
2.	2 August 1948	Brentford, Great Britain	United States	4–0	9–0	1948 Summer Olympics
3.	2 August 1948	Brentford, Great Britain	United States	7–0	9–0	1948 Summer Olympics
4.	2 August 1948	Brentford, Great Britain	United States	8–0	9–0	1948 Summer Olympics
5.	5 August 1948	Highbury, Great Britain	Denmark	3–3	3–5	1948 Summer Olympics
