= Sorrento Calcio 1945 =

Sorrento
- Full name: Sorrento Calcio 1945
- Nicknames: Rossoneri (Red-blacks), Costieri (Coastal)
- Founded: 1945; 81 years ago (as Sorrento Calcio); 2016 (re-founded)
- Ground: Stadio Italia, Sorrento, Italy
- Capacity: 3,600
- Chairman: Giuseppe Cappiello
- Manager: Vincenzo Maiuri
- League: Serie C Group C
- 2025–26: Serie C Group C, 16th of 20
- Website: http://www.fcsorrento.com/
Home colours	Away colours

Sorrento Calcio 1945 is an Italian association football club from Sorrento, Italy, which was founded as Sorrento Calcio in 1945. Currently the club plays in the Serie C Group C, the third tier of Italian club football.

The team lost its affiliation to the FIGC, after being declared bankrupt by a court in Torre Annunziata in September 2016. Since this verdict, Sorrento Football Club was founded by the merger of Atletico Sorrento 5 and Sant'Antonio Abate. The club re-registered to compete in the Eccellenza Campania in 2016–17.

The club has spent most of its history in the lower regions of the Italian football system. Sorrento reached as high as Serie B during the early 1970s, where they recorded their overall highest finish with a 19th place in the 1971–72 season. In addition to this and the championships they have won at lower levels, Sorrento have also won the Serie D Italian Cup.

== History ==
The club was founded in 1945 and after playing lower divisions, they earned the right to be enrolled into the Promozione Campania league for the 1949–50 season. Sorrento finished bottom of the league, in a season which was dominated by stronger local rivals such as Avellino and Casertana.

Under the name Flos Carmeli, which is a Roman Catholic reference to the Blessed Virgin Mary meaning Faith, Love, Obedience and Service, the club returned to the league during the mid-1950s. This time their positioning was more stable, and they had a new ground in the form of Stadio Italia. The name of the Sorrentine club was changed back to the original Sorrento Calcio in 1957.

In the late 1960s, Sorrento began to become far more successful on the field, they achieved successive promotions. First they won Promozione Campania by three points and then in their debut Serie D season of 1968–69 they were champions on goal difference, after finishing level on points with Torre del Greco side Turris.

=== 1970s league success ===
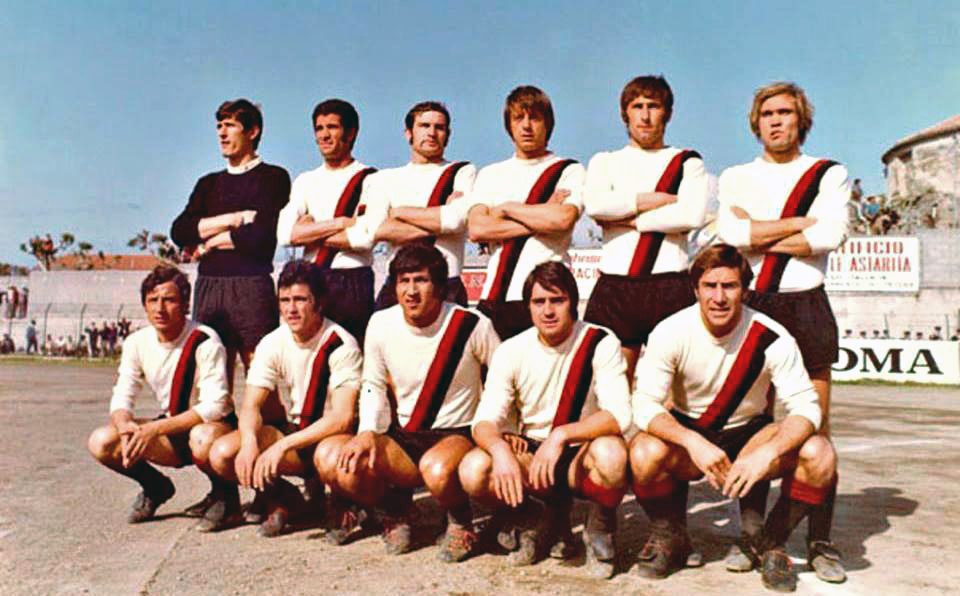
The 1970/71 team.

The side from the province of Naples experienced Serie C level football for the first time in the 1969–70 season. Sorrento achieved a respectable 4th-place finish above more famous clubs such as Lecce and Messina, as well as regional rivals Salernitana and Avellino. In the following season, Sorrento improved further and were crowned champions of Serie C; just one point above Salernitana to clinch the title.

With players such as Giuseppe Bruscolotti in the squad, Sorrento were entered into Serie B for the 1971–72 season. It was considered a huge achievement for the small provincial side to reach the division in the first place; many of the teams who they played against had a larger stadium capacity than the entire population of Sorrento.

Although they finished second from bottom and were relegated by the end of the season, Sorrento recorded several very good results. The most impressive was a 4–0 victory against Brescia on 30 April 1972. They also beat Livorno twice, and Bari 1–0 away.

After their relegation Sorrento were unable to bounce back, instead being forced to battle it out in Serie C during the 1970s from then on; the highest position they were able to end a season with was a 4th place in 1975–76 sandwiched between Bari and Messina. For 1978–79 the league system was slightly reorganised and the club were placed into Serie C2; the fourth level of Italian football. A runners-up spot was achieved in 1984–85, where Sorrento finished just one point behind champions Licata of Sicily; the runners-up spot was enough to give Sorrento promotion up into Serie C1.

=== Decline ===
Sorrento were relegated from Serie C1, at the bottom of the table during their first season, for the rest of the 1980s Sorrento were down in Serie C2. A further slide came in 1989–90 when they were put down into Campionato Interregionale (today's equivalent is Serie D), it is presumed this was due to financial reasons as Sorrento actually finished 5th in Serie C2 the season prior to that.

The now deflated Sorrento were relegated from the Interregionale league in 1990–91 with a 15th-place finish, the club was put into the Promozione Campano league. They missed out on promotion to Boscoreale, the following season Sorrento finished as runners-up to Gragnano and were thus not promoted once more. Finally at the third attempt, Sorrento Calcio achieved their promotion out of the Promozione Campano league via winning the championship of 1993–94.

=== Revival: mid-1990s onwards ===
The club were now in Eccellenza Campania and spent their first three seasons in the league within the top 7 places. Under the coaching of Amato, Sorrento were victorious and crowned Ecellenza winners in 1997–98. They were entered into C.N.D. (which was the name of what is today Serie D), Sorrento were consistent in their first two seasons back in the league, ending the seasons 5th and 6th respectively.

2001–02 was a blip on the map for the Sorrento Calcio revival, they finished 14th, tied on points with a club that was relegated that season; Internapoli. The club managed to turn things around in following seasons, and by 2005–06 achieved a double, they were crowned champions of Serie D and also won the Coppa Italia Serie D.

Sorrento competed in Serie C2 during the 2006–07 season, they were crowned champions beating out Benevento by one point; Francesco Ripa finished as the league's top scorer with 23 goals.

=== From 2007–08 to now ===
Sorrento competed in the Italian 3rd division during the 2007–08 season and managed to maintain their status by finishing in 10th place 10 points away from the relegation positions. Their status in the division was further consolidated in the following season although the side only finished 1 point above the relegation positions in 11th place. This position was improved upon in the 2009–2010 season where the team finished in 9th position, although again only 3 points above a relegation place. This season saw the arrival of Paulinho who scored 15 goals in 33 games on loan from Livorno, it was the following season, however, when he would really hit the headlines and achieve cult status in Sorrento.

==== 2010–11 season ====
At the start of the 2010–11 season, Sorrento were top of the table Serie C1 by November, and faced a strong possibility of promotion to Serie B. This was largely due to the goals scored by Paulinho Betanin who had weighed in with 24 league goals (in 29 games) by the end of the season. Promotion was not forthcoming, however, and by finishing the season in second place Sorrento qualified for the play-offs. Betanin was injured for the final games of the season and did not feature in the play-offs. For the semi-final they drew Hellas Verona and were unlucky to lose the first leg 2–0 away at the Bentegodi. The second leg saw a 1–1 draw at Stadio Italia and by losing 3–1 on aggregate Sorrento did not qualify for the play-off final. While Sorrento had not played well enough over the two legs to reach the final, the second leg was marred by controversy. According to a local newspaper the visiting fans of Hellas Verona (a team strongly associated with hooliganism in Italy) disrespected the minute's silence for fallen Italian soldiers in Afghanistan and proceeded to shout racist chants at Sorrento's Senegalese player Niang. Following the game, as recounted in the local newspaper Positano, many local shops were apparently the scene of violence as the Verona fans rampaged the streets. Sorrento failed in their bid for promotion to serie B.

==== 2011–12 season ====
It had a two-point deduction for the start of the involvement in a match fixing scandal involving Juve Stabia. This was a separate issue from the scandal that involved the higher profile Italian clubs in 2011. Despite this deduction Sorrento performed well for much of the 2011–2012 season and by February 2012 lay in 5th place, with star striker Ciro Ginestra leading the way with 13 goals in 22 games. The local derby at home vs Avellino also saw a return for the club legend Paulinho who was in the stands for the game and was greeted like a returning king by the tifosi. Ginestra went on to score 21 goals in the Lega Pro, becoming Capocannoniere, including two goals against Pro Vercelli on the penultimate game of the season.

The team failed in their second successive year to gain promotion to Serie B, however, despite finishing 4th and qualifying for the play-offs. They drew Carpi Carpi for the two-legged semi final and lost the first leg 1–0 at home. The second leg was played away at Carpi in Emilia Romangna on 27 May 2012, and although Sorrento triumphed 1–0 (goal by Carlini), it was not enough to see them through to the play-off final. As Carpi had finished higher in the league than Sorrento they were awarded a place in the final and Sorrento were confined to the Lega Pro for a further season. The Manager Ruotolo expressed his regret at the result and that Sorrento and their fans deserved better.

==== 2012–13 season ====
On 8 June 2012, twelve days after the play-off defeat, disaster struck the club as the incumbent president Mario Gambardella announced his decision to step down with immediate effect and for the club to be placed into the hands of the Mayor of the town Giuseppe Cuomo. He cited the then difficult financial situation as the reason behind his decision to step down. This came as a massive shock to the club and due to these unplanned and extreme circumstances many players (including Ginestra) and the manager left the club over the course of the summer. The club managed to stay afloat and to register for the 2012–2013 season thanks to the financial backing of its sponsors and the guidance of Cuomo, but there was serious doubt over whether the club would be able to continue unless a new president was found. After a turbulent few weeks Sorrento emerged with a new president, but the crisis had caused problems with them as tenants of Stadio Italia in Sorrento and until this could be cleared up Sorrento Calcio would have to play their home games at the Simonetta Lamberti stadium the home of neighbours Pro Cavese in Cava de' Tirreni. The club presented its new manager Giovanni Bucaro to the fans and media on 21 July 2012 at the Hotel Continental in Sorrento. Sorrento Calcio began their season with a 0–0 draw at home to Gubbio. The season was not a success and the Rossoneri found themselves in 15th position out of 16 at the end of the season which led them to play in the play out round. After a two-leg contest against Prato, Sorrento lost 2–1 on aggregate and were relegated from the Lega Pro Prima Divisione to the Seconda Divisione.

==== 2013–14 season ====
Following their relegation from the Lega Pro, Sorrento played the 2013–2014 season in Group I of the Serie D. In June there was speculation that the club could be bought by one time owner of Juve Stabia, Franco Giglio. Giglio would indeed go onto acquire the club, but not until June 2015, the following year. On 24 July 2013 Sorrento hired Luca Chiappino who had been the youth team manager at Genoa. The season did not start well but Sorrento did spend some time in the top half of the table. Chiappino did not last long, however, and on 25 November he was sacked after the decisive defeat to Martina Franca after 3 wins, 3 draws and 7 defeats which left the Rossoneri fourth from bottom and in the relegation zone. The club then turned to Giovanni Simonelli, the manager that had brought them success only a few years before. He was appointed on 27 November 2013. After a 4th consecutive defeat in February 2014, Simonelli felt the team deserved more luck over the course of the four games, especially with regards refereeing decisions. However, he said the players and the club had to believe in themselves to get out of this difficult run. Despite finishing 9th and missing out on promotion to the Lega Pro Primera Divisione by one point, Sorrento found themselves in the play out round. The play out match saw Sorrento Calcio relegated from the Lega Pro C2/B following a 4-3 aggregate loss to Arzanese.

==== 2014–15 season ====
The 2014–2015 season was similarly disappointing, with the club hovering around the relegation zone for much of the year. They managed to finish 14th which led to them playing in the relegation play out match. They played Battipagliese in a match which they lost 2–1. This resulted in their 3rd consecutive relegation, this time down to the Eccellenza Campania. In terms of ownership, the on-off-on-off acquisition by Giglio was finally completed in June 2015. Explaining this delay of about a year in making his investment, Giglio stated that the decline in attendance figures and financial issues at the club had affected his decision.

==== 2015–16 season ====
Sorrento began the 2015/2016 season in the Eccellenza Campania. This was a truly disastrous campaign for the Rossoneri who finished bottom of the league table after having failed to win a single game, drawing 5 and losing the other 25. The club went bankrupt.

==== 2016–17 season ====
A new club was soon created and it bought F.C. Sant'Antonio Abate. Mario Turi was appointed manager at the start of the season and initially did well. However, he was replaced in December 2016 by Maurizio Coppola. As of 24 January 2017 they currently lie in 2nd place and on course for a play off position, having won 10 of their 17 games.

==== 2017–18 season ====
Having failed to gain promotion in season 16/17, Sorrento began the season in the Eccellenza Campania once again. They finished 1st in Group B and subsequently gained promotion to Serie D Group H.

==== 2018–19 season ====
Season 18/19 was Sorrento's first season back in Serie D. They began the season with a 1-0 home win against Gragnano, and went on to achieve 12 wins, 7 draws & 15 losses throughout the season. Sorrento finished the campaign in 10th place.

==== 2019–20 season ====
After a mid-table finish the year before, Sorrento began the season once again in Serie D Group H. They started poorly, gaining just one point from their opening three fixtures. Sorrento's form did improve, however, and they started to pick up more and more points. A notable 7–0 victory over Casarano was achieved in round 24 which placed Sorrento firmly in 3rd place and on course to achieve a promotion play-off spot for Serie C. However, the COVID-19 pandemic took hold as it did everywhere, and Italy ended up one of the worst-affected countries in the world. Serie D was called early as a result, with Sorrento finishing 3rd after 26 matches. Due to the early finish, though, Sorrento did not get to compete in the promotion play-offs, meaning they remained in Serie D for season 20/21.

==== 2020–21 season ====
Sorrento began the season with a 2–1 home win against A.C.D. Nardò on 27 September 2020, and went on a 6-game unbeaten run. The club was impacted by the COVID pandemic mid-season meaning they had to postpone a number of games. They played on 10 January 2021 and then not again until 10 February 2021, meaning they had to play catch up on numerous rescheduled matches. As of 1 April 2021, Sorrento sit 10th of 18 teams in Serie D Group H on 31 points.

== Current squad ==
As of 1 September 2026

Note: Flags indicate national team as defined under FIFA eligibility rules; some limited exceptions apply. Players may hold more than one non-FIFA nationality.

No.	Pos.	Nation	Player
2	DF	ITA	Mattia Puzone
3	MF	ITA	Luca Crecco
4	MF	ITA	Jacopo Bacci
5	DF	ITA	Riccardo Cargnelutti (on loan from Catania)
6	DF	ITA	Francesco Fusco
7	FW	ITA	Ernesto Starita
8	MF	ITA	Marco Cuccurullo
10	FW	ITA	Federico Ricci
11	DF	ITA	Marco Falasca
13	GK	ITA	Ludovico Del Sorbo
15	DF	ITA	Daniele Solcia
18	MF	ITA	Manuel Tonni
19	FW	ITA	Alessandro Bolzan

No.	Pos.	Nation	Player
21	MF	ITA	Antonio Potenza
22	GK	ITA	Simon Harrasser
23	MF	ITA	Simone Cangianiello
24	DF	ITA	Nicolò Evangelisti
26	DF	ITA	Vincenzo Di Somma
28	MF	ITA	Leonardo Capezzi
31	DF	ITA	Giovanni Castaldi (on loan from Benevento)
32	MF	ITA	Stefano Paglino
33	DF	ITA	Angelo Viscardi (on loan from Benevento)
99	MF	ITA	Federico Marchesi
—	DF	ITA	Ciro Loreto
—	FW	ITA	Sean Parker (on loan from Lecco)

== Club badge, colours and kits ==
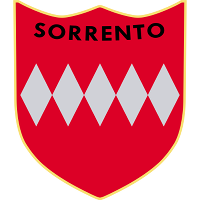
The second of two new badges used temporarily by the club

Sorrento's main colours are red and black - hence the nickname Rossoneri (Italian for the red & blacks). Their home kit is often red and black stripes, similar in style to AC Milan - a partner club of Sorrento who, until recently, made use of Sorrento's academy and good record and producing young talent such as Ciro Immobile. Sorrento's away kits are often white or occasionally yellow. 'Zeus' are Sorrento's main technical sponsors and exclusively produce the Rossoneri's shirts. The Mediterranean Shipping Company are long-time sponsors of Sorrento, and their yellow 'MSC' logo can be found as the main sponsor on Sorrento's shirts.

The Sorrento Calcio shield was historically used for many years until the club's bankruptcy in September 2015. When the team was re-founded as A.S.D Sorrento in 2016, other badges had to be created and used. The first maintained the 'shield' shape but included a mermaid and the name "Football Club Sorrento" - the historic five diamonds were relegated to the bottom of the badge. The second badge was a slightly different shape, simply saying "Sorrento" across the top with the five diamonds across the middle.

In March 2021 it was announced that the "shield comes home". The newly formed Sorrento United 1945 - Supporters' Trust had bought ownership of the bankrupt Sorrento Calcio brand and granted exclusive use of the old badge to the club free of charge. The significance of the return of the old, historic badge is felt throughout the support as it had been a symbol of the club for many years, and fans feel as though the identity of Sorrento has been restored. Soon after the return of the shield, Sorrento announced a new kit for 2021 which drew inspiration from Sorrento kits of the 1980s by reverting to thinner black stripes and reinstating the Sorrento Calcio badge.

== Stadium ==
Sorrento play their home matches at Stadio Italia, located by the port.

The stadium was renovated in 2003 and has a capacity of 3,600.

== Staff ==
As of 1 April 2021

- Manager: Pino La Scala
- Assistant Manager: Marco Attanasio
- Trainer: Salvatore D'Andrea
- Goalkeeping Coach: Ferdinando Uliano
- Physio: Giancarlo Colonna
- Doctor: Epifano D'Arrigo
- Masseur: Marco Gargiulo
- Masseur: Francesco Ostieri

== Managerial history ==
Dates	Name	Nationality
1946–1947	Luciano Berardelli	(Italy)
1947–1948	Roberto Di Martino	(Italy)
1948–1949	Gaetano Marrese	(Italy)
1949–1950	Salvatore Sacco	(Italy)
1950–1952	Giuseppe Gargiulo	(Italy)
1952–1953	Ferruccio Scappini	(Italy)
1953–1954	Mario De Palma	(Italy)
1954–1955	Saverio Salvioli	(Italy)
1955–1957	Secondo Rossi	(Italy)
1957–1958	Nicola Massi	(Italy)
1958–1960	Giuseppe D'Alessandro	(Italy)
1960–1961	Cardone	(Italy)
1961–1962	Ruggero Zanolla	(Italy)
1962–1963	Giuseppe D'Alessandro	(Italy)
1963–1964	Italo Romagnoli	(Italy)
1964–1967	Antonio Giglio Cobuzio	(Italy)
1967–1969	Gennaro Rambone	(Italy)
1969–1970	Paolo Todeschini	(Italy)
1970–1971	Giancarlo Vitali	(Italy)
1971–1972	Nicola D'Alessio Monte	(Italy)
1972–1973	Paolo Todeschini	(Italy)
1973–1974	Pietro Santin	(Italy)
1974–1975	Bruno Bolchi	(Italy)
1975–1976	Luigi Raffin	(Italy)
1976–1977	Ettore Recagni	(Italy)
1977–1978	Giancarlo Vitali	(Italy)
1978–1979	Luigi Raffin	(Italy)
1979–1980	Giancarlo Vitali	(Italy)
1980–1981	Francesco Paolo Specchia	(Italy)
1981–1982	Paolo Franzoni	(Italy)

Dates	Name	Nationality
1982–1983	Urano Benigni Navarrini	(Italy)
1983–1984	Antonio Giglio Cobuzio	(Italy)
1984–1985	Carmine Tascone	(Italy)
1985–1987	Jarbas Faustinho	(Brazil)
1987–1988	Giuseppe Papadopulo	(Italy)
1988–1989	Salvatore Di Somma	(Italy)
1989–1990	Antonio Giglio Cobuzio	(Italy)
1990–1991	Flaminio De Biase	(Italy)
1991–1992	Gaetano Miniero	(Italy)
1992–1993	Bruno Govetto	(Italy)
1993–1995	Enrico Vendittelli	(Italy)
1995–1996	Natalino Attardi	(Italy)
1996–1997	Enrico Vendittelli	(Italy)
1997–2001	Salvatore Amato	(Italy)
2001–2002	Gaetano Musella	(Italy)
2002–2003	Pasquale Esposito	(Italy)
2003–2004	Salvatore Amato	(Italy)
2004–2005	Giuseppe La Scala	(Italy)
2005–2007	Renato Cioffi	(Italy)
2007–2008	Nicola Provenza	(Italy)
2008–2011	Giovanni Simonelli	(Italy)
2011–2012	Maurizio Sarri	(Italy)
2011–2012	Gennaro Ruotolo	(Italy)
2012–2013	Giovanni Bucaro	(Italy)
2013–2014	Luca Chiappino	(Italy)
2014–2015	Roberto Sosa	(Argentina)
2015–2016	Dario Rocco	(Italy)
2016	Mario Turi	(Italy)
2016–2017	Maurizio Coppola	(Italy)
2017–2019	Antonio Guarracino	(Italy)
2019–2020	Vincenzo Maiuri	(Italy)
2020–2021	Luca Fusco	(Italy)
2021-	Pino La Scala	(Italy)

== Honours ==
- Serie C: 1
  - Champions: 1970–71
- Serie C2: 1
  - Champions: 2006–07
  - Runners-up: 1984–85
- Serie D: 2
  - Champions: 1968–69, 2005–06
- Coppa Italia Serie C: 1
  - Champions: 2008–09
- Coppa Italia Serie D: 1
  - Champions: 2005–06
- Eccellenza Campania: 1
  - Champions: 1997–98
- Promozione Campania: 2
  - Champions: 1967–68, 1993–94
  - Runners-up: 1992–93

== Notable former players ==
(this list only contains players who have made appearances for their respective national sides or who have made notable contributions to management)

- (Bulgaria) Andrey Galabinov
- (Italy) Ciro Immobile
- (Albania) Florian Myrtaj
- (Italy) Massimo Rastelli
- (Romania) Claudiu Răducanu
- (Italy) Gennaro Ruotolo
