= Venezia FC =

Italian football club

Venezia
- Full name: Venezia Football Club S.r.l.
- Nicknames: I Leoni Alati (The Winged Lions); I Lagunari (The Lagoonal Ones); Gli Arancioneroverdi (The Orange-Black-Greens)
- Founded: 14 December 1907; 118 years ago, as Venezia Foot Ball Club; 2005; 21 years ago, as Società Sportiva Calcio Venezia; 2009; 17 years ago, as Foot Ball Club Unione Venezia; 21 July 2015; 11 years ago, as Venezia Football Club
- Stadium: Stadio Pier Luigi Penzo
- Capacity: 12,048
- Owner(s): VFC Newco 2023 LLC (Tim Leiweke, Francesca Bodie and Keegan McDonald)
- President: Francesca Bodie
- Head coach: Davide Nicola
- League: Serie A
- 2025–26: Serie B, 1st of 20 (promoted)
- Website: veneziafc.it
Home colours	Away colours	Third colours

Venezia Football Club is an Italian professional football club based in Venice, Veneto, that currently plays in Serie A, the first tier of Italian football.

Originally founded as Venezia Foot Ball Club in 1907, the club have spent a large part of their history in Italy's top two divisions.

Venezia's biggest achievement to date was winning the Coppa Italia in the 1940–41 season. They followed this cup success up with their highest Serie A finish of third place in the following season.

== History ==
=== Foundation and early years ===
14 December 1907 in Venice by about 20 enthusiasts through the merger of the football sections of two Venetian sports clubs: the Martial Gymnastics Society and Costantino Reyer. The place chosen by the founders to give life to the new football club was the restaurant "Da Nane in Corte dell'Orso" near Campo San Bortolomio. Among the founders were Davide Fano, the first president; Walter Aemissegger, from Swiss club FC Winterthur, the first coach and captain; Guido Battisti; Antonio Borella; Gerardo Bortoletti; Aldo Federici, known as "Baciccia"; Pietro Golzio, known as "Pioppa"; Silvio Lorenzetti, Pietro Piccoli; Primo Pitteri; Alessandro Santi; Marcello Santi; Luigi Vianello; Pietro Visintin; and Mario Vivante.

In its early years, the club's matches were played in the pine forest of Sant'Elena. Venezia's first matches were played against the Veneto teams of Padova, Verona, and Vicenza, as well as against the crews of the ships arriving at the port of Venice. Venezia's first match was played on 22 December 1907, against Vicenza, ending 1–1.

Venezia participated in Italy's top division for the first time in the 1909 Italian Football Championship. As the only Veneto club, Venezia were directly admitted to the semifinals against the winners of the Lombardia group, US Milanese, and lost the first leg 7–1 and the return leg 11–2.

Venezia participated in the Prima Categoria, Italy's top division, from the 1910–11 season through the 1914–15 season, which would be the last season played before Italy entered World War I.

In the 1911–12 season, Venezia won the Veneto-Emilian group and reached the national final against Pro Vercelli, losing 7–0 in the first leg and 6–0 in the second leg.

On 7 September 1913, Campo Sportivo Comunale di Sant’Elena, the Venetian stadium on the island of Sant'Elena, later to be named Stadio Pier Luigi Penzo, was opened, complete with a covered grandstand for more than 500 spectators. Venezia lost the inaugural match to Genoa, 0–7.

In the 1914–15 season, Venezia qualified for the semifinals, and finished fourth in Group A, before the season was suspended due to the war.

=== 1919 to 1939 ===
==== AC Venezia ====
In April 1919, at Palazzo Gritti-Faccanon, in the then headquarters of Il Gazzettino, the members of Venezia F.B.C. and the Aurora F.B.C., a minor lagoon club, decided to join forces and rename the club as Associazione Calcio Venezia. On the occasion, the government contributed to the relaunch of the lagoon club with an extraordinary contribution of 40,000 lire, as compensation for having used the sports field as a military base.

In the 1921–22 season, Venezia were relegated to the Seconda Divisione. Venezia returned to the Prima Divisione in the 1926–27 season, however, following the creation of the Divisione Nazionale as the new top flight, the Prima Divisione had become the second level of Italian football.

In the 1927–28 Prima Divisione season, Venezia finished second in Group A behind Atalanta, and were automatically admitted to the Divisione Nazionale by resolution of the Italian Football Federation, which expanded the league to 32 clubs, with two groups of 16 clubs each.

In the 1927–28 Divisione Nazionale season, Venezia finished 11th in Group B and were relegated to Serie B, which began operating in the 1929–30 season. Venezia finished 7th in Serie B that season.

==== SS Serenissima ====
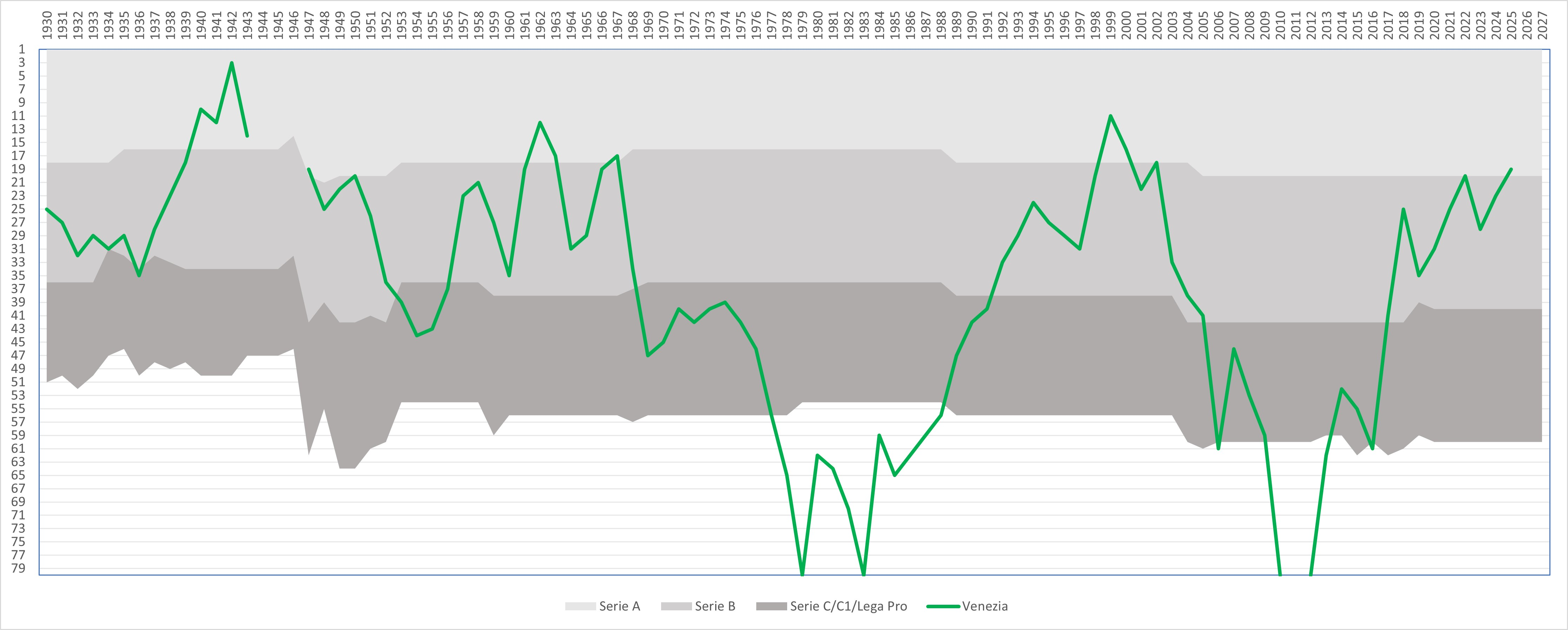
The performance of Venezia in the Italian football league structure since the first season of a unified Serie A (1929/30).

In the summer of 1930, Venezia was renamed Società Sportiva Serenissima, and the club colors were also changed with the adoption of the red of the Flag of the Republic of Venice, while the Lion of Saint Mark was placed on the chest.

In May 1931, on the occasion of the International Women's Gymnastic Competition, the Venetian stadium of Sant'Elena was named after World War I pilot Pier Luigi Penzo.

After five consecutive seasons in Serie B since 1929–30, S.S. Serenissima finished last in Group B in the 1933–34 Serie B season and were set for relegation, but they would keep their place in the league as a result of an expansion from 26 to 32 teams for the following season.

==== AC Venezia and promotion to Serie A ====
On 1 August 1934, the club returned to its former name Associazione Calcio Venezia (albeit with the addition, inevitable at the time, of the adjective Fascista) and its traditional neroverde (black and green) colors.

In the 1934–35 Serie B season, Venezia finished tied for 11th and were relegated to the nascent Serie C. But Venezia's stay in Serie C would be short, as they finished top of the table in the 1935–36 season and earned direct promotion back to Serie B. Venezia also reached the Round of 32 of the 1935–36 Coppa Italia, defeating Padova, Fiumana (now Rijeka), and Pistoiese, before being eliminated by S.S. Lazio, 2–0. The strong point of that team was the mediana di ferro (iron median) of Armando Varini, Aldo Biffi, and Attilo Kossovel.

The following season, Venezia reached the Round of 16 of the 1936–37 Coppa Italia, losing to A.C. Milan, 2–0, and survived a relegation tie-breaker with Pro Vercelli, Messina, and Catania in the 1936-37 Serie B season to keep their place in the league.

In 1937, with the emergence of Arnaldo Bennati as club president, Venezia began a period of ascent. In the 1937–38 Serie B season, Venezia finished 8th in the table, and Bennati would bring in some important players including Víctor Tortora and Giovanni Alberti.

In the 1938–39 Serie B season, Venezia finished second and earned promotion to Serie A, which was achieved in dramatic fashion by defeating Atalanta in Bergamo, 0–1, on the last day of the season and overtaking them for second place despite being tied on points due to a better goal ratio. The winning goal, coming in front of 5,000 Venezia fans, was scored by Francesco Pernigo, who is still Venezia's all-time leading scorer (45) in Serie A. Venezia's manager was Giuseppe Girani.

Venezia's rise to Serie A prompted a new renovation of Stadio Pier Luigi Penzo, with capacity increased from 10,000 to 22,000 after expansion of the existing stands.

=== 1939 to 1968 ===
==== Golden era ====
Upon returning to Serie A after a 12-year absence, the Venezia squad was strengthened, with the arrival of players including Luigi Busidoni, Silvio Di Gennaro, Sergio Stefanini, and, most importantly, Valentino Mazzola. Mazzola was in Venice for military service, and after having showcased himself playing with military representatives in Campo dei Bacini, Venezia took him on trial and then bought him from Serie C club Alfa Romeo Milano. In the 1939–40 Serie A season, Venezia finished 10th in the table — highlighted by a win over eventual champions Ambrosiana Inter in Venice — and took a step towards the two most successful seasons in the club's history.

In 1940, Venezia hired Giovanni Battista Rebuffo as manager and further strengthened the squad with the arrival of Ezio Loik from A.C. Milan, who would form a famous partnership with Valentino Mazzola in Venice. Although they would finish a modest 12th in the 1940–41 Serie A season, Venezia would go on to win the 1940–41 Coppa Italia — the club's first major trophy. Venezia defeated MU Borzacchini in the Round of 32, Udinese in the Round of 16, Bologna in the quarterfinals, and S.S. Lazio in the semifinals, meeting A.S. Roma in the final. After a 3–3 draw in Rome, Venezia won the return leg at Stadio Penzo, 1–0, on a goal from Loik.

The following year, Venezia would make a run for the Scudetto. In the 1941–42 Serie A season, the Loik-Mazzola duo was outstanding, while Francesco Pernigo would score 12 league goals. A few rounds from the end of the season, Venezia faced Roma in a critical match at Stadio Penzo, but Venezia would lose after missing a penalty, and Roma would go on to win the championship on 42 points, with Torino second on 39 points and Venezia third on 38 points. The third-place finish remains Venezia's best-ever result in Serie A. In the 1941–42 Coppa Italia, Venezia defeated Torino in the Round of 32, Pisa in the Round of 16, and Bologna in the quarterfinals, but would lose to A.C. Milan in the semifinals, 2–1.

In the summer of 1942, Venezia sold Loik and Mazzola to Torino, for the then exorbitant figure of 1,200,000 lira. Venezia would struggle in the 1942–43 Serie A season, finishing 14th in the table and needing to defeat Bari in a relegation tie-breaker to remain in Serie A. But in the 1942–43 Coppa Italia, Venezia would reach their second final in three years. In the final, Venezia would lose to Torino, 4–0, with Mazzola scoring against his former club.

After the 1942–43 season, football competitions in Italy were suspended due to World War II.

==== Postwar period ====
After World War II, Venezia reestablished its name as Associazione Calcio Venezia.

In Italy, national football resumed with the 1945–46 Italian Football Championship, and Venezia struggled, finishing 13th in the table. Serie A was restored in the 1946–47 season, and despite the 13 goals by Valeriano Ottino (the most goals in a Serie A season by a Venezia player) Venezia were relegated to Serie B. At the same time, Arnaldo Bennati would leave the presidency. Following the highest point in the club's history, a period of uncertainty began.

After finishing in fourth in Serie B in the 1947–48 season, sporting director Giuseppe Girani and manager Mario Villini led Venezia to promotion back to Serie A in the 1948–49 season, finishing second, just one point ahead of Vicenza.

But Venezia faced serious financial uncertainty, to the point that in the 1949–50 Serie A season the club was chaired by a local council. Venezia were forced to sell goalscorer Adriano Zecca to Roma, and did not have the quality to compete in the top flight, finishing last with only 16 points. In the summer of 1950, Mario Renosto was sold to A.C. Milan, and he immediately won the Scudetto with the rossoneri the following season.

Upon falling back to Serie B, Venezia would finish a modest sixth in the table in the 1950–51 season despite 20 goals from Pietro Broccini, who would leave for Inter Milan in the summer.

In the 1951–52 season, Venezia would be relegated to Serie C, and they would spend four seasons in the third tier, before earning promotion back to Serie B in the 1956–57 season under manager Carlo Alberto Quario.

Despite still playing in Serie B, Venezia would make an impressive run in the 1958–59 Coppa Italia, eliminating Roma and Torino on their way to the semifinals, where they would lose to Inter, and then lose a third place match with Genoa. At the end of the season, manager Carlo Alberto Quario would leave the bench, and Venezia would narrowly avoid another relegation to Serie C in the 1959-60 season, surviving a relegation tie-breaker with Monza and Taranto.

In the 1960–61 Serie B season, entrepreneur Anacleto Ligabue took over as extraordinary commissioner of the club, and he immediately recalled Carlo Alberto Quario to the bench. It would be a winning move, as Venezia finished top of the table, and returned to Serie A after an 11-year absence. The promotion-winning team featured the young Venetian Gianni Rossi plus new arrivals Virginio De Paoli, Sergio Frascoli, Gianni Grossi, and striker Luigi Raffin, who scored 17 goals during the year. The triumph was celebrated with a procession of gondolas escorting the bissona Serenissima, the traditional Venetian ship, carrying the players from Stadio Penzo to Piazza San Marco.

On Venezia's return to Serie A in the 1961–62 season, Count Giovanni Volpi di Misurata became club president, with Ligabue and Enrico Linetti as his deputies. Although the team got off to a slow start, Venezia would ultimately put together a respectable campaign, earning wins over Juventus and A.C. Milan, and finishing 12th in the table. The team featured midfielder Juan Santisteban who had arrived from Real Madrid, while Raffin would score 11 goals during the season.

But in the 1962–63 Serie A season, Venezia finished 17th in the table and were again relegated to Serie B. At the end of the season, there would be several departures, including Carlo Alberto Quario and Gino Raffin, who had scored 39 goals in total in the previous three seasons.

After three seasons in Serie B, Venezia earned promotion to Serie A once again, finishing first in the 1965–66 Serie B season. But in the 1966–67 Serie A season, Venezia were directly relegated back to Serie B, and they would not see the top flight again for more than 30 years. In the following 1967–68 Serie B season, Venezia would be relegated to Serie C.

=== 1968 to 1986 ===
Following the relegation from Serie B in 1968, Venezia would languish in Serie C, Serie C1, Serie C2, and Serie D through the 1980s.

=== 1987 to 2005 ===
==== Maurizio Zamparini arrival and merger with Mestre ====
Ahead of the 1986–87 season, Venezia was acquired by businessman Maurizio Zamparini, who would lead the club for the next 16 seasons.

After his first season in charge, Zamparini would merge Venezia with mainland club A.C. Mestre, who were also playing in Serie C2. The merger was executed on 26 June 1987. Zamparini temporarily changed the name of the club to Calcio VeneziaMestre, though the club would be renamed Associazione Calcio Venezia in November 1989. With the merger, the club's colors changed from neroverde (green-black) to arancioneroverde (orange-black-green). Further, the team's home matches were moved from Stadio Penzo in Venice to Stadio Francesco Baracca in Mestre.

In the 1987–88 season, Venezia achieved promotion from Serie C2 to Serie C1, returning to the third tier for the first time since the 1976–77 season.

Over the next two seasons, the team — featuring players including Andrea Poggi, Giancarlo Filippini, and a young Paolo Poggi — steadily improved, and built towards a return to Serie B.

==== Return to Serie B ====
In the 1990–91 season, Venezia, under manager Alberto Zaccheroni, earned promotion back to Serie B after a 23-year absence. In a playoff for second place, Venezia defeated Como, 2–1, with 7,000 fans from Venice and Mestre attending the match in Cesena.

Due to the insufficient capacity at Stadio Baracca in Mestre for Serie B, Venezia would move back to Stadio Penzo in Venice, renovating and expanding the stadium, with the elimination of the athletics track.

Venezia would spend the next seven seasons in Serie B, before finally achieving promotion.

==== Return to Serie A ====
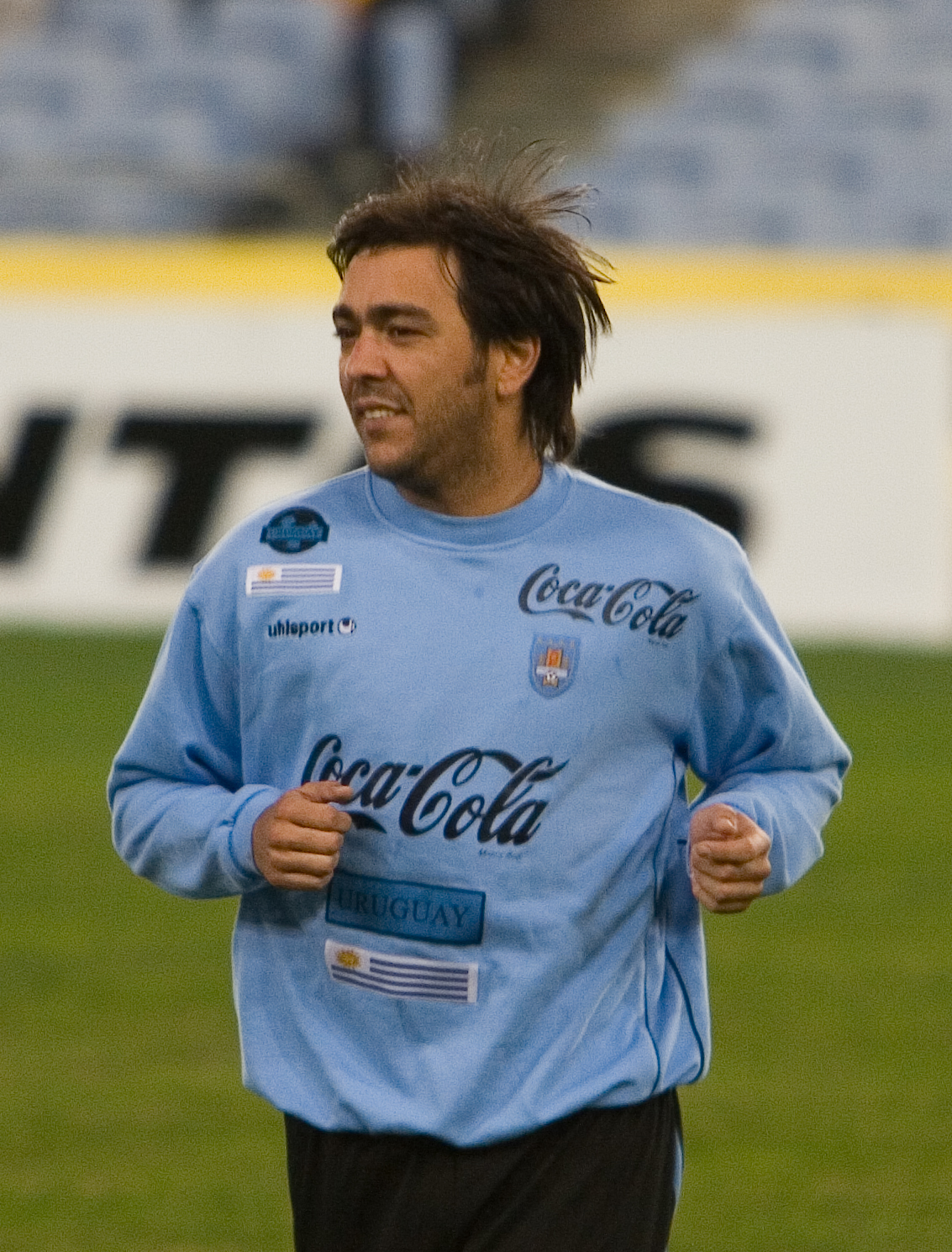
Álvaro Recoba played for Venezia.

In the 1997–98 Serie B season, Venezia, under manager Walter Novellino, finished second in the table and earned promotion back to Serie A after a 31-year absence.

Ahead of the 1998–99 Serie A season, sporting director Beppe Marotta would strengthen the team, including the double signing of striker Filippo Maniero and goalkeeper Massimo Taibi from A.C. Milan. Through the first half of the season, though, Venezia were bottom of the table, and Maniero hadn't scored a goal. But a turning point came in January with the arrival of young playmaker Álvaro Recoba on loan from Inter Milan. Maniero and Recoba would form a prolific partnership in attack, scoring 23 goals between them in the second half of the season — Maniero with 12, Recoba with 11 — and gradually pulling Venezia out of the relegation zone. In the penultimate week of the season, Venezia needed a win against Recoba's parent club Inter to preserve their Serie A status, and Recoba contributed a goal and an assist in a 3–1 win, as Venezia completed the comeback and finished in 11th place, four points above the relegation zone.

Going into the 1999–2000 Serie A season, Venezia replaced Novellino with Luciano Spalletti. But without Recoba, Venezia would struggle. During the campaign, they would go through three coaches — Spalletti was sacked in the fall, then recalled after Giuseppe Materazzi lasted just 27 days, until Francesco Oddo was hired in February. Venezia would make a run in the 1999–2000 Coppa Italia, eliminating Udinese and Fiorentina among others on their way to the semifinals, where they were finally beaten by Lazio, but that form wouldn't carry over to league play. Venezia ultimately finished 16th and were relegated to Serie B.

For the 2000–01 Serie B season, Venezia hired manager Cesare Prandelli, and he would lead Venezia right back to Serie A. But it wouldn't last, as Prandelli was let go early into the 2001–02 Serie A season, and Venezia would go on to finish last and suffer its second relegation in three years.

==== Zamparini exit, relegation, and bankruptcy ====
On 21 July 2002, Zamparini left Venezia and took over Palermo. The following day, in a move called the furto di Pergine — the "theft of Pergine" — Zamparini has 12 players plus manager Ezio Glerean withdrawn by bus from Venezia's preseason camp in Pergine Valsugana and taken to Palermo's preseason camp in Longarone. In the mass transfer, Palermo took goalkeeper Generoso Rossi, defenders Fabio Bilica, Kewullay Conteh and Francesco Modesto, midfielders Valentino Lai, Antonio Marasco, Stefano Morrone, Frank Olivier Ongfiang, Mario Santana and Evans Soligo (later returned to Venice), and strikers Arturo Di Napoli and Filippo Maniero. A few days later, striker Igor Budan and the sporting director Rino Foschi also moved from Venezia to Palermo.

Venezia finished 15th in the 2002–03 Serie B season, then 20th in the 2003–04 Serie B season, surviving a relegation playoff by defeating Bari, 2–1 on aggregate. But the club's financial situation could not be saved.

At the end of the 2004–05 Serie B season, Venezia was relegated and declared bankrupt.

=== 2005 to 2015 ===
==== Società Sportiva Calcio Venezia ====
In the summer of 2005, the club was re-founded as Società Sportiva Calcio Venezia and was admitted to Serie C2 by Lodo Petrucci. In the 2005–06 Serie C2 season, Venezia earned promotion to Serie C1, and would spend the next three seasons in the third tier, but the club would be declared bankrupt once again by the end of the 2008–09 season.

==== Foot Ball Club Unione Venezia ====
In the summer of 2009, with Venice in danger of being a city without a football club, mayor Massimo Cacciari personally supervised the foundation of a new club. On 27 July 2009, the club was re-founded as Foot Ball Club Unione Venezia, recognized as the legitimate successor of SSC Venezia, and was admitted to Serie D. Venezia won Serie D in the 2011–12 season and earned promotion from Lega Pro Seconda Divisione to Lega Pro Prima Divisione in the 2012–13 season, but would last just two seasons in the third tier before going bankrupt for the third time in 10 years.

=== 2015 to Present ===
==== Venezia FC ====
In September 2015, a group of American investors led by attorney Joe Tacopina moved to acquire the club out of bankruptcy, and re-founded the club as Venezia FC. In the 2015–16 season, Venezia earned promotion from Serie D to Serie C.

==== Filippo Inzaghi tenure ====
In June 2016, Venezia hired Filippo Inzaghi as manager. The former Italian national team star's previous managerial experience was with A.C. Milan in 2014–15.

In Inzaghi's first season, the 2016–17 Lega Pro season, Venezia earned promotion to Serie B and won the Coppa Italia Serie C. The Serie C title was secured on 19 April 2017, after beating Parma to top spot.

In the 2017–18 Serie B season, Venezia's first at that level for 12 years, the club was a surprise contender for promotion to Serie A, managing to finish fifth in the table. This was their highest Serie B finish since ending the 2000–01 season in fourth place, when they were last promoted to the top-flight. In the first round of the Serie B promotion playoffs, Venezia defeated Perugia 3–0 at the Stadio Pier Luigi Penzo to advance to the semi-finals. However, the club then lost to Palermo due to a 1–0 defeat in the away leg, and was knocked out by a 2–1 aggregate scoreline.

In June 2018, Inzaghi decided to leave Venezia, and he would later join Bologna.

==== Joe Tacopina exit ====
After Inzaghi's departure, Venezia went through three coaches in the 2018–19 Serie B season — Stefano Vecchi, Walter Zenga, and Serse Cosmi — and finished 15th in the table. After losing the Serie B relegation play-out to Salernitana, Venezia were set for relegation to Serie C, but they were ultimately spared when Palermo were punished with relegation due to "administrative non-compliance."

Ahead of the 2019–20 Serie B season, Venezia hired Alessio Dionisi as manager. In February 2020, with the team in another relegation battle, Venezia was recapitalized and the club's ownership removed Joe Tacopina as club president.

==== VFC Newco and Duncan Niederauer ====
Upon the club's reorganization, Venezia owner Duncan Niederauer, former CEO of the New York Stock Exchange, took on the role of club president. The following month, the 2019–20 Serie B season was suspended due to the COVID-19 pandemic in Italy, but would resume in June. When the season resumed, Venezia would lose just two of their final 10 matches, and defeated Perugia on the final day of the season to remain in Serie B, finishing 11th in the league table, five points clear of the relegation play-out.

==== Return to Serie A ====
In August 2020, Venezia rebuilt its technical staff, hiring former long-time Venezia players and local Venetians Mattia Collauto and Paolo Poggi as sporting director and technical director, respectively, a young American Alex Menta as analytics director, and Vicenza-born Paolo Zanetti as manager.

In the 2020–21 Serie B season, Venezia finished fifth in the table, again qualifying for the promotion playoffs to Serie A. In the promotion playoff first round, Venezia defeated Chievo Verona thanks to an extra-time goal from Dennis Johnsen, winning the tie 3–2. The first leg of Venezia's semi-final match against Lecce was settled by a single goal from star striker Francesco Forte, who was particularly crucial to the club's promotion push with 15 goals in the regular season, with a 1–1 tie in the away leg enabling the club to advance. In the final, Venezia met A.S. Cittadella for a place in Serie A. A 1–0 away win at their opponents' Stadio Pier Cesare Tombolato and the following 1–1 result at home, with a late equaliser from veteran forward Riccardo Bocalon, secured Venezia's first season in Serie A in 19 years. This achievement also marked a rapid rise for the club from Serie D to Serie A in only five years.

Venezia celebrated their return to Serie A with a parade of historical boats, rowing clubs, and gondolas on the Grand Canal.

On 9 August 2021, the club broke its transfer record with the signing of American midfielder Gianluca Busio for $6.5 million (€5.7 million). The club's first match back in Serie A was a 2–0 defeat against Napoli on 22 August 2021. However, the club's time in Serie A would be short-lived, as they would be again relegated to Serie B at the end of the season.

==== Beteween Serie B and Serie A: 2022–present ====
For the 2022–23 Serie B season, the club acquired Ivan Javorčić as the new head coach. They strengthened their roster with a former Bayer Leverkusen striker Joel Pohjanpalo and former Brescia goalkeeper Jesse Joronen, in hopes of a quick return to top level. The season started slow, and eventually on 31 October 2022, Javorčić was sacked after Venezia had won only two of their 12 first league matches and were near the bottom of the table. Paolo Vanoli, a former assistant coach of Antonio Conte, was hired. The team progressed and finished in the 8th place at the end of the season, while Pohjanpalo scored 19 goals in Serie B, helping Venezia to qualify to promotion play-offs, where they were knocked out by Cagliari. At the end of the next 2023–24 season, Vanoli led Venezia to finish 3rd with the captain Pohjanpalo winning the Golden Boot with 22 goals. In the promotion play-offs, Venezia defeated Palermo and Cremonese and were promoted back to Serie A after two seasons spent in Serie B.

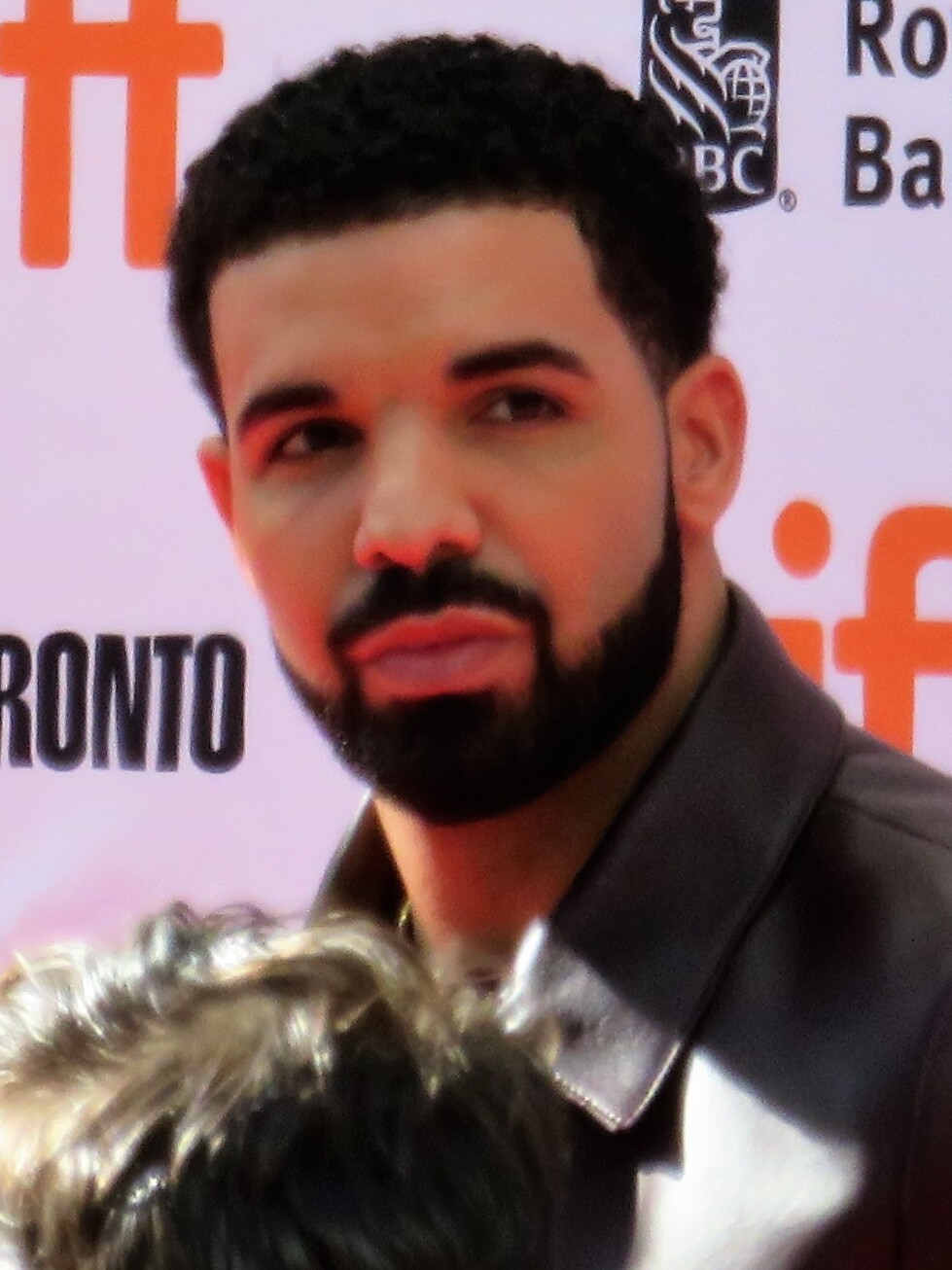
Since 2024, Canadian rapper Drake has been an investor in Venezia, joining its ownership group, while his NOCTA brand serves as the club's official technical partner.

A significant capital raise was announced for the club in July 2024. New investors included APEX Capital, Chiron Sports Group and PSALM Capital. In August 2024, Canadian musician Drake joined Venezia's ownership group as an investor. His involvement coincided with a partnership between the club and NOCTA, his Nike-associated clothing brand, which became Venezia's official technical partner for the 2024–25 season.

However, the season back in the top flight ended in relegation, with Venezia finishing in 19th place and returning to Serie B after one season in Serie A.

The 2025–26 season saw Venezia secure promotion to Serie A for the third time in five seasons, with promotion confirmed with one match remaining. On the final matchday, Venezia secured first place in the league table with a 2–0 home victory over Palermo, concluding the season as champions.

In May 2026, Venezia completed a €100 million fundraising campaign through its holding structure, VFC Newco 2023 LLC, and its Operating Committee (OpCo). As part of the investment, an investment vehicle led by sports executives Tim Leiweke, Francesca Bodie, and Keegan McDonald became the club's largest outside shareholder group. Leiweke was appointed co-chairman of the Operating Committee alongside Rob Hamwee, while Bodie succeeded Duncan Niederauer as club president. Venezia announced that Drake had facilitated the partnership by introducing Leiweke and Bodie, with whom he had previously worked at Maple Leaf Sports & Entertainment, to the club's ownership group.

== Recent seasons ==
Season	Division	Tier	Pos	Pl	W	D	L	+	-	P	Cup	Note
2016–17	Lega Pro (Group B)	III	↑ 1	38	23	11	4	59	29	80	–	Promoted to Serie B
2017–18	Serie B	II	5	42	17	16	9	56	42	67	2nd round	Eliminated in the Promotion play-offs semifinals to Palermo
2018–19	Serie B	II	15	36	8	14	14	35	46	38	2nd round	Spared from relegation after Palermo's bankruptcy, despite losing the Relegation play-out to Salernitana
2019–20	Serie B	II	11	38	12	14	12	37	40	50	3rd round	
2020–21	Serie B	II	↑ 5	38	15	14	9	53	39	59	3rd round	Promoted to Serie A after winning the Promotion play-offs
2021–22	Serie A	I	↓ 20	38	6	9	23	34	69	27	Round of 16	Relegated to Serie B
2022–23	Serie B	II	8	38	13	10	15	51	50	49	1st round	Eliminated in the Promotion play-offs quarterfinals to Cagliari
2023–24	Serie B	II	↑ 3	38	21	7	10	69	46	70	1st round	Promoted to Serie A after winning the Promotion play-offs
2024–25	Serie A	I	↓ 19	38	5	14	19	32	56	29	1st round	Relegated to Serie B
2025–26	Serie B	II	↑ 1	38	24	10	4	77	31	82	Round of 16	Promoted to Serie A

== Colours, badge and nicknames ==
Venezia's original kit

Originally Venezia's colours were blue and red and the shirt featured halves in those colours; the kit was very similar to that of Genoa. However just a year after the club was founded, it changed colours to black and green.

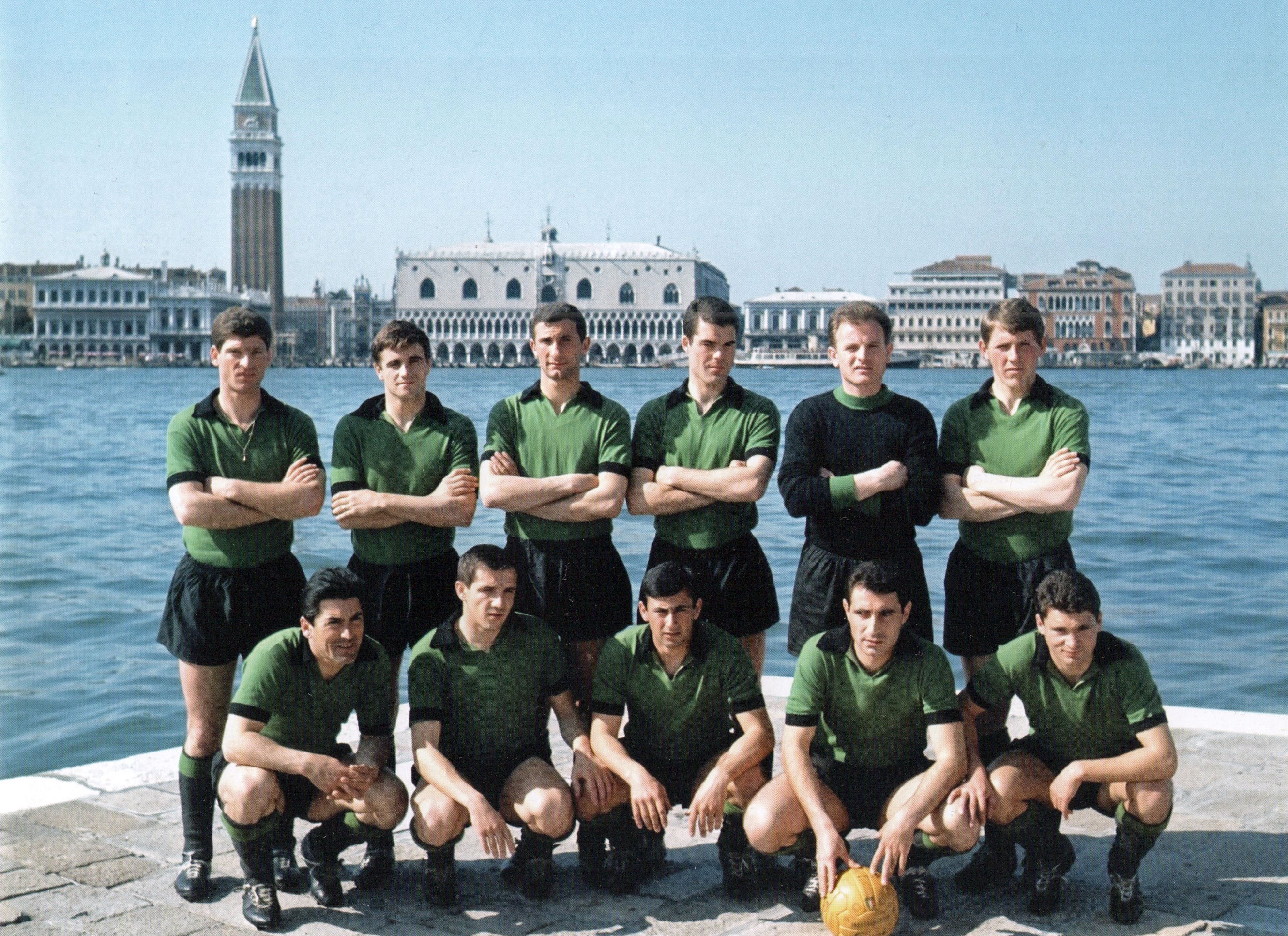
1963–64 Venezia squad with its historical black and green kit

Much later, in 1987 when the club merged with local side Associazione Calcio Mestre from Mestre who wore orange and black, orange would also become one of Venezia's official colours, giving them the nickname arancioneroverdi ("orange-black-greens"). Venezia's colours and kit are very distinctive; the shirt, shorts and socks are usually black with the shirt having a green and orange trim.

The symbol of the Venetian club is a winged-lion (see Lion of Venice), commonly mistaken for a griffin. The golden winged-lion is the official symbol carried by the city of province of Venice; the symbol has led to one of the club's most popular nicknames in the form of leoni alati ("winged-lions").

As the club has been renamed numerous times during its history, the badge has also changed several times; the most common one features the golden winged lion, along with the green and orange club colours with a golden border. As the city of Venice is situated on the Venetian Lagoon, the club is also nicknamed lagunari ("Lagoonal ones").

== Stadium ==
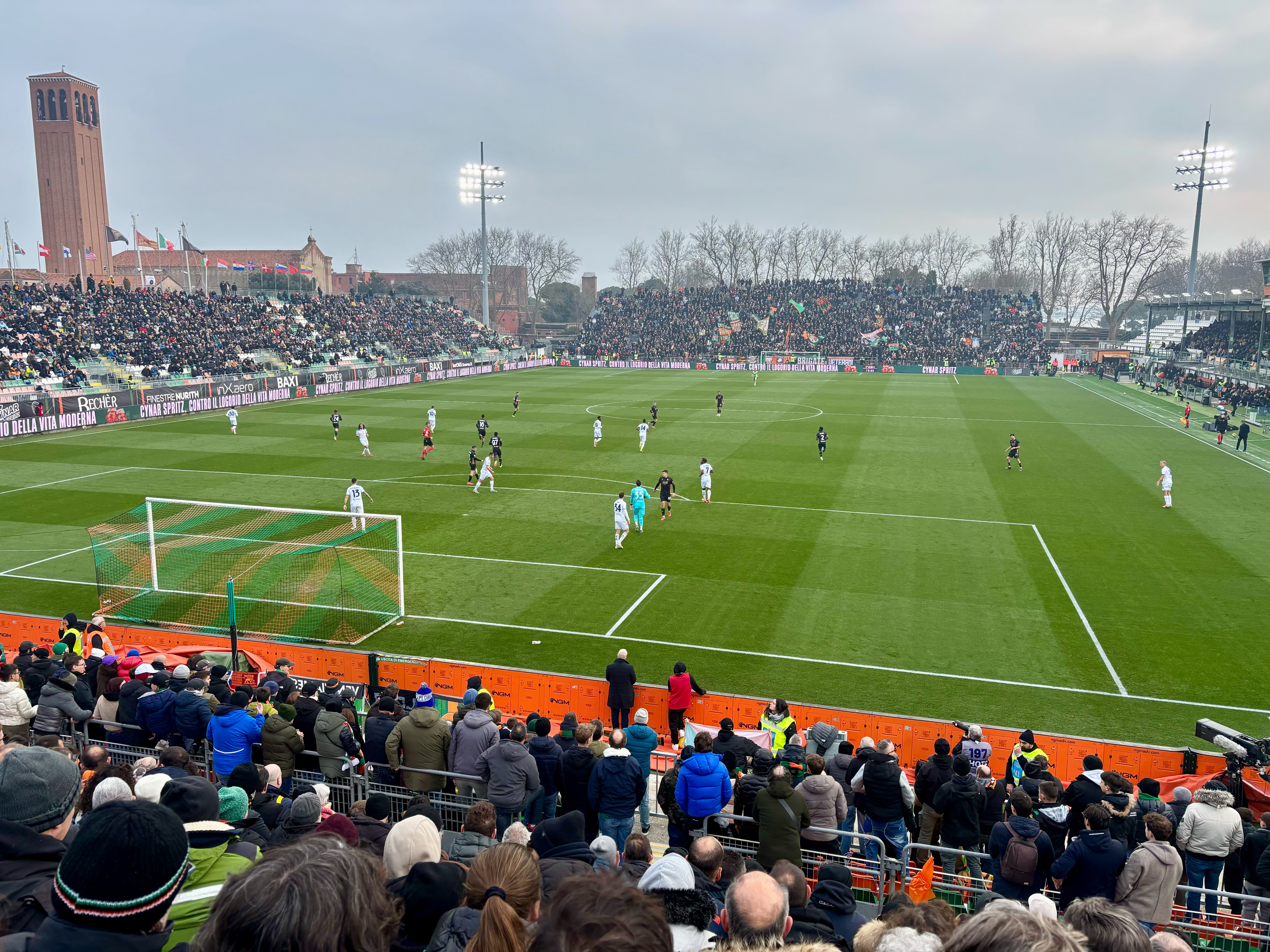
Stadio Pier Luigi Penzo

Venezia's Stadio Pier Luigi Penzo first opened in 1913 and takes its name from World War I pilot Pier Luigi Penzo. Stadio Penzo is the second-oldest stadium in Italy, after Genoa's Stadio Luigi Ferraris.

The stadium, located on the island of Sant'Elena, adjacent to the grounds of the Venice Biennale, is notable for being primarily accessible by boat.

The record attendance of 26,000 was for a 1966 Serie A match against A.C. Milan.

Originally constructed from wood, the stadium was largely upgraded with a concrete main stand in the 1920s and further improvements were made in the decades that followed.

On 11 September 1970, a tornado hit Venice and caused extensive damage to the stadium. The stadium was only partially reinstated, with the capacity reduced to just over 5,000.

When the club rose back up to Serie A in 1998, additional makeshift stands were added, bringing capacity back up to 13,400, but it has since been reduced again to the current capacity of 7,450.

== Honours ==
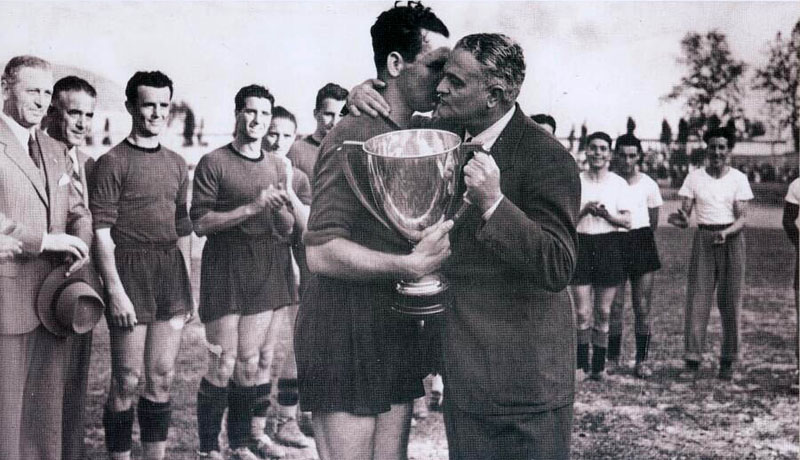
Venezia receives the 1940–41 Coppa Italia.

=== League ===
- Serie B
  - Winners: 1960–61, 1965–66, 2025–26
- Serie C/Serie C1
  - Winners: 1935–36, 1955–56, 2016–17
- Serie C2
  - Winners: 2005–06
- Serie D
  - Winners: 1982–83, 2011–12, 2015–16

=== Cups ===
- Coppa Italia
  - Winners: 1940–41
- Coppa Italia Lega Pro
  - Winners: 2016–17

== Divisional movements ==
Series	Years	Last	Promotions	Relegations
A	15	2026–27	—	▼8 (1947, 1950, 1963, 1967, 2000, 2002, 2022, 2025)
B	40	2025–26	▲9 (1939, 1949, 1961, 1966, 1998, 2001, 2021, 2024, 2026)	▼4 (1935, 1952, 1968, 2005✟)
C C2	23; 10	2016–17	▲4 (1936, 1956, 1991, 2017) ▲3 (1988 C2, 2006 C2, 2013 C2)	▼4 (1977, 1982, 2009✟, 2015✟)
88 out of 95 years of professional football in Italy since 1929
D	7	2015–16	▲4 (1979, 1983, 2012, 2016)	Never

== Player records ==
=== Most appearances ===
Competitive, professional matches only.

#	Name	Years	Matches
1	(Italy) Gianni Grossi	1960–1969	269
2	(Italy) Mario Tesconi	1954–1957, 1958–1964	255
3	(Italy) Marco Modolo	2009–2010, 2015–2024	241
4	(Italy) Giancarlo Filippini	1989–1993, 1994–1998	220
5	(Italy) Mattia Collauto	2004–2012	218
6	(Italy) Paolo Poggi	1989–1992, 2002–2003, 2004, 2006–2009	217
7	(Italy) Mario Ardizzon	1956–1963, 1971–1974	215
8	(Italy) Roberto Bellinazzi	1967–1969, 1970–1972, 1973–1974	202
9	(Italy) Francesco Pernigo	1938–1947	197
10	(Italy) Giovanni Bubacco	1957–1969	191

=== Top goalscorers ===
Competitive, professional matches only.

#	Name	Years	Goals
1	(Italy) Francesco Pernigo	1938–1947	70
2	(Italy) Filippo Maniero	1998–2002	54
3	(Italy) Roberto Bellinazzi	1967–1969, 1970–1972, 1973–1974	52
4	(Uruguay) Giovanni Alberti	1938–1947	49
5	(Finland) Joel Pohjanpalo	2022–2025	48
5	(Slovenia) Emil Zubin	2010–2012	48
7	(Italy) Paolo Poggi	1989–1992, 2002–2003, 2004, 2006–2009	44
8	(Italy) Gino Raffin	1960–1963	39
9	(Italy) Adriano Zecca	1947–1949	38
10	(Italy) Raffaele Cerbone	1993–1996	35
10	(Italy) Luigi Capuzzo	1982–1987	35

== Players ==
=== Current squad ===
As of 8 September 2026

Note: Flags indicate national team as defined under FIFA eligibility rules; some limited exceptions apply. Players may hold more than one non-FIFA nationality.

No.	Pos.	Nation	Player
1	GK	SRB	Filip Stanković
2	DF	ARG	Matías Moreno (on loan from Fiorentina)
3	DF	BEL	Joël Schingtienne
4	DF	CRO	Bartol Franjić
5	DF	SUR	Ridgeciano Haps
6	MF	USA	Gianluca Busio (captain)
7	FW	KOS	Albion Rrahmani
8	MF	ESP	Lamine Fanne
9	FW	ITA	Andrea Adorante
10	FW	ECU	John Yeboah
14	DF	POR	Thierry Correia
15	DF	BRA	Juan Jesus
16	DF	GHA	Rufai Mohammed (on loan from IF Elfsborg)
17	DF	GER	Armel Bella-Kotchap
18	DF	FRA	Antoine Hainaut
19	MF	SUI	Simon Sohm (on loan from Fiorentina)
20	DF	BEL	Richie Sagrado
21	MF	ISL	Þórir Jóhann Helgason

No.	Pos.	Nation	Player
23	GK	ITA	Matteo Grandi
25	DF	MAR	Redouane Halhal
26	MF	CRO	Toma Bašić
28	GK	ITA	Alessio Pozzi
29	FW	GER	Lion Lauberbach
30	MF	ITA	Matteo Dagasso
32	MF	GHA	Alfred Duncan
33	DF	CRO	Marin Šverko
36	MF	ITA	Lorenzo Berardi
45	FW	NGR	Akor Adams
55	MF	ITA	Simone Panada
56	MF	POL	Kornel Lisman
70	DF	ITA	Pasquale Mazzocchi (on loan from Napoli)
71	MF	ESP	Kike Pérez
77	MF	ESP	Toni Fernández (on loan from Barcelona)
95	DF	ESP	Ale Gomes
96	GK	ITA	Lorenzo Montipò

=== Other players under contract ===
As of 22 August 2026

Note: Flags indicate national team as defined under FIFA eligibility rules; some limited exceptions apply. Players may hold more than one non-FIFA nationality.

No.	Pos.	Nation	Player
—	GK	ITA	Filippo Neri

=== Out on loan ===
As of 8 September 2026

Note: Flags indicate national team as defined under FIFA eligibility rules; some limited exceptions apply. Players may hold more than one non-FIFA nationality.

No.	Pos.	Nation	Player
—	GK	ITA	Alessandro Plizzari (on loan to Südtirol until 30 June 2027)
—	DF	LUX	Seid Korać (on loan to Hellas Verona until 30 June 2027)
—	DF	SUI	Calixte Ligue (on loan to Rijeka until 30 June 2027)
—	DF	FRA	Ahmed Sidibé (on loan to Vitória de Guimarães until 30 June 2027)
—	DF	ITA	Michael Venturi (on loan to Avellino until 30 June 2027)
—	MF	ITA	Nicolò Berengo (on loan to Vis Pesaro until 30 June 2027)
—	MF	NOR	Emil Bohinen (on loan to Cesena until 30 June 2027)
—	MF	ITA	Mattia Compagnon (on loan to Hellas Verona until 30 June 2027)
—	MF	ITA	Edoardo Mariani (on loan to Vis Pesaro until 30 June 2027)

No.	Pos.	Nation	Player
—	MF	ITA	Federico Tavernaro (on loan to Vis Pesaro until 30 June 2027)
—	FW	MLT	Kevin Cannavò (on loan to Spezia until 30 June 2027)
—	FW	ESP	Antonio Casas (on loan to Sporting Gijón until 30 June 2027)
—	FW	MAR	Saad El Haddad (on loan to NK Rudeš until 30 June 2027)
—	FW	CZE	Daniel Fila (on loan to Avellino until 30 June 2027)
—	FW	ITA	Marco Ladisa (on loan to Trento until 30 June 2027)
—	FW	ITA	Alvin Okoro (on loan to Südtirol until 30 June 2027)
—	FW	ITA	Gaetano Oristanio (on loan to Torino until 30 June 2027)

== Club officials ==
=== Board of directors ===
Role	Name
Owner	(United States) VFC Newco 2023 LLC
President	(United States) Francesca Bodie
Board members	(Italy) Filippo Antonelli (Italy) Giorgio Francia (Italy) Andrea Rogg
Director of Operation	(Italy) Andrea Rogg
Finance Director and General Manager Corporate	(Italy) Giorgio Francia
Chief Revenue Officer	(Italy) Nicola Boscaro
Sales	(Italy) Maurizio Scattolin
Legal Counsel	(Italy) Erika Mazzucotelli
Matchday & Ticketing	(Italy) Marco Loconte
HR Lead	(Italy) Sara Simioni
Merchandising Lead	(Italy) Giacomo Corbetta
Sporting Director & General Manager	(Italy) Filippo Antonelli
Technical Director	(Italy) Cristian Molinaro
Director of Youth	(Italy) Roberto Colacone
Head of Football Operations	(Italy) Davide Guglielmetti
General Secretary	(Italy) Davide Brendolin
Team Manager	(Italy) Fabrizio Pasqua
Head of Scouting	(Italy) Antonio Cavallo
Youth Sector Deputy Head	(Italy) Carlo Luisi
Youth Sector Organizational Technical Coordinator	(Italy) Giorgio La Vista
Youth Sector Secretary	(Italy) Luca Lazzaro (Italy) Mara Cavallin
Youth Sector Scouting Manager	(Italy) Simone Di Battista
Youth Sector Technical Coordinator	(Italy) Gianluca Polistina
Youth Sector Head of Performance	(The Gambia) Simon Barjie
Basic Activities Coordinator	(Italy) Alberto Romano
Director of Venezia FC Femminile	(Italy) Grazia Trentin
Venezia FC Femminile Secretary	(Italy) Marco Baloci
Press officer	(Italy) Alessandro Basso
DGE	(Italy) Franco Pasqualato
SLO	(Italy) Simone Bonaldo
Maintenance	(Moldova) Cazimir Josanu

- Last updated: 4 September 2026

=== Current technical staff ===
Role	Name
Head Coach	(Italy) Davide Nicola
Assistant Coach
Strength and Conditioning Coach	(Italy) Fabio Allevi (Italy) Andrea Primitivi
Rehab Coach	(Italy) Francesco Cavedon
Technical Assistant
Goalkeeping Coach	(Italy) Nicola Dibitonto
Assistant Goalkeeping Coach	(Italy) Massimo Marini
Match Analyst	(Italy) Alessio Chiarin (Italy) Matteo Corazza
Sport & Science	(Italy) Marco Porta
Nutritionist	(Italy) Roberto Di Giacomo
Medical Area Coordinator & Player Health Director	(Italy) Andrea D’Alessandro
Healthcare Services Supervisor & Coordinator	(Greece) Efstathios Tsuroplis
Clinical Coordinator	(Italy) Francesco Lo Moro
Team Doctor	(Italy) Mattia Grassi
Physiotherapy Coordinator	(Italy) Mattia Bragato
Physiotherapist	(Italy) Gaetano Catalano (Italy) Leonardo De Grandis (Italy) Lorenzo Fogliani (Italy) Niccolò Valerio

- Last updated: 17 October 2026
