= Stadio Italia =

Building in Sorrento, Italy

- Interactive map of Stadio Italia
- Full name: Stadio Italia
- Location: Via Aniello Califano, 7 80067, Sorrento, Campania, Italy
- Coordinates: 40°37′47.249″N 14°23′1.435″E
- Owner: Comune di Sorrento
- Operator: Football Club Sorrento
- Capacity: 3,600
- Surface: Synthetic Grass
- Field size: 105 m × 60 m (344 ft × 197 ft)

Construction
- Built: 1950
- Opened: 1950
- Renovated: 2003

Tenants
- Sorrento; Sant'Agnello

Stadio Italia is a football stadium in Sorrento, Italy. The main tenants are Eccellenza Campania sides Sorrento and F.C. Sant'Agnello. It has a capacity of 3,600.

== History ==
The stadium's construction lasted less than one year, being started and completed in 1950. The stadium originally had a grass football pitch and a capacity of 3,600. In 2003, the stadium became one of the first in Italy, along with Capo d'Orlando in Sicily and Manfredonia in Apulia, to be fitted with a synthetic grass surface, due to the salinity in the air causing issues with the natural grass. The press area at the stadium has six television boxes and six newspaper/radio boxes.

== Capacity ==
Stand	Capacity
Central/West	900
North	1200
South	1500
Total	3600
