= Luigi Raffin =

Italian footballer and manager (1936–2023)

Personal information
- Date of birth: 1 June 1936
- Place of birth: Gonars, Italy
- Date of death: 2 April 2023 (aged 86)
- Place of death: Turate, Italy
- Height: 1.87 m (6 ft 1 1/2 in)
- Position: Striker

Senior career*
Years	Team	Apps	(Gls)
1954–1955	Juventus	3	(1)
1955–1956	Lecco	23	(10)
1956–1959	Biellese	93	(36)
1959–1960	Livorno	30	(12)
1960–1963	Venezia	91	(39)
1963–1964	Brescia	34	(12)
1964–1966	Palermo	27	(4)
1966–1967	Juventina Palermo	21	(6)
1967–1969	Pro Vercelli	17	(4)

Managerial career
- 1975–1976: Sorrento
- * Club domestic league appearances and goals

Luigi Raffin (1 June 1936 – 2 April 2023) was an Italian professional football player and coach.
