= Stadio Olindo Galli =

Athletics stadium in Tivoli, Italy

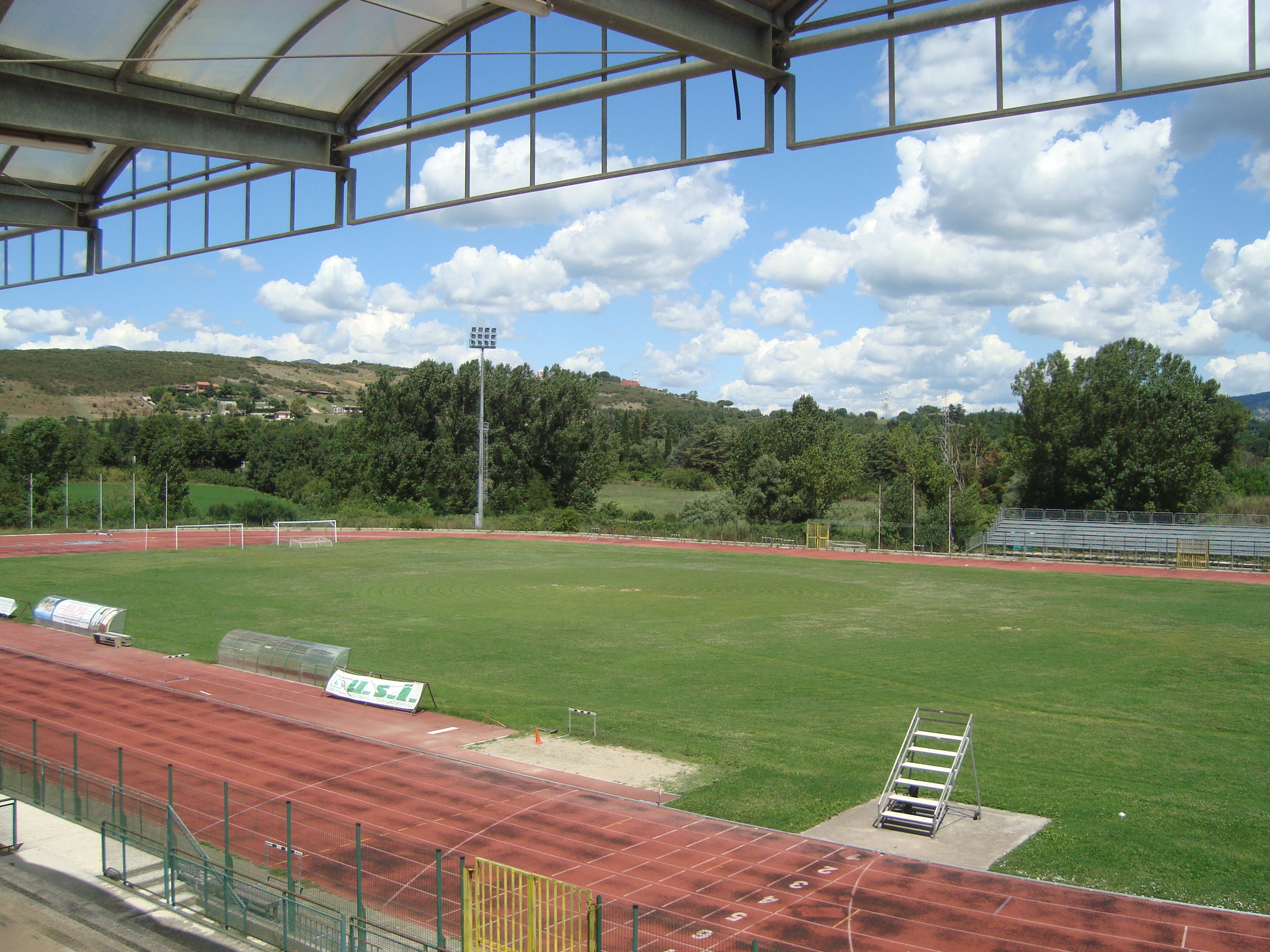
- Interactive map of Stadio Olindo Galli
- Full name: Stadio Olindo Galli
- Location: Strada Provinciale 33a, Tivoli, Metropolitan City of Rome, Italy
- Coordinates: 41°57′9.073″N 12°50′22.255″E
- Owner: Comune di Tivoli
- Operator: Lupa Roma F.C.
- Capacity: 4000
- Surface: Grass, 8-lane athletics track
- Field size: 105 m × 65 m (344 ft × 213 ft)

Construction
- Built: 1989
- Opened: 1991
- Renovated: 2016

Tenants
- Lupa Roma F.C., 2016−, Tivoli Calcio, ASD Estense Tivoli

Stadio Olindo Galli is a football and athletics stadium in Tivoli, Italy. The main tenants are Lega Pro side Lupa Roma, and Tivoli Calcio and ASD Estense Tivoli, who both play in the regional Prima Categoria division.

== History ==
Construction of the stadium began in 1989 and was completed in 1991, including a grass football pitch and 8-lane athletics track, and with a capacity of 3,500. The stadium was named after Olindo Galli, who played for Tivoli Calcio in two stints in 1920s and 1930s, and was also Tivoli coach between 1948 and 1949. In 2016, funded by Lupa Roma president Alberto Cerrai, the grass surface was completely overhauled and the stands were restructured.
