= Nicolas Di Filippo =

Italian footballer (born 1993)

Personal information
- Date of birth: 9 July 1993 (age 33)
- Place of birth: Guardiagrele, Italy
- Height: 1.86 m (6 ft 1 in)
- Position: Centre-back

Team information
- Current team: Lanciano

Youth career
- SPAL Lanciano
- 2007–2008: Siena
- 2008–2010: Virtus Lanciano

Senior career*
Years	Team	Apps	(Gls)
2010–2016	Virtus Lanciano	8	(0)
2012–2014	→ Chieti (loan)	55	(4)
2014–2015	→ Melfi (loan)	34	(0)
2016–2017	Sambenedettese	21	(0)
2017	Reggina	17	(1)
2018	Cuneo	13	(1)
2018	Prato	9	(0)
2018–2019	Cassino	24	(1)
2019	Fidelis Andria	10	(1)
2019–2022	Vastese	75	(5)
2022–2023	Pineto	39	(3)
2023–2024	Campobasso	19	(2)
2024	Ostia Mare	11	(0)
2024–2026	Chieti	24	(3)
2026–	Lanciano		
- * Club domestic league appearances and goals as of 21 December 2025

Nicolas Di Filippo (born 9 July 1993) is an Italian footballer who plays for Eccellenza club Lanciano.

== Club career ==
=== Early career ===
Born in Guardiagrele, in the Province of Chieti, Abruzzo region, Di Filippo started his career at SPAL Lanciano (originally founded as San Pietro Apostolo Lanciano), also located in the Province of Chieti. In July 2007, Di Filippo and Mattia Di Vincenzo were signed by Tuscan team Siena.

=== Virtus Lanciano ===
Circa 2008, Di Filippo returned to Lanciano for Virtus Lanciano. Di Filippo was the member of "student" (Italian: allievi) under-17 team in 2008–09 and 2009–10 season. From 2010 to 2012, Di Filippo was a member of the "Berretti" youth team.

Di Filippo also played 3 times in the Lega Pro Prima Divisione for the first team, in the 2 out of last 3 rounds in 2010–11 season, as well as the round 22 in 2011–12 season. Di Filippo also played once in 2010–11 Coppa Italia Lega Pro (Lega Pro Cup) for the first team. In the first half of the 2011–12 season, he played once in 2011–12 Coppa Italia (Italian Cup) and twice in 2011–12 Coppa Italia Lega Pro.

On 22 July 2012, Di Filippo left for the fourth division club Chieti on a temporary deal, along with Luca Verna. Di Filippo was linked to Chieti on 7 July, but still received pre-season call-up from Lanciano on 21 July.

The temporary deal was renewed on 31 August 2013. He also played for Lanciano as unused bench in 2013–14 Coppa Italia.

On 4 August 2014, he was signed by Melfi.

=== Serie C clubs ===
On 10 July 2016, Di Filippo was signed by Sambenedettese.

On 11 July 2017, Di Filippo left for Reggina on a one-year contract. On 24 January 2018, Di Filippo left for Cuneo.

=== Serie D clubs ===
In September 2018, Di Filippo joined Serie D club Prato.
