= Ciro Foggia =

Italian footballer (born 1991)

Personal information
- Date of birth: 25 March 1991 (age 35)
- Place of birth: Naples, Italy
- Height: 1.86 m (6 ft 1 in)
- Position: Forward

Team information
- Current team: Sarnese
- Number: 19

Senior career*
Years	Team	Apps	(Gls)
2008–2012	Neapolis	63	(6)
2012	Bellaria IM	7	(1)
2012–2013	Nola	16	(4)
2013–2014	Puteolana	24	(2)
2014–2015	Portici 1906	26	(16)
2015–2016	Gragnano	31	(21)
2016–2017	Melfi	34	(12)
2017–2018	Teramo	16	(3)
2018	Sicula Leonzio	17	(1)
2018–2019	Audace Cerignola	32	(12)
2019–2020	Casarano	22	(4)
2020–2021	Messina	33	(20)
2021–2022	Arezzo	17	(4)
2022–2024	Cavese	76	(30)
2024–2025	Scafatese	32	(10)
2025–2026	ASD Heraclea Calcio	17	(4)
2026–	Sarnese	15	(4)
- * Club domestic league appearances and goals as of 25 Juny 2026

Ciro Foggia (born 25 March 1991) is an Italian footballer who plays as a forward for Serie D club Sarnese.

== Club career ==
On 29 July 2021, he signed with Arezzo.

On 4 February 2022, he joined Serie D club Cavese.
