= Matteo Cortesi =

Italian football player

Personal information
- Date of birth: 21 October 1997 (age 29)
- Place of birth: Vaprio d'Adda, Italy
- Height: 1.80 m (5 ft 11 in)
- Position: Forward

Team information
- Current team: Real Calepina
- Number: 11

Youth career
- –2016: Como
- 2016: → Cagliari (loan)

Senior career*
Years	Team	Apps	(Gls)
2014–2017	Como	17	(1)
2017–2020	Brescia	9	(0)
2019–2020	→ Giana Erminio (loan)	22	(5)
2020–2021	Mantova	2	(0)
2021	Chiasso	2	(0)
2021–2022	Seregno	21	(2)
2023–2024	Real Calepina	16	(3)
2024	Vogherese	5	(0)
2025	Crema	13	(0)
2025–	Real Calepina	28	(3)
- * Club domestic league appearances and goals as of 10 November 2024

Matteo Cortesi (born 21 October 1997) is an Italian footballer who plays as a forward for Serie D club Real Calepina.

== Club career ==
He made his Serie C debut for Como on 28 August 2016 in a game against Arezzo.

On 20 July 2019, he joined Giana Erminio on loan.

On 5 October 2020, he moved to Mantova.

On 25 January 2021 he signed with Swiss club Chiasso.

On 9 August 2021, he returned to Italy and joined Serie C club Seregno. He left the club at the end of the 2021-22 season. In January 2023, Cortesi joined Real Calepina on a deal until the end of the season.
