= Asante Gullit Okyere =

Italian footballer (born 1988)

Gullit Okyere
Personal information
- Full name: Gullit Asante Okyere
- Date of birth: 23 May 1988 (age 38)
- Place of birth: Santa Maria Capua Vetere, Italy
- Height: 1.75 m (5 ft 9 in)
- Position: Striker

Team information
- Current team: Prevalle

Youth career
- ?–2007: Atalanta

Senior career*
Years	Team	Apps	(Gls)
2007–2009	Atalanta	0	(0)
2007–2008	→ Caravaggese (loan)	29	(2)
2009–2010	Caravaggese	26	(6)
2010–2012	Palazzolo	51	(33)
2012–2013	ScanzoPedrengo	34	(25)
2013–2016	Grumellese	88	(47)
2016–2018	Giana Erminio	60	(12)
2018–2019	Pergolettese	25	(11)
2019–2020	Virtus CiseranoBergamo	25	(12)
2020–2021	Real Calepina	28	(6)
2021–2022	Lumezzane	?	(15)
2022–	Prevalle		
- * Club domestic league appearances and goals as of 16:15, 11 September 2019 (UTC)

Gullit Asante Okyere (born 23 May 1988) is an Italian footballer who plays as a forward for Prevalle. He was named after Dutch footballer Ruud Gullit.

== Early life ==
Okyere was born in Santa Maria Capua Vetere, Italy as son of Ghanaian immigrants who later moved to Palazzolo sull'Oglio.

== Career ==
He began his career at Atalanta youth team In mid-2007, he joined Caravaggese of Serie C2. He returned to Atalanta in the 2008–09 season, playing with the Primavera under-19 team.

In summer 2009 he left the team for Caravaggese.

In summer 2010 he joined Eccellenza amateurs Palazzolo on a free transfer.

After two years, he joined the squad of ScanzoPedrengo, in Eccellenza; he played all the 34 games of the season scoring also 25 goals; the team finished the championship in the second position.

Later, he played with Grumellese in Eccellenza, scoring 12 goals in 25 matches in the 2013–2014 season.

In July 2016 he joins Giana Erminio team in Italian Lega Pro signing a single year contract, which was later renewed also for the following season.

He left Giana Erminio in 2018 to join Serie D club Pergolettese.

On 21 July 2019, he moved to Serie D club Virtus CiseranoBergamo.

He signed for Eccellenza amateurs Lumezzane in July 2021.

After winning promotion with Lumezzane, in July 2022 Gullit left to sign for another Eccellenza club, Prevalle.
