= History of AC Legnano =

History of Italian football club Associazione Calcio Legnano

This is the history of Associazione Calcio Legnano, commonly referred to as Legnano, an Italian football club based in Legnano, Lombardy. The club last played in Serie A in 1954 and has since played in the lower divisions of Italian football.

== The origins of soccer in Legnano (1906-1912) ==
In the early years of the 20th century, soccer began to leave the aristocratic salons and become a popular national sport. The team that dominated the fledgling Italian league at the time was Pro Vercelli, which prevailed in five seasons between 1908 and 1913. In the early days of the sport's history, teams from non-metropolitan municipalities also played an important role. In this context, the Italian national football team was founded in 1910.

In the historical framework just mentioned, the first noteworthy experiment of setting up a representative soccer team of the city of Legnano is related to a sports team that competed in 1906, on a fallow field near San Giorgio su Legnano, against Aurora of Busto Arsizio, which then won the match 2 to 1; this was thus the first "derby" between a Legnano soccer team and a Busto Arsizio team. Edgardo Palmieri, a journalist for the sports periodical Il Lilla, active in Legnano from 1923 to 1925, wrote a series of articles on pioneering Legnano soccer, an excerpt of which reads:

[...] People started playing football in 1905 and 1906. If I remember correctly, they played in the square of the Tosi schools and in Novara street on a fenced area. Later, a group was formed, a kind of club, which chose as a playing field an uncultivated meadow in the direction of San Giorgio, where a match was played against the old Aurora of Busto, whose coach was the famous Attilio Trerè, who had formed a very good team in Busto with members of the former Ausonia of Milan. [...]

— Edgardo Palmieri

The aforementioned Legnano team, which was given the name Football Club Legnano, from 1907 had a well-defined corporate organization. This first Legnano football club was born on the initiative of Serafino Triulzi and had, as its uniform, a white jersey and black shorts. This team began playing, also from 1907, on a field made available by the Wolsit company of Legnano that was located along the modern Via XX Settembre. The interest of a local company in a football team was no coincidence: the sport was in fact a way to introduce the national public to the city of Legnano and - by extension - to the factories that formed the city's economic backbone.

In 1908 this first Football Club Legnano changed its uniform from a white shirt to a white and blue one. The team participated in organized football matches with local teams and was in business until 1911 recording good sporting successes such as victories in the Seveso Cup and Brunate Cup. Edgardo Palmieri, again, described this first failed experiment thus:

[...] This beautiful project of the people of Legnano faded in 1910 and 1911. The expenses were high and the field was not good. Some players left, some for arms, others for studies abroad, and still others grew tired and left their favorite sport on the sidelines, so that the few remaining faithful, such as Venegoni, Schiatti, Oldrini, Agosti, etc., after several unsuccessful attempts to form at least a nascent team, had to give up and emigrate to nearby Gallarate, where soccer had better luck. And so the first and justified enthusiasm for the elastic ball, the football, faded away. [...]

— Edgardo Palmieri

== The foundation of Football Club Legnano and the first seasons (1913-1919) ==
The second attempt, on the other hand, had continuity and had its genesis in 1912, when G.G. Piazza of AC Milan and G.M. Riva of RFC Liege, both residents of Legnano for work purposes, began to test the ground with the intention of founding a new soccer team representative of the city of the Carroccio.

The response of the townspeople was positive, and thus, during an assembly organized in 1912 at a hall of the “Carroccio” hotel, the first board of directors formed by G.M. Riva (president), Agosti (secretary), G.G. Piazza, Bonacina, Venegoni, Schiatti, Ruggeri, Lamberti, Vigo and Lorenzini (directors) approved the statute of incorporation of the Legnan Football Club, decreeing at the same time that the social colors would be red and black. The choice fell on these two colors perhaps to recall the uniform of Milan, which had recently been founded in the Lombard capital. The new club also used, for official matches and training, the aforementioned playing field provided by Wolsit. Later the management set out to find a proper playing field: the field, equipped and fenced, was then built in Via Lodi at the expense of the Legnanese metalworking company Franco Tosi and the industrialist Antonio Bernocchi. In this way the new playing field, due to the fencing, could allow paid admission of the public and the consequent financial income due to ticket sales.

The first actual president of the new club, however, was Aldo Visconti, who replaced G.M. Riva almost immediately, while Eugenio Tosi was elected as honorary president, with Engineer Bombaglio being voted vice-president. On the occasion of this change at the top of the club, the Legnano that still exists today was officially founded: in fact, during the first board meeting the new name of the club, Football Club Legnano, which recalled the name of the 1906 club, was decreed, as well as the new corporate color, lilac, which was never changed again.

Part of the directors of the newly formed club came from the team set up by Serafino Triulzi in 1906. However, the foundation date of the club that is still active today is not known, as there is no trace of it in the archival documents: therefore, January 1, 1913 is a symbolic foundation date: the date of the establishment of the club can be traced between January and August 1913, as the first official season played by Legnano was the 1913-1914 championship. (Note: Cf. www.statistichelilla.it/home.htm.)

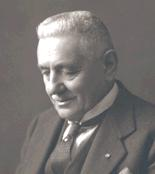
Antonio Bernocchi

In light of the promising results achieved in the first matches, Antonio Bernocchi began to generously finance the newly formed club, laying the foundation for future participation in the top leagues of Italian soccer. The team enrolled in the 1913-1914 Third Category championship, the third level of the Italian soccer pyramid at the time, finishing 7th and penultimate in the Lombardy Regional Committee's group A, and being eliminated from the Saronno Cup and the Victoria Tournament. The team's performance was judged, by the lilac management, not up to expectations; at the end of the season it was therefore decided to reinforce the roster with the purchase of new players.

In the 1914-1915 season, being equipped with a fenced and homologated field larger than 90x45 m, the Lilla entered the Lombard Promozione, the second level of Italian soccer in those years. They competed in group A, where they finished sixth and last, a result that fell short of expectations also due to the team's withdrawal from the championship with three days to go. Legnano's withdrawal was caused by the departure of three players to the front (World War I had in fact broken out) and the injury of lilla captain Oldrini, who broke his leg during a match. Due to the team's voluntary withdrawal, the last three days were ruled forfeited. These negative results led to a deep corporate crisis; on this occasion, Legnano came close to dissolution, which was avoided with the reorganization of management.

In 1915 all official activity ceased due to the outbreak of war. Players not engaged at the front continued to practice sports activities and the lilac club took part in friendly matches and some tournaments run by teams affiliated with the F.I.G.C. There were several successes in the various local football events, which allowed Legnano to compete against the likes of Milan, Inter, Unione Sportiva Milanese and Torino.

Following the brilliant results achieved in friendly matches before the start of the season, and as a result of the purchase of some promising players, the club decided to have the team participate in second-tier tournaments organized by clubs affiliated with the F.I.G.C. In particular, in the 1915-1916 season, Legnano achieved a prestigious 2nd place at the Coppa Internazionale behind Saronno, won the Lombardy Cup and won the Vannucci Cup. The Lombardy Cup was the first important trophy won by the Lilla.

At the beginning of the 1916-1917 season, Antonio Bernocchi became president of Legnano. In this championship the team successfully participated in tournaments organized by clubs affiliated with the F.I.G.C., also thanks to the arrival of promising players, finishing 2nd in the Lombardy Cup, the Boneschi Cup and the Val d'Olona Cup and winning the Bernocchi Ball Trophy over Spezia. With the three wins over Inter and the success over Milan in the Lombardy Cup, interest around the Lilla began to grow. Compared to the first seasons, the quality of play had also significantly improved.

In the 1917-1918 season, Legnano finished 3rd in the Mauro Cup and won the Saronno Cup. Noteworthy was an event that happened during the Mauro Cup. On the second day, Legnano was defeated at home by Milan 3-2, but a 2-0 forfeit was decreed in favor of the Rossoneri due to some incidents that broke out on and off the playing field. On the occasion, the field in Via Lodi was subjected to a suspension, which was the first one suffered by a Legnano playing field.

In the 1918-1919 season, the most important result achieved by the Lilla was the victory in the Mauro Cup, which allowed Legnano to enter, in the following season, the First Category, the highest level of the Italian football pyramid at the time, since the trophy dedicated to Francesco Mauro was considered a first-tier tournament. As a result of this victory, the Lilla's notoriety grew significantly. On the sidelines of the Mauro Cup a noteworthy episode happened: in the aftermath of Legnano's victory over Inter, the Gazzetta dello Sport assigned - in its columns - the success to the Nerazzurri. Lilla fans vehemently protested and gathered in a sit-in in Piazza Monumento, where they burned some copies of the newspaper under the monument to the Warrior of Legnano. The next day the newspaper apologized, rectifying the error. In the same season Legnano finished 2nd in the Giuriati Cup and the Targa Burba, and 4th in the Biffi Cup.

== In the top division (1919-1926) ==
With the end of World War I, the federal championships organized by the F.I.G.C. restarted. The Lilla played their first official season in the First Category 1919-1920 by being placed in the Lombardy Group C where they finished second in the five-team tournament behind Milanese. They then played in Group A of the national semifinals with big name teams such as Alessandria, Milan, Genoa, Pro Vercelli and Venezia, finishing fifth and failing to qualify for the national finals. Noteworthy was the victory, on the third day of Group A of the national semifinals, over multi-time champion Pro Vercelli by 2-1. Another important event was the call-up of lilla goalkeeper Angelo Cameroni to the national team; Cameroni played only one match on the national team, the friendly Italy-France on January 18, 1920, which ended 9-4 for the Azzurri.

Legnano, in the 1920-1921 season, won the Group D of the Regional Qualifying Tournament of the Northern League, being promoted to the final regional round, which they won ahead of Inter and AC Milan, becoming Lombardy's I Category champions. In this final round, noteworthy were the two victories against AC Milan. The creation of an additional group stage, the final regional one, was prompted by the increase in the number of affiliated teams, which testified to the growing popularity of soccer. Legnano then qualified for the semifinals, where it was placed in Group C along with Torino, Padova and Mantova. They fought to the last moment against Torino for the first place in the group, which was valid for qualification to the finals of the Northern Italy championship, and after the victory in the direct clash on the last day, Legnano even seemed to be able to get the better of Torino, being at the top of the standings tied with Torino, but with a match to make up against Mantova, who were at the bottom of the table. An unexpected defeat in Mantua in the match prevented the Lilla from overtaking, prompting the need for a play-off between the two teams: the match was played at the neutral venue of Vercelli and was suspended on the result of 1-1 during the "overtime", after a full 158 minutes of play, then the referee decreed the end of the match due to the exhaustion of the two teams and the onset of nightfall. Playoffs at that time did not end after extra time and possible penalty kicks, but continued to the bitter end until the first and decisive goal of either team (now known as sudden death or golden goal). The repetition of the play-off between Legnano and Torino was to be played the following week, but the two teams, extremely exhausted, decided to forgo the finals by withdrawing from the championship due to exhaustion of strength with only three games to go before the final that awarded the title of Italian champion.

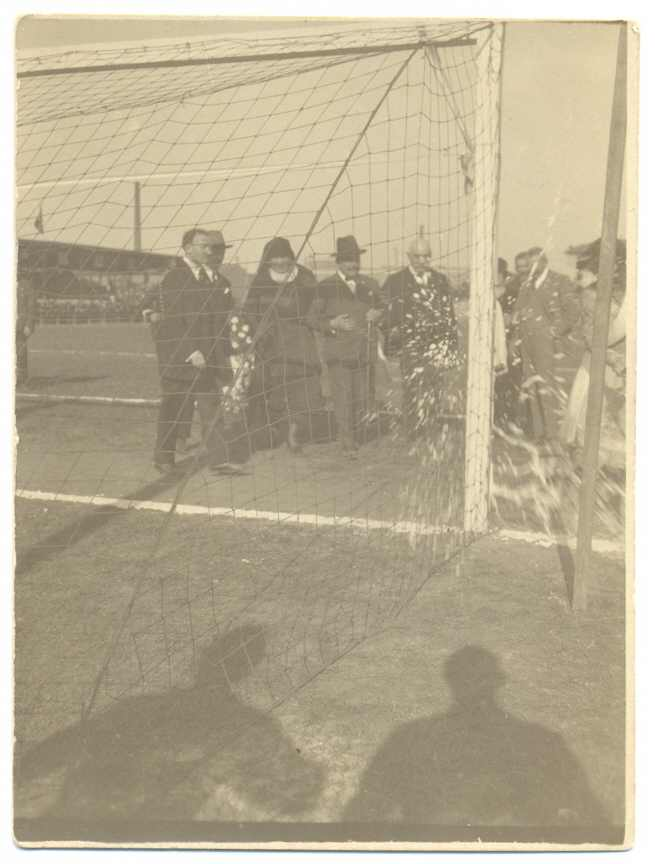
October 2, 1921: inauguration of the stadium in Via Pisacane. The ceremony ended with a football match between Legnano and Inter, a match that was valid for the 1921-1922 First Division championship and that ended with the result of 6-0 for the Legnanese.

In protest of the size reached by the league (64 registered in the North) and the rejection of the Pozzo Project, a plan to reform the leagues aimed at reducing the participants in the top league for northern Italy to only 24, Legnano, along with 23 other major clubs, was among the secessionist teams that joined the C.C.I. by founding a league parallel to the federal one.

In July 1921 it welcomed by merger the club Giovani Calciatori Legnanesi. In the 1920-1921 season, G.C. Legnanesi also played in the First Category, and thus the city of Legnano was represented, at the highest level, by two football clubs. However, being placed in two different groups, the two clubs never played a derby.

Thus, in the 1921-1922 season there were two Italian soccer championships, one organized by the F.I.G.C. and one arranged by the C.C.I.; Legnano participated in the second mentioned tournament. The Lilla ended the Group B of the First Division of the C.C.I. in sixth position, without advancing to the next round, with 20 points on a par with Casale and Torino and 17 points behind the leading Genoa. On October 21, 1921, the city stadium in Via Pisacane was inaugurated, which from then on became the Lilla's home playing field. Built on land ceded by the Legnano mechanical company Franco Tosi near its factories and workers' houses, it was inaugurated on the first day of the championship, which saw Legnano's victory over Inter by 6-0.

At the end of the season, the rift between the F.I.G.C. and the C.C.I. was mended. Upon the reunification of the two federations, the league was reformed, collecting the complaints of the "rebel" teams. In the 1922-1923 season, Legnano achieved an excellent second place with 32 points in Group B of the Northern League First Division, behind Genoa, the leader with 39 points who eventually became Italian champions. However, the round was passed only by the first-place finisher in the group. Noteworthy were the victories against Juventus on the seventh day and against Bologna on the thirteenth round.

The 1923-24 season marked the beginning of a coaching change: the duo formed by Primo Colombo and Adamo Bonacina was replaced by the Hungarian Imre Schöffer, who was Legnano's first professional coach and the first of foreign nationality. The Lilla, in the 1923-1924 season, competed in Group B of the Northern League First Division, finishing sixth with 21 points, 10 points behind group winner Bologna. Noteworthy were the victories against Torino on the eighth day and against Pro Vercelli on the tenth round.

Subsequent championships were not as successful: in 1924-1925, Legnano came close to relegation with an eleventh and penultimate place in the First Division's Lega Nord Group A with 15 points, 15 points behind Genoa, the leaders, and three points behind Spezia, at the bottom of the table. The Lilla avoided the relegation playoffs with the second-place finishers of the Second Division due to the latter's withdrawal. In the aforementioned season, the first foreign players, Hungarians Rokken and Zsin, also arrived at Legnano. In this championship, noteworthy were the two victories over Torino and the success, in Milan, over Inter with a brace by Rokken in front of 500 lilla fans. At the end of the championship, due to the poor results obtained and the financial situation, which was problematic, the top management was reset with the hope of avoiding bankruptcy. In fact, an extraordinary commission was elected with the task of solving the budget problems. Carlo Delle Piane, a descendant of one of the founders of Manifattura di Legnano, was elected to the presidency of Legnano. This championship was unfortunate especially for another reason: on February 27, Legnano footballer Imre Rokken died of sepsis. The last farewell to the young champion was given by a huge crowd.

The descent into the lower league was postponed only for a year, as a result of the planned reduction of participants in the top league tournament to only 16 clubs as of 1926-1927, and the consequent introduction of four relegations per group, Legnano in the 1925-1926 First Division championship with the 12th and last place in the Group A of the First Northern Division, was relegated to the First Division, that is, to the category downgraded to the second level by the Charter of Viareggio and namesake of the old top league. Legnano thus experienced the first relegation in its history. The bad season was also the result of the sale of the best players before the start of the championship, which was caused by the need to restore the club's finances: in fact, the primary goal was to avert the club's bankruptcy.

However, the Charter of Viareggio, a project to reform the leagues, gave Legnano and the other relegated teams some hope of salvation by instituting a qualifying knockout tournament (with quarterfinals, semifinals and finals) with a place for the top division (renamed the National Division) up for grabs. Legnano, however, was unable to take advantage of the opportunity granted to it: winning the quarterfinal against Udinese by forfeit due to the opponent's withdrawal, it was eliminated in the semifinals by Alessandria with a resounding score of 4-1, thus relegating to the First Division, that is, the new second tier (namesake of the old top series) that was established following the creation of the National Division.

== The return to the National Division and the debut in Serie A (1926-1930) ==
In the 1926-1927 season, the first for Legnano in the First Division (now the name of the second tier), the team finished third in Group B with 23 points, behind Novara (first with 30 points) and Biellese (second with 24 points), coming close to promotion. Legnano then failed to be promoted to the National Division (the top league at the time), the new name for the highest level of Italian soccer, a goal that was instead achieved for the first time by rivals Pro Patria: in this way, Legnano lost its role as the sole football reference point of the Alto Milanese. In this season Legnano participated for the first time in the 1926-1927 Italian Cup. In this competition it was eliminated in the second round by Bologna. This season of the national cup was peculiar: it was suspended - and never resumed - in the round of 16 because there were no free dates to play the matches.

In 1927-1928, Legnano, ranked 2nd in Group B of the First Northern Division, was automatically promoted back to the National Division, due to its enlargement to 32 teams and the disappearance of Unione Sportiva Milanese, which had in the meantime merged with Inter to form Ambrosiana:

A total of 32 teams will compete in the National Division Championship next season, playing in two groups of 16 teams each. Registration will close on the following July 10th. On the basis of the entries received, the Federal Directorate will draw up the groups and determine the various teams to be promoted. However, we can inform you that eight more teams than expected will participate in the National Division, based on both political and sporting criteria. In addition to the 24 teams already qualified, the following teams will be promoted to the highest category: Hellas, Reggiana, Triestina (regardless of the latter's position in the standings, but in homage to the other titles of the noble Trieste), Fiorentina, Legnano, Milanese, Venezia and Prato, taking into account that the Tuscan city has as many as 155 registered players.

— Resolution of the FIGC, reported by "La Stampa" of June 29, 1928, p. 5.

The two groups of sixteen teams thus established would thus have had a twofold purpose: both to award the 1929 title - which for obvious reasons of timing, at that point would not have been played with a final tournament, but rather by reintroducing the final for one last time (and for the same reason the CONI Cup was also not played) - and to divide the clubs into an elite grouping and a cadet grouping for the seasons to come. Specifically, half of the clubs would form the National Division Serie A, while those ranked between ninth and fourteenth would give rise to the National Division Serie B along with the four winners of the First Division (now downgraded to the third tier), with the last two ranked in each group being relegated to the last mentioned category.

Legnano played a very bad championship, ending the 1928-1929 National Division in 16th and last place in the Group A of the National Division and relegating to the First Division, from that year downgraded, as already mentioned, to the third level of Italian soccer. However, in the summer, the FIGC expanded the Serie A and B tournaments of the National Division to 18 clubs leading to the repechage of the 4 relegated from the First Division, including Legnano, which were readmitted to Serie B. The 1928-1929 season also saw the birth of a rivalry with Pro Patria, a team from neighboring Busto Arsizio: in fact, the first official direct clash between the two teams took place on October 28, 1928.

The Lilla then disputed the 1929-1930 season in Serie B, that is, in the first edition of the second tier organized in a single group. The season ended with the Lilla in second place with 46 points, three points behind leading Casale. Legnano was then promoted to Serie A. This promotion was unexpected: the management, in fact, was not aiming at the top division because of the ever-increasing costs that were necessary to aspire to the highest level of Italian soccer.

== The temporary decline (1930-1945) ==
In the 1930-1931 season, the management decided on the almost total maintenance of the previous season's roster without therefore attempting to strengthen the team to better perform in Serie A. After debuting on the first day with an encouraging home victory over Genoa in a stadium packed with fans, Legnano played a decidedly disappointing season, which ended with last place in the standings with 19 points and consequent relegation to Serie B. Legnano finished one point behind Livorno, which was relegated along with Lilla, and two points behind Casale, which was saved instead. Noteworthy were the 6-2 victory against Modena on the 28th day and the success against Napoli on the last day of the championship.

Four seasons in Serie B followed, with mid-table placings. For the 1931-1932 season, the management's goal was to set up a team suitable to play a good Serie B championship without aspiring to promotion to the top division. This season ended with the 11th place in the standings with 34 points, 9 points behind Udinese, the first of the relegated teams, and 16 points behind the leader Palermo.

In the 1932-1933 season, Legnano's financial situation continued to be precarious, so much so that the Lilla's registration in the league was at risk. The latter was accomplished thanks to the injection of money into the company coffers by some managers and the sale of some players. Thus, salvation had become the objective. This season ended with 12th place in the standings with 26 points, tied with Cremonese, and 25 points behind the leader Livorno, as well as 5 points behind Pistoiese, last in the standings. In this season there were no relegations due to the reform of the league: from the following season it would become a two-group league, resulting in an increase in the number of participating teams.

The 1933-1934 Serie B season, which was organized with two groups in order to contain the costs of travel, ended for Legnano with 11th place in the standings of Group A with 16 points, two places behind Cagliari, the penultimate and first of the relegated teams, and 20 points behind the leader Sampierdarenese. The other relegated team was Derthona, which stopped at 9 points. Legnano made a mediocre championship and was saved on the last day despite two defeats in the last two games of the tournament. Before the start of the championship, the new management, in order to boost the company's coffers, decided to sell some of its best players.

In 1934, Giulio Riva, a businessman active in textiles, became president of Legnano and remained in office until 1945. The 1934-1935 Serie B season underwent another change, which was finalized for the following season's championship: the latter would in fact return to a single group format, resulting in a sharp decrease in the number of participating teams. For this reason, two 16-team groups were prepared, half of which would be relegated to Serie C. Considering the results of previous years, and the impossibility of assembling a better team, Legnano was very much expected to get relegated. Legnano played a mediocre championship, despite some notable victories that were achieved against Pro Patria, Messina and Pisa, which partially soothed the suffering of the lilla fans; the home record was decent, compared to a disastrous away performance. The season ended with 13th place in the league standings in Group A with 21 points, 11 points behind Messina, i.e., the team that occupied the last place available for salvation, and 21 points behind the leader Genoa 1893. Legnano thus experienced its first relegation to Serie C in its history.

The monogram of Football Club Legnano, used until the 1934-1935 season, after which the club changed its name to Associazione Calcio Legnano

Two bad seasons in Serie C followed, with the team relegated twice to the regional First Division and as many times re-promoted to Serie C by the federation. In the 1935-1936 Serie C season, the Lilla were placed in the Group B; Legnano had a very bad championship, finishing in 12th place with 21 points, 24 points behind the leading Cremonese and tied with Fanfulla, which made the relegation playoff necessary. The two teams faced each other on the neutral field of Brescia on May 31, 1936 with the final result of 3-1 for Fanfulla, which decreed the second consecutive relegation for the Lilla, this time to the regional First Division. Legnano was then re-promoted in the summer of 1936 by the F.I.G.C. due to the enlargement of the number of teams participating in Serie C the following season. In the 1935-1936 Coppa Italia, Legnano was eliminated in the third round by Pro Vercelli. In the first round the Lilla beat Lecco, while in the second round they beat Falck. The latter match was marred by a tragic episode: in the 55th minute a Falck player collapsed to the ground struck down by an illness. The match was suspended on the result of 2-0 for the Lilla and later awarded on a forfeit basis to Legnano with the same result due to Falck's decision not to continue the match.

In the 1936-1937 season in Group B, Legnano finished fourth-last along with Crema with 26 points, 16 points behind the leading Vigevano and 12 points behind the bottom-placed Gallaratese. It would still have been relegated, but thanks to a new expansion of the Serie C table, for the second time in two years, the team was re-promoted to Serie C. In July 1936 the club changed its name, abandoning the English name Football Club Legnano for the more Italic Associazione Calcio Legnano: the Italianization of the club's name was imposed by the fascist regime. In the 1936-1937 Coppa Italia it was eliminated in the first round by Vigevano.

The performance in the 1937-38 season was better than in the previous championships, especially at home, with Legnano finishing 6th in the Group B standings with 34 points paired with Lecco, 6 points behind the two leaders Fanfulla and Piacenza and 12 points behind Isotta Fraschini, that is, the first among the relegated. In the 1937-1938 Coppa Italia, Legnano was eliminated in the first round by SIAI Marchetti of Sesto Calende.

In the 1938-39 season, Legnano played its fourth consecutive championship in Serie C, again obtaining 6th place in the standings, this time in Group C with 26 points, 12 points behind the leading Brescia and 5 points behind Crema, the third-last in the standings and first among the relegated. In the 1938-1939 Coppa Italia, on the other hand, it was eliminated in the first round by Biellese after overcoming Dopolavoro Fiat in the qualifiers through a double clash that was necessary because of the draw that resulted, even after extra time, in the first match.

In Group C of the 1939-1940 Serie C season, Legnano, with 31 points, again achieved 6th place in the standings thanks to a good championship, especially at home. In the standings, the Lilla were ranked 9 points behind the leader Varese and 13 points behind Gerli Cusano, third-last in the standings and first among the relegated. In the 1939-1940 Coppa Italia, Legnano was eliminated in the second round by Monza after going through the qualifiers by beating Pro Patria 3 to 2 and overcoming the first round by defeating Omegna.

In the 1940-41 Serie C season, Legnano achieved 9th place in the standings of Group C with 29 points, 23 points away from Pro Patria promoted to Serie B and 14 points from Omegna, last in the standings and the only one relegated. In the 1940-1941 Coppa Italia, however, Legnano was eliminated in the qualifiers by Meda.

In the 1941-1942 season Legnano played a mediocre championship in the Group C of the Serie C, placing 10th with 25 points, 26 points behind the leader Varese and 13 points behind the penultimate Meda and first among the relegated. The Lilla's championship was characterized by a good start, which was followed by a series of bad matches; the tournament then ended with a decent finish, which allowed the team to save itself quite easily.

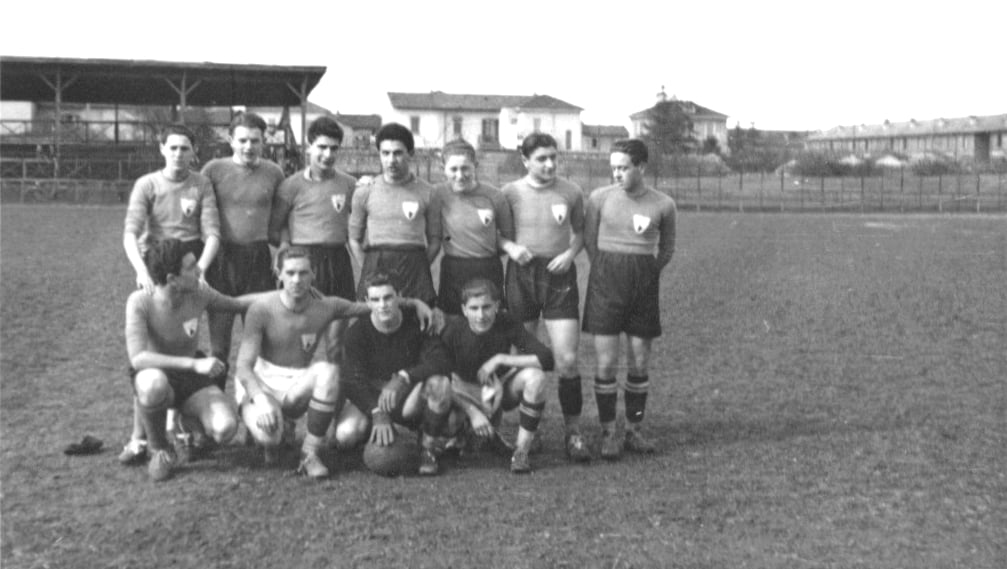
A line-up of A.C. Legnano in 1942

Although the restrictions of the war were becoming increasingly felt, even for the 1942-1943 season the Football Federation decided not to interrupt the championships. The vicissitudes of the war also began to have repercussions in soccer, with many clubs in clear difficulty and unable, in the end, to register for championships. Serie C also was affected by this situation: there were only 13 teams participating in Group D, the one in which Legnano took part. Despite the revamped squad, Legnano played an excellent championship, placing 3rd in the Group D with 34 points, one less than the second-placed Vigevano and six less than the leading Varese, which would later win the finals, obtaining promotion to Serie B. Considering the last eight seasons, this was the Lilla's best result in the league.

The ominous events of World War II culminated with the arrest of Benito Mussolini and the tragic denouement of the armistice on September 8, 1943, as a result of which Italy was divided in two and was plunged into civil war. As for soccer, the championships were discontinued and the headquarters of the F.I.G.C. were moved to Milan. The Federation, in the 1943-1944 season, organized some wartime tournaments in which Legnano took part.

In 1943-1944, Legnano were included in Group D of the Serie C Alta Italia, a mixed II Zone tournament that was arranged by the II Zone Directorate (Lombardy). (Note: Organized by the Directorate II Zone (Lombardy), which arranged the tournament by also including teams belonging to the regional Series C, First and Second Divisions plus some teams from the Sezione Propaganda, whose tournaments could not be reorganized.) Legnano won, with 22 points, the eight-team group (in which Legnanese clubs participated) and then won with 13 points the final six-team group, in which other Lombardy teams took part. However, the final round was interrupted with one day to go for contingent reasons, given the repeated daytime air raid alerts. During this season Legnano played the first and only derby of the city of the Carroccio organized in a FIGC championship: in the Serie C Alta Italia tournament, the Lilla met Robur Legnano in a two-legged match, which they won 3-1 at home and 2-1 away.

In December 1944, under the auspices of the C.O.N.I. of the Italian Social Republic, the Torneo Benefico Lombardo was organized, in which twelve clubs, including the Lilla, participated. Legnano was able to field Del Bianco from Livorno, Monza from Lazio, Lamanna from Atalanta, Rancilio from Triestina, Mariani from Novara and Demaria from Ambrosiana, all players obtained on loan from their respective teams since transfers were blocked at the end of the 1942-1943 season. The final standings saw the Lilla in sixth place with 18 points, tied with Milan and Pro Patria, and 14 points behind leading Como. Gallaratese and Varese renounced their participation in the tournament at the end of the first round; despite the withdrawal, the results achieved by the two teams up to the renouncement were counted for the purposes of the ranking.

== The early post-World War II years: between Serie A and B (1945-1957) ==
After the Liberation, with World War II over, the F.I.G.C. decided to restore the championships taking into account the tournaments played by the teams during the 1942-1943 season, that is, the last official season organized by the Federation. Given the still difficult situation, the Federation arranged provisional championships: in the North a Serie A tournament and a mixed Serie B and C tournament (in which Legnano also took part), and in the South a mixed Serie A and B championship. The Federation also organized a Serie C tournament divided into two leagues, one in the North and one in the South-Central. With the resumption of official activities, Legnano had a new president, Pino Mocchetti, a textile and pharmaceutical entrepreneur, who immediately had the goal of bringing the Lilla back to Serie A. The mixed Serie B and C tournament included a final round to which the top two finishers in each group would be admitted; the winner of the final tournament would then be promoted to the top division. The Lilla, who were placed in the Group B of the Serie B-C North as a third-tier club, finished in 4th place with 26 points, 2 points behind Pro Patria, 7 points behind top-ranked Cremonese (both qualified for the final round) and 13 points behind bottom-ranked Trento. When the season was over, the Lilla were ex officio admitted to Serie B due to the decision to organize the second-tier tournament - still for two seasons - with several groups so as to limit the cost of travel and then return, later, to the single group; in this way, the number of teams admitted to Serie B grew considerably, and Legnano also benefited from this. In contrast, as far as the Coppa Alta Italia was concerned, Legnano finished fifth and last in the Group D.

For the 1946-47 season, the goal of promotion to Serie A was reiterated: the buying campaign was therefore aimed at further strengthening the roster. Of all, the most important purchase was that of Bruno Mozzambani, who in six seasons at Legnano scored 77 goals (a record still unbeaten) with a scoring average of 0.44 goals per game; with these numbers, Mozzambani became one of the lilla flagship players. The championship played was excellent: among the 22 participants in the Group A, Legnano finished in 2nd place with 53 points, seven less than the promoted Pro Patria, undisputed leaders, and five more than the third-place Novara, almost achieving promotion to Serie A.

The 1947-1948 Serie B season was the last to be organized with multiple groups: from the following championship it would in fact return to a one-group system, resulting in a sharp reduction in the number of participating teams. To be precise, the winners of the three groups would be promoted to Serie A, those that came from second to sixth place would obtain salvation, while the teams that finished seventh would participate in a salvation tournament during which relegation would be decided: all other teams would instead be relegated to Serie C. Legnano's goal, also for this season, was promotion to Serie A. For this reason, the roster was further strengthened. After an excellent start, Legnano experienced an up-and-down performance that made them bid farewell to their promotion dreams already at the end of the first round. The final result was the 4th place in the league table in Group A with 40 points tied with Seregno and Spezia, 6 points behind the leading Novara and one point behind the two seventh-place finishers, Pro Sesto and Crema, who participated in the salvation group.

Still with the goal of promotion to Serie A, for the 1948-1949 season, a buying campaign was prepared aimed at further improving the squad. In the league, a fluctuating performance did not allow Legnano to go beyond 8th place in the standings, which thus played a transitional season. The Lilla finished tied with Pisa on 42 points, 18 points behind leading Como and 5 points ahead of Parma, first among the relegated.

In the 1949-1950 season, a very positive start, which temporarily brought Legnano to the top of the standings, was followed by a long series of fluctuating results, especially away from home, from which they achieved the final 3rd place in the standings with 57 points, 4 points behind Napoli in the lead and 3 points behind Udinese in second place. Overall, in the championship Legnano did not disappoint expectations and made a positive impression, raising hopes for the future and for a possible and imminent promotion to Serie A.

Legnano played an excellent 1950-1951 Serie B championship, which ended with the Lilla's promotion to Serie A due to their 2nd place in the standings with 54 points, four less than the leading SPAL and seven more than Modena who came third. The mathematical certainty of promotion was obtained on the third-last day despite the defeat to Catania: the change of category was celebrated on the following day, which Legnano played at home, by the fans' pitch invasion at the end of the match, the municipal band and the delivery of gold medals to the Lilla players by the F.I.G.C. president. After the match it was the whole town that celebrated, with two lilla players, Lorenzo Colpo and Bruno Mozzambani, going around the town center greeted by an enthusiastic public. This season was among the best ever played by Legnano: during the championship the Lilla set many records, which still stand unbeaten after decades. Among them, there are the most consecutive wins (9 from the 15th to the 23rd day), the most victories (25), the most home wins (19 out of 20), the most consecutive home wins (15), the most goals scored (89), the most goals scored by a player in a single match (Bertoni, five in Legnano-Treviso 8-2), the victory by the widest margin (against Seregno 7-0) and the victory with the most goals scored (against Treviso 8-2).

The 1951-1952 season marked Lilla's return to the top level of Italian soccer after a 21-year absence. This season ended with the 20th and last place in the standings with 17 points (12 points less than the penultimate Padova), which led to the Lilla's relegation to Serie B. Noteworthy was an incident that occurred on the first day of the return leg, February 3, 1952, involving Bruno Tassini, referee of Legnano-Bologna, won by the Rossoblu with a penalty a few minutes from the end; the referee, who was challenged for two penalties denied to Legnano and, more generally, for the refereeing deemed in favor of the guests, was attacked by some Lilla fans at the Milano Centrale railway station on his way home to Verona. The Lilla suffered a heavy disqualification of the pitch (11 months: it was the longest disqualification imposed, until then, on a Serie A stadium) and a 2-0 forfeit for the throwing, during the match, of snowballs from the stands.

Due to relegation to Serie B after a disastrous championship finished in last place, and the long field disqualification imposed for the assault on referee Tassini, later lifted for relegation to Serie B, Pino Mocchetti left the position of president. He was replaced by an extraordinary commissioner, Luigi Mandelli, who was in turn replaced by Giovanni Mari. Mari became president at only 32 years old, an age that allowed him to set a record: until then, no Italian professional sports club had ever had such a young president. Legnano's goal this season was an immediate return to Serie A. The 1952-1953 season then ended with 2nd place in the standings with 41 points tied with Catania and three points behind leading Genoa. This championship was characterized by a hard-fought head-to-head battle between the three teams, where Legnano's 4-0 home win over Genoa on the 11th day stood out. The Sicilians' excellent finish allowed the Etneans to get rid of competition from the surprising Cagliari and Valdagno, managing to catch up with Legnano in second place. (Note: Not before, however, a grueling legal battle concerning the Etneans' forfeit victory in Padua due to public intemperance on the penultimate day: while CAF had initially annulled the relevant League resolution, it was then the Federal Council that dissolved CAF and established a new one that restored the original decision.) A play-off in the middle of July was necessary to decide who would be promoted to Serie A as runners-up, which was won by the Lilla over Catania by a score of 4-1. After only one season in Serie B, Legnano then returned to the top flight.

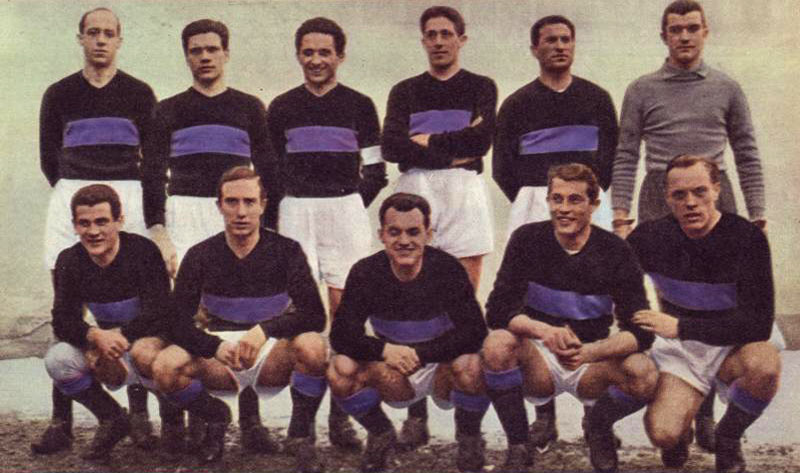
Legnano lineup in 1953-1954, the last to tread the fields of Serie A wearing the second black jersey with lilac stripe

Once again Legnano ended their championship in the top division in last place, immediately returning to Serie B: on the penultimate day of the 1953-1954 season, Legnano was in last place with three other teams, and thus still in the running for salvation (only the last two runners-up would relegate), but the draw obtained on the last day against Novara condemned the Lilla to last place and relegation, having the other three contenders for salvation (SPAL, Palermo and Udinese) won and distanced the Lombards by one point (the three relegation contenders, for the record, being tied on points, were affected by the play-offs, which meant that the Sicilians returned to Serie B, after six years). Since then, the Lilla never returned to Serie A.

The relegation to Serie B, in last place in the standings, in the 1953-1954 season resulted in the resignation of Giovanni Mari as president of Legnano. In the 1954-1955 season Legnano again came close to an immediate return to the top division, finishing in 3rd place in Serie B with 40 points tied with Modena and two points behind Padova, second in the standings and promoted to Serie A along with leading Vicenza: fatal to the non-promotion was the narrow defeat in the direct clash against Padova on the last day, which allowed the Paduans to pull away from the Lilla in the standings and snatch promotion to the top division. Legnano then failed by only two points to win its third consecutive promotion to the top division.

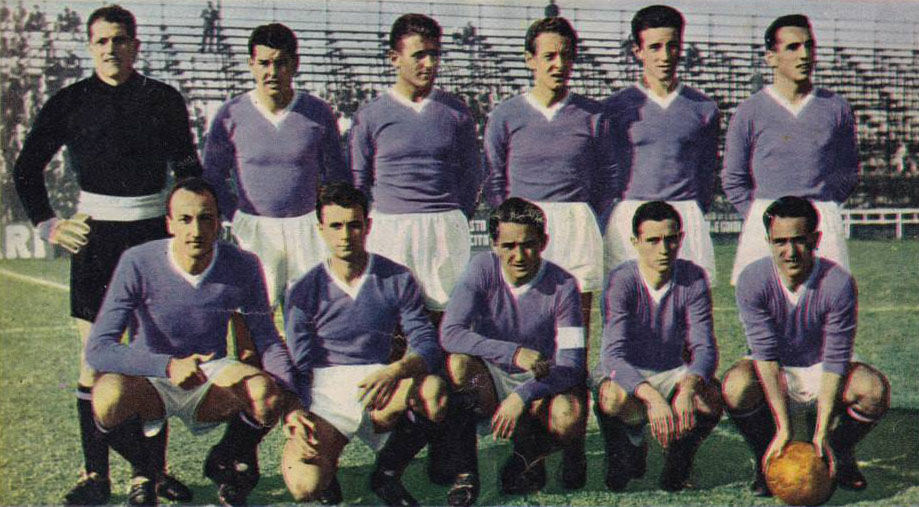
Legnano lineup in 1956-1957, the last to play in the Serie B championship

An inexorable decline followed: already in 1955-1956 Legnano disputed the fourteenth Serie B championship in its history, finishing in 14th place in the standings with 30 points, 8 points behind the penultimate Livorno and first of the relegated, and 19 points behind the leader Udinese. After an excellent start that raised hopes, Legnano experienced a phase of strong regression, which caused it to fall to mid-table. Noteworthy were two matches played on Saturday afternoon, Legnano-Verona on January 14 and Legnano-Marzotto on April 7, which were brought forward in order to be filmed and televised by RAI.

Relegation to the third division came the following year. In the 1956-1957 season Legnano played the fifteenth Serie B championship in its history. The season was very bad and ended in 18th and last place with 23 points, five points behind Taranto, the first of the teams to be saved. Legnano then relegated to Serie C: this was the last Serie B championship played by the Lilla.

In the 1950s there was talk of the merger of Legnano with Pro Patria to form a new football club, Olonia (named after the river that runs through Legnano and passes not far from Busto Arsizio: the Olona), which was supposed to have the white social uniform circled in blue and lilac: however, the initiative was not followed up, although negotiations between the two clubs were at a very advanced stage.

== Between Serie C and D (1957-1978) ==
There followed a twenty-year period of permanence in Serie C (always in group A), in which Legnano was practically never in the fight for promotion to Serie B, often finishing the season in mid-table.

The 1957-1958 season ended with 8th place in the standings with 35 points, seven points behind second-place Vigevano and eight points behind the leading Reggina (both promoted to Serie B). The away trips were onerous because of the travel required to reach the stadiums of the other teams: Serie C was still organized as a single group league, so teams from central and southern Italy were also included in the same tournament.

The 1958-1959 championship was marked by the reform of Serie C, with a return to the organization into multiple groups: in particular, Legnano was placed in Group A. Since from the following year there would be a change from two to three groups, no relegation was planned for this season. The 1958-1959 Serie C season ended for Legnano with 18th place in Group A with 31 points, 6 points behind last-place Pordenone, and 27 points behind first-place Mantova and Siena. In the 1958-1959 Coppa Italia, however, Legnano was eliminated in the first round by Varese; this was the Lilla's last participation in the national cup.

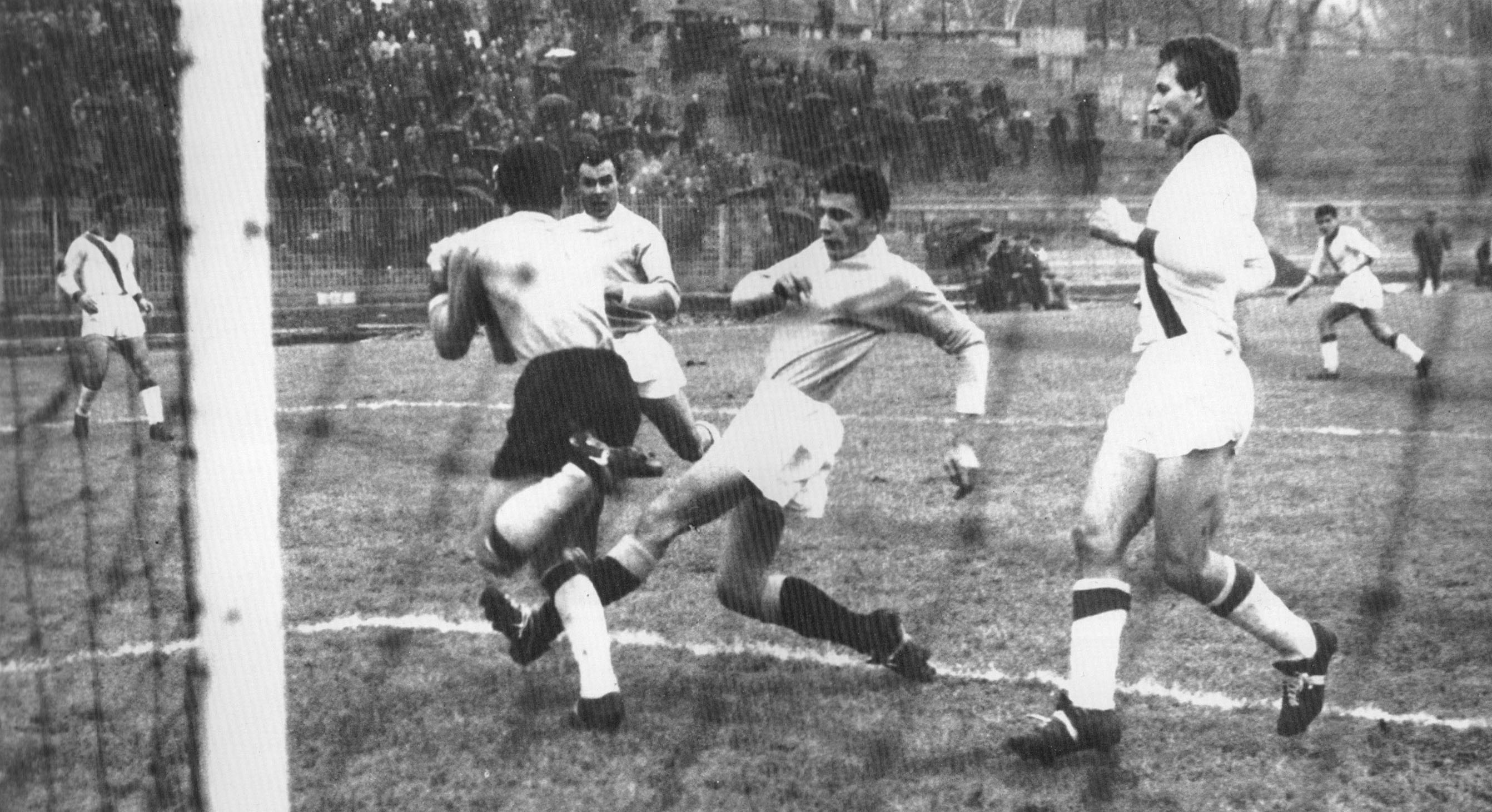
Gigi Riva in action at Legnano in the 1962-1963 season.

In 1959 Luciano Caccia became president of the club, who held the reins of Legnano until 1963, when he left the presidency in favor of an extraordinary commissioner. The seasons under Luciano Caccia's leadership ended in 1959-1960 with a 5th place in the league table in Group A with 39 points, nine points behind the leader Pro Patria and 14 points behind the second-last ranked Vigevano and first among the relegated, in 1960-1961 with a 9th place in the league table in Group A with 34 points, ten less than the leader Modena and five points behind the second-last ranked Piacenza and first among the relegated, in 1961-1962 with 15th place on 29 points, with Saronno and Pro Vercelli on 28 points relegating together with Bolzano last on 15 points, and in 1962-1963 with a 7th place in the standings on 34 points, alongside Rizzoli and Fanfulla, 16 points behind the leading Varese and 9 points behind Casale, which was second-last in the standings and first among the relegated. As for the soccer market of the 1962-1963 season, a young Gigi Riva arrived in the Lilla, who would later become one of the strongest Italian strikers of all time.

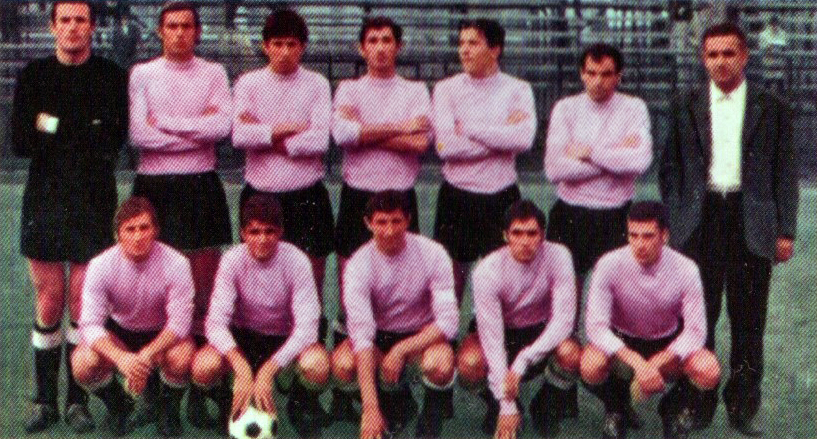
A line-up of A.C. Legnano in the 1968–69 season. From left to right, standing: Castellazzi, O. Lesca, Marella, Gorrino, N. Ulivieri, R. Talarini, S. Realini (coach); crouched: Cappellazzo, Gerosa, Lamera (captain), R. Melgrati, V. Proietti Farinelli.

In the 1963-64 season, Legnano played in the Group A of Serie C, won by Reggiana with 55 points, which was the only team promoted to Serie B: the Lilla finished in 5th place with 34 points in the standings. In the summer of 1964 Augusto Terreni, an entrepreneur in the construction business, became president of Legnano. In the 1964-1965 season, the Lilla finished in 12th place with 30 points, six above the relegation zone and 17 points lower than Novara, which earned promotion to Serie B. The 1965-66 season, played in the Group A of the Serie C, allowed Legnano to struggle in the high standings until five days from the end, when a downturn caused the Lilla to end the championship in 8th place with 36 points, nine less than Savona, the leader and promoted to Serie B.

In the 1966-67 season Legnano disputed the Group A of the Serie C, placing 7th with 34 points, distanced from the pair that won the championship with 50 points, Monza and Como. The Lilla especially suffered from a disappointing away performance. In the 1967-1968 season, Legnano competed in the Group A of Serie C, finishing 8th in the standings with 38 points, 19 points behind leading Como and promoted to Serie B and 11 points behind the relegation zone. In the 1968-1969 season, Legnano competed in the Group A of Serie C, finishing in the middle of the standings, in 10th place with 38 points, 17 points behind leading Piacenza and 6 points from the relegation zone. For the Lilla, the 1969-70 championship, played in the Serie C Group A, ended with the 5th place in the standings, with 42 points, 15 points behind the leader Novara. The season got off to a great start, with four wins and one loss in the first five days. These results temporarily brought the Lilla to the top of the standings. This was followed, however, by several setbacks that brought Legnano down in the standings. In particular, in 1969-1970, the management's goal was to climb back into Serie B, a goal that however was not achieved.

After the expenditures made in the previous championship with the goal to be able to aspire for promotion to Serie B, the club's budget returned to have problems. For this reason, and because of the many offers received by President Augusto Terreni for the lilla players who distinguished themselves in the excellent previous championship, it was decided to sell the best athletes. In the 1970-71 season, Legnano played in the Group A of the Serie C, placing in twelfth position in the standings with 35 points, 23 points behind Reggiana, the leader and promoted to Serie B, and 4 points behind the relegation zone. This poor result was due to the weakening of the squad and the poor scoring streak of the attack. In the 1971-1972 season, Legnano played in the Group A of the Serie C, in which it achieved ninth place in the standings with 39 points shared with Padova, 12 points behind the leading Lecco and 7 points from the relegation zone. After a good start, the Lilla slipped to the penultimate place in the standings at the end of November. With the introduction of some new players, Legnano gradually climbed up the standings, saving itself without major problems.

In the 1972-73 Serie C season, Legnano disputed the Group A, placing twelfth with 34 points, 18 points behind the two leaders Parma and Udinese and two points from the relegation zone. After a scorching start, which brought the Lilla to the top of the standings, Legnano experienced a phase of regression that began with the home defeat, on the 11th day against Vigevano, the team in last place, and that led the Lilla team to gradually fall in the standings. In the 1973-74 Serie C season, Legnano played in the Group A of the Serie C, achieving with 33 points the fifteenth place in the standings, just two points more than the relegated Savona along with Triestina and Derthona. After a disastrous start, which brought Legnano to last place in the standings, the Lilla recovered, saving themselves from relegation to Serie D. At the end of the 1974-1975 season came Legnano's first relegation to Serie D after eighteen consecutive championships in Serie C: the Lilla finished 20th and last on 27 points, eight points from salvation, in the Serie C Group A. The relegation was followed by Augusto Terreni's resignation from the presidency of Legnano.

In the 1975-76 season Legnano competed in the Group B of Serie D, finishing in 4th place with 38 points, six points behind the leading Pergocrema and promoted to Serie C. This championship was characterized by some difficulties for Legnano to beat weaker teams on paper, who were, however, extremely motivated to at least tie the game against the Lilla. In the 1976-77 season Legnano competed in the Group B of the Serie D, almost achieving promotion: with 46 points they placed second, just one point behind Trento, who won the tournament, gaining access to the Serie C.

The 1977-78 season was the last with the structure of the Italian soccer pyramid organized into four national levels (Serie A, B, C and D): from the following season, Serie C was split into two new national levels, Serie C1 and Serie C2, resulting in a considerable increase in the number of teams promoted from Serie D. In the 1977-78 Serie D season, the Lilla finished in 2nd place with 43 points, three lengths behind the leading Pavia, being promoted to the new Serie C2 championship together with Fanfulla, Vigevano and, by F.I.G.C. resolution, Rhodense.

== Between Serie C1, C2 and the National Amateur Championship (1978-2000) ==
In 1978 Legnano was transformed into a joint-stock company: the goal, which was not achieved, however, was to improve the financial situation through popular shareholding. In the 1978-79 season Legnano participated in the Group B of the new Serie C2 championship, placing third last in the standings with 32 points together with Pro Vercelli. It was saved by winning the play-off played on the neutral field of Pavia on June 17, 1979, in which it defeated Pro Vercelli by 3-1. The Lilla's enrollment in the 1979-1980 Serie C2 championship was highly at risk due to major financial difficulties. At this point the Famiglia Legnanese association intervened and managed to find the necessary backers to save Legnano: Giovanni Mari, who had already held this position in the 1950s, was re-elected as president of the Lilla. In the 1979-80 season, Legnano competed in the Group B of Serie C2, finishing in 4th place with 43 points, 5 points away from the promotion zone.

In the 1980-1981 season Legnano disputed the Group A of Serie C2. In spite of a major buying campaign, which had the goal of promotion to Serie C1, the Lilla finished third-last with 29 points, saving themselves thanks to the goal difference. The tournament was won with 48 points by Rhodense and Alessandria, while Biellese and Asti, which were in the last two places of the standings, and Arona, which had the same points as Legnano and Derthona, but with a worse situation in the direct clashes, relegated. The 1981-1982 season began with a change of name from "sports association" to limited liability company. Before the start of the tournament, the municipal stadium in Via Pisacane, which had hosted the Lilla's home matches since 1921, was enlarged and completed with the construction of new sectors and the covers of the central stands. In addition, the area designated for the local press was built. These works were taken on by the Associazione Calcio Legnano. Mindful of the disappointing results of the previous championship, the management decided to revamp the team. In the championship, the Lilla achieved 4th place in the standings with 39 points in the Serie C2 Group A, 6 points away from the promotion zone. The excellent championship finish of the previous season made the club inclined to the reappointment of the coach and the roster. In the 1982-83 season the Lilla dominated the Group B of Serie C2, winning the championship with 52 points in the standings, eight more than the runner-up Fanfulla: both teams gained promotion to Serie C1.

The performance in the 1982-1983 championship was excellent, and this began to make Legnano fans dream. There was so much enthusiasm in the Lilla environment that the idea of a possible promotion to Serie B was raised. However, the response from the field was different: in the 1983-84 season, Legnano played in the Serie C1 Group A, finishing 13th and achieving salvation thanks to 29 points in the standings, two lengths from the relegation zone. In the 1984-85 season, Legnano disputed the Group A of Serie C1, finishing the championship in 9th place in the standings with 32 points, 13 points away from the promotion zone and 2 points from Jesina, the first among the relegated, while in the 1985-1986 season, Legnano achieved 10th place, with 31 points, in the Group A of Serie C1, 16 points away from the leading pair Parma and Modena, both promoted, and 4 points away from the relegation zone. The relegation took place in the following championship: in the 1986-1987 season Legnano was in fact in last place in the standings, with 17 points and 13 lengths from salvation, in the Group A of Serie C1, thus relegating to Serie C2.

Before the start of the 1987-88 season, in June 1987, Giovanni Mari resigned as president of Legnano: Mari was succeeded by his friend and collaborator Ferdinando Villa. In the 1987-88 season, Legnano competed in the Group B of Serie C2, finishing 6th in the standings with 32 points, 9 points away from the promotion zone. Shortly before the start of the season, on September 8, Giovanni Mari died: to commemorate him, on October 11, on the occasion of the heartfelt derby with Pro Patria, the municipal stadium in Via Pisacane was dedicated to the unforgettable president who had just died. During the season, the hypothesis of a merger between Pro Patria and Legnano was revived, but it was never realized.

With the goal of promotion to Serie C1, the roster was strengthened. In the 1988-1989 season, the Lilla competed in the Group B of Serie C2, finishing 3rd in the standings with 40 points, behind the two promoted Chievo (48 points) and Carpi (45 points). In 1989, before the start of the new season, CONI awarded Legnano the Golden Star for Sports Merit with the following motivation:

One of the oldest and most active clubs in the country. Its commitment to propaganda and the care of youth activities has led several of its athletes, such as Allemandi, Castano, Puricelli, Riva and Pulici, to the highest international levels of football.

— Justification for the award of the Gold Star for Sports Merit

Still with the goal of promotion to Serie C1, in light of the excellent results of the second half of the previous season, it was decided to maintain the squad in the face of some adjustments. Before the start of the tournament, Legnano applied for promotion back to the higher division due to the bankruptcy of some Serie C1 clubs, but to no avail. Therefore, in the 1989-1990 season, Legnano played in the Group B of Serie C2, finishing in 5th place in the standings with 37 points, 7 points away from the promotion zone and 11 points from the first among the relegated. In the 1990-1991 season, Legnano took part in the Group B of Serie C2, finishing in 7th place in the standings with 35 points, 9 points away from the promotion zone.

The team then declined, dropping down the rankings in the National Amateur Championship at the end of the 1991-1992 season, with a 20th and last place in the group A 11 points away from salvation, relegating along with Cuneo, Virescit and Valdagno. The tournament was won by Ravenna with 50 points, ahead of Leffe with 47 points, both promoted to Serie C1. This was the lowest point in the Lilla's history, at least until then. Legnano had already played in the Amateur League 15 years earlier, but at that time the Serie D championship was the fourth level of Italian soccer. The National Amateur Championship, on the other hand, with the split of Serie C into Serie C1 and C2 a few years earlier, had become the fifth category of the Italian soccer pyramid.

The return to the professional ranks was immediate: in the 1992-93 season, Legnano won the Group A with 50 points, four points ahead of second-place Saronno and nine points ahead of third-place Fanfulla, immediately moving up to Serie C2. In the tournament for the Amateur Scudetto, the Lilla were eliminated in the semifinals. In the 1993-1994 season, it came close to a second consecutive promotion - this time to C1 - with a 3rd place with 59 points in the Serie C2 Group A: the tournament was won by Crevalcore with 65 points ahead of Ospitaletto with 60 points, both of whom were promoted to Serie C1. For Legnano, the championship was characterized by ups and downs: despite this, the Lilla were in the fight for promotion until the last day.

The 1994-1995 season was characterized by two novelties: three points per win and, for the C1 and C2 Series, play-offs and play-outs were introduced. Legnano competed in Group A of the C2 Series, finishing 8th in the standings with 45 points. The tournament was won with 70 points by Brescello, which was promoted directly to Serie C1 accompanied by Saronno, which instead won in the play-offs. In the 1995-1996 season, Legnano disputed the Serie C2 Group A, placing 14th with 34 points. The Lilla disputed the play-off against Pergocrema, drawing the first game. Three days before the decisive match Lilla president Ferdinando Villa died of an aneurysm. In difficult psychological conditions, the Legnanese were defeated by the Cremasque (1-0) plunging back, after three years, into the amateur ranks.

The Lilla remained among the amateurs for four seasons. In the 1996-1997 season Legnano competed in Group B of the National Amateur Championship, finishing third in the standings with 61 points. The tournament was won by Biellese-Vigliano with 78 points ahead of Casale with 66 points, with the former promoted to Serie C2. The Lilla played an excellent first round, which allowed the team to lead the standings for a long time. In the second half of the championship there was a crisis of results that caused Legnano to descend to third place in the standings, resulting in the failure of the promotion goal. In the 1997-1998 season Legnano disputed the Group B of the National Amateur Championship, placing second in the standings with 64 points, behind Borgosesia, which won the championship being promoted to Serie C2. The Lilla, in this season, never managed to gain the lead in the standings.

In the 1998-1999 season, Legnano competed in Group A of the National Amateur Championship, finishing tenth in the standings with 45 points. The tournament was won with 73 points by Imperia, which gained promotion to Serie C2. In its fourth season in Serie D, in the 1999-2000 championship, Legnano managed to rise back to the professional ranks, and it did so by dominating the Group B with 80 points in the standings, while second-place Pavia got 65. In the Scudetto Dilettanti finals, the Lilla were eliminated in the first round. Shortly after the end of the championship, news shocked the Lilla environment and the city of Legnano: Lilla president Mauro Rusignuolo was arrested by the Guardia di Finanza.

== The first decade of the 21st century (2000-2010) ==
The arrest of president Mauro Rusignuolo at the end of the previous season was a real shock that threw Legnano and the lilla fans into panic. For the club, which was uninvolved in the affair, it was also a big problem to register for the Serie C2 championship, an issue that was overcome due to the considerable economic effort made by the management, which paid out of its own pocket to the Lega Calcio di Serie C the 400 million lire needed for the guaranty. By mid-season Mauro Rusignuolo, having resolved the judicial troubles, returned to chair the club. In the 2000-2001 season Legnano competed in the Serie C2 group A, scoring 40 points in the standings. After coming close to direct salvation, it had to play the play-out against Moncalieri, which was overcome thanks to a 0-0 double draw and the Lilla's better ranking at the end of the regular season. The tournament was then won with 69 points by Padova, which gained direct promotion to Serie C1, while the other promoted side was Triestina, which won the play-offs instead.

At the beginning of the 2001-2002 season, President Mauro Rusignuolo made public his desire to sell Legnano. In the 2001-2002 season, Legnano competed in Group A of the Serie C2 championship, placing eleventh in the standings with 40 points. The tournament was won with 66 points by Prato, which gained direct promotion to Serie C1, while the second promoted was Pro Patria, which won the play-offs.

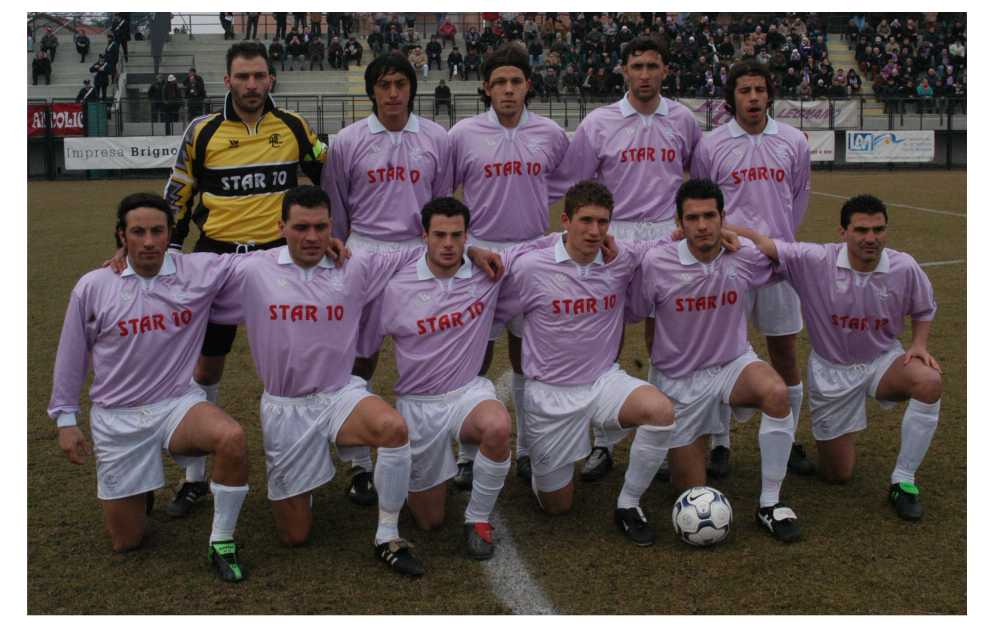
Lineup of the Associazione Calcio Legnano in the 2003-2004 season

Before the start of the 2002-2003 championship, the club was again involved in a very serious crisis that brought Legnano one step away from disappearing from the Italian football scene. The reason lay in the non-arrival of a new buyer: many purchase attempts failed in the summer, which put Legnano at risk of being entered in the Serie C2 championship. The situation was resolved at the last moment thanks to the intermediation of Maurizio Cozzi, mayor of Legnano, who led the negotiations that led to the purchase of the club by Antonio di Bari, former general manager of the Lilla. In the 2002-2003 season, Legnano competed in Group A of the Serie C2 championship, placing eighth in the standings with 47 points, six points away from the play-off zone and eight points away from the play-out zone. The tournament was won with 70 points by Pavia, which gained direct promotion to Serie C1, while the second promoted was Novara, which won the playoffs.

In the 2003-04 season, Legnano played in Group A of the Serie C2 championship. With 41 final points in the standings, to save itself, it had to play the play-out against Savona, which had finished the championship in 16th place with 38 points. With two draws (0-0) and (1-1), and thanks to the best finish in the league, the Lilla did not relegate. The tournament was won by Mantova with 64 points, which gained direct promotion to Serie C1, while the second promoted was Cremonese, who instead won the playoffs. The end of the season was also marked by the dispute between the Lega Calcio di Serie C and the corporation that owned the telephone company 3; the latter intended to sponsor Legnano lavishly in exchange for the transfer of the television rights to the Lilla's matches, the highlights of which would be broadcast on cell phones and in the commercial breaks of RAI's television program Quelli che... il Calcio. The League objected, demanding an adequate economic quid pro quo, a demand that was rejected, causing the deal to fall through: if the deal had gone through, Legnano would have had, at the very least, the necessary funds to set up a Serie C1 team or, perhaps, even higher categories.

In the 2004-2005 season, Legnano competed in Group A of the Serie C2 championship, placing seventh with 50 points in the standings. The tournament was won with 56 points by Pro Sesto, which gained direct promotion to Serie C1, while the second promoted was Pizzighettone, which won the play-offs instead. In the 2005-2006 season, Legnano competed in Group A of the Serie C2 championship, placing tenth in the standings tied with Lecco with 41 points. The tournament was then won with 69 points by Venezia, which gained direct promotion to Serie C1, while the second promoted was Ivrea, which won the play-offs instead. Of note was Pedro Kamata's call-up to the Angolan national team. However, the player could not accept the call-up because FIFA denied consent due to his appearances in the French Under-20 national team. Pedro Kamata was the first foreign player from Legnano to be called up by a major national team.

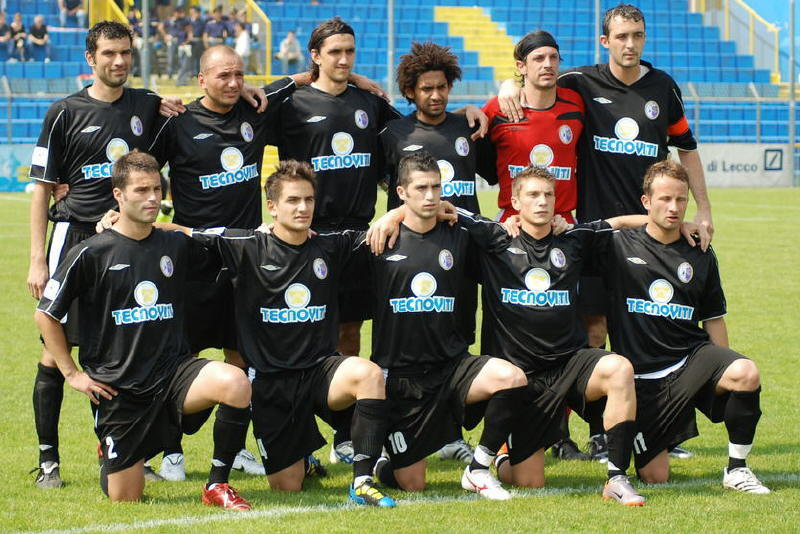
Lineup of the Associazione Calcio Legnano in the 2009-2010 season.

In the 2006-07 season, Legnano competed in Group A of the Serie C2 championship. With 61 points it achieved first place in the standings, directly earning promotion to Serie C1. The second promoted was Lecco, which won the play-offs. In the 2007-2008 season, Legnano competed in Group A of the Serie C1 championship, placing seventh with 48 points. The tournament was won with 63 points by Sassuolo, which gained direct promotion to Serie B, while the second team promoted to the second tier was Cittadella, which won the play-offs instead. In the 2008-2009 season, Legnano played in Group A of the Lega Pro Prima Divisione championship. It placed last in the standings with 30 points and relegated directly to the Lega Pro Second Division (new name of Serie C2) along with Sambenedettese and Pro Sesto, who instead lost the play-outs. The tournament was won by Cesena, which was promoted directly to Serie B, while the second promoted was Padova, which won the play-offs instead.

Legnano ended the 2009-2010 season in third place in the standings of the Lega Pro Second Division Group A with 57 points. The tournament was won with 63 points by Südtirol, which gained direct promotion to the Lega Pro First Division, while the second promoted team was Spezia, which instead won the play-offs against Legnano itself. The Lilla, in this championship, had 2 penalty points (one for administrative irregularities and one for violation of Co.Vi.Soc rules). The season was marked by serious economic difficulties, with delays in the payment of salaries to players and several changes of ownership of the club.

== Bankruptcy, the new club and the reacquisition of the historical name (since 2010) ==
On July 16, 2010, the club, due to its huge indebtedness, was excluded from the Lega Pro and disbarred from all national championships. It was not even possible to register in a regional amateur league for the 2010-2011 season, despite efforts to create a new club in time. Therefore, 2010 marked the end of the historical club's existence.

After a season of absolute standstill, on July 15, 2011, a new team, A.S.D Legnano Calcio 1913, was founded and entered the Lombardy First Category championship for the 2011-2012 season, being placed in the group N. The new club won the championship and gained access to the Promozione, being placed in group A. At the end of the 2012-2013 season, the team came first again, winning the championship and gaining promotion to the Eccellenza league.

In the highest level of regional amateur soccer, the Lilla first placed second in the 2013-2014 season, then fourth in 2014-2015, twice earning admission to the play-offs. Specifically, the path that could have led the Lilla to promotion came to a halt against Magra Azzurri in 2014 and Verbano in 2015.

On May 7, 2015, A.S.D. Legnano 1913 officially acquired the rights to the historical name and emblems of the old club A.C. Legnano, assuming the name Associazione Calcio Legnano, at the end of a long negotiation with the bankruptcy receivership of the old club that ended on April 23, 2015.

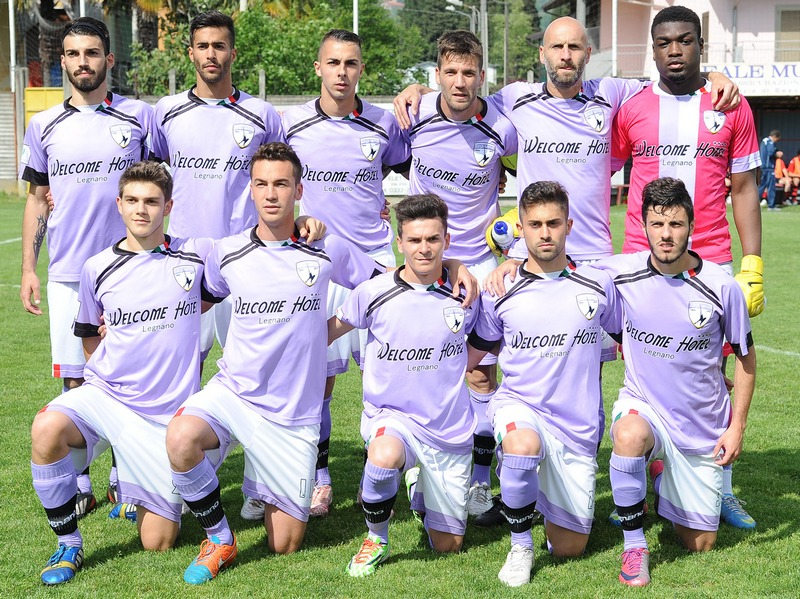
Lineup of A.S.D. Legnano 1913 Calcio in the 2014-2015 season.

In the summer of 2015, the club applied for re-promotion to the 2015-2016 Serie D championship, which, however, was unsuccessful; thus, Legnano appeared for the third consecutive year at the start of the 2015-2016 Eccellenza Lombardia Group A championship, where it found two other illustrious teams from northwest Lombardy: Varese (relegated from Serie B, excluded from the Lega Pro and refounded) and Saronno (reconstituted after five years of inactivity). Precisely Varese won the group by a wide margin, while Legnano took second place and gained direct access to the final of the regional play-offs, played in a one-off game on May 7, 2016 and concluded with a 2-1 victory over Ardor Lazzate and the subsequent qualification to the national phase (where due to the unavailability of the home stadium, home of the concurrent Palio, the lilla opted to play the home matches at the Luigino Garavaglia stadium in Inveruno). In the territorial semifinals, Legnano overcame Torviscosa beating them 2-1 in the first leg and 0-2 in the return, gaining access to the promotion final against St. Georgen: the final double confrontation resulted in a 2-1 win in the first leg in Inveruno and a 2-2 draw in the return leg in San Giorgio di Brunico, which guaranteed the lilla promotion to Serie D.

In the same season, the team also managed to reach the final of the Coppa Italia Dilettanti Lombardia, then lost 2-0 to Ardor Lazzate on December 19, 2015.

The 2016-2017 season turned out to be difficult: in fact, Legnano found itself from the first days in the last positions of the Serie D Group A, risking direct relegation. Not even the change on the bench between Simone Banchieri (called in the summer to replace Aldo Monza) and the veteran of the team Fabrizio Salvigni (who quit playing football to take the post) had no effect of reversing the course. At the same time, in early 2017, owners Gaetano and Vanessa Paolillo (for months fiercely contested by Lilla fans, who accused them of a lack of attachment to the club) announced their disengagement from the corporate leadership, the presidency of which passed to Gigi Cappelletti, while control of the shares was acquired by the family of Giovanni Munafò, who then became lilla president when the season ended. After Cappelletti's appointment as president, and with the arrival of Paolo Tomasoni on the lilla bench, the team had a good final season, breaking away from the bottom of the standings and qualifying for the play-outs against Bustese, which they lost 3-0, relegating to Eccellenza. In the 2017-2018 season, Legnano finished fifth in group A of the Eccellenza Lombardia, while in the Coppa Italia Dilettanti Lombardia the Lilla finished second in group 8, a result that did not allow them to advance to the next round.

In the 2018-2019 season of Eccellenza Lombardia, the Lilla finished in 3rd place in group A of the Eccellenza Lombardia losing the final of the national play-offs and in 2nd place in group 10 of the Coppa Italia Dilettanti Lombardia. At the end of the season they were re-promoted to Serie D, a championship they also played in the 2020-2021, 2021-2022, 2022-2023 and 2023-2024 seasons. In December 2022 there was a change of ownership, with owner Giovanni Munafò selling the club to Emiliano Montanari. In 2024, a new change of ownership took place, with Enea Benedetti replacing Emiliano Montanari as owner and president of the lilla club. The 2023-2024 season then ended with the 16th place in the standings and relegation to Eccellenza following the 5-0 defeat against Castellanzese in the play-out.

== See also ==
- Football in Italy
- Legnano
- Stadio Giovanni Mari

== Bibliography ==
- Giorgio D'Ilario; Iginio Monti (1983). 70 anni color lilla. Legnano: Famiglia Legnanese.
- Carlo Fontanelli (2002). Italia Serie A 1929-2001. Empoli: Geo Edizioni.
- D'Ilario, Giorgio; Iginio Monti, Marco Tajè (1993). Quando si dice lilla. Legnano: Famiglia Legnanese-Banca di Legnano.
- Carlo Fontanelli; Gianfranco Zottino (2004). Un secolo di calcio a Legnano. Empoli: Geo Edizioni.
