= List of ACR Messina seasons =

This is a list of the seasons played by A.C.R. Messina, from their entry into the Prima Divisione in 1921 until the present day. The club's achievements in all major national and international competitions are listed.

Messina's greatest league success is its Serie B title in 1963. This led to the first of two spells in Serie A, which lasted for two years before relegation in 1965. Financial troubles saw the club drop as low as the seventh-division Promozione Sicilia by 1993, but a series of mergers and name changes allowed a meteoric rise in the late 1990s and early 2000s. The club was promoted after winning the sixth-division Eccellenza Sicilia in 1996, and a series of promotions saw them reach Serie A just eight years later. This second spell in the top division lasted three years, and included their best-ever result of 7th in 2005, missing out on a place in the UEFA Cup by just one place.

== U.S. Messinese (1921–22) ==
Season	Division	P	W	D	L	F	A	GD	Pts	Rank
1921–22	Prima Divisione Sicilia (1)	10	4	2	4	31	19	12	10	3rd

== Messina F.C. (1922–24) ==
Season	Division	P	W	D	L	F	A	GD	Pts	Rank
1922–23	Prima Divisione Sicilia (1)	2	1	0	1	2	1	1	2	2nd
1923–24	Prima Divisione Sicilia (1)	2	0	1	1	4	5	-1	1	2nd

== U.S. Messinese (1924–41) ==
Season	Division	P	W	D	L	F	A	GD	Pts	Rank	Finals	P	W	D	L	F	A	GD	Pts	Rank	Cup
1924–25	Prima Divisione; Sicilia (1)	1	1	0	0	3	0	3	2	1st	Sud SF B	6	0	2	4	2	11	-9	2	4th	
1925–26	Prima Divisione; Sicilia (1)	1	0	0	1	1	7	-6	0	2nd	Sud SF A	8	0	0	8	2	29	-27	0	5th	
The structure of Italian football was reorganised in 1926, and Messinese was reassigned to the new third division.
1926–27	Seconda Divisione; Sud D (3)	12							19	1st	Sud	6							4	3rd	
1927–28	Seconda Divisione; Sud D (3)	10	8	1	1	32	12	20	17	1st	Sud	6	1	2	3	7	15	-8	4	4th	
No Seconda Divisione Sud was held in 1928–29.
1929–30	Prima Divisione; Sud (3)	28	14	7	7	57	34	23	35	2nd											
1930–31	Prima Divisione; Sud E (3)	22	12	3	7	50	26	24	27	3rd											
1931–32	Prima Divisione; F (3)	28	18	5	5	75	30	45	41	2nd	Grp B	4	3	0	1	8	3	5	6	1st	
1932–33	Serie B (2)	32	11	8	13	49	53	-4	30	10th											
1933–34	Serie B Grp A (2)	24	11	5	8	38	28	10	27	5th											
1934–35	Serie B Grp A (2)	29	12	8	9	52	45	7	32	8th											
1935–36	Serie B (2)	34	19	6	9	59	52	7	44	4th											R4
1936–37	Serie B (2)	30	11	6	13	39	52	-13	28	10th	Rel P-O	7	4	0	3	16	14	2	8	3rd	PR3
1937–38	Serie B (2)	32	4	7	21	27	75	-48	14	17th											PR3
1938–39	Serie C Grp H (3)	22							27	3rd											Elim C
1939–40	Serie C Grp H (3)	28							30	8th											R1
1940–41	Serie C Grp H (3)	–	–	–	–	–	–	–	–	13th											R1

== U.S. Mario Passamonte (1942–45) ==
Season	Division	P	W	D	L	F	A	GD	Pts	Rank
After an interregnum of one season, Mario Passamonte took Messinese's former spot in Serie C.
1942–43	Serie C Grp N (3)	18							12	5th
No football took place between 1943 and 1945 due to World War II.

== A.S. Messina (1945–47) ==
Season	Division	P	W	D	L	F	A	GD	Pts	Rank	Finals	P	W	D	L	F	A	GD	Pts	Rank
1945–46	Serie C Centrale e Sud F (3)	20							24	5th										
1946–47	Serie C Sud C (3)	20							28	2nd	Sud	10							6	5th

== A.C. Riunite Messina (1947–98) ==
Season	Division	P	W	D	L	F	A	GD	Pts	Rank	Play-offs	Cup	Top Scorer
1947–48	Serie C Sud C (3)	30							33	7th			
1948–49	Serie C Grp D (3)	36							40	4th			
1949–50	Serie C Grp D (3)	34							51	1st			
1950–51	Serie B (2)	40	16	7	17	50	48	2	39	15th			
1951–52	Serie B (2)	38	16	13	9	37	23	14	45	3rd			
1952–53	Serie B (2)	34	15	8	11	42	34	8	38	4th			
1953–54	Serie B (2)	34	9	12	13	23	27	-4	30	10th			
1954–55	Serie B (2)	34	11	14	9	46	43	3	36	7th			
1955–56	Serie B (2)	34	11	9	14	41	45	-4	31	11th			
1956–57	Serie B (2)	34	9	11	14	28	35	-7	29	14th			
1957–58	Serie B (2)	34	8	11	15	23	40	-17	27	16th			
1958–59	Serie B (2)	38	12	14	12	49	42	7	38	10th		R3	
1959–60	Serie B (2)	38	15	7	16	35	38	-3	37	8th		R2	
1960–61	Serie B (2)	38	13	15	10	45	34	11	41	6th		R3	
1961–62	Serie B (2)	38	14	11	13	53	46	7	39	7th		R2	
1962–63	Serie B (2)	38	18	14	6	50	31	19	50	1st		R2	
1963–64	Serie A (1)	34	9	10	15	25	46	-21	28	14th		R1	(Italy) Paolo Morelli, 9
1964–65	Serie A (1)	34	7	8	19	26	44	-18	22	17th		R1	(Italy) Romano Bagatti, 10
1965–66	Serie B (2)	38	9	20	9	27	29	-2	38	7th		R1	
1966–67	Serie B (2)	38	11	15	12	36	40	-4	37	11th		R2	
1967–68	Serie B (2)	40	10	16	14	21	37	-16	36	15th	Rel – 5th	R1	
1968–69	Serie C Grp C (3)	38	10	17	11	31	26	5	37	8th			
1969–70	Serie C Grp C (3)	38	12	15	11	23	21	2	39	7th			
1970–71	Serie C Grp C (3)	38	11	16	11	25	26	-1	38	8th			
1971–72	Serie C Grp C (3)	38	12	14	12	37	38	-1	38	9th			
1972–73	Serie C Grp C (3)	38	11	9	18	31	38	-7	31	18th			
1973–74	Serie D Grp I (4)	34	20	9	5	57	20	37	49	1st			
1974–75	Serie C Grp C (3)	38	14	11	13	39	39	0	39	7th			
1975–76	Serie C Grp C (3)	38	14	14	10	29	22	7	42	5th			
1976–77	Serie C Grp C (3)	38	8	12	18	22	38	-16	28	19th			
1977–78	Serie D Grp I (4)	34	12	15	7	33	21	12	39	6th			
1978–79	Serie C2 Grp D (4)	34	11	14	9	36	29	7	36	5th			
1979–80	Serie C2 Grp D (4)	34	12	7	15	32	31	1	31	13th			
1980–81	Serie C2 Grp D (4)	34	10	12	12	26	30	-4	32	15th			
1981–82	Serie C2 Grp D (4)	34	10	15	9	31	27	4	35	6th			
1982–83	Serie C2 Grp D (4)	34	16	14	4	32	16	16	46	1st			
1983–84	Serie C1/B (3)	34							33	10th			
1984–85	Serie C1/B (3)	34							42	3rd			
1985–86	Serie C1/B (3)	34							45	1st		R2	
1986–87	Serie B (2)	38	12	16	10	29	28	1	40	7th		Grp	
1987–88	Serie B (2)	38	12	11	15	36	38	-2	35	12th		Grp	
1988–89	Serie B (2)	38	13	12	13	46	42	4	38	8th		Grp	
1989–90	Serie B (2)	38	11	12	15	28	44	-16	34	14th	Rel – W	Grp	
1990–91	Serie B (2)	38	9	19	10	34	45	-11	37	12th		R2	
1991–92	Serie B (2)	38	10	13	15	31	38	-7	33	19th		R1	
1992–93	Serie C1/B (3)	34	8	13	13	27	30	-3	29	12th		R1	
Due to financial problems, Riunite Messina was reassigned to the seventh division in 1993.
1993–94	Promozione Sicilia A (7)	32	9	9	14	30	34	-4	27	13th			
1994–95	Eccellenza Sicilia B (6)	34	13	10	11	43	34	9	36	8th			
From 1995, 3 points were awarded for a win.
1995–96	Eccellenza Sicilia B (6)	34	12	12	10	37	31	6	48	8th			
1996–97	Eccellenza Sicilia B (6)	30	9	10	11	28	32	-4	37	10th			
1997–98	Eccellenza Sicilia A (6)	30	9	7	14	42	45	-3	34	14th			
Riunite Messina was dissolved in 1998.

== A.S. Messina (1993–99) ==
Season	Division	P	W	D	L	F	A	GD	Pts	Rank	Play-offs
Messina was founded following Riunite Messina's reassignment to the seventh division in 1993.
1993–94	Campionato Nazionale Dilettanti I (5)	38	17	13	8	57	26	31	47	3rd	
1994–95	Campionato Nazionale Dilettanti I (5)	34	16	12	6	53	26	27	44	3rd	
From 1995, 3 points were awarded for a win.
1995–96	Campionato Nazionale Dilettanti I (5)	34	17	8	9	50	30	20	59	3rd	Scudetto H – 1st
1996–97	Campionato Nazionale Dilettanti I (5)	38	4	8	26	24	79	-55	18	20th	
1997–98	Eccellenza Sicilia B (6)	30	11	7	12	30	24	6	40	7th	
1998–99	Eccellenza Sicilia B (6)	30	0	3	27	17	124	-107	3	16th	
Messina was dissolved in 1999.

== U.S. Peloro (1994–97) ==
Season	Division	P	W	D	L	F	A	GD	Pts	Rank	Play-offs
Peloro was founded by a merger of two Messina clubs, as a rival to both Riunite Messina and A.S. Messina, in 1994.
1994–95	Eccellenza Sicilia B (6)	34	14	12	8	46	34	12	40	4th	
From 1995, 3 points were awarded for a win.
1995–96	Eccellenza Sicilia B (6)	34	23	8	3	58	21	37	77	1st	Prom – W
1996–97	Campionato Nazionale Dilettanti I (5)	38	15	14	9	49	24	25	59	6th	

== F.C. Messina Peloro (1997–09) ==
Season	Division	P	W	D	L	F	A	GD	Pts	Rank	Play-offs	Cup	Top Scorer
1997–98	Campionato Nazionale Dilettanti I (5)	34	21	11	2	62	19	43	74	1st	Scudetto 3 – 2nd		
1998–99	Serie C2 Grp C (4)	34	16	10	8	36	20	16	58	2nd	Play-offs – RU		
1999–2000	Serie C2 Grp C (4)	34	19	13	2	39	13	26	70	1st			
2000–01	Serie C1/B (3)	34	16	13	5	40	26	14	61	2nd	Play-offs – W		
2001–02	Serie B (2)	38	11	14	13	41	42	-1	47	16th		R3	
2002–03	Serie B (2)	38	10	16	12	51	54	-3	46	15th		Grp	
2003–04	Serie B (2)	46	21	16	9	71	45	26	79	4th		Grp	
2004–05	Serie A (1)	38	12	12	14	44	52	-8	48	7th		R2	(Italy) Riccardo Zampagna, 12
2005–06	Serie A (1)	38	6	13	19	33	59	-26	31	17th			(Italy) Arturo Di Napoli, 13
2006–07	Serie A (1)	38	5	11	22	37	69	-32	26	20th		R4	(Italy) Christian Riganò, 19
2007–08	Serie B (2)	42	13	10	19	38	62	-24	49	14th		R1	(Italy) Raffaele Biancolino, 10
In 2008, Messina Peloro gave up its Serie B membership, and was reassigned to the fifth division.
2008–09	Serie D Grp I (5)	36							47	12th			

== A.C. Rinascita Messina (2009–14) ==
Season	Division	P	W	D	L	F	A	GD	Pts	Rank	Play-offs
2009–10	Serie D Grp I (5)	34	10	11	13	41	38	3	41	13th	
2010–11	Serie D Grp I (5)	36	15	8	13	43	48	-5	49	9th	
2011–12	Serie D Grp I (5)	34	16	11	7	50	36	14	59	4th	Prom – R2
2012–13	Serie D Grp I (5)	34	23	8	3	59	24	35	76	1st	Scudetto – Grp
2013–14	Lega Pro Seconda Divisione B (4)	34	15	12	7	43	33	10	57	1st	

== A.C. Riunite Messina 1947 (2014–17) ==
Season	Division	P	W	D	L	F	A	GD	Pts	Rank	Cup	Top Scorer
2014–15	Lega Pro Sud (3)	38	6	16	16	38	55	-17	34	15th	R1	(Italy) Giorgio Corona, 12
2015–16	Lega Pro Sud (3)	34	10	15	9	37	41	-4	45	8th		(Portugal) Diogo Tavares, 10
2016–17	Lega Pro Sud (3)	38	12	10	16	38	52	-14	44	14th	R2	(Italy) Demiro Pozzebon, 8

== A.C.R. Messina (2017–Date) ==
Season	Division	P	W	D	L	F	A	GD	Pts	Rank
2017–18	Serie D Grp I (4)	34	14	11	9	57	39	18	53	6th
2018–19	Serie D Grp I (4)	34	11	10	13	40	44	-4	43	12th
