= Matteo Candolini =

Italian footballer (born 1990)

Personal information
- Full name: Matteo Candolini
- Date of birth: 9 October 1990 (age 36)
- Place of birth: Cantù, Italy
- Height: 1.82 m (6 ft 0 in)
- Position: Left back

Team information
- Current team: FC Morbio

Youth career
- Varese

Senior career*
Years	Team	Apps	(Gls)
2008–2009	Biellese	10	(0)
2009–2011	Savona	55	(0)
2011–2012	Gavorrano	0	(0)
2012–2014	Fenegrò	60	(20)
2014–2015	Dulwich Hamlet	16	(2)
2015	Real Avilés	8	(0)
2015	Fenegrò Calcio	15	(0)
2015–2016	Stresa Sportiva	12	(0)
2016–2017	Albissola 2010	28	(2)
2017–2018	Fenegrò Calcio	32	(5)
2018–2019	Sestese	27	(3)
2019	Stresa Sportiva		(0)
2020	Ardor Lazzate	5	(0)
2020–2021	FC Agno	10	(5)
2021	Rapid Lugano	13	(2)
2022	FC Morbio		(0)
- * Club domestic league appearances and goals as of 14:24, 7 October 2019 (UTC)

Matteo Candolini (born 9 October 1990) is an Italian footballer who plays for FC Morbio as a left back. Besides Italy, Candolini has played in England and Spain.

== Club career ==
Born in Cantù, Candolini made his senior debuts with Biellese. In 2009, he moved to Savona, winning promotion to Lega Pro Seconda Divisione in 2010 and making his professional debuts in the 2010–11 campaign.

On 1 September 2011 Candolini joined Gavorrano, in the same category. After failing to appear for the side, he signed for Fenegrò Calcio in the following year.

In the 2014 summer Candolini moved abroad for the first time in his career, joining Dulwich Hamlet in Isthmian League Premier Division. After appearing in only two league matches he left the club, and switched clubs and countries in February 2015, after agreeing to a deal with Real Avilés in Spanish Segunda División B.

On 27 June 2019, Candolini returned to Associazione Stresa Sportiva for the second time. In December 2019, he then moved to Eccellenza club AC Ardor Lazzate.
