= 1936–37 Serie C =

Serie C
- Season: 1936–37
- Promoted: Sanremese; Vigevano; Padova; Anconitana; Taranto
- Relegated: Carrarese; Pistoiese; Empoli; Montevarchi and many disbanded clubs

The 1936–37 Serie C was the second edition of Serie C, the third highest league in the Italian football league system.

== Southern gift ==
FIGC decided an immediate wider representation of Southern Italy, with shorter travels. Many amatorial southern clubs consequently received a wild card of invitations.

== Legend ==
Promoted
Relegated

== Girone A ==
Pos	Team	Pld	Pts	
1	Padova (P)	26	40	Promoted to 1937–38 Serie B
2	Treviso	26	33	
3	SPAL	26	32	
4	Rovigo	26	30	
5	Ponziana	26	30	
6	DAM Valdagno	26	28	
7	Fiumana	26	27	
8	Mantova	26	27	
9	Vicenza	26	24	
10	Grion Pola	26	23	
11	Udinese	26	21	
12	Carpi	26	20	
13	Pro Gorizia (Note: Later readmitted to 1937–38 Serie C.) (T)	26	17	
14	Fortitudo Trieste (R)	26	10	Relegated to 1937–38 Serie D

Source: Panini
(P) Promoted; (R) Relegated; (T) Qualified, but not yet for the particular phase indicated

== Girone B ==
Pos	Team	Pld	Pts	
1	Vigevano (P)	30	42	Promoted to 1937–38 Serie B
2	Piacenza	30	38	
3	Seregno	30	37	
4	Varese	30	36	
5	Reggiana	30	32	
6	Falck Sesto S.G.	30	32	
7	Pro Patria	30	32	
8	Fanfulla	30	31	
9	Lecco	30	30	
10	Parma	30	29	
11	SIAI Marchetti	30	28	
12	Monza	30	27	
13	Legnano (Note: Later readmitted to 1937–38 Serie C.) (T)	30	26	
14	Crema (T)	30	26	
15	Cusiana Omegna (T)	30	21	
16	Gallaratese (T)	30	14	

Source: Panini
(P) Promoted; (T) Qualified, but not yet for the particular phase indicated

== Girone C ==
Pos	Team	Pld	Pts	
1	Sanremese (P)	30	48	Promoted to 1937–38 Serie B
2	Sestrese	30	46	
3	Rivarolese (E)	30	38	Folded
4	Imperia	30	36	
5	Biellese	30	36	
6	Entella	30	33	
7	Savona	30	33	
8	Asti	30	31	
9	Pinerolo	30	27	
10	Pontedecimo	30	26	
11	Vado	30	26	
12	Corniglianese (E)	30	25	Folded
13	Andrea Doria (Note: Later readmitted to 1937–38 Serie C.) (T)	30	25	
14	Carrarese (R)	30	22	Relegated to 1937–38 Serie D
15	Acqui (T)	30	20	
16	Derthona (T)	30	8	

Source: Panini
(E) Eliminated; (P) Promoted; (R) Relegated; (T) Qualified, but not yet for the particular phase indicated

== Girone D ==
Pos	Team	Pld	Pts	
1	Anconitana (P)	30	42	Promoted to 1937–38 Serie B
2	Pontedera	30	38	
3	Siena	30	35	
4	Ravenna	30	35	
5	Prato	30	34	
6	Grosseto	30	33	
7	Baracca Lugo	30	31	
8	Jesi	30	29	
9	Maceratese	30	29	
10	Sempre Avanti	30	29	
11	Fano	30	28	
12	Pistoiese (Note: Renounced to play in 1937–38 Serie C.) (E, R)	30	27	Folded.
13	Signe	30	25	
14	Libertas Rimini	30	25	
15	Forlì (Note: Later readmitted to 1937–38 Serie C.) (T)	30	24	
16	Forlimpopoli (T)	30	16	

Source: Panini
(E) Eliminated; (P) Promoted; (R) Relegated; (T) Qualified, but not yet for the particular phase indicated

== Girone E ==
Pos	Team	Pld	Pts	
1	Taranto (P)	26	40	Promoted to 1937–38 Serie B
2	Salernitana	26	34	
3	M.A.T.E.R.	26	33	
4	Civitavecchia	26	31	
5	Cosenza	26	28	
6	Foggia	26	28	
7	Manfredonia	26	28	
8	Bagnolese	26	24	
9	Benevento (E)	26	24	Folded.
10	Potenza	26	23	
11	Lecce	26	21	
12	Cerignola (D, R)	26	20	Relegated to 1937–38 Serie D
13	Molfetta (R)	26	16 (Note: 1 point deducted.)	Relegated to 1937–38 Serie D
14	Franco Tosi Taranto (R)	26	13	Relegated to 1937–38 Serie D

Source: Panini
(D) Disqualified; (E) Eliminated; (P) Promoted; (R) Relegated
