= Felice Mariani =

Felice Mariani is the name of:

- Felice Mariani (footballer) (1918–1997), Italian footballer
- Felice Mariani (judoka) (born 1954), Italian politician and former Olympic judoka
