= ASD Gallarate Calcio =

Italian football club

Gallarate Calcio
- Full name: Associazione Sportiva Dilettantistica Gallarate Calcio
- Founded: 1876 (as multi-sport society); 1909 (football division); 1998 (refounded); 2011 (refounded); 2013 (refounded); 2016 (refounded); 2021 (refounded)
- Ground: Stadio Atleti Azzurri d'Italia, Gallarate, Italy
- Capacity: 2,000
- Chairman: Alfonso D'Agata
- Manager: Enco Bortolas
- League: Promozione Lombardy/A
- 2020–21: Prima Categoria/A, suspended
| Home colours | Away colours |

Associazione Sportiva Dilettantistica Gallarate Calcio is an Italian football club based in the City of Gallarate (Varese), Lombardy.

Founded in 1909 as a section of the Gallaratese Gymnastic Society (active since 1876), it was subsequently transformed into an independent club, incurring several dissolutions and re-foundations. In 2018, it merged with the Unione Sportiva Crennese, which changed its name to Crennese Gallaratese, and in 2021 with the Uboldese, achieving the current status.

The club has participated in the Serie B (second national series) two times. In the 1946–1947 season of the Serie B, the club achieved its best-ever finish at the eighth position as part of Group A.

== History ==
=== The beginnings (1909-early 1990s) ===
The Gallaratese Gymnastics Society officially began practicing football in 1909, with the invitation from football companies of the such as Inter and Ausonia. In 1912, the team signed up for its first championship (Terza Categoria) and until 1927, the team played in the regional leagues in Lombardy.

In 1927, the team was promoted to the Second Division. In 1928, the team was admitted to the First Division. In the 1930s and 1940s, it mainly played in the Serie C and at the end of the Second World War it was officially admitted (due to enlargement of the championship) in Serie B. The team played in Serie B ifor three consecutive seasons, returning to Serie C at the end of the 1947–48 season due to the championship reform (reduction of Serie B rounds from three to one).

The club performed poorly during the 1951–52 season and was relegated to the fourth series. The fourth series has changed its name several times, to Serie D, then Interregionale, and finally C.N.D. It remained in this series for about 20 years until it was relegated to the regional championships in 1972. In the 70s, 80s and early 90s, the team played in the Lombard championships with occasional participation in the Serie D.

=== The transformation to Busto Arsizio (1995) ===
At the end of the 1994–1995 season, Gallaratese was promoted to Serie C2. However, when the championship was over, the club decided to move to Busto Arsizio to represent the sporting tradition of the dissolved Pro Patria et Libertate. The club changed its name to Pro Patria Gallaratese Gallarate Busto, maintaining the FIGC registration number of Gallaratese (valid for access to the fourth series). This decision left the city of Gallarate without its biggest football team.

=== Re-foundation and dissolution (1998-2013) ===
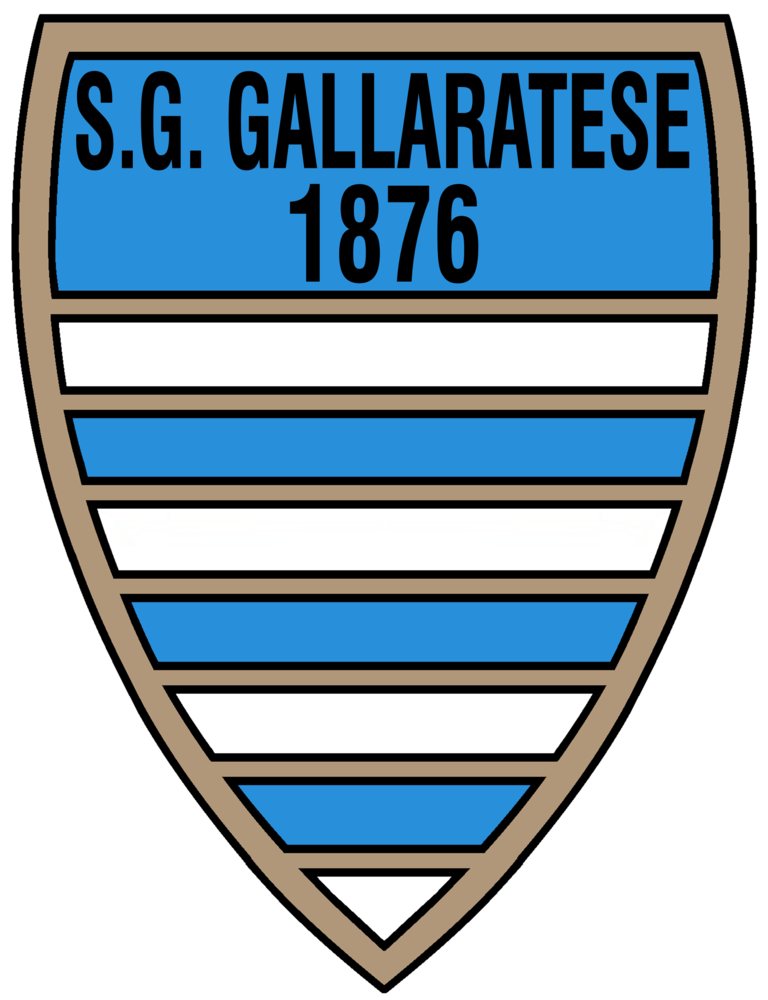

In 1998, after three years of inactivity, the club was re-founded under the name of Società Ginnastica Gallaratese Amateur Sports Association and entered the championship of Third Category.

The quality and the loyalty of the fans allowed the "new Gallaratese" to go up again in Eccellenza within five seasons. The club remained stable in the highest category of regional football until 2007–2008, when they lost the play-off against the football club Luino Calcio.

After two consecutive seasons in Promozione, in 2010, Gallaratese acquired the sport's title of Saronno, allowing the club to play in Serie D 2010–2011. In 2012, the team relegated into Eccellenza, which they decided to join Promozione Lombardia instead.

In the meantime, the club was experiencing growing economic difficulties; at the end of the 2012–2013 championship, the club became financially unsustainable forcing them to cease operations just 15 years after the re-foundation.

=== The second transformation (2015 - present) ===
In 2015, after two years of inactivity, a consortium of members led by Ciro Intermite, Giovanni Meneguz, and Orlando Balconi agreed with the Solbia Sommese for the transfer of the sports title (valid for enrolling in the championship of Eccellenza). However, the attempt was not successful, as the selling club finally decided to accept the offer of A.S.D. Matteotti, who used the title to re-found the Saronno (inactive for several years).

In the summer of 2016, the same consortium decided to act on its own and founded the Gallarate Amateur Sports Association, enrolling it in the Varese group of the Third Category 2016–2017 championship.

During the championship, the "New Gallaratese", made it to the top of the league, which guaranteed their promotion in Second Category.

== Chronicle ==
History of the Gallarate Amateur Sports Association
- 1909 – In February, the Gallaratese Gymnastics Society is a section dedicated to the game of football, after having hosted the friendly match on their field Ausonia-Inter Milan2–2.
- 1909–10 – Not yet affiliated with FIGC, Activity in the high-Milan area.
- 1912 – It is affiliated to F.I.G.C., inaugurated and has its own enclosed field approved.
- 1912–13 – 3rd in group B of the Third Lombard Class.
- 1913–14 – Although affiliated to F.I.G.C. does not participate in any championship. The following season is admitted to the Lombardy Promotion having a playing field larger than the 90x50 required to be able to play.
- 1914–15 – 6th in group C of the Lombardy Promotion.
- 1915-18 – Suspends all activities for war reasons. Reconstituted at the end of hostilities, it is enrolled in the Promotion Championship.
- 1919–20 – 5th in group A of the Lombard Promotion It does not register for the next championship.
- 1920–21 – Affiliated to F.I.G.C. but inactive. It remains faithful to F.I.G.C. to the federal schism.
- 1921–22 – 2nd in group C of the Lombardy Promotion. It is admitted to the Third Division by Compromesso Colombo.
- 1922–23 – 2nd in group F of the Lombard Third Division.
- 1923–24 – 2nd in group C of the Lombard Third Division.
- 1924–25 – 1st in Group A of the Lombard Third Division, having beaten Seregno lo Stelvio-Olona 1–0. 3rd in the semi-final in Lombarda for admission to the play-off promotion.
- 1925–26 – 4ª in group B of the Third Lombard Division (thanks to the best quotient on the net of 1.428 compared to 1.35 in the Varesina).
- 1926–27 – 2nd in group D of the Lombard Third Division. Promoted in Second Division North to organic completion.
- 1927–28 – 3rd in group B of the Northern Second Division. Promoted to the First Division
- 1928–29 – 4th in Group B of the Northern First Division.
- 1929–30 – 6th in Group B of the Northern First Division.
- 1930–31 – 4th in Group C of the First Division.
- 1931–32 – 7ª in Group C of the First Division.
- 1932–33 – 7th in Group A of the First Division.
- 1933 – The S.G. Gallaratese changes its name to Associazione Calcio Gallaratese.
- 1933–34 – 12th in Group C of the First Division.
- 1934–35 – 4th in Group B of the First Division.
- 1935 – The AC. Gallaratese summarizes the original name Gallaratese Gymnastic Society.
- 1935–36 – 14ª in group B of Série C. Initially relegated, then readmitted to organic completion.
- 1936–1937 – 16th in group B of Série C. Initially relegated, then readmitted to organic completion.
- 1937–38 – 4th in group C of the Série C.
- 1938–39 – 7ª in group C of the Série C.
- 1939–40 – 15ª in group C of Série C. Downgraded in First Division, it is then readmitted to organic completion.
- 1940–41 – 4th in group C of the Série C.
- 1941–42 – 3rd in group C of the Série C.
- 1942–43 – 4th in group D of Série C.
- 1943–44 – 3rd in Group C of the Mixed Series Tournament C-First Division organised by the II Zone Directorate (Lombardy).
- 1944–45 – It retired at the end of the first leg of the Lombard Beneficial Tournament organised by the Zone II Directory.
- 1945–46 – 10th in group B of the Mixed Série B–C Alta Italia. Office admitted in Serie B.
- 1946–47 – 8th in group A of Série B.
- 1947–48 – 10th in group A of the Série B. Retrocessa in Serie C.
- 1948–49 – 7th in group A of Série C.
- 1949–50 – 10th in group A of Série C.
- 1950–51 – 7th in group A of Série C.
- 1951–52 – 18th in group A of the Série C. Retrocessa in Series IV.
- 1952–53 – 6th in group A of the Series IV.
- 1953–54 – 5th in group B of the IV Series.
- 1954–55 – 3rd in group B of the IV Series.
- 1955–56 – 8ª in the group B of the IV Series.
- 1956–57 – 6th in group B of the IV Series.
- 1957–58 – 12th in group A of the Interregional I Series.
- 1958–59 – 5th in group B of the Interregional.
- 1959–60 – 14th in group B of the Série D.
- 1960–61 – 5th in group B of Série D.
- 1961–62 – 6th in group B of the Série D.
- 1962–63 – 10th in group B of the Série D.
- 1963–64 – 9th in group B of the Série D.
- 1964–65 – 3rd in group B of the Série D.
- 1965–66 – 4th in group B of the Série D.
- 1966–67 – 3rd in group A of the Serie D.
- 1967–68 – 9th in group B of the Série D.
- 1968–69 – 6th in group A of the Série D.
- 1969–70 – 3rd in group B of the Série D.
- 1970–71 – 13th in Group B of Série D.
- 1971–72 – 17ª in group A of the Série D. Retrocessa in Promozione.
- 1972–73 – 6th in Group C of the Lombardy Promotion.
- 1973–74 – 4th in Group A of the Lombardy Promotion.
- 1974–75 – 4th in group A of the Lombardy Promotion.
- 1975–76 – 15th in Group A of the Lombardy Promotion. Relegated to the First Category Lombardy.
- 1976–1977 – 1st in group D of the First Category Lombardy. Promoted in Lombardy Promotion.
- 1977–78 – 2nd in group A of the Lombardy Promotion.
- 1978–79 – 8th in Group A of the Lombardy Promotion.
- 1979–80 – 5th in Group A of the Lombardy Promotion.
- 1980–81 – 2nd in Group A of the Lombardy Promotion. Admitted to Interregional to organic completion.
- 1981–82 – 11th in Group A of the Interregional.
- 1982–83 – 9th in group B of the Interregional.
- 1983–84 – 8th in group B of the Interregional.
- 1984–85 – 14th in group B of the Interregional. Relegated to Promotion, she is then readmitted to organic completion.
- 1985–86 – 16th in group B of the Interregional. Relegated to the Lombardy Promotion.
- 1986–87 – 13th in Group A of the Lombardy Promotion.
- 1987–88 – 7th in Group A of the Lombardy Promotion.
- 1988–89 – 6th in Group A of the Lombardy Promotion.
- 1989–90 – 1st in group A of the Lombardy Promotion. Promoted in Interregional.
- 1990–91 – 13th in group B of the Interregional. Relegated to Lombardy Excellence.
- 1991–92 – 1st in group A of Lombardy Excellence. Promoted in the National Amateur Championship.
- 1992–93 – 10th in Group A of the National Amateur Championship.
- 1993–94 – 6th in Group B of the National Amateur Championship.
- 1994–95 – 1st in group A of the National Amateur Championship. Promoted in Série C2.
- 1995 – The club transfers its sporting title to Pro Patria and ceases activities.
- 1995–96 – Inactive .
- 1996–97 – Inactive .
- 1997–98 – Inactive .
- 1998 – The club was refounded with the name Gallaratese Gymnastic Society Amateur Sports Association, it moved back to Gallarate and started again from the Third Category Lombardy.
- 1998–99 – 3rd in Group C of the Third Category of the Varese Provincial Committee.
- 1999-00 – 1st in Group C of the Third Category of the Varese Provincial Committee. Promoted to Lombard Category II.
- 2000–01 – 2nd in group Q of the Second Category Lombardy. Promoted in First Category Lombardia.
- 2001–02 – 12th in Group L of the First Category Lombardy.
- 2002–03 – 1st in group L of the First Category Lombardy. He wins the play-off against Arcisatese Audax and is promoted in Lombardy Promotion.
- 2003–04 – 2nd in Group A of the Lombardy Promotion. It wins the play-off against Caronnese and is promoted to Lombard Excellence.
- 2004–05 – 4th in Group A of Lombardy Excellence.
- 2005–06 – 8th in Group A of Lombardy Excellence.
- 2006–07 – 5th in Group A of Lombardy Excellence.
- 2007–08 – 15th in Group A of Lombardy Excellence. It loses the play-out against the Luino and is "relegated to promotion".
- 2008–09 – 6th in Group A of the Lombardy Promotion.
- 2009–10 – 8th in Group A of the Lombardy Promotion.
- 2010 – The club buys the sports title of Saronno, valid to participate in Serie D.
- 2010–11 – 7th in group A of the Série D.
- 2011–12 – 20th in group B of Série D. Relocate in Excellence.
- 2012 – The club declines to participate in Excellence and enrolls in Promotion.
- 2012–13 – 9th in Group A of the Lombardy Promotion.
- 2013 – The club does not enroll in the next league and ceases activities.
- 2013–14 – Inactive .
- 2014–15 – Inactive .
- 2015–16 – Inactive .
- 2016 – The club is re-founded under the name Gallaratese Amateur Sports Association and starts from the Third Category Lombardy.
- 2016–17 – 1st in Group A of the Third Category of the Varese Provincial Committee. Promoted to Lombard Category II.
- 2017–18 – 5th in group M of the Second Category of the Local Committee of Legnano.
- 2018 – The club merged with the Crennese.

== Prize list ==
=== National competitions ===
- Serie D:1st place

1994–1995

=== Regional competitions ===
- Third Division: 1st place

1924–1925

- Eccellenza: 1st place

1991–1992

- Prima Categoria: 2nd place

1976–1977, 2002–2003

=== Provincial competitions ===
- Terza Categoria: 2nd place

1999–2000, 2016–2017

=== Other prizes ===
- Serie C

Third place: 1941–1942

- IT:IV Serie

Third place: 1954–1955 (girone B)

- Serie D

Third place: 1964–1965 (girone B), 1966–1967 (girone A), 1969–1970 (girone B)

- IT:Seconda Divisione

Third place: 1927–1928

- IT:Terza Divisione

Second place: 1922–1923, 1923–1924, 1926–1927

- Promozione

Second place: 1977–1978, 1980–1981, 2003–2004

== Colours and symbols ==
=== Colours ===
Since its foundation, the social colors of Gallaratese are white and blue. The home uniform is a blue jersey with white shorts, while the away uniform reverses the two colors.

=== Official symbols ===
==== Crest ====
The historical crest of the Gallaratese is a Samnite shield with alternating white and blue horizontal bands.

From this basic structure, different design versions have been developed over the years. Sometimes the shield has a golden border, while in some cases the club's name is written in full (and supplemented by the year of foundation) and in others abbreviated in the acronym SGG. The version in use between 1998 and 2013 is more elaborate: the white-blue banded shield overlaps with the corporate name (written in large letters, so as to overflow from the crest) and the design of a soccer ball in motion (emphasized by a sinuous trail that connects with the letters of the name itself). This version is sometimes in solid blue, sometimes with details in red and black.

The coat of arms of the city of Gallarate (ancile truncated silver and red to the two roosters of one in the other, with outward ornamentation from the city), which in Third millennium has assumed a predominant role, being applied to the uniforms in place of other social emblems.

== Facilities ==
=== Stadium ===
At the time of its foundation, in 1909, the Gallaratese football section adopted the Stadio Alessandro Maino as its home ground (named after the original politician of the city), located at the railway station, in the outbuildings of the sports club. The plant has a covered central grandstand on the west side and exposed steps on the north and east sides. Being used only for football, the stands directly overlook the edges of the playing field.

This location, poorly remodeled over the decades, has gradually revealed considerable obsolescence, so that in the two-year period 1994–1995 the team moved to the more modern Atleti Azzurri stadium in Italy, on the northern outskirts of the city. This structure was more modern, but less spacious than its last stadium (since it had a single covered grandstand on the west side). It includes an athletics track and is also used for rugby practice.

In 1998, when the club was refounded, the "Maino" returned to fill the role of the home ground, being again abandoned in favor of the "Atleti Azzurri d'Italia" in 2010 following the repechage of the biancoblù in Serie D.

The Gallaratese then returned to the "Maino" following its second formation, in the 2016–2017 season, only to have to change the facility again the following year, not having found the agreement for the management of the historic city stadium: in 2017– 2018 it, therefore, disputes the internal tenders to Casorate Sempione
