= Pietro Dalle Vedove =

Italian footballer

Personal information
- Date of birth: 19 August 1903
- Place of birth: Cremona, Kingdom of Italy
- Position: Midfielder

Senior career*
| Years | Team | Apps | (Gls) |
| 1924–1929 | Cremonese | 62 | (11) |
| 1929–1930 | Roma | 6 | (0) |
| 1930–1932 | Cremonese | 44 | (18) |
| 1932–1934 | Fanfulla | | |
| 1934–1935 | Soresinese | | |
| 1935–1937 | Fanfulla | | |
- * Club domestic league appearances and goals

Pietro Dalle Vedove (or Delle Vedove in other sources; born 19 August 1903) was an Italian professional football player. He was born in Cremona.

Dalle Vedove played six games in the Serie A in the 1929/30 season for A.S. Roma.
