= 1935–36 Serie B =

Italian football league season

Serie B
- Season: 1935–36
- Champions: Lucchese; 1st title

Serie B 1935-36 team distribution

The Serie B 1935–36 was the seventh tournament of this competition played in Italy since its creation.

== Teams ==
Siena and Taranto had been promoted from Prima Divisione, while Livorno and Pro Vercelli had been relegated from Serie A.

== Events ==
Six teams were relegated in order to reduce the number of participants to sixteen.

== Final classification ==
Pos	Team	Pld	W	D	L	GF	GA	GR	Pts	Promotion or relegation
1	Lucchese (P, C)	34	21	6	7	75	33	2.273	48	Promotion to Serie A
1	Novara (P)	34	21	6	7	61	33	1.848	48	Promotion to Serie A
3	Livorno	34	19	9	6	73	30	2.433	47	
4	Messina	34	19	6	9	59	52	1.135	44	
5	Pisa	34	14	9	11	52	45	1.156	37	
5	Pro Vercelli	34	15	7	12	44	40	1.100	37	
5	Verona	34	14	9	11	48	45	1.067	37	
8	Catania	34	16	1	17	45	47	0.957	33	
8	L'Aquila	34	14	5	15	43	46	0.935	33	
10	Atalanta	34	13	6	15	25	50	0.500	32	
11	Modena	34	13	5	16	43	50	0.860	31	
12	Viareggio	34	8	12	14	43	53	0.811	28	Relegation tie-breaker
13	Pistoiese (R)	34	12	4	18	28	44	0.636	28	Serie C after tie-breaker
14	S.P.A.L. (R)	34	11	6	17	48	59	0.814	28	Serie C after tie-breaker
15	Foggia (R)	34	11	6	17	39	51	0.765	28	Serie C after tie-breaker
16	Siena (R)	34	9	9	16	39	52	0.750	27	Relegation to Serie C
17	Vigevanesi (R)	34	10	7	17	34	51	0.667	27	Relegation to Serie C
18	Taranto (R)	34	5	9	20	20	38	0.526	19	Relegation to Serie C

Source: Panini
(C) Champions; (P) Promoted; (R) Relegated

== Results ==
Home \ Away	ATA	CTN	FOG	LAQ	LIV	LUC	MES	MOD	NOV	PIS	PST	PVE	SIE	SPA	TAR	HEL	VIA	VIG
Atalanta		1–5	1–0	1–0	2–1	0–1	0–2	1–0	0–2	2–2	1–0	1–0	2–2	2–1	1–0	1–0	2–1	0–1
Catania	3–0		5–1	0–2	0–4	0–2	1–0	3–0	4–1	1–0	2–1	1–0	4–0	5–1	1–0	1–1	2–1	1–0
Foggia	0–1	3–1		1–1	1–1	1–0	2–0	2–1	1–0	2–0	2–0	1–1	3–1	1–0	0–1	1–2	1–2	2–0
L'Aquila	2–1	2–0	2–0		1–0	1–1	1–2	0–1	2–0	3–2	3–1	0–1	2–1	0–0	2–0	2–1	1–1	3–2
Livorno	4–0	3–0	3–1	4–0		4–1	6–1	3–0	0–0	1–1	3–1	1–1	3–1	4–0	3–1	5–1	5–1	2–0
Lucchese	4–1	3–0	5–0	3–2	2–1		5–0	4–1	3–0	1–2	4–0	2–1	3–1	4–1	4–1	3–0	2–1	2–0
Messina	0–0	1–0	4–1	2–1	5–2	3–2		1–1	1–0	3–1	1–0	4–2	3–2	3–1	2–1	3–0	4–2	5–1
Modena	4–1	2–0	2–1	3–0	3–4	1–1	2–2		0–2	1–1	0–1	0–1	3–0	1–0	1–0	3–1	1–0	2–0
Novara	2–0	3–0	4–2	2–1	2–0	1–0	5–2	4–1		1–0	2–0	5–1	2–1	3–0	1–0	3–0	2–1	3–1
Pisa	0–1	3–0	2–1	3–1	1–1	2–0	2–0	2–0	3–3		0–0	4–2	2–1	4–4	2–0	3–1	5–0	2–0
Pistoiese	1–0	0–1	1–3	1–0	0–0	3–2	0–1	3–1	0–1	2–0		0–1	0–0	3–1	1–0	2–0	2–1	1–0
Pro Vercelli	2–0	1–3	1–0	2–0	1–1	0–1	2–1	1–3	2–0	1–0	2–0		5–0	2–0	1–0	1–2	4–3	0–0
Siena	4–0	2–0	1–0	3–3	0–0	1–1	0–0	1–0	0–0	0–1	0–1	3–2		4–1	2–0	4–1	0–0	0–1
SPAL	1–1	1–0	3–1	2–1	0–1	0–4	4–0	4–2	1–1	5–0	0–0	1–1	3–1		3–1	0–2	4–2	4–1
Taranto	0–1	3–1	1–1	0–1	0–0	0–1	1–1	0–0	1–1	4–0	2–0	0–0	0–1	0–1		0–0	0–0	3–1
Hellas Verona	5–0	2–0	0–0	2–1	1–0	0–0	4–0	4–1	2–1	2–1	2–0	0–0	1–1	1–0	3–0		2–2	1–1
Viareggio	0–0	2–0	2–2	1–2	1–2	2–2	0–0	1–0	1–1	0–0	4–1	2–0	3–0	2–1	1–0	2–2		1–1
Vigevanesi	0–0	1–0	2–1	2–0	0–1	2–2	0–2	1–2	2–3	1–1	4–2	1–2	2–1	1–0	0–0	3–2	2–0	

Updated to match(es) played on unknown. Source: Almanacco Illustrato del Calcio - La Storia 1898-2004, Panini Edizioni, Modena, September 2005 (in Italian)
Legend: Blue = home team win; Yellow = draw; Red = away team win.

== Relegation play-off ==
=== Classification ===
	Team	Pts	Comments
1.	Pistoiese	5	Tie-breaker
1.	Viareggio	5	Tie-breaker
3.	Foggia	0	Relegated to Serie C
3.	S.P.A.L.	0	Relegated to Serie C

=== Results ===
Played on neutral grounds:

Team 1	Score	Team 2
Foggia	0-6	Pistoiese
Foggia	0-2	Viareggio
Pistoiese	2-1	S.P.A.L.
Pistoiese	1-1	Viareggio
S.P.A.L.	1-6	Viareggio

Tie-breaker
Played in Lucca on July 5:

Team 1	Score	Team 2
Pistoiese	0-2	Viareggio

A.C. Pistoiese were relegated to Serie C.

== References and sources ==
- Almanacco Illustrato del Calcio - La Storia 1898-2004, Panini Edizioni, Modena, September 2005
