= 1937–38 Serie C =

Serie C
- Season: 1937–38
- Promoted: Casale; Fanfulla; SPAL; Siena; Salernitana
- Relegated: many disbanded clubs

The 1937–38 Serie C was the third edition of Serie C, the third highest league in the Italian football league system.

== Legend ==
Promoted
Relegated

== Girone A ==
| Pos | Team | Pld | Pts |
|---|---|---|---|
| 1 | SPAL (P) | 30 | 45 |
| 2 | Vicenza | 30 | 40 |
| 3 | Ponziana | 30 | 39 |
| 4 | Treviso | 30 | 38 |
| 5 | Rovigo | 30 | 35 |
| 6 | Udinese | 30 | 33 |
| 7 | Grion Pola | 30 | 33 |
| 8 | Pro Gorizia | 30 | 31 |
| 9 | Fiumana | 30 | 31 |
| 10 | DAM Valdagno | 30 | 28 |
| 11 | Ampelea Isola d'Istria | 30 | 27 |
| 12 | Audace San Michele | 30 | 26 |
| 13 | Carpi | 30 | 25 |
| 14 | Forlì (Note: Later readmitted to 1938–39 Serie C.) (T) | 30 | 23 |
| 15 | Mantova (T) | 30 | 15 |
| 16 | Caratese (T) | 30 | 11 |

Source: Panini
(P) Promoted; (T) Qualified, but not yet for the particular phase indicated

== Girone B ==
| Pos | Team | Pld | Pts |
|---|---|---|---|
| 1 | Fanfulla (P) | 30 | 42 (Note: Promoted after play-off with Piacenza 2-1.) |
| 2 | Piacenza | 30 | 42 |
| 3 | Reggiana | 30 | 39 |
| 4 | Pro Patria | 30 | 38 |
| 5 | Varese | 30 | 37 |
| 6 | Lecco | 30 | 34 |
| 7 | Legnano | 30 | 34 |
| 8 | Seregno | 30 | 33 |
| 9 | Crema | 30 | 27 |
| 10 | Monza | 30 | 27 |
| 11 | Falck Sesto S.G. | 30 | 25 |
| 12 | SIAI Marchetti | 30 | 24 |
| 13 | Alfa Romeo | 30 | 24 |
| 14 | Isotta Fraschini (R, E) | 30 | 22 |
| 15 | Parma (Note: Later readmitted to 1938–39 Serie C.) (T) | 30 | 17 |
| 16 | Galbani Melzo (R, E) | 30 | 15 |

Source: Panini
(E) Eliminated; (P) Promoted; (R) Relegated; (T) Qualified, but not yet for the particular phase indicated

== Girone C ==
| Pos | Team | Pld | Pts |
|---|---|---|---|
| 1 | Casale (P) | 30 | 42 |
| 2 | Savona | 30 | 37 |
| 3 | Cavagnaro Sestri P. | 30 | 36 |
| 4 | Biellese | 30 | 35 |
| 5 | Gallaratese | 30 | 35 |
| 6 | Asti | 30 | 34 |
| 7 | Imperia | 30 | 30 |
| 8 | Andrea Doria | 30 | 30 |
| 9 | Entella | 30 | 30 |
| 10 | Pavese | 30 | 30 |
| 11 | Vado | 30 | 29 |
| 12 | Cusiana Omegna | 30 | 28 |
| 13 | Acqui | 30 | 27 |
| 14 | Valpolcevera Pontedecimo (Note: Later readmitted to 1938–39 Serie C.) (T) | 30 | 21 |
| 15 | Derthona (T) | 30 | 17 |
| 16 | Pinerolo (T) | 30 | 16 |

Source: Panini
(P) Promoted; (T) Qualified, but not yet for the particular phase indicated

== Girone D ==
| Pos | Team | Pld | Pts |
|---|---|---|---|
| 1 | Siena (P) | 30 | 51 |
| 2 | Ravenna | 30 | 39 |
| 3 | Pontedera | 30 | 34 |
| 4 | Maceratese | 30 | 34 |
| 5 | Prato | 30 | 32 |
| 6 | Baracca Lugo | 30 | 32 |
| 7 | Grosseto | 30 | 32 |
| 8 | Libertas Rimini (Note: Renounced to play in 1938–39 Serie C.) (E, R) | 30 | 32 |
| 9 | Empolese | 30 | 31 |
| 10 | Jesina | 30 | 29 |
| 11 | Signe | 30 | 27 |
| 12 | Fano | 30 | 27 |
| 13 | SAFFA Fucecchio (Note: Renounced to play in 1938–39 Serie C.) (E) | 30 | 26 |
| 14 | Forlimpopoli (Note: Later readmitted to 1938–39 Serie C.) (T) | 30 | 23 |
| 15 | Sempre Avanti (R, E) | 30 | 21 |
| 16 | Viareggio (R, E) | 30 | 10 |

Source: Panini
(E) Eliminated; (P) Promoted; (R) Relegated; (T) Qualified, but not yet for the particular phase indicated

== Girone E ==
| Pos | Team | Pld | Pts |
|---|---|---|---|
| 1 | Salernitana (P) | 24 | 37 |
| 2 | L'Aquila | 24 | 35 |
| 3 | Civitavecchia | 24 | 34 |
| 4 | Catania | 24 | 31 |
| 5 | M.A.T.E.R. | 24 | 28 |
| 6 | Bagnolese | 24 | 26 |
| 7 | Potenza | 24 | 27 |
| 8 | Manfredonia | 24 | 22 |
| 9 | Foggia | 24 | 20 |
| 10 | Stabia | 24 | 19 |
| 11 | SIME Popoli | 24 | 16 |
| 12 | Cosenza (T) | 24 | 13 |
| 13 | Cagliari (T) | 24 | 8 |
| 14 | Lecce (D, T) | (4) | 1 (Note: Retired after 4 matches. All their results were voided. The team was disbanded by the FIGC. Later readmitted to Serie C.) |
| 15 | Catanzarese (E) | 0 | 0 |
| 16 | Ferroviario Catania (E) | 0 | 0 |

Source: Panini
(D) Disqualified; (E) Eliminated; (P) Promoted; (T) Qualified, but not yet for the particular phase indicated
