= 1937–38 Serie B =

Italian football league season

Serie B
- Season: 1937–38
- Champions: Novara; 2nd title

Serie B 1937-38 team distribution

The Serie B 1937–38 was the ninth tournament of this competition played in Italy since its creation.

== Teams ==
Sanremese, Vigevano, Padova, Anconitana and Taranto had been promoted from Serie C, while Novara and Alessandria had been relegated from Serie A.

== Events ==
The league was expanded to seventeen clubs to allow a wider representation of Southern Italy.

== Final classification ==
| Pos | Team | Pld | W | D | L | GF | GA | GR | Pts | Promotion or relegation |
|---|---|---|---|---|---|---|---|---|---|---|
| 1 | Novara (P, C) | 32 | 16 | 11 | 5 | 57 | 23 | 2.478 | 43 | Serie A after tie-breaker |
| 1 | Modena (P) | 32 | 18 | 7 | 7 | 54 | 32 | 1.688 | 43 | Serie A after tie-breaker |
| 3 | Alessandria | 32 | 18 | 7 | 7 | 62 | 34 | 1.824 | 43 | Promotion tie-breaker |
| 4 | Padova | 32 | 18 | 4 | 10 | 49 | 33 | 1.485 | 40 | |
| 5 | Anconitana | 32 | 15 | 8 | 9 | 44 | 31 | 1.419 | 38 | |
| 6 | Pisa | 32 | 15 | 7 | 10 | 54 | 51 | 1.059 | 37 | |
| 7 | Palermo | 32 | 15 | 5 | 12 | 46 | 43 | 1.070 | 35 | |
| 7 | Venezia | 32 | 13 | 9 | 10 | 49 | 47 | 1.043 | 35 | |
| 9 | Sanremese | 32 | 13 | 8 | 11 | 42 | 37 | 1.135 | 34 | |
| 10 | Verona | 32 | 12 | 9 | 11 | 37 | 31 | 1.194 | 33 | |
| 11 | Pro Vercelli | 32 | 13 | 6 | 13 | 54 | 40 | 1.350 | 32 | |
| 12 | Vigevano | 32 | 9 | 12 | 11 | 33 | 39 | 0.846 | 30 | |
| 13 | Spezia | 32 | 9 | 8 | 15 | 34 | 47 | 0.723 | 26 | |
| 14 | Brescia (R) | 32 | 7 | 7 | 18 | 30 | 47 | 0.638 | 21 | Relegation to Serie C |
| 14 | Cremonese (R) | 32 | 6 | 9 | 17 | 28 | 50 | 0.560 | 21 | Relegation to Serie C |
| 16 | Taranto (R) | 32 | 6 | 6 | 20 | 24 | 64 | 0.375 | 18 | Relegation to Serie C |
| 17 | Messina (Note: 1 point deducted.) (R) | 32 | 4 | 7 | 21 | 27 | 75 | 0.360 | 14 | Relegation to Serie C |

Source: Panini
(C) Champions; (P) Promoted; (R) Relegated

== Results ==
| Home \ Away | ALE | ANC | BRE | CRE | MES | MOD | NOV | PAD | PAL | PIS | PVE | SNR | SPE | TAR | VEN | HEL | VIG |
|---|---|---|---|---|---|---|---|---|---|---|---|---|---|---|---|---|---|
| Alessandria | | 2–2 | 4–1 | 6–1 | 5–1 | 1–1 | 0–1 | 1–0 | 4–0 | 2–1 | 3–1 | 4–1 | 2–1 | 1–0 | 1–1 | 2–0 | 3–1 |
| Anconitana | 1–0 | | 2–1 | 0–0 | 4–0 | 1–3 | 0–0 | 2–0 | 1–2 | 1–0 | 0–1 | 1–1 | 3–1 | 7–0 | 1–1 | 0–0 | 0–1 |
| Brescia | 1–2 | 1–0 | | 1–1 | 4–0 | 2–2 | 0–2 | 0–2 | 1–1 | 1–3 | 1–0 | 0–2 | 2–1 | 3–2 | 2–4 | 0–2 | 3–1 |
| Cremonese | 1–4 | 3–1 | 0–0 | | 5–0 | 0–1 | 0–0 | 1–0 | 1–2 | 3–1 | 2–2 | 1–1 | 1–2 | 1–0 | 0–2 | 0–0 | 0–2 |
| Messina | 1–2 | 0–2 | 0–0 | 3–2 | | 0–1 | 1–3 | 0–1 | 1–2 | 3–1 | 2–1 | 1–1 | 1–1 | 5–3 | 2–4 | 1–1 | 0–0 |
| Modena | 1–0 | 1–1 | 2–0 | 2–1 | 3–2 | | 3–0 | 3–1 | 4–0 | 2–0 | 2–0 | 1–2 | 3–2 | 2–1 | 0–0 | 2–1 | 3–0 |
| Novara | 1–1 | 4–0 | 2–0 | 1–0 | 4–1 | 4–1 | | 2–0 | 3–2 | 2–0 | 0–1 | 6–0 | 2–0 | 5–0 | 1–1 | 4–0 | 1–1 |
| Padova | 2–0 | 1–0 | 1–0 | 3–1 | 2–0 | 3–2 | 1–1 | | 5–1 | 5–1 | 0–2 | 2–1 | 2–1 | 2–0 | 1–0 | 2–0 | 7–2 |
| Palermo | 1–1 | 0–2 | 1–1 | 2–0 | 2–0 | 0–2 | 1–1 | 3–0 | | 7–3 | 2–0 | 3–0 | 2–1 | 4–2 | 3–0 | 1–0 | 0–0 |
| Pisa | 2–0 | 5–0 | 1–0 | 3–0 | 2–0 | 2–2 | 2–0 | 0–0 | 1–0 | | 4–2 | 3–1 | 3–1 | 3–0 | 3–1 | 1–0 | 2–2 |
| Pro Vercelli | 1–2 | 0–2 | 2–1 | 0–0 | 3–0 | 1–1 | 1–3 | 0–0 | 0–1 | 9–0 | | 1–0 | 4–2 | 7–0 | 5–1 | 2–1 | 1–1 |
| Sanremese | 5–0 | 0–1 | 1–1 | 4–0 | 4–0 | 1–0 | 0–0 | 2–0 | 3–1 | 2–1 | 1–1 | | 0–0 | 2–0 | 1–0 | 1–3 | 1–0 |
| Spezia | 1–1 | 2–3 | 0–1 | 1–0 | 0–0 | 2–0 | 0–0 | 2–0 | 1–0 | 0–0 | 1–0 | 2–1 | | 1–1 | 1–1 | 2–1 | 0–2 |
| Taranto | 0–4 | 0–2 | 1–0 | 1–0 | 2–0 | 0–0 | 2–2 | 1–3 | 1–0 | 0–0 | 1–2 | 1–0 | 1–2 | | 1–1 | 0–1 | 2–2 |
| Venezia | 1–3 | 0–2 | 1–0 | 2–2 | 3–1 | 1–3 | 1–0 | 3–1 | 1–0 | 3–3 | 3–1 | 1–3 | 5–3 | 1–0 | | 2–0 | 3–0 |
| Hellas Verona | 1–0 | 1–1 | 2–1 | 0–1 | 6–0 | 2–1 | 2–1 | 1–1 | 3–1 | 1–1 | 1–2 | 2–0 | 3–0 | 1–0 | 0–0 | | 1–1 |
| Vigevano | 1–1 | 0–1 | 2–1 | 3–0 | 1–1 | 1–0 | 1–1 | 0–1 | 0–1 | 1–2 | 2–1 | 0–0 | 2–0 | 0–1 | 3–1 | 0–0 | |

Updated to match(es) played on unknown. Source: Almanacco Illustrato del Calcio - La Storia 1898-2004, Panini Edizioni, Modena, September 2005 (in Italian)
Legend: Blue = home team win; Yellow = draw; Red = away team win.

== Promotion tie-breaker ==
| Team 1 | Score | Team 2 |
|---|---|---|
| Alessandria | 0–3 | Modena |
| Alessandria | 2–3 | Novara |

The match Modena-Novara was not played because it wouldn't have influenced the verdict. Modena and Novara were both awarded champions and promoted to Serie A.

== References and sources ==
- Almanacco Illustrato del Calcio - La Storia 1898-2004, Panini Edizioni, Modena, September 2005
