= 1938–39 Serie C =

Serie C
- Season: 1938–39
- Promoted: Brescia; Udinese; Molinella; Catania
- Relegated: many disbanded clubs

The 1938–39 Serie C was the fourth edition of Serie C, the third highest league in the Italian football league system.

== Season ==
A sixth group was created by the FIGC to introduce more clubs from Southern Italy and reducing the travels in that part of the country. After protests from Northern Italy, a seventh and an eighth group were added.

Consequently, there were too much groups, and promotions were transferred to a May tournament between the group winners.

== Legend ==
Promoted
Qualified
Relegated

== Girone A ==
Pos	Team	Pld	Pts
1	Udinese	26	41
2	Treviso	26	37
3	Vicenza	26	34
4	Fiumana	26	31
5	DAM Valdagno	26	31
6	Grion Pola	26	24
7	Rovigo	26	23
8	Arsa (Note: Renounced to play in 1939–40 Serie C.) (E)	26	23
9	Mestrina	26	23
10	Audace San Michele	26	22
11	Ponziana	26	22
12	Pro Gorizia (Note: Later readmitted to 1939–40 Serie C.) (T)	26	18
13	Ampelea Isola d'Istria (T)	26	18
14	CRDA Monfalcone (T)	26	17

Source: Panini
(E) Eliminated; (T) Qualified, but not yet for the particular phase indicated

== Girone B ==
Pos	Team	Pld	Pts
1	Reggiana	26	37
2	Cremonese	26	35
3	Falck Sesto S.G.	26	35
4	Casalini Brescia	26	33
5	Parma	26	30
6	Pavese	26	25
7	Mantova	26	25
8	Caratese	26	25
9	Monza	26	24
10	Piacenza	26	23
11	Lecco	26	23
12	Carpi (Note: Later readmitted to 1939–40 Serie C.) (T)	26	20
13	Cantù (T)	26	18
14	Derthona (R)	26	11

Source: Panini
(R) Relegated; (T) Qualified, but not yet for the particular phase indicated

== Girone C ==
Pos	Team	Pld	Pts
1	Brescia	26	38
2	Varese	26	38
3	Biellese	26	32
4	Pro Patria	26	30
5	Seregno	26	27
6	Legnano	26	26
7	Gallaratese	26	25
8	Alfa Romeo	26	24
9	Omegna	26	24
10	Como	26	23
11	Juventus Domo	26	22
12	Crema (Note: Later readmitted to 1939–40 Serie C. SIAI Marchetti suspended for war.) (T)	26	21
13	SIAI Marchetti (R, E)	26	20
14	FIAT Torino (R)	26	14

Source: Panini
(E) Eliminated; (R) Relegated; (T) Qualified, but not yet for the particular phase indicated

== Girone D ==
Pos	Team	Pld	Pts
1	Savona	24	37
2	Cavagnaro Sestri P.	24	31
3	Valpolcevera Pontedecimo	24	30
4	Acqui	24	29
5	Tigullia	24	25
6	Imperia (Note: Renounced to play in 1939–40 Serie C.) (D, R)	24	25
7	Vado	24	22
8	Albenga	24	21
9	Andrea Doria	24	20
10	Pinerolo	24	20
11	Cuneo	24	18
12	Asti (T)	24	18
13	Entella (Note: Later readmitted to 1939–40 Serie C.) (T)	24	16
14	Milky Genoa (Note: Local club invited to join but it soon refused and disbanded.) (E)	-	0

Source: Panini
(D) Disqualified; (E) Eliminated; (R) Relegated; (T) Qualified, but not yet for the particular phase indicated

== Girone E ==
Pos	Team	Pld	Pts
1	Molinella	24	40
2	Ravenna	24	37
3	Prato	24	30
4	Forlì	24	27
5	Signe	24	25
6	Gambacciani Empoli	24	25
7	Pistoiese	24	23
8	Pontedera	24	22
9	Grosseto	24	20
10	Arezzo	24	20
11	Forlimpopoli	24	19
12	Baracca Lugo (Note: Later readmitted to 1939–40 Serie C.) (T)	24	18
13	Benini Firenze (R, E)	24	6
14	SAFFA Fucecchio (E)	No	0 (Note: Retired before the championship. No match played.)

Source: Panini
(E) Eliminated; (R) Relegated; (T) Qualified, but not yet for the particular phase indicated

== Girone F ==
Pos	Team	Pld	Pts
1	Maceratese	24	40
2	Civitavecchiese	24	33
3	Borzacchini Terni	24	28
4	Vis Pesaro	24	27
5	Cagliari	24	23
6	Fano	24	23
7	Perugia (Note: Renounced to play in 1939–40 Serie C.) (D, R)	24	23
8	Ascoli	24	23
9	Foligno	24	23
10	Sambenedettese	24	19
11	Tiferno	24	19
12	Jesi (T)	24	18
13	Gubbio (T)	24	13
14	Old Rimini (Note: The rests of old Libertas Rimini merged with a local club and restarted as Rimini Calcio in its Regional Championship.) (E)	no	0

Source: Panini
(D) Disqualified; (E) Eliminated; (R) Relegated; (T) Qualified, but not yet for the particular phase indicated

== Girone G ==
Pos	Team	Pld	Pts
1	M.A.T.E.R.	20	31
2	Savoia	20	30
3	SIME Popoli	20	25
4	Bagnolese	20	25
5	L'Aquila	20	24
6	Supertessile Rieti	20	21
7	Stabia	20	19
8	Pescara	20	17
9	Foggia	20	16
10	Pro San Giorgio Fois (E)	20	7
11	Manfredonia	20	5
12	Cerignola (Note: Unsuccessful restoring.) (E)	no	0

Source: Panini
(E) Eliminated

== Girone H ==
Pos	Team	Pld	Pts
1	Catania	22	36
2	Siracusa	22	28
3	Messina	22	27
4	Brindisi	22	26
5	Taranto	22	25
6	Pro Italia Taranto	24	24
7	Palmese (E)	24	18
8	Juventus Siderno	24	17
9	Cosenza	24	17
10	Potenza	24	16
11	La Dominante (Note: Renounced to play in 1939–40 Serie C.) (D, R)	24	2
12	Lecce (D, T)	24	27 (Note: Put in the last spot and relegated by the FIGC but later readmitted.)

Source: Panini
(D) Disqualified; (E) Eliminated; (R) Relegated; (T) Qualified, but not yet for the particular phase indicated

== Final rounds ==
=== Group A (North) ===
Pos	Team	Pld	Pts
1	Brescia (P)	6	8
2	Udinese (P)	6	7
3	Reggiana	6	5
4	Savona	6	4

Source: Panini
(P) Promoted

=== Group B (South) ===
Pos	Team	Pld	Pts
1	Catania (P)	6	7
2	Molinella (P)	6	7
3	M.A.T.E.R.	6	5
4	Maceratese	6	5

Source: Panini
(P) Promoted
