= 1985–86 Serie C1 =

Italian football league season

The 1985–86 Serie C1 was the eighth edition of Serie C1, the third highest league in the Italian football league system.

== Overview ==
=== Serie C1/A ===
Eighteen teams competed in Serie C1/A and Parma won the championship. It was decided that Parma and Modena would be promoted to Serie B. Pavia, Varese, Sanremese were relegated to Serie C2.

=== Serie C1/B ===
Also contested by 18 teams, the Serie C1/B champions were Messina.

== League standings ==
=== Serie C1/A ===
Pos	Team	Pts
1	Parma	47
2	Modena	47
3	Piacenza	45
4	Reggiana	40
5	Virescit Boccaleone	39
6	Spal	38
7	Padova	36
8	Ancona	33
9	Prato	33
10	Trento	31
11	Legnano	31
12	Rondinella Marzocco	31
13	Carrarese	31
14	Fano	30
15	Rimini (T)	30
16	Pavia	27
17	Varese	26
18	Sanremese	19

(T) Qualified, but not yet for the particular phase indicated

=== Serie C1/B ===
Pos	Team	Pts
1	Messina	45
2	Taranto	44
3	Barletta	41
4	Siena	38
5	Casertana	36
6	Salernitana	35
7	Foggia	34
8	Sorrento	32
9	Campania	32
10	Brindisi	32
11	Licata	31
12	Cosenza	31
13	Monopoli	31
14	Livorno	30
15	Casarano	30
16	Benevento (T)	27
17	Ternana	27
18	Cavese (D, R)	36

(D) Disqualified; (R) Relegated; (T) Qualified, but not yet for the particular phase indicated
