= Felice Mariani (footballer) =

Italian footballer (1918–1997)

Personal information
- Date of birth: 11 September 1918
- Place of birth: Caronno Pertusella, Italy
- Date of death: 31 July 1997 (aged 78)
- Position: Midfielder

Senior career*
Years	Team	Apps	(Gls)
1940–1942	Ambrosiana-Inter	10	(0)
1942–1943	Brescia	32	(1)
1943–1944	Novara	16	(0)
1944–1945	Legnano	9	(0)
1945–1951	Brescia	176	(4)
1951–1956	Pavia		
- * Club domestic league appearances and goals

Felice Mariani (11 September 1918 – 31 July 1997) was an Italian professional football player.
