= 1939–40 Serie C =

Serie C
- Season: 1939–40
- Promoted: Reggiana; Savona; Vicenza; Maceratese; Spezia*
- Relegated: many disbanded clubs

The 1939–40 Serie C was the fifth edition of Serie C, the third highest league in the Italian football league system.

== Legend ==
Promoted
Relegated

== Girone A ==
Pos	Team	Pld	Pts
1	Vicenza	26	45
2	Mestrina	26	37
3	DAM Valdagno	26	31
4	Ponziana	26	31
5	CRDA Monfalcone	26	30
6	Fiumana	26	28
7	Rovigo	26	28
8	Grion Pola	26	26
9	Sandonatese	26	26
10	Treviso	26	21
11	Ampelea Isola d'Istria	26	20
12	Lanerossi Schio	26	17
13	Pro Gorizia	26	16
14	Pordenone (R)	26	8
15	Sacilese (E)	no	0

Source: Panini
(E) Eliminated; (R) Relegated

== Girone B ==
Pos	Team	Pld	Pts
1	Reggiana	30	46
2	Mantova	30	42
3	Cremonese	30	37
4	Parma	30	36
5	Audace San Michele	30	34
6	Casalini Brescia	30	34
7	Pavese	30	32
8	Falck Sesto S.G.	30	32
9	Crema	30	32
10	Pirelli Milano	30	32
11	Alfa Romeo	30	30
12	Redaelli Rogoredo	30	29
13	Piacenza	30	24
14	Codogno (R)	30	14
15	Trento (R)	30	14
16	Ardens Bergamo (R)	30	12

Source: Panini
(R) Relegated

== Girone C ==
Pos	Team	Pld	Pts
1	Varese	28	40
2	Seregno	28	39
3	Pro Patria	28	38
4	Lecco	28	35
5	Biellese	28	32
6	Legnano	28	31
7	Cantù	28	29
8	Como	28	27
9	Juventus Domo	28	27
10	Cusiana Omegna	28	25
11	Pro Ponte San Pietro	28	24
12	Monza	28	20
13	Caratese	28	19
14	Gerli Cusano Milanino (R)	28	18
15	Gallaratese (Note: Later readmitted to 1940–41 Serie C.) (T)	28	16

Source: Panini
(R) Relegated; (T) Qualified, but not yet for the particular phase indicated

== Girone D ==
Pos	Team	Pld	Pts
1	Savona	28	42
2	Cavagnaro Genova–Sestri	28	40
3	Casale	28	34
4	Asti	28	33
5	Tigullia	28	32
6	Valpolcevera Pontedecimo	28	31
7	Cuneo	28	29
8	Pinerolo	28	29
9	Albingaunia Albenga	28	28
10	Littorio Rivarolo	28	26
11	Entella	28	24
12	Acqui	28	23
13	Vado	28	17
14	Savigliano (Note: Later readmitted to 1940–41 Serie C.) (T)	28	17
15	Andrea Doria (R)	28	15

Source: Panini
(R) Relegated; (T) Qualified, but not yet for the particular phase indicated

== Girone E ==
Pos	Team	Pld	Pts
1	Spezia	28	43
2	Forlì	28	41
3	Ravenna	28	40
4	Prato	28	38
5	SPAL	28	36
6	Pontedera	28	33
7	Signe	28	30
8	Carpi	28	28
9	Cecina	28	27
10	Gambacciani Empoli	28	22
11	Carrarese	28	21
12	Baracca Lugo	28	19
13	Pistoiese (Note: Renounced to play in 1940–41 Serie C and started a war break until 1945.) (E)	28	18
14	Grosseto (Note: Later readmitted to 1940–41 Serie C.) (T)	28	17
15	Forlimpopoli (T)	28	7

Source: Panini
(E) Eliminated; (T) Qualified, but not yet for the particular phase indicated

== Girone F ==
Pos	Team	Pld	Pts
1	Maceratese	28	41
2	Libertas Rimini	28	37
3	Borzacchini Terni	28	35
4	Arezzo	28	35
5	Aquila Montevarchi	28	33
6	Cagliari (Note: Could not to play in 1940–41 Serie C when the Tyrrhenian Sea became zone of war.) (H, R)	28	31
7	Sambenedettese	28	25
8	Foligno	28	25
9	Tiferno	28	24
10	Gubbio	28	23
11	Fano	28	21
12	Vis Pesaro	28	21
13	Ascoli	28	20
14	San Giovanni V. (T)	28	16 (Note: 1 point deducted.)
15	Jesi (D, R, E)	28	5

Source: Panini
(D) Disqualified; (E) Eliminated; (H) Hosts; (R) Relegated; (T) Qualified, but not yet for the particular phase indicated

== Girone G ==
Pos	Team	Pld	Pts
1	M.A.T.E.R.	28	44
2	Bagnolese	28	37
3	L'Aquila	28	35
4	Stabia	28	34
5	Supertessile Rieti	28	34
6	Interamnia Teramo	28	33
7	Pescara	28	33
8	Dinasimaz Popoli (Note: Renounced to play in 1940–41 Serie C.) (D, R)	28	28
9	Savoia	28	28
10	Civitavecchiese	28	24
11	Orbetello	28	20
12	GIL Terranova Olbia (Note: Could not to play in 1940–41 Serie C when the Tyrrhenian Sea became zone of war.) (H, R)	28	20
13	Alba Motor Roma	28	19
14	Sora (Note: Later readmitted to 1940–41 Serie C.) (T)	28	16
15	Castrum Giulianova (R, E)	28	15

Source: Panini
(D) Disqualified; (E) Eliminated; (H) Hosts; (R) Relegated; (T) Qualified, but not yet for the particular phase indicated

== Girone H ==
Pos	Team	Pld	Pts
1	Taranto	28	40
2	Siracusa	28	39
3	Salernitana	28	38
4	Pro Lecce	28	35
5	Potenza	28	32
6	Pro Italia Taranto (Note: Later merged with Taranto by the fascists.) (E)	28	31
7	Baratta Battipaglia	28	30
8	Messina	28	30
9	Brindisi	28	29
10	Foggia	28	29
11	Molfetta	28	26
12	Cosenza	28	20
13	Diaz Bisceglie	28	20
14	Juventus Siderno (R)	28	19
15	Manfredonia (R)	28	1 (Note: 1 point deducted.)
16	Agrigento (D, R, E)	11	0

Source: Panini
(D) Disqualified; (E) Eliminated; (R) Relegated

== Final rounds ==
=== Girone A ===
Pos	Team	Pld	Pts
1	Reggiana (P)	6	9
2	Savona (P)	6	7
3	Spezia (Note: Promoted by the FIGC in place of Palermo that went bankrupt.) (T, P)	6	7
4	Taranto	6	1

Source: Panini
(P) Promoted; (T) Qualified, but not yet for the particular phase indicated

=== Girone B ===
Pos	Team	Pld	Pts
1	Vicenza (P)	6	11
2	Maceratese (P)	6	6
3	Varese	6	5
4	M.A.T.E.R.	6	2

Source: Panini
(P) Promoted
