= US Sestese Calcio =

Italian football club

Sestese
- Full name: Unione Sportiva Sestese Calcio
- Founded: 1913; 113 years ago
- Ground: Stadio Alfredo Milano, Sesto Calende, Italy
- Chairman: Alberto Brovelli
- Manager: Giorgio Dossena
- League: Eccellenza Lombardy/A
- 2020–21: Eccellenza Lombardy/A, 8th
Home colours	Away colours

Unione Sportiva Sestese Calcio is an Italian association football club located in Sesto Calende, Lombardy. It currently plays in Eccellenza Lombardy.

== History ==
During the fascism the National Afterwork Organization transformed the club into the factory squad of the local aircraft industries SIAI-Marchetti, which funded three years of Serie C.

Sestese was promoted to Serie D after finishing first in Group A of the Eccellenza Lombardy in the 2006–07 season. In the season 2009–10 it was relegated to Eccellenza.

== Colors and badge ==
Its colors are white and blue.
