= 1965–66 Serie C =

Italian football league season

The 1965–66 Serie C was the twenty-eighth edition of Serie C, the third highest league in the Italian football league system.

== Girone A ==
Pos	Team	Pld	W	D	L	GF	GA	GD	Pts	Promotion or relegation
1	Savona	34	18	9	7	58	24	+34	45	Promoted to Serie B
2	Udinese	34	15	13	6	50	25	+25	43	
3	Como	34	14	14	6	36	23	+13	42	
4	Marzotto	34	15	12	7	37	28	+9	42	
5	Biellese	34	14	11	9	48	44	+4	39	
6	Treviso	34	14	9	11	33	28	+5	37	
7	Piacenza	34	14	9	11	28	34	−6	37	
8	Rapallo Ruentes	34	9	18	7	28	21	+7	36	
9	Legnano	34	10	16	8	28	22	+6	36	
10	Solbiatese	34	12	12	10	42	37	+5	36	
11	Monfalcone	34	10	11	13	28	27	+1	31	
12	Triestina	34	9	13	12	23	33	−10	31	
13	Entella	34	10	10	14	21	41	−20	30	
14	Cremonese	34	10	8	16	33	42	−9	28	
15	Mestrina	34	8	11	15	26	35	−9	27	
16	Trevigliese	34	5	16	13	22	36	−14	26	
17	Parma	34	3	19	12	15	28	−13	25	Relegated to Serie D
18	Ivrea	34	6	9	19	28	56	−28	21	Relegated to Serie D

== Girone B ==
Pos	Team	Pld	W	D	L	GF	GA	GD	Pts	Promotion or relegation
1	Arezzo	34	20	11	3	50	14	+36	51	Promoted to Serie B
2	Prato	34	18	14	2	48	22	+26	50	
3	Massese	34	12	16	6	37	21	+16	40	
4	Ternana	34	16	8	10	38	29	+9	40	
5	Cesena	34	11	17	6	28	15	+13	39	
6	Siena	34	11	15	8	31	22	+9	37	
7	Torres	34	9	16	9	20	23	−3	34	
8	Empoli	34	9	14	11	26	33	−7	32	
9	Maceratese	34	10	11	13	30	34	−4	31	
10	Jesi	34	11	9	14	30	43	−13	31	
11	Carrarese	34	8	14	12	20	28	−8	30	
12	Pistoiese	34	8	14	12	22	31	−9	30	
13	Ravenna	34	9	12	13	24	36	−12	30	
14	Rimini	34	6	17	11	24	21	+3	29	
15	Perugia	34	5	19	10	23	31	−8	29	
16	Anconitana	34	8	12	14	18	37	−19	28	
17	Lucchese	34	8	11	15	30	40	−10	27	Relegated to Serie D
18	Carpi	34	8	8	18	24	43	−19	24	Relegated to Serie D

== Girone C ==
Pos	Team	Pld	W	D	L	GF	GA	GD	Pts	Promotion or relegation
1	Salernitana	34	18	13	3	45	14	+31	49	Promoted to Serie B
2	Cosenza	34	16	16	2	38	17	+21	48	
3	Sambenedettese	34	15	10	9	32	25	+7	40	
4	Taranto	34	14	8	12	33	21	+12	36	
5	Avellino	34	12	12	10	39	31	+8	36	
6	Casertana	34	12	12	10	30	24	+6	36	
7	Bari	34	12	12	10	30	26	+4	36	
8	Del Duca Ascoli	34	9	16	9	29	30	−1	34	
9	Pescara	34	11	11	12	37	36	+1	33	
10	Trapani	34	9	15	10	30	32	−2	33	
11	Crotone	34	10	13	11	25	31	−6	33	
12	L'Aquila	34	7	17	10	16	23	−7	31	
13	Lecce	34	7	17	10	19	28	−9	31	
14	Akragas	34	10	10	14	21	29	−8	30	
15	Siracusa	34	10	10	14	31	41	−10	30	
16	Nardò	34	4	18	12	16	32	−16	26	
17	Savoia	34	7	12	15	29	41	−12	26 (Note: Relegated after a play-off match in Rome: Nardò-Savoia 1-0)	Relegated to Serie D
18	Chieti	34	6	12	16	20	39	−19	24	Relegated to Serie D

== References and sources ==
- Almanacco Illustrato del Calcio – La Storia 1898–2004, Panini Edizioni, Modena, September 2005
