= Marco Romano (footballer) =

Italian footballer

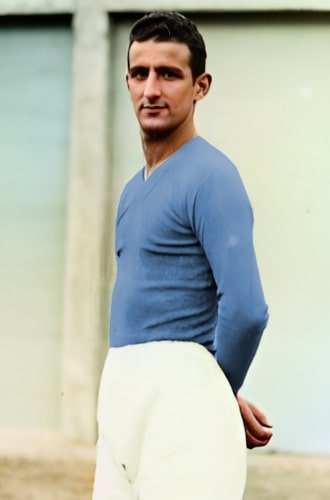
- Romano with Como between 1932 and 1936

Personal information
- Full name: Marco Romano
- Date of birth: 19 September 1910
- Place of birth: Como, Kingdom of Italy
- Date of death: 16 September 1952 (aged 41)
- Place of death: Como, Italy
- Position: Forward

Senior career*
Years	Team	Apps	(Gls)
1928–1934	Como	97	(70)
1934–1941	Novara	178	(94)
1941–1942	Como	2	(1)
1942–1943	Catania	17	(26)
1944	Pro Italia	2	(0)
- * Club domestic league appearances and goals

Marco Romano (Italian pronunciation: [ˈmarko roˈmaːno]; 19 September 1910 – 16 September 1952) was an Italian footballer who played as a forward.

== Career ==
Born on 19 September 1910, Romano was a native of Ponte Chiasso, a hamlet in the municipality of Como on the Swiss border. He first played football in an impromptu team in his hamlet, formed by the commitment of industrialist from Montandon, who owned a factory in the area.

In his professional career, he played for Como and Novara in Serie B, winning the title of top scorer for both clubs: in 1932–33 with 29 goals and in 1934–35 with 30 goals.

At Novara, he also played for four seasons in Serie A. He was the club's all-time top scorer (94; 23 of them in the top division) ahead of Silvio Piola (86) and Raffaele Rubino (92) – before being overtaken by Pablo González (100 goals).

== Honours ==
Como

- Prima Divisione: 1930–31

Novara

- Serie B: 1935–36, 1937–38

Individual

- Serie B Top Scorer: 1932–33, 1934–35
