= 1958–59 Serie B =

Italian football league season

Serie B
- Season: 1958–59
- Champions: Atalanta; 3rd title

Serie B 1958-59 team distribution

The Serie B 1958–59 was the twenty-seventh tournament of this competition played in Italy since its creation.

== Teams ==
Reggiana and Vigevano had been promoted from Serie C, while Atalanta and Hellas Verona had been relegated from Serie A.

== Final classification ==
Pos	Team	Pld	W	D	L	GF	GA	GR	Pts	Promotion or relegation
1	Atalanta (P, C)	38	18	15	5	62	30	2.067	51	Promotion to Serie A
2	Palermo (P)	38	18	13	7	52	28	1.857	49	Promotion to Serie A
3	Lecco	38	16	13	9	50	42	1.190	45	
4	Reggiana	38	17	9	12	45	36	1.250	43	
4	Cagliari	38	15	13	10	48	48	1.000	43	
6	Verona	38	16	10	12	54	43	1.256	42	
7	Como	38	16	8	14	47	42	1.119	40	
7	Simmenthal-Monza	38	14	12	12	42	33	1.273	40	
9	Venezia	38	14	11	13	45	41	1.098	39	
10	Messina	38	12	14	12	49	42	1.167	38	
10	Novara	38	14	10	14	45	48	0.938	38	
12	Taranto	38	11	15	12	37	41	0.902	37	
13	Brescia	38	10	16	12	47	46	1.022	36	
14	Zenit Modena (Note: Zenit Modena F.C. changed its name back to Modena F.C. at the end of the season.)	38	10	14	14	34	45	0.756	34	
14	Marzotto	38	12	10	16	26	36	0.722	34	
16	Catania	38	9	15	14	37	42	0.881	33	
16	Sambenedettese	38	6	21	11	32	44	0.727	33	
18	Parma	38	10	12	16	41	64	0.641	32	
19	Vigevano (R)	38	9	10	19	30	49	0.612	28	Relegation to Serie C
20	Prato (R)	38	8	9	21	31	54	0.574	25	Relegation to Serie C

Source: Panini
(C) Champions; (P) Promoted; (R) Relegated

== Results ==
Home \ Away	ATA	BRE	CAG	CTN	COM	LCO	MAR	MES	NOV	PAL	PAR	PRA	REA	SBN	SMN	TAR	VEN	HEL	VIG	ZMO
Atalanta		1–1	4–1	2–1	1–2	1–1	0–0	5–1	3–1	3–2	2–0	3–1	3–1	5–0	1–1	1–0	0–0	2–1	5–0	1–0
Brescia	1–2		0–1	1–0	0–0	5–3	0–0	1–1	4–0	0–0	2–0	3–0	1–4	3–1	1–0	2–0	1–1	2–2	2–0	0–0
Cagliari	2–2	3–0		1–1	2–0	1–1	2–0	2–1	1–2	1–0	3–0	2–1	2–1	1–0	2–1	1–1	1–0	1–1	3–2	0–0
Catania	0–0	1–1	0–0		1–0	1–1	0–1	2–1	0–0	0–0	3–0	2–2	2–1	1–1	1–1	1–1	1–3	1–2	0–2	3–0
Como	0–0	1–1	1–3	3–1		1–1	4–0	2–0	2–0	1–1	5–2	2–1	0–1	2–2	1–0	2–1	4–0	1–0	1–0	1–1
Lecco	1–2	2–1	1–0	1–1	2–1		2–0	2–2	1–0	0–2	3–0	2–0	1–0	1–1	1–1	3–2	1–0	1–0	2–0	2–0
Marzotto	0–0	0–1	1–0	1–2	2–0	0–1		3–0	0–1	0–1	0–0	1–0	1–0	1–1	1–0	1–0	2–1	2–0	0–1	1–2
Messina	2–2	1–1	2–0	0–0	2–0	1–1	0–0		2–0	2–2	3–0	1–1	1–0	1–1	2–0	3–1	4–0	3–0	2–0	2–0
Novara	0–0	1–1	4–4	0–1	0–1	0–1	6–2	1–0		0–1	2–0	3–1	2–1	1–1	2–2	2–1	0–0	2–0	2–0	3–1
Palermo	1–0	1–0	3–0	1–0	3–1	5–4	1–0	0–2	4–0		7–1	3–0	1–2	0–0	1–0	3–0	1–0	1–0	0–0	1–1
Parma	1–0	2–1	5–1	2–1	3–1	2–1	2–1	0–0	1–2	1–1		3–1	1–2	3–1	1–1	1–1	1–1	0–0	0–1	2–2
Prato	1–1	1–1	0–0	0–2	2–0	0–2	2–1	3–1	4–1	1–1	3–0		0–2	1–0	0–1	0–0	0–3	0–1	1–0	0–1
Reggiana	2–2	3–2	1–1	1–0	1–0	3–1	0–0	0–0	1–3	0–0	1–0	1–0		0–0	3–0	1–1	3–1	2–1	2–0	1–0
Sambenedettese	2–1	2–2	2–0	2–2	2–0	0–0	0–1	0–0	1–1	0–0	1–1	3–1	0–0		1–0	1–1	1–1	1–1	0–0	2–0
Simm.-Monza	0–0	4–2	1–1	2–1	1–2	0–0	2–1	1–0	1–0	3–0	4–0	1–0	3–0	3–1		1–1	2–1	0–0	1–1	0–1
Taranto	1–1	1–0	2–1	1–0	1–0	2–0	1–1	2–1	1–1	1–0	1–1	0–0	0–0	2–0	0–2		1–2	1–3	2–1	2–1
Venezia	2–1	1–1	5–1	3–0	0–0	3–1	0–1	2–1	0–0	2–2	1–1	2–0	2–1	1–0	0–1	1–1		0–1	0–1	1–0
Hellas Verona	0–3	3–0	1–2	2–2	1–3	2–0	3–0	3–1	3–1	2–1	1–0	0–0	2–1	4–0	1–1	1–0	1–2		5–3	4–1
Vigevano	0–1	1–0	1–1	0–1	0–2	0–0	0–0	1–1	1–0	0–1	1–2	4–1	1–2	1–1	1–0	0–2	3–1	1–1		1–3
Zenit Modena	0–1	2–2	0–0	2–1	3–0	2–2	0–0	3–2	0–1	0–0	2–2	0–2	1–0	1–0	1–0	1–1	0–2	1–1	1–1	

Source: Almanacco Illustrato del Calcio - La Storia 1898-2004, Panini Edizioni, Modena, September 2005 (in Italian)
Legend: Blue = home team win; Yellow = draw; Red = away team win.

== References and sources ==
- Almanacco Illustrato del Calcio - La Storia 1898-2004, Panini Edizioni, Modena, September 2005
