= 1936–37 Serie B =

Italian football league season

Serie B
- Season: 1936–37
- Champions: Livorno; 2nd title

Serie B 1936-37 team distribution

The Serie B 1936–37 was the eighth tournament of this competition played in Italy since its creation.

== Teams ==
Cremonese, Venezia, Spezia and Catanzaro had been promoted from Serie C, while Palermo and Brescia had been relegated from Serie A.

== Events ==
Four teams were relegated following the reform of the Serie C and in order to expand the number of participants to seventeen.

== Final classification ==
Pos	Team	Pld	W	D	L	GF	GA	GR	Pts	Promotion or relegation
1	Livorno (P, C)	30	17	8	5	66	20	3.300	42	Promotion to Serie A
2	Atalanta (P)	30	14	11	5	48	25	1.920	39	Promotion to Serie A
3	Modena	30	12	11	7	46	33	1.394	35	
4	Spezia	30	10	14	6	35	23	1.522	34	
5	Pisa	30	13	7	10	40	36	1.111	33	
5	Cremonese	30	13	7	10	40	42	0.952	33	
7	Palermo	30	9	12	9	43	32	1.344	30	
7	Brescia	30	10	10	10	33	34	0.971	30	
9	Verona	30	8	13	9	33	36	0.917	29	
10	Pro Vercelli	30	9	10	11	40	45	0.889	28	Relegation tie-breaker
11	Messina	30	11	6	13	39	52	0.750	28	Relegation tie-breaker
12	Venezia	30	9	10	11	35	35	1.000	28	Relegation tie-breaker
13	Catania (R)	30	9	10	11	35	42	0.833	28	Serie C after tie-breaker
14	L'Aquila (R)	30	8	8	14	36	51	0.706	24	Relegation to Serie C
15	Catanzarese (R, E, R)	30	8	8	14	32	56	0.571	24	Revival in First Division (Note: Catanzarese was unable to retain their professional status in summer 1937 and the FIGC disbanded the first team. The club continued in the Calabrian Championship with its reserve amatorial team, until the war break in 1939.)
16	Viareggio (Note: 1 point deducted.) (R)	30	5	5	20	21	60	0.350	14	Relegation to Serie C

Source: Panini
(C) Champions; (E) Eliminated; (P) Promoted; (R) Relegated

== Results ==
Home \ Away	ATA	BRE	CTN	CTZ	CRE	LAQ	LIV	MES	MOD	PAL	PIS	PVE	SPE	VEN	HEL	VIA
Atalanta		3–1	3–0	2–0	2–0	2–0	1–1	6–2	0–0	1–1	3–0	1–1	4–1	4–1	0–0	2–0
Brescia	1–0		1–1	1–0	1–2	2–0	2–1	0–2	3–0	2–2	1–0	0–1	2–2	2–0	2–0	5–1
Catania	0–0	1–1		1–0	0–1	4–2	1–0	2–1	1–1	0–1	0–0	4–2	0–3	5–0	1–1	1–0
Catanzarese	1–3	0–0	1–1		3–1	3–4	0–2	3–1	3–1	1–1	0–1	3–2	0–0	1–0	3–2	1–1
Cremonese	3–0	1–1	2–1	1–1		2–0	0–1	6–1	1–2	1–0	0–0	2–1	1–0	1–1	2–1	4–2
L'Aquila	1–1	5–1	0–0	2–0	3–2		1–5	0–1	1–1	1–3	2–0	1–1	0–0	0–0	2–1	4–2
Livorno	0–1	2–0	4–1	5–0	4–0	2–0		2–0	1–1	3–0	1–0	5–1	4–1	3–1	6–0	3–0
Messina	1–1	2–1	1–2	2–3	3–0	2–1	4–3		1–3	0–0	2–1	2–0	0–4	1–1	2–1	1–0
Modena	1–0	1–0	5–0	4–0	0–0	6–1	1–5	2–1		3–1	1–2	1–0	0–0	2–1	1–1	4–0
Palermo	1–0	0–0	1–1	5–0	0–1	3–1	1–1	2–2	0–0		0–1	6–0	0–0	1–0	1–2	8–2
Pisa	2–0	3–1	1–3	5–1	1–1	2–1	1–1	2–3	2–2	3–2		0–0	0–1	2–1	2–0	4–1
Pro Vercelli	2–3	0–0	2–1	6–1	5–1	1–1	1–0	0–0	2–0	0–1	1–1		1–2	1–0	3–2	1–1
Spezia	1–2	0–0	1–1	1–0	2–0	1–0	0–0	1–1	2–0	1–1	3–0	2–2		1–1	1–1	4–0
Venezia	2–2	3–0	2–1	0–0	2–2	3–0	1–1	2–0	1–1	4–1	0–1	2–0	1–0		0–0	3–0
Hellas Verona	0–0	1–1	2–0	1–1	4–1	0–0	0–0	2–0	2–1	0–0	4–2	1–1	0–0	2–1		2–1
Viareggio	1–1	0–1	3–1	0–2	0–1	0–2	0–0	1–0	1–1	1–0	0–1	1–2	1–0	0–1	1–0	

Updated to match(es) played on unknown. Source: Almanacco Illustrato del Calcio - La Storia 1898-2004, Panini Edizioni, Modena, September 2005 (in Italian)
Legend: Blue = home team win; Yellow = draw; Red = away team win.

== Relegation tie-breaker ==
=== Classification ===
	Team	Pts
1.	Catania	6
1.	Messina	6
1.	Pro Vercelli	6
1.	Venezia	6

=== Results ===
Home \ Away	CTN	MES	PVE	VEN
Catania		2–1	3–1	2–1
Messina	4–3		3–0	2–1
Pro Vercelli	6–2	5–3		3–2
Venezia	4–0	3–1	1–0	

Updated to match(es) played on 24 January 2009. Source: Almanacco Illustrato del Calcio - La Storia 1898-2004, Panini Edizioni, Modena, September 2005 (in Italian)
Legend: Blue = home team win; Yellow = draw; Red = away team win.

Since all the sides finished the play-off at 6 points, a tie-breaker was needed.

=== Tie-breaker ===
Semifinal North played in Brescia on July 4:

Team 1	Score	Team 2
Pro Vercelli	3-2	Venezia

Semifinal South played in Palermo on July 4:

Team 1	Score	Team 2
Messina	2-0	Catania

Final played in Rome on July 11:

Team 1	Score	Team 2
Venezia	4-0	Catania

Calcio Catania were relegated to Serie C.

== See also ==
- 1936–37 Serie A

== References and sources ==
- Almanacco Illustrato del Calcio - La Storia 1898-2004, Panini Edizioni, Modena, September 2005
