= 1949–50 Serie B =

Italian football league season

Serie B
- Season: 1949–50
- Champions: Napoli; 1st title

Serie B 1949-50 team distribution

The Serie B 1949–50 was the eighteenth tournament of this competition played in Italy since its creation.

== Teams ==
Fanfulla, Udinese, Prato and Catania had been promoted from Serie C, while Livorno and Modena had been relegated from Serie A.

== Events ==
A provisional fifth relegation was added to reduce the league.

== Final classification ==
Pos	Team	Pld	W	D	L	GF	GA	GR	Pts	Promotion or relegation
1	Napoli (P, C)	42	27	7	8	76	34	2.235	61	Promotion to Serie A
2	Udinese (P)	42	26	8	8	78	39	2.000	60	Promotion to Serie A
3	Legnano	42	25	7	10	86	52	1.654	57	
4	S.P.A.L.	42	24	7	11	95	65	1.462	55	
5	Modena	42	22	8	12	76	43	1.767	52	
6	Brescia	42	17	14	11	81	64	1.266	48	
6	Spezia	42	21	6	15	69	55	1.255	48	
8	Livorno	42	19	8	15	61	59	1.034	46	
9	Pisa	42	13	15	14	56	50	1.120	41	
9	Verona	42	17	7	18	68	68	1.000	41	
9	Siracusa	42	17	7	18	68	71	0.958	41	
12	Catania	42	15	10	17	54	61	0.885	40	
13	Salernitana	42	15	9	18	58	56	1.036	39	
13	Cremonese	42	14	11	17	56	57	0.982	39	
13	Vicenza	42	15	9	18	63	67	0.940	39	
16	Fanfulla	42	16	6	20	63	71	0.887	38	
17	Reggiana	42	15	7	20	56	64	0.875	37	
18	Alessandria (R)	42	15	6	21	70	74	0.946	36	Relegation to Serie C
19	Empoli (R)	42	14	7	21	51	69	0.739	35	Relegation to Serie C
20	ArsenalTaranto (R)	42	15	2	25	56	96	0.583	32	Relegation to Serie C
21	Prato (R)	42	8	10	24	55	97	0.567	26	Relegation to Serie C
22	Pro Sesto (R)	42	6	1	35	35	119	0.294	13	Relegation to Serie C

Source: Panini
(C) Champions; (P) Promoted; (R) Relegated

== Results ==
Home \ Away	ALE	ARS	BRE	CTN	CRE	EMP	FAN	LEG	LIV	MOD	NAP	PIS	PRA	PSE	REA	SAL	SIR	SPA	SPE	UDI	HEL	VIC
Alessandria		2–1	0–0	3–1	3–0	2–0	2–0	2–1	2–1	1–2	2–2	1–0	1–1	6–1	4–1	3–2	2–0	5–0	2–3	1–2	0–1	5–1
ArsenalTaranto	2–1		2–2	2–1	3–0	2–0	0–2	0–2	1–2	1–0	3–4	2–1	2–1	2–1	1–3	6–3	2–0	1–4	1–0	0–3	2–1	2–1
Brescia	3–2	2–0		3–0	1–1	5–3	2–2	3–1	0–1	1–1	1–5	0–0	5–0	3–1	6–1	0–1	5–2	2–2	4–1	3–1	0–1	4–0
Catania	3–0	2–1	1–1		2–1	1–2	5–0	0–0	0–0	3–0	0–1	1–1	3–3	1–0	2–4	1–0	1–1	2–1	0–0	1–1	2–1	2–1
Cremonese	1–0	3–0	1–1	1–1		1–1	2–3	2–2	5–0	1–1	1–3	2–0	3–1	2–0	2–2	2–1	0–1	1–2	2–0	2–1	3–0	1–1
Empoli	1–1	2–1	0–1	5–1	0–2		1–0	2–0	2–2	2–0	1–0	0–0	3–1	2–1	2–1	2–0	1–1	1–3	1–0	1–3	0–1	2–0
Fanfulla	2–2	4–1	1–2	2–0	1–2	3–1		0–0	2–0	3–3	1–4	0–1	2–1	6–1	2–1	2–1	3–0	1–2	4–0	1–5	4–1	0–3
Legnano	4–1	3–1	2–2	4–3	1–0	3–1	2–0		1–1	1–0	1–4	3–2	5–1	3–0	2–1	2–0	3–2	5–1	2–0	6–1	4–1	2–0
Livorno	4–1	2–0	5–0	1–0	1–0	3–0	1–0	2–1		3–1	1–0	0–0	3–1	3–1	0–2	0–0	4–0	3–1	2–1	0–1	2–2	2–1
Modena	2–1	4–0	0–1	2–1	3–1	3–0	5–0	2–1	2–0		0–0	3–2	5–1	6–0	1–0	1–0	4–0	1–2	3–0	3–1	2–1	4–1
Napoli	4–0	2–1	3–0	2–1	3–0	4–1	1–0	1–0	0–0	3–0		1–0	3–1	4–0	3–1	1–0	1–0	3–1	1–5	1–0	1–1	1–0
Pisa	2–1	3–1	5–1	1–2	1–2	3–2	1–2	1–1	2–2	1–0	1–0		5–2	6–1	3–0	1–0	1–1	2–1	1–1	0–0	0–0	2–1
Prato	3–1	1–3	4–0	0–1	0–0	2–1	2–2	3–4	4–3	0–1	1–0	0–0		4–1	1–0	1–3	1–2	3–3	1–2	1–1	2–1	0–0
Pro Sesto	0–1	2–3	2–6	0–1	0–1	1–1	1–2	0–2	2–1	2–5	0–1	1–0	2–0		1–2	2–1	2–1	1–4	0–1	0–2	2–3	2–1
Reggiana	3–1	4–1	3–2	0–1	3–1	1–1	0–1	1–1	0–2	0–0	2–2	2–1	2–2	4–0		1–0	4–1	1–0	1–0	0–4	3–1	0–1
Salernitana	2–0	1–1	0–2	2–2	2–2	1–0	2–0	1–2	1–0	3–1	1–1	1–1	1–0	3–1	2–0		4–1	1–1	5–0	2–1	0–0	3–1
Siracusa	5–0	6–1	2–2	3–1	1–0	2–1	2–0	0–1	4–1	3–2	0–0	2–2	5–0	6–1	1–0	3–1		1–0	0–4	2–1	3–1	3–3
SPAL	4–2	8–2	2–1	2–0	3–0	1–0	5–3	2–0	6–1	0–0	2–1	1–0	5–1	7–1	0–0	4–1	2–0		2–1	1–1	2–1	2–0
Spezia	2–1	7–0	2–2	3–0	2–1	2–0	0–0	2–4	2–0	0–0	0–2	3–1	5–1	3–0	1–0	1–0	1–0	4–2		2–0	3–1	4–3
Udinese	2–2	2–1	1–0	2–0	1–0	4–0	1–0	1–0	3–0	1–0	3–2	0–0	1–0	5–0	3–0	4–2	3–1	4–2	0–0		4–0	1–0
Hellas Verona	3–2	2–0	2–2	1–2	3–2	1–2	2–1	5–1	5–1	0–2	0–1	2–2	6–2	2–1	2–1	1–1	3–0	5–0	2–1	0–1		1–0
Vicenza	2–1	2–0	0–0	3–2	2–2	5–3	3–1	0–3	2–1	1–1	1–0	4–0	1–1	2–0	2–1	1–3	2–0	2–2	3–0	2–2	4–1	

Source: Almanacco Illustrato del Calcio - La Storia 1898-2004, Panini Edizioni, Modena, September 2005 (in Italian)
Legend: Blue = home team win; Yellow = draw; Red = away team win.

== References and sources ==
- Almanacco Illustrato del Calcio - La Storia 1898-2004, Panini Edizioni, Modena, September 2005
