= 1939–40 Serie B =

Italian football league season

Serie B
- Season: 1939–40
- Champions: Atalanta; 2nd title

Serie B 1939-40 team distribution

The Serie B 1939–40 was the eleventh tournament of this competition played in Italy since its creation.

== Teams ==
Brescia, Udinese, Molinella and Catania had been promoted from Serie C, while Livorno and Lucchese had been relegated from Serie A.

== Final classification ==
Pos	Team	Pld	W	D	L	GF	GA	GR	Pts	Promotion or relegation
1	Atalanta (P, C)	34	19	9	6	62	31	2.000	47	Promotion to Serie A
2	Livorno (P)	34	21	4	9	84	35	2.400	46	Promotion to Serie A
3	Lucchese	34	18	8	8	63	45	1.400	44	
4	Anconitana	34	16	9	9	54	34	1.588	41	
5	Siena	34	15	10	9	49	34	1.441	40	
6	Brescia	34	16	8	10	54	39	1.385	40	
7	Alessandria	34	16	6	12	59	41	1.439	38	
8	Padova	34	15	7	12	69	57	1.211	37	
9	Pro Vercelli	34	14	6	14	62	67	0.925	34	
10	Udinese	34	14	5	15	60	57	1.053	33	
11	Fanfulla	34	12	8	14	45	44	1.023	32	
12	Pisa	34	11	9	14	54	62	0.871	31	
13	Verona	34	12	7	15	41	56	0.732	31	
14	Palermo (E, R, R)	34	11	7	16	39	69	0.565	29	Revival in First Division (Note: Palermo was unable to retain their professional status in summer 1940 and the FIGC disbanded the first team. The club continued in the Sicilian Championship with its reserve amatorial team, then it merged with city-mate Juventina to return in Serie C in 1941. The FIGC then fastly decided with its fascist powers that Molinella was too poor to be restored in B.)
15	Molinella (R)	34	10	6	18	42	62	0.677	26	Relegation to Serie C
16	Vigevano (R)	34	9	5	20	44	70	0.629	23	Relegation to Serie C
17	Sanremese (R)	34	6	9	19	27	60	0.450	21	Relegation to Serie C
18	Catania (R)	34	3	13	18	24	69	0.348	19	Relegation to Serie C

Source: goal average officially used in event of equal points.
(C) Champions; (E) Eliminated; (P) Promoted; (R) Relegated

== Results ==
Home \ Away	ALE	ANC	ATA	BRE	CTN	FAN	LIV	LUC	MOL	PAD	PAL	PIS	PVE	SNR	SIE	UDI	HEL	VIG
Alessandria		0–1	0–0	3–1	5–0	3–2	1–1	5–0	1–0	2–1	8–0	2–2	2–0	1–5	2–0	1–1	2–0	2–0
Anconitana	3–0		1–0	1–1	2–1	1–0	2–1	1–1	3–1	1–1	2–1	1–0	2–1	8–0	2–0	2–0	2–0	3–1
Atalanta	1–0	3–0		3–0	1–0	3–1	2–2	3–1	2–2	3–0	1–0	3–0	3–1	0–0	1–1	1–1	1–0	6–0
Brescia	4–1	2–2	1–0		4–0	1–0	2–1	1–0	2–1	2–2	4–1	2–0	2–0	1–0	0–0	4–2	0–0	2–0
Catania	0–4	1–1	1–4	0–0		1–1	1–4	3–1	2–0	0–1	1–1	1–1	0–0	1–1	1–1	0–0	1–1	2–1
Fanfulla	2–0	1–3	1–1	1–0	2–0		0–1	1–1	5–0	2–1	1–0	3–0	1–1	7–2	3–1	2–0	2–1	0–0
Livorno	2–1	1–0	3–0	3–3	7–0	3–0		3–1	3–1	6–2	5–0	4–1	6–2	2–0	2–0	0–2	5–0	3–1
Lucchese	1–0	2–1	1–2	2–1	3–1	4–0	1–0		2–1	4–2	4–3	2–0	0–0	2–0	2–2	6–0	5–1	4–0
Molinella	1–0	0–0	0–2	1–0	3–3	2–0	1–0	1–3		3–0	1–1	2–2	6–1	4–0	1–0	2–0	0–2	1–3
Padova	1–1	3–2	2–1	0–6	2–0	3–0	2–1	1–2	5–0		6–0	4–2	4–0	1–0	1–1	5–0	0–2	4–0
Palermo	0–3	1–0	1–0	4–2	1–0	1–1	1–3	1–1	1–0	1–3		2–0	1–4	1–1	2–0	1–0	2–0	2–2
Pisa	2–2	1–1	4–4	2–1	4–1	2–0	1–1	1–1	4–0	2–1	1–2		0–4	3–2	0–2	3–4	3–0	3–2
Pro Vercelli	3–0	1–0	2–2	4–1	4–0	2–2	1–0	6–2	3–2	2–3	4–3	2–3		0–1	1–1	1–0	5–2	3–2
Sanremese	0–1	1–1	0–3	1–1	0–0	1–2	1–3	0–1	1–1	3–1	2–1	1–1	0–1		0–2	1–0	1–0	1–1
Siena	4–0	2–1	1–2	1–0	2–0	2–1	1–0	1–1	4–0	0–0	1–1	1–3	1–0	3–0		2–1	5–1	3–0
Udinese	2–4	2–1	3–1	0–1	3–1	2–1	2–0	2–0	3–1	2–2	5–0	0–1	8–1	2–0	4–1		6–3	1–2
Hellas Verona	1–0	2–2	1–2	3–1	3–0	0–0	1–4	1–2	3–1	2–2	2–0	2–1	2–0	1–0	0–0	0–0		2–0
Vigevano	0–2	2–1	0–1	0–1	1–1	1–0	1–4	0–0	1–2	4–3	1–2	2–1	5–2	3–1	1–3	6–2	1–2	

Updated to match(es) played on unknown. Source: Almanacco Illustrato del Calcio - La Storia 1898-2004, Panini Edizioni, Modena, September 2005 (in Italian)
Legend: Blue = home team win; Yellow = draw; Red = away team win.

== References and sources ==
- Almanacco Illustrato del Calcio - La Storia 1898-2004, Panini Edizioni, Modena, September 2005
