= 1932–33 Serie B =

Italian football league season

Serie B
- Season: 1932–33
- Champions: Livorno; 1st title

Serie B 1932-33 team distribution

The 1932–33 Serie B was the fourth tournament of this football competition played in Italy since its creation.

== Teams ==
Grion Pola, Messina and Sampierdarenese had been promoted from Prima Divisione, while Brescia and Modena had been relegated from Serie A.

== Final classification ==
Pos	Team	Pld	W	D	L	GF	GA	GD	Pts	Promotion or relegation
1	Livorno (P, C)	32	22	7	3	72	23	+49	51	Promotion to Serie A
2	Brescia (P)	32	23	4	5	54	19	+35	50	Promotion to Serie A
3	Modena	32	17	4	11	58	41	+17	38	
4	Spezia	32	14	9	9	46	47	−1	37	
5	Novara	32	13	9	10	59	50	+9	35	
6	Verona	32	12	10	10	47	45	+2	34	
6	Comense	32	15	4	13	51	53	−2	34	
8	Sampierdarenese	32	13	7	12	55	47	+8	33	
9	Vigevanesi	32	13	6	13	42	48	−6	32	
10	Messina	32	11	8	13	49	53	−4	30	
11	Serenissima Venezia	32	11	5	16	40	41	−1	27	
12	Cremonese	32	9	8	15	48	60	−12	26	
12	Legnano	32	9	8	15	41	53	−12	26	
14	Cagliari	32	9	6	17	37	60	−23	24	
14	Grion Pola	32	9	6	17	38	72	−34	24	
16	Atalanta (T)	32	9	5	18	52	60	−8	23	Reinstated (Note: Atalanta and Pistoiese were later readmitted to Serie B due to reforming of the championship.)
17	Pistoiese (T)	32	7	6	19	29	46	−17	20	Reinstated
18	Monfalcone (D, R)	0	0	0	0	0	0	0	1 (Note: Monfalcone retired after 6 days and a single point won. All their matches were voided.)	Relegation to Prima Divisione

Source: RSSSF; Panini
(C) Champions; (D) Disqualified; (P) Promoted; (R) Relegated; (T) Qualified, but not yet for the particular phase indicated

== Results ==
Home \ Away	ATA	BRE	CAG	COM	CRE	GRP	LEG	LIV	MES	MOD	MFA	NOV	PST	SAM	SEV	SPE	HEL	VIG
Atalanta		1–2	6–0	0–3	1–1	5–2	4–3	1–2	1–3	1–2		6–1	0–1	2–0	2–1	7–0	2–3	1–0
Brescia	2–1		1–0	3–1	3–0	5–0	2–0	1–0	3–0	1–0		2–0	1–0	2–1	1–0	1–2	3–1	5–0
Cagliari	1–1	0–0		2–0	3–2	1–2	2–0	1–1	1–0	1–0		1–0	1–1	4–0	3–0	0–1	0–1	3–1
Comense	2–1	1–3	3–2		1–0	2–0	3–0	0–4	2–0	3–2		4–2	3–0	1–0	1–1	1–2	0–0	4–0
Cremonese	3–0	0–2	4–2	5–2		3–2	0–1	1–1	3–2	0–1		0–2	4–1	2–2	1–2	1–1	1–1	6–1
Grion Pola	2–1	0–1	1–0	1–3	3–2		1–2	0–2	0–0	2–3	~~2–1~~ (Note: Monfalcone retired after 6 days. All their matches were voided.)	1–2	2–1	4–2	0–0	4–1	2–2	2–1
Legnano	2–0	0–0	1–1	4–0	1–1	0–0		0–1	2–0	1–2		1–1	2–1	1–1	1–0	3–2	2–0	2–4
Livorno	2–1	3–1	2–1	4–2	5–0	8–0	4–1		7–0	4–1		3–1	1–0	1–0	4–1	2–1	1–0	1–1
Messina	1–1	0–1	3–0	2–4	6–0	3–0	2–1	1–1		2–0		5–1	2–1	1–1	3–2	4–1	3–0	2–3
Modena	6–1	0–0	1–1	3–1	2–0	2–3	5–2	2–0	4–0		~~7–2~~	3–1	3–0	5–2	1–0	0–1	2–2	3–1
Monfalcone							~~1–2~~	~~0–3~~				~~0–0~~						
Novara	4–1	2–0	6–2	4–1	2–2	1–1	2–0	2–2	6–0	3–0			0–1	1–1	1–0	2–2	2–3	1–1
Pistoiese	1–1	0–2	2–0	0–1	2–3	3–0	4–1	0–0	3–3	0–1	~~2–0~~	0–0		1–2	2–0	0–2	2–0	0–0
Sampierdarenese	1–2	2–3	5–1	2–0	2–0	6–0	2–0	1–0	2–0	2–0		2–3	3–1		1–0	2–2	2–2	3–0
Serenissima V.	4–0	2–1	3–1	1–1	2–3	3–1	1–1	1–2	2–1	0–1		2–0	3–0	0–0		2–0	4–1	2–1
Spezia	1–1	0–0	4–1	4–1	0–0	3–1	3–2	1–1	0–0	2–0		1–2	1–0	2–0	3–1		1–1	2–1
Hellas Verona	1–0	1–2	2–1	0–0	2–0	3–0	3–2	0–2	0–0	2–2		2–2	2–1	2–3	2–0	5–0		2–1
Vigevanesi	3–0	1–0	6–0	1–0	1–0	1–1	1–1	0–1	0–0	2–1		0–2	2–0	4–2	1–0	1–0	2–1	

Source: Almanacco Illustrato del Calcio - La Storia 1898-2004, Panini Edizioni, Modena, September 2005 (in Italian)
Legend: Blue = home team win; Yellow = draw; Red = away team win.

== Involvement of Achille Starace ==
The new secretary of the Fascist Party which was appointed in 1933, Achille Starace, disliked the incumbent FIGC’s chairman Leandro Arpinati. He obtained Arpinati to be fired and arrested by Mussolini after false accusations of infidelity. His hate was strong enough that he imposed to the new chairman Giorgio Vaccaro the disbandment of the Serie B round robin, the main creation of Arpinati's sport career. They denied a return to a north–south division of the league, so a west–east division was introduced, with rising costs considering Italy's shape.
