= 1934–35 Serie B =

Italian football league season

Serie B
- Season: 1934–35
- Champions: Genoa; 1st title

The Serie B 1934–35 was the sixth tournament of this competition played in Italy since its creation. This championship was organized with two groups.

== Teams ==
Aquila Calcio, Pisa Calcio, Lucchese and Catania Calcio had been promoted from Prima Divisione, while Padova Calcio, Genoa CFC and Casale Calcio had been relegated from Serie A. Cagliari Calcio, Derthona, Vicenza Calcio and Venezia FC had been re-elected by the Higher Directory to expand the league.

== Events ==
Eight teams for each group were relegated in order to restore the single table. Two teams (one for each group) retired during the tournament. In the Western group, A.C. Pavia retired after 20 days and only the matches played in the first half of the season (the andata) were considered valid. In the Eastern group Grion Pola retired after 15 matches and all their matches were voided.

== Group A ==
Serie B 1934-35 Girone A team distribution

=== Final classification ===
Pos	Team	Pld	W	D	L	GF	GA	GR	Pts	Promotion or relegation
1	Genova 1893 (P)	29	18	6	5	48	23	2.087	42	Promotion to Serie A
2	Novara	29	17	5	7	60	33	1.818	39	
3	Pisa	29	15	7	7	52	34	1.529	37	
3	Catania	29	16	5	8	45	35	1.286	37	
5	Vigevanesi	29	14	7	8	67	34	1.971	35	
5	Viareggio	29	15	5	9	43	32	1.344	35	
7	Lucchese	29	13	8	8	40	31	1.290	34	
8	Messina	29	12	8	9	52	45	1.156	32	
9	Cagliari (R, E, R)	29	12	6	11	44	39	1.128	30	Phoenix in Sardinia L. (Note: The old CS Cagliari went bankrupt in summer 1935. A new US Cagliari was then re-founded in the Sardinian Championship which was won in 1937.)
10	Seregno (R)	29	9	10	10	42	41	1.024	28	Relegation to Serie C
11	Spezia (R)	29	10	4	15	37	41	0.902	24	Relegation to Serie C
12	Casale (R)	29	7	9	13	28	53	0.528	23	Relegation to Serie C
13	Legnano (Note: 1 point deducted.) (R)	29	9	4	16	30	51	0.588	21	Relegation to Serie C
14	Pro Patria (R)	29	4	8	17	23	46	0.500	15	Relegation to Serie C
15	Derthona (Note: 2 points deducted.) (R)	29	3	7	19	23	74	0.311	11	Relegation to Serie C
16	Pavia (D, R, E)	15	0	3	12	7	29	0.241	5	Bankruptcy (Note: Pavia retired after 20 days and only the matches played in the first half of the season were considered valid. A new provisional team from Pavia was later founded in 1936 and restored in Serie C in 1937. AC Pavia was finally fully restored in 1942.)

Source: Panini
(D) Disqualified; (E) Eliminated; (P) Promoted; (R) Relegated

=== Results ===
Home \ Away	CAG	CSL	CTN	DER	GEN	LEG	LUC	MES	NOV	PAV	PIS	PPA	SER	SPE	VIA	VIG
Cagliari		4–0	2–3	1–0	0–1	3–1	0–0	5–3	2–0	1-0	1–1	2–0	2–1	3–0	1–2	2–1
Casale	3–2		2–1	1–0	0–1	2–1	1–1	3–3	1–1		1–2	1–0	1–2	0–0	1–0	1–1
Catania	2–0	1–0		5–2	2–2	1–0	3–2	3–2	2–0	1–0	3–0	3–1	1–1	2–1	3–1	2–0
Derthona	0–2	2–2	1–2		0–1	2–2	1–0	0–2	3–1		1–2	1–1	1–1	0–2	1–1	2–2
Genova 1893	2–0	4–1	3–1	1–0		4–2	1–1	3–0	1–2	4–0	2–0	2–0	2–1	1–1	1–0	0–1
Legnano	0–2	2–0	0–0	1–0	0–2		1–1	2–1	1–2		1–0	2–1	2–1	2–1	1–1	4–2
Lucchese	2–0	2–1	1–2	1–0	1–1	3–0		4–2	0–3	1–0	1–0	2–0	0–0	2–0	3–0	3–2
Messina	0–0	2–1	3–0	3–0	3–1	2–0	1–1		3–2	2–0	4–4	3–0	2–1	2–0	2–1	2–2
Novara	1–0	6–1	3–0	4–0	0–0	2–0	1–0	1–1		2–1	2–2	5–1	5–0	3–1	3–1	3–2
Pavia	1–1	0–1	1-0	0–2		1–3	0-2	0-3			0–0	0–0		3–4		
Pisa	2–1	4–0	1–0	8–0	1–1	4–0	4–1	0–0	3–1			2–1	2–1	1–0	4–0	2–1
Pro Patria	1–3	1–1	1–1	5–1	0–2	2–0	0–1	3–2	1–1	5-3	0–2		1–0	0–1	0–0	1–2
Seregno	3–3	1–1	1–1	7–1	2–3	3–1	3–2	3–1	2–0	2–0	1–1	0–0		1–0	1–1	2–2
Spezia	4–1	0–0	2–0	1–1	1–2	4–0	0–1	2–0	2–4		3–0	3–0	2–0		0–1	0–2
Viareggio	1–1	3–1	1–0	9–1	1–0	3–1	2–1	2–0	1–0	4–0	1–0	2–1	0–1	2–1		1–0
Vigevanesi	4–0	6–0	2–0	6–0	2–0	1–0	2–2	1–1	1–2	2–1	6–0	1–1	3–0	7–1	3–1	

Updated to match(es) played on unknown. Source: Almanacco Illustrato del Calcio - La Storia 1898-2004, Panini Edizioni, Modena, September 2005 (in Italian)
Legend: Blue = home team win; Yellow = draw; Red = away team win.

== Group B ==
Serie B 1934-35 Girone B team distribution

=== Final classification ===
Pos	Team	Pld	W	D	L	GF	GA	GR	Pts	Promotion or relegation
1	Bari (P, C)	28	14	9	5	48	24	2.000	37	Promotion to Serie A
2	Modena	28	17	2	9	43	31	1.387	36	
3	Pistoiese	28	15	4	9	47	27	1.741	34	
4	L'Aquila	28	12	8	8	48	36	1.333	32	
4	Verona	28	12	8	8	36	32	1.125	32	
6	S.P.A.L.	28	13	5	10	45	42	1.071	31	
7	Atalanta	28	12	6	10	38	35	1.086	30	
8	Foggia	28	12	5	11	45	37	1.216	29	Relegation tie-breaker
8	Cremonese (R)	28	11	7	10	34	35	0.971	29	Serie C after tie-breaker
10	Padova (R)	28	10	7	11	45	35	1.286	27	Relegation to Serie C
11	Catanzarese (R)	28	9	4	15	33	41	0.805	22	Relegation to Serie C
11	Vicenza (R)	28	8	6	14	27	40	0.675	22	Relegation to Serie C
11	Venezia (R)	28	9	4	15	25	47	0.532	22	Relegation to Serie C
14	Comense (R)	28	7	6	15	27	55	0.491	20	Relegation to Serie C
15	Perugia (R, E, R)	28	6	5	17	25	49	0.510	17	Revival in First Division (Note: Perugia was unable to retain their professional status in summer 1935 and the FIGC disbanded the first team. The club continued in the Regional championships with its reserve amatorial team, and it was restored in Serie C in 1938.)
16	Grion Pola (Note: Grion Pola retired after 15 matches and all their matches were voided.) (D, R)	0	0	0	0	0	0	—	7	Relegation to Serie C

Source: Panini
(C) Champions; (D) Disqualified; (E) Eliminated; (P) Promoted; (R) Relegated

=== Results ===
Home \ Away	ATA	BAR	CTZ	COM	CRE	FOG	GRP	LAQ	MOD	PAD	PER	PST	SPA	VEN	HEL	VIC
Atalanta		0–2	2–0	1–1	1–5	2–1		1–1	1–2	1–1	2–1	0–1	1–1	6–0	1–0	2–0
Bari	0–0		3–1	3–1	2–0	1–1	2-0	4–0	3–0	3–1	2–0	3–0	3–0	2–0	1–1	5–0
Catanzarese	1–1	1–0		3–0	2–2	5–1	4-1	2–0	0–1	2–0	2–1	3–4	2–0	0–2	4–1	2–2
Comense	0–1	1–1	0–1		2–4	1–2	2-1	2–2	1–0	1–1	1–0	1–3	0–4	2–1	2–1	1–0
Cremonese	2–0	1–1	1–0	1–0		1–0	4-1	0–0	0–1	2–0	4–0	0–0	5–1	1–0	0–1	1–0
Foggia	2–0	3–1	2–0	2–2	4–1			2–3	3–0	1–0	3–1	1–0	5–1	0–1	1–1	5–0
Grion Pola	0-1					2-0		1-0	1-0	1-3		0-2		0-2		1-1
L'Aquila	0–1	1–1	4–0	5–1	0–0	3–1			1–0	2–1	5–1	1–0	3–1	0–1	3–2	2–0
Modena	4–3	4–0	4–0	2–1	3–0	1–0		2–1		1–0	1–0	1–0	3–1	5–0	0–0	1–0
Padova	2–1	0–1	1–1	6–0	5–0	3–1		4–2	3–0		3–1	1–0	2–2	3–0	1–1	1–0
Perugia	2–1	0–0	1–0	1–0	1–1	0–2	3-0	1–1	4–3	3–3		0–2	0–1	2–0	1–1	1–0
Pistoiese	0–2	3–1	1–0	7–2	6–0	3–0		2–2	2–0	2–0	2–0		0–3	1–0	3–0	4–2
SPAL	0–1	2–0	1–0	1–1	1–0	3–1	4-2	2–4	0–1	2–1	3–1	1–1		6–2	3–1	2–1
Venezia	3–1	0–2	2–1	0–1	0–0	1–1		1–1	1–1	3–1	2–0	1–0	1–2		1–2	2–1
Hellas Verona	1–2	1–1	3–0	0–2	3–2	0–0	3-0	1–0	3–2	1–0	2–1	2–0	1–0	4–0		1–0
Vicenza	2–3	2–2	1–0	2–0	1–0	2–0		2–1	3–0	1–1	2–1	0–0	1–1	1–0	1–1	

Updated to match(es) played on unknown. Source: Almanacco Illustrato del Calcio - La Storia 1898-2004, Panini Edizioni, Modena, September 2005 (in Italian)
Legend: Blue = home team win; Yellow = draw; Red = away team win.

=== Relegation tie-breaker ===
Played in Ancona on June 9

Team 1	Score	Team 2
Cremonese	1-1	Foggia

Played in Fano on June 16

Team 1	Score	Team 2
Cremonese	0-1	Foggia

U.S. Cremonese were relegated to Serie C.

== Championship play-off ==
Team 1	Agg.	Team 2	1st leg	2nd leg
Bari	1-4	Genova 1893	1-0	0-4

Genova 1893 were declared Serie B champions.

== References and sources ==
- Almanacco Illustrato del Calcio - La Storia 1898-2004, Panini Edizioni, Modena, September 2005
