= US Reno Molinella 1911 =

Italian football club

Molinella
- Full name: Unione Sportiva Reno Molinella 1911
- Founded: 1911
- Ground: Stadio Augusto Magli, Molinella, Italy
- Capacity: 3,700
- League: Prima Categoria - Emilia-Romagna
| Home colours | Away colours |

U.S. Reno Molinella 1911 is an Italian association football club located in Molinella, Emilia-Romagna. It currently plays in Prima Categoria. Its colors are red and blue.

The club was founded in 1911 and spend the 1939–40 season in Serie B.

Edoardo Reja started his career as a manager at Molinella.
