= 1984–85 Serie B =

Italian football league season

Serie B
- Season: 1984–85
- Champions: Pisa; 1st title

Serie B 1984-85 team distribution

The Serie B 1984–85 was the fifty-third tournament of this competition played in Italy since its creation.

== Teams ==
Parma, Bologna, Bari and Taranto had been promoted from Serie C, while Genoa, Pisa and Catania had been relegated from Serie A.

== Final classification ==
Pos	Team	Pld	W	D	L	GF	GA	GD	Pts	Promotion or relegation
1	Pisa (P, C)	38	17	16	5	52	27	+25	50	Promotion to Serie A
2	Lecce (P)	38	16	18	4	40	26	+14	50	Promotion to Serie A
3	Bari (P)	38	18	13	7	42	25	+17	49	Promotion to Serie A
4	Perugia	38	11	26	1	38	25	+13	48	
5	Triestina	38	16	15	7	39	27	+12	47	
6	Genoa	38	13	14	11	38	32	+6	40	
7	Pescara	38	12	14	12	38	35	+3	38	
8	Empoli	38	8	21	9	22	28	−6	37	
9	Bologna	38	9	18	11	25	31	−6	36	
9	Monza	38	10	16	12	26	28	−2	36	
9	Sambenedettese	38	9	18	11	27	29	−2	36	
9	Cesena	38	9	18	11	35	34	+1	36	
9	Campobasso	38	12	12	14	29	32	−3	36	
14	Catania	38	7	21	10	33	38	−5	35	
14	Arezzo	38	10	15	13	25	33	−8	35	
16	Cagliari	38	12	10	16	29	32	−3	34	
17	Varese (R)	38	9	15	14	37	42	−5	33	Relegation to Serie C1
18	Parma (R)	38	6	14	18	25	47	−22	26	Relegation to Serie C1
19	Taranto (R)	38	6	11	21	25	51	−26	23	Relegation to Serie C1
20	Padova (Note: Ranked last by the FIGC for fraud and corruption.) (D, R)	38	8	19	11	31	34	−3	35	Relegation to Serie C1

Source: head-to-head points used in event of equal points in relegation zone.
(C) Champions; (D) Disqualified; (P) Promoted; (R) Relegated

== Results ==
Home \ Away	ARE	BAR	BOL	CAG	CAM	CAT	CES	EMP	GEN	LEC	MON	PAD	PAR	PER	PES	PIS	SAM	TAR	TRI	VAR
Arezzo	—	0–0	0–0	0–2	1–0	1–0	1–1	1–0	0–0	0–0	1–1	2–0	3–2	0–0	2–0	0–1	1–0	2–1	1–2	1–1
Bari	2–1	—	4–0	1–0	2–1	2–1	2–1	0–0	1–0	2–0	1–0	2–2	2–0	1–1	2–0	1–1	1–0	1–0	1–0	2–1
Bologna	2–0	1–0	—	0–1	2–2	1–1	0–0	0–0	1–2	1–1	2–0	2–0	1–1	1–2	0–0	2–2	1–0	2–0	3–2	1–0
Cagliari	4–1	2–1	2–0	—	1–0	0–0	0–1	1–0	1–0	0–1	1–1	0–0	1–0	0–0	3–1	1–0	0–1	0–2	1–0	1–1
Campobasso	0–0	0–1	0–0	1–0	—	1–0	0–0	1–1	1–0	2–1	1–0	1–1	3–1	1–1	1–1	1–0	0–1	2–1	1–0	1–0
Catania	1–0	0–0	1–0	3–1	0–0	—	2–2	0–1	1–4	0–0	1–0	1–0	1–1	0–0	0–0	2–1	1–1	3–3	1–1	1–1
Cesena	1–2	0–2	0–0	1–1	3–0	1–1	—	1–1	3–1	0–0	0–1	1–0	2–0	2–2	1–1	2–2	1–0	4–2	2–0	0–0
Empoli	0–0	1–1	0–0	1–0	1–0	1–3	0–0	—	1–0	2–2	0–0	1–0	1–0	1–1	0–0	1–1	1–1	0–0	1–2	1–0
Genoa	0–0	1–0	0–0	1–0	2–0	0–0	2–2	1–1	—	2–0	1–0	0–0	1–1	1–1	2–0	2–1	3–2	3–0	0–1	1–0
Lecce	1–0	1–0	0–0	2–0	2–2	1–1	1–0	1–1	3–1	—	1–0	1–0	2–0	1–1	2–0	1–0	1–0	1–0	2–2	1–0
Monza	0–0	2–0	1–1	1–1	1–0	1–0	1–0	0–0	1–1	1–1	—	2–1	3–0	0–0	2–1	0–0	2–0	2–0	0–0	1–1
Padova	2–0	2–2	2–0	2–2	0–0	2–1	2–1	1–0	1–1	1–1	0–0	—	1–1	1–1	0–0	0–2	0–0	3–0	1–1	2–1
Parma	0–1	1–0	1–0	0–0	0–1	1–0	1–1	0–1	0–0	0–1	1–0	1–1	—	0–0	1–0	1–3	2–2	2–1	1–1	1–1
Perugia	0–0	1–1	0–0	2–1	2–1	2–2	0–0	0–0	1–1	0–0	2–0	2–0	2–1	—	2–0	1–1	1–1	3–1	0–0	1–0
Pescara	2–0	0–0	1–0	2–0	0–2	1–1	3–0	2–0	3–0	1–1	4–0	1–1	3–0	0–0	—	2–2	1–0	2–0	2–1	3–0
Pisa	1–1	0–0	4–0	1–0	1–0	1–1	1–0	2–0	1–0	3–1	1–1	1–0	1–1	4–1	2–0	—	1–0	2–1	1–1	4–0
Samb.	2–0	1–1	0–0	1–0	1–0	0–0	1–0	0–0	1–1	1–3	1–0	0–0	1–1	1–1	2–0	0–0	—	2–1	1–1	0–1
Taranto	1–1	0–0	0–0	1–0	1–0	0–0	0–1	1–1	0–2	1–1	1–0	1–2	2–1	0–1	0–0	1–2	0–0	—	0–1	1–1
Triestina	1–0	1–0	1–0	2–1	1–0	2–1	1–0	3–1	1–0	1–1	0–0	0–0	1–0	0–0	4–0	0–0	1–1	0–1	—	2–1
Varese	2–1	2–3	0–1	0–0	2–2	4–1	0–0	2–0	2–1	0–0	2–1	1–0	2–0	1–3	1–1	1–1	1–1	3–0	1–1	—

Legend: Blue = home team win; Yellow = draw; Red = away team win.

== Attendances ==
#	Club	Average
1	Bari	22,221
2	Cagliari	19,508
3	Bologna	15,567
4	Lecce	14,049
5	Pisa	13,569
6	Triestina	13,007
7	Padova	12,750
8	Perugia	12,557
9	Genoa	11,405
10	Catania	9,413
11	Pescara	8,606
12	Parma	8,414
13	Taranto	8,099
14	Campobasso	7,509
15	Cesena	7,423
16	Arezzo	6,842
17	Sambenedettese	5,740
18	Varese	4,479
19	Monza	4,387
20	Empoli	4,284

== References and sources ==
- Almanacco Illustrato del Calcio - La Storia 1898-2004, Panini Edizioni, Modena, September 2005

Specific
