= 1940–41 Serie B =

Italian football league season

Serie B
- Season: 1940–41
- Champions: Liguria; 2nd title

Serie B 1940-41 team distribution

The Serie B 1940–41 was the twelfth tournament of this competition played in Italy since its creation.

== Teams ==
Reggiana, Savona, Vicenza and Macerata had been promoted from Serie C, while Liguria and Modena had been relegated from Serie A. Additionally, Spezia was admitted from Serie C to fill a vacancy.

== Final classification ==
Pos	Team	Pld	W	D	L	GF	GA	GR	Pts	Promotion or relegation
1	Liguria (P, C)	34	22	5	7	71	32	2.219	49	Promotion to Serie A
2	Modena (P)	34	21	6	7	74	33	2.242	48	Promotion to Serie A
3	Brescia	34	20	6	8	67	32	2.094	46	
4	Savona	34	17	10	7	48	23	2.087	44	
5	Padova	34	15	9	10	64	47	1.362	39	
6	Vicenza	34	15	8	11	66	58	1.138	38	
7	Alessandria	34	12	11	11	58	54	1.074	35	
8	Siena	34	13	8	13	42	41	1.024	34	
9	Reggiana	34	12	9	13	51	43	1.186	33	
10	Lucchese	34	12	9	13	42	47	0.894	33	
11	Udinese	34	9	13	12	45	50	0.900	31	
12	Spezia	34	10	10	14	45	51	0.882	30	
13	Fanfulla	34	11	8	15	48	61	0.787	30	
14	Pisa	34	10	10	14	40	60	0.667	30	
15	Verona (R)	34	11	4	19	47	76	0.618	26	Relegation to Serie C
16	Anconitana (R)	34	9	7	18	44	74	0.595	25	Relegation to Serie C
17	Macerata (R)	34	9	3	22	35	78	0.449	21	Relegation to Serie C
18	Pro Vercelli (R)	34	6	8	20	42	69	0.609	20	Relegation to Serie C

Source: goal average officially used in event of equal points.
(C) Champions; (P) Promoted; (R) Relegated

== Results ==
Home \ Away	ALE	ANC	BRE	FAN	LIG	LUC	MAC	MOD	PAD	PIS	PVE	REA	SVN	SIE	SPE	UDI	HEL	VIC
Alessandria		2–0	1–0	4–0	1–3	1–2	4–2	1–1	3–2	3–3	3–0	1–1	2–2	1–1	1–1	1–2	5–1	1–1
Anconitana	1–1		2–4	3–3	3–4	5–2	1–0	1–4	0–2	1–1	1–1	2–1	0–0	1–0	3–1	2–1	1–0	3–1
Brescia	2–0	2–0		0–0	1–3	1–1	2–0	2–0	2–0	8–0	3–0	2–1	1–0	1–0	3–0	1–0	6–0	2–1
Fanfulla	4–0	5–2	1–2		1–0	1–1	1–0	1–5	1–3	1–1	0–2	2–1	2–2	1–0	2–1	1–1	5–1	2–5
Liguria	2–1	3–0	2–0	2–0		1–0	6–1	2–0	3–0	4–1	4–1	2–0	1–1	3–0	1–1	3–2	3–1	0–0
Lucchese	0–0	3–0	3–2	2–0	1–3		4–0	2–6	1–1	2–0	2–1	1–0	0–0	1–0	4–1	1–1	0–0	2–1
Macerata	0–5	1–3	1–1	2–0	2–1	2–1		1–0	1–3	3–1	2–1	4–0	0–1	0–2	1–3	5–3	2–1	2–4
Modena	4–2	5–0	2–0	1–0	3–2	2–0	4–0		0–0	1–0	5–1	3–1	1–0	3–1	1–0	2–0	6–1	3–1
Padova	1–2	3–1	0–0	3–3	0–0	6–1	2–0	2–2		2–0	4–1	2–1	0–0	3–1	3–0	1–2	3–1	6–1
Pisa	1–2	1–1	4–3	0–1	0–1	2–1	1–0	1–0	2–2		2–1	2–1	1–1	2–0	0–0	0–0	4–1	4–2
Pro Vercelli	1–2	0–0	0–4	0–4	2–3	0–0	6–1	2–1	3–0	2–2		1–1	2–2	0–2	4–0	3–1	0–1	1–1
Reggiana	1–0	4–1	1–1	2–0	1–2	2–1	4–0	3–3	2–0	3–0	3–1		3–0	4–1	0–0	3–3	2–0	2–1
Savona	3–0	4–0	2–1	3–0	1–0	1–1	3–0	0–1	3–1	2–0	1–0	0–0		2–0	1–0	2–0	2–1	5–0
Siena	4–0	4–2	2–1	3–1	1–0	2–1	0–0	1–1	0–2	0–0	2–0	0–0	1–0		2–1	4–1	2–3	2–1
Spezia	2–2	1–0	1–2	2–2	1–4	2–0	4–1	1–0	5–2	1–2	3–1	2–0	1–0	1–1		0–2	4–0	1–1
Udinese	0–1	4–1	1–2	3–0	0–0	1–0	1–1	0–0	0–0	6–2	1–1	2–2	0–1	1–1	1–0		2–2	0–0
Hellas Verona	2–2	3–1	1–3	1–2	3–2	0–1	2–0	3–1	3–1	2–0	4–3	2–1	1–2	2–1	2–2	1–2		1–2
Vicenza	4–3	3–2	2–2	3–1	2–1	2–0	3–0	1–3	2–4	2–0	4–0	1–0	2–1	1–1	2–2	6–1	3–0	

Updated to match(es) played on unknown. Source: Almanacco Illustrato del Calcio - La Storia 1898-2004, Panini Edizioni, Modena, September 2005 (in Italian)
Legend: Blue = home team win; Yellow = draw; Red = away team win.

== References and sources ==
- Almanacco Illustrato del Calcio - La Storia 1898-2004, Panini Edizioni, Modena, September 2005
