= 1966–67 Serie B =

Italian football league season

Serie B
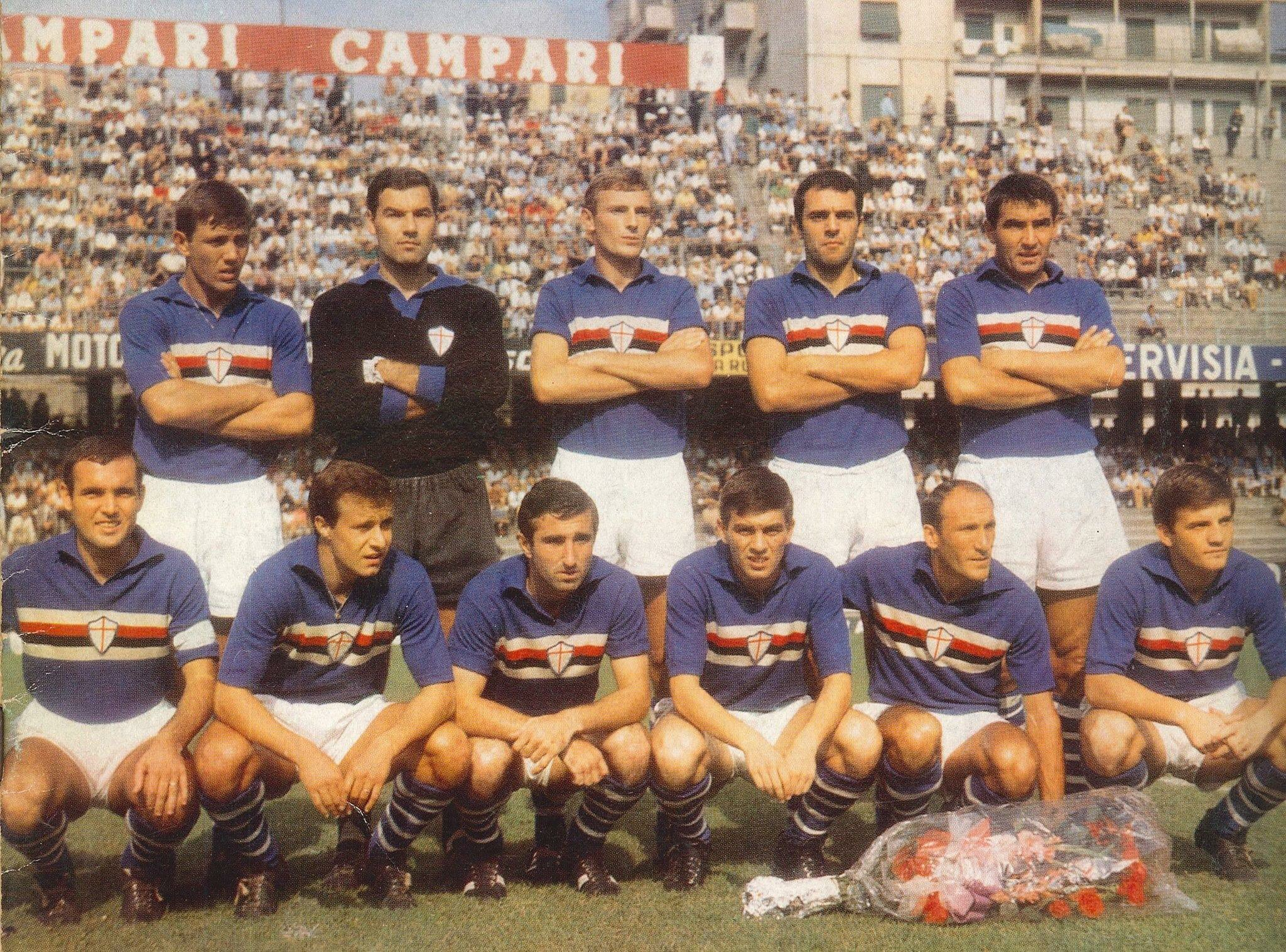
- 1966–67 Sampdoria squad
- Season: 1966–67
- Champions: Sampdoria; 3rd title

Serie B 1966-67 team distribution

The Serie B 1966–67 was the thirty-fifth tournament of this competition played in Italy since its creation.

== Teams ==
Savona, Arezzo and Salernitana had been promoted from Serie C, while Sampdoria, Catania and Varese had been relegated from Serie A.

The Genoa’s “derby” was played in Serie B for the first time.

== Events ==
Transitional promotions and relegations were imposed by the reduction of the Serie A.

== Final classification ==
Pos	Team	Pld	W	D	L	GF	GA	GR	Pts	Promotion or relegation
1	Sampdoria (P, C)	38	20	14	4	47	19	2.474	54	Promotion to Serie A
2	Varese (P)	38	19	13	6	44	21	2.095	51	Promotion to Serie A
3	Catanzaro	38	14	14	10	44	42	1.048	42	
3	Catania	38	15	12	11	35	31	1.129	42	
3	Reggiana	38	15	12	11	35	39	0.897	42	
6	Padova	38	11	17	10	37	33	1.121	39	
6	Modena	38	12	15	11	41	44	0.932	39	
6	Potenza	38	13	13	12	35	38	0.921	39	
9	Palermo	38	12	14	12	34	26	1.308	38	
9	Reggina	38	11	16	11	35	33	1.061	38	
11	Messina	38	11	15	12	36	40	0.900	37	
12	Genoa	38	12	12	14	39	33	1.182	36	
12	Verona	38	12	12	14	33	36	0.917	36	
12	Pisa	38	10	16	12	27	30	0.900	36	
12	Novara	38	13	10	15	31	35	0.886	36	
16	Livorno	38	12	11	15	32	39	0.821	35	
17	Savona (R)	38	12	10	16	44	46	0.957	34	Relegation to Serie C
18	Arezzo (R)	38	11	10	17	39	44	0.886	32	Relegation to Serie C
19	Alessandria (R)	38	8	13	17	35	48	0.729	29	Relegation to Serie C
20	Salernitana (R)	38	9	7	22	23	49	0.469	25	Relegation to Serie C

Source: Panini
(C) Champions; (P) Promoted; (R) Relegated

== Results ==
Home \ Away	ALE	ARE	CTN	CTZ	GEN	LIV	MES	MOD	NOV	PAD	PAL	PIS	POT	REA	REG	SAL	SAM	SVN	VAR	HEL
Alessandria		2–0	1–1	0–2	2–3	2–0	0–0	2–2	2–2	0–2	4–1	1–0	2–0	1–1	0–2	3–1	2–2	3–0	0–3	0–2
Arezzo	3–0		1–1	0–1	2–1	1–1	2–0	2–3	2–0	2–2	0–1	1–0	2–4	1–1	1–0	2–0	0–0	3–2	0–0	2–0
Catania	1–0	1–0		2–1	2–1	2–1	1–1	0–2	0–0	1–1	1–0	2–0	1–2	3–0	0–0	1–0	0–0	2–1	0–0	2–0
Catanzaro	3–1	1–0	2–1		1–1	1–1	2–0	1–1	2–0	1–1	0–0	1–0	2–2	1–0	1–1	3–0	0–0	3–0	2–1	3–1
Genoa	3–1	1–0	0–0	1–0		1–0	2–2	1–0	0–1	0–0	1–1	3–0	2–0	8–1	1–1	2–0	1–0	0–0	2–0	1–1
Livorno	1–0	2–1	1–3	4–1	1–0		4–1	0–0	0–0	1–0	2–1	2–0	1–1	1–2	2–1	1–0	0–1	1–0	0–0	0–1
Messina	2–0	0–0	0–0	2–2	2–0	3–1		0–2	2–0	1–1	0–0	1–1	4–1	0–0	2–0	2–0	1–3	0–0	1–1	1–0
Modena	1–1	1–0	1–3	0–0	1–0	2–2	2–1		1–0	0–1	0–0	2–2	1–0	0–0	0–0	1–0	1–0	2–2	2–2	3–1
Novara	0–0	1–0	1–0	0–1	3–1	3–1	2–0	1–2		2–0	1–0	0–0	1–1	3–0	3–2	2–0	0–2	1–0	0–2	2–0
Padova	1–1	1–1	0–1	1–1	1–0	0–0	0–1	2–1	2–0		1–0	1–1	1–1	2–0	6–0	1–1	2–2	2–2	0–2	2–1
Palermo	0–0	0–3	0–1	2–0	3–1	0–0	2–1	2–2	2–0	2–0		0–0	4–0	2–0	0–0	4–0	0–1	1–0	0–0	1–1
Pisa	0–0	2–0	2–0	5–1	1–0	1–0	0–0	1–0	1–0	1–0	0–0		1–1	0–1	0–0	0–0	2–3	1–0	0–1	2–1
Potenza	1–0	0–3	1–1	2–2	2–0	1–0	3–0	1–0	1–1	1–0	0–1	0–0		1–0	0–0	3–0	0–0	0–1	2–1	1–1
Reggiana	2–1	1–0	0–0	2–1	0–0	2–0	4–0	1–1	0–0	1–0	1–0	0–0	0–1		1–0	3–1	1–1	1–1	2–1	0–0
Reggina	2–0	5–0	1–0	1–1	0–0	1–0	2–1	1–1	1–0	3–0	0–2	2–2	0–0	1–0		0–0	1–1	2–1	1–1	2–0
Salernitana	1–2	1–0	3–0	2–0	1–0	0–0	0–2	3–2	0–0	0–1	1–0	1–0	0–1	1–2	1–0		2–2	3–2	0–2	0–1
Sampdoria	1–0	3–0	2–0	3–0	0–0	3–0	0–0	1–0	3–1	0–0	1–0	0–0	1–0	1–2	1–0	1–0		1–0	2–0	2–1
Savona	0–0	3–2	2–1	2–0	1–0	0–1	0–0	5–1	3–0	1–1	1–1	4–1	1–0	4–2	0–0	1–0	2–1		0–1	0–1
Varese	1–0	1–1	1–0	2–0	1–1	1–0	2–0	3–0	0–0	0–1	2–1	0–0	2–0	1–0	2–1	2–0	0–0	2–1		3–1
Hellas Verona	1–1	1–1	2–0	0–0	1–0	3–0	0–2	2–0	1–0	0–0	0–0	1–0	1–0	0–1	2–1	0–0	0–2	5–1	0–0	

Source: Almanacco Illustrato del Calcio - La Storia 1898-2004, Panini Edizioni, Modena, September 2005 (in Italian)
Legend: Blue = home team win; Yellow = draw; Red = away team win.

== Attendances ==
#	Club	Average
1	Genoa	11,340
2	Sampdoria	10,720
3	Livorno	9,643
4	Palermo	9,578
5	Reggina	9,274
6	Modena	8,371
7	Catania	7,772
8	Salernitana	7,567
9	Padova	7,373
10	Hellas	6,905
11	Pisa	6,690
12	Varese	6,651
13	Alessandria	6,531
14	Savona	6,427
15	Reggiana	6,007
16	Novara	5,569
17	Messina	5,395
18	Arezzo	5,071
19	Catanzaro	4,451
20	Potenza	3,456

== References and sources ==
- Almanacco Illustrato del Calcio - La Storia 1898-2004, Panini Edizioni, Modena, September 2005

Specific
