= 1953–54 Serie B =

Italian football league season

Serie B
- Season: 1953–54
- Champions: Catania; 1st title

Serie B 1953-54 team distribution

The Serie B 1953–54 was the twenty-second tournament of this competition played in Italy since its creation.

== Teams ==
Pavia and Alessandria had been promoted from Serie C, while Como and Pro Patria had been relegated from Serie A.

== Final classification ==
Pos	Team	Pld	W	D	L	GF	GA	GR	Pts	Promotion or relegation
1	Catania (P, C)	34	16	11	7	54	31	1.742	43	Promotion to Serie A
2	Pro Patria (P)	34	15	11	8	49	36	1.361	41	Serie A after tie-breaker
3	Cagliari	34	16	9	9	42	30	1.400	41	Promotion tie-breaker
4	Como	34	14	12	8	37	22	1.682	40	
5	Marzotto	34	15	9	10	39	30	1.300	39	
6	Lanerossi Vicenza	34	13	11	10	41	34	1.206	37	
7	Verona	34	12	12	10	44	37	1.189	36	
7	Monza	34	10	16	8	30	29	1.034	36	
9	Brescia	34	11	11	12	33	38	0.868	33	
10	Modena	34	9	12	13	35	37	0.946	30	
10	Messina	34	9	12	13	23	27	0.852	30	
10	Salernitana	34	10	10	14	31	46	0.674	30	
13	Padova	34	9	11	14	33	40	0.825	29	
13	Alessandria	34	9	11	14	39	50	0.780	29	
13	Pavia	34	9	11	14	39	51	0.765	29	
13	Treviso	34	7	15	12	24	41	0.585	29	
17	Fanfulla (Note: 5 points deducted for an attempted corruption.) (D, R)	34	11	11	12	37	34	1.088	28	Relegation to Serie C
18	Piombino (R)	34	8	11	15	24	41	0.585	27	Relegation to Serie C

Source: Panini
(C) Champions; (D) Disqualified; (P) Promoted; (R) Relegated

== Results ==
Home \ Away	ALE	BRE	CAG	CTN	COM	FAN	LRV	MAR	MES	MOD	MON	PAD	PAV	PIO	PPA	SAL	TRV	HEL
Alessandria		1–1	1–1	1–1	2–1	2–1	0–2	0–2	2–1	4–2	1–0	1–1	2–1	5–0	0–0	2–1	3–2	2–3
Brescia	1–1		1–0	0–2	2–0	4–2	2–0	1–0	1–0	1–1	1–1	2–0	2–0	0–0	1–1	0–1	2–0	1–2
Cagliari	1–0	2–0		3–1	3–2	0–0	1–0	3–0	1–0	3–1	1–0	3–0	1–1	2–0	3–0	2–0	1–1	1–0
Catania	4–0	4–1	3–1		1–1	0–1	2–1	3–0	1–3	1–0	2–2	1–1	0–0	3–0	2–0	0–0	3–1	3–1
Como	0–0	2–0	0–0	0–0		2–0	2–2	1–0	1–0	2–0	4–1	4–0	2–0	2–0	1–2	1–1	1–0	1–0
Fanfulla	2–1	1–2	1–0	2–3	1–2		3–1	1–2	0–1	0–2	2–1	2–0	4–0	3–0	2–0	0–0	0–0	1–1
L.R. Vicenza	1–0	2–1	4–1	1–2	1–1	2–2		0–0	2–0	2–2	1–1	1–0	3–1	2–0	0–2	3–0	1–1	0–0
Marzotto	3–2	0–0	1–1	1–0	0–1	0–0	3–0		3–0	0–0	1–1	1–0	4–1	2–1	2–0	3–1	4–0	1–0
Messina	1–1	1–1	3–1	0–1	1–0	0–1	0–1	2–0		0–0	0–0	0–1	1–0	0–0	1–1	1–0	1–0	2–0
Modena	3–0	1–2	1–1	1–0	0–0	0–2	2–1	0–1	0–0		2–0	1–1	2–2	0–1	2–1	2–0	0–0	4–1
Monza	0–0	3–0	1–0	1–1	0–0	0–0	0–0	0–0	2–0	2–2		0–0	1–0	2–1	2–2	3–0	1–0	1–0
Padova	1–0	3–0	1–1	1–1	1–0	2–2	0–1	2–0	0–0	0–0	2–3		5–2	2–0	2–2	2–0	2–0	0–1
Pavia	2–0	1–1	0–0	1–1	0–1	1–0	0–1	0–1	3–2	3–2	1–0	2–1		1–1	2–2	3–0	5–1	1–1
Piombino	2–0	1–1	2–1	1–2	1–0	0–0	0–2	4–1	0–0	1–0	0–0	1–0	0–0		0–1	5–3	1–1	1–1
Pro Patria	3–2	2–0	3–0	1–1	1–0	2–0	1–0	2–1	1–0	2–0	0–1	3–0	2–3	0–0		3–3	1–1	1–1
Salernitana	1–1	2–1	0–1	0–3	1–1	0–0	2–1	1–0	1–1	1–2	0–0	2–1	1–0	2–0	1–0		2–0	1–0
Treviso	1–1	1–0	0–1	3–2	0–0	0–0	0–0	1–1	0–0	1–0	1–0	1–1	1–1	1–0	2–5	1–0		0–0
Hellas Verona	4–1	0–0	2–1	1–0	1–1	3–1	2–2	1–1	1–1	1–0	4–0	2–0	5–1	1–0	0–2	3–3	1–2	

Source: Almanacco Illustrato del Calcio - La Storia 1898-2004, Panini Edizioni, Modena, September 2005 (in Italian)
Legend: Blue = home team win; Yellow = draw; Red = away team win.

== Promotion tie-breaker ==
Team 1	Score	Team 2
Cagliari (Italy)	0-2	(Italy) Pro Patria

Pro Patria promoted to Serie A.

== References and sources ==
- Almanacco Illustrato del Calcio - La Storia 1898-2004, Panini Edizioni, Modena, September 2005
