= Serie B =

Italian association football league

- Organising body: Lega B
- Founded: 1929; 97 years ago (pilot in 1922)
- Country: Italy
- Confederation: UEFA
- Number of clubs: 20
- Level on pyramid: 2
- Promotion to: Serie A
- Relegation to: Serie C
- Domestic cup: Coppa Italia
- Current champions: Venezia (3rd title) (2025–26)
- Most championships: Genoa (6); Atalanta (6)
- Most appearances: Luigi Cagni (483)
- Top scorer: Massimo Coda (144)
- Broadcasters: LaB Channel; DAZN
- Sponsor: Balkrishna Industries
- Website: www.legab.it
- Current: 2026–27 Serie B

The Serie B (Italian pronunciation: [ˈsɛːrje (b)ˈbi]), officially known as Serie BKT for sponsorship reasons, is the second-highest division in the Italian football league system after Serie A. It has been operating for over ninety years since the 1929–30 season. It had been organized by Lega Calcio until 2010 and the Lega B ever since. Common nicknames for the league are campionato cadetto and cadetteria, since cadetto is the Italian name for junior or cadet.

== History ==
The first Italian football championships were composed of a small number of teams. It was in 1904 that the tournament expanded with the first edition of the Seconda Categoria (Second Category): this was a competition in which, on one side, the reserve teams of clubs affiliated with the Prima Categoria (First Category) participated, and on the other side, those provincial clubs that had recently joined the Italian Football Federation (FIGC).

For the provincial teams, it wasn't enough to beat the reserve teams of the metropolitan clubs by winning the second-tier championship: they had to prove to a Federal Technical Commission that they had acquired a sufficient level of technical ability to compete with the first-team players of the Prima Categoria. Therefore, they were required to demonstrate this in a unique test match, not comparable to a play-off, a match against a Prima Categoria team in front of prominent football figures of the time. The first team to reach the honour, was Pro Vercelli in 1907, which even won the scudetto in 1908.

The status quo was challenged by a federal official with a letter published in the football columns of La Gazzetta dello Sport in February 1912: according to him, there was no movement between the Prima Categoria and the Seconda Categoria, which had to bear the expenses of an entire season only to see them wasted by a single match against the reserve teams of the larger clubs. The official proposed the introduction of a promotion-relegation system, which immediately gained the support of many clubs. As a result, several proposals for changes to the current Championship Regulations were drawn up in preparation for the annual Federal Assembly. This mechanism was introduced by the Federal Assembly on 31 August 1912, when the Valvassori-Faroppa plan was approved. This plan modified the Italian football pyramid, turning the Seconda Categoria into the new Promozione (Promotion) championship and creating a dedicated championship for Reserve teams. Just as the Seconda Categoria had been managed in the past, the Promozione was entrusted to the Regional Committees, which the FIGC had established in 1909.

It wasn’t until 1921 that the Pozzo Plan, made by manager Vittorio Pozzo, created a true national second-tier league by establishing the Seconda Divisione (Second Division), a tournament in which all the clubs affected by the heavy trimming of the Prima Categoria, now renamed Prima Divisione (First Division), participated. The new introduced regulations, strongly supported by the secessionist Italian Football Confederation (CCI) (which applied them starting in the 1921–22 season) and approved along with the Pozzo Plan, involved the division of Italy into two large geographical areas, managed by the North and South Leagues, with a sharp cut at the center of the country. This meant teams from Tuscany played in the North, and those from Marche and Umbria played in the South. As a result, the Seconda Divisione experienced two different sets of rules, due to the stark geographical and organizational differences: in the North, the league was organized outside the regional framework directly by the Lega Nord, while in the South, it was still managed by the Regional Committees because the distances and means of transportation didn’t allow for interregional league management. Only in the 1925–26 season did the Lega Sud of major clubs organized the regional Seconda Divisione groups directly. The first teams to be relegated (1921-22 season) were Vicenza and Inter Milan even if, after the CCI reunion with FIGC, the regulations were changed, and Venezia was demoted instead of the Milanese club.

In the north, the new competition started in the 1922–23 season with 48 teams divided into six groups, structured at the interregional level but still vaguely corresponding to the jurisdictions of the regional committees. By 1924–25, the number dropped to 40 teams and four groups, now geographically more extensive. In the south, not all Regional Committees managed to organize the Seconda Divisione championship immediately, which was especially difficult in the island regions, where the number of regulation-sized fields was minimal. The first season saw about 25 teams participating, and by the following season, this increased to 40, but problems related to the particularly troubled political era began to emerge. Few clubs managed to complete all four championships organized by the Lega Sud between 1922–23 and 1925–26 due to high operating costs.

In 1926, the Viareggio Charter renamed the top league to Divisione Nazionale (National Division), consequently renaming the lower categories, with the Seconda Divisione becoming the Prima Divisione. The two bodies managing the tournament, the Lega Nord and Lega Sud, were merged into a national governing body called the Direttorio Divisioni Superiori (Directory of Higher Divisions). This led to one of the groups being reserved for southern clubs, with many northern teams effectively relegated by default.

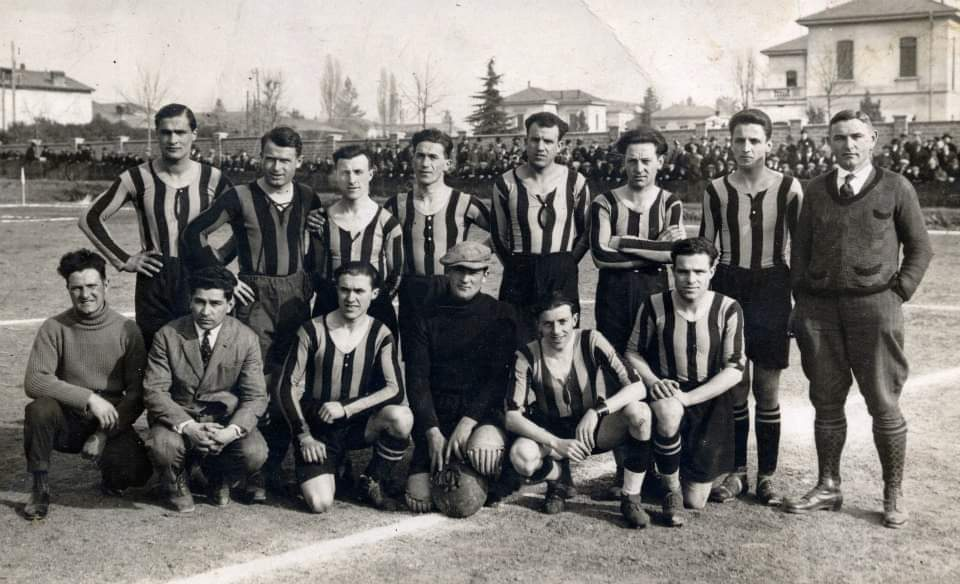
Atalanta, winners of the 1927–28 Prima Divisione, the predecessor of the Serie B with a single league format. The Lombard club holds the record with 6 first-place finishes in the second-tier league.

The far-reaching reform envisioned by the Viareggio Charter was completed in 1928 by the new FIGC president, the fascist politician from Bologna, Leandro Arpinati. The influential politician established the creation of a radically different second-tier league within a year, meaning no longer an interregional tournament but a single national group, exactly like the one planned for the top league. Thus, in 1929, the Serie B of the Divisione Nazionale was born. The establishment of a single group for the second-tier league sparked protests from smaller clubs, who complained about the high travel costs for matches across the entire country and the lower gate receipts compared to the top league. They unsuccessfully proposed expanding the first edition of Serie B of the Divisione Nazionale to two groups based on territorial criteria, admitting the semifinalists of the southern Prima Divisione championship by default. The two-group formula would have reduced the high operating costs of participating in the second-tier league and given more representation to the central and southern teams. However, the proposal was not accepted, and Serie B remained a single group.

The first edition saw 18 teams registered, a format that remained unchanged until the 1933–34 season, when an attempt was made to divide into two groups based on geography (west and east). However, this experiment was unsuccessful, and in 1935–36, the original model was reinstated, which, except for an attempt to reduce the number of teams between 1936 and 1938, continued until the break caused by World War II.

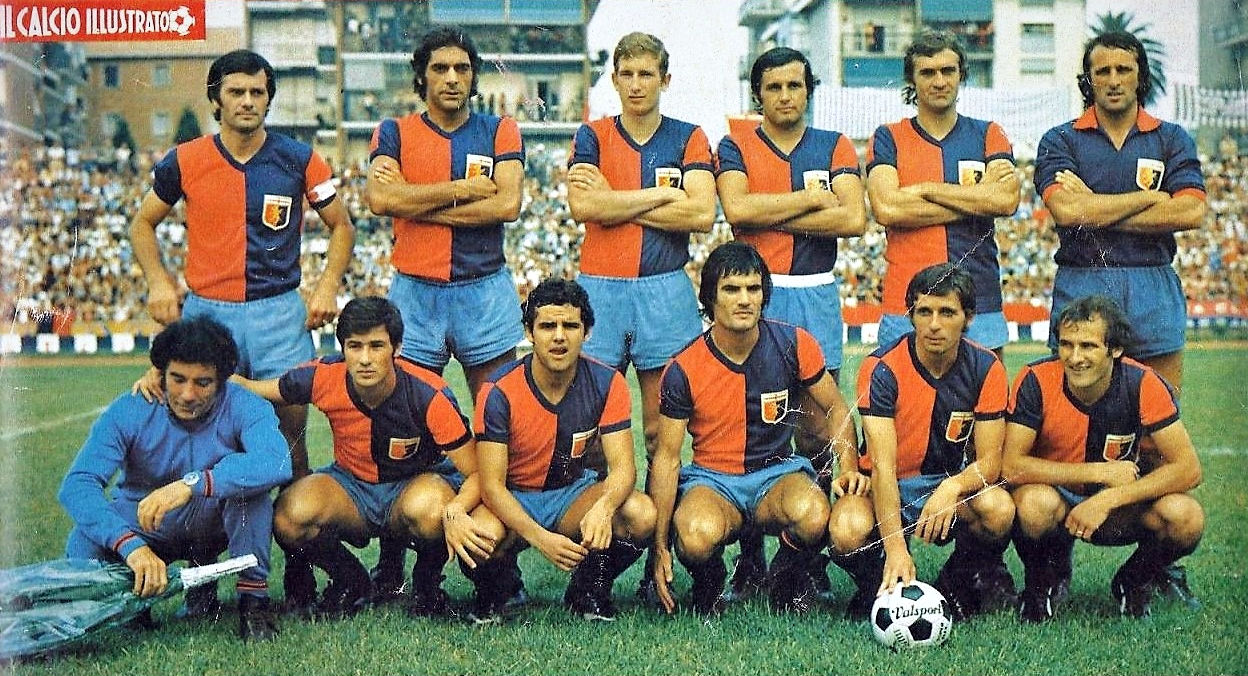
Genoa, winners of the 1972–73 Serie B; with 6 total victories, the Ligurian club shares the record for most wins in the second tier with Atalanta.

In the immediate post-war years, the colossal wartime destruction and widespread poverty made it impossible to immediately restart the competition. The tournament developed with different formats between the two areas of the country, north and south. In the 1946–47 and 1947–48 seasons, the Serie B was played with a three-group format (geographically divided into northwest, northeast, and central-south). In the 1948–49 season, the FIGC finally managed to recreate a single group with 22 teams, reduced again to 18 teams in the 1952–53 season. In the 1958–59 season, the league was expanded to 20 teams, a format that, except for one occasion (the 1967–68 season, with 21 teams due to the reduction from 18 to 16 Serie A teams), remained unchanged for 35 years.

It was the consequences of the so-called "Caso Catania" in the 2003–04 season that disrupted this consolidated tradition and brought the number of participating teams to a record high of 24, later reduced to 22 the following year.

From 1946, both Serie A and Serie B were run by Lega Calcio. However, on 30 April 2009, after divisions between Serie A and Serie B clubs regarding the future of the league, 19 of 20 top-flight clubs (the only exception being Lecce) agreed on plans to split from Serie B to form another governing and financing body. Subsequently, on 1 July 2010, the Lega Calcio has officially ceased to exist and was replaced by the two newly formed leagues, Lega Serie A and Lega Serie B.

In the 2018–19 season, due to the bankruptcy of Avellino, Bari, and Cesena to register, and the inability to quickly relegate teams (by the deadline for presenting the 2018–19 season fixtures), the second-tier league once again had an odd number of teams, dropping from 22 to 19. By FIGC order, in the 2019–20 season, the league returned to having 20 teams, a format that had been in place from 1968 to 2003.

The second-tier league, following the example of the top division, introduced the VAR system: from 2018 to 2021, it was used only for the play-offs and play-outs, while starting from the 2021–22 season, it was implemented for the entire regular season.

Serie B is the lowest division in which five historic clubs have ever played: Torino, Juventus, Milan, Roma and Lazio.

== Competition format ==
=== League ===
The single group format established in the 1929–30 season is identical to the Serie A (the immediately higher category): a round-robin group with home and away matches between the twenty participating teams for 38 games. Three points are awarded to the winner of the match since 1994 (previously two), one point each for a draw, and no points for the losing team. The regulations provide for three promotions to the top tier, against four relegations to Serie C. The top two teams are automatically promoted; the last promotion is instead decided through the playoffs, in which teams ranked from 3rd to 8th place participate, unless there is a gap of more than 14 points between the 3rd and 4th place teams: in this case, the playoffs will not be played, and the 3rd place team will be promoted directly to Serie A. Conversely, the teams ranked 18th to 20th are directly relegated; the last relegation is decided by a play-out between the 16th and 17th placed teams, unless the 17th place is more than 5 points behind the 16th place: in this case, the play-out will not be played, and the 17th place team will be directly relegated to Serie C. Starting from the 2005-06 season, the "head-to-head" ranking is used to determine the final classification in the event of a tie.

Since the 2006–07 season, Serie B introduced an on-field award ceremony for the first-place team, which is presented with a dedicated trophy. Until the 2019–20 season, the winning team of the tournament received the Ali della Vittoria (Wings of Victory) cup. After an interim season, starting from the 2021–22 season, the new "Nexus Cup" was introduced; a smaller version of this cup is also awarded to the second-place team and the winner of the playoffs.

Below is a complete record of how many teams played in each season throughout the league's history:

- 18 clubs: 1929–1933
- 26 clubs (in two groups): 1933–1934
- 32 clubs (in two groups): 1934–1935
- 18 clubs: 1935–1936
- 16 clubs: 1936–1937
- 17 clubs: 1937–1938
- 18 clubs: 1938–1943
- 60 clubs (in three groups): 1946–1947
- 54 clubs (in three groups): 1947–1948
- 22 clubs: 1948–1950
- 21 clubs: 1950–1951
- 22 clubs: 1951–1952
- 18 clubs: 1952–1958
- 20 clubs: 1958–1967
- 21 clubs: 1967–1968
- 20 clubs: 1968–2003
- 24 clubs: 2003–2004
- 22 clubs: 2004–2018
- 19 clubs: 2018–2019
- 20 clubs: 2019–present

=== Promotion and relegation ===
==== Play-offs ====
Play-offs were introduced in Serie B in the 2004–05 season to determine the third team promoted to Serie A.

The original formula provided for the participation of four teams (from 3rd to 6th place) who faced each other in semifinals and finals (both based on home and away matches). If the gap between the 3rd and 4th place teams was greater than nine points, the third-place team would be directly promoted to Serie A; otherwise, the play-offs would take place. In the 2012–13 season, there was a change in the final regulation: extra time was abolished in the away leg if the score was tied after 180 minutes.

Starting in the 2013–2014 season, the play-off bracket was expanded to include a maximum of six teams (from 3rd to 8th place), which had to be within a fourteen-point margin. As a result, the number of clubs participating in the promotion play-offs could vary, and thus the structure of the tournament changed depending on how many teams were involved. The third-place team would still be directly promoted if it had a gap of more than 9 points from the fourth place. From the 2017–2018 season onwards, the point difference between the 3rd and 4th place teams must not exceed fourteen points (instead of nine). The format is still variable based on the number of participating teams on the 14-point margin.

The current format is as follows:

- If only two teams, single round: 3 plays 4.
- If three teams, two rounds: 4 plays 5 in semifinal; semifinal winner plays 3.
- If four teams, two rounds: 3 plays 6 and 4 plays 5 in semifinals; semifinal winners play each other.
- If five teams, three rounds: 6 plays 7 in opening round; 3 plays 6/7 and 4 plays 5 in semifinals; semifinal winners play each other.
- If six teams, three rounds: the teams ranked from 5th to 8th place enter the preliminary round: 5th place faces 8th, and 6th faces 7th. There is only one match at the home of the higher-ranked team at the end of the season. The teams ranked 3rd and 4th place automatically advance to the semifinals, along with the 2 winners from the preliminary round. The 3rd place team faces the winner of the match between 6th and 7th place from the preliminary round.
- The final consists of one home and one away match. If there is an overall tie after 180 minutes, the team better placed in the regular season is promoted to Serie A. Only if both teams finished the season with the same number of points, starting from the 2015–2016 season, extra time and possibly penalty kicks are played. In both the semifinals and the final, the away goals rule is not applied.

Semifinals and finals are two-legged ties, with the higher-ranked team host second leg while opening round matches (if any) are single legs hosted by the higher-ranked team. If a preliminary round game ends in a draw, extra time is played. If still tied after 120 minutes, the higher-ranked team in the regular season advances to the semifinals. In the semifinals, if a game is tied after 90 minutes in the return leg, the team better placed in the regular season advances to the final. The same applies for the final except only if both teams finished the season with the same number of points, starting from the 2015–2016 season, extra time and possibly penalty kicks are played. In both the semifinals and the final, the away goals rule is not applied.

==== Play-out ====
Play-outs were introduced in the 2003–04 season to determine the fourth team relegated to Serie C: the bottom three teams are directly relegated, followed by the fourth-to-last team if the gap from the fifth-to-last team exceeds four points (5 points in the 2003–04 season). Otherwise, the play-out takes place with a home and away match: in the event of a draw in the final score, the fifth-to-last placed team at the end of the season retains its place in Serie B. Only if the two teams have finished the season with the same points in the standings, starting from the 2015–16 season, the away match includes extra time and possibly penalty kicks. Just like in the play-offs, the away goals rule does not apply in the play-out.

== Clubs ==
=== Current members ===
Locations of the 2025–26 Serie B teams

Team	Home city	Stadium	Capacity	2024–25 season
Avellino	Avellino	Stadio Partenio-Adriano Lombardi	26,000	Serie C, Group C winner
Bari	Bari	Stadio Comunale San Nicola	58,270	9th in Serie B
Carrarese	Carrara	Stadio dei Marmi - IV Olimpionici Azzurri	4,194	12th in Serie B
Catanzaro	Catanzaro	Stadio Nicola Ceravolo	14,650	6th in Serie B
Cesena	Cesena	Orogel Stadium - Dino Manuzzi	20,194	7th in Serie B
Empoli	Empoli	Stadio Carlo Castellani – Computer Gross Arena	16,284	18th in Serie A
Frosinone	Frosinone	Stadio Benito Stirpe	16,227	15th in Serie B
Juve Stabia	Castellammare di Stabia	Stadio Comunale Romeo Menti	7,642	5th in Serie B
Mantova	Mantua	Stadio Danilo Martelli – Pata Stadium	14,884	13th in Serie B
Modena	Modena	Stadio Alberto Braglia	21,151	11th in Serie B
Monza	Monza	U-Power Stadium	17,102	20th in Serie A
Padova	Padua	Stadio Comunale Euganeo	32,420	Serie C, Group A winner
Palermo	Palermo	Stadio Renzo Barbera	36,365	8th in Serie B
Pescara	Pescara	Stadio Adriatico – Giovanni Cornacchia	20,476	Serie C, play-off winner
Reggiana	Reggio Emilia	MAPEI Stadium - Città del Tricolore	21,525	14th in Serie B
Sampdoria	Genoa	Stadio Comunale Luigi Ferraris	33,205	17th in Serie B
Spezia	La Spezia	Stadio Alberto Picco	12,273	3rd in Serie B
Südtirol	Bolzano	Stadio Marco Druso	5,539	10th in Serie B
Venezia	Venice	Stadio Pier Luigi Penzo	12,048	19th in Serie A
Virtus Entella	Chiavari	Stadio Enrico Sannazzari	5,587	Serie C, Group B winner

=== Seasons in Serie B ===
This is the complete list of the 144 clubs that have taken part in the 95 Serie B seasons played from the 1929–30 season until the 2026–27 season. (Note: The championship was suspended from 1943 to 1945 due to WWII, and the 1945–46 northern edition is not statistically considered by FIGC, even if its promotion result was official.)

The teams in bold compete in Serie B in the 2026–27 season. The teams in italics represent defunct teams. The year in parentheses represents the most recent year of participation at this level.

- **66** seasons: Brescia (2025)
- **55** seasons: **Modena** (2027)
- **54** seasons: **Hellas Verona** (2027)
- **50** seasons: Bari (2026)
- **49** seasons: **Palermo** (2027)
- **41** seasons: Monza (2026)
- **40** seasons: Pescara (2026), Venezia (2026), **Padova** (2027)
- **39** seasons: **Pisa** (2027)
- **38** seasons: **Vicenza** (2027)
- **37** seasons: Como (2024), Reggiana (2026)
- **35** seasons: **Cesena** (2027) (Note: Includes 32 seasons competed as AC Cesena.)
- **34** seasons: Catania (2015), Novara (2018), Genoa (2023), **Cremonese** (2027)
- **32** seasons: Messina (2008), **Catanzaro** (2027)
- **31** seasons: Taranto (1993), Salernitana (2025)
- **30** seasons: Cagliari (2023), Parma (2024), Ternana (2024), Spezia (2026)
- **29** seasons: Lecce (2022), Perugia (2023)
- **28** seasons: Atalanta (2011), **Ascoli** (2027)
- **27** seasons: Livorno (2020)
- **26** seasons: Cosenza (2025) (Note: Includes 19 seasons competed as Cosenza Calcio 1914.)
- **25** seasons: Foggia (2019), Reggina (2023)
- **24** seasons: Ars et Labor Ferrara (2023), **Empoli** (2027)
- **22** seasons: Triestina (2011)
- **21** seasons: Sambenedettese (1989), Ancona (2010), Varese (2015), Alessandria (2022), **Avellino** (2027)
- **19** seasons: Lucchese (1999), Pistoiese (2002)
- **18** seasons: Udinese (1995), Piacenza (2011), Cittadella (2025)
- **17** seasons: **Arezzo** (2027), **Mantova** (2027)
- **16** seasons: Treviso (2009)
- **15** seasons: Crotone (2022), **Sampdoria** (2027) (Note: Pursuant to the Federal Internal Organizational Rules of the Italian Football Federation (NOIF, art. 20, subsection 5), Unione Calcio Sampdoria inherits and continues the sporting tradition of its most valuable ancestors, A.C. Sampierdarenese and A.C. La Dominante, which spent 3 and 2 seasons in Serie B respectively, for a total of 20 appearances. However, Sampdoria, Sampierdarenese and La Dominante are treated as separate clubs in history and statistics.)
- **14** seasons: Legnano (1957), Frosinone (2026)
- **13** seasons: Pro Patria (1966), Siena (2014), Pro Vercelli (2018)
- **12** seasons: Fanfulla (1954), Napoli (2007), Torino (2012), Bologna (2015), Lecco (2024)
- **11** seasons: Vigevano (1959), Lazio (1988)
- **10** seasons: Valdagno (1961), Prato (1964), ChievoVerona (2021)
- **9** seasons: Rimini (2009), AlbinoLeffe (2012)
- **8** seasons: **Juve Stabia** (2027), **Virtus Entella** (2027)
- **7** seasons: Siracusa (1953), Ravenna (2008)
- **6** seasons: Viareggio (1948), Seregno (1951), Brindisi (1976), Fidelis Andria (1999), Grosseto (2013), Sassuolo (2025), **Benevento** (2027)
- **5** seasons: Savona (1967), Potenza (1968), Campobasso (1987), Fiorentina (2004), Carpi (2019), Trapani (2020), **Carrarese** (2027), **Südtirol** (2027)
- **4** seasons: Monfalcone (1933), Casale (1947), Pro Sesto (1950), Pavia (1955), Barletta (1991), Virtus Lanciano (2016), Latina (2017)
- **3** seasons: Derthona (1935), Grion Pola (1935), L'Aquila (1937), Sanremese (1940), Sampierdarenese (1941), Piombino (1954), Cavese (1984), Savoia (2000), Nocerina (2012), Pordenone (2022)
- **2** seasons: La Dominante (1931), Fiumana (1942), Biellese (1947), Crema (1948), Gallaratese (1948), Pro Gorizia (1948), Rieti (1948), Scafatese (1948), Suzzara (1948), Vogherese (1948), Trani (1966), AC Milan (1983), Licata (1990), Casertana (1992), Acireale (1995), Castel di Sangro (1998), Gubbio (2012)
- **1** season: Molinella (1940), Maceratese (1941), M.A.T.E.R. (1943), Alba Trastevere (1947), Arsenale Taranto (1947), Forlì (1947), Mestre (1947), Sestrese (1947), Bolzano (1948), Centese (1948), Magenta (1948), Ponte San Pietro (1948), Roma (1952), Massese (1971), Sorrento (1972), Matera (1980), Alzano Virescit (2000), Fermana (2000), Juventus (2007), Gallipoli (2010), Portogruaro (2011), Feralpisalò (2024)

=== The Serie B–C Alta Italia post-war championship ===
This championship was organized by geographical criteria with only Northern Italy Serie B and the best Northern Italy Serie C teams taking part. Southern Italy Serie B teams took part to 1945–46 Serie A. For this reason, this championship is not included in the statistics.

- Alessandria – Alessandria
- Ausonia Spezia – La Spezia
- Biellese – Biella
- Casale – Casale Monferrato
- Cesena – Cesena
- Como – Como
- Crema – Crema
- Cremonese – Cremona
- Cuneo – Cuneo
- Fanfulla – Lodi
- Forlì – Forlì
- Gallaratese – Gallarate
- Lecco – Lecco
- Legnano – Legnano
- Mantova – Mantua
- Novara – Novara
- Padova – Padua
- Panigale – Bologna
- Parma – Parma
- Piacenza – Piacenza
- Pro Gorizia – Gorizia
- Pro Patria – Busto Arsizio
- Pro Sesto – Sesto San Giovanni
- Pro Vercelli – Vercelli
- Reggiana – Reggio Emilia
- Savona – Savona
- Seregno – Seregno
- Sestrese – Genoa
- SPAL – Ferrara
- Suzzara – Suzzara
- Trento – Trento
- Treviso – Treviso
- Udinese – Udine
- Verona – Verona
- Vigevano – Vigevano
- Vogherese – Voghera

== Champions and promotions ==
Note: a cadet title had already been awarded by the DDS’s First Division to Novara in 1927 and to Atalanta in 1928.

Season	Champions	Runners-up	Other promoted
1929–30	Casale	Legnano	
1930–31	Fiorentina	Bari	
1931–32	Palermo	Padova	
1932–33	Livorno	Brescia	
1933–34	Sampierdarenese	Bari^{a}	
1934–35	Genoa	Bari	
1935–36	Lucchese	Novara	
1936–37	Livorno	Atalanta	
1937–38	Modena^{b}	Novara^{b}	
1938–39	Fiorentina	Venezia	
1939–40	Atalanta	Livorno	
1940–41	Sampierdarenese	Modena	
1941–42	Bari	Vicenza	
1942–43	Modena	Brescia	
1945–46	Alessandria	Pro Patria^{a}	Napoli
1946–47	Northern champions	Central champions	Southern champions
1946–47	Pro Patria	Lucchese	Salernitana
1947–48	Novara	Padova	Palermo
1948–49	Champions	Runners-up	Other promoted
1948–49	Como	Venezia	
1949–50	Napoli	Udinese	
1950–51	SPAL	Legnano	
1951–52	Roma	Brescia^{a}	
1952–53	Genoa	Legnano	
1953–54	Catania	Pro Patria	
1954–55	Vicenza	Padova	
1955–56	Udinese	Palermo	
1956–57	Hellas Verona	Alessandria	
1957–58	Triestina	Bari	
1958–59	Atalanta	Palermo	
1959–60	Torino	Lecco	Catania
1960–61	Venezia	Mantova	Palermo
1961–62	Genoa	Napoli	Modena
1962–63	Messina	Bari	Lazio
1963–64	Varese	Cagliari	Foggia
1964–65	Brescia	Napoli	SPAL
1965–66	Venezia	Lecco	Mantova
1966–67	Sampdoria	Varese	
1967–68	Palermo	Hellas Verona	Pisa
1968–69	Lazio	Brescia	Bari
1969–70	Varese	Foggia	Catania
1970–71	Mantova	Atalanta	Catanzaro
1971–72	Ternana	Lazio	Palermo
1972–73	Genoa	Cesena	Foggia
1973–74	Varese	Ascoli	Ternana
1974–75	Perugia	Como	Hellas Verona
1975–76	Genoa	Catanzaro	Foggia
1976–77	Vicenza	Atalanta	Pescara
1977–78	Ascoli	Catanzaro	Avellino
1978–79	Udinese	Cagliari	Pescara
1979–80	Como	Pistoiese	Brescia
1980–81	Milan	Genoa	Cesena
1981–82	Hellas Verona	Pisa	Sampdoria
1982–83	Milan	Lazio	Catania
1983–84	Atalanta	Como	Cremonese
1984–85	Pisa	Lecce	Bari
1985–86	Ascoli	Brescia	Empoli
1986–87	Pescara	Pisa	Cesena
1987–88	Bologna	Lecce	Lazio, Atalanta
1988–89	Genoa	Bari	Udinese, Cremonese
1989–90	Torino	Pisa	Cagliari, Parma
1990–91	Foggia	Hellas Verona	Cremonese, Ascoli
1991–92	Brescia	Pescara	Ancona, Udinese
1992–93	Reggiana	Cremonese	Piacenza, Lecce
1993–94	Fiorentina	Bari	Brescia, Padova
1994–95	Piacenza	Udinese	Vicenza, Atalanta
1995–96	Bologna	Hellas Verona	Perugia, Reggiana
1996–97	Brescia	Empoli	Lecce, Bari
1997–98	Salernitana	Venezia	Cagliari, Perugia
1998–99	Hellas Verona	Torino	Reggina, Lecce
1999–2000	Vicenza	Atalanta	Brescia, Napoli
2000–01	Torino	Piacenza	Chievo, Venezia
2001–02	Como	Modena	Reggina, Empoli
2002–03	Siena	Sampdoria	Lecce, Ancona
2003–04	Palermo	Cagliari	Livorno, Messina, Atalanta, Fiorentina^{c}
2004–05	Empoli	Torino^{a}	Treviso, Ascoli
2005–06	Atalanta	Catania	Torino
2006–07	Juventus	Napoli	Genoa
2007–08	Chievo	Bologna	Lecce
2008–09	Bari	Parma	Livorno
2009–10	Lecce	Cesena	Brescia
2010–11	Atalanta	Siena	Novara
2011–12	Pescara	Torino	Sampdoria
2012–13	Sassuolo	Hellas Verona	Livorno
2013–14	Palermo	Empoli	Cesena
2014–15	Carpi	Frosinone	Bologna
2015–16	Cagliari	Crotone	Pescara
2016–17	SPAL	Hellas Verona	Benevento
2017–18	Empoli	Parma	Frosinone
2018–19	Brescia	Lecce	Hellas Verona
2019–20	Benevento	Crotone	Spezia
2020–21	Empoli	Salernitana	Venezia
2021–22	Lecce	Cremonese	Monza
2022–23	Frosinone	Genoa	Cagliari
2023–24	Parma	Como	Venezia
2024–25	Sassuolo	Pisa	Cremonese
2025–26	Venezia	Frosinone	Monza

^{a} Not promoted for Serie A reduction.

^{b} Modena and Novara were both awarded champions in 1937–38.

^{c} Six teams were promoted in 2003–04 due to the expansion of Serie A from 18 to 20 teams.

== Club performances ==
=== Performance by club ===
Updated as of 2025–26 season

Club	Winners	Runners-up	Winning years
Genoa	6	2	1935, 1953, 1962, 1973, 1976, 1989
Atalanta	5 (6)	3	(1928) 1940, 1959, 1984, 2006, 2011
Palermo	5	2	1932, 1948, 1968, 2004, 2014
Bari	4	6	1935, 1942, 1946, 2009
Brescia	4	6	1965, 1992, 1997, 2019
Hellas Verona	3	5	1957, 1982, 1999
Como	3	3	1949, 1980, 2002
Venezia	3	3	1961, 1966, 2026
Torino	3	2	1960, 1990, 2001
Varese	3	1	1964, 1970, 1974
Vicenza	3	1	1955, 1977, 2000
Empoli	3	1	2005, 2018, 2021
Fiorentina	3	–	1931, 1939, 1994
Novara	2 (3)	1	(1927) 1938, 1948
Napoli	2	3	1946, 1950
Lecce	2	2	2010, 2022
Pescara	2	2	1987, 2012
Udinese	2	2	1956, 1979
Ascoli	2	1	1978, 1986
Bologna	2	1	1988, 1996
Livorno	2	1	1933, 1937
Salernitana	2	1	1947, 1998
Lucchese	2	–	1936, 1947
Milan	2	–	1981, 1983
Sampierdarenese	2	–	1934, 1941
Sassuolo	2	–	2013, 2025
SPAL	2	–	1951, 2017
Pisa	1	4	1985
Modena	1	4	1943
Cagliari	1	3	2016
Padova	1	3	1948
Frosinone	1	2	2023
Lazio	1	2	1969
Parma	1	2	2024
Perugia	1	2	1975
Pro Patria	1	2	1947
Alessandria	1	1	1946
Catania	1	1	1954
Foggia	1	1	1991
Mantova	1	1	1971
Piacenza	1	1	1995
Reggiana	1	1	1993
Sampdoria	1	1	1967
Siena	1	1	2003
Ternana	1	1	1972
Benevento	1	–	2020
Carpi	1	–	2015
Casale	1	–	1930
Chievo	1	–	2008
Juventus	1	–	2007
Messina	1	–	1963
Roma	1	–	1952
Triestina	1	–	1958
Legnano	–	4	–
Catanzaro	–	2	–
Cesena	–	2	–
Cremonese	–	2	–
Crotone	–	2	–
Lecco	–	2	–
Pistoiese	–	1	–
Treviso	–	1	–

=== Titles by region ===
Updated as of 2025–26 season

Region	Titles	Winning club(s) (titles)
Lombardia	19	Atalanta (5), Brescia (4), Como (3), Varese (3), Milan (2), Mantova (1), Pro Patria (1)
Toscana	12	Empoli (3), Fiorentina (3), Livorno (2), Lucchese (2), Pisa (1), Siena (1)
Emilia-Romagna	11	Bologna (2), Sassuolo (2), SPAL (2), Carpi (1), Modena (1), Parma (1), Piacenza (1), Reggiana (1)
Veneto	11	Hellas Verona (3), Venezia (3), Vicenza (3), Chievo (1), Padova (1)
Liguria	8	Genoa (6), Sampierdarenese (2), Sampdoria (1)
Piemonte	7	Torino (3), Novara (2), Alessandria (1), Casale (1), Juventus (1)
Puglia	7	Bari (4), Lecce (2), Foggia (1)
Sicilia	7	Palermo (5), Catania (1), Messina (1)
Campania	5	Salernitana (2), Napoli (2), Benevento (1)
Friuli-Venezia Giulia	3	Udinese (2), Triestina (1)
Lazio	3	Frosinone (1), Lazio (1), Roma (1)
Abruzzo	2	Pescara (2)
Marche	2	Ascoli (2)
Umbria	2	Perugia (1), Ternana (1)
Sardinia	1	Cagliari (1)

=== Titles by city ===
Updated as of 2025–26 season

City	Titles	Winning club(s) (titles)
Genoa	9	Genoa (6), Sampierdarenese (2), Sampdoria (1)
Bergamo	5	Atalanta (5)
Palermo	5	Palermo (5)
Turin	4	Torino (3), Juventus (1)
Verona	4	Hellas Verona (3), Chievo (1)
Bari	4	Bari (4)
Brescia	4	Brescia (4)
Como	3	Como (3)
Empoli	3	Empoli (3)
Florence	3	Fiorentina (3)
Varese	3	Varese (3)
Venice	3	Venezia (3)
Vicenza	3	Vicenza (3)
Ascoli Piceno	2	Ascoli (2)
Bologna	2	Bologna (2)
Ferrara	2	SPAL (2)
Lecce	2	Lecce (2)
Livorno	2	Livorno (2)
Lucca	2	Lucchese (2)
Milan	2	Milan (2)
Naples	2	Napoli (2)
Novara	2	Novara (2)
Pescara	2	Pescara (2)
Rome	2	Lazio (1), Roma (1)
Salerno	2	Salernitana (2)
Sassuolo	2	Sassuolo (2)
Udine	2	Udinese (2)
Alessandria	1	Alessandria (1)
Benevento	1	Benevento (1)
Busto Arsizio	1	Pro Patria (1)
Cagliari	1	Cagliari (1)
Carpi	1	Carpi (1)
Casale Monferrato	1	Casale (1)
Catania	1	Catania (1)
Foggia	1	Foggia (1)
Frosinone	1	Frosinone (1)
La Spezia	1	Spezia (1)
Mantua	1	Mantova (1)
Messina	1	Messina (1)
Modena	1	Modena (1)
Padua	1	Padova (1)
Parma	1	Parma (1)
Perugia	1	Perugia (1)
Piacenza	1	Piacenza (1)
Pisa	1	Pisa (1)
Reggio Emilia	1	Reggiana (1)
Siena	1	Siena (1)
Terni	1	Ternana (1)
Trieste	1	Triestina (1)

=== Promotions by region ===
Updated as of 2024–25 season

Region	Promotions	Promoted clubs (266)
Lombardia	53	Atalanta (12), Brescia (12), Como (6), Cremonese (6), Varese (4), Legnano (3), Mantova (3), Lecco (2), Milan (2), Pro Patria (2), Monza (1)
Veneto	29	Hellas Verona (10), Venezia (7), Vicenza (5), Padova (4), Chievo (2), Treviso (1)
Emilia-Romagna	29	Modena (5), Cesena (5), Bologna (4), Parma (4), Piacenza (3), SPAL (3), Reggiana (2), Sassuolo (2), Carpi (1)
Toscana	29	Empoli (7), Livorno (6), Pisa (6), Fiorentina (4), Lucchese (2), Siena (2), Pistoiese (1)
Puglia	26	Bari (11), Lecce (10), Foggia (5)
Liguria	16	Genoa (9), Sampdoria (4) Sampierdarenese (2) Spezia (1)
Sicilia	16	Palermo (9), Catania (5), Messina (2)
Piemonte	14	Torino (6), Novara (4), Alessandria (2), Casale (1), Juventus (1)
Campania	11	Napoli (5), Salernitana (3), Benevento (2), Avellino (1)
Lazio	9	Lazio (5), Frosinone (3), Roma (1)
Calabria	7	Catanzaro (3), Reggina (2), Crotone (2)
Friuli-Venezia Giulia	7	Udinese (6), Triestina (1)
Marche	7	Ascoli (5), Ancona (2)
Sardinia	7	Cagliari (7)
Abruzzo	6	Pescara (6)
Umbria	5	Perugia (3), Ternana (2)

== Statistics and records ==
- Brescia has the record for most overall participations (66) and consecutive participations (18, from 1947–48 to 1964–65). They also hold the record for most relegations from Serie A to Serie B (13) and for relegations as newly promoted teams to Serie A (8).
- Taranto is the team with the most Serie B participations (31) among those who have never reached Serie A.
- Ascoli holds the record for the most points in a Serie B season with 20 teams (61 points, 2 points per win), with 26 wins, 9 draws, and 3 losses. This record was set in the 1977–78 season, where Ascoli also set records for most wins (26) and most consecutive home wins (14). In a 20-team Serie B season, with 3 points for a win, Benevento set the record for total points (86) with 26 wins, 8 draws, and 4 losses, sharing the record for most wins with Ascoli, achieved in the 2019–20 season.
- The record for the most points in a 22-team season (with 3 points for a win) belongs to Palermo (2013–14) with 86 points.
- The record for the most points in a 24-team season (with 3 points for a win) belongs to both Palermo and Cagliari (2003–04), who both finished with 83 points.
- Cremonese (1992–93), Verona (1998–99 and 2011–12), Torino (2000–01), Juventus (2006–07),Trapani (2015–16) and Venezia (2025–26) share the record for consecutive wins (8).
- The record for most away wins in a single Serie B season (13) is held by Palermo (2013–14).
- The record for consecutive away wins (8) is held by both Palermo (2013–14) and Benevento (2019–20).
- Atalanta and Genoa hold the record for the most Serie B championships won (6).
- Atalanta and Brescia are the teams with the most promotions to Serie A (12).
- The record for most wins in a single Serie B season is held by Juventus (28, in the 2006–07 season).
- The record for most wins in a Serie B season relative to the number of games played belongs to Brescia (23 wins out of 32 games in the 1932–33 season).
- Roma, Milan, and Juventus are the only clubs to have won every edition of the championship in which they participated.
- Inter Milan is the only club to have never been relegated from Serie A to Serie B; Inter is also the only Serie A club to have never participated in Serie B.
- SPAL holds the record for most goals scored in a Serie B season (95) during the 1949–50 season, while Bari holds the record for the fewest goals scored in a season (12) in 1973–74.
- The best defense was that of Genoa in the 1988–89 season, with only 13 goals conceded, while the worst defense was that of Pro Sesto (119) in the 1949–50 season.
- Napoli is the only Serie B team to have won the Coppa Italia (1961–62), after which they earned promotion to Serie A.
- No team has ever finished a Serie B season unbeaten. The best result was achieved by Perugia in the 1984–85 season, when the team lost only once in 38 matches.
- Perugia and Napoli hold the record for most draws in a Serie B season (26), with Perugia setting it in the 1984–85 season (with 20 teams) and Napoli in the 2003–04 season (with 24 teams).
- The record for most defeats in a Serie B season (35 out of 42 games) is held by Pro Sesto in the 1949–50 season.
- Benevento is the only team newly promoted to Serie A as a debutant in the Serie B. Other teams that were promoted to Serie A as non-debutant newly promoted teams include Como, Lecce, Modena, Udinese (twice each), and Bari, Bologna, Brescia, Cagliari, Cesena, Empoli, Fiorentina, Frosinone, Genoa, Napoli, Novara, Parma, SPAL, and Varese.
- Bari, Bologna, Brescia, Casale, Catanzaro, Como, Crotone, Cremonese, Empoli, Foggia, Lecce, Lucchese, Mantova, Padova, Pro Patria, SPAL, and Venezia are the teams relegated from Serie A who were relegated to a lower division (Serie C or C1) after one year in Serie B. Bologna experienced this in its debut season. Bari and Como are the only teams to have suffered this double relegation twice. Perugia and Siena also experienced this, but after corporate bankruptcy, while Catania was relegated twice due to match-fixing. Bari (1949–50 to 1951–52), Como (2002–03 to 2004–05), and Lucchese (1951–52 to 1953–54) are the teams that have experienced three consecutive relegations.
- Parma is, to date, the first and only team to have achieved three consecutive promotions from Serie D to Serie A, between the 2015–16 and 2017–18 seasons.
- Castel di Sangro is, to date, the smallest city (around 5,500 inhabitants at the time) to have a team who has participated in Serie B.

== Top scorers ==
Season	Top scorer(s)	Club(s)	Goals
1929–30	(Italy) Luigi Demarchi	Casale	19
1930–31	(Italy) Gastone Prendato	Padova	25
1931–32	(Italy) Carlo Radice	Palermo	28
1932–33	(Italy) Marco Romano	Como	29
1933–34	(Italy) Remo Galli	Modena	26
1934–35	(Italy) Marco Romano	Novara	30
1935–36	(Italy) Vinicio Viani	Lucchese	34
1936–37	(Italy) Bruno Arcari	Livorno	30
1937–38	(Italy) Otello Torri	Novara	25
1938–39	(Italy) Alfredo Diotalevi	Spezia	21
1939–40	(Italy) Vinicio Viani	Livorno	35
1940–41	(Italy) Vittorio Sentimenti	Modena	24
1940–41	(Italy) Renato Gei	Brescia	24
1941–42	(Italy) Giovanni Costanzo	Spezia	24
1942–43	(Italy) Giovanni Costanzo	Spezia	22
1942–43	(Italy) Luigi Gallanti	Fanfulla	22
1943–45: Cancelled due to World War II
1945–46	(Italy) Bruno Mazza	Crema	17
1946–47	(Italy) Aldo Boffi	Seregno	32
1947–48	(Italy) Aurelio Pavesi De Marco	Palermo	23
1948–49	(Italy) Attilio Frizzi	SPAL	25
1949–50	(Italy) Ettore Bertoni	Brescia	30
1950–51	(Italy) Ettore Bertoni	Legnano	25
1951–52	(Italy) Attilio Frizzi	Genoa	20
1952–53	(Italy) Alvaro Zian	Fanfulla	19
1953–54	(Italy) Michele Manenti	Catania	15
1954–55	(Italy) Achille Fraschini	Brescia	14
1954–55	(Italy) Enrico Motta	Vicenza	14
1954–55	(Italy) Giancarlo Rebizzi	Legnano	14
1955–56	(Italy) Aurelio Milani	Monza	23
1956–57	(Italy) Paolo Erba	Parma	16
1957–58	(Italy) Pietro Biagioli	Valdagno	19
1958–59	(Argentina) Santiago Vernazza	Palermo	19
1959–60	(Italy) Giuseppe Virgili	Torino	20
1960–61	(Italy) Giovanni Fanello	Alessandria	25
1961–62	(Italy) Renzo Cappellaro	Alessandria	21
1962–63	(Italy) Cosimo Nocera	Foggia	24
1963–64	(Italy) Romano Taccola	Prato	19
1964–65	(Brazil) Sergio Clerici	Lecco	20
1964–65	(Italy) Virginio De Paoli	Brescia	20
1965–66	(Italy) Gianni Bui	Catanzaro	18
1966–67	(Italy) Fulvio Francesconi	Sampdoria	20
1967–68	(Italy) Lucio Mujesan	Bari	19
1968–69	(Italy) Virginio De Paoli	Brescia	18
1969–70	(Italy) Roberto Bettega	Varese	13
1969–70	(Italy) Aquilino Bonfanti	Catania	13
1969–70	(Italy) Ariedo Braida	Varese	13
1970–71	(Italy) Sergio Magistrelli	Como	15
1970–71	(Italy) Alberto Spelta	Modena	15
1971–72	(Italy) Giorgio Chinaglia	Lazio	21
1972–73	(Italy) Fabio Enzo	Seregno	15
1973–74	(Italy) Egidio Calloni	Varese	15
1973–74	(Italy) Giacomo La Rosa	Palermo	15
1974–75	(Italy) Fabio Bonci	Parma	14
1975–76	(Italy) Roberto Pruzzo	Genoa	18
1975–76	(Italy) Giuliano Musiello	Avellino	18
1976–77	(Italy) Paolo Rossi	Vicenza	21
1977–78	(Italy) Massimo Palanca	Catanzaro	18
1978–79	(Italy) Oscar Damiani	Genoa	17
1979–80	(Italy) Marco Nicoletti	Como	13
1980–81	(Italy) Roberto Antonelli	Milan	15
1981–82	(Italy) Giovanni De Rosa	Palermo	19
1982–83	(Italy) Bruno Giordano	Lazio	18
1983–84	(Italy) Marco Pacione	Atalanta	15
1984–85	(Italy) Edi Bivi	Bari	20
1985–86	(Italy) Oliviero Garlini	Lazio	19
1986–87	(Italy) Stefano Rebonato	Pescara	21
1987–88	(Italy) Lorenzo Marronaro	Bologna	21
1988–89	(Italy) Salvatore Schillaci	Messina	23
1989–90	(Italy) Andrea Silenzi	Reggiana	23
1990–91	(Italy) Francesco Baiano	Foggia	22
1990–91	(Argentina) Abel Balbo	Udinese	22
1990–91	(Brazil) Walter Casagrande	Ascoli	22
1991–92	(Italy) Maurizio Ganz	Brescia	19
1992–93	(Germany) Oliver Bierhoff	Ascoli	20
1993–94	(Italy) Massimo Agostini	Ancona	18
1994–95	(Italy) Giovanni Pisano	Salernitana	21
1995–96	(Italy) Dario Hübner	Cesena	22
1996–97	(Italy) Davide Dionigi	Reggina	24
1997–98	(Italy) Marco Di Vaio	Salernitana	21
1998–99	(Italy) Marco Ferrante	Torino	27
1999–2000	(Italy) Cosimo Francioso	Genoa	24
2000–01	(Italy) Nicola Caccia	Piacenza	23
2001–02	(Belgium) Luís Oliveira	Como	23
2002–03	(Italy) Igor Protti	Livorno	23
2003–04	(Italy) Luca Toni	Palermo	30
2004–05	(Italy) Gionatha Spinesi	Arezzo	22
2005–06	(Italy) Cristian Bucchi	Modena	29
2006–07	(Italy) Alessandro Del Piero	Juventus	20
2007–08	(Italy) Denis Godeas	Mantova	28
2008–09	(Italy) Francesco Tavano	Livorno	24
2009–10	(Italy) Éder	Empoli	26
2010–11	(Italy) Federico Piovaccari	Cittadella	24
2011–12	(Italy) Ciro Immobile	Pescara	28
2012–13	(Italy) Daniele Cacia	Verona	24
2013–14	(Italy) Matteo Mancosu	Trapani	26
2014–15	(Italy) Andrea Cocco	Vicenza	19
2014–15	(Italy) Andrea Catellani	Spezia	19
2014–15	(Uruguay) Pablo Granoche	Modena	19
2015–16	(Peru) Gianluca Lapadula	Pescara	23
2016–17	(Italy) Giampaolo Pazzini	Verona	23
2017–18	(Italy) Francesco Caputo	Empoli	26
2018–19	(Italy) Alfredo Donnarumma	Brescia	25
2019–20	(Nigeria) Simy	Crotone	20
2020–21	(Italy) Massimo Coda	Lecce	22
2021–22	(Italy) Massimo Coda	Lecce	20
2022–23	(Peru) Gianluca Lapadula	Cagliari	21
2023–24	(Finland) Joel Pohjanpalo	Venezia	22
2024–25	(France) Armand Laurienté	Sassuolo	18
2025–26	(Finland) Joel Pohjanpalo	Palermo	24

== Awards ==
Year	MVP of the Season	MVP of the Playoffs	Ref
2021-22	(Italy) Massimo Coda (Lecce)	(Denmark) Christian Gytkjaer (Monza)	
2022-23	(Peru) Gianluca Lapadula (Cagliari)	(Italy) Leonardo Pavoletti (Cagliari)	
2023-24	(Italy) Patrick Cutrone (Como)	–	
2024-25	(France) Armand Laurienté (Sassuolo)	(Italy) Manuel De Luca (Cremonese)	
2025-26	(Italy) Andrea Adorante (Venezia)	(Brazil) Hernani (Monza)	

== TV rights ==
Season	Pay television rights	Free-to-air rights
1993–94	TELE+ (32 advance matches)	Rai
1994–95	TELE+ (32 advance matches)	Rai
1995–96	TELE+ (32 advance matches)	Rai
1996–97	TELE+/TELE+ Digitale	Rai
1997–98	TELE+/TELE+ Digitale	Rai
1998–99	TELE+/TELE+ Digitale	Rai
1999–2000	TELE+/TELE+ Digitale; Stream TV	Rai
2000–01	TELE+/TELE+ Digitale; Stream TV	Rai
2001–02	TELE+/TELE+ Digitale; Stream TV	Rai
2002–03	TELE+/TELE+ Digitale (home matches of 5 clubs); Stream TV (home matches of 15 clubs)	Rai
2003–04	Sky (home matches of 18 clubs); Gioco Calcio (home matches of 6 clubs)	Rai
2004–05	Sky	Rai
2005–06	―	Sportitalia (advance matches, postponed matches, play-offs and play-outs); Rai (selection from all remaining matches, both live and delayed)
2006–07	Sky (satellite); Mediaset Premium (digital terrestrial; matches involving Juventus, Napoli and Genoa)	Sportitalia (selected live matches during the opening rounds); Rai
2007–08	Sky (satellite; pay-per-view); ContoTV (digital terrestrial; pay-per-view)	Rai; Sportitalia selected local broadcasters
2008–09	Sky (satellite); Cartapiù/Dahlia TV (digital terrestrial)	Rai; Sportitalia
2009–10	Sky (satellite); Dahlia TV (digital terrestrial)	Rai; Sportitalia
2010–11	Sky (satellite); Dahlia TV (digital terrestrial; until matchday 27); Mediaset Premium (digital terrestrial; from matchday 34 onward, including one rescheduled match from matchday 30, play-offs and play-outs)	Rai; Sportitalia
2011–12	Sky (satellite and streaming); Mediaset Premium (digital terrestrial and streaming; from matchday 4 onward, including play-offs and play-outs)	Rai; Sportitalia
2012–13	Sky (satellite and streaming); Mediaset Premium (digital terrestrial and streaming; advance matches, postponed matches and play-offs); Serie B TV (digital terrestrial, from matchday 9 onward for the remaining matches)	Rai; Sportitalia
2013–14	Sky (satellite and streaming); Mediaset Premium (digital terrestrial and streaming; advance matches, postponed matches, play-offs and play-outs)	Rai; Sportitalia; LT Multimedia
2014–15	Sky (satellite and streaming); Mediaset Premium (digital terrestrial and streaming; advance matches, postponed matches, play-offs and play-outs)	Rai
2015–16	Sky	Rai
2016–17	Sky	Rai
2017–18	Sky	Rai
2018–19	DAZN	Rai (Friday night advance match and first and second legs of the play-off final)
2019–20	DAZN	Rai (Friday night advance match and first and second legs of the play-off final)
2020–21	DAZN	Rai (Friday night advance match and first and second legs of the play-off final)
2021–22	Sky; DAZN (streaming); HelbizLive (streaming)	–
2022–23	Sky; DAZN (streaming); HelbizLive (streaming)	–
2023–24	Sky; DAZN (streaming)	–
2024–25	DAZN Sky (From week 31 to 38 and play-offs only for business subscriptions); La B Channel (streaming)	DAZN (1 match per matchday out of 10)
2025–26	DAZN; Sky (play-off final); La B Channel (streaming); OneFootball (streaming)	DAZN (1 match per matchday out of 10); TV8 (play-off final)
2026–27	DAZN; La B Channel (streaming); OneFootball (streaming)	DAZN (1 match per matchday out of 10)

== Sponsorships ==
From the 1998–99 season to the 2009–10 season, Serie B used its first commercial name, Serie B TIM, following a sponsorship agreement with TIM, an Italian telecommunications company, which involved all the competitions organized by Lega Calcio.

Starting from the 2010–11 season, following the division within the Lega Calcio and the creation of the new Lega Serie B, the second tier of Italian football began managing its own search for title sponsors. The league adopted various commercial names, including: Serie bwin (2010–2013), Serie B Eurobet (2013–2014), Serie B ConTe.it (2015–2018), Serie BKT (since 2018). In the 2014–15 season, the play-off and play-out rounds received an additional sponsor: Compass, which led to the names Playoff Compass and Playout Compass for those phases of the competition.

Furthermore, in the 2013–2014 season, Serie B introduced a single top sponsor for all teams participating in the league, which appeared on the back of the players' jerseys for the first time. This sponsorship was repeated in the 2014–15 and 2018–19 seasons.

Period	Title sponsor	Play-off and Play-out sponsor	Top sponsor	Other sponsors
1998-2010	Serie B TIM	–	–	–
2010-2013	Serie bwin	–	–	–
2013-2014	Serie B Eurobet	–	NGM	CAME Automazione (shorts sponsor)
2014-2015	–	Compass	NGM	CAME Automazione (shorts sponsor)
2015-2018	Serie B ConTe.it	–	–	–
2018-2019	Serie BKT	–	Unibet	Facile Ristrutturare (sleeve sponsor)
2019-2020	Serie BKT	–	–	Facile Ristrutturare (sleeve sponsor)
2020-	Serie BKT	–	–	–

== See also ==
- Italian football league system
- List of football clubs in Italy
- Sports league attendances
