= 1965–66 Serie B =

Italian football league season

Serie B
- Season: 1965–66
- Champions: Venezia; 2nd title

Serie B 1965-66 team distribution

The Serie B 1965–66 was the thirty-fourth tournament of this competition played in Italy since its creation.

== Teams ==
Novara, Pisa and Reggina had been promoted from Serie C, while Genoa, Messina and Mantova had been relegated from Serie A.

== Final classification ==
Pos	Team	Pld	W	D	L	GF	GA	GR	Pts	Promotion or relegation
1	Venezia (P, C)	38	18	13	7	53	34	1.559	49	Promotion to Serie A
2	Lecco (P)	38	17	14	7	43	26	1.654	48	Promotion to Serie A
3	Mantova (P)	38	14	18	6	45	26	1.731	46	Promotion to Serie A
4	Reggina	38	16	13	9	46	32	1.438	45	
5	Genoa	38	15	14	9	44	35	1.257	44	
6	Verona	38	11	18	9	35	32	1.094	40	
7	Livorno	38	12	14	12	33	32	1.031	38	
7	Messina	38	9	20	9	27	29	0.931	38	
9	Padova	38	13	11	14	45	42	1.071	37	
10	Catanzaro	38	10	16	12	38	40	0.950	36	
10	Potenza	38	13	10	15	37	40	0.925	36	
10	Novara	38	8	20	10	31	42	0.738	36	
13	Modena	38	6	23	9	32	32	1.000	35	
13	Alessandria	38	10	15	13	26	37	0.703	35	
15	Palermo	38	9	16	13	34	34	1.000	34	
15	Reggiana	38	9	16	13	32	39	0.821	34	
15	Pisa	38	12	10	16	30	37	0.811	34	
18	Pro Patria (R)	38	10	13	15	38	50	0.760	33	Relegation to Serie C
19	Monza (R)	38	12	8	18	32	45	0.711	32	Relegation to Serie C
20	Trani (R)	38	6	18	14	31	48	0.646	30	Relegation to Serie C

Source: Panini
(C) Champions; (P) Promoted; (R) Relegated

== Results ==
Home \ Away	ALE	CTZ	GEN	LCO	LIV	MAN	MES	MOD	MON	NOV	PAD	PAL	PIS	POT	PPA	REA	REG	TRN	VEN	HEL
Alessandria		0–0	0–0	0–0	1–0	0–0	1–0	0–0	0–1	1–1	0–0	3–0	1–0	1–0	0–0	2–1	1–1	1–0	0–1	1–2
Catanzaro	0–0		2–0	0–0	1–0	1–0	1–1	0–0	1–0	3–0	1–0	1–2	5–1	2–2	3–1	0–0	1–2	2–2	0–1	1–0
Genoa	1–1	1–0		1–0	3–1	1–1	3–1	1–0	2–1	0–0	2–2	3–0	1–0	1–0	1–1	2–0	3–1	3–2	1–1	1–1
Lecco	3–1	1–1	0–1		1–1	0–5	0–0	2–1	2–1	4–0	1–0	2–0	1–0	2–0	3–1	4–2	0–0	2–0	0–0	0–0
Livorno	2–1	0–0	1–1	1–0		1–0	1–0	4–2	2–1	0–0	5–2	1–0	0–0	1–0	4–2	0–0	0–1	2–0	0–1	1–1
Mantova	2–2	6–1	1–0	0–0	2–0		2–0	0–0	0–0	1–0	0–0	2–2	2–0	0–0	1–0	1–1	2–0	2–2	2–2	1–2
Messina	1–0	1–0	0–0	2–0	1–0	0–0		0–0	1–0	0–0	1–0	0–0	0–0	1–1	0–0	1–1	1–1	0–0	3–0	0–0
Modena	4–0	2–2	1–1	0–2	1–1	0–0	1–3		0–0	0–0	1–1	2–1	1–2	0–0	4–0	0–0	1–0	0–0	1–1	1–1
Monza	1–0	0–2	1–4	0–2	2–2	3–0	0–1	1–0		2–2	0–0	1–0	2–1	1–0	1–1	0–0	1–2	2–0	0–1	3–2
Novara	0–1	1–1	1–1	0–0	1–0	1–3	1–1	1–1	0–1		1–1	0–0	0–0	3–0	1–1	1–0	1–4	3–0	1–1	2–1
Padova	1–0	0–0	2–0	1–0	1–1	0–1	4–1	0–0	2–0	3–1		1–3	2–1	2–0	0–2	4–0	1–0	5–0	1–2	1–1
Palermo	0–0	0–0	2–1	2–3	2–0	0–0	1–1	1–1	4–0	0–0	4–1		0–0	1–2	2–0	1–0	1–2	0–0	0–1	0–0
Pisa	0–0	2–1	1–1	1–0	0–1	3–0	0–0	1–0	1–0	0–1	1–0	1–2		3–1	1–0	0–2	0–0	1–0	3–0	1–2
Potenza	2–0	1–1	2–0	2–3	0–1	0–1	1–0	1–1	0–0	1–2	2–0	1–0	4–1		0–0	3–2	1–0	2–2	2–0	2–0
Pro Patria	3–1	3–1	1–0	1–2	0–0	2–3	1–1	0–0	0–3	0–1	2–1	2–1	3–0	2–0		2–1	1–1	0–0	1–0	1–1
Reggiana	1–2	3–2	2–0	0–0	1–0	0–0	1–1	1–1	2–0	0–0	0–2	1–1	0–3	2–0	2–1		0–0	2–0	1–1	2–1
Reggina	4–1	3–1	2–0	0–0	2–0	0–0	1–1	0–1	1–0	3–0	3–1	1–1	2–1	0–1	1–0	2–1		1–0	1–1	0–0
Trani	0–0	0–0	1–2	1–1	1–0	1–0	3–1	1–1	4–1	2–2	1–2	1–0	0–0	1–2	2–2	0–0	2–2		2–1	0–0
Venezia	3–0	2–0	0–0	0–0	0–0	1–4	2–1	2–3	3–1	5–2	3–1	0–0	0–0	2–0	6–1	1–0	2–0	3–0		2–1
Hellas Verona	2–3	2–0	2–1	0–2	0–0	0–0	2–0	1–0	0–1	0–0	1–1	0–0	2–0	2–1	1–0	0–0	3–2	0–0	1–1	

Source: Almanacco Illustrato del Calcio - La Storia 1898-2004, Panini Edizioni, Modena, September 2005 (in Italian)
Legend: Blue = home team win; Yellow = draw; Red = away team win.

== Attendances ==
#	Club	Average
1	Livorno	12,032
2	Reggina	11,691
3	Genoa	11,368
4	Mantova	10,885
5	Palermo	10,599
6	Venezia	8,979
7	Modena	8,763
8	Hellas	8,245
9	Lecco	7,959
10	Reggiana	6,914
11	Pisa	6,905
12	Alessandria	6,895
13	Novara	6,589
14	Padova	6,443
15	Messina	5,970
16	Catanzaro	4,878
17	Monza	4,648
18	Trani	4,240
19	Potenza	3,648
20	Pro Patria	3,166

== References and sources ==
- Almanacco Illustrato del Calcio - La Storia 1898-2004, Panini Edizioni, Modena, September 2005

Specific
