= Derby di Sicilia =

Local derby between Italian football clubs

- Other names: Sicilian Derby
- Location: Italy
- Teams: Palermo; Catania
- First meeting: Catania 1–0 Palermo; Coppa Italia (25 December 1935)
- Latest meeting: Catania 2-0 Palermo; Serie C (12 December 2021)
- Next meeting: TBD
- Stadiums: Stadio Renzo Barbera (Palermo); Stadio Angelo Massimino (Catania)

Statistics
- Total meetings: 85
- Most wins: Palermo (26)
- Top scorer: Giuseppe Mascara (4)
- Largest victory: Palermo 5–0 Catania; Serie B (4 April 2004)

The Derby di Sicilia or Sicilian Derby in English, is a local derby between Italian football clubs Catania FC and Palermo FC. Catania and Palermo are the two main cities on the island of Sicily, and the teams are fierce rivals. However, they have seldom played each other within the Italian football league system, because in many seasons they have played in separate divisions of the league. The first time the Sicilian derby took place in the context of league football was on 1 November 1936 at Palermo in Serie B level; it ended in a 1–1 draw. The Sicilian derby has been played 10 times in Serie A: Catania leading their rivals by 5 victories to Palermo's 4; the other occasion was drawn. The teams have also met in local Sicilian competitions, and friendly matches.

The most notorious derby was on 2 February 2007, when 40-year-old policeman Filippo Raciti died in Catania from severe liver injuries during riots following the derby. The events led FIGC commissioner Luca Pancalli to indefinitely suspend all professional and amateur football games in the country.

For the 2007 season, all Palermo fans were banned from Catania's Stadio Massimino for the Catania-Palermo match on 2 December 2007. Catania subsequently proceeded to defeat Palermo 3–1, a historic derby win for Catania, their first in Serie A.

== Statistics ==
As of 3 March 2021

Competition	Played	Palermo	Draws	Catania
Serie A	18	5	7	6
Serie B	34	8	19	7
Serie C/C1	16	4	9	3
Coppa Italia	8	6	1	1
Coppa Italia Serie C	10	3	4	3
Total	85	26	39	20

== Results ==
=== League results ===
Catania win Draw Palermo win

		Catania vs Palermo		Palermo vs Catania	
Season	Division	Date	Score	Date	Score
2020–21	Serie C	3 March 2021	0–1	9 November 2020	1–1
2012–13	Serie A	21 April 2013	1–1	24 November 2012	3–1
2011–12	Serie A	18 December 2011	2–0	28 April 2012	1–1
2010–11	Serie A	3 April 2011	4–0	14 November 2010	3–1
2009–10	Serie A	3 April 2010	2–0	22 November 2009	1–1
2008–09	Serie A	19 October 2008	2–0	1 March 2009	0–4
2007–08	Serie A	2 December 2007	3–1	12 April 2008	1–0
2006–07	Serie A	2 February 2007	1–2^{(1)}	20 September 2006	5–3
2003–04	Serie B	9 November 2003	0–2	4 April 2004	5–0
2002–03	Serie B	18 November 2002	2–0	19 April 2003	3–3
2000–01	Serie C1/B	4 March 2001	1–1	23 October 2000	5–1
1999–2000	Serie C1/B	16 April 2000	0–0	5 December 1999	1–1
1992–93	Serie C1/B	27 September 1992	0–0	21 February 1993	0–2
1990–91	Serie C1/B	9 December 1990	1–0	5 May 1991	3–0
1989–90	Serie C1/B	11 March 1990	1–1	22 October 1989	1–0
1988–89	Serie C1/B	28 May 1989	1–1	31 December 1988	0–0
1985–86	Serie B	1 December 1985	1–0	4 May 1986	0–0
1982–83	Serie B	20 March 1983	2–0	24 October 1982	0–0
1981–82	Serie B	3 January 1982	3–1	23 May 1982	0–2^{(2)}
1980–81	Serie B	21 December 1980	3–3	24 May 1981	2–0
1976–77	Serie B	20 March 1977	1–1	31 October 1976	0–0
1975–76	Serie B	14 December 1975	1–1	2 May 1976	1–1
1973–74	Serie B	6 January 1974	1–1	19 May 1974	1–1
1971–72	Serie B	5 March 1972	1–1	17 October 1971	1–0
1967–68	Serie B	26 November 1967	1–2	21 April 1968	0–0
1966–67	Serie B	11 December 1966	1–0	7 May 1967	0–1
1962–63	Serie A	17 February 1963	0–0	14 October 1962	0–0
1961–62	Serie A	17 September 1961	0–0	21 January 1962	0–0
1958–59	Serie B	9 November 1958	0–0	22 March 1959	1–0
1957–58	Serie B	16 March 1958	0–0	3 November 1957	1–1
1955–56	Serie B	22 January 1956	1–1	3 June 1956	3–3
1941–42	Serie C	1 January 1942	4–1	8 March 1942	1–1
1939–40	Serie B	29 October 1939	1–1	24 March 1940	1–0
1936–37	Serie B	28 February 1937	0–1	1 November 1936	1–1

^{(1)} See 2007 Catania football violence for more details about the riots during and following the match.
^{(2)} 2–0 Catania victory later awarded by the Federation. The match ended in a 1–0 win for Palermo.

=== Cup results ===
Season	Competition	Round	Date	Home team	Result	Away team
2000–01	Coppa Italia Serie C	Round of 16	29 November 2000	Palermo	1–1	Catania
2000–01	Coppa Italia Serie C	Round of 16	10 January 2001	Catania	2–1	Palermo
1999–2000	Coppa Italia Serie C	Round of 32	13 October 1999	Palermo	2–2	Catania
1999–2000	Coppa Italia Serie C	Round of 32	27 October 1999	Catania	0–0	Palermo
1998–99	Coppa Italia Serie C	Group stage	30 August 1998	Catania	2–0	Palermo
1992–93	Coppa Italia Serie C	Final group	13 January 1993	Catania	1–2	Palermo
1990–91	Coppa Italia Serie C	Round of 16	20 December 1990	Palermo	2–0	Catania
1990–91	Coppa Italia Serie C	Round of 16	24 January 1991	Catania	1–0	Palermo
1989–90	Coppa Italia Serie C	Quarter final	22 February 1990	Palermo	3–1	Catania
1989–90	Coppa Italia Serie C	Quarter final	15 March 1990	Catania	1–1	Palermo
1981–82	Coppa Italia	Group stage	6 September 1981	Palermo	1–0	Catania
1980–81	Coppa Italia	Group stage	7 September 1980	Catania	2–3	Palermo
1969–70	Coppa Italia	Group stage	31 August 1969	Palermo	4–1	Catania
1968–69	Coppa Italia	Group stage	15 September 1968	Catania	1–1	Palermo
1964–65	Coppa Italia	Second round	6 January 1965	Palermo	1–0	Catania
1959–60	Coppa Italia	First round	6 September 1959	Palermo	2–0	Catania
1937–38	Coppa Italia	Third round	4 November 1937	Palermo	4–1	Catania
1935–36	Coppa Italia	Round of 32	25 December 1935	Catania	1–0	Palermo

=== Sicilian derbies with Atletico Catania ===
For five seasons, Palermo played an "alternate" Sicilian derby against Atletico Catania, a minor team which reached its peak during the late 1990s, when it was the major football club in Catania, following the disbandment of the old Calcio Catania. In 1999–2000 and 2000–2001, Palermo contested derbies with both Catania and Atletico Catania, as all three teams were playing Serie C1/B at the time.

		Atletico Catania vs Palermo		Palermo vs Atletico Catania	
Season	Division	Date	Score	Date	Score
2000–01	Serie C1/B	26 November 2000	0–1	8 April 2001	0–0
1999–00	Serie C1/B	10 October 1999	0–1	13 February 2000	1–0
1998–99	Serie C1/B	24 January 1999	0–1	20 September 1998	2–1
1997–98	Serie C1/B	19 October 1997	2–0	8 March 1998	1–0
1987–88	Serie C2/D		2–2		1–0
