= GSF Giovanni Grion Pola =

Italian football club

Grion Pola
- Full name: Gruppo Sportivo Fascio; Giovanni Grion Pola
- Nickname: Nerostellati (Starred-blacks)
- Founded: 1918; 108 years ago
- Dissolved: 1945; 81 years ago
- Ground: unknown, Pola/Pula, Italy (now in Croatia)
Home colours	Away colours

Gruppo Sportivo Fascio Giovanni Grion Pola was an Italian association football club located in Pola, now Pula in Croatia. The team was founded in 1918 as F.C. Grion Pola and was dissolved in 1945, when their home city passed from Italy to Yugoslavia. Its colors were black and white.

The club took part in two Serie B seasons in the 1930s and retired during their third.

The side was named after an Istrian soldier who died during the First World War and their home colours were the same as Casale's, to honour their scudetto, won in 1914.
