= List of US Livorno 1915 seasons =

U.S. Livorno 1915 is an Italian football club based in the town of Livorno, Italy.

== History ==
A.S. Livorno Calcio were one of the original teams competing in Serie A. However, their time in Serie A didn't last long. In 1931, Livorno was relegated back to Serie B, where they spent two years there before being promoted to Serie A again. Livorno fluctuated between Serie A and Serie B until 1943, when they withdrew from the competition due to World War II.

After World War II ended, Livorno still struggled in Serie A and was eventually relegated to Serie B again in 1949. Livorno struggled here as well, and was relegated again to Serie C. In 1955, Livorno was promoted to Serie B again for one season, where they finished 17th and wound up being relegated back to Serie C. Livorno spent the rest of the 1950s and half of the 1960s in Serie C, even after the expansion in 1959. Finally, after six seasons in Serie C, Livorno was promoted to Serie B again.

Livorno's standing positions were erratic for the following years they spent in Serie B. Eventually, in 1972, they were relegated again to Serie C.

Livorno stayed in Serie C until Serie C was split into two categories: Serie C1 and Serie C2. Livorno finished one place ahead of the relegation zone, and would compete in Serie C1 for another five seasons. In 1983, Livorno was relegated to Serie C2 after finishing 15th. After one season, Livorno was promoted to Serie C1 again for another five seasons, before being relegated again to Serie C2. After playing two seasons in Serie C2, the club was cancelled and had to start from the lowest level on the Italian Football ladder, Eccellenza Toscana.

After only one season in Eccellenza Toscana, Livorno was promoted to Campionato Nazionale Dilettanti after finishing first and then promoted again the next year to Serie C2. After four more seasons in Serie C2, the club was promoted to Serie C1 in 1997. Though they dropped from third to twelfth in their first two years back in Serie C1, they eventually rose to seventh, then third, then first to bring themselves back into Serie B.

Livorno played two seasons in Serie B. In the 2002–03 season, they finished tenth, but in the next season they finished third and were promoted to Serie A for the first time since 1949.

Livorno immediately made an impact in the league, finished ninth their first year and finishing sixth the next, qualifying for their first ever UEFA Cup appearance. The next season, however, they dropped down to eleventh and then again in the next season (2007–08) to twentieth, being relegated to Serie B once again.

Livorno was promoted back to Serie A for the 2009–10 season, but then relegated to Serie B that same season, finishing 20th again. Livorno spent three more years in Serie B until being promoted again through playoffs to Serie A, but again only for one season. Livorno was relegated to Serie B in 2014, where they spent two seasons before being relegated again to Lega Pro for the 2016–17 season. In their first year in Lega Pro, Livorno finished 3rd in their respective group (Group A) and qualified for the promotion playoffs, where they were eliminated in the quarterfinals and would therefore remain in Lega Pro the following season. Following the 2016–17 Lega Pro season, the name of the league was changed back to Serie C.

After spending two seasons playing third-division football, Livorno won Group A of the 2017–18 Serie C season and were promoted back to Serie B for the 2018–19 season. They finished 14th, before finishing 20th the following season and being relegated back to Serie C, and were relegated for a second consecutive season after finishing 20th in Group A during the 2020-21 Serie C season.

== Seasons ==
=== All seasons ===
Results of League Competitions by season
Season	Division	P	W	D	L	Pts	Pos
1929–30	Serie A	34	12	5	17	29	14th
1930–31	Serie A	34	6	8	20	20	17th
1931–32	Serie B	34	13	10	11	36	8th
1932–33	Serie B	32	22	7	3	51	1st
1933–34	Serie A	34	11	12	11	34	8th
1934–35	Serie A	30	8	8	14	24	15th
1935–36	Serie B	34	19	9	6	47	3rd
1936–37	Serie B	30	17	8	5	42	1st
1937–38	Serie A	30	8	8	14	24	12th
1938–39	Serie A	30	9	6	15	24	15th
1939–40	Serie B	34	21	4	9	46	2nd
1940–41	Serie A	30	9	10	11	28	13th
1941–42	Serie A	30	9	6	15	24	14th
1942–43	Serie A	30	18	7	5	43	2nd
1943–46	Withdrew due to World War II						
1946–47	Serie A	38	9	15	14	33	15th
1947–48	Serie A	40	11	14	15	36	15th
1948–49	Serie A	38	9	8	21	26	20th
1949–50	Serie B	42	19	8	15	46	8th
1950–51	Serie B	40	19	9	12	47	4th
1951–52	Serie B	38	12	10	16	34	17th
1952–53	Serie C	34	12	11	11	35	7th
1953–54	Serie C	34	14	10	10	38	7th
1954–55	Serie C	34	17	11	6	45	2nd
1955–56	Serie B	34	7	8	19	22	17th
1956–57	Serie C	34	11	9	14	31	12th
1957–58	Serie C	34	10	6	18	26	17th
1958–59	Serie C	40	19	8	13	46	5th
1959–60	Serie C	34	18	10	6	46	2nd in GB
1960–61	Serie C	34	16	10	8	42	3rd in GB
1961–62	Serie C	34	10	11	13	31	13th in GB
1962–63	Serie C	34	15	11	8	41	4th in GB
1963–64	Serie C	34	19	10	5	48	1st in GB
1964–65	Serie B	38	11	12	15	34	16th
1965–66	Serie B	38	12	14	12	38	7th
1966–67	Serie B	38	12	11	15	35	16th
1967–68	Serie B	40	16	11	13	43	7th
1968–69	Serie B	38	11	13	14	35	12th
1969–70	Serie B	38	11	16	11	38	9th
1970–71	Serie B	38	10	16	12	36	14th
1971–72	Serie B	38	7	12	19	26	18th
1972–73	Serie C	38	15	12	11	42	6th in GB
1973–74	Serie C	38	10	15	13	35	13th in GB
1974–75	Serie C	38	13	10	15	36	13th in GB
1975–76	Serie C	38	14	12	12	40	7th in GB
1976–77	Serie C	38	9	17	12	35	15th in GB
1977–78	Serie C	38	12	14	12	38	11th in GB
1978–79	Serie C1	34	6	20	8	32	12th in GB
1979–80	Serie C1	34	12	16	6	40	3rd in GB
1980–81	Serie C1	34	10	12	12	32	14th in GB
1981–82	Serie C1	34	7	17	10	31	12th in GB
1982–83	Serie C1	34	8	14	12	30	15th in GB
1983–84	Serie C2	32	18	14	0	50	1st in GA
1984–85	Serie C1	34	10	15	9	35	7th in GA
1985–86	Serie C1	34	7	16	11	30	14th in GA
1986–87	Serie C1	34	8	16	10	32	12th in GA
1987–88	Serie C1	34	8	10	16	26	14th in GA
1988–89	Serie C1	34	4	12	18	20	18th in GA
1989–90	Serie C2	34	8	15	11	31	10th in GA
1990–91	Serie C2	34	10	18	6	38	4th in GA
1991–92	Eccellenza Toscana	34	24	9	1	57	1st
1992–93	Serie D	34	17	15	2	49	2nd in GC
1993–94	Serie C2	34	17	11	6	62	3rd in GB
1994–95	Serie C2	34	15	11	8	53	4th in GB
1995–96	Serie C2	34	18	10	6	64	2nd in GB
1996–97	Serie C2	34	19	10	5	67	2nd in GB
1997–98	Serie C1	34	19	5	10	58	3rd in GA
1998–99	Serie C1	34	8	16	10	40	12th in GA
1999–2000	Serie C1	34	10	16	8	46	7th in GA
2000–01	Serie C1	34	17	12	5	63	3rd in GA
2001–02	Serie C1	34	20	13	1	73	1st in GA
2002–03	Serie B	38	12	13	13	49	10th
2003–04	Serie B	46	20	19	7	79	3rd
2004–05	Serie A	38	11	12	15	45	9th
2005–06	Serie A	38	12	13	13	49	6th
2006–07	Serie A	38	10	13	15	43	11th
2007–08	Serie A	38	6	12	20	30	20th
2008–09	Serie B	42	16	20	6	68	3rd
2009–10	Serie A	38	7	8	23	29	20th
2010–11	Serie B	42	15	14	13	59	7th
2011–12	Serie B	42	12	12	18	48	17th
2012–13	Serie B	42	23	11	8	80	3rd
2013–14	Serie A	38	6	7	25	25	20th
2014–15	Serie B	42	15	14	13	59	9th
2015–16	Serie B	42	10	12	20	42	20th
2016–17	Lega Pro	38	19	12	7	69	3rd in GA
2017–18	Serie C	36	20	8	8	68	1st in GA
2018–19	Serie B	36	9	12	15	39	14th
2019–20	Serie B	38	5	6	27	21	20th
2020–21	Serie C	38	7	13	18	41	20th in GA
2021–22	Serie D	0	0	0	0	0	TBD

Accurate as of 6 July 2021

- 1938–39: Relegated on goal differential.
- 1959: GB stands for Group B, which is the league Livorno was placed in when they were in Serie C after the expansion.
- 1978: Serie C is split into Serie C1 and Serie C2. Livorno managed to finish 11th and qualified for Serie C1. Serie C1 was still split into Groups A and B.
- 1983–84: Livorno was relegated to Serie C2 and was placed in Group A, where they were promoted after only one season back to Serie C1, where they were placed in Group A.
- 1991: Club cancelled and forced to start from Eccellenza.
- 1992–93: League known then as "Campionato Nazionale Dilettanti." GC stands for Group C.
- 2016–17: GA stands for Group A.

=== Statistics ===
Overall Statistics
Division	Seasons	GP	W	D	L
Serie A	18	626	171	172	283
Serie B	27	1,034	376	311	347
Serie C/C1/Lega Pro	34	1,230	434	430	366
Serie C2	7	236	105	89	42
Serie D	1	34	17	15	2
Eccellenza Tuscany	1	34	24	9	1
TOTAL	88	3,194	1,127	1,026	1,041

Accurate as of 6 July 2021

=== Key ===
- P = Played
- W = Games won
- D = Games drawn
- L = Games lost
- F = Goals for
- A = Goals against
- Pts = Points
- Pos = Final position
- T = Tied
- GP = Games played
