= 1970–71 Serie C =

The 1970–71 Serie C was the thirty-third edition of Serie C, the third highest league in the Italian football league system.

== Girone A ==
Serie C Gir. A 1970-71 team distribution
Serie C Gir. B 1970-71 team distribution
Serie C Gir. B 1970-71 team distribution in Tuscany
Serie C Gir. C 1970-71 team distribution
Serie C Gir. C 1970-71 team distribution in Campania

Pos	Team	Pld	W	D	L	GF	GA	GD	Pts	Promotion or relegation
1	Reggiana	38	21	16	1	46	9	+37	58	Promoted to Serie B
2	Alessandria	38	19	14	5	43	20	+23	52	
3	Padova	38	20	9	9	50	32	+18	49	
4	Venezia	38	14	14	10	36	32	+4	42	
5	Parma	38	14	13	11	50	39	+11	41	
6	Solbiatese	38	14	13	11	37	30	+7	41	
7	Trento	38	11	19	8	28	21	+7	41	
8	Lecco	38	12	16	10	45	37	+8	40	
9	Treviso	38	15	9	14	33	31	+2	39	
10	Udinese	38	13	11	14	35	38	−3	37	
11	Seregno	38	10	16	12	35	38	−3	36	
12	Rovereto	38	10	15	13	23	25	−2	35	
13	Legnano	38	9	17	12	20	27	−7	35	
14	Verbania	38	9	17	12	27	34	−7	35	
15	Piacenza	38	8	18	12	23	31	−8	34	
16	Derthona	38	8	16	14	19	35	−16	32	
17	Pro Patria	38	7	17	14	33	46	−13	31	
18	Triestina	38	9	13	16	27	45	−18	31 (Note: Relegated for goal difference.)	Relegated to Serie D
19	Monfalcone	38	5	16	17	28	50	−22	26	Relegated to Serie D
20	Sottomarina	38	9	7	22	23	41	−18	25	Relegated to Serie D

== Girone B ==
Pos	Team	Pld	W	D	L	GF	GA	GD	Pts	Promotion or relegation
1	Genoa	38	22	12	4	36	12	+24	56	Promoted to Serie B
2	S.P.A.L.	38	19	16	3	42	18	+24	54	
3	Sambenedettese	38	17	13	8	38	20	+18	47	
4	Del Duca Ascoli	38	17	10	11	35	27	+8	44	
5	Rimini	38	15	13	10	39	26	+13	43	
6	Lucchese	38	15	12	11	41	31	+10	42	
7	Prato	38	14	13	11	35	35	0	41	
8	Maceratese	38	14	11	13	28	32	−4	39	
9	Spezia	38	11	15	12	33	37	−4	37	
10	Viareggio	38	10	17	11	22	28	−6	37	
11	Entella	38	12	12	14	32	30	+2	36	
12	Imperia	38	11	13	14	29	34	−5	35	
13	Empoli	38	9	16	13	27	29	−2	34	
14	Olbia	38	10	14	14	24	29	−5	34	
15	Savona	38	8	18	12	29	36	−7	34	
16	Anconitana	38	9	15	14	26	34	−8	33	
17	Imola	38	11	11	16	32	46	−14	33	
18	Aquila Montevarchi	38	8	16	14	26	31	−5	32	Relegated to Serie D
19	Torres	38	8	11	19	22	40	−18	27	Relegated to Serie D
20	Ravenna	38	4	14	20	22	43	−21	22	Relegated to Serie D

== Girone C ==
Pos	Team	Pld	W	D	L	GF	GA	GD	Pts	Promotion or relegation
1	Sorrento	38	19	13	6	33	12	+21	51	Promoted to Serie B
2	Salernitana	38	20	10	8	40	20	+20	50	
3	Brindisi	38	16	15	7	37	19	+18	47	
4	Lecce	38	16	14	8	39	28	+11	46	
5	Potenza	38	14	13	11	33	26	+7	41	
6	Acquapozzillo	38	11	18	9	23	22	+1	40	
7	Matera	38	9	20	9	24	24	0	38	
8	Messina	38	11	16	11	25	26	−1	38	
9	Cosenza	38	15	8	15	28	32	−4	38	
10	Savoia	38	9	19	10	22	26	−4	37	
11	Martina	38	10	17	11	22	30	−8	37	
12	Pescara	38	13	10	15	25	27	−2	36	
13	Chieti	38	12	10	16	31	30	+1	34	
14	Viterbese	38	11	12	15	25	30	−5	34	
15	Crotone	38	11	12	15	25	36	−11	34	
16	Avellino	38	7	19	12	17	24	−7	33	
17	Pro Vasto	38	10	13	15	27	36	−9	33	
18	Enna	38	6	21	11	13	24	−11	33 (Note: Relegated for goal difference.)	Relegated to Serie D
19	Barletta	38	7	17	14	19	27	−8	31	Relegated to Serie D
20	Internapoli	38	7	15	16	27	36	−9	29	Relegated to Serie D

== References and sources ==
- Almanacco Illustrato del Calcio – La Storia 1898–2004, Panini Edizioni, Modena, September 2005
