= Oleksandr Demchenko =

Ukrainian footballer

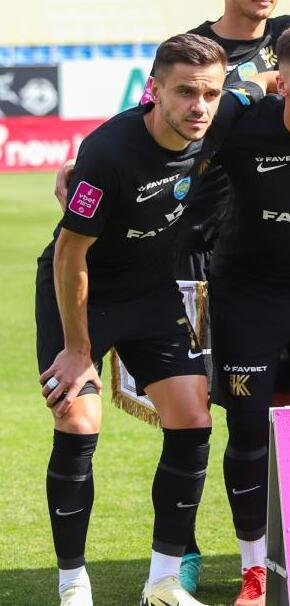

Personal information
- Full name: Oleksandr Viktorovych Demchenko
- Date of birth: 13 February 1996 (age 30)
- Place of birth: Vinnytsia, Ukraine
- Height: 1.81 m (5 ft 11 in)
- Position: Midfielder

Team information
- Current team: Kolos Kovalivka
- Number: 7

Youth career
- 2008–2009: Nyva Vinnytsia
- 2009–2010: Shakhtar Donetsk
- 2010–2011: Nyva Vinnytsia
- 2011–2013: LVUFK Lviv

Senior career*
Years	Team	Apps	(Gls)
2013–2015	Illichivets Mariupol	0	(0)
2015–2016	Vinnytsia (amateurs)	21	(7)
2016–2017	Abano	5	(0)
2017–2019	Portuense		
2019	Nyva Vinnytsia	10	(2)
2019	Metalist 1925 Kharkiv	0	(0)
2019–2020	Nyva Vinnytsia	13	(0)
2020–2021	Nyva Ternopil	13	(1)
2021	Kremin Kremenchuk	13	(1)
2021–2022	Oleksandriya	28	(1)
2023	Chornomorets Odesa	13	(3)
2023–	Kolos Kovalivka	76	(1)
- * Club domestic league appearances and goals as of 3 June 2026

Oleksandr Viktorovych Demchenko (Ukrainian: Олександр Вікторович Демченко; born 13 February 1996) is a Ukrainian professional footballer who plays as a midfielder for Kolos Kovalivka.

== Career ==
Born in Vinnytsia, Demchenko is a product of the sportive schools from his native city and of the Shakhtar Donetsk academy and Lviv State School of Physical Culture.

After playing in the lower leagues teams in Ukraine and Italy, in July 2021, he signed a contract with the Ukrainian Premier League side Oleksandriya.
