= 1973–74 Serie B =

Italian football league season

Serie B
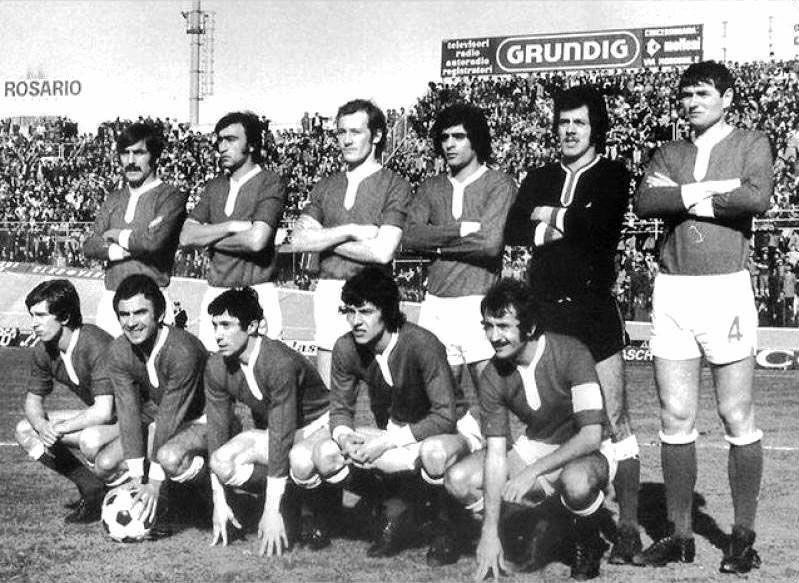
- 1973–74 Varese squad
- Season: 1973–74
- Champions: Varese; 3rd title

Serie B 1973-74 team distribution

The Serie B 1973–74 was the forty-second tournament of this competition played in Italy since its creation.

== Teams ==
Parma, SPAL and Avellino had been promoted from Serie C, while Atalanta, Palermo and Ternana had been relegated from Serie A.

== Final classification ==
Pos	Team	Pld	W	D	L	GF	GA	GD	Pts	Promotion or relegation
1	Varese (P, C)	38	18	15	5	51	28	+23	51	Promotion to Serie A
2	Ascoli (P)	38	16	19	3	41	22	+19	51	Promotion to Serie A
3	Ternana (P)	38	18	14	6	46	20	+26	50	Promotion to Serie A
4	Como	38	15	16	7	37	27	+10	46	
5	Parma	38	10	19	9	39	32	+7	39	
6	Taranto	38	11	17	10	27	26	+1	39	
7	Palermo	38	9	21	8	35	42	−7	39	
8	Novara	38	12	14	12	33	34	−1	38	
9	S.P.A.L.	38	11	16	11	29	32	−3	38	
10	Arezzo	38	12	13	13	42	41	+1	37	
11	Atalanta	38	11	14	13	24	24	0	36	
12	Brescia	38	10	16	12	35	36	−1	36	
13	Catanzaro	38	11	13	14	31	37	−6	35	
14	Avellino	38	11	13	14	34	39	−5	35	
15	Perugia	38	10	14	14	30	31	−1	34	
16	Reggiana	38	9	16	13	30	37	−7	34	
17	Brindisi	38	8	18	12	27	37	−10	34	
18	Reggina (R)	38	10	14	14	20	34	−14	34	Relegation to Serie C (Note: Reggina relegated for goal difference.)
19	Bari (R)	38	9	10	19	12	26	−14	28	Relegation to Serie C
20	Catania (R)	38	5	16	17	21	39	−18	26	Relegation to Serie C

Source: Panini
(C) Champions; (P) Promoted; (R) Relegated

== Results ==
Home \ Away	ARE	ASC	ATA	AVE	BAR	BRE	BRI	CTN	CTZ	COM	NOV	PAL	PAR	PER	REA	REG	SPA	TAR	TER	VAR
Arezzo		0–0	0–1	3–0	1–0	1–0	1–0	2–0	2–0	2–2	2–0	4–2	0–0	4–1	2–2	0–0	1–0	2–0	1–1	1–1
Ascoli	1–1		1–1	2–0	1–0	2–0	1–1	2–1	1–0	1–1	2–0	2–0	1–1	1–0	1–0	1–0	3–0	1–0	2–1	0–0
Atalanta	0–0	1–1		1–0	2–1	1–0	0–0	1–0	0–0	0–1	0–1	1–1	1–1	1–0	3–0	0–0	0–0	1–0	0–1	2–1
Avellino	1–0	2–2	2–1		1–0	1–0	2–3	1–0	1–1	1–1	3–1	0–0	2–0	0–0	1–0	3–0	0–2	1–1	1–0	1–1
Bari	0–1	0–0	0–2	1–0		1–0	1–0	0–1	0–1	0–0	2–0	0–0	0–0	1–0	1–0	0–1	0–0	0–0	1–0	0–0
Brescia	3–2	0–1	1–0	0–0	1–0		1–0	0–0	1–1	1–1	1–1	4–0	0–0	0–0	2–1	3–1	0–1	2–0	1–1	1–1
Brindisi	1–1	1–1	2–1	1–1	2–0	0–0		2–1	1–0	0–0	0–0	0–0	2–1	0–0	2–1	0–0	1–1	0–1	1–1	1–2
Catania	2–1	1–1	1–0	1–0	0–1	1–2	1–1		0–1	0–0	0–2	1–1	0–0	0–1	0–0	1–1	2–2	0–0	1–2	0–0
Catanzaro	3–3	1–0	0–0	2–3	1–0	1–0	2–0	0–1		0–0	1–1	1–1	2–0	0–0	1–0	2–1	2–0	1–0	0–1	1–1
Como	1–0	0–1	1–0	2–1	0–0	1–0	1–1	2–1	2–0		0–0	2–0	2–0	3–2	1–0	1–0	0–0	3–1	1–1	1–0
Novara	1–0	3–1	1–0	0–0	2–0	1–2	1–1	0–0	2–1	2–2		1–1	1–1	2–1	2–0	2–0	1–0	1–0	0–0	1–2
Palermo	2–1	1–1	0–0	2–0	1–0	1–1	0–2	1–1	3–2	2–1	1–1		0–0	1–0	2–2	1–1	2–2	1–0	1–0	1–0
Parma	6–1	0–0	1–1	1–0	0–1	1–1	4–0	1–1	4–0	2–0	1–0	3–1		0–2	0–0	2–0	1–0	1–1	1–0	2–2
Perugia	2–0	1–3	0–0	1–0	2–0	1–1	2–0	0–0	1–0	1–2	3–1	2–1	1–1		1–1	0–1	3–0	0–0	0–0	0–1
Reggiana	1–1	0–0	1–0	1–1	1–0	1–1	2–0	4–1	1–1	1–0	1–0	2–0	0–0	1–1		2–0	0–0	0–0	1–1	0–4
Reggina	1–0	0–0	1–0	1–0	1–0	2–1	1–0	1–0	1–0	1–1	1–1	0–0	1–1	0–0	1–1		0–2	0–1	0–0	0–0
SPAL	1–1	0–0	3–1	1–1	1–0	1–3	1–0	0–0	0–0	1–1	1–0	1–1	0–0	1–0	0–1	1–0		3–1	0–2	1–2
Taranto	1–0	1–0	0–0	0–0	0–0	1–0	0–0	3–1	2–1	1–0	0–0	0–0	3–1	1–1	3–1	2–0	0–0		0–0	3–3
Ternana	2–0	2–2	1–0	3–1	2–0	5–0	0–0	1–0	0–0	1–0	1–0	2–2	3–0	2–0	2–0	4–1	0–1	1–0		1–0
Varese	2–0	1–1	0–1	3–2	1–0	1–1	4–1	2–0	3–1	2–0	2–0	1–1	2–1	1–0	1–0	1–0	2–1	0–0	1–1	

Source: Almanacco Illustrato del Calcio - La Storia 1898-2004, Panini Edizioni, Modena, September 2005 (in Italian)
Legend: Blue = home team win; Yellow = draw; Red = away team win.

== Attendances ==
#	Club	Average
1	Palermo	15,134
2	Ternana	14,335
3	SPAL	11,738
4	Taranto	11,578
5	Parma	10,538
6	Atalanta	10,244
7	Bari	10,224
8	Reggiana	9,788
9	Brescia	9,036
10	Ascoli	8,962
11	Catania	8,396
12	Catanzaro	7,973
13	Avellino	7,238
14	Como	6,685
15	Reggina	6,334
16	Perugia	6,255
17	Brindisi	6,228
18	Varese	6,032
19	Novara	4,901
20	Arezzo	4,871

== References and sources ==
- Almanacco Illustrato del Calcio - La Storia 1898-2004, Panini Edizioni, Modena, September 2005

Specific
