= Giovan Battista Fabbri =

Italian footballer and manager

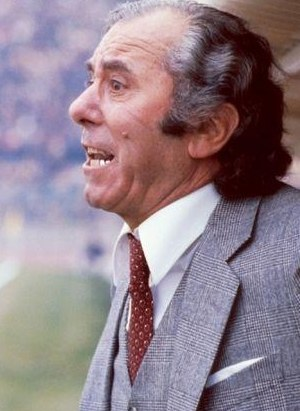
- Fabbri coaching Vicenza.

Personal information
- Date of birth: 8 March 1926
- Place of birth: San Pietro in Casale, Kingdom of Italy
- Date of death: 2 June 2015 (aged 89)
- Place of death: Ferrara, Italy
- Position: Midfielder

Managerial career
- Years: Team
- 1957–1959: Varese
- 1964–1965: SPAL
- 1969–1970: SPAL
- 1970–1971: Cesena
- 1971–1972: Sangiovannese
- 1972–1973: Giulianova
- 1973–1974: Livorno
- 1974–1976: Piacenza
- 1976–1979: Vicenza
- 1979–1981: Ascoli
- 1981–1982: Cesena
- 1982–1983: Reggiana
- 1983–1984: Catania
- 1984–1985: Catanzaro
- 1985–1986: Foggia
- 1986–1987: Bologna
- 1987–1988: SPAL
- 1988–1989: Venezia
- 1989–1990: Catanzaro
- 1990–1993: SPAL

Giovan Battista Fabbri (8 March 1926 – 2 June 2015) was an Italian football player and manager.

== Career ==
Fabri managed a number of Italian club sides, including Varese, SPAL, Sangiovannese, Giulianova, Livorno, Piacenza, Vicenza, Ascoli, Cesena, Reggiana, Catania, Catanzaro, Foggia, Bologna, and Venezia.
