= Luis Fernando Centi =

Italian footballer

Personal information
- Date of birth: 16 September 1976 (age 50)
- Place of birth: Savona, Italy
- Height: 1.79 m (5 ft 10 in)
- Position: Midfielder

Senior career*
Years	Team	Apps	(Gls)
1994–1995	Piacenza	1	(1)
1995–1997	Carpi	35	(0)
1997–1998	Ospitaletto	32	(2)
1998–1999	Pro Patria	23	(5)
1999–2000	Varese	29	(8)
2000–2001	Como	27	(1)
2001–2002	Varese	14	(1)
2002–2004	Lumezzane	56	(8)
2004–2005	Treviso	31	(3)
2005–2006	Livorno	8	(0)
2006–2007	Atalanta	5	(0)
2007–2008	Ascoli	8	(0)
2008–2010	SPAL	36	(1)
2010	Gallipoli	4	(1)
- * Club domestic league appearances and goals

Luis Fernando Centi (born 16 September 1976) is an Italian former footballer who played as a midfielder.

His mother is from Colombia.

== Club career ==
Centi was signed by Ascoli Calcio 1898 on 23 January 2007.
