= 1967–68 Serie B =

Italian football league season

Serie B
- Season: 1967–68
- Champions: Palermo; 2nd title

Serie B 1967-68 team distribution

The Serie B 1967–68 was the thirty-sixth tournament of this competition played in Italy since its creation.

== Teams ==
Monza, Perugia and Bari had been promoted from Serie C, while Lazio, Foggia, Venezia and Lecco had been relegated from Serie A.

== Events ==
Transitional relegations were imposed to restore the format.

== Final classification ==
Pos	Team	Pld	W	D	L	GF	GA	GR	Pts	Promotion or relegation
1	Palermo (P, C)	40	18	16	6	40	23	1.739	52	Promotion to Serie A
2	Verona (P)	40	17	14	9	41	27	1.519	48	Promotion to Serie A
2	Pisa (P)	40	17	14	9	48	32	1.500	48	Promotion to Serie A
4	Bari	40	18	11	11	55	41	1.341	47	
4	Foggia	40	15	17	8	40	33	1.212	47	
6	Reggiana	40	15	15	10	41	32	1.281	45	
7	Livorno	40	16	11	13	34	32	1.063	43	
8	Monza	40	12	18	10	49	45	1.089	42	
9	Reggina	40	13	15	12	45	47	0.957	41	
10	Catania	40	14	12	14	41	38	1.079	40	
11	Lazio	40	10	18	12	27	33	0.818	38	
12	Modena	40	10	17	13	39	41	0.951	37	
12	Padova	40	12	13	15	31	33	0.939	37	
12	Catanzaro	40	9	19	12	26	32	0.813	37	
15	Perugia	40	10	16	14	38	45	0.844	36	Relegation tie-breaker
16	Lecco	40	7	22	11	35	40	0.875	36	Relegation tie-breaker
17	Genoa	40	9	18	13	36	31	1.161	36	Relegation tie-breaker
18	Venezia (R)	40	10	16	14	25	30	0.833	36	Serie C after tie-breaker
19	Messina (R)	40	10	16	14	21	37	0.568	36	Serie C after tie-breaker
20	Novara (R)	40	8	19	13	31	40	0.775	35	Relegation to Serie C
21	Potenza (R)	40	4	15	21	24	55	0.436	23	Relegation to Serie C

Source: Panini
(C) Champions; (P) Promoted; (R) Relegated

== Results ==
Home \ Away	BAR	CTN	CTZ	FOG	GEN	LAZ	LCO	LIV	MES	MOD	MON	NOV	PAD	PAL	PER	PIS	POT	REA	REG	VEN	HEL
Bari		1–0	0–0	2–2	1–0	3–1	3–1	1–0	2–0	2–0	3–2	1–0	2–0	1–0	4–1	4–0	1–0	4–0	1–2	1–0	1–2
Catania	5–1		1–3	0–0	1–1	0–0	0–0	2–1	0–0	2–0	0–0	4–1	1–0	1–2	1–0	1–0	4–1	1–4	2–0	0–0	0–1
Catanzaro	1–0	1–1		1–1	2–1	0–0	1–1	0–1	0–0	1–1	2–0	0–0	1–0	2–0	0–0	1–2	2–1	1–3	1–1	1–0	1–1
Foggia	1–1	1–0	0–0		1–0	0–0	0–0	2–2	2–1	2–1	0–1	3–1	0–1	1–0	1–0	2–1	2–1	1–2	2–1	1–1	1–0
Genoa	2–0	0–1	0–0	1–1		4–0	1–1	0–0	0–0	0–0	2–0	2–0	0–0	0–1	0–0	0–1	1–0	1–1	1–0	1–1	3–1
Lazio	1–2	1–0	1–0	1–0	0–0		1–0	0–2	1–0	0–2	1–0	2–0	3–0	2–1	0–0	0–0	2–2	0–0	1–1	0–1	2–2
Lecco	1–1	1–1	1–1	1–1	2–1	1–1		2–0	2–0	0–0	2–3	1–1	0–2	0–1	3–1	0–1	2–0	0–0	0–0	2–2	0–2
Livorno	2–0	3–0	0–0	0–0	0–3	1–0	0–1		1–1	0–0	2–2	1–0	1–0	0–0	2–1	2–0	2–0	1–1	2–0	1–0	0–0
Messina	1–1	0–2	0–0	1–0	1–1	1–0	1–1	2–0		1–1	1–0	0–1	1–0	1–0	0–0	0–0	1–0	1–0	2–4	1–0	0–0
Modena	2–2	3–1	2–0	1–1	2–1	0–0	1–1	1–1	0–0		1–1	2–1	1–2	3–1	2–1	1–1	3–0	1–0	2–0	2–3	1–1
Monza	1–1	3–0	1–0	1–1	1–1	1–1	2–2	1–0	2–0	1–1		1–1	2–0	0–0	1–2	2–1	4–1	0–1	1–0	2–0	1–0
Novara	1–0	0–1	2–0	0–0	1–1	2–0	1–1	3–0	0–1	2–1	1–1		0–0	0–0	1–1	0–0	0–0	1–1	3–1	1–0	1–1
Padova	2–1	1–0	2–0	1–2	2–2	1–1	1–0	1–2	2–1	0–0	1–0	0–0		0–0	0–0	3–2	3–0	0–0	2–0	0–0	1–2
Palermo	1–1	0–0	2–0	1–1	2–1	0–0	0–1	1–0	3–0	1–0	3–3	3–0	1–0		2–0	2–1	2–2	1–0	1–0	2–0	0–0
Perugia	1–1	3–1	0–0	0–1	1–0	0–0	3–2	0–1	2–1	0–0	1–1	4–2	1–0	1–1		1–2	1–1	1–0	0–2	1–0	3–1
Pisa	5–2	1–1	1–0	1–0	1–0	1–0	2–0	3–0	5–0	1–0	2–2	1–1	0–0	0–1	2–1		0–0	0–0	2–2	3–0	3–1
Potenza	0–2	2–1	1–1	1–2	0–2	0–0	1–1	0–1	0–0	0–1	2–2	1–0	4–2	0–1	1–0	1–1		0–0	2–2	0–0	0–1
Reggiana	1–0	0–1	1–2	1–1	2–1	3–1	0–0	2–1	0–0	2–0	2–0	0–0	2–0	2–2	4–2	0–0	1–0		1–1	2–0	0–0
Reggina	1–0	1–4	1–0	3–2	2–0	2–1	1–1	0–1	0–0	3–1	4–3	0–0	2–1	1–1	1–1	0–0	0–0	1–0		0–0	0–0
Venezia	0–0	0–0	0–0	0–1	0–0	0–0	2–0	1–0	2–0	1–0	0–0	1–1	0–0	0–1	0–0	1–0	1–0	2–1	2–3		3–0
Hellas Verona	1–1	1–0	2–0	2–0	1–1	1–0	0–0	1–0	2–0	2–1	0–0	3–0	1–0	0–0	1–1	0–1	4–0	3–0	2–1	0–1	

Source: Almanacco Illustrato del Calcio - La Storia 1898-2004, Panini Edizioni, Modena, September 2005 (in Italian)
Legend: Blue = home team win; Yellow = draw; Red = away team win.

== Relegation tie-breaker ==
=== First round ===
Classification

	Team	Pts	Comments
1.	Genoa	5	
1.	Lecco	5	
1.	Perugia	5	
1.	Venezia	5	
5.	Messina	0	Relegated to Serie C

Results

Team 1	Score	Team 2
Genoa (Italy)	0-1	(Italy) Lecco
Genoa (Italy)	3-0	(Italy) Messina
Genoa (Italy)	1-1	(Italy) Perugia
Genoa (Italy)	2-0	(Italy) Venezia
Lecco (Italy)	1-0	(Italy) Messina
Lecco (Italy)	1-2	(Italy) Perugia
Lecco (Italy)	0-0	(Italy) Venezia
Messina (Italy)	0-3	(Italy) Perugia
Messina (Italy)	0-2	(Italy) Venezia
Perugia (Italy)	0-3	(Italy) Venezia

=== Second round ===
Classification

	Team	Pts	Comments
1.	Perugia	5	
2.	Lecco	4	
3.	Genoa	3	
4.	Venezia	0	Relegated to Serie C

Results

Team 1	Score	Team 2
Genoa (Italy)	0-2	(Italy) Perugia
Genoa (Italy)	2-1	(Italy) Venezia
Genoa (Italy)	0-0	(Italy) Lecco
Lecco (Italy)	0-0	(Italy) Perugia
Lecco (Italy)	3-0	(Italy) Venezia
Perugia (Italy)	2-1	(Italy) Venezia

== Attendances ==
#	Club	Average
1	Palermo	23,682
2	Bari	17,832
3	Lazio	15,586
4	Hellas	15,009
5	Foggia	12,259
6	Livorno	12,141
7	Pisa	11,297
8	Genoa	10,844
9	Reggina	10,366
10	Catania	9,509
11	Perugia	8,782
12	Padova	7,789
13	Messina	7,364
14	Modena	7,324
15	Reggiana	7,077
16	Venezia	6,327
17	Novara	6,307
18	Monza	5,833
19	Lecco	5,260
20	Catanzaro	3,801
21	Potenza	3,590

== References and sources ==
- Almanacco Illustrato del Calcio - La Storia 1898-2004, Panini Edizioni, Modena, September 2005

Specific
