= 1968–69 Serie C =

The 1968–69 Serie C was the thirty-first edition of Serie C, the third highest league in the Italian football league system.

== Group A (North) ==
Pos	Team	Pld	W	D	L	GF	GA	GD	Pts	Promotion or relegation
1	Piacenza (P)	38	22	11	5	53	21	+32	55	Promoted to Serie B
2	Triestina	38	17	15	6	47	29	+18	49	
3	Solbiatese	38	19	10	9	54	37	+17	48	
4	Treviso	38	14	18	6	34	22	+12	46	
5	Savona	38	15	14	9	34	25	+9	44	
6	Udinese	38	14	15	9	44	23	+21	43	
7	Alessandria	38	13	16	9	40	30	+10	42	
8	Novara	38	12	16	10	42	33	+9	40	
9	Monfalcone	38	12	15	11	41	40	+1	39	
10	Legnano	38	11	16	11	31	35	−4	38	
11	Trevigliese	38	7	23	8	34	33	+1	37	
12	Venezia	38	10	17	11	31	33	−2	37	
13	Pro Patria	38	11	13	14	38	44	−6	35	
14	Biellese	38	9	16	13	30	36	−6	34	
15	Verbania	38	9	15	14	25	35	−10	33	
16	Sottomarina	38	9	15	14	34	47	−13	33	
17	Marzotto	38	9	14	15	35	46	−11	32	
18	Cremonese (R)	38	8	16	14	28	39	−11	32 (Note: Relegated after tie-breaker match in Brescia: Cremonese-Marzotto 1-2)	Relegated to Serie D
19	Asti Ma.Co.Bi. (R)	38	7	9	22	30	63	−33	23	Relegated to Serie D
20	Rapallo Ruentes (R)	38	3	14	21	18	52	−34	20	Relegated to Serie D

Source: Panini
(P) Promoted; (R) Relegated

== Group B (Centre) ==
Pos	Team	Pld	W	D	L	GF	GA	GD	Pts	Promotion or relegation
1	Arezzo	38	22	11	5	43	19	+24	55	Promoted to Serie B
2	Massese	38	15	19	4	32	14	+18	49	
3	Del Duca Ascoli	38	15	15	8	30	26	+4	45	
4	Siena	38	12	19	7	41	30	+11	43	
5	Anconitana	38	13	16	9	32	24	+8	42	
6	Torres	38	14	12	12	36	33	+3	40	
7	Viareggio	38	14	11	13	40	35	+5	39	
8	Olbia	38	10	19	9	26	29	−3	39	
9	Sambenedettese	38	12	14	12	31	24	+7	38	
10	Prato	38	10	18	10	32	27	+5	38	
11	Pistoiese	38	11	16	11	27	31	−4	38	
12	Empoli	38	11	15	12	26	28	−2	37	
13	Ravenna	38	8	21	9	29	32	−3	37	
14	Vis Pesaro	38	9	19	10	24	31	−7	37	
15	Entella	38	10	16	12	27	32	−5	36	
16	Spezia	38	8	19	11	25	27	−2	35	
17	Rimini	38	7	21	10	27	30	−3	35	
18	Jesi	38	8	17	13	33	40	−7	33	Relegated to Serie D
19	Maceratese	38	7	13	18	22	36	−14	27	Relegated to Serie D
20	Forlì	38	1	15	22	16	51	−35	17	Relegated to Serie D

== Group C (South) ==
Pos	Team	Pld	W	D	L	GF	GA	GD	Pts	Promotion or relegation
1	Taranto	38	21	12	5	44	16	+28	54	Promoted to Serie B
2	Casertana	38	22	12	4	52	18	+34	50 (Note: 6 points deducted for sport illicit.)	
3	Internapoli	38	16	15	7	49	24	+25	47	
4	Brindisi	38	14	15	9	37	26	+11	43	
5	Lecce	38	14	14	10	34	30	+4	42	
6	Saleritana	38	13	14	11	38	31	+7	40	
7	Chieti	38	15	8	15	34	33	+1	38	
8	Messina	38	10	17	11	31	26	+5	37	
9	Barletta	38	13	11	14	32	38	−6	37	
10	Avellino	38	12	12	14	36	34	+2	36	
11	Potenza	38	11	14	13	35	37	−2	36	
12	Cosenza	38	12	12	14	31	35	−4	36	
13	Crotone	38	10	15	13	24	28	−4	35	
14	Matera	38	10	15	13	33	37	−4	35	
15	Pescara	38	8	19	11	24	30	−6	35	
16	Trapani	38	8	18	12	21	33	−12	34	
17	Massiminiana	38	11	10	17	25	42	−17	32	
18	Nardò	38	10	11	17	18	35	−17	31	Relegated to Serie D
19	Marsala	38	10	11	17	30	54	−24	31	Relegated to Serie D
20	L'Aquila	38	7	11	20	28	49	−21	25	Relegated to Serie D

== References and sources ==
- Almanacco Illustrato del Calcio – La Storia 1898–2004, Panini Edizioni, Modena, September 2005
