= Savino Bellini =

Italian footballer (1913–1974)

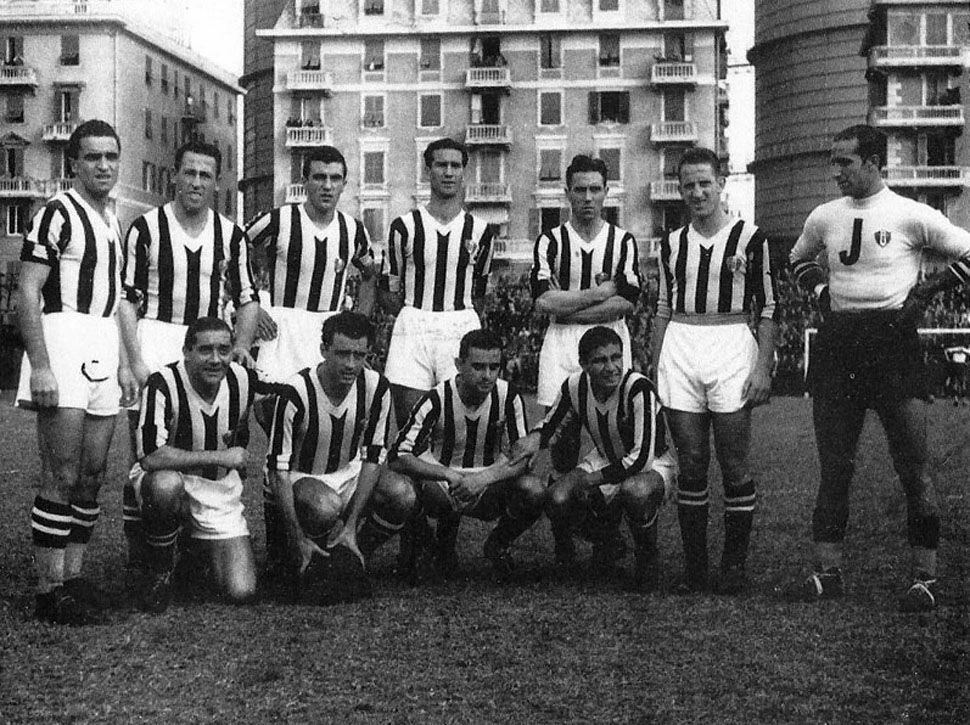
- Savino Bellini (front row, second from left) as part of Juventus in 1942

Personal information
- Date of birth: 1 December 1913
- Place of birth: Portomaggiore, Italy
- Date of death: 4 November 1974 (aged 60)
- Place of death: Portomaggiore, Italy
- Height: 1.70 m (5 ft 7 in)
- Position: Midfielder

Youth career
- Portuense

Senior career*
Years	Team	Apps	(Gls)
1931–1934	Portuense		
1934–1936	SPAL	58	(28)
1936–1937	Novara	21	(6)
1937–1944	Juventus	115	(28)
1943–1944	Milan	0	(0)
1944–1945	Varese	10	(5)
1945–1946	Internazionale	7	(1)
1946–1948	SPAL	39	(6)

Managerial career
- 1955–1956: Faenza
- * Club domestic league appearances and goals

Savino Bellini (born 1 December 1913 in Portomaggiore; died 4 November 1974 in Portomaggiore) was an Italian footballer who played as a midfielder.

Overall, he played for 10 seasons in the Serie A, 8 of which were for Juventus F.C., collecting 123 appearances and 32 goals.

== Honours ==
Juventus

- Coppa Italia winner: 1937–38, 1941–42.
