= Oscar Massei =

Argentine-Italian footballer and manager

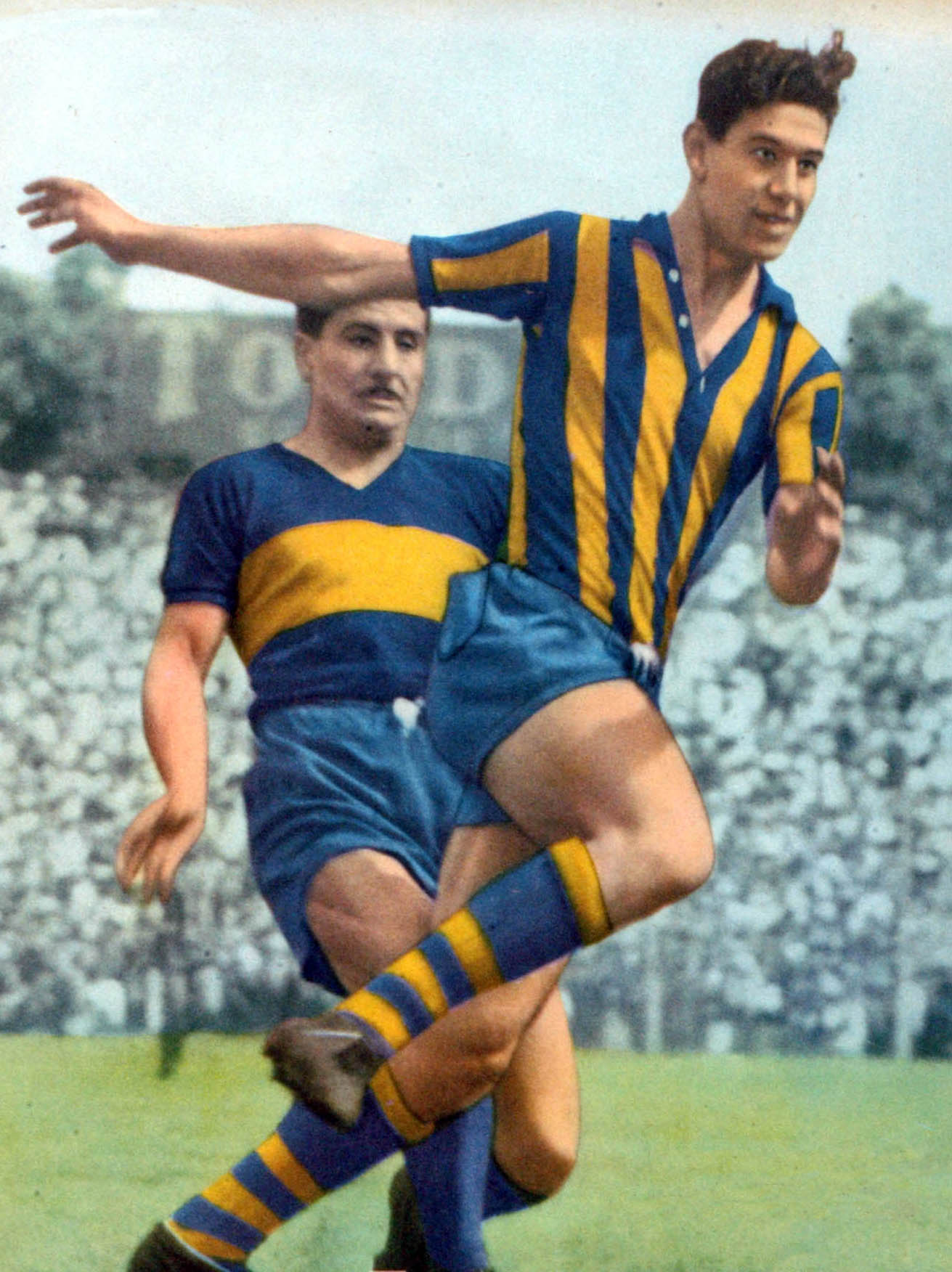

Personal information
- Full name: Oscar Alberto Massei
- Date of birth: 29 September 1934 (age 92)
- Place of birth: Pergamino, Argentina
- Height: 1.75 m (5 ft 9 in)
- Position: Midfielder

Senior career*
Years	Team	Apps	(Gls)
1952–1955	Rosario Central	88	(49)
1955–1958	Internazionale	47	(19)
1958–1959	Triestina	22	(2)
1959–1968	SPAL	244	(52)
1968–1969	Chiasso	7	(0)

Managerial career
- SPAL (youth)
- 1968–1970: Trevigliese
- 1970–1971: Treviso
- 1971–1973: Messina
- 1973–1974: Ignis Varese
- 1974–1975: Milanese
- 1975–1977: Lecco
- 1977–1979: FC Lugano
- 1979–1980: Lecco
- Pro Italia Galatina
- Pro Vercelli
- Vogherese
- * Club domestic league appearances and goals

Oscar Alberto Massei (born 29 September 1934) is an Argentine retired professional football player and coach. He also holds Italian citizenship.

== Honours ==
- Primera División Argentina top scorer: 1955 (21 goals).
