= Paolo Mazza =

Italian football manager (1901–1981)

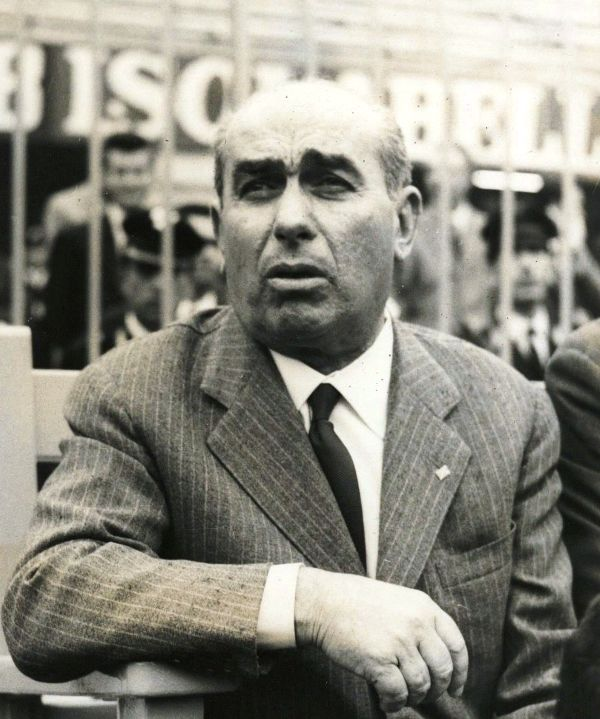
- Mazza in the 1960s

Personal information
- Date of birth: 21 July 1901
- Place of birth: Vigarano Mainarda, Italy
- Date of death: 31 December 1981 (aged 80)
- Place of death: Ferrara, Italy

Senior career*
Years	Team	Apps	(Gls)
- Portuense

Managerial career
- 1933–1936: Portuense
- 1936–1937: SPAL
- 1937–1938: Molinella
- 1938–1939: Portuense
- 1939–1942: Ferrara
- 1962: Italy
- * Club domestic league appearances and goals

Paolo Mazza (21 July 1901 – 31 December 1981) was an Italian football manager. He was co-manager of the Italy national team at the 1962 FIFA World Cup, together with Giovanni Ferrari.

Mazza's career as a footballer was served entirely in the lower divisions; he became first manager and then sporting director of SPAL, the main club in Ferrara.

In 1946, he became President of the club and pioneered the idea of training centres at youth level, opening the Centro Giovanile di Addestramento. Nicknamed Il Rabdomante (the Diviner) by journalist Gianni Brera due to his skill for talent-spotting, he helped SPAL reach Serie A, well above the level expected from such a small club.

In 1962, despite being out of management and coaching for nearly 25 years, the Italian FA asked him to act as Assistant Manager of the 1962 World Cup squad in Chile. Italy was knocked out at the first-round stage. However, just a few days after his return, he made one of his most notable signings when picking up Fabio Capello from Pieris for two million Lira (around £500).
