= 1972–73 Serie C =

Edition of football tournament

The 1972–73 Serie C was the thirty-fifth edition of Serie C, the third highest league in the Italian football league system.

== Girone A ==
Serie C Gir. A 1972-73 team distribution
Serie C Gir. B 1972-73 team distribution
Serie C Gir. B 1972-73 team distribution in Tuscany
Serie C Gir. C 1972-73 team distribution
Serie C Gir. C 1972-73 team distribution in Campania

Pos	Team	Pld	W	D	L	GF	GA	GD	Pts	Promotion or relegation
1	Parma	38	19	14	5	40	15	+25	52	Promoted to Serie B (Note: Promoted after play-off match played in Vicenza: Parma-Udinese 2-0)
2	Udinese	38	19	14	5	39	16	+23	52	
3	Alessandria	38	16	19	3	49	27	+22	51	
4	Venezia	38	19	12	7	40	24	+16	50	
5	Savona	38	16	11	11	37	30	+7	43	
6	Cremonese	38	12	18	8	32	22	+10	42	
7	Padova	38	13	15	10	35	35	0	41	
8	Seregno	38	12	16	10	28	25	+3	40	
9	Piacenza	38	10	17	11	28	27	+1	37	
10	Trento	38	10	15	13	31	37	−6	35	
11	Solbiatese	38	9	17	12	27	37	−10	35	
12	Legnano	38	9	16	13	35	35	0	34	
13	Pro Vercelli	38	11	11	16	23	27	−4	33	
14	Triestina	38	8	17	13	23	31	−8	33	
15	Belluno	38	8	17	13	30	39	−9	33	
16	Derthona	38	9	15	14	20	31	−11	33	
17	Vigevano	38	9	15	14	23	36	−13	33	
18	Rovereto	38	10	12	16	36	39	−3	32	Relegated to Serie D
19	Cossatese	38	8	15	15	29	44	−15	31	Relegated to Serie D
20	Verbania	38	5	10	23	15	43	−28	20	Relegated to Serie D

== Girone B ==
Pos	Team	Pld	W	D	L	GF	GA	GD	Pts	Promotion or relegation
1	S.P.A.L.	38	20	13	5	47	20	+27	53	Promoted to Serie B
2	Giulianova	38	18	13	7	34	16	+18	49	
3	Lucchese	38	15	18	5	42	24	+18	48	
4	Sambenedettese	38	16	15	7	41	24	+17	47	
5	Viareggio	38	11	20	7	30	21	+9	42	
6	Livorno	38	15	12	11	35	27	+8	42	
7	Modena	38	10	21	7	40	29	+11	41	
8	Rimini	38	11	19	8	28	26	+2	41	
9	Empoli	38	11	17	10	28	25	+3	39	
10	Aquila Montevarchi	38	11	17	10	27	28	−1	39	
11	Massese	38	6	25	7	32	33	−1	37	
12	Ravenna	38	10	17	11	27	32	−5	37	
13	Pisa	38	10	16	12	27	36	−9	36	
14	Spezia	38	8	18	12	27	32	−5	34	
15	Prato	38	6	20	12	24	33	−9	32	
16	Olbia	38	7	18	13	25	38	−13	32	
17	Torres	38	6	18	14	24	39	−15	30	
18	Viterbese	38	9	11	18	31	47	−16	29	Relegated to Serie D
19	Maceratese	38	7	13	18	19	38	−19	27	Relegated to Serie D
20	Anconitana	38	4	17	17	21	41	−20	25	Relegated to Serie D

== Girone C ==
Pos	Team	Pld	W	D	L	GF	GA	GD	Pts	Promotion or relegation
1	Avellino	38	28	6	4	64	18	+46	62	Promoted to Serie B
2	Lecce	38	26	7	5	65	19	+46	59	
3	Turris	38	18	10	10	43	28	+15	46	
4	Acireale	38	16	13	9	38	29	+9	45	
5	Salernitana	38	14	15	9	39	30	+9	43	
6	Chieti	38	14	14	10	40	33	+7	42	
7	Juve Stabia	38	14	14	10	42	37	+5	42	
8	Casertana	38	14	12	12	44	36	+8	40	
9	Siracusa	38	15	8	15	37	38	−1	38	
10	Frosinone	38	12	13	13	39	37	+2	37	
11	Trapani	38	15	7	16	33	41	−8	37	
12	Sorrento	38	10	16	12	32	32	0	36	
13	Pro Vasto	38	9	18	11	23	28	−5	36	
14	Cosenza	38	12	10	16	39	45	−6	34	
15	Barletta	38	11	11	16	47	46	+1	33	
16	Matera	38	10	12	16	42	50	−8	32	
17	Crotone	38	10	12	16	34	47	−13	32	
18	Messina	38	11	9	18	31	38	−7	31	Relegated to Serie D
19	Trani	38	8	10	20	26	54	−28	26	Relegated to Serie D
20	Potenza	38	2	5	31	19	91	−72	9	Relegated to Serie D

== References and sources ==
- Almanacco Illustrato del Calcio – La Storia 1898–2004, Panini Edizioni, Modena, September 2005
