= 1950–51 Serie B =

Italian football league season

Serie B
- Season: 1950–51
- Champions: SPAL; 1st title

Serie B 1950-51 team distribution

The Serie B 1950–51 was the nineteenth tournament of this competition played in Italy since its creation.

== Teams ==
Seregno, Treviso, Ancona and Messina had been promoted from Serie C, while Bari and Venezia had been relegated from Serie A.

== Events ==
A provisional fifth relegation was added to reduce the league.

== Final classification ==
Pos	Team	Pld	W	D	L	GF	GA	GR	Pts	Promotion or relegation
1	S.P.A.L. (P, C)	40	25	8	7	74	37	2.000	58	Promotion to Serie A
2	Legnano (P)	40	24	6	10	89	47	1.894	54	Promotion to Serie A
3	Modena	40	17	13	10	73	49	1.490	47	
3	Livorno	40	19	9	12	67	53	1.264	47	
5	Siracusa	40	18	8	14	62	47	1.319	44	
6	Fanfulla	40	18	6	16	69	61	1.131	42	
6	Catania	40	17	8	15	63	63	1.000	42	
6	Venezia	40	15	12	13	62	65	0.954	42	
9	Brescia	40	18	5	17	69	49	1.408	41	
9	Verona	40	16	9	15	69	58	1.190	41	
9	Vicenza	40	17	7	16	65	58	1.121	41	
9	Pisa	40	16	9	15	46	50	0.920	41	
13	Reggiana	40	15	10	15	48	53	0.906	40	
13	Salernitana	40	15	10	15	57	65	0.877	40	
15	Messina	40	16	7	17	50	48	1.042	39	
15	Treviso	40	15	9	16	56	55	1.018	39	
17	Spezia (R)	40	14	8	18	44	61	0.721	36	Relegation to Serie C
18	Bari (R)	40	9	13	18	51	75	0.680	31	Relegation to Serie C
19	Seregno (R)	40	10	10	20	42	67	0.627	30	Relegation to Serie C
20	Cremonese (R)	40	8	12	20	36	68	0.529	28	Relegation to Serie C
21	Anconitana (R)	40	4	9	27	32	95	0.337	17	Relegation to Serie C

Source: Panini
(C) Champions; (P) Promoted; (R) Relegated

== Results ==
Home \ Away	ANC	BAR	BRE	CTN	CRE	FAN	LEG	LIV	MES	MOD	PIS	REA	SAL	SER	SIR	SPA	SPE	TRV	VEN	HEL	VIC
Anconitana		2–2	1–1	3–2	0–1	0–2	0–0	1–3	1–1	0–1	1–0	1–2	1–4	2–1	2–4	2–3	1–2	0–0	0–1	1–2	2–2
Bari	3–1		3–5	2–2	3–2	0–1	2–2	3–1	3–1	0–0	0–0	0–0	2–1	2–2	1–1	0–0	1–1	3–2	1–2	0–1	2–1
Brescia	12–0	4–0		2–1	3–0	4–1	0–1	1–1	3–1	2–0	3–1	3–1	1–0	2–0	0–0	0–0	1–0	1–0	2–0	3–1	0–2
Catania	2–1	2–0	1–0		1–1	1–0	3–0	2–1	1–2	2–1	3–2	3–0	3–1	2–0	3–1	1–4	2–1	1–0	3–1	1–1	1–3
Cremonese	1–1	5–2	1–1	1–0		0–0	1–1	0–1	1–0	0–4	2–2	4–1	2–1	0–0	0–1	1–2	1–0	1–2	3–3	1–1	2–0
Fanfulla	3–0	1–1	2–1	4–3	3–0		5–2	1–3	1–0	3–0	3–0	2–0	1–1	4–0	2–0	2–3	2–3	1–0	7–2	3–2	2–1
Legnano	5–0	2–0	2–0	5–0	6–1	5–1		3–1	1–0	2–0	1–0	3–2	2–0	7–0	2–1	1–0	5–0	8–2	2–2	6–4	4–2
Livorno	2–1	1–0	4–0	2–2	1–1	2–1	1–0		2–1	2–2	0–0	4–1	2–0	2–0	5–1	1–2	1–0	3–1	2–0	2–1	1–2
Messina	0–1	0–1	4–1	1–1	2–0	0–1	2–0	4–1		1–1	0–0	2–1	2–1	1–0	4–1	1–1	4–1	1–1	1–0	0–0	1–3
Modena	4–0	6–3	2–1	3–3	5–0	2–1	0–1	0–0	2–0		3–0	0–0	1–1	4–0	2–0	1–1	6–0	3–3	0–0	2–1	2–1
Pisa	2–0	5–3	1–0	2–2	1–0	3–0	1–2	0–3	0–1	2–1		1–0	2–2	1–0	1–0	1–0	2–0	1–0	0–0	5–0	1–1
Reggiana	2–0	1–1	2–1	2–0	2–0	1–1	2–0	2–0	2–1	1–2	2–0		2–0	0–0	1–0	2–0	1–1	1–1	5–2	2–1	0–1
Salernitana	0–0	1–0	0–4	1–0	0–0	3–3	3–2	4–2	0–3	4–2	4–1	1–1		3–1	0–0	1–0	2–1	2–1	3–2	3–2	2–1
Seregno	3–1	2–1	3–1	2–0	3–0	3–1	2–1	1–1	2–3	2–0	1–2	1–2	0–1		1–1	5–2	1–1	0–1	0–0	1–1	1–0
Siracusa	3–1	6–0	2–0	2–0	1–0	4–1	2–0	2–1	2–0	4–0	1–0	2–0	2–2	2–2		1–1	3–1	3–0	2–2	1–0	2–1
SPAL	2–0	2–1	2–1	4–0	4–1	2–2	2–1	3–0	3–1	0–0	3–0	3–0	2–1	4–0	2–0		1–1	2–1	3–0	1–0	2–1
Spezia	1–0	1–0	1–0	0–1	1–0	1–0	3–0	3–2	0–1	1–1	0–3	3–1	1–1	1–1	1–0	0–3		3–0	5–0	1–0	0–3
Treviso	7–0	1–1	3–1	3–2	3–1	1–0	0–1	0–2	0–1	0–3	2–0	0–0	2–0	3–0	2–1	2–0	4–2		2–0	0–0	1–1
Venezia	2–2	2–0	1–3	2–1	4–1	2–1	0–0	2–2	4–2	3–2	1–1	5–1	3–1	3–0	1–0	0–1	1–1	2–0		2–1	4–0
Hellas Verona	4–2	4–2	1–0	1–1	2–0	3–0	1–2	4–1	3–0	2–2	4–0	1–0	6–1	2–1	3–2	1–4	1–0	1–1	1–1		4–1
Vicenza	3–0	1–2	3–1	1–4	0–0	2–0	1–1	1–1	1–0	2–3	1–2	2–2	2–1	2–0	2–1	3–0	4–1	2–4	3–0	2–1	

Source: Almanacco Illustrato del Calcio - La Storia 1898-2004, Panini Edizioni, Modena, September 2005 (in Italian)
Legend: Blue = home team win; Yellow = draw; Red = away team win.

== References and sources ==
- Almanacco Illustrato del Calcio - La Storia 1898-2004, Panini Edizioni, Modena, September 2005

== See also ==
- 1950–51 Serie A
