= Associazione Sportiva Portuense =

Football club in Portomaggiore, Italy

A.S.D. Portuense Etrusca
- Founded: 1928
- Ground: Stadio Savino Bellini, Portomaggiore, Italy
- Capacity: 2,500
- Chairman: Antonio Cavallari
- Manager: Alessando Baiesi
- League: Promozione Emilia-Romagna Group C
- 2023–24: Promozione Emilia-Romagna Group C, 4th
Home colours	Away colours

A.S.D. Portuense Etrusca (formerly A.S.D. Portuense) is an amateur Italian football club, based in Portomaggiore, Emilia-Romagna.The club is currently playing in Promozione Emilia-Romagna Group C.

On June 10, 2020, Portuense and A.S.D. Etrusca Calcio 2010, a youth club from Voghiera, merged, becoming Portuense Etrusca.

== Notable former players ==
- Paolo Mazza
- Ruben Buriani
- Savino Bellini
- Rino Micheli
- Arnaldo Taddei
- Silvio "Oberdan" Orlandi
- Giulio Boldrini
- Lidio Maietti
- Serafino Montanari
- Nello Orlandi
