= Ars et Labor Ferrara Calcio =

Italian association football club based in Ferrara, Emilia-Romagna

Ars et Labor Ferrara
- Full name: Ars et Labor Ferrara
- Nicknames: I Biancazzurri (The White-and-Blues); Gli Estensi (The House of Este)
- Founded: March 1907; 119 years ago as Circolo Ars et Labor; 2005; 21 years ago (as SPAL 1907); 2012; 14 years ago (refounded); 2025; 1 year ago (refounded)
- Stadium: Stadio Paolo Mazza
- Capacity: 16,134
- Owner: JP Football Holdings Limited
- President: Joseph Portelli
- Head coach: Stefano Di Benedetto
- League: Eccellenza Emilia-Romagna
- 2025–26: Eccellenza Emilia B, 2nd of 18
- Website: www.ferraracalcio.it
Home colours	Away colours

Ars et Labor Ferrara, (Note: Italian pronunciation: [ˈars ɛt ˈlaːbor ferˈraːra]) formerly Società Polisportiva Ars et Labor, (Note: Italian pronunciation: [sotʃeˈta polisporˈtiːva ˈars ɛt ˈlaːbor]) known for its former acronym S.P.A.L., (Note: Italian pronunciation: [spal]) is a football club based in Ferrara, Emilia-Romagna, Italy.

The first city’s club appeared in 1907. Since 1928 they have played their home matches at Stadio Paolo Mazza, named after Paolo Mazza (chairman of the club between 1946 and 1977).

In total, SPAL have participated in 24 top-tier, 28 second-tier, 43 third-tier, 7 fourth-tier and 1 fifth-tier league seasons. The club's best finish was when they came fifth in the 1959–60 Serie A; they also reached the 1961–62 Coppa Italia final.

The club was chaired by the American lawyer and businessman Joe Tacopina and the manager was Francesco Baldini until the 2025 liquidation, after which the team's legacy is carried on by Ars et Labor Ferrara.

== History ==
=== From foundation to World War II ===
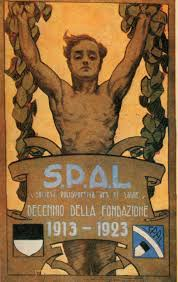
Poster celebrating 10 years since the foundation of SPAL

The club was founded in March 1907 as Circolo Ars et Labor (Latin for Art and Work Club) by the Salesian priest Pietro Acerbis. In the early stages, it was mainly a cultural and religious association, then in 1913 it became a multi-sports company, taking the name of Società Polisportiva Ars et Labor (a mixture of Italian and Latin meaning Sports Club Society of Art and Work). The team began its professional activity under the aegis of the Italian Football Federation (Federazione Italiana Giuoco Calcio) in 1919, competing in the second-tier tournament.

SPAL played in the top flight league from 1920 to 1925, reaching the qualification playoff for the National Finals in 1921–22. From 1925 until the Second World War, they played in Serie B and Serie C: in this period, the club's all-time top striker Mario Romani scored 130 goals in 189 games during two different periods with the white-blues (1925–32 and 1937–38).

Between 1939 and 1943 the club temporarily changed its name to Associazione Calcio Ferrara, wearing the black and white colours of the city. After the suspension of the championships due to war, in 1945 the club returned to the name SPAL and to the light blue and white kits.

=== The golden period in Serie A ===
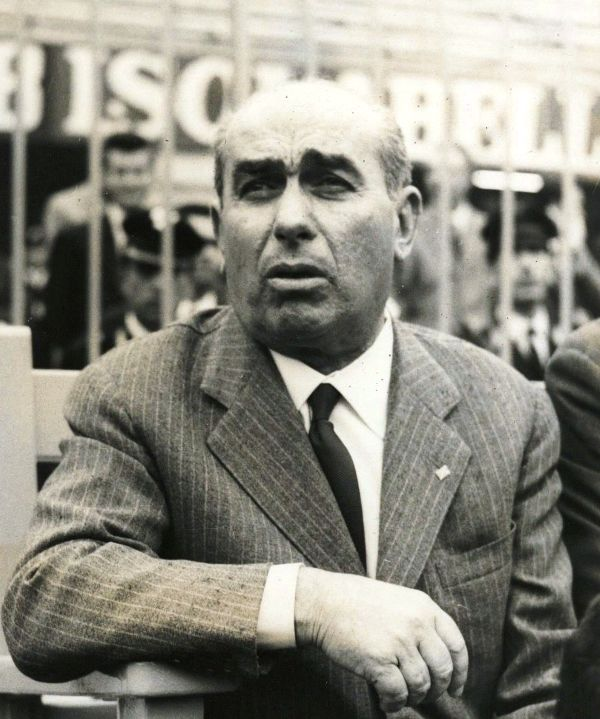
Paolo Mazza, chairman of SPAL from 1946 to 1977

In 1946 Paolo Mazza became chairman of the club. After five consecutive seasons in Serie B, SPAL won promotion to Serie A after finishing the championship first in 1950–51. The white-blues subsequently stayed in the top division for most of the 1950s and 1960s, competing in 16 out of 17 Serie A seasons from 1951 to 1968.

SPAL finished fifth in 1959–60, thus obtaining the best placement in its history. Also, in 1961–62 they played in the Coppa Italia final, losing against Napoli. In the early stages of 1962–63 season, in which the club finished in eighth place, the white and blues reached the top of the league table. During those years, the club was a launchpad for many young players, among them Fabio Capello.

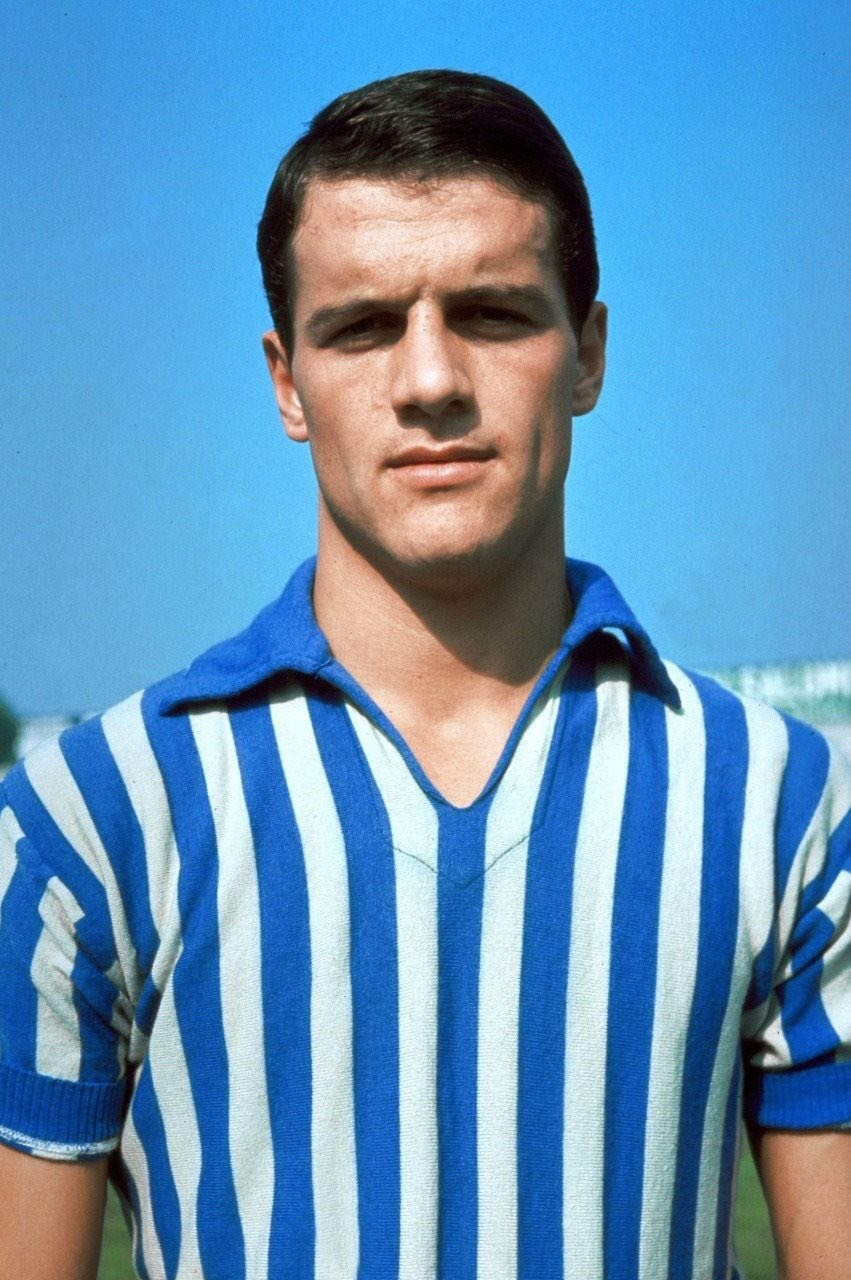
Fabio Capello at SPAL in 1966

In 1963–64 they were relegated to Serie B, but they came back to Serie A after only one year, and remained in the top division until 1968. At the end of the last season in the top flight, SPAL won the Cup of Italian-Swiss Friendship.

=== From 1970s to 21st century ===
During 1970s, 1980s and 1990s SPAL played mostly in Serie B and Serie C/C1.

Paolo Mazza quit the presidency in December 1976 and was replaced by Primo Mazzanti. The former chairman died in December 1981 and three months later Ferrara's Stadio Comunale was named after him.

In 1990, Giovanni Donigaglia became chairman of the club: between 1990 and 1992 SPAL obtained back-to-back promotions from Serie C2 to Serie B, under the management of Giovan Battista Fabbri. Donigaglia left the presidency in 2002 with the squad in Serie C1. He was replaced by Lino di Nardo.

=== Recent years ===
The club went bankrupt in 2005, and were reformed as SPAL 1907, under the terms of Article 52 of N.O.I.F. In the summer of 2012, after suffering a second bankruptcy, the club was refounded for the second time as Real SPAL and would begin life in Serie D under the same N.O.I.F. article.

At the end of the 2012–13 season the club took back its original name. Giacomense, a club founded in 1967 at Masi San Giacomo, a frazione of Masi Torello, had moved to the city of Ferrara; on 12 July 2013, owner Roberto Benasciutti made a deal with the Colombarini family for a merger between SPAL and Giacomense, with the latter giving its sports title to SPAL and continuing to play in Ferrara. The club initially adopted the name S.P.A.L. 2013, in order to continue the football history of the whiteblues, then they took back the original denomination of S.P.A.L.. Walter Mattioli became president, with Simone and Francesco Colombarini as main shareholders.

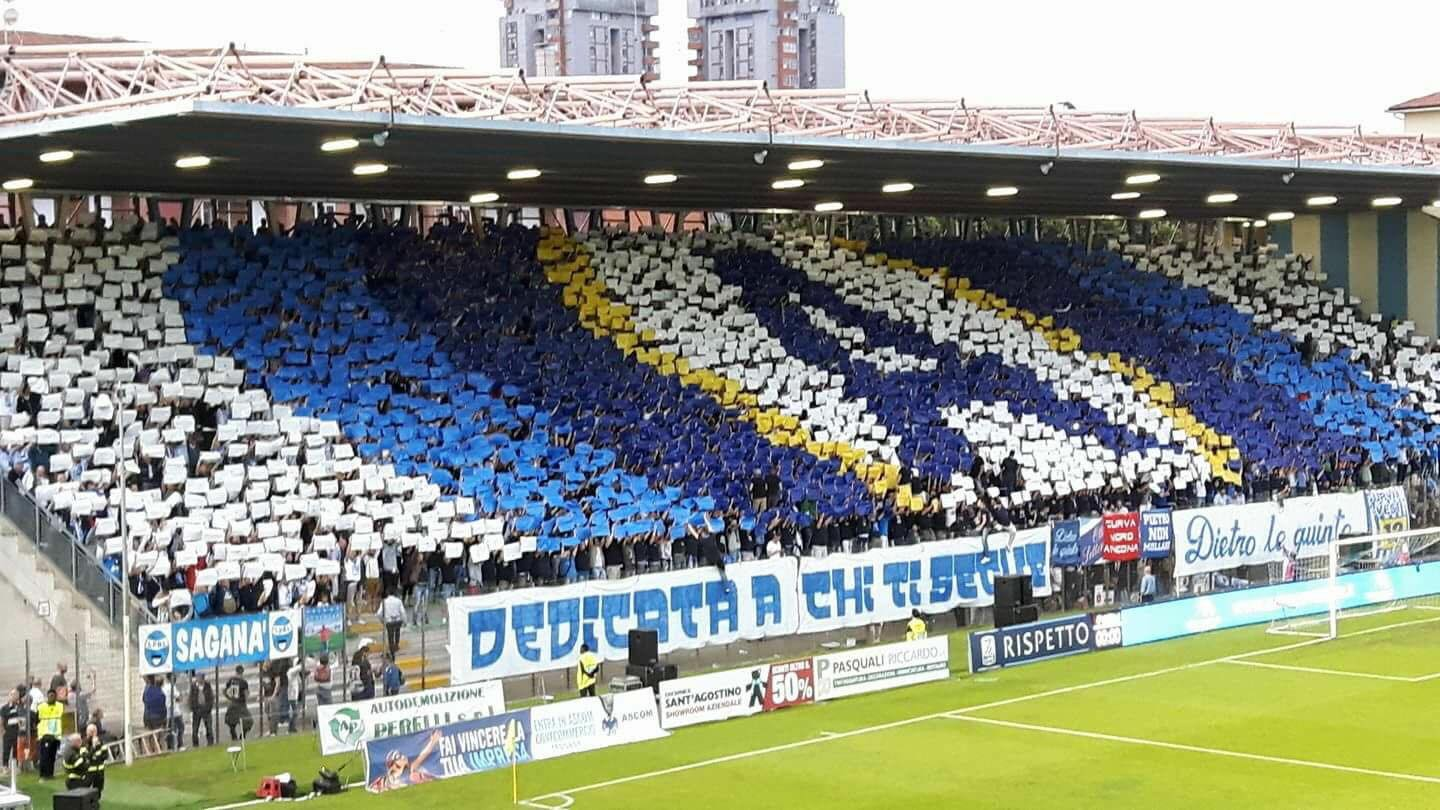
Whiteblues supporters at stadio Paolo Mazza celebrating promotion to Serie A on 18 May 2017

They finished the 2013–14 Lega Pro Seconda Divisione season in sixth place, thus qualifying for the inaugural unified 2014–15 Lega Pro season. In 2015–16, the squad won promotion to Serie B for the first time since the 1992–93 season, after finishing first in group B of the Lega Pro. The following year they came first in Serie B, thus obtaining promotion to Serie A after a 49-year absence. In their first season back in Serie A, SPAL avoided relegation by finishing in 17th place. At the end of the 2018–19 season they confirmed their presence in the top flight for a third consecutive year, finishing 13th. The club had mixed fortunes in the 2019–20 season and, after gaining just 15 points in 23 games, coach Leonardo Semplici was dismissed in February 2020, replaced by Luigi Di Biagio. SPAL were relegated to Serie B, finishing in last place with 20 points. The club reached the 2020–21 Coppa Italia quarter-finals, becoming the only team from Serie B to advance to that stage in the competition.

In August 2021, the club was acquired by the American lawyer and businessman Joe Tacopina. Some media say that the real owners behind Mr. Tacopina are brothers Alessandro Bazzoni and Lorenzo Bazzoni, Italian businessmen presumed to be linked with the government of Nicolas Maduro. SPAL was relegated to Serie C at the end of the 2022–23 season. On 2 January 2024, Tacopina revealed the name of the new co-owner of the club, American broker and businessman Marcello Follano, with whom he founded a new parent company controlling SPAL, Tacollano Holdings LLC. However, on 7 June 2025, SPAL announced that it would not participate in the 2025–26 Serie C season, due to ongoing financial strain and the inability to attract new investors, despite having injected around €50 million into the club over the past four years. SPAL eventually went into liquidation although a new club Ars et Labor Ferrara was founded, for the 2025/2026 season playing in the Eccellenza Emilia-Romagna (fifth tier) league.

== Colours, badge and nicknames ==
The team's colours are light blue and white, which derive from the Salesians' emblem. The home kit, since 1962, has been composed of a vertical striped light blue-white shirt, white trainers and white socks. The only exception to light blue and white was when the club adopted a black and white kit between 1939 and 1943 (when it was named A.C. Ferrara), in honour of Ferrara's civic colours.

The team's badge features an oval-shaped light blue escutcheon, with a white band in the upper section, on which is written the acronym S.P.A.L. in golden characters. Also, in the lower section, the black and white emblem of the city is featured. From 1980 until 1995, the official badge featured a fawn, another symbol of the club.

SPAL's most common nicknames are Biancazzurri (from the club colours, light blue and white) and Estensi (from the House of Este, ancient European noble dynasty that ruled Ferrara from 1264 to 1598).

== Stadium ==
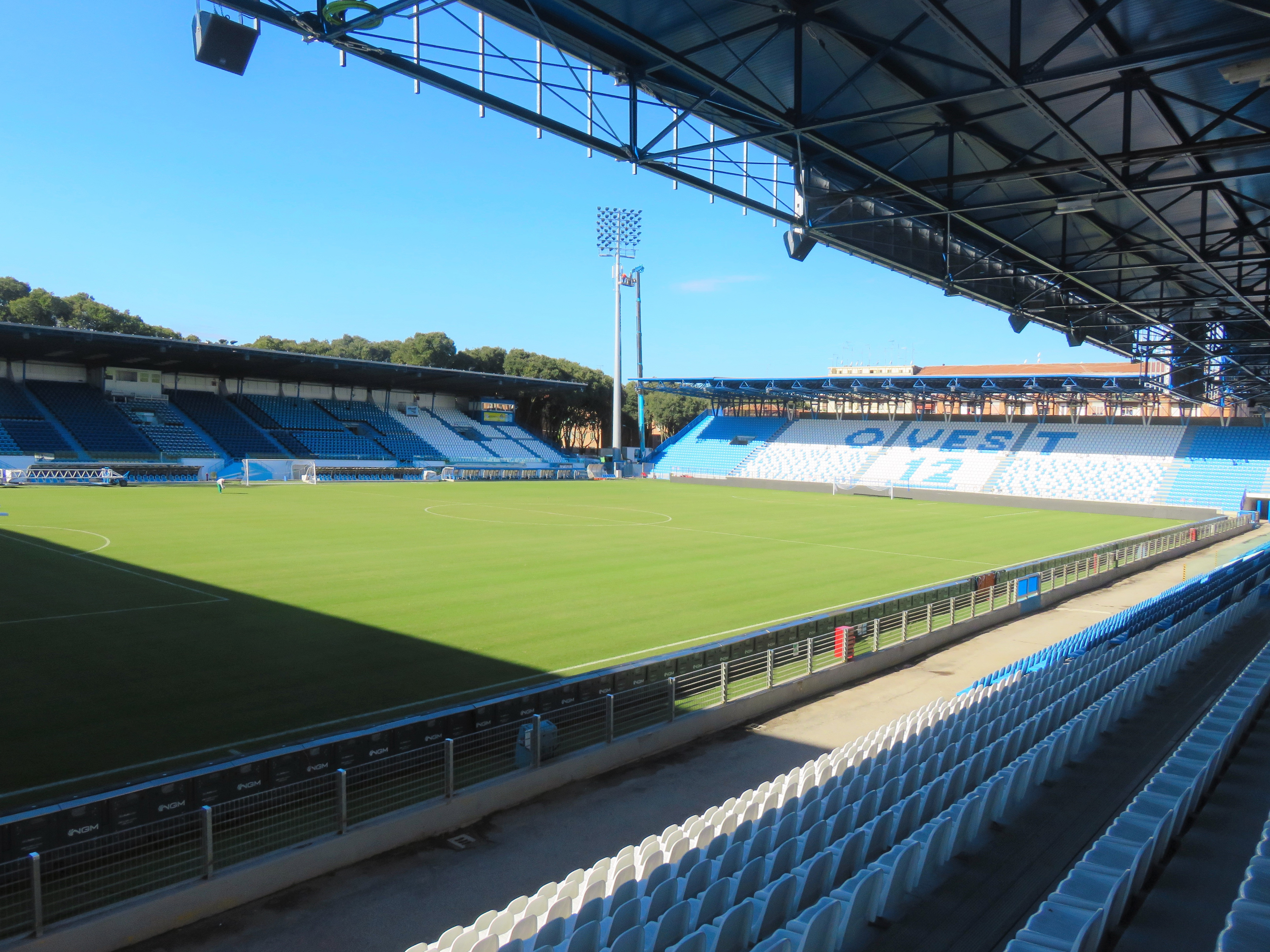
Internal view of the stadium in 2018

- Campo di Piazza d'Armi (1919–28)
- Stadio Paolo Mazza (1928–)

The current home ground of SPAL is the 16,134 seater Stadio Paolo Mazza. The stadium was opened in September 1928 as Stadio Comunale, then took on its current name in February 1982, in honour of the former president of the club Paolo Mazza, who died two months earlier.

Initially it had a capacity of 4,000. Then, in concomitance with the promotion of SPAL to Serie A, in 1951 it was subjected to a heavy restructuring that brought capacity to 25,000. Between 1960s and 1980s it was renovated again, reducing the number of possible spectators to 22,000 until the mid-2000s.

From 2005 to 2016 the stadium capacity was limited to 7,500 due to safety reasons and cost containment. In 2016–17, after the club's promotion to Serie B and then to Serie A, the stadium was restructured again to match the modern needs of comfort and safety. In the summer of 2018 a further remodeling took place, in order to bring the total capacity from 13,135 seats to 16,134.

== Sponsors ==
=== Kit sponsors ===
- 1981–86: Adidas
- 1986–87: Meyba
- 1987–89: Fitness
- 1989–91: WBS
- 1991–04: Asics
- 2004–05: Zeus
- 2005–09: Legea
- 2009–10: Asics
- 2010–12: Givova
- 2012–13: Legea
- 2013–16: Erreà
- 2016–17: HS Football
- 2017–25: Macron*
- 2025–present: Erreà

== Players ==
=== Captains ===
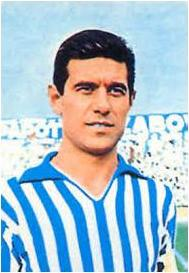
Argentinian midfielder Oscar Massei was awarded honorary citizenship by the city of Ferrara in 2007, as one of the most representative players in club's history

Below a chronological list of SPAL captains since 1950.

Name	Years	Name	Years
(Italy) Giovanni Emiliani	1950–53	(Italy) Marcello Castoldi	1953–54
(Italy) Edoardo Dal Pos	1954–59	(Argentina) Oscar Massei	1959–61
(Italy) Sergio Cervato	1961–65	(Argentina) Oscar Massei	1965–68
(Italy) Carlo Dell'Omodarme	1968–69	(Italy) Enrico Cairoli	Jul. 1969–Oct. 1973
(Italy) Lucio Mongardi	Oct. 1973–Jun. 1975	(Italy) Sergio Reggiani	1975–76
(Italy) Ottavio Bianchi	1976–77	(Italy) Franco Pezzato	1977–79
(Italy) Mauro Gibellini	1979–81	(Italy) Rosario Rampanti	1981–82
(Italy) Mirco Brilli	1982–83	(Italy) Giuseppe De Gradi	1983–85
(Italy) Elio Gustinetti	1985–86	(Italy) Fabio Perinelli	1986–87
(Italy) Arturo Vianello	1987–88	(Italy) Massimo Pellegrini	1988–89
(Italy) Francesco Cini	1989–90	(Italy) Franco Fabbri	1990–91
(Italy) Giuseppe Brescia	1991–93	(Italy) Andrea Mangoni	1993–94
(Italy) Giuseppe Brescia	1994–96	(Italy) Eugenio Sgarbossa	1996–97
(Italy) Fausto Pari	1997–98	(Italy) Alfonso Greco	1998–99
(Italy) Massimo Gadda	1999–00	(Italy) Emanuele Cancellato	Jul. 2000–Jan. 2002
(Italy) Cristian Servidei	Jan. 2002–Jun. 2002	(Italy) Francesco Zanoncelli	2002–03
(Italy) Manuel Milana	2003–06	(Switzerland) David Sesa	2006–08
(Italy) Luis Fernando Centi	Jul. 2008–Feb. 2009	(Italy) Marco Zamboni	Feb. 2009–Jun. 2012
(Italy) Davide Marchini	2012–13	(Italy) Massimiliano Varricchio	2013–14
(Italy) Nicolas Giani	2014–17	(Italy) Luca Mora	Jul. 2017–Jan. 2018
(Italy) Mirco Antenucci	Jan. 2018–Jun. 2019	(Italy) Sergio Floccari	2019–21
(Italy) Francesco Vicari	2021–22	(Italy) Salvatore Esposito	Jul. 2022–Jan. 2023
(Italy) Lorenzo Dickmann	Jan. 2023–Jun.2023	(Italy) Mirco Antenucci	2023–25

== Technical staff ==
Position	Staff
Head of technical staff	(Italy) Alex Casella
Head coach	(Italy) Francesco Baldini
Deputy head coach	(Italy) Luciano Mularoni
Technical assistant	(Italy) Claiton Machado
Technical assistant	(Italy) Emanuele Dogliani
Technical assistant	(Italy) Riccardo Leardi
Match analyst	(Italy) Mario Enrico Braco
Goalkeeping coach	(Italy) Davide Bertaccini
Fitness coach	(Italy) Diego Gemignani
Injury recovery	(Italy) Carlo Oliani
Team manager	(Italy) Alessio Cirulli
Head of medical staff	(Italy) Fabrizio Aggio
Physiotherapist	(Italy) Marcello Bertolani
Physiotherapist	(Italy) Piero Bortolin
Physiotherapist	(Italy) Daniele Zannini

== Chairmen history ==
SPAL have had several presidents (chairmen) (Italian: presidenti, lit. 'presidents' or Italian: presidenti del consiglio di amministrazione, lit. 'chairmen of the board of directors') over the course of their history. Some of them have been the main shareholder of the club. The longest-serving is Paolo Mazza.

Name	Years	Name	Years
(Italy) Don Pietro Acerbis	1907–11	(Italy) Conte Buosi	1911–12
(Italy) Aminta Gulinati	1912–15	(Italy) Antonio Santini	1919–21
(Italy) Enrico Bassani	1921–24	(Italy) Gaetano Ridolfi	1924–27
(Italy) Giannino Bonfiglioli	1927–28	(Italy) On. Ferri	1928–31
(Italy) Giuseppe Turbiani (Italy) Carlo Osti	1931–32	(Italy) Comm. Gandini	1932–33
(Italy) Umberto Barbè (Italy) Giulio Divisi	1933–34	(Italy) Luigi Orsi	1934–35
(Italy) Giovanni Argazzi	1935–36	(Italy) Nino Fiorini	1936–37
(Italy) Angelo Vissoli	1937–39	(Italy) Annio Bignardi	1939–41
(Italy) Augusto Caniato	1941–43	(Italy) Edmondo Bucci	1945–46
(Italy) Paolo Mazza	1946–77	(Italy) Primo Mazzanti	1977–85
(Italy) Giorgio Rossatti	1985–86	(Italy) Francesco Nicolini	1986–89
(Italy) Albersano Ravani	1989–90	(Italy) Giovanni Donigaglia	1990–96
(Italy) Vanni Guzzinati	1996–97	(Italy) Giovanni Donigaglia	1997–02
(Italy) Lino Di Nardo	2002–05	(Italy) Gianfranco Tomasi	2005–08
(Italy) Cesare Butelli	2008–12	(Italy) Roberto Ranzani	2012–13
(Italy) Walter Mattioli	2013–21	(United States) Joe Tacopina	2021–25
(United States) Joe Tacopina	2021-25	(Malta) Joseph Portelli	2026-

== Managerial history ==
SPAL have had many managers and head coaches throughout their history, below is a chronological list of them.

Name	Years	Name	Years
(Italy) Carlo Marchiandi	1919–22	(Hungary) Armand Halmos	1922–23
(Italy) Giuseppe Ticozzelli	1923–24	(Czech Republic) Walter Alt	1924–27
(Italy) Carlo Osti (Italy) Carlo Marchiandi	1927–28	(Hungary) Béla Károly	1928–29
(Hungary) György Hlavay	1929–31	(Italy) Francesco Mattuteia (Italy) Adolf Mora Murer	1931–32
(Czech Republic) Walter Alt	1933–34	(Czech Republic) Mihály Balacics	1934–35
(Hungary) György Hlavay (Italy) Guido Testolina	1935–36	(Italy) Paolo Mazza	1936–37
(Italy) Euro Riparbelli	1937–39	(Italy) Paolo Mazza	1939–42
(Italy) Giorgio Armari (Italy) Bruno Maini	1942–43	(Hungary) József Viola	Jul. 1945–Jun. 1946
(Italy) Guido Testolina	Jul. 1946–Jun. 1947	(Italy) Giuseppe Marchi	Jul. 1947–Jun. 1948
(Italy) Bruno Vale	Jul. 1948–Jun. 1949	(Italy) Antonio Janni	Jul. 1949–Jun. 1954
(Italy) Bruno Biagini	Jul. 1954–Jun. 1955	(Italy) Fioravante Baldi	Jul. 1955–Jun. 1956
(Italy) Paolo Tabanelli	Jul. 1956–Jun. 1958	(Italy) Fioravante Baldi	Jul. 1958–Apr. 1960
(Italy) Serafino Montanari	Apr. 1960–Jun. 1960	(Italy) Luigi Ferrero	Jul. 1960–Sep. 1961
(Italy) Serafino Montanari	Sep. 1961–Apr. 1963	(Italy) Aurelio Marchese	Apr. 1963–Jun. 1963
(Italy) Giacomo Blason	Jul. 1963–Apr. 1964	(Italy) Giovan Battista Fabbri	Apr. 1964–Nov. 1964
(Italy) Francesco Petagna	Nov. 1964–Oct. 1968	(Italy) Serafino Montanari	Oct. 1968–May 1969
(Italy) Giovan Battista Fabbri	May 1969–Oct. 1969	(Italy) Tito Corsi	Oct. 1969–Jun. 1970
(Italy) Cesare Meucci	Jul. 1970–Jun. 1972	(Italy) Eugenio Fantini	Jul. 1972–Oct. 1972
(Italy) Mario Caciagli	Oct. 1972–Jan. 1975	(Italy) Guido Capello	Jan. 1975–Jun. 1975
(Italy) Francesco Petagna	Jul. 1975–Dec. 1975	(Italy) Umberto Pinardi	Dec. 1975–Feb. 1976
(Italy) Guido Capello	Feb. 1976–Nov. 1976	(Italy) Giovanni Ballico	Nov. 1976–Dec. 1976
(Italy) Ottavio Bugatti	Dec. 1976–Feb. 1977	(Spain) Luis Suárez	Feb. 1977–Jun. 1977
(Italy) Mario Caciagli	Jul. 1977–Jun. 1980	(Italy) Battista Rota	Jul. 1980–Mar. 1982
(Italy) Ugo Tomeazzi	Mar. 1982–Jun. 1982	(Italy) Gaetano Salvemini	Jul. 1982–Dec. 1982
(Italy) Giovanni Seghedoni	Dec. 1982–Jun. 1983	(Italy) Giovanni Galeone	Jul. 1983–Oct. 1984
(Italy) Giancarlo Danova	Oct. 1984–Dec. 1984	(Italy) Giovanni Galeone	Dec. 1984–Jun. 1986
(Italy) Ferruccio Mazzola	Jul. 1986–Jun. 1987	(Italy) Giancarlo Cella	Jul. 1987–Nov. 1987
(Italy) Giovan Battista Fabbri	Nov. 1987–Jun. 1988	(Italy) Giorgio Veneri	Jul. 1988–Dec. 1988
(Italy) Francesco Paolo Specchia	Dec. 1988–Jun. 1989	(Italy) Luciano Magistrelli	Jul. 1989–Jan. 1990
(Italy) Nello Santin	Jan. 1990–Jun. 1990	(Italy) Paolo Lombardo	Jul. 1990–Feb. 1991
(Italy) Giovan Battista Fabbri	Feb. 1991–Oct. 1992	(Italy) Rino Marchesi	Oct. 1992–Apr. 1993
(Italy) Giovan Battista Fabbri	Apr. 1993–Jun. 1993	(Italy) Gian Cesare Discepoli	Jul. 1993–Jan. 1995
(Italy) Vincenzo Guerini	Jan. 1995–Sep. 1995	(Italy) Salvatore Bianchetti	Sep. 1995–Feb. 1997
(Italy) Alfredo Magni	Feb. 1997–Jun. 1997	(Italy) Gianni De Biasi	Jul. 1997–Jun. 1999
(Italy) Giancarlo D'Astoli	Jul. 1999–Jun. 2000	(Italy) Alessandro Scanziani	Jul. 2000–Nov. 2000
(Italy) Mauro Melotti	Nov. 2000–Nov. 2001	(Italy) Fabio Perinelli	Nov. 2001–Mar. 2002
(Italy) Mauro Melotti	Mar. 2002–Jun. 2002	(Italy) Walter De Vecchi	Jul. 2002–Oct. 2002
(Italy) Giuliano Sonzogni	Oct. 2002–Oct. 2003	(Italy) Gian Cesare Discepoli	Oct. 2003–Jun. 2004
(Italy) Massimiliano Allegri	Jul. 2004–Jun. 2005	(Italy) Paolo Beruatto	Jul. 2005–Feb. 2006
(Italy) Walter Nicoletti	Feb. 2006–Jun. 2006	(Italy) Leonardo Rossi	Jul. 2006–Jun. 2007
(Italy) Francesco Buglio	Jul. 2007–Feb. 2008	(Italy) Roberto Labardi	Feb. 2008
(Italy) Angelo Alessio	Feb. 2008–Jun. 2008	(Italy) Aldo Dolcetti	Jul. 2008–Nov. 2009
(Italy) Egidio Notaristefano	Nov. 2009–Feb. 2011	(Italy) Gian Marco Remondina	Feb. 2011–Jun. 2011
(Italy) Stefano Vecchi	Jul. 2011–Jun. 2012	(Italy) David Sassarini	Jul. 2012–Jun. 2013
(Italy) Leonardo Rossi	Jul. 2013–Oct. 2013	(Italy) Massimo Gadda	Oct. 2013–Jun. 2014
(Italy) Oscar Brevi	Jul. 2014–Dec. 2014	(Italy) Leonardo Semplici	Dec. 2014–Feb. 2020
(Italy) Luigi Di Biagio	Feb. 2020–Aug. 2020	(Italy) Pasquale Marino	Aug. 2020–Mar. 2021
(Italy) Massimo Rastelli	Mar. 2021–Jun. 2021	(Spain) Pep Clotet	Jul. 2021–Jan. 2022
(Italy) Roberto Venturato	Jan. 2022–Oct. 2022	(Italy) Daniele De Rossi	Oct. 2022–Feb. 2023
(Italy) Massimo Oddo	Feb. 2023–Jun. 2023	(Italy) Domenico Di Carlo	Jul. 2023–Oct. 2023
(Italy) Leonardo Colucci	Oct. 2023–Feb. 2024	(Italy) Domenico Di Carlo	Feb. 2024–Jun. 2024
(Italy) Andrea Dossena	Jul. 2024–Feb. 2025	(Italy) Francesco Baldini	Feb. 2025–Jun. 2025
(Italy) Stefano Di Benedetto	Jul. 2025–present		

== Club records ==
=== Divisional movements ===
Below is a table showing the participation of SPAL in the Italian football leagues.

League	Series	Years	First	Last	Best result	Promotions	Relegations
A	Serie A (19); Prima Divisione	24	1920–21	2019–20	5th (1960)	-	▼4 (1925, 1964, 1968, 2020)
B	Serie B (24); Seconda Divisione	27	1925–26	2022–23	Winner (1951, 2017)	▲3 (1951, 1965, 2017)	▼8 (1928, 1936, 1939, 1969, 1977, 1982, 1993, 2023)
C	Serie C Serie C1 (38); Prima Divisione (4)	44	1928–29	2024–25	Winner (1938, 1973, 1978, 1992, 2016)	▲7 (1933, 1938, 1946, 1973, 1978, 1992, 2016)	▼3 (1989, 1997, 2005✟)
C	Serie C2 (7)	7	1989–90	2013–14	Winner (1998)	▲4 (1991, 1998, 2008, 2014)	▼2 (2012✟, 2025✟)
D	Serie D	1	2012–13	2012–13	7th (2013)	▲1 (2013)	-
E	Eccellenza	2	2025–26	2026–27	2nd (2026)	▲0	-

92 out of 95 years of professional football in Italy since 1929

✟= Relegation due to bankruptcy.

=== Individual ===
Below is a table showing the recordmen of matches played and goals scored for SPAL in the Italian football leagues.

League appearances

- 287 (Italy) Giulio Boldrini (1967–77)
- 263 (Italy) Andrea Pierobon (1997–05)
- 244 (Argentina) Oscar Massei (1959–68)
- 241 (Italy) Franco Pezzato (1964–67, 1972–76, 1977–79, 1983–84)
- 228 (Italy) Gianfranco Bozzao (1958–61, 1962–68)

228 (Italy) Giuseppe Brescia (1988–93, 1994–96)

- 210 (Italy) Aulo Gelio Lucchi (1951–59)
- 198 (Italy) Manuel Lazzari (2013–19)
- 195 (Italy) Ermelindo D'Agostini (1934–43)
- 189 (Italy) Mario Romani (1924–32, 1937–38)
- 186 (Italy) Aldo Barbieri (1925–33, 1935–36)
- 183 (Italy) Francesco Vicari (2016–22)
- 182 (Italy) Luigi Olasi (1930–37)

182 (Italy) Mauro Gibellini (1971–73, 1975–81)

- 181 (Italy) Ferdinando Donati (1970–71, 1972–74, 1976–79)
- 177 (Italy) Mirco Antenucci (2016–19, 2023–25)
- 174 (Italy) Carlo Novelli (1955–57, 1959–65)

League goals

- 129 (Italy) Mario Romani (1924–32, 1937–38)
- 92 (Italy) Aldo Barbieri (1925–33, 1935–36)
- 81 (Italy) Franco Pezzato (1964–67, 1972–76, 1977–79, 1983–84)
- 59 (Italy) Emanuele Cancellato (1997–02)
- 52 (Argentina) Oscar Massei (1959–68)
- 50 (Italy) Mirco Antenucci (2016–19, 2023–25)
- 49 (Italy) Mauro Gibellini (1971–73, 1975–81)
- 46 (Italy) Bruno Braga (1929–35)
- 43 (Italy) Girolamo Bizzarri (1993–95)
- 38 (Italy) Goffredo Colombi (1949–53)
- 36 (Italy) Carlo Novelli (1955–57, 1959–65)
- 34 (Morocco) Rachid Arma (2008–09, 2011–12)
- 33 (Italy) Tiziano Manfrin (1974–79)

33 (Italy) Gianmarco Zigoni (2015–17)

- 32 (Italy) Alberto Fontanesi (1950–53)
- 31 (Italy) Savino Bellini (1934–36, 1946–48)

31 (Italy) Mario Astorri (1942–43, 1945–46)

== Honours ==
Below is a list of titles and cups won by SPAL throughout their history.

=== Domestic ===
==== League titles ====
- Serie B
  - Winners (2): 1950–51, 2016–17
- Serie C / Serie C1 / Lega Pro
  - Winners (5): 1937–38, 1972–73, 1977–78, 1991–92, 2015–16
  - Runners-up (5): 1941–42, 1942–43, 1969–70, 1970–71, 1995–96
- Serie C2
  - Winners (1): 1997–98
  - Runners-up (1): 1990–91

==== Cups ====
- Coppa Italia
  - Runners-up (1): 1961–62
- Coppa Italia Serie C
  - Winners (1): 1998–99
  - Runners-up (1): 1988–89
- Supercoppa di Serie C / Lega Pro
  - Winners (1): 2016

=== European ===
- Cup of Italian-Swiss Friendship
  - Winners (1): 1968

=== Youth ===
- Campionato Primavera Serie B
  - Winners (1): 1964–65
- Campionato De Martino Serie A
  - Winners (1): 1967–68
- Campionato Nazionale Under-18
  - Winners (2): 2021–22, 2022–23
