= 1971–72 Serie B =

Italian football league season

Serie B
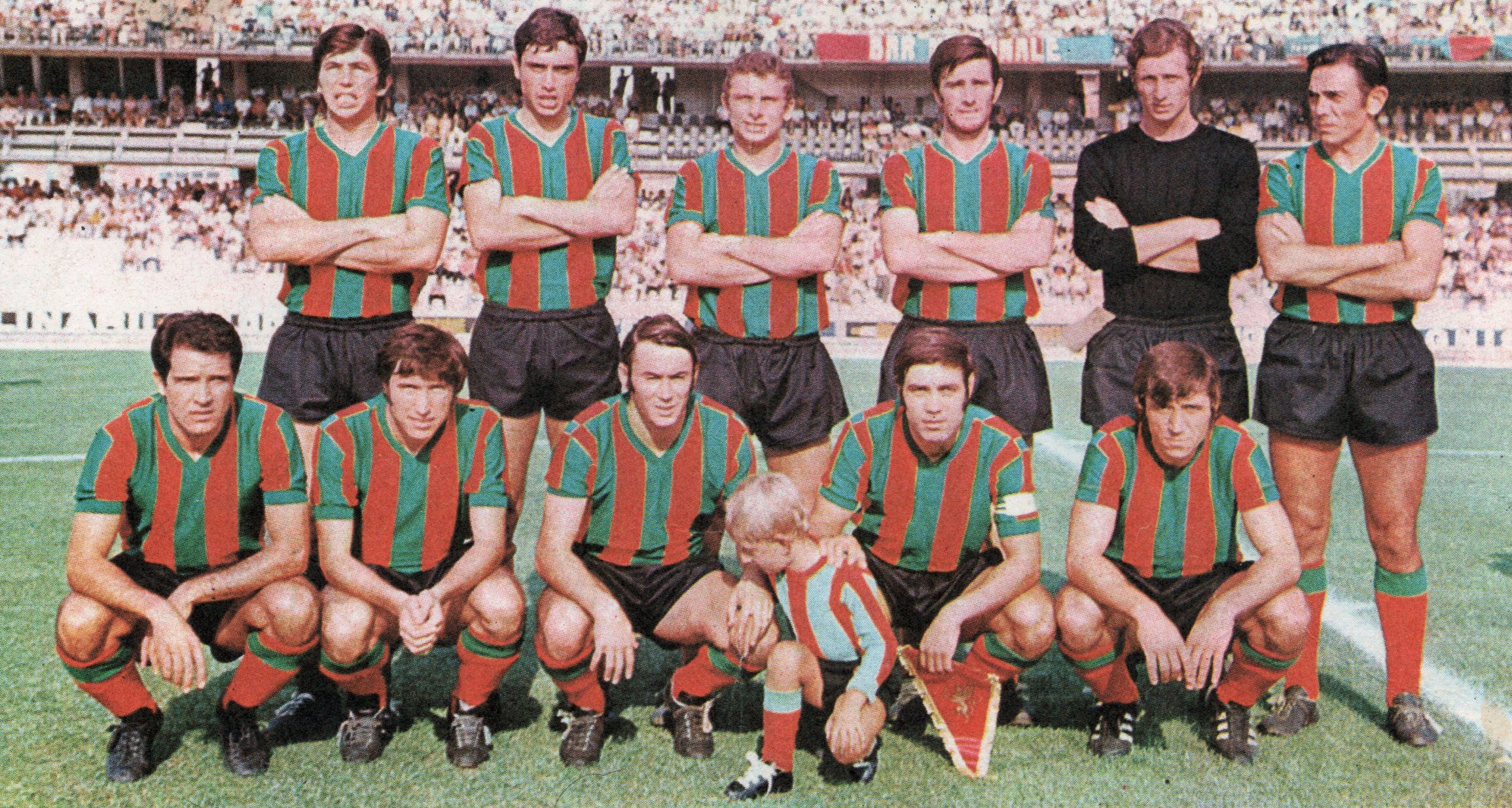
- 1971–72 Ternana squad
- Season: 1971–72
- Champions: Ternana; 1st title

Serie B 1971-72 team distribution

The Serie B 1971–72 was the fortieth tournament of this competition played in Italy since its creation.

== Teams ==
Genoa, Reggiana and Sorrento had been promoted from Serie C, while Foggia, Lazio and Catania had been relegated from Serie A.

== Final classification ==
| Pos | Team | Pld | W | D | L | GF | GA | GD | Pts | Promotion or relegation |
|---|---|---|---|---|---|---|---|---|---|---|
| 1 | Ternana (P, C) | 38 | 18 | 14 | 6 | 43 | 28 | +15 | 50 | Promotion to Serie A |
| 2 | Lazio (P) | 38 | 18 | 13 | 7 | 48 | 28 | +20 | 49 | Promotion to Serie A |
| 3 | Palermo (P) | 38 | 17 | 14 | 7 | 35 | 22 | +13 | 48 | Promotion to Serie A |
| 4 | Como | 38 | 14 | 18 | 6 | 35 | 24 | +11 | 46 | |
| 5 | Reggiana | 38 | 14 | 17 | 7 | 42 | 23 | +19 | 45 | |
| 6 | Cesena | 38 | 13 | 17 | 8 | 36 | 25 | +11 | 43 | |
| 7 | Perugia | 38 | 15 | 13 | 10 | 35 | 29 | +6 | 43 | |
| 8 | Catania | 38 | 14 | 13 | 11 | 34 | 27 | +7 | 41 | |
| 9 | Foggia | 38 | 13 | 15 | 10 | 39 | 33 | +6 | 41 | |
| 10 | Genoa | 38 | 14 | 13 | 11 | 35 | 34 | +1 | 41 | |
| 11 | Bari | 38 | 12 | 16 | 10 | 36 | 31 | +5 | 40 | |
| 12 | Brescia | 38 | 11 | 16 | 11 | 29 | 25 | +4 | 38 | |
| 13 | Taranto | 38 | 11 | 14 | 13 | 29 | 31 | −2 | 36 | |
| 14 | Novara | 38 | 14 | 8 | 16 | 40 | 45 | −5 | 36 | |
| 15 | Arezzo | 38 | 8 | 17 | 13 | 28 | 37 | −9 | 33 | |
| 16 | Reggina | 38 | 8 | 13 | 17 | 23 | 41 | −18 | 29 | |
| 17 | Monza | 38 | 6 | 16 | 16 | 20 | 37 | −17 | 28 | |
| 18 | Livorno (R) | 38 | 7 | 12 | 19 | 21 | 42 | −21 | 26 | Relegation to Serie C |
| 19 | Sorrento (R) | 38 | 8 | 9 | 21 | 23 | 42 | −19 | 25 | Relegation to Serie C |
| 20 | Modena (R) | 38 | 5 | 12 | 21 | 22 | 49 | −27 | 22 | Relegation to Serie C |

Source: Panini
(C) Champions; (P) Promoted; (R) Relegated

== Results ==
| Home \ Away | ARE | BAR | BRE | CTN | CES | COM | FOG | GEN | LAZ | LIV | MOD | MON | NOV | PAL | PER | REA | REG | SOR | TAR | TER |
|---|---|---|---|---|---|---|---|---|---|---|---|---|---|---|---|---|---|---|---|---|
| Arezzo | | 1–0 | 0–0 | 2–0 | 1–1 | 0–0 | 0–0 | 1–1 | 2–2 | 1–0 | 1–0 | 3–0 | 1–0 | 1–1 | 1–1 | 1–1 | 0–1 | 1–2 | 1–0 | 0–0 |
| Bari | 2–0 | | 1–1 | 2–2 | 1–1 | 0–2 | 1–1 | 1–1 | 0–0 | 2–1 | 3–2 | 1–0 | 2–1 | 2–0 | 0–3 | 1–0 | 3–0 | 0–1 | 2–0 | 3–0 |
| Brescia | 2–0 | 1–2 | | 0–0 | 1–0 | 0–0 | 0–0 | 2–1 | 4–0 | 1–1 | 1–0 | 2–1 | 3–0 | 0–1 | 0–0 | 1–1 | 3–1 | 2–0 | 0–1 | 1–0 |
| Catania | 1–1 | 0–0 | 1–0 | | 1–0 | 2–2 | 0–0 | 0–0 | 1–2 | 0–2 | 3–0 | 0–0 | 2–0 | 1–1 | 2–0 | 0–0 | 4–1 | 1–0 | 1–0 | 1–0 |
| Cesena | 2–0 | 0–0 | 2–0 | 1–0 | | 0–1 | 0–0 | 2–2 | 1–0 | 2–0 | 1–0 | 2–0 | 5–1 | 1–1 | 2–0 | 1–1 | 1–0 | 3–0 | 0–0 | 0–2 |
| Como | 0–0 | 1–0 | 0–0 | 0–1 | 2–0 | | 0–0 | 2–2 | 1–1 | 1–0 | 2–0 | 2–1 | 0–0 | 1–0 | 1–1 | 0–1 | 1–0 | 3–1 | 2–0 | 2–2 |
| Foggia | 2–1 | 2–2 | 0–0 | 4–1 | 2–0 | 0–0 | | 2–1 | 1–0 | 3–1 | 4–1 | 1–1 | 1–0 | 0–0 | 4–2 | 1–1 | 1–0 | 3–0 | 1–1 | 0–1 |
| Genoa | 1–3 | 0–0 | 1–0 | 1–0 | 1–0 | 1–1 | 1–0 | | 0–2 | 2–1 | 1–0 | 0–0 | 0–1 | 3–0 | 1–0 | 2–1 | 3–1 | 0–0 | 1–0 | 0–1 |
| Lazio | 2–0 | 1–1 | 1–0 | 1–0 | 1–1 | 3–1 | 2–0 | 2–0 | | 3–1 | 2–1 | 2–0 | 5–2 | 2–2 | 4–1 | 1–0 | 2–1 | 2–0 | 1–1 | 1–1 |
| Livorno | 1–0 | 2–1 | 0–0 | 1–0 | 0–1 | 0–0 | 0–1 | 0–0 | 0–1 | | 1–1 | 1–0 | 1–3 | 0–0 | 1–1 | 0–0 | 0–0 | 0–1 | 1–0 | 0–0 |
| Modena | 2–2 | 0–0 | 0–2 | 1–2 | 0–0 | 0–1 | 1–0 | 1–1 | 0–0 | 0–1 | | 2–0 | 2–0 | 0–1 | 0–2 | 0–0 | 0–0 | 1–0 | 0–1 | 1–2 |
| Monza | 1–1 | 0–0 | 0–0 | 0–2 | 1–1 | 0–0 | 2–0 | 0–1 | 0–0 | 2–2 | 2–0 | | 1–0 | 1–1 | 1–0 | 1–0 | 0–0 | 1–1 | 1–0 | 0–0 |
| Novara | 2–0 | 1–1 | 2–0 | 1–2 | 2–2 | 0–1 | 1–0 | 1–0 | 1–0 | 3–0 | 3–3 | 1–1 | | 2–0 | 1–0 | 0–0 | 1–0 | 1–0 | 2–1 | 3–1 |
| Palermo | 0–0 | 2–0 | 1–0 | 1–0 | 2–0 | 2–2 | 1–0 | 2–0 | 0–0 | 1–0 | 4–0 | 1–0 | 2–1 | | 1–0 | 1–0 | 1–0 | 1–0 | 3–0 | 0–0 |
| Perugia | 1–0 | 1–0 | 1–1 | 1–0 | 0–0 | 1–0 | 1–1 | 0–2 | 1–0 | 2–0 | 1–1 | 2–0 | 1–0 | 3–1 | | 0–0 | 1–0 | 1–0 | 2–0 | 1–0 |
| Reggiana | 2–0 | 0–0 | 0–0 | 0–0 | 1–1 | 2–0 | 4–1 | 3–0 | 1–0 | 2–0 | 3–0 | 4–1 | 2–2 | 1–0 | 1–1 | | 2–0 | 3–0 | 2–1 | 1–1 |
| Reggina | 3–0 | 1–0 | 1–1 | 0–2 | 1–1 | 1–0 | 0–0 | 1–0 | 1–1 | 2–1 | 0–0 | 1–0 | 1–0 | 0–0 | 0–0 | 0–1 | | 2–2 | 0–0 | 1–2 |
| Sorrento | 0–0 | 0–2 | 4–0 | 1–0 | 0–1 | 1–2 | 0–1 | 1–2 | 0–1 | 2–0 | 0–0 | 0–0 | 0–0 | 0–0 | 0–0 | 2–0 | 2–0 | | 0–2 | 1–2 |
| Taranto | 1–0 | 0–0 | 1–0 | 1–1 | 0–0 | 0–0 | 4–2 | 1–1 | 0–0 | 0–0 | 0–1 | 2–1 | 1–0 | 0–0 | 1–1 | 1–1 | 4–1 | 2–0 | | 2–0 |
| Ternana | 2–2 | 2–0 | 0–0 | 0–0 | 0–0 | 1–1 | 2–0 | 1–1 | 1–0 | 3–1 | 2–1 | 1–0 | 3–1 | 1–0 | 2–1 | 2–0 | 1–1 | 2–1 | 2–0 | |

Source: Almanacco Illustrato del Calcio - La Storia 1898-2004, Panini Edizioni, Modena, September 2005 (in Italian)
Legend: Blue = home team win; Yellow = draw; Red = away team win.

== Attendances ==
| # | Club | Average |
|---|---|---|
| 1 | Lazio | 26,132 |
| 2 | Palermo | 18,637 |
| 3 | Genoa | 15,357 |
| 4 | Taranto | 11,634 |
| 5 | Reggiana | 11,347 |
| 6 | Ternana | 10,934 |
| 7 | Bari | 9,739 |
| 8 | Foggia | 9,624 |
| 9 | Cesena | 8,002 |
| 10 | Livorno | 7,882 |
| 11 | Catania | 7,083 |
| 12 | Perugia | 6,669 |
| 13 | Brescia | 6,642 |
| 14 | Modena | 5,318 |
| 15 | Como | 5,148 |
| 16 | Reggina | 5,136 |
| 17 | Arezzo | 4,952 |
| 18 | Novara | 4,533 |
| 19 | Monza | 3,559 |
| 20 | Sorrento | 2,322 |

== References and sources ==
- Almanacco Illustrato del Calcio - La Storia 1898-2004, Panini Edizioni, Modena, September 2005

Specific
