= 1969–70 Serie B =

Italian football league season

Serie B
- Season: 1969–70
- Champions: Varese; 2nd title

Serie B 1969-70 team distribution

The Serie B 1969–70 was the thirty-eighth tournament of this competition played in Italy since its creation.

== Teams ==
Piacenza, Arezzo and Taranto had been promoted from Serie C, while Varese, Pisa and Atalanta had been relegated from Serie A.

== Final classification ==
Pos	Team	Pld	W	D	L	GF	GA	GD	Pts	Promotion or relegation
1	Varese (P, C)	38	16	17	5	41	21	+20	49	Promotion to Serie A
2	Foggia (P)	38	16	16	6	42	25	+17	48	Promotion to Serie A
3	Catania (P)	38	15	18	5	34	19	+15	48	Promotion to Serie A
4	Mantova	38	12	23	3	39	22	+17	47	
5	Monza	38	15	15	8	30	19	+11	45	
6	Reggina	38	13	15	10	39	34	+5	41	
7	Pisa	38	11	17	10	31	29	+2	39	
8	Ternana	38	10	19	9	30	31	−1	39	
9	Livorno	38	11	16	11	26	25	+1	38	
10	Perugia	38	10	15	13	25	25	0	35	
11	Cesena	38	8	19	11	25	28	−3	35	
12	Modena	38	9	17	12	24	30	−6	35	
13	Como	38	11	12	15	33	44	−11	34	
14	Arezzo	38	5	24	9	15	27	−12	34	
15	Atalanta	38	8	17	13	30	29	+1	33	
16	Catanzaro	38	7	19	12	23	30	−7	33	
17	Taranto	38	8	17	13	27	35	−8	33	
18	Reggiana (R)	38	6	21	11	22	31	−9	33	Relegation to Serie C (Note: Reggiana relegated on goal difference.)
19	Piacenza (R)	38	7	18	13	26	45	−19	32	Relegation to Serie C
20	Genoa (R)	38	6	17	15	19	32	−13	29	Relegation to Serie C

Source: Panini
(C) Champions; (P) Promoted; (R) Relegated

== Results ==
Home \ Away	ARE	ATA	CTN	CTZ	CES	COM	FOG	GEN	LIV	MAN	MOD	MON	PER	PIA	PIS	REA	REG	TAR	TER	VAR
Arezzo		2–1	0–0	1–1	0–0	2–0	0–0	1–0	1–1	0–0	0–0	0–0	0–0	1–1	0–0	0–0	0–0	1–0	0–0	1–2
Atalanta	2–0		0–1	2–0	0–0	1–0	0–0	0–0	1–1	0–0	0–0	0–1	2–0	4–0	0–0	2–0	1–0	1–2	0–0	0–0
Catania	3–0	1–0		2–2	0–0	1–0	0–0	0–0	0–0	2–1	2–0	0–0	1–0	2–1	1–0	2–0	0–0	2–0	0–1	0–0
Catanzaro	1–1	1–0	1–1		1–0	2–0	2–1	0–0	0–2	0–0	0–1	0–0	0–0	0–1	0–0	0–0	2–0	0–0	4–0	1–1
Cesena	1–0	0–0	0–1	2–0		2–1	0–0	0–1	0–0	1–1	2–1	0–1	2–0	1–0	1–2	1–1	2–2	2–2	1–1	1–1
Como	1–0	2–1	0–2	2–1	0–0		3–1	1–1	1–0	0–0	0–0	1–0	0–0	2–1	1–0	1–2	2–2	2–3	2–1	2–0
Foggia	1–1	1–0	0–0	1–0	2–0	1–1		2–2	3–1	0–0	2–2	1–0	2–0	3–0	1–0	2–0	1–1	1–0	3–3	2–0
Genoa	0–0	1–1	1–0	2–0	1–2	1–0	1–3		0–1	0–2	0–0	0–0	0–0	1–1	1–1	1–0	1–3	0–0	0–1	1–0
Livorno	0–0	0–0	0–0	1–1	0–1	0–1	1–0	1–0		0–0	2–0	0–0	0–0	2–0	2–0	1–0	0–1	4–1	1–1	0–0
Mantova	1–1	2–1	0–0	4–0	1–0	5–0	1–0	1–1	1–0		1–0	0–0	1–0	3–2	4–1	1–1	1–2	1–1	1–0	1–1
Modena	1–0	2–1	1–3	1–0	0–0	0–0	2–0	0–0	2–1	1–1		1–0	0–0	1–2	0–0	1–1	1–1	1–1	1–0	0–1
Monza	3–0	1–1	2–0	1–1	1–0	0–0	0–1	2–0	0–0	1–1	2–1		2–1	1–1	1–0	0–0	2–0	1–0	2–0	1–0
Perugia	0–0	1–0	3–1	0–0	1–0	3–2	0–1	0–0	0–1	0–0	2–0	2–0		0–0	1–2	2–0	0–0	0–0	1–1	0–1
Piacenza	0–1	0–0	1–1	1–0	1–1	1–1	1–1	1–1	1–1	0–0	0–0	0–0	1–0		1–2	1–0	0–3	2–0	1–1	0–5
Pisa	0–0	0–1	2–0	0–0	3–1	0–0	1–1	2–0	1–0	0–0	1–1	0–0	2–5	1–1		0–0	3–0	1–0	1–1	0–0
Reggiana	0–0	2–0	0–0	1–1	0–0	3–2	0–0	1–0	1–2	1–1	1–1	0–1	0–1	0–0	1–0		0–0	0–0	2–1	1–1
Reggina	3–0	2–2	1–3	0–0	0–0	1–0	1–1	1–0	4–0	0–0	1–0	2–0	1–0	1–1	1–2	2–2		1–0	0–1	1–0
Taranto	1–1	2–2	0–0	1–0	1–1	2–0	0–1	1–0	1–0	0–0	0–1	2–3	0–2	2–0	0–2	0–0	3–1		0–0	0–0
Ternana	0–0	2–1	1–1	0–1	0–0	3–1	0–2	1–0	0–0	2–2	1–0	1–0	2–0	0–1	0–0	0–0	2–0	1–1		1–1
Varese	3–0	2–2	1–1	0–0	1–0	1–1	1–0	2–1	2–0	3–0	1–0	2–1	0–0	2–0	2–1	3–1	1–0	0–0	0–0	

Source: Almanacco Illustrato del Calcio - La Storia 1898-2004, Panini Edizioni, Modena, September 2005 (in Italian)
Legend: Blue = home team win; Yellow = draw; Red = away team win.

== Attendances ==
#	Club	Average
1	Taranto	13,533
2	Foggia	13,484
3	Atalanta	12,069
4	Catania	11,093
5	Livorno	10,995
6	Genoa	10,786
7	Mantova	9,510
8	Pisa	9,450
9	Reggina	8,207
10	Modena	7,866
11	Reggiana	7,832
12	Piacenza	7,256
13	Ternana	7,168
14	Varese	6,570
15	Monza	5,957
16	Perugia	5,953
17	Cesena	5,737
18	Como	5,233
19	Arezzo	5,072
20	Catanzaro	4,089

== References and sources ==
- Almanacco Illustrato del Calcio - La Storia 1898-2004, Panini Edizioni, Modena, September 2005

Specific
