= 1974–75 Serie C =

The 1974–75 Serie C was the thirty-seventh edition of Serie C, the third highest league in the Italian football league system.

== Girone A ==
Serie C Gir. A 1974-75 team distribution
Serie C Gir. B 1974-75 team distribution
Serie C Gir. B 1974-75 team distribution in Tuscany
Serie C Gir. C 1974-75 team distribution
Serie C Gir. C 1974-75 team distribution in Campania

| Pos | Team | Pld | W | D | L | GF | GA | GD | Pts | Promotion or relegation |
|---|---|---|---|---|---|---|---|---|---|---|
| 1 | Piacenza | 38 | 24 | 9 | 5 | 69 | 34 | +35 | 57 | Promoted to Serie B |
| 2 | Monza | 38 | 18 | 14 | 6 | 47 | 23 | +24 | 50 | |
| 3 | Udinese | 38 | 15 | 16 | 7 | 55 | 36 | +19 | 46 | |
| 4 | Seregno | 38 | 14 | 17 | 7 | 41 | 31 | +10 | 45 | |
| 5 | Vigevano | 38 | 14 | 11 | 13 | 46 | 40 | +6 | 39 | |
| 6 | Cremonese | 38 | 12 | 14 | 12 | 45 | 36 | +9 | 38 | |
| 7 | Venezia | 38 | 9 | 20 | 9 | 32 | 36 | −4 | 38 | |
| 8 | Trento | 38 | 12 | 13 | 13 | 43 | 40 | +3 | 37 | |
| 9 | Clodiasottomarina | 38 | 10 | 17 | 11 | 32 | 31 | +1 | 37 | |
| 10 | Lecco | 38 | 10 | 17 | 11 | 25 | 32 | −7 | 37 | |
| 11 | Pro Vercelli | 38 | 6 | 24 | 8 | 26 | 27 | −1 | 36 | |
| 12 | Sant'Angelo | 38 | 10 | 16 | 12 | 32 | 39 | −7 | 36 | |
| 13 | Mantova | 38 | 9 | 18 | 11 | 32 | 40 | −8 | 36 | |
| 14 | Bolzano | 38 | 7 | 21 | 10 | 32 | 40 | −8 | 35 | |
| 15 | Belluno | 38 | 9 | 17 | 12 | 29 | 40 | −11 | 35 | |
| 16 | Juniorcasale | 38 | 8 | 19 | 11 | 25 | 37 | −12 | 35 | |
| 17 | Padova | 38 | 11 | 13 | 14 | 28 | 42 | −14 | 35 | |
| 18 | Solbiatese | 38 | 7 | 18 | 13 | 31 | 37 | −6 | 32 | Relegated to Serie D |
| 19 | Mestrina | 38 | 8 | 13 | 17 | 34 | 44 | −10 | 29 | Relegated to Serie D |
| 20 | Legnano | 38 | 5 | 17 | 16 | 30 | 49 | −19 | 27 | Relegated to Serie D |

== Girone B ==
| Pos | Team | Pld | W | D | L | GF | GA | GD | Pts | Promotion or relegation |
|---|---|---|---|---|---|---|---|---|---|---|
| 1 | Modena | 38 | 21 | 11 | 6 | 50 | 27 | +23 | 53 | Promoted to Serie B |
| 2 | Rimini | 38 | 17 | 17 | 4 | 41 | 20 | +21 | 51 | |
| 3 | Teramo | 38 | 18 | 14 | 6 | 45 | 20 | +25 | 50 | |
| 4 | Sangiovannese | 38 | 13 | 16 | 9 | 39 | 26 | +13 | 42 | |
| 5 | Giulianova | 38 | 16 | 10 | 12 | 33 | 29 | +4 | 42 | |
| 6 | Pro Vasto | 38 | 13 | 15 | 10 | 34 | 33 | +1 | 41 | |
| 7 | Chieti | 38 | 15 | 9 | 14 | 43 | 34 | +9 | 39 | |
| 8 | Grosseto | 38 | 14 | 11 | 13 | 44 | 37 | +7 | 39 | |
| 9 | Lucchese | 38 | 10 | 19 | 9 | 28 | 26 | +2 | 39 | |
| 10 | Empoli | 38 | 13 | 13 | 12 | 29 | 32 | −3 | 39 | |
| 11 | Massese | 38 | 12 | 16 | 10 | 35 | 30 | +5 | 38 (Note: 2 points deducted.) | |
| 12 | Spezia | 38 | 12 | 13 | 13 | 36 | 43 | −7 | 37 | |
| 13 | Livorno | 38 | 13 | 10 | 15 | 39 | 48 | −9 | 36 | |
| 14 | Riccione | 38 | 12 | 10 | 16 | 30 | 37 | −7 | 34 | |
| 15 | Aquila Montevarchi | 38 | 11 | 12 | 15 | 22 | 32 | −10 | 34 | |
| 16 | Pisa | 38 | 12 | 9 | 17 | 37 | 41 | −4 | 33 | |
| 17 | Ravenna | 38 | 10 | 13 | 15 | 26 | 35 | −9 | 33 | |
| 18 | Novese | 38 | 12 | 8 | 18 | 36 | 44 | −8 | 32 | Relegated to Serie D |
| 19 | Torres | 38 | 6 | 12 | 20 | 28 | 53 | −25 | 24 | Relegated to Serie D |
| 20 | Carpi | 38 | 6 | 10 | 22 | 24 | 52 | −28 | 22 | Relegated to Serie D |

== Girone C ==
| Pos | Team | Pld | W | D | L | GF | GA | GD | Pts | Promotion or relegation |
|---|---|---|---|---|---|---|---|---|---|---|
| 1 | Catania | 38 | 20 | 17 | 1 | 57 | 21 | +36 | 57 | Promoted to Serie B |
| 2 | Bari | 38 | 21 | 14 | 3 | 59 | 21 | +38 | 56 | |
| 3 | Lecce | 38 | 17 | 13 | 8 | 33 | 15 | +18 | 47 | |
| 4 | Benevento | 38 | 16 | 11 | 11 | 44 | 38 | +6 | 43 | |
| 5 | Siracusa | 38 | 12 | 18 | 8 | 36 | 26 | +10 | 42 | |
| 6 | Reggina | 38 | 13 | 13 | 12 | 43 | 40 | +3 | 39 | |
| 7 | Messina | 38 | 14 | 11 | 13 | 39 | 39 | 0 | 39 | |
| 8 | Salernitana | 38 | 12 | 15 | 11 | 24 | 25 | −1 | 39 | |
| 9 | Sorrento | 38 | 12 | 14 | 12 | 39 | 28 | +11 | 38 | |
| 10 | Marsala | 38 | 12 | 12 | 14 | 25 | 24 | +1 | 36 | |
| 11 | Acireale | 38 | 12 | 12 | 14 | 33 | 45 | −12 | 36 | |
| 12 | Turris | 38 | 13 | 9 | 16 | 44 | 43 | +1 | 35 | |
| 13 | Casertana | 38 | 9 | 17 | 12 | 27 | 30 | −3 | 35 | |
| 14 | Trapani | 38 | 9 | 17 | 12 | 25 | 32 | −7 | 35 | |
| 15 | Crotone | 38 | 10 | 15 | 13 | 30 | 43 | −13 | 35 | |
| 16 | Nocerina | 38 | 9 | 16 | 13 | 30 | 36 | −6 | 34 | |
| 17 | Barletta | 38 | 10 | 14 | 14 | 26 | 39 | −13 | 34 | |
| 18 | Frosinone | 38 | 10 | 13 | 15 | 31 | 35 | −4 | 33 | Relegated to Serie D |
| 19 | Matera | 38 | 7 | 13 | 18 | 26 | 44 | −18 | 27 | Relegated to Serie D |
| 20 | Cynthia | 38 | 6 | 8 | 24 | 20 | 67 | −47 | 20 | Relegated to Serie D |

== References and sources ==
- Almanacco Illustrato del Calcio – La Storia 1898–2004, Panini Edizioni, Modena, September 2005
