= Piacenza Calcio 1919 =

Italian football club

Piacenza
- Full name: Piacenza Calcio S.r.l.
- Nicknames: Il Piace (The Piace); I Biancorossi (The Red and Whites); I Papaveri (The Poppies); I Lupi (The Wolves)
- Founded: 1919; 107 years ago as Piacenza FC; 2012; 14 years ago as Piacenza Calcio
- Stadium: Stadio Leonardo Garilli
- Capacity: 21,668
- Owner: Kirill Bosov (49%)
- President: Marco Polenghi
- Head coach: Stefano Rossini
- League: Serie D Group B
- 2023–24: Serie D Group B, 2nd of 20
- Website: www.piacenzacalcio.it
Home colours	Away colours	Third colours

Piacenza Calcio 1919, commonly referred to as just Piacenza, is an Italian association football club based in Piacenza, Emilia-Romagna. The club currently plays in Serie D, the fourth tier of Italian football.

== History ==
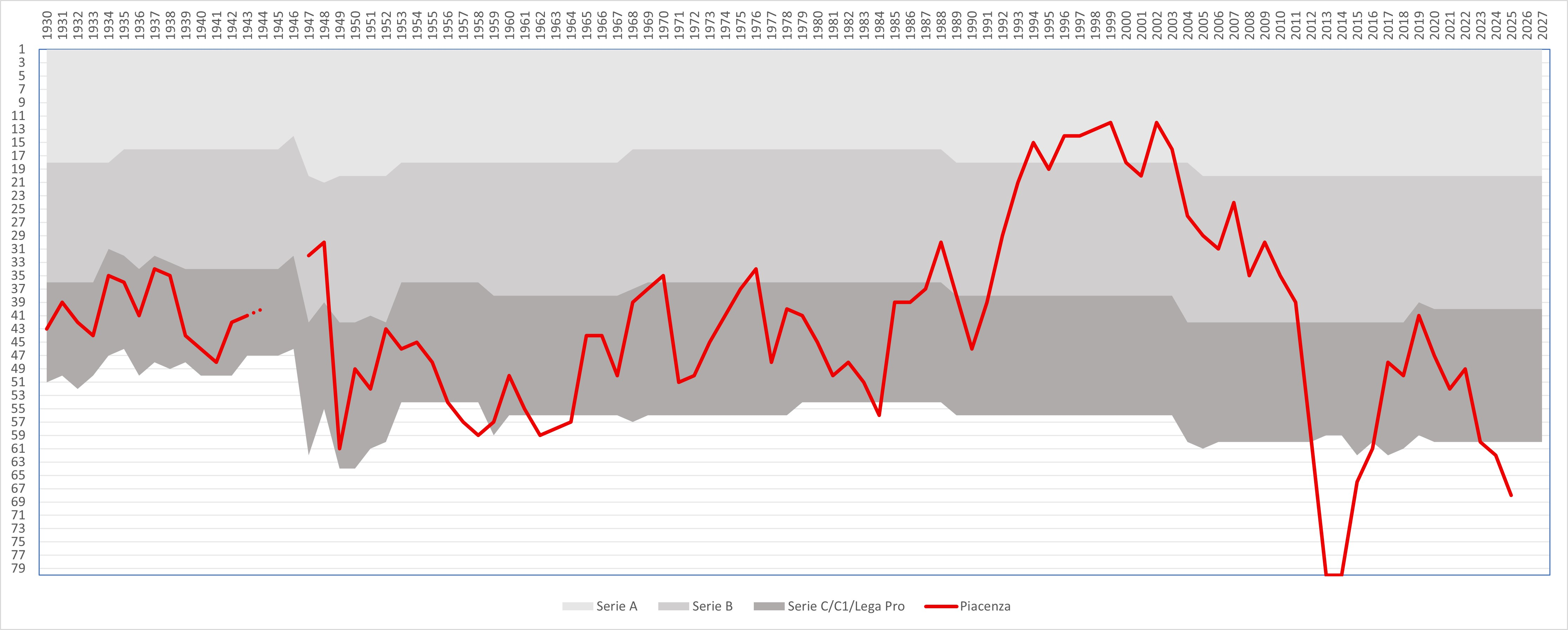
The performance of Piacenza in the Italian football league structure since the first season of a unified Serie A (1929/30).

=== Foundation of Piacenza F.C. ===
Piacenza Football Club was founded in 1919 with Giovanni Dosi as the first club president. Dosi was an ambitious manager, taking control of every social, technical, and administrative aspect of the club, with the sole focus at bringing the club into the national championship under the FIGC.

After spending much of the club's early life in the regional leagues, they entered into the Serie C for the 1935–36 season, coming close to gaining promotion into the Serie B in 1938 but losing to Fanfulla.

==== From Serie B to Serie D ====
After World War II, Piacenza competed in Serie B for the first time, participating in two seasons before being relegated back down to Serie C in 1948.

The club were punished for illicit sportsmanship in 1956 and were relegated to Serie D. This proved to be quite a heavy blow for the club as they would continue to yo-yo between Serie C and D until 1964. Piacenza finally returned to Serie B in 1969, under coach Tino Molinari and president Vincenzo Romagnoli.

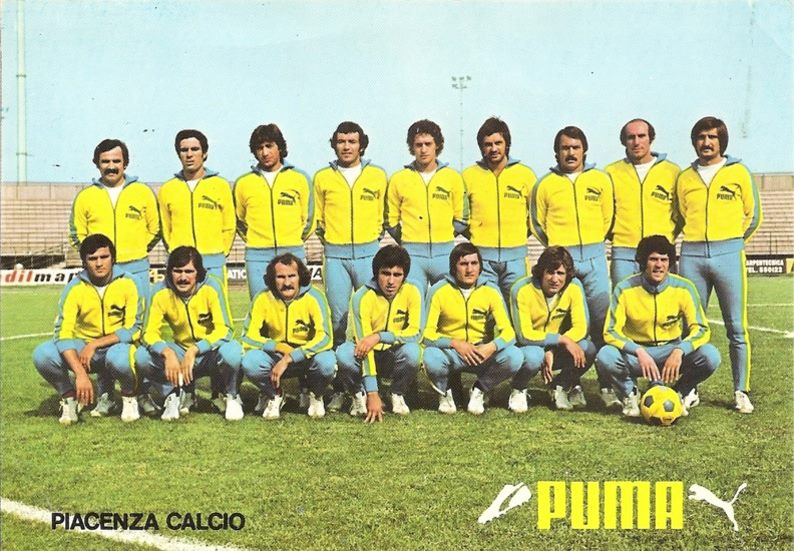
1975–76 Piacenza

Piacenza's history until recent times was mostly undistinguished, with brief spells in Serie B in the 1940s and further spells in 1969–70, 1975–76, and 1987–88 to 1988–89.

==== Between Serie A and Serie B ====
Promotion in 1991 saw a rise in the side's fortunes under coach Gigi Cagni, with the club promoted to Serie A for the first time in 1993, but was immediately relegated in the next season, despite the presence of players such as midfielder Daniele Moretti, winger Francesco Turrini, and forward Giampietro Piovani. For much of the season, Piacenza had battled into mid-table and were even a few points short of a European place, but were relegated on the last day of the season in a tight scrap. The club wisely chose to retain Cagni and most of his squad, and they would achieve promotion as Serie B champions in 1995.

The following five years saw the club win many supporters with its all-Italian lineup and successful battles against relegation. This period also saw Piacenza produce a generation of talented players from its youth academy, such as future Italian international players Filippo Inzaghi, Simone Inzaghi, Alberto Gilardino, as well as Alessandro Lucarelli. In 1997 the club acquired legendary hard man defender Pietro Vierchowod. Despite his advancing years, Vierchowod proved an outstanding purchase, more than holding his own in defence and even scoring decisive goals in the relegation battle. Relegation in 2000 was followed by an instant return to Serie A for two years with outstanding form shown by players like midfielder Enzo Maresca, as the club reached as high as 12th place in the 2001-02 season.

Piacenza was relegated in 2002-03, finishing in 16th position and thus returned to Serie B. The club remained in Serie B without threatening to mount a promotion challenge.

However following a poor 2010–11 Serie B season, Piacenza found themselves in a relegation playoff against Albinoleffe which they lost due to Albinoleffe's higher league position.

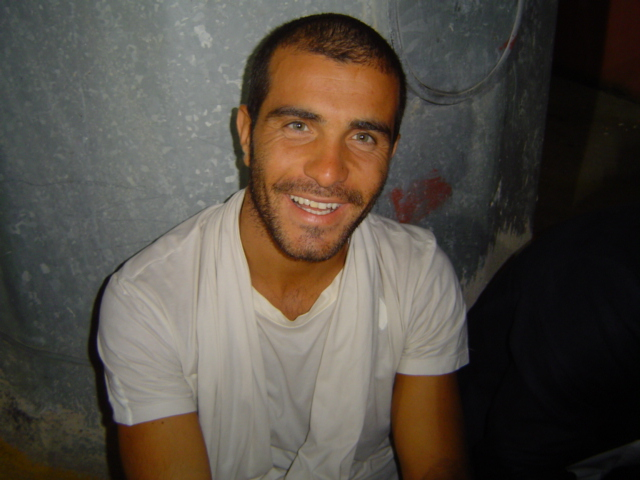
Midfielder Enzo Maresca who played the 2002–2003 season on loan at Piacenza.

==== 2012: Final bankruptcy after relegation ====
On 22 March 2012 Piacenza Calcio in strong financial difficulty was declared bankrupt by the court of Piacenza. In this season it was ranked 15th and relegated from Lega Pro Prima Divisione to Lega Pro Seconda Divisione after play-out. On 19 June 2012 the club was finally declared bankrupt and the team was disbanded.

=== The refoundation: from Lupa Piacenza to Piacenza Calcio 1919 ===
Following the bankruptcy of Piacenza Football Club, regional amateur club A.C.D. LibertaSpes, recently promoted in the season 2011–12 to Eccellenza Emilia–Romagna after winning Promozione Emilia–Romagna Group A, was renamed to Lupa Piacenza after the obtaining the brand for four years from an association "Salva Piace", in order to continue the football history of Piacenza Football Club (aka Piacenza Calcio). In mid-2013 Lupa Piacenza was renamed Piacenza Calcio 1919. In 2013–14 Serie D season Piacenza Calcio was placed in the group B along with other team of the same city Pro Piacenza 1919 (formerly Atletico B.P. Pro Piacenza). In the 2015–16 Serie D season, Piacenza Calcio secured promotion to Lega Pro by winning the Group B title with 96 points and 30 wins over the course of the season, beating second placed Lecco by 16 points. The club didn't manage any further promotions however, and after a few seasons in Serie C, they were relegated to Serie D in the summer of 2023.

== Stadium ==
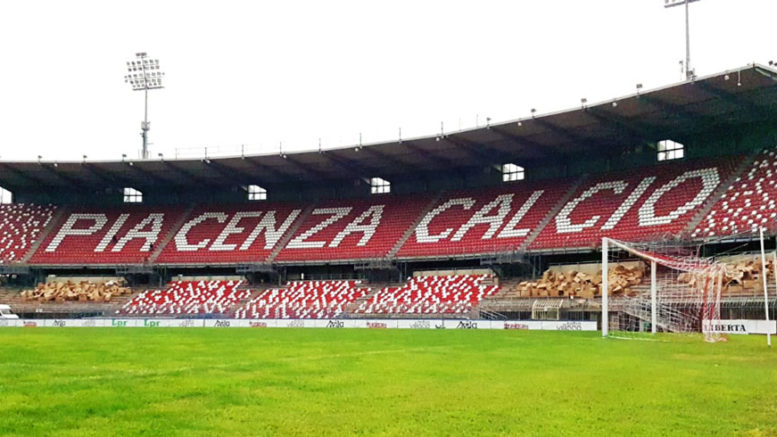
Stadio Leonardo Garilli in 2019.

Piacenza Calcio 1919 and Piacenza Calcio play their home matches at the 21,668-capacity Stadio Leonardo Garilli, located in the city of Piacenza.

== Players ==
=== Current squad ===
As of 16 July 2024

Note: Flags indicate national team as defined under FIFA eligibility rules; some limited exceptions apply. Players may hold more than one non-FIFA nationality.

No.	Pos.	Nation	Player
1	GK	ITA	Christian Maianti
4	DF	ITA	Riccardo Del Dotto
6	MF	ITA	Luca Boffini
8	MF	ITA	Nicola Andreoli
9	FW	ITA	Giorgio Recino
10	MF	ITA	Mattia Corradi
15	DF	ITA	Michele Somma
19	FW	ITA	Matteo Russo
20	MF	GUI	Amadou Touré
21	MF	ITA	Giorgio Bachini
28	DF	ITA	Jacopo Silva
37	FW	ITA	Riccardo Bassanini
38	DF	ITA	Antonio Napoletano
98	GK	ITA	Thomas Charles Galletti

No.	Pos.	Nation	Player
—	DF	GHA	Billy Bitihene
—	DF	ITA	Matthias Solerio
—	MF	ITA	Roberto Grieco
—	FW	ITA	Carlo Manicone
—	FW	ITA	Mattia Mauri
—	DF	ITA	Simone Lob
—	MF	POR	Edi Castro
—	MF	ITA	Cristian Poerio
—	DF	ITA	Pasquale Ruiz Giraldo
—	FW	ROU	Darlan Hrom
—	DF	ITA	Gabriele Argint (on loan from Mantova 1911)

=== Out on loan ===
Note: Flags indicate national team as defined under FIFA eligibility rules; some limited exceptions apply. Players may hold more than one non-FIFA nationality.

No.	Pos.	Nation	Player
—	FW	POR	Edi Castro (at Gladiator until 30 June 2024)
—	FW	ROU	Darian Hrom (at Ghiviborgo until 30 June 2024)

No.	Pos.	Nation	Player
—	FW	ITA	Cristian Poerio (at Crotone U19 until 30 June 2024)

== Notable former managers ==
See Category:Piacenza Calcio 1919 managers.

== Honours ==
- Anglo-Italian Cup
  - Winners: 1986
- Serie B
  - Winners: 1994–95
  - Runners-up: 2000–01
  - Promoted: 1992–93
- Serie C
  - Winners: 1968–69, 1974–75, 1986–87, 1990–91
  - Runners-up: 1936–37, 1937–38 (Note: Finished equal in first position but lost play-off game to A.C. Fanfulla 1874)
- Serie D
  - Winners: 1963–64, 2015–16
- Seconda Divisione
  - Promoted: 1927–28
  - Group runners-up: 1922–23, 1924–25
- Emilian Championship
  - Winners: 1919–20
