= 2023–24 Novara FC season =

Novara FC
2023–24 season
- Manager: Daniele Buzzegoli (until 14 October); Giacomo Gattuso (from 16 October)
- Stadium: Stadio Silvio Piola
- Serie C: 17th
- Relegation play-outs: Finals
- Coppa Italia Serie C: Second round
- Biggest win: Fiorenzuola 2–3 Novara
- Biggest defeat: Novara 0–3 Trento; Novara 0–3 AlbinoLeffe

The 2023–24 season is Novara FC's 116th season in existence and second consecutive season in the Serie C. They are also competing in the Coppa Italia Serie C.

== Players ==
=== First-team squad ===
As of 3 September 2023

Note: Flags indicate national team as defined under FIFA eligibility rules; some limited exceptions apply. Players may hold more than one non-FIFA nationality.

No.	Pos.	Nation	Player
3	MF	DEN	Oliver Urso
4	MF	ITA	Luca Prinelli
5	DF	ITA	Samuele Bonaccorsi
6	DF	ITA	Davide Bertoncini
7	FW	ITA	Filippo Gerardini
8	MF	ITA	Alessandro Di Munno
9	FW	ITA	Stefano Scappini
10	FW	ITA	Christian Donadio
11	FW	ITA	Niccolò Corti
12	GK	ITA	Giacomo Boscolo Palo
15	DF	MAR	Omar Khailoti
16	MF	ITA	Riccardo Calcagni
17	DF	ITA	Mattia Scaringi (on loan from Cremonese)

No.	Pos.	Nation	Player
20	FW	ITA	Lorenzo Catania
21	MF	ITA	Roberto Ranieri
23	MF	ITA	Giorgio Savini (on loan from Torino)
24	MF	ITA	Mattia Speranza
25	MF	ITA	Samuele Gerbino
26	DF	ITA	Salvatore Boccia (on loan from Cagliari)
27	FW	ITA	Simone Rossetti
30	DF	ITA	Francesco Migliardi
31	GK	CAN	Axel Desjardins
32	DF	ITA	Lorenzo Caradonna
33	FW	ITA	Ludovico D'Orazio (on loan from SPAL)
39	DF	ITA	Yaniss Saidi
98	MF	ITA	Niccolò Bagatti

== Transfers ==
=== In ===
Pos.	Player	Transferred from	Fee	Date	Source

=== Out ===
Pos.	Player	Transferred to	Fee	Date	Source

== Pre-season and friendlies ==
Win Draw Loss Fixtures

29 July 2023 Friendly	Giana Erminio (Italy)	0–2	(Italy) Novara
--:-- CEST (UTC+2)

2 August 2023 Friendly	Fiorenzuola (Italy)	1–6	(Italy) Novara
--:-- CEST (UTC+2)

6 August 2023 Friendly	Novara (Italy)	0–1	(Italy) Sampdoria
--:-- CEST (UTC+2)

13 August 2023 Friendly	Milan (Italy)	4–2	(Italy) Novara	Milanello
10:30 CEST (UTC+2)				Referee: Gualtieri

24 August 2023 Friendly	Gozzano (Italy)	2–3	(Italy) Novara
--:-- CEST (UTC+2)

26 August 2023 Friendly	Virtus Entella (Italy)	3–0	(Italy) Novara
--:-- CEST (UTC+2)

== Competitions ==
=== Overall record ===
Competition	First match	Last match	Starting round	Final position	Record							
Competition	First match	Last match	Starting round	Final position	Pld	W	D	L	GF	GA	GD	Win %
Serie C	4 September 2023	28 April 2024	Matchday 1	17th	37	8	18	11	39	49	−10	21.62
Relegation play-out	12 May 2024	19 May 2024	First leg		0	0	0	0	0	0	+0	—
Coppa Italia Serie C	3 October 2023	9 November 2023	First round	Second round	2	1	0	1	4	4	+0	50.00
Total					39	9	18	12	43	53	−10	23.08

Last updated: 28 April 2024
Source: Soccerway

=== Serie C ===
==== League table ====
Pos	Team	Pld	W	D	L	GF	GA	GD	Pts	Qualification
15	Renate	38	11	12	15	35	46	−11	45 (Note: Albinoleffe are ahead of Renate on head-to-head points: Albinoleffe 8, Pergolettese 5, Renate 2.)	
16	Arzignano	38	10	14	14	32	37	−5	44	
17	Novara (O)	38	8	19	11	39	49	−10	43	Relegation play-outs
18	Fiorenzuola (R)	38	10	8	20	38	62	−24	38	Relegation play-outs
19	Pro Sesto (Note: Automatically relegated for having more than eight points of distance from 16th-placed team Arzignano.) (R)	38	7	14	17	25	40	−15	35	Relegation to Serie D

Updated to match(es) played on 28 April 2024. Source: Lega Pro, Soccerway (in English)
Rules for classification: 1) Points; 2) Head-to-head points; 3) Head-to-head goal difference; 4) Goal difference; 5) Goals scored; 6) Lower goals against; 7) Wins; 8) Lower losses; 9) Away wins; 10) Lower home losses.
(Note: Head-to-head record is used only after all the matches between the teams in question have been played)
(O) Play-off winners; (R) Relegated

==== Results summary ====
Overall								Home						Away					
Pld	W	D	L	GF	GA	GD	Pts	W	D	L	GF	GA	GD	W	D	L	GF	GA	GD
38	8	19	11	39	49	−10	43	6	6	7	22	27	−5	2	13	4	17	22	−5

Source: Worldfootball

==== Results by round ====
Round	1	2	3	4	5	6	7	8	9	10	11	12	13	14	15	16	17	18	19	20	21	22	23	24	25	26	27	28	29	30	31	32	33	34	35	36	37	38
Ground	A	H	H	A	H	A	A	H	A	H	A	H	A	H	A	H	A	H	A	H	A	A	H	A	H	H	A	H	A	H	A	H	A	H	A	H	A	H
Result	D	L	L	L	D	D	D	L	L	L	D	L	D	W	D	D	D	L	W	W	L	D	L	W	W	W	D	D	D	D	D	D	D	D	L	W	D	W
Position	10	16	19	20	19	19	19	19	19	20	20	20	20	20	18	19	19	19	18	17	17	17	17	17	17	16	17	17	17	17	17	17	17	17	18	17	17	17

Source: Worldfootball
A = Away; H = Home; W = Win; D = Draw; L = Loss

==== Matches ====
The league fixtures were unveiled on 7 August 2023.

4 September 2023 1	Alessandria	0–0	Novara	Alessandria
20:45 CEST (UTC+2)		Report		Stadium: Stadio Giuseppe Moccagatta; Referee: Andrea Bordin

10 September 2023 2	Novara	1–2	Pro Patria	Novara
18:30 CEST (UTC+2)	D'Orazio 76'		Castelli 32'; Stanzani 40'	Stadium: Stadio Silvio Piola

17 September 2023 3	Novara	0–3	Trento	Novara
18:30 CEST (UTC+2)				Stadium: Stadio Silvio Piola

20 September 2023 4	Padova	2–0	Novara	Padova
20:45 CEST (UTC+2)				Stadium: Stadio Euganeo

24 September 2023 5	Novara	1–1	Giana Erminio	Novara
14:00 CEST (UTC+2)				Stadium: Stadio Silvio Piola

29 September 2023 6	Virtus Verona	1–1	Novara	Verona
20:45 CEST (UTC+2)				Stadium: Stadio Gavagnin-Nocini

7 October 2023 7	Pro Sesto	0–0	Novara	Sesto San Giovanni
16:15 CEST (UTC+2)				Stadium: Stadio Ernesto Breda

13 October 2023 8	Novara	0–1	Arzignano Valchiampo	Novara
20:45 CEST (UTC+2)			Parigi 39'	Stadium: Stadio Silvio Piola

21 October 2023 9	Mantova	2–1	Novara	Mantua
18:30 CEST (UTC+2)	Celesia 79'; Giacomelli 90+1'		Bertoncini 63'	Stadium: Stadio Danilo Martelli

24 October 2023 10	Novara	2–3	Atalanta U23	Novara
20:30 CEST (UTC+2)	Donadio 22'; Caradonna 61'		Capone 48'; Gyabuaa 50'; Ghislandi 85'	Stadium: Stadio Silvio Piola

28 October 2023 11	Renate	2–2	Novara	Meda
18:30 CEST (UTC+2)	Sartore 40'; Sorrentino 42'		D'Orazio 73'; Scappini 90+5'	Stadium: Stadio Città di Meda

4 November 2023 12	Novara	0–3	AlbinoLeffe	Novara
18:30 CET (UTC+1)			Doumbia 2'; Arrighini 6' (pen.); Zoma 90+1' (pen.)	Stadium: Stadio Silvio Piola

13 November 2023 13	Pro Vercelli	3–3	Novara	Vercelli
20:45 CET (UTC+1)				Stadium: Stadio Silvio Piola

19 November 2023 14	Novara	2–1	Pergolettese	Novara
14:00 CET (UTC+1)	D'Orazio 55' (pen.); Rossetti 90+3' (pen.)		Figoli 17'	Stadium: Stadio Silvio Piola

26 November 2023 15	Lumezzane	1–1	Novara	Lumezzane
14:00 CET (UTC+1)	Spini 51'		Calcagni 90+1'	Stadium: Stadio Tullio Saleri

3 December 2023 16	Novara	2–2	Vicenza	Novara
14:00 CET (UTC+1)	Corti 31'; Scappini 90+7'		Franco Ferrari 80'; Costa 90+4'	Stadium: Stadio Silvio Piola

8 December 2023 17	Legnago Salus	1–1	Novara	Legnago
CET (UTC+1)				Stadium: Stadio Mario Sandrini

17 December 2023 18	Novara	2–3	Triestina	Novara
CET (UTC+1)				Stadium: Stadio Silvio Piola

22 December 2023 19	Fiorenzuola	1–2	Novara	Fiorenzuola d'Arda
CET (UTC+1)				Stadium: Stadio comunale

6 January 2024 20	Novara	1–0	Alessandria	Novara
14:00 CET (UTC+1)				Stadium: Stadio Silvio Piola

13 January 2024 21	Pro Patria	3–0	Novara	Busto Arsizio
18:30 CET (UTC+1)				Stadium: Stadio Carlo Speroni

21 January 2024 22	Trento	1–1	Novara	Trento
14:00 CET (UTC+1)				Stadium: Stadio Briamasco

28 January 2024 23	Novara	0–3	Padova	Novara
14:00 CET (UTC+1)				Stadium: Stadio Silvio Piola

3 February 2024 24	Giana Erminio	0–1	Novara	Gorgonzola
18:30 CET (UTC+1)				Stadium: Stadio Città di Gorgonzola

10 February 2024 25	Novara	1–0	Virtus Verona	Novara
18:30 CET (UTC+1)				Stadium: Stadio Silvio Piola

13 February 2024 26	Novara	1–0	Pro Sesto	Novara
18:30 CET (UTC+1)				Stadium: Stadio Silvio Piola

17 February 2024 27	Arzignano Valchiampo	0–0	Novara	Arzignano
16:15 CET (UTC+1)				Stadium: Stadio Tommaso Dal Molin

25 February 2024 28	Novara	1–1	Mantova	Novara
16:15 CET (UTC+1)				Stadium: Stadio Silvio Piola

2 March 2024 29	Atalanta U23	0–0	Novara	Caravaggio
18:30 CET (UTC+1)				Stadium: Stadio Comunale

6 March 2024 30	Novara	1–1	Renate	Novara
18:30 CET (UTC+1)				Stadium: Stadio Silvio Piola

10 March 2024 31	AlbinoLeffe	0–0	Novara	Zanica
18:30 CET (UTC+1)				Stadium: AlbinoLeffe Stadium

16 March 2024 32	Novara	2–2	Pro Vercelli	Novara
20:45 CET (UTC+1)				Stadium: Stadio Silvio Piola

24 March 2024 33	Pergolettese	1–1	Novara	Crema
14:00 CET (UTC+1)				Stadium: Stadio Giuseppe Voltini

30 March 2024 34	Novara	1–1	Lumezzane	Novara
16:15 CET (UTC+1)				Stadium: Stadio Silvio Piola

7 April 2024 35	Vicenza	2–1	Novara	Vicenza
18:30 CEST (UTC+2)	Ferrari 11' (pen.), 71' (pen.)		Urso 47'	Stadium: Stadio Romeo Menti

13 April 2024 36	Novara	2–0	Legnago Salus	Novara
18:30 CEST (UTC+2)	Bentivegna 38' (pen.); Urso 81'			Stadium: Stadio Silvio Piola

20 April 2024 37	Triestina	2–2	Novara	Trieste
18:30 CEST (UTC+2)	Moretti 30'; Vertainen 90+4'		Urso 27'; Ongaro 60'	Stadium: Stadio Nereo Rocco

28 April 2024 38	Novara	2–0	Fiorenzuola	Novara
16:30 CEST (UTC+2)	Urso 26', 45'			Stadium: Stadio Silvio Piola

==== Relegation play-out ====
12 May 2024 First leg	Fiorenzuola	v	Novara	Fiorenzuola d'Arda
18:00 CEST (UTC+2)				Stadium: Stadio comunale

19 May 2024 Second leg	Novara	v	Fiorenzuola	Novara
18:00 CEST (UTC+2)				Stadium: Stadio Silvio Piola

=== Coppa Italia Serie C ===
3 October 2023 First round	Fiorenzuola	2–3	Novara	Fiorenzuola d'Arda
18:30 CEST (UTC+2)	Omoregbe 10', 14'		Prinelli 20'; Gerardini 37'; Bonaccorsi 90+4'	Stadium: Stadio comunale

9 November 2023 Second round	Novara	1–2	Pontedera	Novara
18:30 CET (UTC+1)	Prinelli 87'; Rossetti (red card) 90+3'		Fossati 19'; Gagliardi 42'	Stadium: Stadio Silvio Piola
