= 1921–22 Milan FC season =

Italian football club season

Milan Football Club
1921–22 season
- President: Piero Pirelli
- Manager: Vacant position
- Stadium: Campo di viale Lombardia
- Italian Football Championship: 9th in the Group A of the Northern League
- Top goalscorer: League: Venerino Papa (10); All: Venerino Papa (10)
Home colours	Away colours

During the 1921–22 season Milan Football Club competed in the Italian Football Championship.

== Summary ==
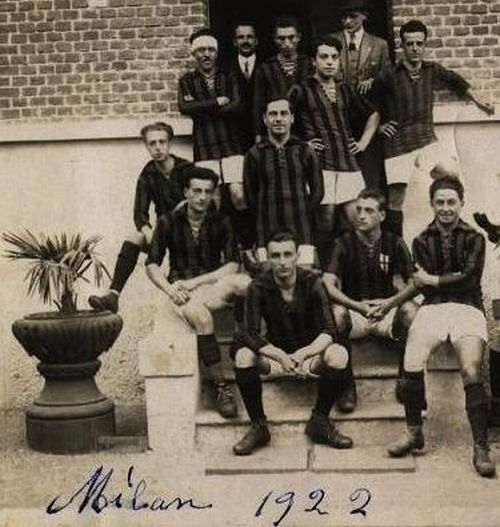
A Milan formation from the 1921-22 season.

This season, the Italian football championship was split in two competitions. This was due to the overwhelming number of participating teams, a problem never resolved in the previous years by the Italian football association, which convinced most of the main clubs to form a separate association, the Italian Football Confederation (CCI), and organize their own championship. All the major clubs, including Milan, participated in this tournament, while the smaller clubs competed in the regular Italian Football Federation championship. In the CCI championship, Milan finished ninth in Group A of the Northern League, having a disappointing season, with 11 defeats in 22 matches.

Cesare Lovati inherited the role of captain after the departure of Alessandro Scarioni in the previous season. Moreover, this season marked the arrival to the club of stricker Giuseppe Santagostino, who will continue his career for more than a decade with the Rossoneri, scoring 106 goals.

== Squad ==
Note: Flags indicate national team as defined under FIFA eligibility rules; some limited exceptions apply. Players may hold more than one non-FIFA nationality.

Pos.	Nation	Player
GK	ITA	Luigi Binda
GK	ITA	Eugenio Porrati
DF	ITA	Renzo Azaghi
DF	ITA	Umberto Soldati
DF	ITA	Arnaldo Giudici
MF	ITA	Giovanni Maggioni
MF	ITA	Alfredo De Franceschini
MF	ITA	Amilcare Della Noce
MF	ITA	Pietro Bronzini
MF	ITA	Renzo Monti
MF	ITA	Francesco Soldera

Pos.	Nation	Player
MF	ITA	Ernesto Morandi
MF	ARG	Cesare Lovati (Captain)
MF	ITA	Ferdinando Trabattoni
FW	ITA	Giampiero Murer
FW	ITA	Natale Loiacono
FW	ITA	Venerino Papa
FW	ITA	Luigi Poggia
FW	ITA	Giuseppe Santagostino
FW	ITA	Gustavo Zacchi
FW	ITA	Giovanni Mazzoni
FW	ITA	Mario Roghi

=== Transfers ===
In
Pos.	Name	from	Type
DF	Renzo Monti	US Milanese	-
FW	Giampiero Murer	AC Libertas	-
FW	Venerino Papa	Alessandria	-
MF	Luigi Poggia	AC Libertas	-
GK	Eugenio Porrati	Alessandria	-
FW	Giuseppe Santagostino	Juventus Italia	-
DF	Umberto Soldati	AC Libertas	-

Out
Pos.	Name	To	Type
MF	Gaetano Augusto Avanzini	Enotria Goliardo	-
FW	Carlo Bozzi	Enotria Goliardo	-
FW	Romolo Ferrario	Enotria Goliardo	-
MF	Alessandro Scarioni	US Milanese	-
GK	Antonio Travelli	ASSI Milano	-

== Competitions ==
=== Italian Football Championship ===
==== Group A - Northern League ====
2 October 1921 1	Milan	0-5	Novara	Milan
			35' Fornero; 49' Patti; 65' Marucco; 87', 89' Mattuteia	Stadium: Campo di viale Lombardia; Referee: Luigi Barnabò

9 October 1921 2	Vicenza	0-3	Milan	Vicenza
			(?) (?) Santagostino (?) Papa III	Stadium: Campo di Borgo San Felice; Referee: Guido Sarto

16 October 1921 3	Milan	1-3	Juventus	Milan
	Santagostino 6'		3' (o.g.) Lovati; 20' Marchi; 61' Gallo	Stadium: Campo di viale Lombardia; Referee: Sante Sanguineti

23 October 1921 4	Livorno	3-2	Milan	Livorno
	Anichini 20'; Innocenti 27'; Nigiotti 44'		56' Papa III; 81' Roghi	Stadium: Campo di Villa Chayes; Referee: Giovanni Battista Vagge

30 October 1921 5	Milan	1-0	Pro Vercelli	Milan
	Santagostino 75'			Stadium: Campo di viale Lombardia; Referee: Giuseppe Varetto

6 November 1921 6	US Milanese	0-0	Milan	Milan
				Stadium: Campo di viale Lombardia; Referee: Achille Gama

13 November 1921 7	Milan	0-0	Andrea Doria	Milan
				Stadium: Campo di viale Lombardia; Referee: Spartaco Majani

20 November 1921 8	Milan	2-1	Bologna	Milan
	Santagostino 15', 75'		25' Baldi	Stadium: Campo di viale Lombardia; Referee: Fortunato Olivari

27 November 1921 9	Verona	2-1	Milan	Verona
	Gemò 35', 84'		63' Papa III	Stadium: Campo di Borgo Venezia; Referee: Giovanni Canestrini

4 December 1921 10	Milan	2-2	Mantova	Milan
	Loiacono 17'; Poggia 87'		54' Venturini; 76' Agostinelli	Stadium: Campo di viale Lombardia; Referee: Felice Brunetti

11 December 1921 11	Spezia	1-2	Milan	La Spezia
	Calzolari 12' (pen.)		25', 79' Papa III	Stadium: Campo Sportivo Municipale; Referee: Fortunato Olivari

18 December 1921 12	Novara	3-2	Milan	Novara
	Fornero 3'; Migliavacca 58'; Mattuteia 76'		15' Trabattoni; 47' Lovati	Stadium: Campo di via Lombroso; Referee: Carlo Dani

22 January 1922 13	Milan	7-0	Vicenza	Milan
	Papa III 5', 14', 55'; Poggia 40'; Loiacono 50'; Zacchi 70', 75'			Stadium: Campo di viale Lombardia; Referee: Giuseppe Venegoni

5 February 1922 15	Milan	1-2	Livorno	Milan
	Papa III 28'		32' (pen.) Scotti; 60' Innocenti II	Stadium: Campo di viale Lombardia; Referee: Felice Brunetti

19 February 1922 17	Milan	2-0	US Milanese	Milan
	Loiacono 30'; Papa III 61'			Stadium: Campo di viale Lombardia; Referee: Sante Sanguineti

26 February 1922 18ª giornata	Andrea Doria	1-2	Milan	Genova
	Dellacasa 30'		7', 76' Poggia	Stadium: Campo sportivo della Cajenna; Referee: Giovanni Canestrini

5 March 1922 19	Bologna	4-0	Milan	Bologna
	Alberti 15', 59'; Rubini 30'; Crespi 35'			Stadium: stadium Sterlino; Referee: Giuseppe Venegoni

12 March 1922 20	Milan	0-1	Verona	Milan
			5' Chiecchi II	Stadium: Campo di viale Lombardia; Referee: Amedeo Guarnieri

26 March 1922 22	Milan	0-1	Spezia	Milan
			60' Morando I	Stadium: Campo di viale Lombardia; Referee: Sante Sanguineti

9 April 1922 14	Juventus	0-0	Milan	Torino
				Stadium: stadium di Corso Sebastopoli; Referee: Giovanni Battista Vagge

30 April 1922 16	Pro Vercelli	5-0	Milan	Vercelli
	Rampini II 30', 34' (?); Borello 50'; Lavarino (?)			Stadium: Campo piazza Conte di Torino; Referee: Giovanni Battista Vagge

7 May 1922 21	Mantova	2-1	Milan	Mantova
	Agostinelli 20', 59'		27' Papa III	Stadium: Campo Ippodromo Te; Referee: Achille Gama

== Statistics ==
=== Squad statistics ===
Competition	Points	Home						Away						Total						GD
Competition	Points	G	W	D	L	Gs	Ga	G	W	D	L	Gs	Ga	G	W	D	L	Gs	Ga	GD
1921–22 Prima Divisione	18	11	4	2	5	16	15	11	3	2	6	13	21	22	7	4	11	29	36	-7

=== Players statistics ===
No.	Pos	Nat	Player	Total		Italian Football Championship	
No.	Pos	Nat	Player	Apps	Goals	Apps	Goals
	GK	(Italy) ITA	Luigi Binda	20	-33	20	-33
	GK	(Italy) ITA	Eugenio Porrati	2	-3	2	-3
	DF	(Italy) ITA	Umberto Soldati	12	0	12	0
	DF	(Italy) ITA	Arnaldo Giudici	1	0	1	0
	DF	(Italy) ITA	Renzo Azaghi	4	0	4	0
	DF	(Italy) ITA	Ferdinando Trabattoni	3	1	3	1
	MF	(Argentina) ARG	Cesare Lovati	22	1	22	1
	MF	(Italy) ITA	Pietro Bronzini	21	0	21	0
	MF	(Italy) ITA	Renzo Monti	6	0	6	0
	MF	(Italy) ITA	Amilcare Della Noce	3	0	3	0
	MF	(Italy) ITA	Ernesto Morandi	21	0	21	0
	MF	(Italy) ITA	Alfredo De Franceschini	2	0	2	0
	MF	(Italy) ITA	Francesco Soldera	20	0	20	0
	MF	(Italy) ITA	Giovanni Maggioni	2	0	2	0
	FW	(Italy) ITA	Luigi Poggia	15	4	15	4
	FW	(Italy) ITA	Mario Roghi	13	1	13	1
	FW	(Italy) ITA	Natale Loiacono	21	3	21	3
	FW	(Italy) ITA	Giuseppe Santagostino	10	5	10	5
	FW	(Italy) ITA	Gustavo Zacchi	8	2	8	2
	FW	(Italy) ITA	Venerino Papa	20	10	20	10
	FW	(Italy) ITA	Giovanni Mazzoni	1	0	1	0
	FW	(Italy) ITA	Giampiero Murer	15	0	15	0

== See also ==
- AC Milan

== Bibliography ==
- Almanacco illustrato del Milan, ed: 2, March 2005. Panini.
- Enrico Tosi. La storia del Milan, May 2005. Italia/Italy cid Tosi.
- Milan. Sempre con te, December 2009. Mondadori. 2009. ISBN 978-88-04-59118-4.
