= 1923–24 Milan FC season =

Italian football club season

Milan Football Club
1923–24 season
- President: Piero Pirelli
- Manager: Heinrich Oppenheim
- Stadium: Campo di viale Lombardia
- Italian Football Championship: 9th in the Group B of the Northern League
- Top goalscorer: League: Giuseppe Santagostino (16); All: Giuseppe Santagostino (16)
Home colours	Away colours

During the 1923–24 season Milan Football Club competed in the Italian Football Championship.

== Summary ==
The club played an unimpressive season, finishing ninth out of 12 teams in Group B of the Northern Italy qualifiers: this finish was the result of 10 defeats in 22 matches. Topscorer was once again Giuseppe Santagostino, with 16 goals. This season, Milan changed headquarters for the fourth time, moving from the Birreria Colombo in Via Foscolo 2 to the Bar Vittorio Emanuele in Corsia dei Servi.

== Squad ==
Note: Flags indicate national team as defined under FIFA eligibility rules; some limited exceptions apply. Players may hold more than one non-FIFA nationality.

Pos.	Nation	Player
GK	ITA	Luigi Binda
GK	ITA	Bruno Midali
GK	ITA	Umberto Mazzucchelli
DF	ITA	Arnaldo Giudici
DF	ITA	Umberto Soldati
MF	ITA	Tiziano Ballarin
MF	ITA	Alfredo De Franceschini
MF	ITA	Bruno Carcano
MF	ITA	Pietro Bronzini
MF	ITA	Carlo Innocente Baj
MF	ITA	Francesco Soldera (Captain)

Pos.	Nation	Player
MF	ITA	Ernesto Morandi
MF	ITA	Antonio Da Sacco
MF	ITA	Alessandro Savelli
MF	ITA	Oreste Perfetti
FW	ITA	Enrico Forneris
FW	ITA	Venerino Papa
FW	ITA	Luigi Poggia
FW	ITA	Giuseppe Santagostino
FW	ITA	Gustavo Zacchi
FW	ITA	Carlo Cevenini
FW	ITA	Gustavo Gay

=== Transfers ===
In
Pos.	Name	from	Type
GK	Luigi Binda	Novara	-
FW	Carlo Cevenini	Crema	-
GK	Ercole Vampa	Pastore	-

Out
Pos.	Name	To	Type
DF	Eugenio Allievi	Fanfulla	-
FW	Dionigi Corsi	Internazionale Napoli	-
MF	Bassano Daccò	Fanfulla	-

== Competitions ==
=== Italian Football Championship ===
==== Group B - Northern League ====
7 October 1923 1	Milan	0-3	Torino	Milano
			12' Schönfeld; 31', 33' Falchi	Stadium: Campo di Viale Lombardia; Referee: Carlo Dani

14 October 1923 2	Legnano	2-2	Milan	Legnano
	Malaspina 53'; Allemandi 77'		59' (pen.) Santagostino; 71' Ballarin	Stadium: stadium Comunale; Referee: Giacomo Pinasco

21 October 1923 3	Milan	1-0	Bologna	Milano
	Savelli 76'			Stadium: Campo di Viale Lombardia; Referee: Augusto Rangone

28 October 1923 4	Andrea Doria	1-1	Milan	Genova
	Calzolari 52' (pen.)		89' V. Papa	Stadium: Campo sportivo della Cajenna; Referee: Luigi Portigliatti

4 November 1923 5	Milan	1-3	Pro Vercelli	Milano
	Santagostino 43'		19', 72' Rosso; 28' Borello	Stadium: Campo di Viale Lombardia; Referee: Ermete Alfieri

11 November 1923 6	Spezia	2-1	Milan	La Spezia
	Tognotti 30' (pen.); Riccobaldi 77'		72' V. Papa	Stadium: stadium Alberto Picco; Referee: Gaetano Ricci

18 November 1923 7	Pisa	2-2	Milan	Pisa
	Colombari 15'; Sbrana 76' (pen.)		75' (pen.), 85' (pen.) Santagostino	Stadium: stadium Arena Garibaldi; Referee: Giuseppe Germani

25 November 1923 8	Milan	0-1	Cremonese	Milano
			85' Albertoni	Stadium: Campo di Viale Lombardia; Referee: Achille Gama

2 December 1923 9	SPAL	1-1	Milan	Ferrara
	Bay 83'		54' G. Gay	Stadium: Campo di piazza d'armi Referee: Gerardo Bortoletti

9 December 1923 10	Milan	2-1	Verona	Milano
	Santagostino 49', 53'		23' G. Chiecchi	Stadium: Campo di Viale Lombardia; Referee: Sante Sanguineti

16 December 1923 11	Novese	1-2	Milan	Novi Ligure
	Mandosso 20' (pen.)		5' Santagostino; 80' G. Gay	Stadium: Campo di Piazza d'Armi; Referee: Giacomo Pinasco

6 January 1924 12	Torino	3-3	Milan	Torino
	Schönfeld 1', 39'; Janni 31'		20' C. Cevenini; 48' Savelli; 78' G. Gay	Stadium: Campo Stradale Stupinigi; Referee: Ermete Alfieri

27 January 1924 13	Milan	2-1	Legnano	Milano
	Savelli 4', 88'		67' Malaspina	Stadium: Campo di Viale Lombardia; Referee: Giovanni Mauro

3 February 1924 14	Bologna	4-0	Milan	Bologna
	Schiavio 47'; Pozzi 49'; Martelli 50'; Della Valle 69'			Stadium: stadium Sterlino; Referee: Carlo Dani

10 February 1924 15	Milan	1-2	Andrea Doria	Milano
	Santagostino 39' (pen.)		8' Merlini; 51' Bagnasco	Stadium: Campo di Viale Lombardia; Referee: Giuseppe Germani

17 February 1924 16	Pro Vercelli	2-1	Milan	Vercelli
	Zanello 6'; Sarasso 25'		31' C. Cevenini	Stadium: Campo piazza Conte di Torino; Referee: Carlo Dani

24 February 1924 17	Milan	3-1	Spezia	Milano
	V. Papa 27'; Savelli 35', 53'		47' Romano	Stadium: Campo di Viale Lombardia; Referee: Bruno Bellini

2 March 1924 18	Milan	5-1	Pisa	Milano
	Soldera 4'; Santagostino 58' (pen.), 86'; C. Cevenini 63'; Savelli 70'		11' Sbrana	Stadium: Campo di Viale Lombardia; Referee: Luigi Portigliatti

16 March 1924 19	Cremonese	4-1	Milan	Cremona
	E. Bodini 11'; Albertoni 35'; Bonzio (?)		79' (pen.) Santagostino	Stadium: Campo di Via Persico; Referee: Uwel Pierallini

23 March 1924 20	Milan	3-4	SPAL	Milano
	Santagostino 46', 56'; V. Papa 63'		7' Ticozzelli; 20' Il. Preti; 30', 34' Serra Zanetti	Stadium: Campo di Viale Lombardia; Referee: Sante Sanguineti

30 March 1924 21	Verona	5-1	Milan	Verona
	Bosio 43'; Franzoni 55'; Recchia 60'; G. Chiecchi 65'; Zacchero 68'		18' Savelli	Stadium: stadium di Piazza Cittadella; Referee: Franciosini

13 April 1924 22	Milan	5-0	Novese	Milano
	Santagostino 4', 75'; C. Cevenini 16'; Savelli 43', 79'			Stadium: Campo di Viale Lombardia; Referee: Gaetano Ricci

== Statistics ==
=== Squad statistics ===
Competition	Points	Home						Away						Total						GD
Competition	Points	G	W	D	L	Gs	Ga	G	W	D	L	Gs	Ga	G	W	D	L	Gs	Ga	GD
1923–24 Prima Divisione	19	11	6	0	5	23	17	11	1	5	5	15	27	22	7	5	10	38	44	-6

=== Players statistics ===
No.	Pos	Nat	Player	Total		Italian Football Championship	
No.	Pos	Nat	Player	Apps	Goals	Apps	Goals
	GK	(Italy) ITA	Bruno Midali	19	-40	19	-40
	GK	(Italy) ITA	Luigi Binda	2	-2	2	-2
	GK	(Italy) ITA	Umberto Mazzucchelli	1	-2	1	-2
	DF	(Italy) ITA	Umberto Soldati	21	0	21	0
	DF	(Italy) ITA	Arnaldo Giudici	1	0	1	0
	DF	(Italy) ITA	Alessandro Savelli	21	10	21	10
	MF	(Italy) ITA	Tiziano Ballarin	22	0	22	0
	MF	(Italy) ITA	Pietro Bronzini	21	0	21	0
	MF	(Italy) ITA	Bruno Carcano	2	0	2	0
	MF	(Italy) ITA	Carlo Innocente Baj	1	0	1	0
	MF	(Italy) ITA	Ernesto Morandi	2	0	2	0
	MF	(Italy) ITA	Oreste Perfetti	6	0	6	0
	MF	(Italy) ITA	Alfredo De Franceschini	3	0	3	0
	MF	(Italy) ITA	Francesco Soldera	22	1	22	1
	MF	(Italy) ITA	Antonio Da Sacco	12	0	12	0
	FW	(Italy) ITA	Luigi Poggia	22	0	22	0
	FW	(Italy) ITA	Enrico Forneris	1	0	1	0
	FW	(Italy) ITA	Carlo Cevenini	12	4	12	4
	FW	(Italy) ITA	Giuseppe Santagostino	21	16	21	16
	FW	(Italy) ITA	Gustavo Zacchi	4	0	4	0
	FW	(Italy) ITA	Venerino Papa	14	4	14	4
	FW	(Italy) ITA	Gustavo Gay	12	3	12	3

== See also ==
- AC Milan

== Bibliography ==
- Almanacco illustrato del Milan, ed: 2, March 2005. Panini.
- Enrico Tosi. La storia del Milan, May 2005. Italia/Italy cid Tosi.
- Milan. Sempre con te, December 2009. Mondadori. 2009. ISBN 978-88-04-59118-4.
