= 2025–26 Novara FC season =

Italian football club season 2025-26

Novara FC
2025–26 season
- Manager: Andrea Zanchetta
- Stadium: Stadio Silvio Piola
- Serie C: 13th
- Coppa Italia Serie C: First round

The 2025–26 season is the 118th in the history of Novara Football Club and the club’s fourth consecutive season in Serie C of the Italian football leagues. In addition to the domestic league, Novara competes in the Coppa Italia Serie C. The season began on 17 August 2025.

== Squad ==
No.	Name	Position	Nationality	Age	Joined
	Elia Boseggia	GK	Italy		
	Rossetti	GK	Italy		
	Matteo Raffaelli	GK	Italy		
	Citi	DF	Italy		
	D'Alessio	DF	Italy		
	Davide Dell'Erba	DF	Germany		
	Deseri	DF	Italy		
	Omar Khailoti	DF	Morocco		
	Sylvester Lartey	DF	Ghana		
	Lorenzini	DF	Italy		
	Andrea Valdesi	DF	Italy		
	Arboscello	MF	Italy		
	Collodel	MF	Italy		
	Cortese	MF	Italy		
	Leonardo Di Cosmo	MF	Italy		
	Nicolò Ledonne	MF	Italy		
	Ranieri	MF	Italy		
	Mattia Malaspina	MF	Italy		
	Alberti	FW	Italy		
	Da Graca	FW	Italy		
	Donadio	FW	Italy		
	Giovanni Perini	FW	Italy		

=== Transfers In ===
Pos.	Player	Transferred from	Fee	Date	Source
DF	(Italy) Edoardo De Mori	(Italy) Bari U19	Loan return	30 June 2025	
DF	(Ghana) Sylvester Lartey	(Italy) Cairese	Loan return	30 June 2025	
GK	(Brazil) João Vitor	(Italy) Cairese	Loan return	30 June 2025	
GK	(Italy) Elia Boseggia	(Italy) Hellas Verona	Undisclosed	1 July 2025	
MF	(Italy) Nicolò Ledonne	(Italy) Juventus Next Gen	Undisclosed	9 July 2025	
MF	(Germany) Davide Dell'Erba	(Germany) FC Bayern Munich II	Undisclosed	24 July 2025	
MF	(Italy) Leonardo Di Cosmo	(Italy) Trento	Free	10 August 2025	
FW	(Italy) Giovanni Perini	(Italy) Cesena U20	Loan	12 August 2025	
DF	(Italy) Andrea Valdesi	(Italy) Giugliano	Undisclosed	14 August 2025	
FW	(Italy) Eric Lanini	(Italy) Benevento	Free	21 August 2025	
GK	(Italy) Matteo Raffaelli	(Italy) Ascoli	Loan	31 August 2025	
MF	(Italy) Mattia Malaspina	(Italy) Milan Futuro	Undisclosed	1 September 2025	

=== Transfers Out ===
Pos.	Player	Transferred to	Fee	Date	Source
FW	(Belgium) Hemsley Akpa-Chukwu	(Italy) Bari	Loan return	30 June 2025	
MF	(Italy) Alessandro Di Munno	(Italy) Pro Patria	Undisclosed	8 August 2025	
MF	(Slovenia) Enej Jelenič	(Slovenia) Koper	Contract terminated	12 August 2025	
MF	(Italy) Filippo Gerardini	(Italy) Grosseto	Contract terminated	12 August 2025	
GK	(Brazil) João Vitor	(Italy) Enna	Free	17 August 2025	
GK	(Canada) Axel Desjardins	(Italy) Taranto	Free	17 August 2025	
DF	(Italy) Edoardo De Mori	(Italy) Fasano	Undisclosed	28 August 2025	
FW	(Italy) Simone Andrea Ganz	(Italy) Pro Patria	Contract terminated	1 September 2025	
MF	(Italy) Tommaso Maressa	(Italy) Bra	Undisclosed	1 September 2025	
MF	(Italy) Riccardo Calcagni	(Italy) Monopoli	Contract terminated	1 September 2025	
GK	(Italy) Edoardo Negri	(Italy) Acireale	Undisclosed	1 September 2025	

== Friendlies ==
6 August 2025	Sampdoria	0–0	Novara

== Competitions ==
=== Overall record ===
Competition	First match	Last match	Starting round	Final position	Record							
Competition	First match	Last match	Starting round	Final position	Pld	W	D	L	GF	GA	GD	Win %
Serie C	25 August 2025	26 April 2026	Matchday 1		5	0	4	1	3	4	−1	0.00
Coppa Italia Serie C	17 August 2025		First round	First round	1	0	0	1	0	1	−1	0.00
Total					6	0	4	2	3	5	−2	0.00

Last updated: 21 September 2025
Source: Competitions

=== Serie C ===
Group A

==== Results summary ====
Overall								Home						Away					
Pld	W	D	L	GF	GA	GD	Pts	W	D	L	GF	GA	GD	W	D	L	GF	GA	GD
5	0	4	1	3	4	−1	4	0	2	1	2	3	−1	0	2	0	1	1	0

Last updated: 21 September 2025.

==== Results by round ====
Round	1	2	3	4	5	6
Ground	H	A	H	A	H	A
Result	D	D	D	D	L	
Position	10	13				

Updated to match(es) played on 21 September 2025. Source:
A = Away; H = Home; W = Win; D = Draw; L = Loss

==== Matches ====
The competition draw was held on 28 July 2025.

25 August 2025 1	Novara	1–1	Inter U23	Novara
20:30 UTC+2	Da Graca 64'		Topalović 23'	Stadium: Stadio Silvio Piola; Attendance: 2,147; Referee: Giorgio Bozzetto

31 August 2025 2	Dolomiti Bellunesi	1–1	Novara	Fontanafredda
15:30 UTC+2	Toçi 33'		Da Graca 16'	Stadium: Stadio Omero Tognon; Attendance: 662; Referee: Bruno Spina

7 September 2025 3	Novara	1–1	Trento	Novara
15:00 UTC+2	Alberti 39'		Aucelli (yellow card) 10' (yellow-red card) 67'; Giannotti 37'	Stadium: Stadio Silvio Piola; Attendance: 1,835; Referee: Gioele Iacobellis

14 September 2025 4	Pro Patria	0–0	Novara	Busto Arsizio
17:30 UTC+2	Masi (yellow card) 47' (yellow-red card) 63'; Giudici (red card) 82'			Stadium: Stadio Carlo Speroni; Attendance: 1,352; Referee: Alfredo Iannello

21 September 2025 5	Novara	0–1	Pro Vercelli	Novara
15:00 UTC+2			Sow 45'	Stadium: Stadio Silvio Piola; Referee: Erminio Cerbasi

25 September 2025 6	Union Brescia	v	Novara	Brescia
20:45 UTC+2				Stadium: Stadio Mario Rigamonti

=== Coppa Italia Serie C ===
17 August 2025 First round	Juventus Next Gen	1–0	Novara	Alessandria
18:00 UTC+2	Guerra 67'			Stadium: Stadio Giuseppe Moccagatta; Referee: Michele Pasculli
