= List of Delfino Pescara 1936 seasons =

Delfino Pescara 1936 is an Italian professional football club based in Pescara, Abruzzo, who play their matches in Stadio Adriatico – Giovanni Cornacchia. The club was formed in 1936 and the club's formal debut in an official league was also in 1936.

The club has won the Serie B 2 times and the Serie C 2 times.

Delfino Pescara 1936 has played 6 seasons in the Serie A, 35 seasons in the Serie B, 25 seasons in the Serie C (or equivalent), 10 seasons in the Serie D (or equivalent) and 1 season in lower competitions.

This list details the club's achievements in major competitions, and the top scorers for each season. Top scorers in bold were also the top scorers in the Italian league that season. Records of local or regional competitions are not included due to them being considered of less importance.

== Key ==
- P = Played
- W = Games won
- D = Games drawn
- L = Games lost
- F = Goals for
- A = Goals against
- Pts = Points
- Pos = Final position
- Serie A = 1st Tier in Italian League
- Serie B = 2nd Tier in Italian League
- Serie C = 3rd Tier in Italian League
- Prima Categoria = 1st Tier until 1922
- Promozione = 2nd Tier until 1922
- Prima Divisione = 1st Tier until 1926
- Prima Divisione = 2nd Tier 1926 - 1929
- Seconda Divisione = 2nd Tier until 1926
- Seconda Divisione = 3rd Tier 1926 - 1929
- Divisione Nazionale = 1st Tier 1926 - 1929
- RU = Runner-Up
- SF = Semi-finals
- QF = Quarter-finals
- R16 = Last 16
- R32 = Last 32
- QR1 = First Qualifying Round
- QR2 = Second Qualifying Round
- QR3 = Third Qualifying Round
- PO = Play-Offs
- 1R = Round 1
- 2R = Round 2
- 3R = Round 3
- GS = Group Stage
- 2GS = 2nd Group Stage
- EC = European Cup (1955-1992)
- UCL = UEFA Champions League (1993-....)
- CWC = UEFA Cup Winners' Cup (1960-1999)
- UC = UEFA cup (1971-2008)
- UEL = UEFA Europa League (2009-....)
- USC = UEFA Super Cup
- INT = FIFA Intercontinental Cup (1960-2004)
- WC = FIFA Club World Cup (2005-....)

**Champions**	Runners-up	Promoted	Relegated	1st Tier	2nd Tier	3rd Tier	4th Tier	5th Tier	6th Tier	7th Tier	8th Tier

== Seasons ==
Results of league and cup competitions by season
Season	Division	P	W	D	L	F	A	Pts	Pos	Cup	Supercoppa Italiana	Cup	Result	Name	Goals
Season	League									Cup	Supercoppa Italiana	UEFA - FIFA		Top goalscorer	
2019-20	Serie B (2)	38	12	9	17	48	55	45	17th	3R					
2018-19	Serie B (2)	36	14	13	9	50	46	55	4th	3R					
2017-18	Serie B (2)	42	11	15	16	50	64	48	17th	4R					
2016-17	Serie A (1)	38	3	9	26	37	81	18	20th	4R					
2015-16	Serie B (2)	42	21	9	12	69	52	72	4th	3R				Gianluca Lapadula	30
2014-15	Serie B (2)	42	16	13	13	69	55	61	7th	4R				Federico Melchiorri	14
2013-14	Serie B (2)	42	13	13	16	50	53	52	15th	4R				Riccardo Maniero	15
2012-13	Serie A (1)	38	6	4	28	27	84	22	20th	4R				Vladimír Weiss	5
2011-12	Serie B (2)	42	26	5	11	90	55	83	1st	2R				Ciro Immobile	28
2010-11	Serie B (2)	42	14	11	17	44	48	53	13th	2R				Marco Sansovini	13
2009-10	Lega Pro Prima Divisione Girone B (3)	34	15	13	6	39	25	58	2nd					Massimo Ganci	11
2008-09	Lega Pro Prima Divisione Girone B (3)	34	10	13	11	36	45	42	12th	2R				Lucas Simon	10
2007-08	Serie C1 Girone B (3)	34	15	9	10	47	36	53	7th					Marco Sansovini	16
2006-07	Serie B (2)	42	5	10	27	36	77	24	22nd	2R				Marco Martini	9
2005-06	Serie B (2)	42	14	12	16	41	50	54	11th	1R				Davide Matteini	9
2004-05	Serie B (2)	42	10	16	16	43	61	46	19th	GS				Federico Giampaolo	7
2003-04	Serie B (2)	46	11	13	22	46	69	46	22nd	GS				Emanuele Calaiò	21
2002-03	Serie C1 Girone B (3)	34	19	9	6	62	38	66	2nd	GS				Andrea Cecchini	20
2001-02	Serie C1 Girone B (3)	34	13	14	7	48	29	53	4th	GS				Massimiliano Fanesi	11
2000-01	Serie B (2)	38	3	13	22	30	56	22	20th	GS				Ivan Tisci	6
1999-00	Serie B (2)	38	10	17	11	62	55	47	13th	R32				Federico Giampaolo	12
1998-99	Serie B (2)	38	18	9	11	50	42	63	5th	1R				Michele Gelsi	13
1997-98	Serie B (2)	38	12	11	15	41	48	47	13th	2R				Michele Gelsi	8
1996-97	Serie B (2)	38	14	12	12	50	38	54	6th	3R				Federico Giampaolo	18
1995-96	Serie B (2)	38	13	11	14	47	50	50	9th	2R				Andrea Carnevale	10
1994-95	Serie B (2)	38	11	13	14	50	63	46	11th	1R				Dario Di Giannatale	8
1993-94	Serie B (2)	38	12	14	12	50	54	35	15th	1R				Andrea Carnevale	14
1992-93	Serie A (1)	34	6	5	23	47	75	17	18th	2R				Massimiliano Allegri	12
1991-92	Serie B (2)	38	15	16	7	58	43	46	2nd	1R				Edi Bivi	17
1990-91	Serie B (2)	38	9	18	11	36	32	36	14th	2R				Edi Bivi	10
1989-90	Serie B (2)	38	14	11	13	34	39	39	9th	3R				Pasquale Traini	10
1988-89	Serie A (1)	34	5	17	12	28	43	27	16th	2R				Tita	16
1987-88	Serie A (1)	30	8	8	14	27	44	24	14th	R16				Blaz Sliskovic	13
1986-87	Serie B (2)	38	16	12	10	43	33	44	1st	1R				Stefano Rebonato	22
1985-86	Serie B (2)	38	10	13	15	33	37	33	17th	1R				Stefano Rebonato	9
1984-85	Serie B (2)	38	12	14	12	38	35	38	7th	1R				Giuseppe De Martino	12
1983-84	Serie B (2)	38	13	10	15	41	48	36	12th	1R				Sandro Tovalieri	10
1982-83	Serie C1 Girone B (3)	34	18	10	6	38	20	46	2nd	1R				Sauro Massi	9
1981-82	Serie B (2)	38	4	9	25	20	57	17	20th	1R				Mauro Amenta; Walter Mazzarri	4
1980-81	Serie B (2)	38	14	13	11	35	38	41	6th	1R				Massimo Silva	14
1979-80	Serie A (1)	30	4	8	18	18	47	16	14th	1R				Bruno Nobili	6
1978-79	Serie B (2)	38	16	16	6	44	27	48	3rd	1R				Bartolomeo Di Michele	10
1977-78	Serie A (1)	30	4	9	17	21	44	17	16th	GS				Bruno Nobili	9
1976-77	Serie B (2)	38	17	15	6	48	29	49	3rd	GS				Bruno Nobili; Andrea Prunecchi	9
1975-76	Serie B (2)	38	12	14	12	25	32	38	14th	GS				Bortolo Mutti	8
1974-75	Serie B (2)	38	9	18	11	37	38	36	10th	GS				Bruno Nobili; Corrado Serato	10
1973-74	Serie C Girone C (3)	38	19	16	3	43	17	54	1st					Corrado Serato	9
1972-73	Serie D Girone H (4)	34	21	10	3	49	18	52	1st					Roberto Rigotto	10
1971-72	Serie C Girone C (3)	38	9	16	13	32	34	34	18th					Loris De Carolis	8
1970-71	Serie C Girone C (3)	38	13	10	15	25	27	36	12th					Gianni Palanca	5
1969-70	Serie C Girone C (3)	38	10	17	11	26	24	37	9th					Leonardo Di Francesco	6
1968-69	Serie C Girone C (3)	38	8	19	11	24	30	35	15th					Vincenzo Morganelli	7
1967-68	Serie C Girone C (3)	36	14	11	11	36	28	39	6th					Raffaello Ciocca	8
1966-67	Serie C Girone C (3)	34	15	6	13	33	29	36	6th					Gabriele Guizzo	9
1965-66	Serie C Girone C (3)	34	11	11	12	37	36	33	9th					Gabriele Guizzo	9
1964-65	Serie C Girone C (3)	34	11	10	13	27	32	32	11th					Bruno Meneghetti; Attilio Pieri	4
1963-64	Serie C Girone C (3)	34	9	13	12	30	27	31	10th					Aristide Zucchinali	9
1962-63	Serie C Girone C (3)	34	13	12	9	37	38	38	5th					Aristide Zucchinali	9
1961-62	Serie C Girone C (3)	34	11	10	13	29	30	32	10th					Giorgio Ive	6
1960-61	Serie C Girone C (3)	34	14	3	17	40	38	31	12th					Antonio Marangi	9
1959-60	Serie C Girone C (3)	34	12	8	14	38	30	32	10th					Farnese Masoni	12
1958-59	Serie C Girone B (3)	34	11	6	17	31	38	28	14th	1R				Farnese Masoni	12
1957-58	Prima Categoria Girone B (4)	30	16	7	7	50	29	39	3rd					n/a	
1956-57	IV Serie Girone G (4)	34	17	9	8	62	34	43	5th					n/a	
1955-56	IV Serie Girone G (4)	34	22	5	7	78	26	49	1st					n/a	
1954-55	IV Serie Girone G (4)	34	18	9	7	54	28	45	3rd					n/a	
1953-54	IV Serie Girone F (4)	30	17	5	8	54	34	39	3rd					n/a	
1952-53	IV Serie Girone G (4)	30	9	8	13	38	42	26	12th					n/a	
1951-52	Promozione Lega Interregionale Center Girone L (4)	32	23	6	3	82	32	52	1st					n/a	
1950-51	Promozione Lega Interregionale Center Girone L (4)	34	20	9	5	70	32	49	2nd					n/a	
1949-50	Serie C Girone C (3)	40	14	8	18	43	62	36	17th					n/a	
1948-49	Serie B (2)	42	11	12	19	49	71	34	22nd					Giuseppe Rinaldi	20
1947-48	Serie B Girone C (2)	34	16	6	12	49	42	38	7th					Giuseppe Rinaldi; Algiso Toscani	10
1946-47	Serie B Girone C (2)	32	15	7	10	61	35	37	3rd					Giuseppe Rinaldi	17
1945-46	Serie A-B Centro-Sud (1-2)	20	6	6	8	27	26	18	6th					Mario Tontodonati	10
1944-45	World War II														
1943-44	World War II														
1942-43	Serie B (2)	32	11	9	12	44	50	31	9th	R32				Carlo Guarnieri	11
1941-42	Serie B (2)	34	20	6	8	48	24	46	3rd	R32				Mario Tontodonati	12
1940-41	Serie C Girone F (3); Girone Finale B	27; 6	18; 4	6; 0	3; 2	52; 9	14; 9	42; 8	1st 2nd	3R				n/a	
1939-40	Serie C Girone G (3)	28	12	9	7	54	41	33	7th	2R				n/a	
1938-39	Serie C Girone G (3)	20	6	5	9	29	42	17	8th	QR1				n/a	
1937-38	Prima Divisione Abbruzzese (4)	14						20	1st					n/a	
1936-37	Seconda Divisione Abbruzzese (5)								1st					n/a	
Total	**Serie A, Divisione Nazionale (1)**	**196**	**33**	**51**	**112**	**168**	**337**	**123 (150)**	**0x Champ**	**0x** **Coppa**	**0x** **Supercoppa**			**Tita**	**16**
Total	**Serie B (2)**	**1354**	**457**	**421**	**476**	**1611**	**1636**	**1542 (1792)**	**2x Champ**					**Gianluca Lapadula**	**30**
Total	**Serie C (3)**	**857**	**324**	**264**	**269**	**945**	**819**	**982 (1236)**	**1x Champ**					**Andrea Cecchini**	**20**
Total	**Serie D (4)**	**292**	**163**	**68**	**61**	**537**	**275**	**394 (557)**	**4x Champ**					**Roberto Rigotto**	**10**
