= Sartore =

Sartore is a surname. Notable people with the surname include:

- Francisco Sartore (born 1995), Brazilian footballer
- Giuseppe Sartore (1937–1995), Italian racing cyclist
- Joel Sartore (born 1962), American photographer, speaker, author, and teacher

== See also ==
- Sartori
