= Oussama M'Hamsi =

Moroccan footballer

Personal information
- Date of birth: 30 November 1998 (age 27)
- Place of birth: Rabat, Morocco
- Height: 1.84 m (6 ft 0 in)
- Position: Defender

Youth career
- –2019: Alessandria

Senior career*
Years	Team	Apps	(Gls)
2017–2019	→ Casale (loan)	68	(4)
2019–2020	Alessandria	2	(0)
- * Club domestic league appearances and goals as of 16 March 2020

Oussama M'Hamsi (born 30 November 1998) is a Moroccan footballer who plays as a defender.

== Career ==
=== Alessandria ===
Following a two-year loan spell with Casale in Serie D, M'Hamsi signed his first professional contract with Alessandria. He made his league debut for the club on 15 December 2019, coming on as a 71st-minute substitute for Francisco Sartore in a 2–1 home victory over Pro Vercelli.
