= Oliver Urso =

Danish footballer (born 1999)

Personal information
- Date of birth: 29 April 1999 (age 27)
- Place of birth: Copenhagen, Denmark
- Height: 1.81 m (5 ft 11 in)
- Position: Midfielder

Team information
- Current team: Lecco (on loan from Reggiana)
- Number: 11

Youth career
- BSV
- FC Copenhagen
- AS Roma
- 2012–2013: Tor Tre Teste
- 2013–2018: AC Cesena

Senior career*
Years	Team	Apps	(Gls)
2018	Salernitana	0	(0)
2018	→ Pro Piacenza (loan)	2	(0)
2019	Forlì	4	(1)
2019	Rimini	0	(0)
2019–2022	Viterbese	81	(1)
2022–2024	Novara	57	(8)
2024–	Reggiana	6	(0)
2026–	→ Lecco (loan)	11	(2)
- * Club domestic league appearances and goals as of 29 April 2026

Oliver Urso (born 29 April 1999) is a Danish professional footballer who plays as a midfielder for Serie C Group A club Lecco, on loan from Reggiana.

== Career ==
Born in Copenhagen, Denmark, Urso began his football career with BK Søllerød-Vedbæk, but later joined F.C Copenhagen's youth setup. At the age of nine, he relocated to Rome, Italy, with his Danish mother and Italian father, where he would later join Serie A club AS Roma. After spending several years there and a season with GSD Nuova Tor Tre Teste, he decided to take the plunge and travel north on his own to Cesena – after AC Cesena had shown interest in him. After spending a year alone in the small city on the Adriatic, he was joined by his brother and parents, who moved north to support him.

On 2 August 2018, Urso joined Salernitana, but was loaned to Pro Piacenza later that same month. He remained with Piacenza until the end of 2018, then returned to Salernitana, where his contract was terminated the following day.

On 13 April 2019, Urso joined Forlì. He made four appearances and scored one goal before leaving the club in July of that year.

On 12 July 2019, Urso signed for Serie C's Rimini, but was sold before making an official appearance for the club to fellow Serie C club Viterbese.

On 23 July 2022, Urso moved to Novara on a two-year contract.

On 11 July 2024, he signed a three-year deal with Reggiana.
