= Riccardo Calcagni =

Italian footballer

Personal information
- Date of birth: 27 June 1994 (age 32)
- Place of birth: Perugia, Italy
- Height: 1.80 m (5 ft 11 in)
- Position: Midfielder

Team information
- Current team: Monopoli
- Number: 19

Senior career*
| Years | Team | Apps | (Gls) |
| 2012–2013 | San Sisto | | |
| 2013 | Deruta | 12 | (2) |
| 2013–2016 | Lucchese | 77 | (2) |
| 2016–2020 | Pontedera | 113 | (8) |
| 2020 | Arzignano | 7 | (0) |
| 2020–2021 | Matelica | 34 | (2) |
| 2021–2022 | Viterbese | 33 | (2) |
| 2022–2025 | Novara | 91 | (5) |
| 2025– | Monopoli | 30 | (0) |
- * Club domestic league appearances and goals as of 1 May 2026

Riccardo Calcagni (born 27 June 1994) is an Italian professional footballer who plays as a midfielder for Serie C Group C club Monopoli.

== Club career ==
Calcagni started his senior career for Eccellenza club San Sisto.

On 23 September 2020, he joined Matelica.

The next season, on 7 July 2021, he signed with Viterbese.

On 15 July 2022, Calcagni moved to Novara on a two-year deal.
