= 1969–70 Serie C =

Italian football league season

The 1969–70 Serie C was the thirty-second edition of Serie C, the third highest league in the Italian football league system.

== Girone A ==
Serie C Gir. A 1969-70 team distribution
Serie C Gir. A 1969-70 team distribution in Lombardy
Serie C Gir. B 1969-70 team distribution
Serie C Gir. B 1969-70 team distribution in Tuscany
Serie C Gir. C 1969-70 team distribution
Serie C Gir. C 1969-70 team distribution in Campania

Pos	Team	Pld	W	D	L	GF	GA	GD	Pts	Promotion or relegation
1	Novara	38	23	11	4	51	22	+29	57	Promoted to Serie B
2	Lecco	38	20	13	5	44	24	+20	53	
3	Treviso	38	17	17	4	47	24	+23	51	
4	Triestina	38	16	13	9	33	22	+11	45	
5	Legnano	38	15	12	11	32	22	+10	42	
6	Solbiatese	38	10	20	8	37	32	+5	40	
7	Udinese	38	9	21	8	30	32	−2	39	
8	Padova	38	12	15	11	27	30	−3	39	
9	Alessandria	38	13	11	14	39	34	+5	37	
10	Rovereto	38	12	13	13	30	28	+2	37	
11	Venezia	38	9	19	10	24	30	−6	37	
12	Sottomarina	38	11	13	14	28	33	−5	35	
13	Seregno	38	11	12	15	33	38	−5	34	
14	Pro Patria	38	10	14	14	27	34	−7	34	
15	Derthona	38	9	15	14	25	31	−6	33	
16	Verbania	38	11	11	16	31	41	−10	33	
17	Monfalcone	38	7	18	13	27	36	−9	32	
18	Marzotto	38	8	16	14	24	36	−12	32 (Note: Relegated for goal difference.)	Relegated to Serie D
19	Trevigliese	38	4	20	14	23	45	−22	28	Relegated to Serie D
20	Biellese	38	7	8	23	29	47	−18	22	Relegated to Serie D

== Girone B ==
Pos	Team	Pld	W	D	L	GF	GA	GD	Pts	Promotion or relegation
1	Massese	38	20	12	6	55	32	+23	52	Promoted to Serie B
2	S.P.A.L.	38	17	16	5	40	18	+22	50	
3	Sambenedettese	38	19	11	8	40	12	+28	49	
4	Del Duca Ascoli	38	19	10	9	43	24	+19	48	
5	Empoli	38	11	19	8	33	27	+6	41	
6	Prato	38	12	15	11	34	29	+5	39	
7	Lucchese	38	12	14	12	35	29	+6	38	
8	Ravenna	38	13	12	13	33	27	+6	38	
9	Imola	38	10	18	10	30	35	−5	38	
10	Savona	38	10	17	11	38	33	+5	37	
11	Spezia	38	12	13	13	22	26	−4	37	
12	Anconitana	38	9	17	12	40	45	−5	35	
13	Viareggio	38	8	19	11	30	38	−8	35	
14	Rimini	38	9	17	12	24	34	−10	35	
15	Entella	38	12	10	16	29	34	−5	34	
16	Torres	38	11	12	15	26	35	−9	34	
17	Olbia	38	9	15	14	28	45	−17	33	
18	Siena	38	10	12	16	20	40	−20	32	Relegated to Serie D
19	Pistoiese	38	9	11	18	24	40	−16	29	Relegated to Serie D
20	Vis Pesaro	38	8	10	20	28	49	−21	26	Relegated to Serie D

== Girone C ==
Pos	Team	Pld	W	D	L	GF	GA	GD	Pts	Promotion or relegation
1	Casertana	38	19	14	5	51	24	+27	52	Promoted to Serie B
2	Brindisi	38	19	12	7	40	17	+23	50	
3	Internapoli	38	14	17	7	37	23	+14	45	
4	Sorrento	38	11	21	6	29	17	+12	43	
5	Lecce	38	16	10	12	32	23	+9	42	
6	Matera	38	11	18	9	29	21	+8	40	
7	Messina	38	12	15	11	23	21	+2	39	
8	Crotone	38	11	16	11	25	25	0	38	
9	Pescara	38	10	17	11	26	24	+2	37	
10	Chieti	38	11	15	12	28	29	−1	37	
11	Salernitana	38	11	15	12	20	28	−8	37	
12	Acquapozzillo	38	12	12	14	26	36	−10	36	
13	Potenza	38	8	19	11	38	36	+2	35	
14	Avellino	38	10	15	13	24	23	+1	35	
15	Cosenza	38	8	19	11	28	33	−5	35	
16	Pro Vasto	38	9	17	12	27	38	−11	35	
17	Barletta	38	10	13	15	28	36	−8	33	
18	Massiminiana	38	8	13	17	32	62	−30	29	Relegated to Serie D
19	Latina	38	9	17	12	23	28	−5	27 (Note: 8 points deducted.)	Relegated to Serie D
20	Trapani	38	8	11	19	32	54	−22	27	Relegated to Serie D

== References and sources ==
- Almanacco Illustrato del Calcio – La Storia 1898–2004, Panini Edizioni, Modena, September 2005
