= Davide Bertoncini =

Italian footballer (born 1991)

Personal information
- Date of birth: 9 May 1991 (age 35)
- Place of birth: Fiorenzuola d'Arda, Italy
- Height: 1.88 m (6 ft 2 in)
- Position: Defender

Youth career
- –2011: Piacenza
- 2009–2010: → Genoa (loan)
- 2010–2011: Genoa

Senior career*
Years	Team	Apps	(Gls)
2011–2012	Piacenza	16	(1)
2012–2013	Genoa	0	(0)
2012–2013	→ Frosinone (loan)	13	(0)
2013–2017	Frosinone	39	(1)
2016	→ Modena (loan)	8	(0)
2017	Matera	7	(0)
2017–2019	Piacenza	42	(4)
2018	→ Lucchese (loan)	16	(0)
2019–2020	Reggina	15	(0)
2020–2022	Como	32	(0)
2022–2026	Novara	74	(4)
- * Club domestic league appearances and goals as of 30 April 2026

Davide Bertoncini (born 9 May 1991) is an Italian footballer.

== Biography ==
Born in Fiorenzuola d'Arda, Province of Piacenza, Emilia region, Bertoncini started his career at Piacenza. On 31 August 2009 Bertoncini left for Serie A club Genoa on a temporary deal. In June 2010 Genoa signed the defender on a co-ownership deal for €150,000. During the 2 years, Bertoncini was a member of Genoa's reserves; Bertoncini appeared once in 2010–11 Serie A as an unused substitute in January 2011 as number 31. In summer 2011 Bertoncini returned to Piacenza for their 2011–12 Lega Pro Prima Divisione campaign, as the club had been relegated from Serie B in 2011. Bertoncini also signed a three-year professional contract with Genoa on 1 September 2009, as a three-year professional contract could only be offered to players who graduate from the reserve (under-20 team) according to N.O.I.F. of FIGC. The club was declared bankrupt in mid-season. In June 2012 Genoa acquired Bertoncini outright from Piacenza for €550. Both clubs failed to agree a price and had to submit a bid to Lega Serie A to determine the ownership, eventually Genoa's €50 more than usual peppercorn bid of €500 won.

In July 2012 Bertoncini left for another third division club Frosinone on a temporary deal with an option to purchase half of the player's registration rights. In June 2013 Frosinone excised the option. Frosinone eventually advanced to Serie A, giving Bertoncini his only experience of top-tier football so far.

On 16 July 2019, he signed a 2-year contract with Serie C club Reggina.

On 30 September 2020, he joined Como on a two-year contract.

On 1 September 2022, Bertoncini signed a two-year contract with Novara.
