= Simone Rossetti =

Italian footballer

Personal information
- Date of birth: 9 June 1997 (age 29)
- Place of birth: Castel San Pietro Terme, Italy
- Height: 1.86 m (6 ft 1 in)
- Position: Forward

Team information
- Current team: Prato

Youth career
- Bologna

Senior career*
Years	Team	Apps	(Gls)
2016–2017	Bologna	0	(0)
2016	→ Castiadas (loan)	12	(1)
2016–2017	→ Mezzolara (loan)	32	(12)
2017–2018	Francavilla	8	(0)
2018–2019	Imolese	31	(4)
2019–2020	Modena	21	(5)
2020–2021	Matelica	8	(0)
2021	Novara	19	(6)
2021–2023	Renate	34	(7)
2023	→ Taranto (loan)	11	(0)
2023–2024	Novara	13	(2)
2024–2025	Livorno	39	(14)
2025–	Prato	0	(0)
- * Club domestic league appearances and goals as of 17 September 2025

Simone Rossetti (born 9 June 1997) is an Italian professional footballer who plays as a forward for Serie D club Prato.

== Club career ==
Born in Castel San Pietro Terme, Rossetti was formed in Bologna youth system. He made his senior debut for Serie D club Castiadas on 2016–17 season. The forward left Bologna in 2017, and signed for Serie C club Imolese. He also played for Modena, Matelica and Novara, all Serie C clubs.

On 11 August 2021, he joined Serie C club Renate.

On 4 January 2023, Rossetti was loaned to Taranto.

On 12 July 2023, Rossetti returned to Novara on a two-year deal.
