= Axel Desjardins =

Canadian soccer player (born 2000)

Personal information
- Date of birth: January 13, 2000 (age 26)
- Place of birth: Montreal, Quebec, Canada
- Height: 1.88 m (6 ft 2 in)
- Position: Goalkeeper

Team information
- Current team: Tuttocuoio
- Number: 1

Youth career
- 2010–2014: GISSPRO Montreal
- 2014–2019: Spezia

Senior career*
Years	Team	Apps	(Gls)
2020–2021	Spezia	1	(0)
2020–2021	→ Novara (loan)	4	(0)
2021–2025	Novara	55	(0)
2025	Taranto		
2025–2026	Tuttocuoio	18	(0)
2026–	ASD Oltrepò FBC	0	(0)
- * Club domestic league appearances and goals as of August 21, 2026

Axel Desjardins (born January 13, 2000) is a Canadian professional soccer player who plays as a goalkeeper for Italian Serie D club Tuttocuoio.

== Early career ==
At 11, he started playing with the Braves d'Ahuntsic. When he was 13, his goaltending coach let him know about an academy in Italy run by Montrealer Jos Recine (Contact Sports Management) that gave opportunities to players from Australia, the United States and Canada. He went to Genoa, to participate in an exhibition match with the academies of Juventus, Genoa, Inter Milan and Spezia, and attracted the attention of the Spezia coaches, who invited him to trial with the team, after which he was offered a spot in their academy.

== Club career ==
Desjardins is a youth academy graduate of Spezia. He made his professional debut for the club on July 31, 2020 in a Serie B match against Salernitana. He replaced Titas Krapikas in the stoppage minute of second half as his team won the match 2–1.

On October 6, 2020, Serie C club Novara signed Desjardins on a season long loan deal. On November 25, 2021, he would re-join Novara on a permanent deal, after they had been relegated to Serie D.

== International career ==
In October 2018, Canada under-20 team head coach Andrew Olivieri called up Desjardins to attend a training camp ahead of 2018 CONCACAF U-20 Championship.

== Career statistics ==
=== Club ===
As of January 21, 2024

Club	League	Season	League		Cup		Playoffs		Total	
Club	League	Season	Apps	Goals	Apps	Goals	Apps	Goals	Apps	Goals
Spezia	Serie B	2019–20	1	0	0	0	0	0	1	0
Novara (loan)	Serie C	2020–21	4	0	0	0	0	0	4	0
Novara	Serie D	2021–22	19	0	0	0	3	0	22	0
Novara	Serie C	2022–23	17	0	1	0	1	0	19	0
Novara	Serie C	2023–24	19	0	1	0	0	0	20	0
Novara	Serie C	2024–25	0	0	0	0	0	0	0	0
Novara	Total		59	0	2	0	4	0	65	0
Career total			60	0	2	0	4	0	66	0
