= Alexander Murillo =

Spanish footballer (born 2006)

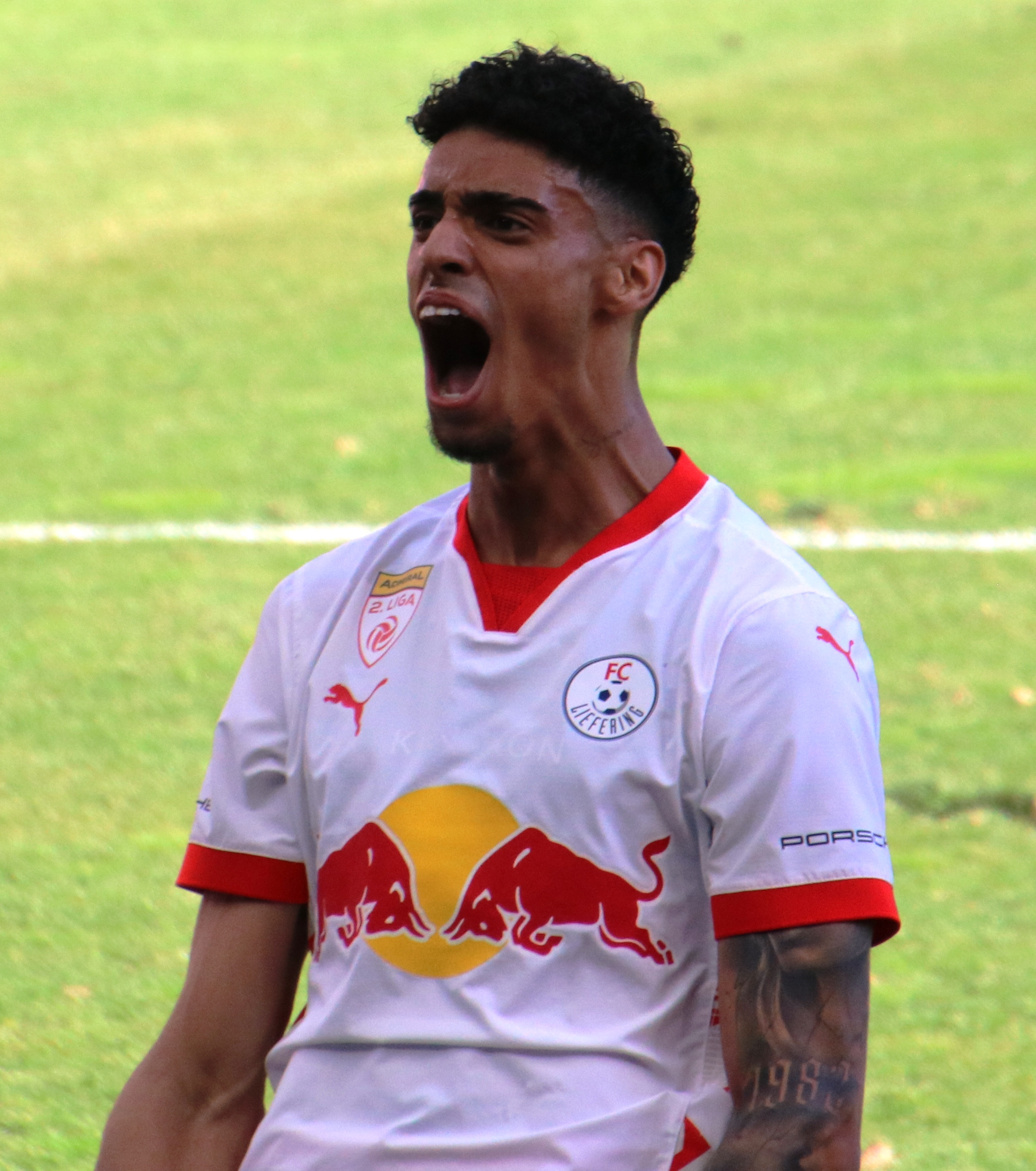
- Murillo in 2025

Personal information
- Full name: Alexander Murillo Albert
- Date of birth: 4 October 2006 (age 20)
- Place of birth: Alicante, Spain
- Height: 1.94 m (6 ft 4 in)
- Position: Forward

Team information
- Current team: Lecco (on loan from FC Liefering)
- Number: 15

Youth career
- Brave Elche
- –2022: Kelme
- 2023: Red Bull Salzburg

Senior career*
Years	Team	Apps	(Gls)
2023–	FC Liefering	32	(3)
2026–	→ Lecco (loan)	1	(0)

International career
2022	Spain U16	2	(0)
- * Club domestic league appearances and goals as of 31 August 2026

Alexander Murillo Albert (born 4 October 2006) is a Spanish professional footballer who plays as a forward for Serie C Group A club Lecco, on loan from 2. Liga club FC Liefering.

== Early and personal life ==
Murillo was born in Alicante, Spain, to Colombian parents. Murillo is the nephew of former Once Caldas player Jairo Murillo.

== Club career ==
Murillo began his career with amateur side Brave Elche, where he played at under-12 level. He later joined the academy of Kelme, where he established himself as a prolific goal-scorer, with nineteen goals in thirty-one appearances at youth level.

Having left Kelme in the summer of 2022, Murillo signed with Austrian side Red Bull Salzburg as a free agent, signing a two-and-a-half-year deal and joining the club in January 2023. He was initially assigned to the club's under-18 side.

Murillo joined Italian Serie C side Lecco, on loan for the 2026–27 season.

== International career ==
Murillo was called up to the Spanish under-16 side in February 2022, going on to feature in two friendlies against Switzerland. He remains eligible to represent Colombia.
