= Mario Zanello =

Italian footballer and manager

Personal information
- Full name: Mario Zanello
- Date of birth: 22 July 1903
- Place of birth: Vercelli, Kingdom of Italy
- Date of death: 25 January 1981 (aged 77)
- Place of death: Carmagnola, Italy
- Position: Defender

Senior career*
Years	Team	Apps	(Gls)
1922–1933	Pro Vercelli	276	(49)
1933–1936	Torino	67	(0)
1936–1937	Chieri	?	(?)
1937–1940	Vigevano	79	(5)

International career
1927	Italy	2	(0)

Managerial career
- 1939: Vigevano
- 1940–1943: Cuneo
Medal record
Men's Football
Representing Italy
Central European International Cup
Gold medal – first place	1927-30 Central European International Cup
- * Club domestic league appearances and goals

Mario Zanello (Italian pronunciation: [ˈmaːrjo ddzaˈnɛllo]; 22 July 1903 – 25 January 1981) was an Italian association football manager and footballer who played as a defender. He represented the Italy national football team twice, the first being on 23 October 1927, the occasion of a 1927–30 Central European International Cup match against Czechoslovakia in a 2–2 away draw.

== Honours ==
=== Players ===
Torino

- Coppa Italia: 1935–36

Italy

- Central European International Cup: 1927–30
