= Giustiniano Marucco =

Italian footballer

Personal information
- Date of birth: 22 August 1899
- Place of birth: Maggiora, Italy
- Date of death: 24 October 1942 (aged 43)
- Place of death: Aielli, Italy
- Position: Forward

Senior career*
| Years | Team | Apps | (Gls) |
| 1920–1926 | Novara | 58 | (16) |
| 1927–1928 | Juventus | 19 | (1) |
| 1928–1929 | Novara | 28 | (6) |

International career
| 1920 | Italy | 2 | (0) |
- * Club domestic league appearances and goals

Giustiniano Marucco (Italian pronunciation: [dʒustiˈnjaːno maˈrukko]; 22 August 1899 – 24 October 1942) was an Italian footballer who played as a forward. He competed for Italy in the men's football tournament at the 1920 Summer Olympics.
