= 1964–65 Serie C =

The 1964–65 Serie C was the twenty-seventh edition of Serie C, the third highest league in the Italian football league system.

== Girone A ==
Pos	Team	Pld	W	D	L	GF	GA	GD	Pts	Promotion or relegation
1	Novara	34	15	17	2	49	25	+24	47	Promoted to Serie B
2	Biellese	34	13	15	6	48	29	+19	41	
3	Solbiatese	34	14	12	8	50	32	+18	40	
4	Savona	34	14	12	8	41	30	+11	40	
5	Como	34	13	12	9	47	32	+15	38	
6	Piacenza	34	9	18	7	28	25	+3	36	
7	Marzotto	34	10	16	8	29	31	−2	36	
8	Treviso	34	13	9	12	34	38	−4	35	
9	Entella	34	11	12	11	31	30	+1	34	
10	Carpi	34	7	19	8	27	28	−1	33	
11	Udinese	34	10	12	12	21	29	−8	32	
12	Cremonese	34	10	10	14	31	36	−5	30	
13	Mestrina	34	12	6	16	29	38	−9	30	
14	Legnano	34	7	16	11	19	29	−10	30	
15	Monfalcone C.R.D.A.	34	7	15	12	30	43	−13	29	
15	Ivrea	34	8	13	13	31	46	−15	29	
17	Vittorio Veneto	34	5	16	13	26	37	−11	26	Relegated to Serie D
18	Fanfulla	34	6	14	14	24	37	−13	26	Relegated to Serie D

== Girone B ==
Pos	Team	Pld	W	D	L	GF	GA	GD	Pts	Promotion or relegation
1	Pisa	34	18	11	5	46	18	+28	47	Promoted to Serie B
2	Arezzo	34	15	16	3	46	24	+22	46	
3	Ternana	34	19	7	8	36	20	+16	45	
4	Perugia	34	13	13	8	37	26	+11	39	
5	Siena	34	10	17	7	34	28	+6	37	
6	Carrarese	34	10	16	8	21	17	+4	36	
7	Ravenna	34	10	15	9	27	31	−4	35	
8	Prato	34	10	14	10	21	18	+3	34	
9	Empoli	34	12	9	13	35	32	+3	33	
10	Torres	34	10	13	11	31	28	+3	33	
11	Cesena	34	8	17	9	20	18	+2	33	
12	Ancona	34	7	19	8	23	34	−11	33	
13	Lucchese	34	8	15	11	31	39	−8	31	
14	Rimini	34	8	14	12	21	26	−5	30	
15	Pistoiese	34	8	13	13	26	31	−5	29	
16	Maceratese	34	6	14	14	15	35	−20	26	
17	Grosseto	34	7	9	18	31	55	−24	23	Relegated to Serie D
18	Forlì	34	5	12	17	23	44	−21	22	Relegated to Serie D

== Girone C ==
Pos	Team	Pld	W	D	L	GF	GA	GD	Pts	Promotion or relegation
1	Reggina	34	16	11	7	32	17	+15	43	Promoted to Serie B
2	Taranto	34	13	16	5	25	14	+11	42	
3	Casertana	34	12	17	5	31	21	+10	41	
4	Cosenza	34	14	9	11	33	31	+2	37	
5	Del Duca Ascoli	34	13	11	10	26	25	+1	37	
6	Trapani	34	11	14	9	29	23	+6	36	
7	Avellino	34	12	12	10	33	29	+4	36	
8	Sambenedettese	34	11	12	11	39	26	+13	34	
9	L'Aquila	34	13	7	14	29	31	−2	33	
10	Chieti	34	11	10	13	29	31	−2	32	
11	Pescara	34	11	10	13	27	32	−5	32	
12	Lecce	34	10	12	12	25	33	−8	32	
13	Salernitana	34	8	15	11	25	27	−2	31	
14	Siracusa	34	8	15	11	32	35	−3	31	
15	Akragas	34	11	9	14	23	27	−4	31	
16	Crotone	34	10	11	13	26	32	−6	31	
17	Marsala	34	10	10	14	22	34	−12	30	Relegated to Serie D
18	Tevere Roma	34	7	9	18	28	46	−18	23	Relegated to Serie D

== References and sources ==
- Almanacco Illustrato del Calcio – La Storia 1898–2004, Panini Edizioni, Modena, September 2005
