= Bruno Nobili =

Italian-Venezuelan footballer and coach (born 1949)

Personal information
- Full name: Bruno Nobili Bertazzi
- Date of birth: 7 October 1949 (age 77)
- Place of birth: Valencia, Venezuela
- Height: 1.77 m (5 ft 10 in)
- Position: Midfielder

Senior career*
Years	Team	Apps	(Gls)
1968–1970	Roma	1	(0)
1969–1970	→ Del Duca Ascoli (loan)	25	(1)
1970	Sampdoria	0	(0)
1970–1972	Maceratese	71	(19)
1972–1973	Avellino	37	(12)
1973–1974	Cagliari	13	(1)
1974–1982	Pescara	248	(38)
1982–1985	Francavilla	97	(21)

Managerial career
- 1993–1994: L'Aquila
- 1995–1996: L'Aquila
- 1996: Fermana
- 1997–1998: Maceratese
- 1999–2000: Fiorenzuola
- * Club domestic league appearances and goals

Bruno Nobili (born 7 October 1949) is an Italian-Venezuelan professional football coach and a former player, who played as a midfielder.

== Career ==
Nobili began playing professional football with Roma, where he made his Serie A debut against Varese on 27 April 1969. Nobili spent a season in Serie A with Cagliari but is best known for his career with Maceratese and with Pescara which included two promotions to Serie A. He was a central figure in the team's midfield during this period.

Overall, he played 4 seasons (64 games, 11 goals) in the Serie A for A.S. Roma, Cagliari Calcio and Delfino Pescara 1936.

== Personal life ==
Bruno's father was Renato Nobili, and his mother was Silvana Bertazzi. He has 4 brothers (Tullio, Cesare, Marco, Fausto) and 1 sister (Mara). He has two sons (Simone and Danielle) and a daughter (Chiara) and is married to Anna.
