= Calcio Lecco 1912 =

Italian football club

Lecco
- Full name: Calcio Lecco 1912 S.p.A.
- Nicknames: I Blucelesti (The Navy and Sky Blues)
- Founded: 1912; 114 years ago 2002; 24 years ago 2016; 10 years ago
- Ground: Stadio Rigamonti-Ceppi
- Capacity: 5,508
- Owner: Aniello Aliberti
- Chairman: Aniello Aliberti
- Manager: Federico Valente
- League: Serie C Group A
- 2025–26: Serie C Group A, 4th of 20
- Website: www.calciolecco1912.com
Home colours	Away colours	Third colours

Calcio Lecco, or simply Lecco, is a football club based in Lecco, Lombardy, Italy. Founded in 1912, the club plays in Serie C Group A.

Lecco has played in three Serie A tournaments (the last of which in the 1966–67 season) and twelve in Serie B. The club won one Coppa Italia Semiprofessionisti domestically, and one Anglo-Italian Cup internationally.

== History ==
=== Early history (1912–1931) ===
On 22 December 1912, on the idea of board member Vico Signorelli, Società Canottieri Lecco (founded on 27 September 1895 at the Caffè del Teatro Sociale) set up its own football section. The club colours were blue and light blue, taken from the historic Canottieri uniform. The first headquarters was set up in Francesco Nullo street.

On 13 April 1913, the Blucelesti (noted in some documents as "Canottieri Lecco Football Club") played their first match in a 4–1 defeat to Milan. They then participated in local friendlies and tournaments, coached by Achille Todeschini. Canottieri Lecco's debut in a FIGC-sanctioned tournament took place in the 1920–21 Promozione season: they played their first game on 5 December 1920, beating Olona 6–2 away from home. Canottieri were close to promotion to Serie A; however, after a 0–0 draw against Como-based Esperia meant that Lecco remained in Promozione.

A year later, in 1922, Eugenio Ceppi was elected president of Canottieri, who put his own land to build a new sports field (which eventually became the Stadio Rigamonti-Ceppi). The inauguration was celebrated on 15 October. In the following decade, the Blucelesti had fluctuating performances. In 1926, after finishing runners-up in the league, they were admitted to the Prima Divisione via repechange, remaining there for three years.

On 22 July 1931, after forming a provisional commission made up of the lawyer Vittorio Rigoli, the accountant Achille Gilardenghi, the engineer Nino Todeschini and the surveyor Giovanni Lanfritto, Canottieri (at the same time as the death of Eugenio Ceppi) decided to abandon the football sector due to the high economic efforts required (ITL 50,000). To avoid the dissolution of the team, a group of members formed Associazione Calcio Lecco, with Professor Gennaro Pensa as the first president and Mario Ceppi (son of the late Eugenio) as a leading member of the board. The first decision of the independent club was a drastic cost cut: the technical director Achille Todeschini (former player) liquidated almost all players not based in Lecco, replacing them with local players.

=== Di Nunno presidency (2017–present) ===
On 9 June 2017, Paolo Di Nunno purchased the club at auction, which became Calcio Lecco 1912. During the 2022–23 Serie C season, Lecco finished in third place and qualified to the national round of the promotion play-offs. After defeating Ancona, Pordenone and Cesena, Lecco qualified to the final against Foggia, who they beat 5–2 on aggregate thanks to three goals by Franco Lepore. They were thus promoted to the Serie B for the first time in 50 years.

== Players ==
=== Current squad ===
As of 1 September 2026

Note: Flags indicate national team as defined under FIFA eligibility rules; some limited exceptions apply. Players may hold more than one non-FIFA nationality.

No.	Pos.	Nation	Player
1	GK	ARG	Joaquin Dalmasso
3	DF	ITA	Lukas Sinn
4	DF	ITA	Pietro Comi (on loan from Atalanta)
5	DF	ITA	Matteo Arena
6	MF	ITA	Andrea Mallamo
8	MF	ITA	Stefano Bonaiti
9	FW	ITA	Matteo Casarotto (on loan from Virtus Entella)
10	FW	ITA	Alessandro Capello (on loan from Arezzo)
12	GK	TUN	Thomas Zouaghi
13	DF	ITA	Tommaso Bordoni (on loan from Padova)
15	FW	ESP	Alexander Murillo (on loan from Liefering)
17	MF	CAN	Gabriel Pellegrino
19	DF	ITA	Marco Litti (on loan from Roma)
20	FW	ITA	Lorenzo Mihali

No.	Pos.	Nation	Player
21	MF	ITA	Antonio Metlika
22	GK	ITA	Thomas Vettorel
24	DF	ITA	Silvan Sidler
27	DF	ITA	Daniele Triacca (on loan from Cremonese)
30	FW	ITA	Nicola Fasan
33	MF	DEN	Oliver Urso
45	DF	SUI	Mattia Rizzo
55	MF	ITA	Enrico Di Gesù
73	MF	ITA	Enrico Nova
77	MF	ITA	Davide Grassini
78	MF	ITA	Jason Anastasini
79	FW	ITA	Amney Moutassime
99	DF	ITA	Giulio Manetti (on loan from Cesena)

=== Out on loan ===
Note: Flags indicate national team as defined under FIFA eligibility rules; some limited exceptions apply. Players may hold more than one non-FIFA nationality.

No.	Pos.	Nation	Player
—	DF	ITA	Marwane Kritta (at Virtus Entella until 30 June 2027)
—	MF	ITA	Federico Arena (at Club Milano until 30 June 2027)
—	MF	ITA	Riccardo Maria Meleddu (at Casatese Merate until 30 June 2027)
—	MF	ITA	Daniele Papotti (at Brusaporto until 30 June 2027)

No.	Pos.	Nation	Player
—	MF	ITA	Nicolò Tondi (at Genoa U20 until 30 June 2027)
—	FW	ITA	Giuseppe Battimelli (at Club Milano until 30 June 2027)
—	FW	ITA	Sean Parker (at Sorrento until 30 June 2027)

== Honours ==
=== League ===
- Serie C (Level 3)
  - Winners (1): 1971–72 (group A)
- Serie D (Level 4)
  - Winners (2): 1949–50, 2018–19 (group A)
- Eccellenza (Level 5)
  - Winners (1): 2002–03 (group B)

=== Cups ===
- Coppa Italia Semiprofessionisti
  - Winners (1): 1976–77
- Anglo-Italian Cup
  - Winners (1): 1977

== Affiliated clubs ==
- (England) Bath City
