= Alessandro Savelli =

Italian footballer (1905–1930)

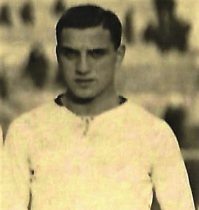

Personal information
- Full name: Alessandro Savelli
- Date of birth: 28 May 1905
- Place of birth: Crema, Italy
- Date of death: 21 November 1930 (aged 25)
- Place of death: Naples, Italy
- Position: Winger

Senior career*
Years	Team	Apps	(Gls)
1922–1923	Parma		
1923–1927	Milan	78	(35)
1927–1928	Internazionale	16	(6)
1928–1930	Cremonese		
- * Club domestic league appearances and goals

Alessandro Savelli (28 May 1905 – 21 November 1930) was an Italian professional footballer who played as a midfielder.
