= Davide Dell'Erba =

German footballer (born 2004)

Personal information
- Date of birth: 6 April 2004 (age 22)
- Place of birth: Kempten, Germany
- Height: 1.75 m (5 ft 9 in)
- Positions: Midfielder; left-back; wing-back

Team information
- Current team: Novara
- Number: 8

Youth career
- –2023: FC Augsburg

Senior career*
Years	Team	Apps	(Gls)
2022–2023	FC Augsburg II	24	(1)
2023–2025	Bayern Munich II	50	(4)
2025–	Novara	23	(0)

International career^{‡}
2019	Germany U15	1	(0)
2019–2020	Germany U16	6	(2)
2020	Germany U17	1	(0)
2021	Germany U18	3	(1)
- * Club domestic league appearances and goals as of 30 April 2026 ‡ National team caps and goals as of 22:45, 17 December 2021 (UTC)

Davide Dell'Erba (born 6 April 2004) is a German professional footballer who plays as a midfielder, left-back and wing-back for Serie C Group A club Novara.

== Early life ==
Dell'Erba started playing football at the age of three. He joined the youth academy of German side FC Augsburg at the age of twelve.

== Club career ==
He started his professional career with German side FC Augsburg II. On 29 March 2022, Dell'Erba debuted for the club during a 0–4 loss to SpVgg Bayreuth. On 5 May 2023, he scored his first goal for the club during a 4–0 win over FC Pipinsried. On 2023, he signed with German Regionalliga Bayern side Bayern Munich II.

On 24 July 2025, Dell'Erba joined Novara in the Italian third-tier Serie C on a three-year contract.

== International career ==
Dell'Erba has represented Germany internationally at youth level. He debuted for the Germany national U15 team in 2019. He is also eligible to represent Italy internationally.

== Style of play ==
He mainly operates as a midfielder. Dell'Erba is left-footed and known for his ability to create space and support build-up play, he has also been deployed as a left-back and wing-back.

== Career statistics ==
=== Club ===
As of match played 11 February 2026

Appearances and goals by club, season and competition
Club	Season	League			National cup		Other		Total	
Club	Season	Division	Apps	Goals	Apps	Goals	Apps	Goals	Apps	Goals
FC Augsburg II	2021–22	Regionalliga Bayern	3	0	—		—		3	0
FC Augsburg II	2022–23	Regionalliga Bayern	21	1	—		—		21	1
FC Augsburg II	Total		24	1	—		—		24	1
Bayern Munich II	2023–24	Regionalliga Bayern	25	1	—		—		25	1
Bayern Munich II	2024–25	Regionalliga Bayern	25	3	—		—		25	3
Bayern Munich II	Total		50	4	—		—		50	4
Novara	2025–26	Serie C	16	0	0	0	—		16	0
Novara	Total		16	0	0	0	—		16	0
Career total			90	5	0	0	0	0	90	5

== Personal life ==
Dell'Erba holds both German and Italian passports.
