= Francesco Mattuteia =

Italian footballer and manager

Personal information
- Full name: Francesco Mattuteia
- Date of birth: 25 January 1897
- Place of birth: Santhià, Italy
- Date of death: 7 March 1981 (aged 84)
- Place of death: Aosta, Italy
- Position: Forward

Senior career*
Years	Team	Apps	(Gls)
1915–1916	US Vercellese	4	(3)
1919–1920	Pro Vercelli	15	(2)
1920–1923	Novara	56	(22)
1923–1927	Pro Vercelli	69	(20)
1927–1929	Piacenza	35	(25)
1929–1931	Siena	31	(20)

International career
1924	Italy	1	(0)

Managerial career
- 1927–1929: Piacenza
- 1929–1931: Siena
- 1931–1932: SPAL
- 1932: Teramo
- 1933–1939: Aosta
- * Club domestic league appearances and goals

Francesco Mattuteia (Italian pronunciation: [franˈtʃesko mattuˈtɛːja]; 25 January 1897 – 7 March 1981) was an Italian association football manager and footballer who played as a forward. On 23 November 1924, he represented the Italy national football team on the occasion of a friendly match against Germany in a 1–0 away win.
