= Francesco Borello =

Italian footballer

Personal information
- Date of birth: 16 January 1902
- Place of birth: Vercelli, Kingdom of Italy
- Date of death: 9 May 1979 (aged 77)
- Position: Striker

Senior career*
Years	Team	Apps	(Gls)
1919–1928	Pro Vercelli	154	(30)
1928–1929	Biellese	3	(0)
1929–1930	Pro Vercelli	0	(0)

International career
1924	Italy	1	(0)
- * Club domestic league appearances and goals

Francesco Borello (Italian pronunciation: [franˈtʃesko boˈrɛllo]; 16 January 1902 – 9 May 1979) was an Italian professional footballer who played as a striker.

He played for 10 seasons for U.S. Pro Vercelli Calcio.

He played his only game for the Italy national football team on 9 March 1924 in a game against Spain.
