= Giuseppe Santagostino =

Italian footballer (1901–1955)

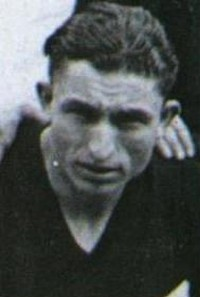

Personal information
- Full name: Giuseppe Santagostino
- Date of birth: March 18, 1901
- Place of birth: Milan, Italy
- Date of death: April 1, 1955 (aged 54)
- Place of death: Milan, Italy
- Position: Striker

Senior career*
Years	Team	Apps	(Gls)
1921–1932	AC Milan	233	(103)
1932–1933	Catanzaro		
- Nice
- Atalanta

Managerial career
- 1943–1945: AC Milan
- * Club domestic league appearances and goals

Giuseppe Santagostino (18 March 1901 – 1 April 1955) was an Italian professional footballer and manager who played as a striker.

He ranks eighth in AC Milan's all-time goalscorers list, and has been inducted into the club's Hall of Fame.

Notably, Santagostino scored the first goal ever at the San Siro.

== Career statistics ==
Club	Season	League		
Club	Season	Division	Apps	Goals
AC Milan	1921–22	Prima Divisione	10	5
AC Milan	1922–23	Prima Divisione	21	11
AC Milan	1923–24	Prima Divisione	21	16
AC Milan	1924–25	Prima Divisione	21	4
AC Milan	1925–26	Prima Divisione	17	6
AC Milan	1926–27	Divisione Nazionale	23	7
AC Milan	1927–28	Divisione Nazionale	27	8
AC Milan	1928–29	Divisione Nazionale	30	23
AC Milan	1929–30	Serie A	33	11
AC Milan	1930–31	Serie A	27	11
AC Milan	1931–32	Serie A	3	1
AC Milan	Total		233	103
Catanzaro	1932–33	Prima Divisione	?	?
Nice	1933–34	Division 1	?	?
Atalanta	?	?	?	?

== Honours ==
=== Individual ===
- AC Milan Hall of Fame
