= Stadio Silvio Piola (Novara) =

Football stadium in Novara, Italy

Coordinates: 45°26′9″N 8°35′45″E

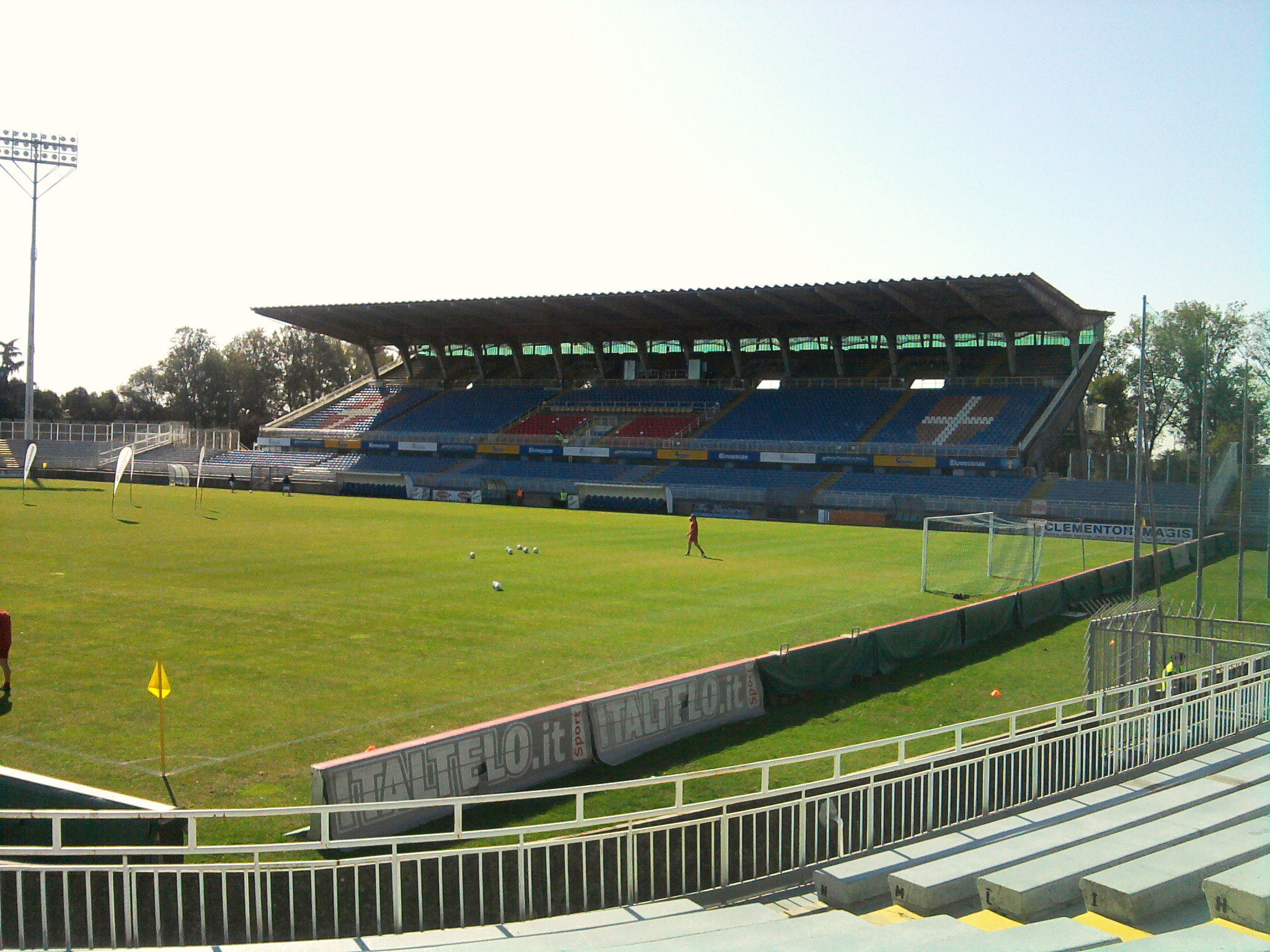
- Interactive map of Stadio Silvio Piola
- Location: Novara, Italy
- Owner: Municipality of Novara
- Capacity: 17,875
- Surface: synthetic grass Italgreen 62 Lesmo Geofill; 105x68m

Construction
- Groundbreaking: 1971
- Opened: 1976
- Renovated: 2011

Tenants
- Novara Calcio; Italy national football team (selected matches)

The Stadio Silvio Piola is a multi-use stadium in Novara, Italy. It is currently used mostly for football matches and is the home ground of Novara Calcio. The stadium holds 17,875 and was named after Italy legend and former player Silvio Piola (1913–1996).
