= Alfredo De Franceschini =

Italian footballer and football manager (1902-1959)

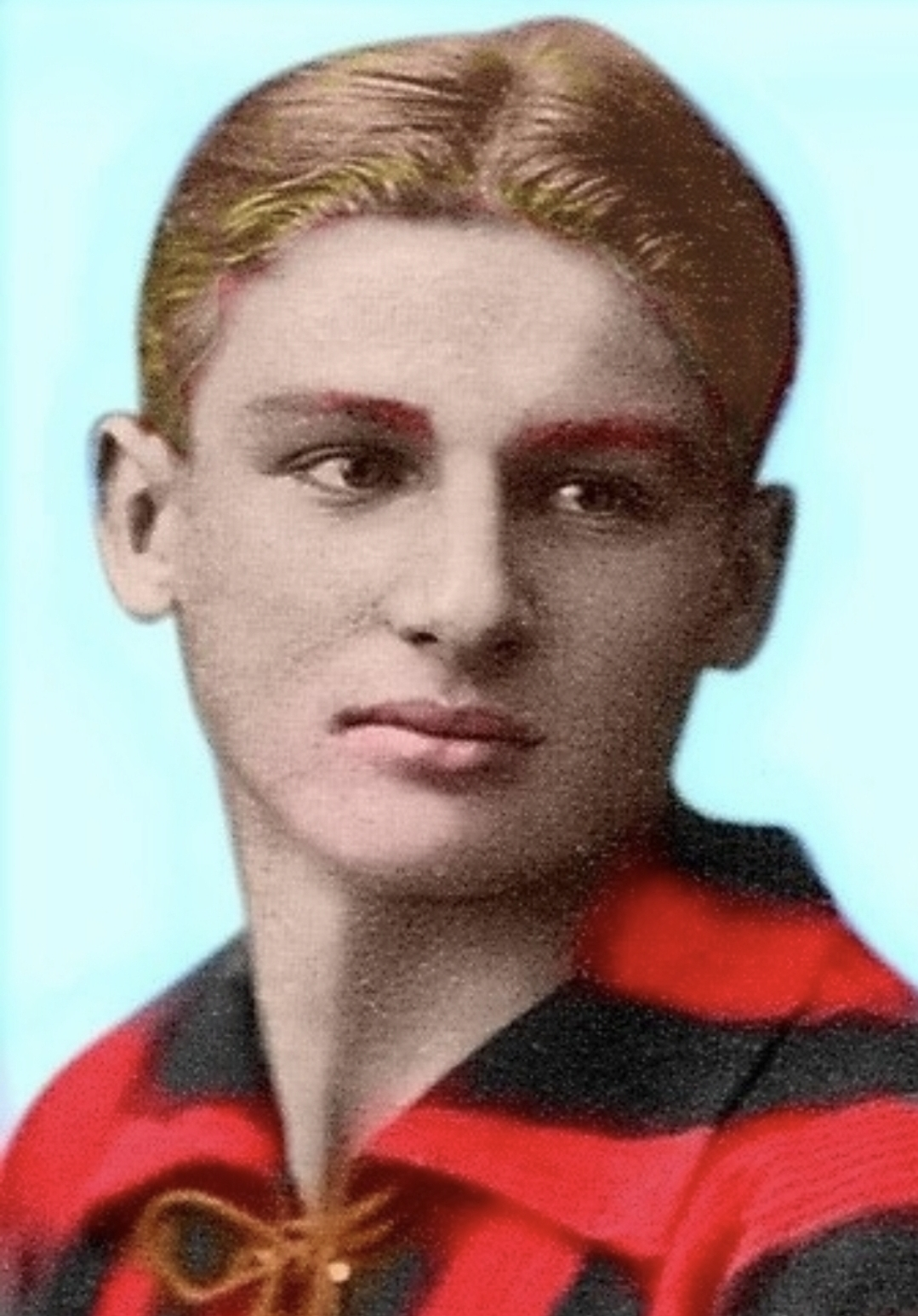

Personal information
- Full name: Alfredo De Franceschini
- Date of birth: 12 December 1902
- Place of birth: Milan, Italy
- Date of death: 11 June 1959 (aged 56)
- Position: Midfielder

Youth career
- Milan

Senior career*
Years	Team	Apps	(Gls)
1921–1929	Milan	103	(0)
- Codogno

Managerial career
- Codogno
- * Club domestic league appearances and goals

Alfredo De Franceschini (12 December 1902 – 11 June 1959) was an Italian professional footballer, who played as a midfielder, and football manager.
