= Francisco Sartore =

Brazilian footballer (born 1995)

Personal information
- Full name: Perez Francisco Sartore Dos Santos
- Date of birth: 6 July 1995 (age 31)
- Place of birth: Santos, Brazil
- Height: 1.71 m (5 ft 7 in)
- Position: Forward

Team information
- Current team: Reggina

Youth career
- 2012–2015: Genoa

Senior career*
Years	Team	Apps	(Gls)
2014–2015	→ Mantova (loan)	16	(1)
2015–2016	Lucchese	17	(1)
2016–2017	Matera	38	(4)
2018–2020	Alessandria	55	(4)
2020–2021	Bisceglie	34	(2)
2021–2022	Turris	10	(0)
2022–2023	Fiorenzuola	44	(4)
2023	Renate	10	(1)
2023–2025	Trapani	12	(1)
2024–2025	→ Piacenza (loan)	13	(0)
2025	Gela	0	(0)
2025–	Reggina	0	(0)
- * Club domestic league appearances and goals as of 7 November 2025

Perez Francisco Sartore Dos Santos, known as Francisco Santore (born 6 July 1995) is a Brazilian footballer who plays as a forward for Italian Serie D club Reggina. He also holds Italian citizenship.

== Club career ==
Sartore started his Italian career in the youth teams of Genoa, before he was loaned to Lega Pro side Mantova for the 2014–15 season. He made his professional debut on 30 August 2014 against Alessandria, playing 59 minutes as a member of starting team. He left Genoa on the summer of 2015, signing to fellow third tier Lucchese. He spent the 2016–17 and 2017–18 seasons at Matera, before he signed to Alessandria.

On 9 October 2020 he joined Bisceglie.

On 6 September 2021, he signed with Turris.

On 11 January 2022, he moved to Fiorenzuola.
