= Novara FC =

Italian football club

Novara
- Full name: Novara Football Club
- Nicknames: Gli Azzurri (The Blues/The Light Blues); I Gaudenziani (The Gaudentians)
- Founded: 1908; 118 years ago 2021; 5 years ago as Novara FC
- Stadium: Stadio Silvio Piola
- Capacity: 17,875
- Owner(s): BF S.r.l. (75%); PLM Management S.r.l. (25%)
- President: Fabio Boveri
- Head coach: Manuel Iori
- League: Serie C Group A
- 2025–26: Serie C Group A, 13th of 20
- Website: www.novarafootballclub.it
Home colours	Away colours

Novara Football Club, commonly referred to as Novara, is an Italian football club based in Novara, Piedmont.

The club was founded in 2021 by the City of Novara to replace old Novara Calcio that lost its professional status.

== History ==
In December 1908 the F.A.S. (Football Association Studenti) was created by eight students of Liceo Carlo Alberto, aged between 15 and 16 years; among them an engineer, Gianni Canestrini, and a lawyer, Piero Zorini. In Novara in those days, there were other small clubs like Voluntas, Pro Scalon, Ginnastica e Scherma, Forza & Speranza, Collegio Gallarini and many other student bodies. The best players from these teams came together to form Novara Calcio, and made their debut in the Italian league on 3 November 1912.

The first match was played against a team already then established as Torino, who won 2–1.

In the years between World War I and World War II, Novara challenged with Pro Vercelli, Alessandria and Casale to make the so-called "quadrilatero piemontese" (Piedmont Quadrilateral). Novara played a Coppa Italia final against Inter in 1939. Novara's highest finish came in 1952 when they finished in eighth place in Serie A.

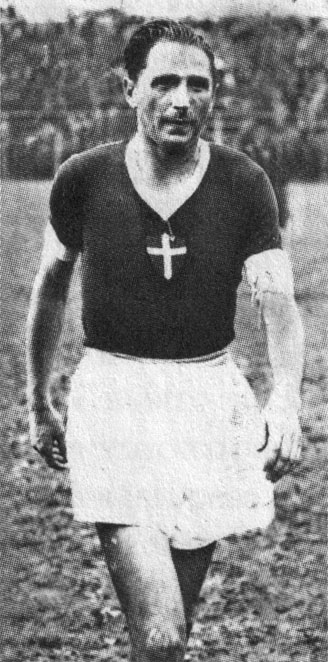
Italy's and club's legend Silvio Piola spent 7 seasons with Novara in the post–World War II era

During these years of staying in the top flight, Novara had Silvio Piola to thank. His many goals (which at the end of his career was over 300), made a huge contribution to the cause of Novara. Following his death in 1996, the stadium at which Novara play was dedicated in his name.

In 1956 came relegation to Serie B, and another five years afterwards, they slipped down to Serie C due to a fraudulent complaint by a Sambenedettese player.

A few successful seasons in Serie B followed, but then Novara stumbled again in 1977 with relegation to Serie C and worse in 1981 to Serie C2. In the 1995–96 season, Novara were back in Serie C1, but this joy was short-lived as the following year, the biancoazzurri again had to deal with relegation.

Years were spent in the shadows of Italian football until more recently when the league was won in the 2002–03 season.

=== From Serie C1 to Serie A ===
Consolidation in Serie C1 followed, later becoming Lega Pro Prima Divisione, until the historic promotion of the 2009–10 season where the club returned to Serie B after 33 years.

On 12 June 2011, Novara remarkably secured its promotion to Serie A after a 55-year absence from the league, by defeating Padova in the play-off final. Both consecutive promotions were achieved under the tenure of head coach Attilio Tesser, who was confirmed as Novara boss also for the following 2011–12 top flight campaign.

On 20 September 2011, the first home game in Serie A for 55 years, Novara recorded an historic 3–1 victory over Inter.

This remarkable feat, however, was not representative of their season as Novara managed to win only one more game until the end of January, when it won again against Inter in San Siro. The manager Attilio Tesser was replaced by veteran coach Emiliano Mondonico and re-hired one month later in a desperate and ultimately vain attempt by the owners to save the club from relegation. The club was immediately relegated again to Serie B after one season. Novara finished 5th in 2012–13 season but were eliminated by Empoli in the promotion play-offs. The following season was terrible for Novara as the club finished 19th in Serie B and lost in a play-out against Varese, losing 4–2 on aggregate. Thus, Novara were relegated to Lega Pro. Novara were crowned as champions of Group A of Lega Pro in 2014–15 and immediately returned to Serie B. In their first season back in Serie B they finished in a playoff spot but they lost to eventual winners Pescara in the semifinal. The following season saw them finish outside the playoffs in 9th, 4 points from a playoff spot. The following season saw Novara get relegated back to Lega Pro following a 20th-place finish in the 2017–18 Serie B.

During the summer of 2021, Novara lost its professional status and a phoenix club was founded in Serie D according to article 52 of FIGC's regulations NOIF. They were promoted back to Serie C in May 2022, after finishing top of their group in Serie D.

== Current squad ==
As of 1 September 2026

Note: Flags indicate national team as defined under FIFA eligibility rules; some limited exceptions apply. Players may hold more than one non-FIFA nationality.

No.	Pos.	Nation	Player
1	GK	ITA	Elia Boseggia
2	DF	ITA	Jacopo Scarpetta
3	DF	GHA	Sylvester Lartey
4	MF	ITA	Roberto Ranieri
5	DF	ITA	Filippo Lorenzini
6	MF	ITA	Marco Nichetti
7	FW	ITA	Eric Lanini
8	MF	GER	Davide Dell'Erba
9	FW	ITA	Diego Zuppel (on loan from Guidonia)
11	MF	ITA	Nicolò Ledonne
14	MF	ITA	Marco Romano (on loan from Genoa)
15	DF	MAR	Omar Khailoti
19	MF	ITA	Riccardo Collodel
20	FW	ITA	Marco Da Graca
21	MF	ITA	Alessandro Cortese

No.	Pos.	Nation	Player
22	GK	ITA	Pietro Anfossi
23	MF	ITA	Eyob Zambataro
24	DF	ITA	Iacopo Canneti
28	DF	ITA	Adrian Cannavaro
32	DF	ITA	Mattia De Nicolo
33	GK	ITA	Federico Brancolini
35	MF	ITA	Leonardo Pregnolato
36	MF	ITA	Riccardo Arboscello
42	DF	ITA	Lorenzo Moretti
58	DF	ITA	Mirko Miceli
70	DF	ITA	Andrea Valdesi
71	DF	ITA	Leonardo D'Alessio
77	FW	ITA	Christian Donadio
99	MF	ITA	Gianmarco Basso

=== Out on loan ===
Note: Flags indicate national team as defined under FIFA eligibility rules; some limited exceptions apply. Players may hold more than one non-FIFA nationality.

No.	Pos.	Nation	Player
—	DF	ITA	Alessandro Citi (at Virtus Francavilla until 30 June 2027)
—	DF	ITA	Edoardo De Mori (at Reggina until 30 June 2027)

No.	Pos.	Nation	Player
—	MF	ITA	Mattia Malaspina (at Ischia until 30 June 2027)

== Notable players ==
The following is a provisional list of players that played internationally or for European top clubs, sorted by nationality.

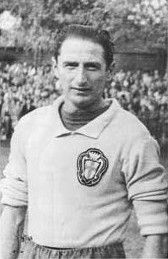
Silvio Piola

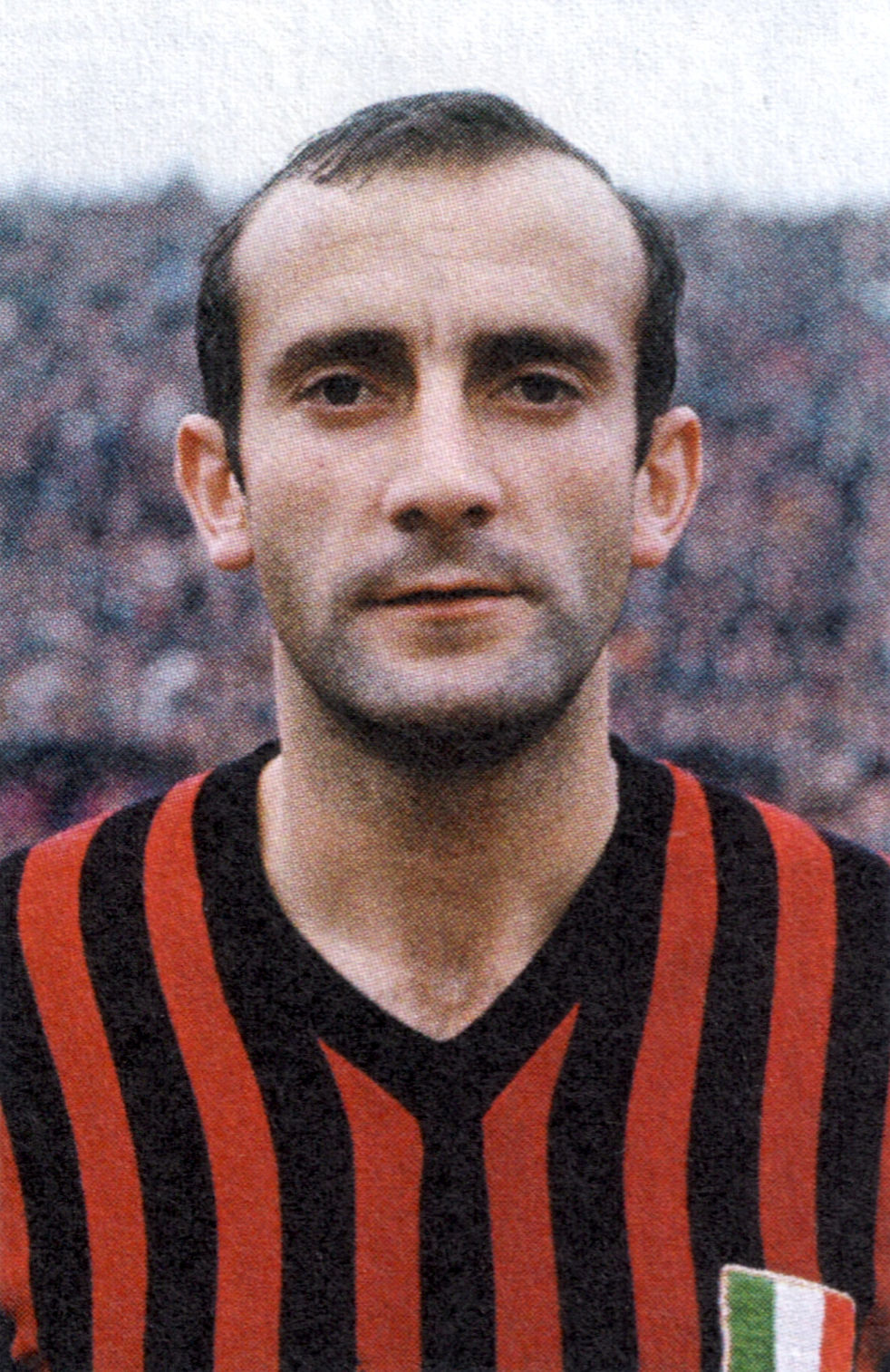
Giovanni Lodetti

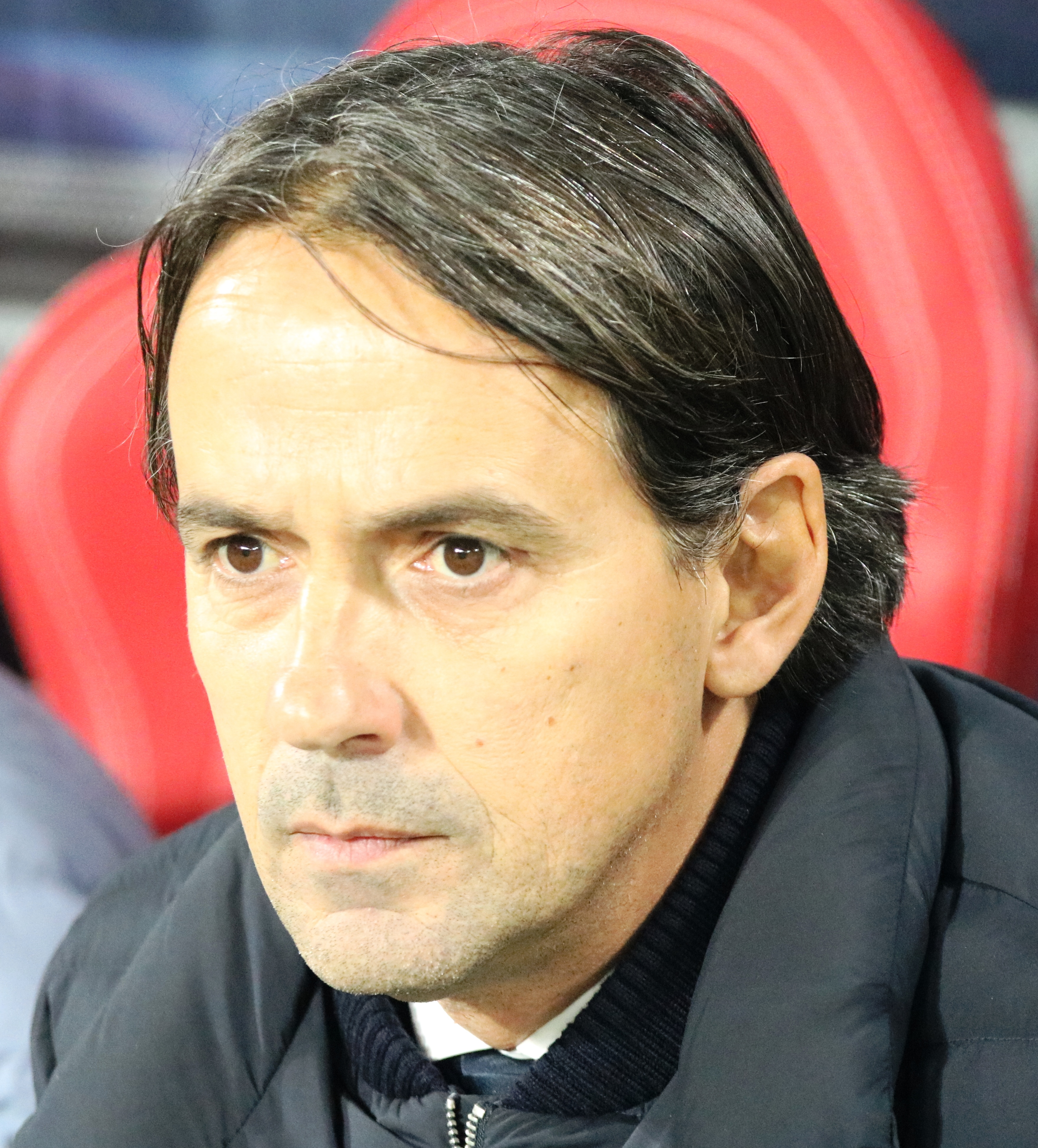
Simone Inzaghi

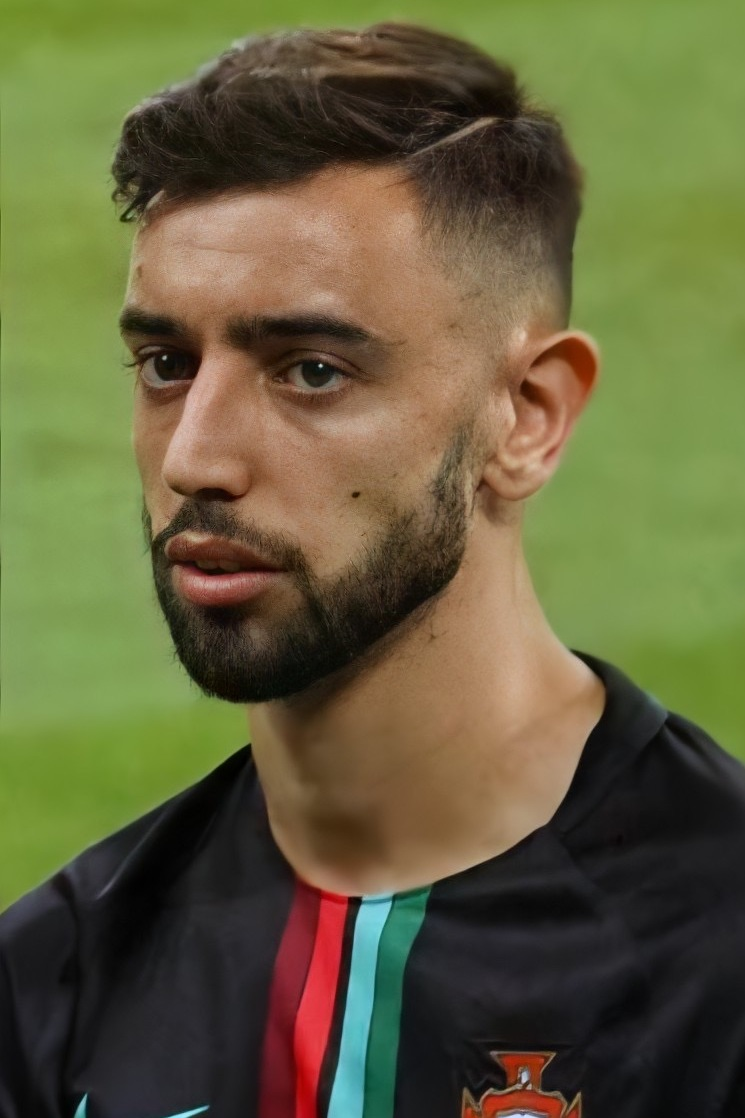
Bruno Fernandes

- (Argentina) Emanuel Gigliotti
- (Denmark) Daniel Jensen
- (Denmark) Johannes Pløger
- (Italy) Savino Bellini
- (Italy) Gino Cappello
- (Italy) Andrea Caracciolo
- (Italy) Riccardo Carapellese
- (Italy) Emidio Cavigioli
- (Italy) Giancarlo Cella
- (Italy) Luigi Cevenini
- (Italy) Antonello Cuccureddu
- (Italy) Atilio Demaría
- (Italy) Michele Di Gregorio
- (Italy) Pietro Ferraris
- (Italy) Claudio Garella
- (Italy) Giuseppe Grabbi
- (Italy) Simone Inzaghi
- (Italy) Giovanni Lodetti
- (Italy) Giustiniano Marucco
- (Italy) Giuseppe Mascara
- (Italy) Francesco Mattuteia
- (Italy) Mario Meneghetti
- (Italy) Federico Munerati
- (Italy) Pietro Pasinati
- (Italy) Bruno Pesaola
- (Italy) Silvio Piola
- (Italy) Pietro Rava
- (Italy) Mario Renosto
- (Italy) Ettore Reynaudi
- (Italy) Francesco Rosetta
- (Italy) Severino Rosso
- (Italy) Nicola Ventola
- (Italy) Renato Zaccarelli
- (Japan) Takayuki Morimoto
- (Portugal) Bruno Fernandes
- (Romania) George Pușcaș
- (Sweden) Kjell Rosén
- (Switzerland) Haris Seferović
- (Uruguay) Nicolás Fonseca
- (Uruguay) Jorge Andrés Martínez

== Managers ==
- (Hungary) Ferenc Molnár (1931–32)
- (Hungary) Árpád Weisz (1934–35)
- (Argentina) Evaristo Barrera (1956–58)
- (Italy) Carlo Parola (1969–74)
- (Italy) Bruno Bolchi (1978–79)
- (Italy) Angelo Domenghini (1989–90)
- (Italy) Luigi Delneri (1992–94)
- (Italy) Franco Colomba (1994–95)
- (Italy) Alberto Marchetti (1999)
- (Italy) Giuliano Zoratti (1999–00)
- (Italy) Luciano Foschi (2002–04)
- (Italy) Antonio Cabrini (2005–06)
- (Italy) Attilio Tesser (2009–12), Emiliano Mondonico (2012), Attilio Tesser (2012)
- (Italy) Alfredo Aglietti (2012–13)
- (Italy) Alessandro Calori (2013–14)
- (Italy) Alfredo Aglietti (2014)
- (Italy) Marco Baroni (2015–16)
- (Italy) Roberto Boscaglia (2016–17)
- (Italy) Eugenio Corini (2017–18)
- (Italy) Domenico Di Carlo (2017–18)
- (Italy) William Viali (2018–19)
- (Italy) Giuseppe Sannino (2018–19)
- (Italy) William Viali (2018–19)
- (Italy) Simone Banchieri (2019–20)
- (Italy) Simone Banchieri (2020–21)
- (Italy) Michele Marcolini (2020–21)
- (Italy) Simone Banchieri (2020–21)
- (Italy) Marco Marchionni (2021–22)
- (Italy) Franco Semioli (2022–23)
- (Italy) Giacomo Gattuso (2023–24)

== Honours ==
=== League ===
- Serie B
  - Winners: 1926–27, 1937–38, 1947–48
- Serie C
  - Winners: 1964–65, 1969–70, 2009–10, 2014–15
- Serie C2
  - Winners: 1995–96
- Serie D
  - Winners: 2021–22

=== Cups ===
- Supercoppa di Serie C
  - Winners: 2010, 2015

== Divisional movements ==
Series	Years	Last	Promotions	Relegations
A	13	2011–12	-	▼5 (1929, 1937, 1941, 1956, 2012)
B	34	2015–16	▲5 (1927, 1936, 1938, 1948, 2011)	▼5 (1962, 1968, 1977, 2014, 2018)
C +C2	21 +21	2020–21	▲4 (1965, 1970, 2010, 2015) ▲2 (1996 C2, 2003 C2)	▼3 (1981 C1, 1997 C1, 2021✟)
89 out of 90 years of professional football in Italy since 1929
D	1	2021–22	-	-
