= FBC Saronno =

Association football club in Italy

A.S.D. FBC Saronno 1910
- Nicknames: Biancocelesti, FBC, Amaretti
- Founded: 1910 (refounded in 1940 and 2015)
- Dissolved: 1935 and 2010
- Stadium: Stadio Emilio Colombo-Gaetano Gianetti
- Capacity: 1,300
- Chairman: Giuseppe Giglio
- Coach: Marco Varaldi
- League: Eccellenza
- Website: fbcsaronno1910.com
Home colours	Away colours

Associazione Sportiva Dilettantistica Foot-Ball Club Saronno 1910, better known as F.B.C. Saronno or Saronno, is an Italian football club based in the city of Saronno. It plays in the Eccellenza, the fifth division of the Italian league.

Formed in 2015, it aims to be the de facto continuation of the sports tradition that began in 1910 with the birth of the Circolo Sportivo Saronnese (later Saronno Foot-Ball Club) and subsequently transited through various corporate entities, most recently the Associazione Sportiva Saronno F.B.C. 1910, which moved to Gallarate in 2010.

From a historical point of view, Saronno boasts as its greatest success three participations in the Prima Categoria (at that time the highest series of Italian soccer) between 1919 and 1922, without, however, ever having made it past the regional qualifying groups; on the other hand, it has never managed to take part in the Serie A or Serie B round-robin tournament. Since World War II it has played steadily between the third division and amateur categories.

In the 2022-23 season it played in the Promozione Lombardy league, the sixth level of the Italian soccer pyramid.

== History ==
=== From its beginnings to the 1980s ===
The club was founded on March 15, 1910 under the name Circolo Sportivo Saronnese; its first president was Gaetano Gianetti, a Saronnese entrepreneur engaged in the steel trade, who purchased in England (probably in the city of Sheffield) the first white and blue jerseys, along with cleats and balls.

The players were initially mostly students from the local Castelli Archiepiscopal College, together with workers who took up sports in their spare time. The club's first activities consisted of playing friendly matches against other teams from the neighboring towns of Busto Arsizio, Legnano, Monza, Gallarate, Varese, Como and Milan.

After about a couple of years of existence, the club applied for membership in the championships of the Lombardy Regional Committee of the FIGC, which set as a condition for the club's admission the provision of a fenced home ground measuring at least 90x50 m, which was therefore built in front of the local Ursuline school, in Via San Giuseppe.

Beginning in 1912, the club was then able to play its first official competitions, debuting in the Terza Categoria Lombardy championship and succeeding, within less than ten years, to enter the national Prima Categoria (at that time the highest level of Italian soccer). Among the most noteworthy results of the time was a 3-2 home victory over Inter Milan, in a friendly match played on April 15, 1917 (in which, however, both teams took part fielding heavily modified squads, most of the starters being still engaged in World War I: Saronno in particular brought only underage players to the field). Meanwhile, in 1914, the name of the club had been changed to Saronno Foot-Ball Club (abbreviated Saronno F.B.C.).

In the three seasons of its tenure in the Prima Categoria (1919-1920, 1920-1921 and 1921-1922), Saronno showed a good competitive level in the face of renowned opponents. In 1921, for the first and only time in history, a biancoceleste player, Attilio Marcora, was called up to the Italian national team for a friendly against Switzerland.

In 1923, as a result of the reform of the national leagues ordered by the FIGC, Saronno was assigned to the Second Division of the Lega Nord, where it played until the 1927-1928 season, when it won its group and entered the Prima Divisione (which in the meantime had become the national championship); the biancocelesti stayed there until 1935 and were promoted to Serie B in 1931-1932 (however, giving up the chance to compete in the finals). Also in 1931, the biancocelesti began to adopt as their home field the newly built Littorio Stadium (later renamed Colombo-Gianetti after World War II).

In 1935 the club, relegated at the end of the 1934-1935 season (moreover, similarly to all the teams placed below 6th place, very few of which were later admitted to the new Serie C), probably due to difficulties not only of a financial nature (the costs it would have incurred were lower than the previous year's), even gave up registering for the new regional Prima Divisione championship, thus discontinuing its activities: this resulted in its disbarment from the FIGC. In 1939 another club from the city, the Giovani Calciatori Saronnesi, joined the federation and entered the championship, recruiting some former F.B.C. players who had been released.

The club was reborn in 1940 under the name Società Calcistica Saronno, re-affiliating with the FIGC and enrolling at the lowest level of Lombardy's regional championships; in 1942 it reached Serie C, only to disband again in 1943. In the 1943-1944 season another team from the city, Unione Sportiva Velox Gerenzano (at that time a hamlet of Saronno) took over much of S.C. Saronno's roster and enrolled in Lombard tournaments for the next two seasons.

Re-founded again in 1945 and re-affiliated with the FIGC under its old name, F.B.C. Saronno joined the Serie C of Northern Italy: for several seasons in succession the team played between the third, fourth and fifth national divisions, in their various denominations. Among the most positive seasons was 1960-1961, in which President U. Beretta's biancocelesti finished third in the Serie C group A, being promoted to the second division.

Relegated to Serie D at the end of the 1963-1964 season, Saronno re-entered the professional ranks only at the end of the 1988-1989 season. In these years the greatest satisfactions came from the youth academy: in 1983 the under-19 white and blue team won the Italian title in its category, while in 1989 a similar result was achieved in the under-18 category.

=== From the 1990s to the third millennium ===
In 1992 Saronno was taken over by entrepreneur Enrico Preziosi, who strengthened the team (at that time playing in the CND, the top amateur level) and led the team to two second-place finishes in its group in the 1992-1993 and 1993-1994 seasons. In 1994, the biancocelesti were re-promoted to the 1994-1995 Serie C2: making their debut in the fourth division, Saronno hit the promotion play-offs in group A and won them, defeating Lumezzane 2-3 in the final and thus achieving promotion to Serie C1.

The biancocelesti ended the first season in the third division in 13th place in Group A, achieving salvation; in the following championship, also thanks to the presence in the roster of players of the caliber of Antonino Asta and Tommaso Rocchi, Saronno was one of the top teams in Group A, finishing fourth in the regular season and qualifying for the Serie B playoffs.

However, at the end of the season Preziosi decided to put the biancoceleste club up for sale, openly aiming to buy Como. The news, which came after the 1-0 home success achieved in the first leg of the play-off semifinal against Carpi, discouraged the Saronnese players, who lost the return match by 3-0, being ousted from the race to the second division. The following season saw F.B.C. again achieve salvation in the Serie C1 championship, under the management of CEO Federico Ferrarini.

At the end of the 1997-1998 year, the club was acquired by Antonio Intini. The next championship was unlucky: Saronno finished in the relegation zone, finding itself in the play-out against Siena: the confrontation was settled in a double 0-0, which saved the Tuscans by virtue of the best position in the regular season. In the 1999-2000 season Saronno then participated in the C2 championship, from which it was later ousted due to financial defaults, which eventually led to the club's declaration of bankruptcy.

In 2001 a new club called Associazione Calcio Saronno was founded, which took part in the local Terza Categoria championship and then disbanded within a year. In 2002, Saronno's Colombo-Gianetti stadium was used as the home ground by Real Cesate Saronno (a club created by taking advantage of Real Cesate's sports title, thus unrelated to F.B.C.), which won the Eccellenza national playoffs and was promoted to Serie D. In 2003, under the leadership of Giancarlo Ferrario, the club was refounded under the name of Associazione Sportiva Nuovo Saronno F.B.C., taking over from Manera Calcio the right to participate in the Promozione Lombardy championship.

After an interlocutory first year, in 2005 the “new F.B.C.” won the Promozione championship and landed in the Eccellenza; at that time it changed its name to Associazione Sportiva Saronno F.B.C. 1910. Also in 2005, the City of Saronno acquired - by resolution of the City Council No. 24 of January 25, 2005 - the rights of use of the historic name Saronno Foot-Ball Club, which it retained to the end of 2015 and has never ceded to the clubs that subsequently re-used the Saronno name.

In 2006 the club finished 3rd in the Eccellenza championship, qualifying for the regional play-offs: after winning the semifinal against Verbano (1-0 first leg; 2-0 return), it lost the national final valid for Serie D by 1-0 in the match - played on the neutral field of Corbetta - against Corsico. In 2007 Saronno finished in second place in their group of Eccellenza, again qualifying for the promotion play-offs, which, however, they lost 1-0 to F.C. Brembio. In 2008 the biancocelesti finished fourth in their Eccellenza group, only to exit the play-offs following a 1-0 loss to Cantù San Paolo. Less fortunate was the following year: in 2009 Saronno in fact finished 12th in the Eccellenza championship, mathematically avoiding the play-outs only on the penultimate day of the regular season.

=== 2010-2015: transfer of the sports title and inactivity ===
In 2010, the club was taken over by Giampiero Colombelli, who managed to lead the team to first place in its group of Eccellenza, resulting in promotion to Serie D. However, during the following summer the title acquired on the field was sold to the new Gallaratese, which thus participated in the Serie D championship in place of the Associazione Sportiva Saronno F.B.C. 1910, which discontinued its activities and disappeared from the national soccer leagues.

In the summer of 2013, an attempt to refound the club was undertaken, headed by director Luciano Silighini, who together with Luigi De Micheli (listed as president), Giuseppe Anselmo and other partners formed a team called FBCS 1910, with the aim of obtaining from the municipality the concession of use of the historical name Saronno Foot-Ball Club and enroll in the 2013-2014 Promozione Lombardy championship. Negotiations with the Saronno municipal administration (headed by Mayor Luciano Porro) for the concession of the name and the usufruct of the Colombo-Gianetti stadium, however, were unsuccessful, eventually resulting in an exchange of accusations between the parties that precluded the possibility of reaching an agreement.

=== The 2015 re-foundation ===
Saronno's name reappeared only five years later, in 2015, when another local team playing in the Terza Categoria, the Associazione Sportiva Dilettantistica Matteotti Saronno, took over the sports title of the dissolved SolbiaSommese (valid to participate in the Eccellenza Lombardy championship) and changed its name to Associazione Sportiva Dilettantistica Foot-Ball Club Saronno 1910 (abbreviated A. S.D. F.B.C. Saronno 1910), thus intending to place itself de facto in continuity with the biancoceleste history. The president of the "new" Saronno became Antonio Pilato, assisted by general manager Giancarlo Balzaretti: Luca Petrone, back from a season in the youth academy of Caronnese, was chosen as coach of the first team. Not having obtained permission from the municipality of Saronno to play home matches at the old city stadium, the club decided to adopt for the purpose the municipal stadium of Cesate.

The presentation of the new club took place in the center of the city on July 23: on the occasion the jerseys were unveiled and the first players under contract were announced (among whom stood out the name of striker Michele Scavo, already in the team in the 2009-2010 season, who assumed the captain's armband). The following August 9, the team gathered at the sports center in Via Sampietro for the first joint training.

The ‘new Saronno’ was placed in Group A of the Eccellenza Lombardy championship, alongside three other notable teams with professional histories—Legnano, Varese, and Pro Vigevano Suardese, the self-proclaimed heir to Vigevano’s sporting tradition—while also participating in the regional phase of the Coppa Italia Dilettanti.

Given the short period of time between company incorporation, registration for competitions and competitive debut, the roster was assembled in a short time, thus suffering from poor pre-season preparation and deficiencies in some departments. This caused an initial lack of competitiveness, which resulted in immediate elimination from the Coppa Italia Dilettanti (losing both games in their group) and a poor debut in the league (seven defeats and many goals conceded in the first ten days). Failing to improve the performance of the team, which was in fourth last place in the standings, on November 9, 2015, coach Petrone resigned and was replaced by Gianluca Antonelli, who had led the Varese youth team in the previous year.

The change of technical guidance and some new additions to the roster (especially the former professional striker Marco Moro) had the effect of improving the performance of the biancocelesti, who played a high-level second half of the season and moved away from the bottom of the standings.

The 2016-2017 season turned out to be similarly difficult: presented with the favor of the odds at the start of the Eccellenza Lombardy Group A, Saronno started the championship with five consecutive positive results, presenting itself as a top team. In the following matches, however, the biancocelesti suffered numerous defeats and lost ground in the standings; the departure of striker Davide Pizzini and the health problems of president Antonio Pilato, who was forced to temporarily step aside between October 2016 and January 2017, made things more complicated. At the height of the crisis, between March and April 2017 Saronno sank into the play-out zone, managing to get out of it and finally save itself directly only on the last day of the regular season.

In the summer of 2017, both coach Antonelli and Balzaretti resigned from their respective positions: they were succeeded respectively by Andrea Mazza (former coach of the biancocelesti youth teams in the 1999-2000 season, back from his experience on the bench of Brera) and Roberto Corda (the previous year at Accademia Vittuone). Mazza's management lasted only four days, resulting in one victory, two defeats and finally a 4-4 draw against Accademia Gaggiano (where the biancocelesti ended the first half ahead 4-1, only to suffer the opponents' comeback in the second half): thereafter the team had been entrusted ad interim to the athletic trainer Alessandro Artemi on the fifth day, on October 9 the coach Claudio Pilia was hired, back from his experience at Fenegrò (also in the Eccellenza Lombardy) and already at Saronno in the 2004-2005 season as assistant to Attilio Papis. The rotation, however, turned out to be fruitless: in the following eight days the biancocelesti collected only 4 more points (following as many draws); on November 29, Pilia was also relieved of his duties and replaced by Antonio Aiello (back from a brief experience at Avezzano). Already on February 6, 2018, however, the club (with the team still at the bottom of the standings) retraced its steps and recalled Pilia, who, however, resigned at the end of the month after losing 0-6 to Union Villa Cassano, complaining of the impossibility of working at its best in the face of the numerous absences of registered players (replaced with players from the youth team) and of a club that, as admitted by president Pilato, found itself without supporters and in growing economic difficulties. In the following months, the situation continued to worsen: while on the one hand negotiations were underway to try to sell the club, the team (lacking clear technical-managerial guidance and with increasingly reduced human and material resources) racked up several defeats with many goals to spare and finally mathematically relegated to Promozione as early as April 6, losing 2-1 to Accademia Pavese of Sant'Alessio con Vialone.

In the post-season, after the failure to materialize the corporate sale to new investors, Saronno remained in the hands of Pilato, who managed to reorganize the corporate structure with the entry of new partners. In the pre-season, the team was entrusted to Antonio Cernivivo, who was, however, exonerated after the first rounds of the regional Italian Cup: on the first day of the championship, Stefano Imburgia, promoted from the youth team, took over as manager. Stability, however, proved ephemeral: finding itself short of resources again, the biancoceleste club lost its top players and ended up relegated to the Prima Categoria.

In the meantime, the municipality of Saronno managed to complete the renovation of the Colombo-Gianetti stadium, allowing the team to return to play its home matches there.

In the summer of 2019, the ownership of the club changed hands: in fact, Pilato sold Saronno to a group of individuals, some of whom were previously linked to Ardor Lazzate. The presidency went to Simone Sartori, assisted by vice-president Paolo Galli, board member Marco Marzorati and sports director Simone Morandi. The season (prematurely interrupted by the outbreak of the COVID-19 pandemic) saw the biancocelesti stand at the top of their group, but without ever fully challenging the leader Lentatese: at the end of the championship, they finished in second place.

The following year, the pandemic also led to an early end to the season; in the summer of 2021, however, the club managed to return to Promozione through the merger by incorporation of ASD Gorla Maggiore. At the same time, a convergence was undertaken with Sporting Cesate, which changed its name to SC United and started a joint management of the youth sectors. In the 2021-2022 year, the biancoceleste first team finished in fourth position in its group, without being able to concretely fight for the top. The following year, the club reorganized with new president Francesco Paolo Gravina (later replaced by Giuseppe Giglio) and the addition of general manager Marco Proserpio and sports director Fabio Viganò. After a shaky start, Saronno (led by Danilo Tricarico) managed to present itself as a top team and climbed to the top of the Promozione Lombardy Group A table on the 14th day, gradually distancing itself from its direct rivals BaSe 96 and Meda, until securing the championship victory and the return to Eccellenza after 5 years.

== Timeline ==
Timeline of Associazione Sportiva Dilettantistica Foot-Ball Club Saronno 1910
- 1910 - In March the Circolo Sportivo Saronnese is founded.
- 1910-1912 - Activities at the local level.
- 1912 - Becomes affiliated with the Lombardy Regional Committee (CRL) of the FIGC. Admitted to the Terza Categoria Lombardy championship.
- 1912-1913 - 4th in group B of the Terza Categoria Lombarda.
- 1913-1914 - 6th in group A of the Terza Categoria Lombarda. Enters the Promozione championship after fencing and homologating its field according to the regulations in force at the time.
- 1914 - Circolo Sportivo Saronnese changes its name to Saronno Foot-Ball Club.
- 1914-1915 - 5th in the final group of the Promozione Lombardy, interrupted due to the outbreak of World War I.
- 1915-1916 - 3rd in group C of the Terza Categoria Lombarda, fielding the reserve team.

Finalist of the Lombardy Regional Cup.

- 1916-1917 - 7th in the Lombardy Regional Cup.
- 1917-1918 - 7th in the Mauro Cup for first teams.

6th in the Saronno Cup for reserve teams.
5th in the International Cup for reserve teams.

- 1918-1919 - Eliminated in the Giuriati Cup.

5th in the Targa Burba for reserve teams.
5th in the Biffi Cup for first teams.
5th in the Mauro Cup for first teams.
5th in the Lombard championship for reserve teams.
5th in the Lombardo Juniores championship.

- 1919 - Saronno F.B.C. is automatically admitted by the Regional Committee of Lombardy to the Prima Categoria, after the compilation of the cadre, for the recognized technical-sporting ability.
- 1919-1920 - 3rd in group C of the Prima Categoria Lombarda.
- 1920-1921 - 1st in group E of the Prima Categoria Lombarda.

5th in the final organized by the regional committee.

- 1921 - Saronno F.B.C. does not vote for the Pozzo Project and remains affiliated with the FIGC.
- 1921-1922 - 3rd in group A of the Prima Categoria Lombarda. Affiliated with the Lega Nord in the Seconda Divisione.

Second round of the Coppa Italia.

- 1922-1923 - 3rd in group B of the Seconda Divisione.
- 1923-1924 - 7th in group B of the Seconda Divisione after losing the play-off. Relegated to the Terza Divisione.
- 1924-1925 - 2nd in group B of the Third Division of Lombardy.
- 1925-1926 - 3rd in group B of the Third Division of Lombardy.
- 1926-1927 - 2nd in group B of the Third Division of Lombardy. Admitted to the Seconda Divisione Nord by league enlargement.

Knockout phase of the Coppa Italia. (Note: The competition was stopped in the round of 16 due to lack of available match dates.)

- 1927-1928 - 1st in group B of the Seconda Divisione Nord. Forfeited the finals for the title. Allocated to the third tier as part of the reform of the leagues, it enters the Direttorio Divisioni Superiori.
- 1928-1929 - 14th in group B of the Prima Divisione.
- 1929-1930 - 15th in the group B of the Prima Divisione. Readmitted due to enlargement of the cadre of the category.
- 1930-1931 - 9th in the group C of the Prima Divisione.
- 1931-1932 - 2nd in the group C of the Prima Divisione. Wins the play-off for admission to the promotion finals, but in light of its debt situation renounces competing in the final group, unable to meet the costs of the Serie B.
- 1932-1933 - 7th in group B of the Prima Divisione.
- 1933-1934 - 7th in group C of the Prima Divisione.
- 1934-1935 - 9th in group B of the Prima Divisione.
- 1935 - Saronno F.B.C., relegated to the Prima Divisione, renounces to play in the championship due to the loss of several players who left for the Ethiopian War: it is subsequently removed from the FIGC federal roster for inactivity.
- 1935-1940 - The club remains inactive. In 1939 the club of Giovani Calciatori Saronnesi joins the FIGC and enrolls some of the former Saronno F.B.C. players, competing in both the federal and provincial championships of the Propaganda Section of Como.
- 1940 - The club is refounded under the name Società Calcistica Saronno and included in the Lombardy regional championships.
- 1940-1941 - 1st in group C of the Lombardy Second Division. Loses the promotion finals but is still promoted to the Lombardy First Division.
- 1941-1942 - 1st in group F of the Lombardy First Division. 2nd in the Lombard group of the finals. Promoted to Serie C.
- 1942 - S.C. Saronno incorporates Unione Sportiva Velox Saronno, playing in Lombardy's First Division.
- 1942-1943 - 10th in group D of the Serie C.
- 1943 - S.C. Saronno does not participate in the next Serie C championship and loses its affiliation with the FIGC. The Unione Sportiva Velox of Gerenzano (then a hamlet of Saronno) enrolls in the Lombardy regional tournaments by signing up many former players from the defunct club.
- 1943-1945 - The club remains inactive.
- 1945 - Saronno Foot-Ball Club is refounded and becomes affiliated with the FIGC, which admits it to the Serie C Alta Italia.
- 1945-1946 - 6th in group F of the Serie C Alta Italia.
- 1946-1947 - 6th in the group C of the Northern Interregional League's Serie C.
- 1947-1948 - 6th in group E of the Northern Interregional League's Serie C. Relegated to the Promozione.
- 1948-1949 - 5th in the group C of the Promozione.
- 1949-1950 - 1st in group D of the Promozione. Promoted to Serie C.
- 1950-1951 - 10th in the group A of the Serie C.
- 1951-1952 - 11th in the group A of the Serie C. Relegated to the new IV Serie championship.
- 1952-1953 - 9th in the group A of the IV Serie.
- 1953-1954 - 7th in the group A of the IV Serie.
- 1954-1955 - 10th in the group B of the IV Serie.
- 1955-1956 - 12th in the group B of the IV Serie.
- 1956-1957 - 10th in the group B of the IV Serie.
- 1957-1958 - 2nd in group B of the Second Interregional Category.
- 1958-1959 - 2nd in the group B of the Interregional.
- 1959-1960 - 1st in the group B of the Serie D. Promoted to the Serie C.
- 1960-1961 - 3rd in group A of the Serie C.
- 1961-1962 - 16th in group A of Serie C after winning the play-off.
- 1962-1963 - 16th in the group A of the Serie C.
- 1963-1964 - 18th in the group A of the Serie C. Relegated to Serie D.
- 1964-1965 - 15th in the group B of the Serie D.
- 1965-1966 - 8th in the group B of the Serie D.
- 1966-1967 - 15th in the group B of the Serie D.
- 1967-1968 - 18th in the group B of the Serie D. Relegated to Promozione.
- 1968-1969 - 3rd in the group B of the Promozione Lombarda.
- 1969-1970 - 12th in group A of the Promozione Lombarda.
- 1970-1971 - 9th in group A of the Promozione Lombarda.
- 1971-1972 - 7th in group A of the Promozione Lombarda.
- 1972-1973 - 5th in group C of the Promozione Lombarda.
- 1973-1974 - 8th in group A of the Promozione Lombarda.
- 1974-1975 - 7th in group A of the Promozione Lombarda.
- 1975-1976 - 2nd in group A of the Promozione Lombarda.
- 1976-1977 - 13th in group A of the Promozione Lombarda.
- 1977-1978 - 3rd in group A of the Promozione Lombarda.
- 1978-1979 - 1st in group A of the Promozione Lombarda. Wins the promotion playoffs. Promoted to Serie D.
- 1979-1980 - 10th in group B of Serie D.
- 1980-1981 - 15th in group B of Serie D.
- 1981-1982 - 8th in group B of the Interregional.
- 1982-1983 - 7th in group B of the Interregional.
- 1983-1984 - 16th in group B of the Interregional. Relegated to the Promozione Lombarda.
- 1984-1985 - 9th in group A of the Promozione Lombarda.
- 1985-1986 - 1st in group A of the Promozione Lombarda. Wins the promotion playoffs. Promoted to the Interregional.
- 1986-1987 - 8th in group B of the Interregional.
- 1987-1988 - 5th in group B of the Interregional.
- 1988-1989 - 3rd in group B of the Interregional.
- 1989-1990 - 1st in group B of the Interregional. Promoted to Serie C2.
- 1990-1991 - 17th in group B of the Serie C2. Relegated to the Interregional.

Group stage of the Coppa Italia Serie C.

- 1991-1992 - 6th in group A of the Interregional.
- 1992-1993 - 2nd in group A of the National Amateur Championship.
- 1993-1994 - 2nd in group B of the National Amateur Championship. Admitted to Serie C2 upon completion of personnel.
- 1994-1995 - 2nd in group A of the Serie C2. Wins the play-offs. Promoted to Serie C1.

First round of the Coppa Italia Serie C.

- 1995-1996 - 13th in group A of Serie C1.

Second round of the Coppa Italia Serie C.

- 1996-1997 - 4th in group A of Serie C1. Loses the play-off semifinals.

First round of the Coppa Italia Serie C.

- 1997-1998 - 12th in group A of Serie C1.

Group stage of the Coppa Italia Serie C.

- 1998-1999 - 16th in group A of Serie C1. Loses the play-outs. Relegated to Serie C2.

Knockout phase of Coppa Italia Serie C.

- 1999-2000 - 8th in group A of Serie C2.

Group stage of the Coppa Italia Serie C.

- 2000 - Saronno F.B.C. is excluded from Serie C2 as it does not have an adequate playing field; having then failed to enter the Lombardy regional championships, it is struck off the FIGC federal roster. Re-founded under the name of Associazione Calcio Saronno Calcio, it joins the Lombardy Regional Committee and restarts from the Terza Categoria.
- 2000-2001 - 4th in group B of the Terza Categoria of Legnano. Admitted to Seconda Categoria Lombardia upon completion of personnel.
- 2001-2002 - 16th in group N of Seconda Categoria Lombardia. Relegated to Terza Categoria.
- 2002 - A.C. Saronno Calcio does not join the Terza Categoria of Varese and ceases activities.
- 2002-2003 - The club remains inactive.
- 2003 - Associazione Sportiva Manera Calcio of Manera di Lomazzo (CO), winner of the Prima Categoria Lombardia's group G, moves its headquarters to Rovello Porro (CO) and assumes the name Associazione Calcio Nuovo Saronno F.B.C.
- 2003-2004 - 8th in the group A of Promozione Lombardia.
- 2004-2005 - 1st in group A of Promozione Lombardia. Promoted to Eccellenza.
- 2005-2006 - 3rd in group A of Eccellenza Lombardia.
- 2006 - A.C. Nuovo Saronno F.B.C. merges with Saronno Calcio (formed from the merger of the former Prealpi and Matteotti di Saronno clubs and playing in group Q of the Seconda Categoria Lombardia) and changes its name to Associazione Sportiva F.B.C. Saronno 1910.
- 2006-2007 - 3rd in group A of the Eccellenza Lombardia.

Elimination phase of Coppa Italia Dilettanti Lombardia.

- 2007-2008 - 5th in group A of the Eccellenza Lombardia.
- 2008-2009 - 12th in group A of the Eccellenza Lombardia.
- 2009-2010 - 1st in group A of the Eccellenza Lombardia. Promoted to Serie D.
- 2010 - A.S. F.B.C. Saronno 1910 sells its sports title to Gallaratese and ceases activities.
- 2010-2015 - The club remains inactive.
- 2015 - The Associazione Sportiva Dilettantistica Matteotti takes over the sports title of the discontinued SolbiaSommese Calcio and changes its name to Associazione Sportiva Dilettantistica Foot-Ball Club Saronno 1910, adopting the white-sky-blue social colors and registering in the Eccellenza Lombardia championship.
- 2015-2016 - 10th in group A of the Eccellenza Lombardia.

First round of the Coppa Italia Dilettanti Lombardia.

- 2016-2017 - 12th in group A of the Eccellenza Lombardia.

First round of Coppa Italia Dilettanti Lombardia.

- 2017-2018 - 17th in group A of the Eccellenza Lombardia. Relegated to Promozione.

First round of Coppa Italia Dilettanti Lombardia.

- 2018-2019 - 16th in group A of the Promozione Lombardia. Relegated to the Prima Categoria.
- 2019-2020 - 2nd in group B of the Prima Categoria Lombardia.
- 2020-2021 - Participates in group B of the Prima Categoria Lombardia. Championship cancelled due to COVID-19.
- 2021 - A.S.D. F.B.C. Saronno 1910 incorporates Associazione Sportiva Dilettantistica Gorla Maggiore and obtains the right to play in Promozione.
- 2021-2022 - 4th in group A of the Promozione Lombardia.
- 2022-2023 - 1st in group A of the Promozione Lombardia. Promoted to Eccellenza.
- 2023-2024 - 10th in group A of the Eccellenza Lombardia.

== Colors and symbols ==
=== Colors ===
The Saronno municipal flag, adopted in 2003: the blue-white colors (hence the sky blue) have been characteristic of the town's heraldry since the 16th century.

The historical colors of F.B.C. Saronno are white and sky blue, which in the home uniform usually appear arranged in vertical stripes of equal width. The choice of these colors was made by the club's first president, Gaetano Gianetti, who, during a business trip to Sheffield, managed to buy a batch of white and sky blue shirts (the same colors used by Sheffield Wednesday) at a discount.

White and sky blue, however, are two colors strongly linked to the symbolism of Saronno: in fact, they characterize the municipal coat of arms in use from the 16th century until 1932 and the municipal flag adopted in 2003.

The secondary jerseys, on the other hand, are generally in solid colors: the most recurring colors include red, white, and light blue.

=== Official symbols ===
==== Coat of arms ====
The coat of arms adopted in 2015 - selected following an online survey conducted by the club - consists of an ogive with vertical black-and-white stripes, bearing at the top the initials FBC, in the middle the words Saronno 1910 and below a reproduction of the city's coat of arms.

The club's historical emblem, adopted on several occasions until 2010, also featured an ogive shape, with a blue circle in the center containing the word Saronno, surmounted by the tower borrowed from the city's coat of arms; below it was the FBC monogram and the year the club was founded (1910).

==== Anthem ====
Saronno, composed by Dario Baldan Bembo, is the club's official anthem.

== Facilities ==
=== Stadium ===
After making use of various grounds (located in different parts of the city) in the first two decades of its existence, from 1931 to 2010 Saronno played its home matches at the Emilio Colombo-Gaetano Gianetti Stadium, a multi-sport facility with seating for approximately 4,000 spectators. This facility, however, at the advent of the 3rd millennium, is in such a precarious and dilapidated condition that its capacity is limited to only 99 seats.

The stadium, originally named Stadio del Littorio, after the fall of fascism was dedicated to journalist Emilio Colombo (editor of La Gazzetta dello Sport and Guerin Sportivo) and later also to the founder of the club, Gaetano Gianetti.

In 2015, following the reconstitution of the club, the management requested the use of the Colombo-Gianetti as the home ground; however, the Municipality of Saronno refused the request, deeming the facility inadequate (by virtue of the aforementioned dilapidation) to the standards of the 2015-2016 Eccellenza Lombardia championship, to which the F.B.C. had registered, and extending the concession of the facility to Robur Saronno (a club playing in lower divisions, which has been playing its home matches there since 2010). The biancazzurri then chose as their home field the municipal stadium of the neighboring municipality of Cesate, capable of accommodating about 1,000 spectators in a single, partially covered grandstand (arranged on the west side of the field).

Since 2018, once the renovation was completed, Saronno returned to play its home matches at Colombo-Gianetti.

=== Training center ===
Since the 2015-2016 season, Saronno's players have been carrying out their training at the local Matteotti Sports Center in Via Sampietro, where until the previous year the A.S.D. Matteotti, the forerunner club of the refounding of the team, had its headquarters. The center also constitutes the ground of the youth teams' home matches.

Since 2018, the club has also been managing the Prealpi Sports Center in Via Sabotino.

Both facilities are municipally owned.

== Organization ==
=== Technical staff ===
Updated as of February 11, 2020:

==== Administrative area staff ====
- (Italy) Simone Sartori - president
- (Italy) Paolo Galli - vice chairman
- (Italy) Marco Marzorati - board member with marketing responsibilities
- (Italy) Simone Morandi - sports director
- (Italy) Ottavio Vellone - "SC United" youth sports director
- (Italy) Rosalba Terranova - youth secretary
- (Italy) Giuseppe Giglio - team manager
- (Italy) Matteo Romanò - press officer
- (Italy) Carlo Mantegazza - facilities manager

=== Sponsors ===
The following is a timeline of Saronno's technical suppliers.

==== Timeline of technical sponsors ====
- until 1991 ...
- 1991-1995 Umbro
- 1995-1996 Asics
- 1996-1997 ...
- 1997-1998 Garman
- 1998-2002 ...
- 2002-2003 Hawk
- 2003-2009 ...
- 2009-2010 Erreà
- 2010-2015 none (the club was inactive)
- 2015-2018 Primato
- 2018-2019 Adidas
- 2019-2021 Mizuno
- 2021-2022 Primato
- 2022- Givova

=== Youth sector ===
For the 2019-2020 season, Saronno's youth sector consisted of ten teams, distributed as follows:

- 1 under-19 team
- 1 under-17 team
- 2 under-15 teams
- 3 under-12 teams
- 3 under-11 teams

They are joined by the Primi Calci (First Kicks) team, devoted to the management of basic activities and introduction to sports practice.

The home field and training venue of the youth sector is the Matteotti Sports Center in Via Sampietro in Saronno.

Since 2020, Saronno's youth teams have been part of the Soccer Academy network, belonging to Genoa.

== Coaches and presidents ==
The following is a timeline of Saronno's coaches and presidents.

=== Coaches ===
- 1910-1950 ...
- 1927-1928 None (team led by a technical committee)
- 1928-1931 ...
- 1931-1932 (Italy) Federico Dellavalle
- 1932-1935 ...
- 1935-1940 none (the club was inactive)
- 1940-1943 ...
- 1943-1945 none (the club was inactive)
- 1945-1950 ...
- 1950-1952 (Italy) Felice Renoldi
- 1952-1959 ...
- 1959-1962 (Italy) Giuseppe Lupi
- 1962-1963 (Italy) Enrico Boniforti
  (Italy) Carlo Kaffenigg
- 1963-1964 (Italy) Gino Cortellezzi
- 1964-1988 ...
- 1988-1991 (Italy) Antonio Sala
- 1991-1992 ...
- 1992-1994 (Italy) Simone Boldini
- 1994 (Italy) Roberto Bacchin
- 1994-1995 (Italy) Giuseppe Savoldi
- 1995-1996 (Italy) Eugenio Bersellini
- 1996-1997 (Italy) Mario Beretta
- 1997-1998 (Italy) Giovanni Trainini
- 1998-1999 (Italy) Carlo Muraro
- 1999-2004 ...
- 2004-2005 (Italy) Attilio Papis
- 2005-2009 ...
- 2009-2010 (Italy) Paolo Bertani
- 2010-2015 none (the club was inactive)
- 2015-2016 (Italy) Luca Petrone (1ª-10ª)
  (Italy) Gianluca Antonelli (11ª-30ª)
- 2016-2017 (Italy) Gianluca Antonelli
- 2017-2018 (Italy) Andrea Mazza (1ª-4ª)
  (Italy) Alessandro Artemi (5ª)
  (Italy) Claudio Pilia (6ª-13ª)
  (Italy) Antonio Aiello (14ª-30ª)
- 2018-2019 (Italy) Antonio Cernivivo (preseason)
  (Italy) Stefano Imburgia (championship)
- 2019-2021 (Italy) Gianpaolo Chiodini
- 2021-2022 (Italy) Niccolò Taroni
- 2022- (Italy) Danilo Tricarico

=== Presidents ===
- 1910-1924 (Italy) Gaetano Gianetti
- 1924-1929 (Italy) Angelo Marini
- 1929-1933 (Italy) Gianni Morganti
- 1933-1937 (Italy) Ugo Brebbia
- 1938-1940 none (the club was inactive)
- 1940-1943 (Italy) Giovanni Legnani
- 1943-1945 none (the club was inactive)
- 1945-1947 (Italy) Antonio Canti
- 1947-1951 (Italy) Guglielmo Landone
- 1951-1952 (Italy) Gino Colombo
- 1952-1953 (Italy) Gianni Bavera
- 1953-1957 (Italy) Giulio Volontè
- 1957-1960 (Italy) Umberto Beretta
- 1960-1965 (Italy) Edoardo Parma
- 1965-1981 (Italy) Giulio Volontè
- 1981-1986 (Italy) Giuseppe Zoni
- 1986-1989 (Italy) Giuseppe Poj
- 1989-1991 (Italy) Vincenzo Minutolo
- 1991-1992 (Italy) Paolo La Pietra, (Italy) Valentino Crotti
- 1992-1997 (Italy) Enrico Preziosi
- 1997-1998 (Italy) Federico Ferrarini
- 1998-1999 (Italy) Antonio Intini
- 1999-2000 (Italy) Roberto Stefani
- 2000-2003 none (the club was inactive)
- 2003-2005 (Italy) Giancarlo Ferrario
- 2005-2009 (Italy) Vito Tramacere
- 2009-2010 (Italy) Giampiero Colombelli
- 2010-2015 none (the club was inactive)
- 2015-2019 (Italy) Antonio Pilato
- 2019-2022 (Italy) Simone Sartori
- 2022-2023 (Italy) Francesco Paolo Gravina
- 2023- (Italy) Giuseppe Giglio

== Players ==
=== Captains ===
- (Italy) Nino Biffi (1910-1915)
- .. (1915-2015)
- (Italy) Michele Scavo (2015-2018)
- .. (2018-2022)
- (Italy) Giovanni Bello (2022-)

=== Contribution to the national team ===
The only Saronno footballer to have ever worn the jersey of a national team was Attilio Marcora, who on November 6, 1921 was called up (for the first and only time in his career) to the Italian national team for a friendly match against Switzerland, which ended 1-1.

== Honours ==
=== Interregional competitions ===
- Serie D: 1

1959-1960 (group B)

- Interregional Championship: 1

1989-1990 (group B)

=== Regional competitions ===
- Prima Divisione: 1

1941-1942 (group F)

- Eccellenza: 1

2009-2010 (group A)

- Promozione: 3

1978-1979 (group A), 2004-2005 (group A), 2022-2023 (group A)

=== Other placements ===
- Serie C

Third place: 1960-1961 (group A)

- Prima Divisione

Second place: 1931-1932 (group C)

- Serie C2

Victory in the playoffs: 1994-1995 (group A)

- Interregional Championship

Second place: 1958-1959 (group B)

- Promozione

Second place: 1975-1976 (group A)
Third place: 1977-1978 (group A)

== Statistics and records ==
=== Participation in championships ===
National and interregional championships

Level	Division	Participations	Debut	Last season	Total
2º	Seconda Divisione (Note: Organized by the Lega Nord.)	2	1922-1923	1923-1924	2
3º	Seconda Divisione (Note: Organized by the Direttorio Divisioni Inferiori Nord.)	1	1927-1928		22
3º	Prima Divisione (Note: Organized by the Direttorio Divisioni Superiori.)	7	1928-1929	1934-1935	22
3º	Serie C	10	1945-1946	1963-1964	22
3º	Serie C1	4	1995-1996	1998-1999	22
4º	Promozione	2	1948-1949	1949-1950	16
4º	IV Serie	5	1952-1953	1956-1957	16
4º	Interregional Championship	1	1958-1959		16
4º	Serie D	5	1959-1960	1967-1968	16
4º	Serie C2	3	1990-1991	1999-2000	16
5º	Interregional Championship - 2° Cat.	1	1957-1958		13
5º	Serie D	2	1979-1980	1980-1981	13
5º	Interregional Championship	8	1981-1982	1991-1992	13
5º	National Amateur Championship	2	1992-1993	1993-1994	13

Regional championships

Level	Division	Participations	Debut	Last season	Total
I	Prima Categoria (Note: The highest level of Italian football at the time.)	3	1919-1920	1921-1922	28
I	Terza Divisione (Note: The 1924-1925 and 1925-1926 championships were the third tier of the Italian Soccer League at the time, and the 1926-1927 championship was the fourth tier.)	3	1924-1925	1926-1927	28
I	Prima Divisione (Note: At the time, the fourth division of Italian football.)	1	1941-1942		28
I	Promozione (Note: At the time, the fourth division of Italian football.)	13	1968-1969	1985-1985	28
I	Eccellenza (Note: Sixth tier of the Italian football league from 2005 to 2010, fifth tier from 2015)	8	2005-2006	2017-2018	28
II	Promozione (Note: At the time, the 1913-1914 championship was the second tier of the Italian Soccer League, and the 2003-2004 and 2004-2005 championships were the seventh tier.)	4	1914-1915	2018-2019	5
II	Seconda Divisione (Note: At the time, the fifth division of the Italian football league.)	1	1940-1941		5
III	Terza Categoria (Note: At the time, the third division of the Italian football league.)	3	1912-1913	1915-1916	4
III	Prima Categoria	1	2019-2020		4
IV	Seconda Categoria (Note: At the time, the ninth level of the Italian football league.)	1	2001-2002		1
V	Terza Categoria (Note: At the time, 10th level of the Italian football league.)	1	2000-2001		1

== Supporters ==
=== History ===
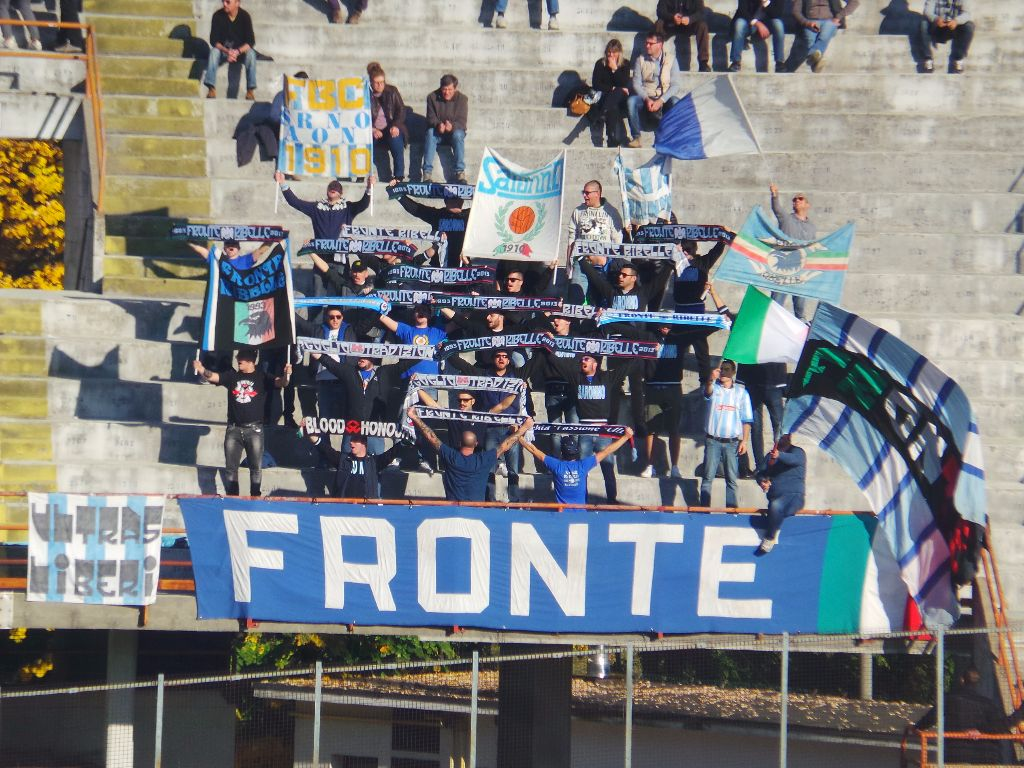
Saronno Ultras at the Franco Ossola Stadium in Varese during an FBC away game.

The ultras movement in Saronno originated with the establishment of the Ultras Saronno in 1981. Seven years later, in 1988, the Boys were formed. In 1993 old and new ultras from the two groups, due to internal difficulties within the various associations, decided to unite in the Fronte Ribelle Saronno (abbreviated FRS 93), which throughout the 3rd millennium represents the only organized fan group permanently following Saronno. With the birth of the Fronte Ribelle, coinciding with a lowering of the average age of members, the first bus and train trips began to be organized.

Even during the club's period of inactivity, which lasted from 2010 to 2015, the Fronte Ribelle did not disband and continued to engage in extra-football activities, often socially inspired, as well as lobbying for the refounding of the F.B.C. In September 2013, the group celebrated the 20th anniversary of its founding by parading through the streets of the city center in order to remark on the vitality of the ultras movement in spite of the absence of a representative team. In 2015, the group endorsed and supported the re-foundation of the club from the very beginning.

In political terms, the Fronte Ribelle group takes positions that are close to paternalistic conservatism.

Other groups that supported the Fronte Ribelle over the years were the Raus Group and the Solaro Section, both of which were disbanded.

=== Twinning and rivalries ===
Saronno's fans are twinned with those of Varese, the main soccer team of the provincial capital, through which they also maintain a good relationship with Inter ultras. Very close is also the relationship with the fans of Sheffield Wednesday, with whom an official twinning was celebrated in 2008: the origins of this relationship date back to 1910, when Gaetano Gianetti, the first president of Saronno, bought precisely in Sheffield the first playing equipment (jerseys, shoes and balls) for the club. In addition, according to some sources, FBC's own white and sky blue colors were borrowed exactly from Wednesday's similar colors.

Outside national borders, Saronnese supporters also maintain good relations with the Swiss supporters of Bellinzona and (through Varese) with the Ultra Yomus of Valencia.

On the other hand, there is a heated rivalry with the Legnano supporters: on several occasions between the 1990s and the beginning of the 3rd millennium the opposing fans engaged in violent skirmishes on match days. Equally heated is the rivalry with the supporters of Como, who are also the main opponents of the twinned Varese fans; finally, negative relations exist with the supporters of Pro Patria, Alessandria, Carrarese, Lecco, Monza, Pistoiese and Inveruno.

== See also ==
- Saronno

== Bibliography ==
- De Micheli, Luigi Angelo (2000). Saronno F.B.C. - Un giovanotto di 90 anni [Saronno F.B.C. - A 90 year old young man.] (in Italian). Saronno: Grafiche Luigi Monti.
- Match statistics and directives published by La Gazzetta dello Sport (preserved by the Biblioteca di Brera in Milan and B.N.C.F. in Florence).
