= List of AC Monza seasons =

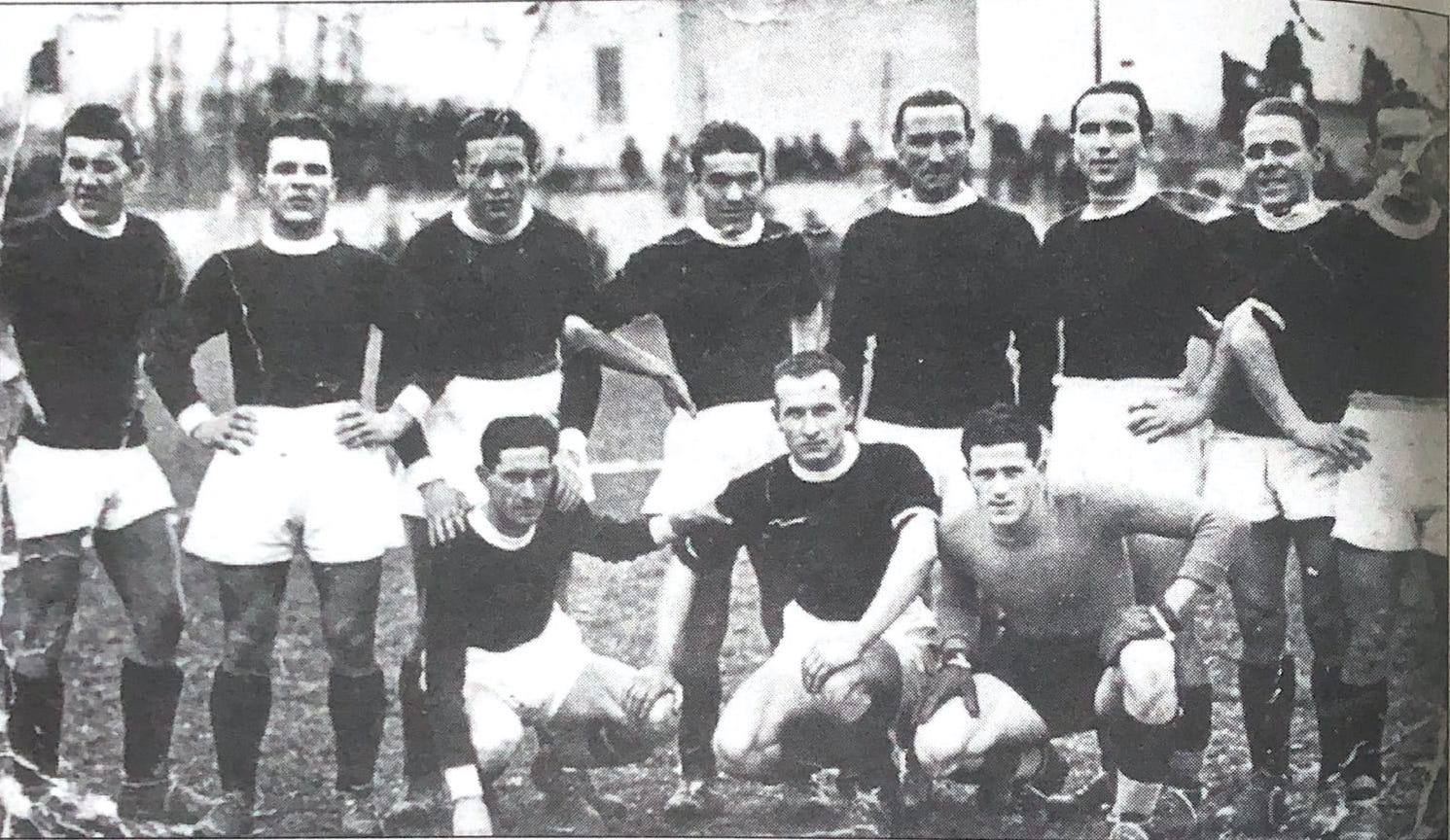
Monza's lineup during the 1938–39 season, in which they became the first Serie C team to reach the quarter-finals of the Coppa Italia

Associazione Calcio Monza is an Italian professional football club based in Monza, Lombardy. The club was formed in 1912 as Monza Foot-Ball Club, and first took part in the Terza Categoria (third level) in the 1913–14 season as AC Monza.

Monza first played in the Coppa Italia – the Italian domestic cup – in the 1926–27 season, where they reached the third round. In the 1938–39 season, Monza reached the quarter-finals of the Coppa Italia, becoming the first Serie C side to do so. The club was first promoted to the Serie B in 1951. Prior to their first Serie A promotion in 2022, Monza played 40 Serie B seasons throughout their history, the most of any Italian club without playing in the top flight. Monza have won the Coppa Italia Serie C a record four times, the Serie C championship four times, and an Anglo-Italian Cup.

This list details the club's placement in the league, the major national cups (Coppa Italia, Supercoppa Italiana), and other FIGC-sanctioned cups (Coppa Italia Serie C, Supercoppa di Serie C, and Coppa Italia Serie D).

== Key ==
- GS = Group stage
- QR = Qualifying round
- PR = Preliminary round
- SBInt = Serie B intermediate round
- SCR = Serie C round
- R1 = Round 1
- R2 = Round 2
- R3 = Round 3
- R3 = Round 4
- RInt = Intermediate round
- R64 = Round of 64
- R32 = Round of 32
- QR16 = Round of 16 qualification
- R16 = Round of 16
- QF = Quarter-finals

Winners	Runners-up	Promoted	Relegated

== Seasons ==
Results of league and cup competitions by season
Season	League			Cup				
Season	Tier	Division	Position	Coppa Italia	Supercoppa	Coppa Italia Serie C	Supercoppa Serie C (Note: Coppa Italia Semiprofessionisti until 1981)	Coppa Italia Serie D (Note: Coppa Italia Dilettanti until 1999)
1913–14	3	Terza Categoria Lombardia, Group B	3rd	—N/a	—N/a	—N/a	—N/a	—N/a
1914–15	2	Promozione Lombardia, Group B	6th of 6	—N/a	—N/a	—N/a	—N/a	—N/a
1915 to 1919	Monza took part in non-FIGC sanctioned tournaments			—N/a	—N/a	—N/a	—N/a	—N/a
1919–20	2	Promozione Lombardia, Group B	1st of 5 (Note: 2nd of 5 in promotion play-offs (promoted))	—N/a	—N/a	—N/a	—N/a	—N/a
1920–21	1	Prima Categoria Lombardia qualifications, Group B	4th of 4	—N/a	—N/a	—N/a	—N/a	—N/a
1921–22	1	Prima Categoria Lombardia qualifications, Group C	2nd of 4		—N/a	—N/a	—N/a	—N/a
1922–23	2	Seconda Divisione Lega Nord, Group C	6th of 8 (Note: Relegation play-off match win)	—N/a	—N/a	—N/a	—N/a	—N/a
1923–24	2	Seconda Divisione Lega Nord, Group C	4th of 8	—N/a	—N/a	—N/a	—N/a	—N/a
1924–25	2	Seconda Divisione Lega Nord, Group B	5th of 10	—N/a	—N/a	—N/a	—N/a	—N/a
1925–26	2	Seconda Divisione Lega Nord, Group B	10th of 11	—N/a	—N/a	—N/a	—N/a	—N/a
1926–27	3	Seconda Divisione Nord, Group B	1st of 10 (Note: Seconda Divisione Nord play-off winner)	R3 (Note: Monza and Ponziana drew 1–1 in the third round, and were due to play a replay match. However, the competition was interrupted in the round of 32 due to lack of interest.)	—N/a	—N/a	—N/a	—N/a
1927–28	2	Prima Divisione, Group B	6th of 10	—N/a	—N/a	—N/a	—N/a	—N/a
1928–29	2	Prima Divisione, Group B	7th of 14	—N/a	—N/a	—N/a	—N/a	—N/a
1929–30	3	Prima Divisione Nord, Group B	4th of 15	—N/a	—N/a	—N/a	—N/a	—N/a
1930–31	3	Prima Divisione Nord, Group C	7th of 14	—N/a	—N/a	—N/a	—N/a	—N/a
1931–32	3	Prima Divisione, Group C	4th of 15	—N/a	—N/a	—N/a	—N/a	—N/a
1932–33	3	Prima Divisione, Group A	6th of 12	—N/a	—N/a	—N/a	—N/a	—N/a
1933–34	3	Prima Divisione, Group B	1st of 14 (Note: 4th of 4 in Group A of promotion play-offs)	—N/a	—N/a	—N/a	—N/a	—N/a
1934–35	3	Prima Divisione, Group B	3rd of 14	—N/a	—N/a	—N/a	—N/a	—N/a
1935–36	3	Serie C, Group B	5th of 16	SCR1	—N/a	—N/a	—N/a	—N/a
1936–37	3	Serie C, Group B	12th of 16	QR	—N/a	—N/a	—N/a	—N/a
1937–38	3	Serie C, Group B	10th of 15	PR1	—N/a	—N/a	—N/a	—N/a
1938–39	3	Serie C, Group B	9th of 14	QF	—N/a	—N/a	—N/a	—N/a
1939–40	3	Serie C, Group C	12th of 15	R3	—N/a	—N/a	—N/a	—N/a
1940–41	3	Serie C, Group B	16th of 16	SCR	—N/a	—N/a	—N/a	—N/a
1941–42	4	Prima Divisione Lombardia, Group C	2nd of 7 (Note: 5th of 7 in promotion play-offs. Despite not being promoted via play-offs, Monza was later admitted to Serie C.)		—N/a	—N/a	—N/a	—N/a
1942–43	3	Serie C, Group C	9th of 13		—N/a	—N/a	—N/a	—N/a
1943–44	Monza took part in non-FIGC sanctioned tournaments			—N/a	—N/a	—N/a	—N/a	—N/a
1944–45	Monza took part in non-FIGC sanctioned tournaments			—N/a	—N/a	—N/a	—N/a	—N/a
1945–46	3	Serie C North, Group E	8th of 11	—N/a	—N/a	—N/a	—N/a	—N/a
1946–47	3	Serie C North, Group E	1st of 15 (Note: 3rd of 3 in Group B of promotion play-offs)	—N/a	—N/a	—N/a	—N/a	—N/a
1947–48	3	Serie C North, Group F	2nd of 16	—N/a	—N/a	—N/a	—N/a	—N/a
1948–49	3	Serie C, Group A	11th of 22	—N/a	—N/a	—N/a	—N/a	—N/a
1949–50	3	Serie C, Group A	5th of 22	—N/a	—N/a	—N/a	—N/a	—N/a
1950–51	3	Serie C, Group A	1st of 20	—N/a	—N/a	—N/a	—N/a	—N/a
1951–52	2	Serie B	14th of 20	—N/a	—N/a	—N/a	—N/a	—N/a
1952–53	2	Serie B	4th of 18	—N/a	—N/a	—N/a	—N/a	—N/a
1953–54	2	Serie B	7th of 18	—N/a	—N/a	—N/a	—N/a	—N/a
1954–55	2	Serie B	13th of 18	—N/a	—N/a	—N/a	—N/a	—N/a
1955–56	2	Serie B	3rd of 18	—N/a	—N/a	—N/a	—N/a	—N/a
1956–57	2	Serie B	8th of 18	—N/a	—N/a	—N/a	—N/a	—N/a
1957–58	2	Serie B	4th of 18	GS	—N/a	—N/a	—N/a	—N/a
1958–59	2	Serie B	7th of 20	R16	—N/a	—N/a	—N/a	—N/a
1959–60	2	Serie B	16th of 20	R1	—N/a	—N/a	—N/a	—N/a
1960–61	2	Serie B	5th of 20	R1	—N/a	—N/a	—N/a	—N/a
1961–62	2	Serie B	8th of 20	R1	—N/a	—N/a	—N/a	—N/a
1962–63	2	Serie B	9th of 20	R1	—N/a	—N/a	—N/a	—N/a
1963–64	2	Serie B	15th of 20	RInt	—N/a	—N/a	—N/a	—N/a
1964–65	2	Serie B	16th of 20	R3	—N/a	—N/a	—N/a	—N/a
1965–66	2	Serie B	19th of 20	R1	—N/a	—N/a	—N/a	—N/a
1966–67	3	Serie C, Group A	1st of 18 (Note: Promotion play-off match win)		—N/a	—N/a	—N/a	
1967–68	2	Serie B	8th of 21	SBInt	—N/a	—N/a	—N/a	
1968–69	2	Serie B	12th of 20	GS	—N/a	—N/a	—N/a	
1969–70	2	Serie B	5th of 20	GS	—N/a	—N/a	—N/a	
1970–71	2	Serie B	15th of 20	QF	—N/a	—N/a	—N/a	
1971–72	2	Serie B	17th of 20	GS1	—N/a	—N/a	—N/a	
1972–73	2	Serie B	19th of 20	GS1	—N/a		—N/a	
1973–74	3	Serie C, Group A	3rd of 20		—N/a	Winners	—N/a	
1974–75	3	Serie C, Group A	2nd of 20		—N/a	Winners	—N/a	
1975–76	3	Serie C, Group A	1st of 20		—N/a	Runners-up	—N/a	
1976–77	2	Serie B	5th of 20	GS1	—N/a		—N/a	
1977–78	2	Serie B	4th of 20	GS2	—N/a		—N/a	
1978–79	2	Serie B	4th of 20	GS	—N/a		—N/a	
1979–80	2	Serie B	5th of 20	GS	—N/a		—N/a	
1980–81	2	Serie B	20th of 20	GS	—N/a		—N/a	
1981–82	3	Serie C1, Group A	2nd of 18		—N/a	R16	—N/a	
1982–83	2	Serie B	7th of 20	GS	—N/a		—N/a	
1983–84	2	Serie B	13th of 20	GS	—N/a		—N/a	
1984–85	2	Serie B	9th of 20	GS	—N/a		—N/a	
1985–86	2	Serie B	20th of 20	GS	—N/a		—N/a	
1986–87	3	Serie C1, Group A	5th of 18	GS	—N/a	R32	—N/a	
1987–88	3	Serie C1, Group A	2nd of 18	GS	—N/a	Winners	—N/a	
1988–89	2	Serie B	15th of 20	R2			—N/a	
1989–90	2	Serie B	17th of 20 (Note: Relegation play-off match defeat)	PR1			—N/a	
1990–91	3	Serie C1, Group A	7th of 18	R2		Winners	—N/a	
1991–92	3	Serie C1, Group A	2nd of 18	R1		R16	—N/a	
1992–93	2	Serie B	13th of 20	R2			—N/a	
1993–94	2	Serie B	20th of 20	R1			—N/a	
1994–95	3	Serie C1, Group A	4th of 18 (Note: Promotion play-off semi-final defeat)	R2		R3	—N/a	
1995–96	3	Serie C1, Group A	4th of 18	R1		Runners-up	—N/a	
1996–97	3	Serie C1, Group A	5th of 18 (Note: Promotion play-offs win)	R2		R16	—N/a	
1997–98	2	Serie B	16th of 20	R1			—N/a	
1998–99	2	Serie B	15th of 20	R1			—N/a	
1999–2000	2	Serie B	14th of 20	GS			—N/a	
2000–01	2	Serie B	18th of 20	GS				
2001–02	3	Serie C1, Group A	18th of 18	GS		R16		
2002–03	4	Serie C2, Group A	7th of 18			R32		
2003–04	4	Serie C2, Group A	8th of 18			R32		
2004–05	4	Serie C2, Group A	3rd of 18 (Note: Promotion play-off semi-final defeat. Despite not being promoted via play-offs, Monza was later admitted to Serie C1.)			GS		
2005–06	3	Serie C1, Group A	3rd of 18 (Note: Promotion play-off final defeat)	R2		QR16		
2006–07	3	Serie C1, Group A	5th of 18	R2		R16		
2007–08	3	Serie C1, Group A	8th of 18			GS		
2008–09	3	Lega Pro Prima Divisione, Group A	13th of 18	R2		R3		
2009–10	3	Lega Pro Prima Divisione, Group A	10th of 18			R1		
2010–11	3	Lega Pro Prima Divisione, Group A	15th of 18 (Note: Relegation play-off match defeat. Despite being relegated via play-offs, Monza was later re-admitted to Lega Pro Prima Divisione.)	R2		R3		
2011–12	3	Lega Pro Prima Divisione, Group A	17th of 18			GS		
2012–13	4	Lega Pro Seconda Divisione, Group A	5th of 18			GS		
2013–14	4	Lega Pro Seconda Divisione, Group A	4th of 18	R2		Runners-up		
2014–15	3	Lega Pro, Group A	15th of 20 (Note: Relegation play-off match win. Despite not being relegated via play-offs, Monza was later declared bankrupt and was forced to start over from Serie D.)	R2		R32		
2015–16	4	Serie D, Group B	10th of 20					R1
2016–17	4	Serie D, Group B	1st of 18 (Note: Scudetto Serie D winner)					R1
2017–18	3	Serie C, Group A	4th of 19 (Note: Promotion play-off second round defeat)			R1		
2018–19	3	Serie C, Group B	5th of 20 (Note: Promotion play-off quarter-finals defeat)	R2		Runners-up		
2019–20	3	Serie C, Group A	1st of 20	R3		R32	cancelled (Note: Cancelled due to the outbreak of COVID-19 pandemic in Italy)	
2020–21	2	Serie B	3rd of 20	R4				
2021–22	2	Serie B	4th of 20	R64				
2022–23	1	Serie A	11th of 20	R16				
2023–24	1	Serie A	12th of 20	R64				
2024–25	1	Serie A	20th of 20	R16				
2025–26	2	Serie B	3rd of 20	R1				
2026–27	1	Serie A	ongoing	ongoing				

== League participations ==
Tier	League	Appearances	First season	Last season	Total
1	Serie A	4	2022–23	2026–27	4
2	Seconda Divisione	4	1922–23	1925–26	47
2	Prima Divisione	2	1927–28	1928–29	47
2	Serie B	41	1951–52	2025–26	47
3	Seconda Divisione	1	1926–27		44
3	Prima Divisione	6	1929–30	1934–35	44
3	Serie C	20	1935–36	2019–20	44
3	Serie C1	16	1981–82	2011–12	44
3	Lega Pro	1	2014–15		44
4	Prima Divisione	1	1941–42		8
4	Serie C2	5	2002–03	2013–14	8
4	Serie D	2	2015–16	2016–17	8
