= Supercoppa di Serie C =

- Founded: 2000
- Region: Italy
- Teams: 2 (2000–14); 3 (2015–present)
- Current champions: Benevento (1st title)
- Most championships: Modena, Novara, Spezia (2 titles each)

The Supercoppa di Serie C (Supercoppa Serie C), formerly named Supercoppa di Lega Pro, is an Italian football competition played by the three group winners of Serie C. The competition was inaugurated in 2000.

== Forerunners ==
The FIGC introduced a third-level national football championship for the first time following the reforms of 1926. The Direttorio Divisioni Inferiori Nord, the fascist authority ruling the second division in Northern Italy, introduced a national cup for the group winners.

- 1926–27: AC Monza
- 1927–28: Edera Trieste

In 1928 the fascists decided to allow the fully national Direttorio Divisioni Superiori to organize the third-level championship instead. A cup for the group winners, and promotion to newly-born Serie B was maintained.

- 1928–29: Spezia Calcio
- 1929–30: Udinese

However, Italian tifosi showed very little interest for this honorific cup, so it was discontinued for seventy years.

== Winners ==
Season	Home team	Score	Away team	Venue
2000	Crotone	1–1	Siena	Stadio Ezio Scida, Crotone
2000	Siena	1–0	Crotone	Stadio Artemio Franchi, Siena
2000	Siena (group A) won 2–1 on aggregate			
2001	Palermo	0–2 (judge decision)	Modena	Stadio Renzo Barbera, Palermo
2001	Modena	3–0	Palermo	Stadio Alberto Braglia, Modena
2001	Modena (group A) won 5–0 on aggregate			
2002	Ascoli	1–0	Livorno	Stadio Del Duca, Ascoli Piceno
2002	Livorno	2–1	Ascoli	Stadio Armando Picchi, Livorno
2002	Ascoli (group B) won on away goals rule, aggregate tied 2–2			
2003	Treviso	0–2	Avellino	Stadio Omobono Tenni, Treviso
2003	Avellino	0–2	Treviso	Stadio Partenio, Avellino
2003	Treviso (group A) won 9–8 on penalties, aggregate tied 2–2			
2004	Arezzo	3–0	Catanzaro	Stadio Comunale, Arezzo
2004	Catanzaro	0–1	Arezzo	Stadio Nicola Ceravolo, Catanzaro
2004	Arezzo (group A) won 4–0 on aggregate			
2005	Rimini	5–2	Cremonese	Stadio Romeo Neri, Rimini
2005	Cremonese	2–4	Rimini	Stadio Giovanni Zini, Cremona
2005	Rimini (group B) won 9–4 on aggregate			
2006	Spezia	0–0	Napoli	Stadio Alberto Picco, La Spezia
2006	Napoli	1–1	Spezia	Stadio San Paolo, Naples
2006	Spezia (group A) won on away goals rule, aggregate tied 1–1			
2007	Ravenna	1–1	Grosseto	Stadio Bruno Benelli, Ravenna
2007	Grosseto	1–0	Ravenna	Stadio Carlo Zecchini, Grosseto
2007	Grosseto (group A) won 2–1 on aggregate			
2008	Sassuolo	0–1	Salernitana	Stadio Enzo Ricci, Sassuolo
2008	Salernitana	0–1	Sassuolo	Stadio Arechi, Salerno
2008	Sassuolo (group A) won 5-4 on penalties, aggregate tied 1–1			
2009	Gallipoli	0–0	Cesena	Stadio Antonio Bianco, Gallipoli
2009	Cesena	1–2	Gallipoli	Dino Manuzzi, Cesena
2009	Gallipoli (group B) won 2–1 on aggregate			
2010	Portogruaro	1–3	Novara	Piergiovanni Mecchia, Portogruaro
2010	Novara	2–3	Portogruaro	Silvio Piola, Novara
2010	Novara (group A) won 5–4 on aggregate			
2011	Gubbio	1–1	Nocerina	Stadio Pietro Barbetti, Gubbio
2011	Nocerina	1–0	Gubbio	Stadio San Francesco, Nocera Inferiore
2011	Nocerina (group B) won 2–1 on aggregate			
2012	Ternana	0–0	Spezia	Stadio Libero Liberati, Terni
2012	Spezia	2–1	Ternana	Stadio Alberto Picco, La Spezia
2012	Spezia (group B) won 2–1 on aggregate			
2013	Avellino	1–1	Trapani	Stadio Partenio-Adriano Lombardi, Avellino
2013	Trapani	2–2	Avellino	Stadio Polisportivo Provinciale, Erice
2013	Avellino (group B) won on away goals rule, aggregate tied 3–3			
2014	Virtus Entella	1–1	Perugia	Stadio Comunale, Chiavari
2014	Perugia	3–1	Virtus Entella	Stadio Renato Curi, Perugia
2014	Perugia (group B) won 4–2 on aggregate			
2015	Novara	3–2	Salernitana	Stadio Silvio Piola, Novara
2015	Salernitana	1–1	Teramo	Stadio Arechi, Salerno
2015	Novara	1–1	Teramo	Stadio Gaetano Bonolis, Teramo
2015	Novara (group A) won with 4 points at the top of the group			
2016	SPAL	4–1	Benevento	Stadio Paolo Mazza, Ferrara
2016	Benevento	2–4	Cittadella	Stadio Ciro Vigorito, Benevento
2016	Cittadella	1–3	SPAL	Stadio Pier Cesare Tombolato, Cittadella
2016	SPAL (group B) won with 6 points at the top of the group			
2017	Cremonese	1–2	Venezia	Stadio Giovanni Zini, Cremona
2017	Foggia	3–1	Cremonese	Stadio Pino Zaccheria, Foggia
2017	Venezia	2–4	Foggia	Stadio Pier Luigi Penzo, Venice
2017	Foggia (group B) won with 6 points at the top of the group			
2018	Padova	5–1	Livorno	Stadio Euganeo, Padua
2018	Lecce	3–1	Livorno	Stadio Armando Picchi, Livorno
2018	Lecce	0–1	Padova	Stadio Via del Mare, Lecce
2018	Padova (group B) won with 6 points at the top of the group			
2019	Virtus Entella	0–0	Pordenone	Stadio Comunale, Chiavari
2019	Juve Stabia	2–2	Virtus Entella	Stadio Romeo Menti, Castellammare di Stabia
2019	Pordenone	3–0	Juve Stabia	Stadio Ottavio Bottecchia, Pordenone
2019	Pordenone (group B) won with 4 points at the top of the group			
2020	Monza (group A)			
2020	Vicenza (group B)			
2020	Reggina (group C)			
2020	Cancelled due to the outbreak of COVID-19 pandemic in Italy			
2021	Perugia	2–1	Como	Stadio Renato Curi, Perugia
2021	Como	0–3	Ternana	Stadio Giuseppe Sinigaglia, Como
2021	Ternana	1–0	Perugia	Stadio Libero Liberati, Terni
2021	Ternana (group C) won with 6 points at the top of the group			
2022	Bari	1–2	Südtirol	Stadio San Nicola, Bari
2022	Modena	3–3	Bari	Stadio Alberto Braglia, Modena
2022	Südtirol	0–2	Modena	Stadio Druso, Bolzano
2022	Modena (group B) won with 4 points at the top of the group			
2023	Catanzaro	2–1	Feralpisalò	Stadio Nicola Ceravolo, Catanzaro
2023	Feralpisalò	3–1	Reggiana	Stadio Lino Turina, Salò
2023	Reggiana	2–2	Catanzaro	Mapei Stadium – Città del Tricolore, Reggio Emilia
2023	Catanzaro (group C) won with 4 points at the top of the group			
2024	Mantova	1–2	Cesena	Stadio Danilo Martelli, Mantua
2024	Juve Stabia	1–4	Mantova	Stadio Romeo Menti, Castellammare di Stabia
2024	Cesena	2–2	Juve Stabia	Stadio Dino Manuzzi, Cesena
2024	Cesena (group B) won with 4 points at the top of the group			
2025	Avellino	0–1	Padova	Stadio Partenio, Avellino
2025	Virtus Entella	1–1	Avellino	Stadio Sannazzari, Chiavari
2025	Padova	0–1	Virtus Entella	Stadio Euganeo, Padua
2025	Entella (group B) won with 4 points at the top of the group			
2026	Arezzo	2–5	Vicenza	Stadio Città di Arezzo, Arezzo
2026	Benevento	1–0	Arezzo	Stadio Ciro Vigorito, Benevento
2026	Vicenza	1–4	Benevento	Stadio Romeo Menti, Vicenza
2026	Benevento (group C) won with 6 points at the top of the group			

== See also ==
- Lega Pro Prima Divisione
- Supercoppa di Lega di Seconda Divisione
- Football in Italy
