= 1921–22 Italian Football Championship =

In the 1921–22 season two concurrent football championships were organized:

- Italian Football Championship 1921-22 (F.I.G.C.)
- Italian Football Championship 1921-22 (C.C.I.)
