= 1921–22 Prima Divisione =

22nd Italian Football Championship

Prima Divisione
- Season: 1921–22 (CCI)
- Champions: Pro Vercelli; 7th title
- Relegated: Vicenza; Venezia

The 1921-22 Prima Divisione was the equal twenty-first edition of the Italian Football Championship. In a highly political season of Italian football, to rival the Federazione Italiana Giuoco Calcio (FIGC) organised 1921-22 Prima Categoria, Italy's richest clubs created the Prima Divisione. The rivalry lasted only this one season. Afterwards, the FIGC recognised the Prima Divisione format as the official championship. Hence, 1921-22 was the last season in which the Prima Categoria winners were awarded Italian Football Champions. The winners of each of the 1921-22 Prima Categoria and Prima Divisione are both officially recognised as Italian Champions that season. The 1921-22 Prima Divisione was the seventh and most recent Italian Football Championship won by Pro Vercelli.

== Regulation ==
During the summer of 1921, Italy's most powerful clubs asked the Federazione Italiana Giuoco Calcio (FIGC) to reduce the number of clubs in Prima Categoria. Vittorio Pozzo developed a plan to accommodate the request. However, smaller clubs fearing they would disappear if such a reduction was passed, voted against Pozzo's plan and causing the plan to be rejected. That led to the creation of a rival new Italian football federation, the Confederazione Calcistica Italiana (CCI). The CCI organised the Prima Divisione that ran concurrent to the FIGC championship.

This rivalry only lasted one season. The following summer FIGC accepted a reduction in the number league participants. Subsequently the FGCI recognised the 1921-22 CCI championship as an official title, alongside the 1921–22 Prima Categoria. Prima Divisione was accepted as the new format from the summer of 1922 onwards, lasting until 1926. 1921-22 was the last season in which the Prima Categoria winners were awarded Italian Football Champions.

== Northern League ==
As a private league, the Northern League was composed by the 24 richest clubs of 1920–21 Prima Categoria.

=== Regular season ===
Group winners went to the final. Under original regulations, bottom clubs went to a salvation play-off against the two best clubs of the Second Division.

==== Group A ====
===== Classification =====
P	Team	Pld	W	D	L	GF	GA	GD	Pts	Qualifications
1.	Pro Vercelli	22	17	2	3	61	14	+47	36	Qualified
2.	Novara	22	12	6	4	47	19	+28	32	
3.	Bologna	22	11	5	6	44	22	+22	27	
4.	Mantova	22	11	2	9	40	34	+6	24	
5.	Andrea Doria	22	11	1	10	36	32	+4	23	
6.	Juventus	22	7	8	7	27	32	-5	22	
6.	Hellas Verona	22	10	2	10	29	36	-7	22	
8.	US Milanese	22	6	8	8	24	29	-5	20	
9.	Milan	22	7	4	11	29	36	-7	18	
10.	Livorno	22	8	3	11	23	41	-18	17	Play-offs won
11.	Spezia	22	5	6	11	21	31	-10	16	Play-offs won
12.	Vicenza (R)	22	2	3	17	18	73	-55	7	Preliminary play-off lost

===== Results table =====
Home \ Away	ADO	BOL	HEL	JUV	LIV	MAN	MIL	NOV	PRO	SPE	USM	VIC
Andrea Doria	—	1–2	5–2	6–2	3–1	4–2	1–2	1–2	1–0	1–0	1–0	3–0
Bologna	0–1	—	4–1	1–1	5–0	2–0	4–0	2–1	2–1	2–0	1–1	11–1
Hellas Verona	2–0	0–2	—	1–2	3–0	2–1	2–1	0–4	0–1	3–2	2–1	3–1
Juventus	2–0	1–1	2–0	—	3–1	1–2	0–0	0–1	1–7	2–2	1–2	1–0
Livorno	3–1	2–0	1–0	0–0	—	1–5	3–2	0–2	1–2	0–0	1–1	2–1
Mantova	1–0	1–0	3–0	0–1	2–1	—	2–1	2–2	1–2	4–0	0–2	6–2
Milan	0–0	2–1	0–1	1–3	1–2	2–2	—	0–5	1–0	0–1	2–0	7–0
Novara	4–0	1–1	2–2	2–1	1–0	3–1	3–2	—	0–1	1–0	1–1	4–2
Pro Vercelli	3–0	4–0	3–2	1–1	5–1	5–0	5–0	1–0	—	1–0	3–0	10–0
Spezia	2–0	1–0	1–2	1–1	1–0	3–2	1–2	0–0	1–3	—	1–1	1–2
US Milanese	2–4	1–1	0–0	2–0	2–1	0–2	0–0	2–2	1–2	2–1	—	2–1
Vicenza	0–3	1–2	0–1	1–1	1–2	0–1	0–3	0–6	1–1	2–2	2–1	—

Legend: Blue = home team win; Yellow = draw; Red = away team win.

==== Group B ====
===== Classification =====
P	Team	Pld	W	D	L	GF	GA	GD	Pts	Qualifications
1.	Genoa	22	16	5	1	61	13	+48	37	Qualified
2.	Alessandria	22	9	10	3	41	24	+17	28	
3.	Pisa	22	12	3	7	53	28	+27	27	
4.	Modena	22	12	2	8	34	33	+1	26	
5.	Padova	22	10	3	9	30	36	-6	23	
6.	Casale	22	7	6	9	33	27	+6	20	
6.	Legnano	22	7	6	9	28	29	-1	20	
6.	Savona	22	9	2	11	28	33	-5	20	
6.	Torino	22	6	8	8	21	29	-8	20	
10.	Venezia (R)	22	7	3	12	19	45	-36	17	Extra play-off lost
11.	Brescia	22	6	3	13	19	33	-14	15	Play-offs won
12.	Internazionale	22	3	5	14	29	66	-37	11	Play-offs won

===== Results table =====
Home \ Away	ALE	BRE	CAS	GEN	INT	LEG	MOD	PAD	PIS	SAV	TOR	VEN
Alessandria	—	2–2	1–1	1–1	5–0	3–1	1–0	3–1	3–0	3–0	2–0	5–2
Brescia	0–1	—	4–0	0–1	3–1	1–1	1–0	1–0	0–2	3–0	1–0	0–3
Casale	0–0	4–0	—	3–2	7–0	0–1	6–0	0–1	0–0	2–1	1–1	3–0
Genoa	2–2	1–0	5–0	—	2–0	2–0	7–0	7–1	2–0	2–0	2–0	7–0
Internazionale	2–2	4–3	1–3	1–4	—	2–2	1–2	3–4	2–2	2–0	0–1	2–0
Legnano	0–0	0–0	1–0	1–3	6–0	—	0–0	3–1	4–2	2–1	1–1	3–0
Modena	2–0	1–0	2–1	1–1	5–1	2–0	—	2–1	2–1	2–0	3–0	4–1
Padova	3–1	2–0	1–1	0–1	2–2	2–1	2–1	—	2–1	3–1	1–1	1–0
Pisa	3–2	5–0	2–0	1–1	7–2	4–0	4–1	3–1	—	4–0	4–1	5–0
Savona	1–1	2–0	2–0	1–1	3–1	2–1	2–0	2–0	3–1	—	3–1	3–0
Torino	1–1	1–0	1–1	0–2	2–2	2–0	3–2	2–0	0–2	2–0	—	1–1
Venezia	2–2	2–0	1–0	1–5	1–0	1–0	0–2	0–1	2–0	2–1	0–0	—

Legend: Blue = home team win; Yellow = draw; Red = away team win.

=== Finals ===
Played on May 7 and 14, 1922.

Team 1	Agg.	Team 2	1st leg	2nd leg
Pro Vercelli	2-1	Genoa	0–0	2–1

== Southern League ==
The Southern League was a separate amatorial league, still divided in five regions. The winner were Fortitudo Rome.

== National Finals ==
Played on June 11 and 18, 1922.

Team 1	Agg.	Team 2	1st leg	2nd leg
Fortitudo Roma	2-8	Pro Vercelli	0-3	2-5

== Play-offs ==
=== Preliminary play-offs ===
Played on July 2, 1922.

Team 1	Score	Team 2
Derthona	3-1(*)	Vicenza

(*) This match was invalidated due to a referee's technical error. The match was repeated a week later:

Played on July 9, 1922, in Legnano.

Team 1	Score	Team 2
Derthona	4-0	Vicenza

Vicenza were relegated to 1922–23 Seconda Divisione.

Internazionale received a walkover as their opponents Sport Club Nazionale Lombardia went bankrupt and disbanded.

=== Barrage play-offs ===
The CCI was very rich but it suffered the lack of international recognition by the FIFA, so an agreement with the FIGC was found. On July 9 and 16, Inter and Derthona and the other four bottom clubs of the Northern League were challenged by six FIGC’s clubs.

Venezia was the sole CCI club to be relegated to the 1922–23 Seconda Divisione following the defeat by FIGC’s Rivarolese. Spezia was re-elected when CCI’s Livorno bought and merged with its FIGC's counterpart Pro Livorno, freeing a slot.

Team 1	Agg.	Team 2	1st leg	2nd leg
Brescia	X (*)	Sestrese	2-0	0-5
Internazionale	4-1	Libertas Firenze	3-0	1-1
Piacenza	1-6	Livorno	1-4	0-2
Rivarolese	2-1	Venezia	0-0	2-1
Spezia	2-3	Pastore Torino	1-1	1-2
Treviso	0-2	Derthona	0-1	0-1

(*) Since the away goal rule wasn't applied, a tie-break was needed:

Played on July 23, 1922, in Piacenza.

Team 1	Score	Team 2
Brescia	2-0	Sestrese

=== Extra play-offs ===
After U.S. Livorno and Pro Livorno's merger, a spot in the Prima Divisione was freed and extra-rounds had to be organized.

==== Extra Round 1 ====
Played on September 17, 1922.

Team 1	Score	Team 2
Sestrese	1-0	Venezia
Spezia	3-0	Treviso

==== Extra Round 2 ====
Played on September 24, 1922, in Reggio Emilia.

Team 1	Score	Team 2
Sestrese	1-2	Spezia

== References and sources ==
- Almanacco Illustrato del Calcio - La Storia 1898-2004, Panini Edizioni, Modena, September 2005
