= Marcora =

Marcora is an Italian surname. Notable people with the surname include:

- Attilio Marcora (1899–1979), Italian footballer
- Carlos Marcora (born 1976), Uruguayan footballer
- Giovanni Marcora (1922–1983), Italian businessman and politician
- Roberto Marcora (born 1989), Italian tennis player
