= USD Novese =

Italian football club

Novese
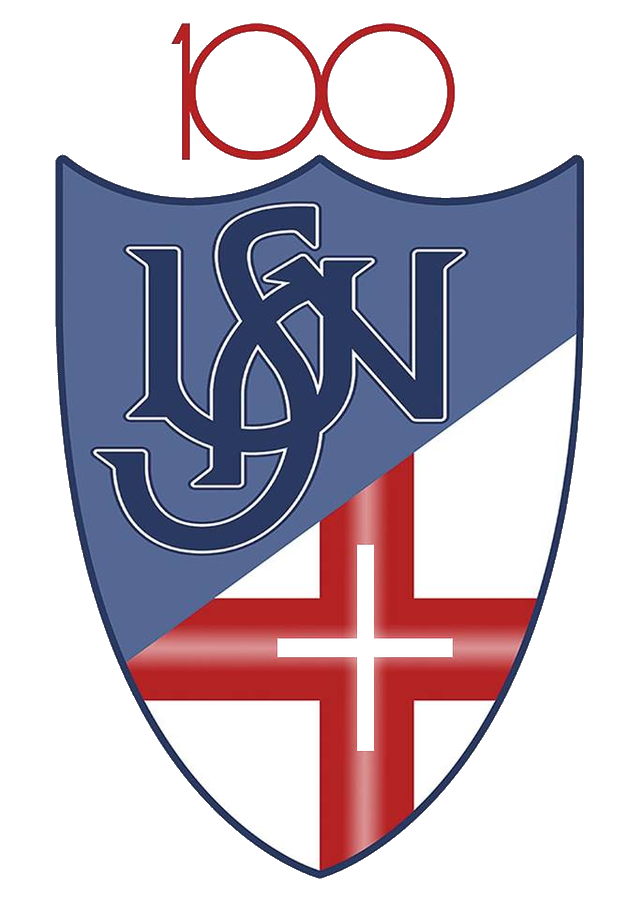
- Full name: Associazione Sportiva Dilettantistica Novese
- Founded: 1919
- Ground: Stadio Costante Girardengo, Novi Ligure
- Capacity: 3,500
- Chairman: Arturo Frattoni
- Manager: Arturo Merlo
- League: Promozione Piedmont-Aosta Valley (Girone D)
- 2025-26 Promozione: 11th of 16
- Website: http://www.novesecalcio.it/
Home colours	Away colours

Unione Sportiva Dilettantistica Novese is an Italian football club from Novi Ligure, Piedmont which plays in the Promozione Piedmont-Aosta Valley (Girone D), the sixth tier of Italian football. The club is best known for winning the 1921–22 Italian Football Championship.

Novese is the only Italian football team that has won a scudetto without playing a single season in Serie A or Serie B.

== History ==
Novese was founded in 1919 and entered Italian football history by winning the F.I.G.C. 1921–22 Italian Football Championship, a season when there were two cocurrent national leagues in Italian football: the Federazione Italiana Giuoco Calcio (FIGC) and the breakaway Confederazione Calcistica Italiana (CCI), who organised the 1921–22 Prima Divisione, which included the major clubs of Northern Italy at the time.

== Colors and badge ==
The team colors are white and light blue.

== Honours ==
=== Domestic competitions ===
- Italian Football Championship

Winners (1): 1921–22

=== Regional competitions ===
- Promozione

Winners (2): 1920–21, 1953–54

- Prima Divisione

Winners (2): 1941–42, 1951–52

- Eccellenza Piemonte-Valle d'Aosta

Winners (2): 1997–98, 2003–04

- Coppa Italia Dilettanti Piemonte-Valle d'Aosta

Winners (1): 2006–07

- Supercoppa Piemonte-Valle d'Aosta

Winners (1): 2003–04

== See also ==
- Association football league system in Italy
