= 1925–26 Seconda Divisione =

Italian football league season

Seconda Divisione
- Season: 1925–26
- Relegated: Juve Italia; Lecco; Fanfulla; Monza; Corniglianese; Valenzana; Vado; Piacenza; Crema; Gonzaga; Viareggio; Pro Gorizia; Eders Trieste; Trevigliese; Vicenza; Dolo; Petrarca; Vercellesi Erranti (bankruptcy); FIAT (bankruptcy); Novese (bankruptcy); Olympia (disbanded)

Seconda Divisione 1925–26 was the lower championship of the Lega Nord.

Different from the higher championship, it was structured on four local groups.

== Regulations ==
It had four groups of eleven clubs, twenty-two match days.

Under Lega Nord's reform project, four clubs in each group would pass to a new intermediate championship, while subsequent four clubs would remain in this tournament.

After the fascist takeover of the CONI and the FIGC in summer 1926, regulations changed at the end of the championship. Lega Nord was transformed into an appointed fascist committee, the Direttorio Divisioni Superiori. Six clubs in each group remained in the lower DDS championship, while to give space to Southern teams, the last five clubs were relegated.

== Group A ==
- Biellese 29
- Derthona 28
- Atalanta 26
- Pro Patria 26
- US Milanese 23
- Como 20
- Juve Italia 19
- Lecco 16
- Fanfulla 15
- Monza 12
- Vercellesi Erranti 6

Juve Italia, Lecco, Fanfulla and Monza relegated. Vercellesi Erranti went bankrupt and disbanded.

== Group B ==
- Spezia 26
- Speranza 25
- Sestrese 25
- Astigiani 23
- Savona 22
- FIAT 22
- Corniglianese 21
- Valenzana 20
- Rivarolese 16
- Vado 13
- Novese 7

Corniglianese, Valenzana, Rivarolese and Vado relegated. FIAT and Novese went bankrupt and disbanded.

== Group C ==
- Spal 33
- Lucchese 26
- Prato 25
- Libertas 25
- Pistoiese 25
- Carpi 18
- Piacenza 17
- Crema 16
- Gonzaga 15
- Viareggio 11
- Trevigliese 8

Piacenza, Crema, Gonzaga, Viareggio and Trevigliese relegated.

== Group D ==
- Venezia 27
- Treviso 25
- Olympia Fiume 23
- Gloria Fiume 23
- Monfalcone 20
- Triestina 18
- Pro Gorizia 18
- Edera 18
- Vicenza 18
- Dolo 17
- Petrarca 13

Pro Gorizia, Edera, Vicenza, Dolo and Petrarca relegated. Olympia Fiume and Gloria Fiume merged becoming US Fiumana.
