= 1921–22 Prima Categoria =

21st season of top-tier Italian football

Prima Categoria
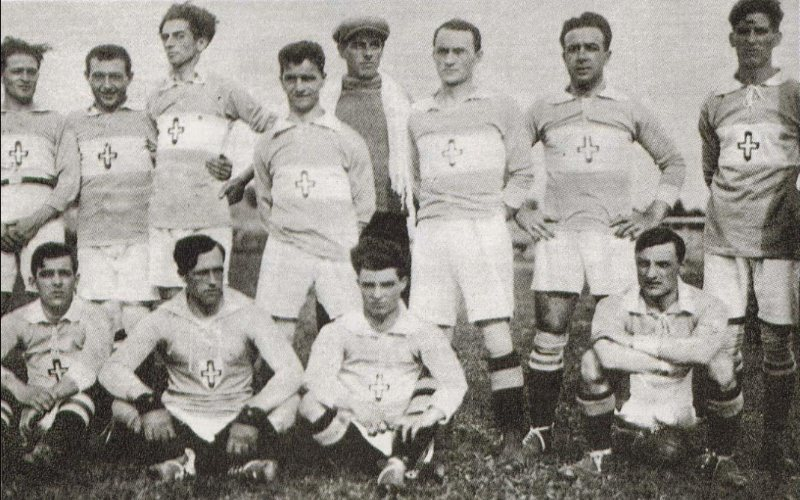
- 1921–22 Novese team
- Season: 1921–22
- Champions: Novese; 1st title

The 1921–22 Prima Categoria was the equal twenty-first edition of the Italian Football Championship and the fifteenth since the re-brand to Prima Categoria. In a highly political season of Italian football, to rival the Federazione Italiana Giuoco Calcio (FIGC) organised Prima Categoria, Italy's richest clubs organised the 1921–22 Prima Divisione. The rivalry lasted only this one season. Afterwards, the FIGC recognised the Prima Divisione format as the official championship from 1922 onwards. Hence, 1921–22 was the last season in which the Prima Categoria winners were awarded Italian Football Champions. The winners of each of the 1921–22 Prima Categoria and Prima Divisione are both officially recognised as Italian Champions that season. The 1921–22 Prima Categoria is the only Italian Football Championship won to date by Novese.

== Formation of Prima Divisione and downfall of Prima Categoria ==
During the summer of 1921, Italy's most powerful clubs asked the Federazione Italiana Giuoco Calcio (FIGC) to reduce the number of clubs in Prima Categoria. Vittorio Pozzo developed a plan to accommodate the request. However, smaller clubs fearing they would disappear if such a reduction was passed, voted against Pozzo's plan and causing the plan to be rejected. That led to the creation of a rival new Italian football federation, the Confederazione Calcistica Italiana (CCI). The CCI organised the 1921–22 Prima Divisione that ran concurrent to the FIGC championship.

This rivalry only lasted one season. The following summer the FIGC accepted a reduction in the number league participants. Subsequently the FGCI recognised the 1921–22 CCI championship as an official title, alongside the 1921–22 Prima Categoria. Prima Divisione was accepted as the new format from the summer of 1922 onwards, lasting until 1926. Hence, 1921-22 was the last season in which the Prima Categoria winners were awarded Italian Football Champions. The winners of each of the 1921–22 Prima Categoria and Prima Divisione are both officially recognised as Italian Champions that season.

== Regulation ==
Tuscany was added to the main championship as the sixth region. The regional FAs remained with 48 clubs. The preliminary regional phase was the bulk of the tournament, with even twelve matchdays and regular regional football champions, while the following national phase was reduced to a spring tournament of two little groups and a final.

The main tournament was completely divided in six independent sections, and each region had its own football champions that joined the national championship.

== Teams ==
Consequently to the controversy with the secessionist clubs, the Regional FAs quite respected the promotion rules. Only two clubs were added to the six rightful winners of the lower secondary regional tournaments.

== Qualifications ==
=== Piedmont ===
==== Classification ====
P	Team	Pld	W	D	L	GF	GA	GD	Pts	Promotion or relegation
1.	Novese	8	6	2	0	18	1	+17	14	Qualified
2.	US Torinese	8	3	3	2	7	9	-2	9	
3.	Pastore Torino	8	2	4	2	7	10	-3	8	Later to playoffs
4.	Valenzana	8	2	1	5	8	12	-4	5	Later to playoffs
5.	GC Cappuccini (E)	8	1	2	5	6	14	-8	4	Merged with Pro Vercelli
6.	Biellese	-							-	Retired

==== Results table ====
Home \ Away	GCC	NOV	PAS	UST	VAL
GC Cappuccini Vercelli	—	0–2	2–2	1–1	2–0
Novese	2–0	—	4–0	2–0	1–0
Pastore Torino	1–0	0–0	—	0–0	3–2
US Torinese	3–0	0–6	0–0	—	2–0
Valenzana	3–1	1–1	2–1	0–1	—

Legend: Blue = home team win; Yellow = draw; Red = away team win.

=== Liguria ===
==== Classification ====
P	Team	Pld	W	D	L	GF	GA	GD	Pts	Promotion or relegation
1.	Sampierdarenese	10	8	2	0	25	7	+18	18	Qualified
2.	Speranza Savona	10	5	2	3	17	17	0	12	
3.	Rivarolese	10	4	2	4	13	13	0	10	Later to playoffs
4.	Sestrese	10	3	2	5	17	13	+4	8	Later to playoffs
5.	SPES Genova	10	3	1	6	11	20	-9	7	Later to Div2
6.	GC Genova	10	2	1	7	9	22	-13	5	Later to Div2

==== Results table ====
Home \ Away	GCG	RIV	SAM	SES	SSA	SGE
GC Genova	—	0–2	1–4	0–5	1–2	3–0
Rivarolese	1–0	—	2–2	0–0	1–2	2–0
Sampierdarenese	5–1	3–1	—	1–0	2–0	2–1
Sestrese	0–1	1–2	1–4	—	5–0	2–4
Speranza Savona	2–1	4–2	0–0	1–1	—	3–0
SPES Genova	1–1	1–0	0–2	0–2	4–3	—

Legend: Blue = home team win; Yellow = draw; Red = away team win.

=== Lombardy ===
==== Group A ====
Classification

P	Team	Pld	W	D	L	GF	GA	GD	Pts	Promotion or relegation
1.	Como	6	4	1	1	20	8	+12	9	Qualified
2.	Chiasso	6	2	4	0	11	5	+6	8	Later to Div2
3.	Saronno	6	2	2	2	7	8	-1	6	Later to Div2
4.	Varese	6	0	1	5	7	24	-17	1	Later to Div2

Results table

Home \ Away	CHI	COM	SAR	VAR
Chiasso	—	2–0	0–0	4–0
Como	2–2	—	4–1	7–2
Saronno	1–1	0–1	—	4–2
Varese	2–2	1–6	0–1	—

Legend: Blue = home team win; Yellow = draw; Red = away team win.

==== Group B ====
Classification

P	Team	Pld	W	D	L	GF	GA	GD	Pts	Promotion or relegation
1.	Cremonese	6	4	2	0	18	4	+14	10	Qualified
2.	Trevigliese	6	3	1	2	9	10	-1	7	Later to Div2
3.	Atalanta	6	3	0	3	9	14	-5	6	Later to Div2
4.	Stelvio (E)	6	0	1	5	5	13	-8	1	Disbanded

Results table

Home \ Away	ATA	CRE	STE	TRE
Atalanta	—	1–2	3–2	3–2
Cremonese	7–0	—	1–1	5–2
Stelvio	0–2	0–3	—	1–2
Trevigliese	1–0	0–0	2–1	—

Legend: Blue = home team win; Yellow = draw; Red = away team win.

==== Group C ====
Classification

P	Team	Pld	W	D	L	GF	GA	GD	Pts	Promotion or relegation
1.	Enotria Goliardo	6	4	2	0	12	7	+5	10	Qualified
2.	Monza	6	2	1	3	10	11	-1	5	Later to Div2
2.	Juventus Italia	6	2	1	3	9	12	-3	5	Later to Div2
4.	Casteggio	6	2	0	4	8	9	-1	4	Later to Div2

Results table

Home \ Away	CAS	ENO	JUV	MON
Casteggio	—	0–2	1–0	4–1
Enotria Goliardo	3–2	—	1–0	1–1
Juventus Italia	2–1	3–3	—	1–0
Monza	1–0	1–2	6–3	—

Legend: Blue = home team win; Yellow = draw; Red = away team win.

==== Group D ====
Classification

P	Team	Pld	W	D	L	GF	GA	GD	Pts	Promotion or relegation
1.	Esperia Como	6	3	1	2	8	4	+4	7	Qualified
2.	Pavia	6	2	2	2	6	6	0	6	Later to Div2
2.	Pro Patria et Libertate	6	2	2	2	5	7	-2	6	Later to Div2
4.	A.C. Libertas (E)	6	2	1	3	5	7	-2	5	Disbanded

Results table

Home \ Away	ESP	LIB	PAV	PRO
Esperia Como	—	1–0	2–0	4–1
A.C. Libertas	2–1	—	1–1	0–2
Pavia	1–0	1–2	—	2–0
Pro Patria et Libertate	0–0	1–0	1–1	—

Legend: Blue = home team win; Yellow = draw; Red = away team win.

==== Final round ====
Classification

P	Team	Pld	W	D	L	GF	GA	GD	Pts	Promotion or relegation
1.	Esperia Como	6	4	1	1	11	6	+5	9	Qualified
2.	Cremonese	6	3	0	3	12	9	+3	6	
3.	Como	6	2	1	3	7	8	-1	5	Later to playoffs
4.	Enotria Goliardo (E)	6	2	0	4	6	13	-7	4	Disbanded

Results table

Home \ Away	COM	CRE	ENO	ESP
Como	—	2–0	4–1	0–3
Cremonese	2–0	—	3–0	6–3
Enotria Goliardo	2–1	3–1	—	0–2
Esperia Como	0–0	1–0	2–0	—

Legend: Blue = home team win; Yellow = draw; Red = away team win.

=== Veneto ===
==== Classification ====
P	Team	Pld	W	D	L	GF	GA	GD	Pts	Promotion or relegation
1.	Petrarca Padova	10	6	2	2	19	14	+5	14	Qualified
2.	Udinese	10	4	4	2	17	8	+11	12	
3.	Bentegodi Verona	10	3	3	4	24	17	+7	9	Later to playoffs
3.	Treviso	10	3	3	4	10	19	-9	9	Later to playoffs
5.	Legnaghese	10	2	4	4	11	15	-4	8	Later to Div2
6.	Schio	10	2	4	4	12	20	-8	8	Later to Div2

==== Results table ====
Home \ Away	BEN	LEG	PET	SCH	TRE	UDI
Bentegodi Verona	—	1–2	1–1	3–1	8–1	0–3
Legnaghese	3–2	—	1–2	2–2	1–2	0–0
Petrarca Padova	3–2	2–0	—	5–2	2–0	2–1
Schio	0–4	1–1	2–1	—	2–1	1–1
Treviso	1–1	1–1	0–0	2–1	—	2–1
Udinese	2–2	2–0	5–1	0–0	2–0	—

Legend: Blue = home team win; Yellow = draw; Red = away team win.

=== Emilia ===
==== Group A ====
Classification

P	Team	Pld	W	D	L	GF	GA	GD	Pts	Promotion or relegation
1.	Piacenza	4	2	2	0	10	4	+6	6	Qualified
2.	Parma	4	2	1	1	6	4	+2	5	Qualified
3.	US Mantovana	4	0	1	3	3	11	-8	1	Later to Div2

Results table

Home \ Away	PAR	PIA	USM
Parma	—	2–2	2–0
Piacenza	1–0	—	5–0
US Mantovana	1–2	2–2	—

Legend: Blue = home team win; Yellow = draw; Red = away team win.

==== Group B ====
Classification

P	Team	Pld	W	D	L	GF	GA	GD	Pts	Promotion or relegation
1.	Virtus Bologna	6	2	3	1	8	4	+4	7	Qualified
2.	SPAL	6	1	4	1	4	1	+3	6	Qualified
3.	Carpi	6	2	2	2	5	4	+1	6	Later to Div2
4.	Reggiana	6	2	1	3	5	13	-8	5	Later to Div2

Results table

Home \ Away	CAR	REG	SPA	VIR
Carpi	—	3–1	0–0	2–1
Reggiana	1–0	—	1–0	0–4
SPAL	0–0	4–0	—	0–0
Virtus Bologna	1–0	2–2	0–0	—

Legend: Blue = home team win; Yellow = draw; Red = away team win.

Qualification playoff
Played on 8 January 1922.

Team 1	Score	Team 2
SPAL	1-1 a.e.t.	Carpi

Tie-breaker
Played on 15 January 1922 in Bologna.

Team 1	Score	Team 2
SPAL	3–1	Carpi

==== Relegation playoff ====
Played on 22 and 29 January 1922.

Team 1	Agg.	Team 2	1st leg	2nd leg
Reggiana	–	US Mantovana	3–2	2–9

Since the aggregate rule wasn't applied, a tie-breaker was needed.

Tie-breaker
Played on 5 February 1922 in Ferrara.

Team 1	Score	Team 2
Reggiana	2–1 (a.e.t.)	US Mantovana

==== Final round ====
Classification

P	Team	Pld	W	D	L	GF	GA	GD	Pts	Promotion or relegation
1.	SPAL	6	3	3	0	12	5	+7	9	Qualified
2.	Virtus Bologna	6	3	2	1	10	5	+5	8	
3.	Parma	6	1	2	3	8	13	-5	4	Later to playoffs
4.	Piacenza	6	1	1	4	7	14	-7	3	Later to playoffs

Results table

Home \ Away	PAR	PIA	SPA	VIR
Parma	—	4–1	2–2	2–2
Piacenza	3–0	—	2–2	1–2
SPAL	2–0	4–0	—	1–0
Virtus Bologna	3–0	2–0	1–1	—

Legend: Blue = home team win; Yellow = draw; Red = away team win.

=== Tuscany ===
==== Classification ====
P	Team	Pld	W	D	L	GF	GA	GD	Pts	Promotion or relegation
1.	Pro Livorno	10	7	1	2	22	8	+14	15	Qualified
2.	Lucca	10	5	3	2	25	10	+15	13	
3.	Libertas Firenze	10	5	2	3	11	16	-5	12	Later to playoffs
4.	Viareggio	10	5	1	4	18	16	+2	11	Later to playoffs
5.	Prato	10	1	3	6	10	18	-8	5	Later to Div2
6.	CS Firenze	10	1	2	7	6	24	-18	4	Later to Div2

==== Results table ====
Home \ Away	CSF	LIB	LUC	PRA	PRO	VIA
CS Firenze	—	0–1	1–1	2–1	1–1	1–2
Libertas Firenze	2–0	—	0–0	1–1	1–0	2–0
Lucca	8–0	6–0	—	1–0	4–2	2–0
Prato	3–0	0–3	1–1	—	0–2	1–3
Pro Livorno	2–0	6–0	2–0	3–1	—	3–1
Viareggio	3–1	3–1	4–2	2–2	0–1	—

Legend: Blue = home team win; Yellow = draw; Red = away team win.

== Semifinals ==
=== Group A ===
==== Classification ====
P	Team	Pld	W	D	L	GF	GA	GD	Pts	Promotion or relegation
1.	Novese	4	3	1	0	12	4	+8	7	Qualified
2.	Petrarca Padova	4	1	2	1	5	5	0	4	
3.	Pro Livorno (E)	4	0	1	3	3	11	-8	1	Merged with AS Livorno

==== Results table ====
Home \ Away	NOV	PET	PRO
Novese	—	1–1	3–0
Petrarca Padova	1–3	—	1–1
Pro Livorno	2–5	0–2	—

Legend: Blue = home team win; Yellow = draw; Red = away team win.

=== Group B ===
==== Classification ====
P	Team	Pld	W	D	L	GF	GA	GD	Pts	Promotion or relegation
1.	Sampierdarenese	4	2	1	1	4	3	+1	5	Qualified
1.	SPAL	4	2	1	1	8	7	+1	5	
3.	Esperia Como	4	0	2	2	6	8	-2	2	

==== Results table ====
Home \ Away	ESP	SAM	SPA
Esperia Como	—	1–1	2–2
Sampierdarenese	1–0	—	2–0
SPAL	4–3	2–0	—

Legend: Blue = home team win; Yellow = draw; Red = away team win.

==== Qualification playoff ====
Played on April 30, 1922, in Milan.

Team 1	Score	Team 2
Sampierdarenese	2-1	SPAL

== National Finals ==
Played on May 7 and 14, 1922.

Team 1	Agg.	Team 2	1st leg	2nd leg
Sampierdarenese	0-0	Novese	0-0	0-0

Repetition
Played on May 21, 1922, in Cremona.

Team 1	Score	Team 2
Novese	2-1	Sampierdarenese

== Qualifications to Prima Divisione ==
This FIGC was very poor, and risks of a general bankruptcy was real. The FIGC had a sole resource, its FIFA membership, during the talks that started with the Northern League.

The rich League proposed that FIGC’s Prima Categoria became the Second Division of its CCI’s championship. An agreement was found in late June: the Colombo Compromise by the boss of newspaper La Gazzetta dello Sport.

The League imposed its idea of a 24 clubs First Division and a 48 clubs Second Division from 1923. The FIGC obtained a special 36 clubs championship for 1922-23, including champions and runner-ups of the disbanded Regional FAs. More, a third club of each regional FA could test its strength against a League bottom club.

To respect as possible its clubs, the FIGC decided a test-match between the third and the forth clubs of each region. All other clubs went directly to Division Two.

Played on July 2, 1922.

Team 1	Score	Team 2
Pastore Torino	4-0	Viareggio
Como	1-2	Piacenza
Bentegodi Verona	2-7	Sestrese
Rivarolese	2-0	Valenzana
Parma	1-2	Treviso
Libertas Firenze	2-1	Enotria Goliardo

On mid-July Sundays, the six FIGC’s qualification winners could try to match the Northern League’s six bottom clubs.

Home/away matches on July 9 and 16.

Team 1	Agg.	Team 2	1st leg	2nd leg
Brescia	X (*)	Sestrese	2-0	0-5
Internazionale	4-1	Libertas Firenze	3-0	1-1
Piacenza	1-6	Livorno	1-4	0-2
Rivarolese	2-1	Venezia	0-0	2-1
Spezia	2-3	Pastore Torino	1-1	1-2
Treviso	0-2	Derthona	0-1	0-1

(*) Since the away goal rule wasn't applied, a tie-break was needed:

Played on July 23, 1922, in Piacenza.

Team 1	Score	Team 2
Brescia	2-0	Sestrese

Rivarolese and Pastore Turin were the sole two FIGC clubs which joined the regional champions and runners-up in the new First Division.

== References and sources ==
- Almanacco Illustrato del Calcio - La Storia 1898-2004, Panini Edizioni, Modena, September 2005
