= Lega Nazionale Alta Italia =

Former association football organization in Italy

- Lega Nazionale Alta Italia
- Abbreviation: LNAI
- Predecessor: Direttorio Divisioni Superiori
- Successor: Lega Nazionale Professionisti
- Founded: 1945; 81 years ago
- Dissolved: 1946; 80 years ago
- Headquarters: Milan
- Region served: Italy
- Products: Serie A Serie B Serie C Coppa Italia
- Members: 50
- Parent organization: FIGC

Lega Nazionale Alta Italia (English: High Italy National League) was the ruling body of the major association football championships during the U.S. military occupation of Northern Italy.

== History ==
Direttorio Divisioni Superiori, the football committee during the fascist age, was disbanded at the arrival of the U.S. Army in 1945. Railways and routes disruptions, together with the Allied occupation the industrialized North, had divided Italy in two parts. Sport consequently restarted under a special transitional season.

Clubs from Northern Italy restored a free football league after 19 years of fascist rule. It organized the local section of the Serie A, whose best teams would join a final national phase, while the Serie B clubs were united with the best Serie C teams. The league organized also a local post season cup which was won by Bologna. The situation changed a year after the end of World War II. The Lega Nazionale Professionisti was founded in 1946.

== Chairman ==
- 1945–1946: Pietro Pedroni
