= 1923–24 Seconda Divisione =

Italian football league season

Seconda Divisione
- Season: 1923–24
- Champions: Derthona; 2nd title
- Promoted: Derthona; Reggiana; Mantova (wild card)
- Relegated: Varese; Pastore; SPES Genoa; Quarto; Veloci Embriaci; Saronno; Pavia; Ostiglia; Bentegodi; Fortitudo; Edera Pola; Treviso; Firenze; Siena; Prato; Legnegaghese (bankruptcy); US Torinese (bankruptcy)

Seconda Divisione 1923–24 was the lower championship of the Lega Nord.

Differently from the higher championship, it was structured on six local groups.

== Regulations ==
Six group of eight clubs, fourteen matchdays. Finals with six clubs, ten matchdays.

Two teams promoted to First Division. Two other clubs to test-matches.

Two relegations for each group and a test-matches for the six placed teams against best Third Division clubs.

== Group A ==
- Derthona 18
- Biellese 14
- Pro Patria 14
- Valenzana 13
- Vercellesi Erranti 12
- Pastore 12
- Varesina 0
- US Torinese (disqualified)

Varesina and US Torinese relegated. US Torinese then went bankrupt. Pastore lost test-match against Veloci Embriaci and relegated.

== Group B ==
- Sestese 21
- Rivarolese 20
- Savona 17
- Vado 17
- Speranza 15
- Veloci Embriaci 10
- Spes Genova 7
- Quarto 0

Spes Genova and Quarto relegated. Veloci Embriaci lost test-match against Pro Gorizia and relegated.

== Group C ==
- Juve Italia 20
- Como 19
- Atalanta 16
- Monza 15
- Esperia 14
- US Milanese 11
- Saronno 11
- Pavia 6

Saronno and Pavia relegated. Pavia then took a year-break for a financial crisis.

== Group D ==
- Mantova 22
- Fanfulla 18
- Piacenza 16
- Trevigliese 14
- Carpi 13
- Bentegodi 12
- Ostiglia 10
- Legnaghese 5

Ostiglia and Legnaghese relegated. Legnaghese then went bankrupt. Bentegodi lost test-match against Triestina and relegated.

== Group E ==
- Olympia Fiume 18
- Dolo 17
- Venezia 17
- Udinese 13
- Petrarca 12
- Treviso 12
- Monfalconese 11
- Edera Pola 0

Edera Pola relegated for bribery. Treviso lost test-match against Monfalconese, which received a wild card as a team of the newly-Italian Julian March, and relegated.

== Group F ==
- Reggiana 22
- Parma 20
- Viareggio 18
- Lucchese 14
- Libertas 13
- Prato 13
- CS Firenze 6
- Siena 4

CS Firenze and Siena relegated. Prato lost test-match against US Milanese and relegated.

== Final group ==
- Derthona 13
- Reggiana 11
- Olympia Fiume 11
- Sestrese 10
- Juve Italia 9
- Mantova 6

Derthona and Reggiana promoted. Later Mantova also promoted as compensation after a match-fixing scandal.
