= 1927–28 Seconda Divisione =

Seconda Divisione
- Season: 1927–28
- Champions: Edera Trieste
- Promoted: 22 clubs to the DDS for championship reform
- Relegated: the league became a local fourth-tier championship
- Matches played: 572

The 1927–28 Seconda Divisione was the second edition of a sub-national third level tournament within the Italian football championship.

It was divided into two fully independent championships, the Northern one which was the main League and the Southern one which was till amatorial. However, another reform occurred at the end of this season.

== Regulations ==
The ”Northern Lower Divisions Directory”, which had its headquarters in Genoa, doubled its championship, after protests from many clubs put in the regional amatorial tournaments by the 1926 reform. It was now composed of six groups of ten clubs, a total of 60 teams. The winners of any group should be promoted, while the last two teams should be relegated. A final for the title was planned.

The ”Southern Lower Divisions Directory”, which had its headquarters in Rome, organized its 28 teams into four groups. The winners of any group of Southern Authority qualified to the final group. The winner of the final group should be promoted.

However, in 1928 the fascists decided to complete the championship reform they partially stopped in 1926. As originally planned, the Higher National Authority would finally organize three championships, while the Northern Lower Authority would lose its hybrid nature to be reduced to a local fourth-tier tournament.

== Teams ==
22 clubs confirmed their spots from the previous year. 38 teams were promoted or invited from the 7 regions of the Third Division.

In Southern Italy 20 clubs confirmed their place while 8 teams were allowed to enter from the 6 regional championships.

== Northern Authority ==
=== Group A ===
	Group A	Pt
1.	Rivarolese	28
2.	Corniglianese	27
3.	Acqui	25
4.	Ventimigliese	23
5.	Albese	22
6.	Genovese	20
7.	Nicese	20
8.	Officine Genoa	18
9.	Vado	18
10.	Cuneese	15
11.	Fiorente	4

- Rivarolese qualified to the finals.
- Rivarolese, Corniglianese, Acqui, Ventimigliese admitted to Higher Directory for championship reform.
- The remaining clubs remained in the league turned into a local championship.
- Officine Genoa merged with Rivarolese.

=== Group B ===
	Group B	Pt
1.	Saronno	33
2.	Seregno	26
3.	Gallaratese	21
4.	Varese	20
5.	Sestese	19
6.	Pro Lissone	18
7.	Cusiana	15
8.	Domo	12
9.	Valle Cervo	12
10.	Juve Italia	9

- Saronno qualified to the finals.
- Saronno, Seregno, Gallaratese, Varese admitted to Higher Directory for championship reform.
- The remaining clubs remained in the league turned into a local championship.
- Valle Cervo, Juve Domo disbanded.

=== Group C ===
	Group C	Pt
1.	Viareggio	30
2.	Sestri Levante	25
3.	Rapallo Ruentes	22
4.	Empoli	18
5.	Le Signe	17
6.	Fiorenza	17
7.	Pontedera	16
8.	Robur Siena	15
9.	Odero Terni	13
10.	Entella	7

- Viareggio qualified to the finals.
- Viareggio, Sestri Levante, Rapallo Ruentes admitted to Higher Directory for championship reform.
- The remaining clubs remained in the league turned into a local championship.
- Fiorenza merged into Fiorentina.

=== Group D ===
	Group C	Pt
1.	Piacenza	27
2.	Codogno	25
3.	Fanfulla	22
4.	Crema	21
5.	Vigevanese	20
6.	Abbiategrasso	18
7.	Vogherese	15
8.	Arduino Pavia	13
9.	Lanificio Manerbio	10
10.	Trevigliese	9

- Piacenza qualified to the finals.
- Piacenza, Fanfulla, Codogno, Crema admitted to Higher Directory for championship reform.
- The remaining clubs remained in the league turned into a local championship.

=== Group E ===
	Group C	Pt
1.	Forlì	30
2.	Faenza	25
3.	Thiene	24
4.	Bentegodi Verona	20
5.	Mirandolese	16
6.	Rovereto	15
7.	Casalecchio	15
8.	Schio	12
9.	Trento	12
10.	Vicenza	11

- Forlì qualified to the finals.
- Forlì, Faenza, Thiene, Trento admitted to Higher Directory for championship reform.
- The remaining clubs remained in the league turned into a local championship.
- Bentegodi Verona merged into Hellas.

=== Group F ===
	Group C	Pt
1.	Edera Trieste	27
2.	Pro Gorizia	25
3.	Fiume	22
4.	Grion Pola	21
5.	Petrarca	15
6.	Libertas Venezia	14
7.	Itala	14
8.	Dolo	13
9.	Montebellunese	0

- Edera Trieste qualified to the finals.
- Edera Trieste, Pro Gorizia, Fiume, Grion Pola admitted to Higher Directory for championship reform.
- The remaining clubs remained in the league turned into a local championship.
- Petrarca merged into Padova and Montebellunese disbanded.

== Southern Authority ==
=== Group A ===
	Classifica girone A	Pt
1.	Rosetana, Roseto degli Abruzzi	12
2.	Pippo Massangioli, Chieti	12
3.	Vigor Ascoli, Ascoli Piceno	10
4.	Vigor Senigallia, Senigallia	4
5.	A.C. Perugia	2
6.	Tiferno	no

Verdetti

- Rosetana qualified to the finals.
- Perugia, Tiferno disqualified and relegated.

=== Group B ===
	Classifica girone B	Pt
1.	Virtus Goliarda, Roma	23
2.	Ostiense, Roma	22
3.	Romano, Roma	20
4.	Ardita, Roma	19
5.	Viterbese, Viterbo	17
6.	Vittoria, Roma	17
7.	Civitavecchiese	9
8.	U.S. Romana, Roma	9
9.	Juventus F.C., Roma	6

Verdetti

- Goliarda qualified to the finals.
- Romano merged with Virtus Goliarda and US Romana disbanded.

=== Group C ===
	Classifica Classifica girone C	Pt
1.	Salernitana	19
2.	Stabia	18
3.	U.S. Lecce	14
4.	Nocerina	10
5.	Scafatese	9
5.	Aversana, Aversa	9
7.	Torremaggiore	3

Verdetti

- Salernitana qualified to the finals.
- Scafatese and Torre Maggiore disqualified and relegated.

=== Group D ===
	Classifica girone D	Pt
1.	Messinese	15
2.	Vigor, Palermo	14
3.	Peloro, Messina	13
4.	Gargallo Siracusa	11
5.	Indomita, Palermo	9
6.	Umberto I, Messina	3

Verdetti

- Messinese qualified to the finals.
- Umberto I disbanded.

=== Southern Finals ===
	Classifica finale Divisione Sud	Pt
1.	Goliarda Roma	7
2.	Rosetana	6
3.	Salernitana	5
4.	Messinese	4

- Goliarda Roma Southern Championship winner.
- The FIGC did not considered Southern Italy ready for a full championship reform, so all clubs were put into a special one-year Southern Championship, postponing any decision to 1929.

== Championship Cup ==
The group winners of Northern Italy played for the national title, because they were considered evidently stronger than the Southern clubs by the FIGC. However, Rivarolese and Saronno retired from this cup.

	Final Group	Pt
1.	Edera Trieste	10
2.	Piacenza	6
3.	Forlì	5
4.	Viareggio	4

- Edera Champions of Second Division 1928. However, as a former football club of the disbanded Italian Republican Party (Edera=ivy, the PRI symbol), it was disliked by the fascists so it was merged with another club from Trieste, Ponziana, to form new ASPE.

== Notes ==
- Luigi Saverio Bertazzoni, Annuario Italiano del Giuoco del Calcio (it.)
