= Luca Belingheri =

Italian footballer

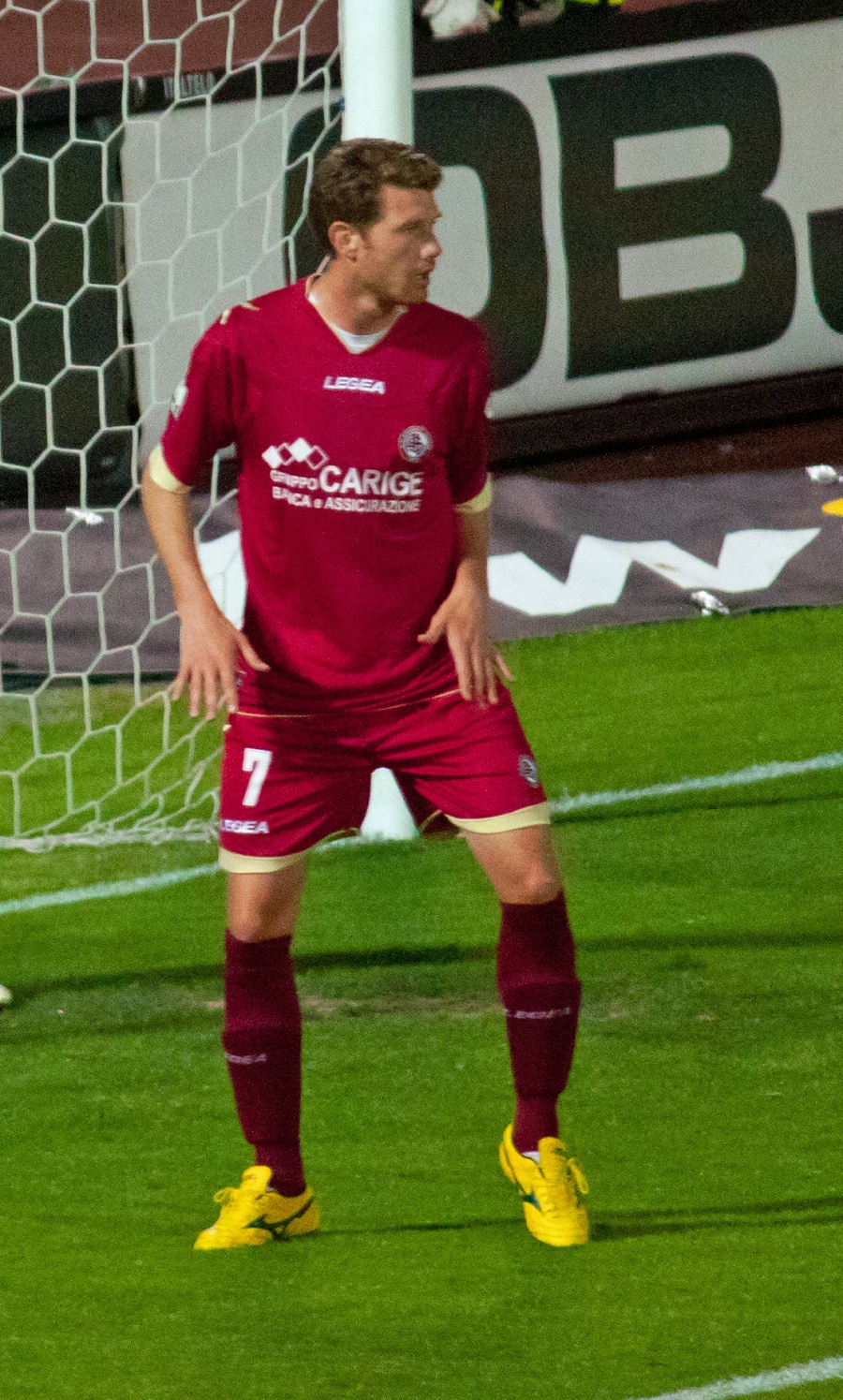

Personal information
- Date of birth: 6 April 1983 (age 43)
- Place of birth: Costa Volpino, Italy
- Height: 1.82 m (6 ft 0 in)
- Position: Midfielder

Senior career*
Years	Team	Apps	(Gls)
2001–2002	Alzano Virescit	26	(1)
2002–2003	Como	2	(0)
2002	→ Siena (loan)	3	(0)
2003–2005	Genoa	0	(0)
2003–2004	→ Como (loan)	16	(1)
2004–2005	→ Ascoli (loan)	20	(0)
2005–2007	AlbinoLeffe	61	(7)
2007–2009	Ascoli	56	(11)
2009–2011	Torino	28	(3)
2011–2015	Livorno	96	(24)
2014	→ Cesena (loan)	14	(2)
2015–2016	Modena	36	(6)
2016–2017	Cremonese	25	(6)
2017–2019	Padova	39	(6)
2019–2020	Pergolettese	8	(0)
Total		430	(67)

Managerial career
- 2021–2023: Cremonese U17
- 2023–2025: Brescia U19
- 2023: Brescia (caretaker)
- 2025–2026: Atalanta U17
- 2026–: Atalanta (youth)
- * Club domestic league appearances and goals

Luca Belingheri (born 6 April 1983) is an Italian former professional footballer who plays as a midfielder and head coach for Atalanta youth team.

== Club career ==
Belingheri started at Alzano in Serie C1 in the 2001–02 season where he made 26 appearances and scored 1 goal. He then moved to Siena of Serie B but he moved again in January 2003 to Como Calcio of Serie A after making just 3 appearances. He made his Serie A debut on 3 May 2003, against A.C. Milan. He stayed at Como Calcio for a year and made 18 scoring a single goal. In 2004, he started his first spell at Ascoli and made 20 appearances. In the summer of 2005, Ascoli bought him outright from Genoa but sent him to AlbinoLeffe in a joint-ownership bid. With AlbinoLeffe Belingheri played 25 games in 2006–07 Serie B. In June 2007 Belingheri returned to Ascoli but again only made 15 starts in 2009–10 Serie B.

He joined Torino in July 2009, as part of the deal, Marco Moro moved to Ascoli. He then moved to Livorno in January 2011. On 24 January 2014, he was loaned to Cesena and scored a goal in his debut match against Varese. In the summer of 2015 is consistent with the Modena; the following year passes to Cremonese.

On 30 August 2019, he signed with Pergolettese. He left the club on 31 January 2020.

=== Later career ===
After leaving Pergolettese in January 2020, Belingheri remained without a club until the summer of 2020, where he was hired as assistant coach of Cremonese's U19 team under head coach Elia Pavesi.

On 18 July 2023, Brescia announced the appointment of Belingheri in charge of their Under-19 team.

On 10 November 2023, Belingheri was appointed in temporary charge of the first team following the dismissal of head coach Daniele Gastaldello. He guided Brescia for a league home game against his former club Cremonese, which ended in a 0–3 loss, then returning back to his previous role following the appointment of Rolando Maran as the club's new head coach.
