= 1963–64 Serie C =

The 1963–64 Serie C was the twenty-sixth edition of Serie C, the third highest league in the Italian football league system.

== Girone A ==
Pos	Team	Pld	W	D	L	GF	GA	GD	Pts	Promotion or relegation
1	Reggiana	34	22	11	1	60	12	+48	55	Promoted to Serie B
2	Savona	34	16	10	8	40	28	+12	42	
3	Como	34	14	13	7	33	28	+5	41	
4	Solbiatese	34	12	11	11	39	32	+7	35	
5	Legnano	34	9	16	9	25	24	+1	34	
6	Cremonese	34	11	11	12	29	26	+3	33	
7	Novara	34	12	9	13	35	33	+2	33	
8	Treviso	34	11	11	12	38	39	−1	33	
9	Ivrea	34	10	13	11	36	40	−4	33	
10	Mestrina	34	10	12	12	23	29	−6	32	
11	Monfalcone C.R.D.A.	34	11	10	13	34	44	−10	32	
12	Fanfulla	34	11	9	14	31	41	−10	31	
13	Vittorio Veneto	34	7	17	10	27	38	−11	31	
14	Rizzoli Milano (Note: Retired at the end of the season.)	34	10	11	13	37	48	−11	31	
15	Biellese	34	9	12	13	27	27	0	30	
15	Marzotto	34	9	12	13	25	31	−6	30	
17	Pordenone	34	6	17	11	24	30	−6	29	Relegated to Serie D
18	Saronno	34	7	13	14	19	32	−13	27	Relegated to Serie D

== Girone B ==
Pos	Team	Pld	W	D	L	GF	GA	GD	Pts	Promotion or relegation
1	Livorno	34	19	10	5	45	18	+27	48	Promoted to Serie B
2	Forlì	34	17	11	6	36	21	+15	45	
3	Pisa	34	14	13	7	28	23	+5	41	
4	Empoli	34	15	9	10	32	18	+14	39	
5	Arezzo	34	12	14	8	34	28	+6	38	
6	Rimini	34	13	10	11	32	30	+2	36	
7	Lucchese	34	11	12	11	36	28	+8	34	
8	Siena	34	12	10	12	32	31	+1	34	
9	Cesena	34	11	11	12	28	30	−2	33	
10	Torres	34	13	6	15	33	33	0	32	
11	Anconitana	34	8	16	10	27	28	−1	32	
12	Perugia	34	10	11	13	35	39	−4	31	
13	Ravenna	34	8	14	12	30	35	−5	30	
14	Carrarese	34	8	14	12	28	39	−11	30	
15	Grosseto	34	9	11	14	27	39	−12	29	
16	Pistoiese	34	8	12	14	31	43	−12	28	
17	Vis Pesaro	34	8	12	14	21	34	−13	28 (Note: Relegated after tie-breaker match: Pistoiese-Vis Pesaro 3-1)	Relegated to Serie D
18	Rapallo Ruentes	34	8	8	18	22	40	−18	24	Relegated to Serie D

== Girone C ==
Pos	Team	Pld	W	D	L	GF	GA	GD	Pts	Promotion or relegation
1	Trani	34	18	10	6	42	21	+21	46	Promoted to Serie B
2	Chieti	34	17	10	7	43	29	+14	44	
3	Sambenedettese	34	15	12	7	45	26	+19	42	
4	Del Duca Ascoli	34	11	16	7	33	21	+12	38	
5	Reggina	34	11	16	7	25	24	+1	38	
6	Salernitana	34	13	10	11	24	25	−1	36	
7	Lecce	34	10	13	11	27	28	−1	33	
8	Casertana	34	9	15	10	26	34	−8	33	
9	Taranto	34	9	14	11	27	28	−1	32	
10	Pescara	34	9	13	12	30	27	+3	31	
11	Siracusa	34	9	13	12	32	35	−3	31	
12	L'Aquila	34	11	9	14	21	25	−4	31	
13	Tevere Roma	34	9	13	12	29	34	−5	31	
14	Maceratese	34	8	15	11	26	31	−5	31	
15	Marsala	34	9	13	12	21	31	−10	31	
16	Akragas	34	9	12	13	31	31	0	30	
17	Trapani (Note: Relegated and later readimitted to Serie C in place of Rizzoli Milano.)	34	11	10	13	27	32	−5	29 (Note: 3 points deducted.)	Relegated to Serie D
18	Bisceglie	34	8	6	20	25	52	−27	22	Relegated to Serie D

== References and sources ==
- Almanacco Illustrato del Calcio – La Storia 1898–2004, Panini Edizioni, Modena, September 2005
