= Marco Moro =

Italian footballer

Personal information
- Date of birth: 27 April 1984 (age 42)
- Place of birth: Paese, Italy
- Height: 1.79 m (5 ft 10 1/2 in)
- Position: Forward

Team information
- Current team: Saronno

Senior career*
Years	Team	Apps	(Gls)
2002–2007	Venezia	60	(25)
2003–2004	→ Südtirol (loan)	12	(2)
2004–2005	→ Portogruaro (loan)	29	(2)
2007–2008	Messina	30	(1)
2008–2009	Torino	0	(0)
2008–2009	→ SPAL (loan)	14	(0)
2009	Ascoli	0	(0)
2009–2010	→ Spezia (loan)	0	(0)
2010–2011	Ascoli	?	(?)
2011	→ Foligno (loan)	?	(?)
2011	Ascoli	?	(?)
2011–2012	Venezia	?	(?)
2012–2013	TurateVerbano	?	(?)
2013–2014	Real Vicenza	?	(?)
2015–	Saronno	?	(?)
- * Club domestic league appearances and goals as of 9 March 2016

Marco Moro (born 27 April 1984) is an Italian footballer who plays for FBC Saronno.

== Career ==
Moro started his professional career at Venezia. After playing in the first match of the season, he was signed by Torino of Serie A on 31 August 2007, the last day of transfer windows. He was immediately farmed to Messina in a co-ownership deal. After the bankruptcy of Messina, he joined SPAL on loan. In July 2009, he went to Ascoli as part of the Luca Belingheri deal. He played once for Ascoli on 15 August at Coppa Italia. On 27 August, he was loaned to Spezia.
