= 1922–23 Seconda Divisione =

Italian football league season

Seconda Divisione
- Season: 1922–23
- Champions: Biellese; 1st title
- Relegated: Casteggio; Entella; Sestese; Officine; Schio; Mantovana; Vicenza; Giorgione; Grion Pola; Fortitudo; Juve Massa (bankruptcy); Chiasso (to Switzerland); Luinese (bankruptcy); OEM (bankruptcy)

Seconda Divisione 1922–23 was the lower championship of the Lega Nord.

Differently from the higher championship, it was structured on six local groups.

== Teams ==
All clubs of former Prima Categoria which did not get a place for the new Prima Divisione, together with the regional champions of former Promozione and CCI local tournaments.

== Regulations ==
Six group of eight clubs, fourteen matchdays. Finals for the title.

No promotions for this year following the agreement between FIGC and Northern League about the reduction of the First Division.

Two relegations for each group and a test-matches for the six placed teams against best Third Division clubs.

== Group A ==
- Sestrese 22
- Vado 19
- Spes Genoa 16
- Pavia 12
- Quarto 12
- Entella 11
- Casteggio 10
- OEM 10

Casteggio and OEM relegated. OEM then went bankrupt. Entella lost test-match against Veloci Embriaci and relegated.

== Group B ==
- Biellese 22
- Valenzana 21
- Saronno 17
- Vercellesi Erranti 16
- Pro Patria 14
- Varese 10
- Sestese 7
- Luinese 6

Sestese and Luinese relegated. Luinese then went bankrupt.

== Group C ==
- Atalanta 20
- Piacenza 19
- Juve Italia 17
- Como 16
- Fanfulla 16
- Monza 11
- Chiasso 11
- Officine 6

Chiasso and Officine relegated. Chiasso left FIGC to ASF.

== Group D ==
- Carpi 25
- Trevigliese 17
- Parma 16
- Legnanese 15
- Bentegodi 13
- Ostiglia 10
- Schio 8
- Mantovana 8

Schio and Mantovana relegated.

== Group E ==
- Edera Pola 20
- Dolo 17
- Monfalcone 16
- Treviso 14
- Venezia 14
- Grion Pola 13
- Vicenza 13
- Giorgione 5

Vicenza and Giorgione relegated. Grion Pola lost test-match against Olympia Fiume and relegated.

== Group F ==
- Viareggio 24
- Libertas 20
- Prato 19
- Reggiana 17
- CS Firenze 16
- Siena 12
- Fortitudo Bologna 7
- Juve Massa 0

Fortitudo Bologna and Juve Massa relegated. Juve Massa then took a year-break.

== Title finals ==
Biellese and Carpi won semifinals. Biellese won the title.
