= 1964–65 Serie B =

Italian football league season

Serie B
- Season: 1964–65
- Champions: Brescia; 1st title

Serie B 1964-65 team distribution

The Serie B 1964–65 was the thirty-third tournament of this competition played in Italy since its creation.

== Teams ==
Reggiana, Livorno and Trani had been promoted from Serie C, while Modena, SPAL and Bari had been relegated from Serie A.

== Final classification ==
Pos	Team	Pld	W	D	L	GF	GA	GR	Pts	Promotion or relegation
1	Brescia (P, C)	38	18	13	7	46	28	1.643	49	Promotion to Serie A
2	Napoli (P)	38	16	16	6	45	21	2.143	48	Promotion to Serie A
3	S.P.A.L. (P)	38	17	13	8	40	27	1.481	47	Promotion to Serie A
4	Lecco	38	16	14	8	50	23	2.174	46	
5	Potenza	38	15	14	9	55	40	1.375	44	
6	Padova	38	14	14	10	32	23	1.391	42	
7	Modena	38	11	19	8	36	28	1.286	41	
8	Catanzaro	38	9	20	9	24	26	0.923	38	
9	Alessandria	38	12	13	13	37	43	0.860	37	
9	Pro Patria	38	13	11	14	32	45	0.711	37	
11	Palermo	38	12	12	14	43	43	1.000	36	
11	Reggiana	38	11	14	13	34	27	1.259	36	
11	Venezia	38	9	18	11	30	33	0.909	36	
11	Verona	38	10	16	12	38	44	0.864	36	
15	Trani	38	12	11	15	29	44	0.659	35	
16	Livorno	38	11	12	15	32	33	0.970	34	
16	Monza	38	9	16	13	32	45	0.711	34	
18	Bari (R)	38	10	13	15	32	41	0.780	33	Relegation to Serie C
19	Triestina (R)	38	8	12	18	26	48	0.542	28	Relegation to Serie C
20	Parma (R)	38	7	9	22	23	54	0.426	23	Relegation to Serie C

Source: Panini
(C) Champions; (P) Promoted; (R) Relegated

== Results ==
Home \ Away	ALE	BAR	BRE	CTZ	LCO	LIV	MOD	MON	NAP	PAD	PAL	PAR	POT	PPA	REA	SPA	TRN	TRI	VEN	HEL
Alessandria		0–0	1–1	3–1	0–0	1–0	1–1	1–0	1–0	1–0	0–1	3–0	0–0	3–1	2–0	2–0	1–1	0–0	0–0	5–3
Bari	1–0		2–2	0–0	2–3	0–1	1–0	2–0	2–1	1–3	2–1	1–0	1–0	1–0	1–0	0–1	0–0	1–1	1–1	1–1
Brescia	0–1	2–0		1–1	1–0	0–0	3–1	1–1	4–1	2–0	0–0	2–1	1–1	1–0	1–0	2–0	1–0	2–0	1–1	2–0
Catanzaro	2–0	1–1	0–0		1–0	3–1	1–1	1–1	1–1	0–0	1–0	3–0	0–0	0–0	1–0	0–0	0–0	1–0	0–1	0–1
Lecco	2–0	3–2	1–0	0–0		2–1	0–0	5–0	3–0	4–1	3–0	3–0	2–3	3–1	1–0	3–0	1–0	0–0	2–0	2–2
Livorno	2–0	1–1	2–0	0–1	1–0		0–0	5–1	0–1	1–0	0–0	3–0	1–1	0–0	0–0	0–0	3–0	0–0	1–0	2–1
Modena	2–1	0–0	1–1	0–0	0–0	3–1		2–1	0–1	2–0	3–0	3–0	2–1	0–0	1–1	0–2	1–0	3–0	1–1	1–1
Monza	1–1	0–0	0–0	2–1	1–1	1–1	0–1		1–1	0–1	3–2	2–0	1–0	0–0	0–0	1–1	3–2	2–0	1–0	2–2
Napoli	1–1	2–0	4–0	2–0	0–0	1–1	1–0	5–0		0–1	2–1	2–0	0–0	3–0	0–0	0–0	1–0	3–0	0–0	2–0
Padova	5–1	0–0	0–0	1–0	0–0	2–0	0–0	0–0	1–1		1–0	0–0	1–0	2–0	2–0	0–1	1–0	1–0	0–0	3–0
Palermo	1–3	2–1	1–2	0–0	0–0	3–0	2–0	2–1	0–0	1–1		1–0	2–1	3–0	0–0	0–0	3–0	2–0	1–2	1–1
Parma	2–1	3–2	1–2	0–1	0–0	0–3	1–1	1–1	1–3	1–0	0–1		2–2	1–2	3–0	1–2	0–1	2–1	0–0	1–0
Potenza	1–1	2–1	1–2	1–1	0–3	2–0	1–1	1–0	1–1	3–1	3–2	2–0		3–0	1–1	2–1	4–1	2–0	4–1	2–1
Pro Patria	2–0	4–2	1–3	1–1	1–0	2–0	1–0	1–0	0–2	1–0	2–1	0–0	1–1		1–0	0–3	2–0	2–0	0–0	2–2
Reggiana	3–0	2–0	1–0	4–0	1–0	0–0	0–0	1–0	1–1	0–0	0–0	0–0	3–1	1–2		2–0	5–0	1–1	1–1	4–0
SPAL	0–0	1–0	2–1	2–0	1–0	1–0	2–0	1–1	0–0	0–0	3–2	1–0	2–3	4–1	2–1		0–0	3–0	1–0	1–1
Trani	1–0	1–0	0–0	1–0	2–2	1–0	0–2	1–0	1–0	1–1	1–1	3–0	0–0	3–1	1–0	0–0		2–1	2–1	1–2
Triestina	3–1	0–1	0–3	1–1	2–1	2–1	2–2	0–2	0–2	0–0	3–1	1–0	1–1	2–0	0–1	1–0	1–1		0–0	1–1
Venezia	4–0	2–1	1–2	0–0	0–0	1–0	0–0	0–0	0–0	0–2	4–5	1–1	2–1	0–0	1–0	2–2	1–0	1–2		1–0
Hellas Verona	1–1	0–0	1–0	0–0	0–0	2–0	1–1	1–2	0–0	2–1	0–0	0–1	0–3	0–0	3–0	1–0	5–1	1–0	1–0	

Source: Almanacco Illustrato del Calcio - La Storia 1898-2004, Panini Edizioni, Modena, September 2005 (in Italian)
Legend: Blue = home team win; Yellow = draw; Red = away team win.

== Attendances ==
#	Club	Average
1	Napoli	44,255
2	Brescia	19,706
3	Palermo	12,097
4	Bari	11,777
5	Modena	10,323
6	Livorno	9,856
7	Venezia	8,820
8	Hellas	7,884
9	Reggiana	7,722
10	Padova	7,691
11	Lecco	7,386
12	Alessandria	6,188
13	Parma	5,531
14	Monza	4,187
15	Catanzaro	3,927
16	Triestina	3,655
17	Pro Patria	3,636
18	Trani	3,407
19	Potenza	3,390

== References and sources ==
- Almanacco Illustrato del Calcio - La Storia 1898-2004, Panini Edizioni, Modena, September 2005

Specific
