= Italian Football Confederation =

Football organization in Italy (1921–1922)

The Italian Football Confederation (CCI, Confederazione Calcistica Italiana) was a secessionist organization which opposed the Italian Football Federation during the 1921–22 season.

== The Confederation ==
Just after World War I, football became the national sport in Italy, with growing economic revenues. However, the Italian Football Championship was still based on an amateur and plethoric structure of 88 clubs divided in regional groups that the democratic organization of the FIGC could not change.

Richest and greatest clubs of northern Italy asked famous coach Vittorio Pozzo for a reform plan in summer 1921, but minor clubs rejected it. Consequently, the 24 strongest clubs resigned from the FIGC and founded the Northern League, the first association football league of the country. The richness of the new league attracted some minor clubs and all southern clubs, which were grouped into a Second Division and a Southern League respectively. Together, they formed the CCI, headquarters in Turin.

As the lexical difference, copied from the American Civil War, showed, the Confederation opposed the Federation with a lighter structure, where the real power was vested in the leagues, which organized their own championships.

Italy had consequently two football champions in 1922, Pro Vercelli for the CCI and US Novese for the FIGC.

Despite its economic success, the CCI suffered from the lack of international recognition by FIFA, while the FIGC remained with a poor championship with bankruptcy risks. The director of La Gazzetta dello Sport, Mr Colombo, asked for a gentleman's agreement which became very similar to a surrender of the FIGC. The championship was expanded to 36 clubs for the 1922–23 season solely, while the 24 clubs format would be accepted from 1923–24 onward. The Northern League victory then allowed the CCI's disbandment.
