= Attilio Marcora =

Italian footballer (1899–1979)

Personal information
- Full name: Attilio Marcora
- Date of birth: 1899
- Date of death: 1979 (aged 79–80)
- Position: Forward

Senior career*
Years	Team	Apps	(Gls)
1918–1921	Pro Patria	24	(3)
1921–1922	Saronno	?	(?)
1922–1924	Legnano	43	(2)
1924–1928	Pro Patria	44	(4)
1928–1930	Varese	?	(?)
1930–1931	Seregno	?	(?)
1931–1932	Galliate	?	(?)
1933–1934	Seregno	?	(?)
1934–1935	Varese	?	(?)

International career
1921	Italy	1	(0)
- * Club domestic league appearances and goals

Attilio Marcora (Italian pronunciation: [atˈtiːljo marˈkɔːra]; 1899 – 1979) was an Italian footballer who played as a forward. On 6 November 1921, he represented the Italy national football team on the occasion of a friendly match against Switzerland in a 1–1 away draw.
