= 1928–29 Prima Divisione =

Lower national league of the 29th Italian football championship

Prima Divisione
- Season: 1928–29
- Champions: Spezia
- Promoted: Spezia; Parma; Monfalcone
- Relegated: solely disbanded clubs
- Matches played: a lot

The 1928–29 Prima Divisione was a lower national league of the 29th Italian football championship.

In 1928, the fascists allowed the FIGC to complete the reform of the league structure of Italian football. The top-level league was the National Division, composed by the two divisions of Serie A and Serie B. Under them, there were the local championship, the major one being the First Division, that in 1935 will take the name of Serie C. The winners of the three groups of First Division would be promoted to Serie B, whereas the scheduled relegations were annulled by the Federation which expanded the division.

== Teams ==
To close the claims of the Northern clubs which had been excluded from the national championships in 1926, half of the members of this tournament were taken from the Second Division: so, the DDS took quite the same members of the disbanded pre-1926 Lega Nord. 21 teams were members of the previous season, 21 promoted or invited club from the Second Division plus Grion Pola as last-minute team were added. Southern clubs were excluded.

42 Northern clubs
plus DDIN's 2D Grion Pola as guest
21 worst clubs of the National Higher Directory's First Division
21 best clubs of the Northern Lower Directory's Second Division

== Regulation ==
Three groups of 14 teams, twenty-six matchdays. Group winners were promoted, ultimate and penultimate clubs should be relegated. A national title was assigned.

== Group A ==
Western Group

	Classifica - Girone A Nord	Pt
1.	Calcio Spezia	41
2.	Sestrese	32
3.	Calcio Savona	30
3.	Ventimigliese	30
5.	Calcio Pisa	28
5.	Sestri Levante	28
7.	Corniglianese	26
8.	Calcio Viareggio	24
8.	Calcio Carrarese	24
8.	Rapallo Ruentes	24
11.	Rivarolese	22
11.	Asti	22
13.	Calcio Lucchese	19
14.	Acqui	14

- Spezia promoted to Serie B 1929-30

== Group B ==
Central Group

	Classifica - Girone B Nord	Pt
1.	Calcio Parma	36
2.	Comense	32
3.	Calcio Fanfulla	31
4.	Derthona	28
4.	Calcio Piacenza	28
4.	Gallaratese	28
7.	Calcio Monza	27
8.	Calcio Valenzana	25
8.	Seregno	25
10.	Codogno	23
10.	Calcio Varese	23
12.	Canottieri Lecco	22
13.	Crema	21
14.	Saronno	15

- Parma promoted to Serie B 1929-30
- Valenzana disbanded

== Group C ==
Eastern Group

	Classifica - Girone C Nord	Pt
1.	Monfalcone	44
2.	Calcio Forlì	41
3.	Calcio Udinese	40
4.	Calcio SPAL	39
5.	ASPE Trieste	35
6.	Grion Pola	32
7.	Mantova	29
7.	Calcio Ancona	29
9.	Faenza	27
10.	Calcio Treviso	24
11.	Thiene	22
13.	Pro Gorizia	21
13.	Trento	13
14.	Calcio Carpi	12
15.	Fiume	7

- Monfalcone promoted to Serie B 1929-30
- Trento relegated for money problem
- Fiume disbanded

== Finals ==
	Classifica - Finali	Pt
1.	Calcio Spezia	3
2.	Calcio Parma	1
3.	Monfalcone	0

- Spezia First Division Champions
