= Direttorio Divisioni Superiori =

Former association football organization in Italy

- Direttorio Divisioni Superiori
- Abbreviation: DDS
- Predecessor: Lega Nord
- Successor: Lega Nazionale Alta Italia
- Founded: 1926; 100 years ago
- Dissolved: 1945; 81 years ago
- Headquarters: Milan; Rome
- Region served: Italy
- Products: Divisione Nazionale; Serie A Serie B Serie C Coppa Italia
- Members: 60–124
- Parent organization: FIGC

Direttorio Divisioni Superiori (English: Higher Divisions Directory) was the ruling body of the major Italian association football championships during the fascist era.

== History ==
The Directory was established through the CONI by the fascists. Italy was turning into a dictatorship, and the government imposed the new system to the sport too. In 1926 the FIGC had huge problems of governance, and the authorities profited by the situation to disband the Leagues replacing them with appointed committees.

The Directory organized the first football at national level, abolishing the division between North and South, and it legalized the professional football. A new championship was created, the Divisione Nazionale, alongside the diminished Prima Divisione. The first one was divided between Serie A and Serie B in 1929, while the second one was substituted by the Serie C in 1935.

World War II interrupted the championships in 1943. At the fall of fascism in 1945, the Directory was automatically abolished. The Lega Nazionale Alta Italia was founded in 1945.

== Chairmen ==
- 1926-1927: Ulisse Baruffini
- 1927-1934: Ottorino Barassi
- 1934-1936: Rodolfo Vecchini
- 1936-1940: Guido Cavalli
- 1940-1943: Federico Sani
