= Direttorio Divisioni Inferiori Nord =

Fascist football authority

The Direttorio Divisioni Inferiori Nord (Italian for Directory of Lower Northern Divisions) was an Italian football organization during the Fascist era. It was created in 1926 on the provision of the Viareggio Charter on the ashes of the dissolved and ephemeral League of Minor Societies, it was based in Genoa and it had jurisdiction over the championship of Second Division of Northern Italy, and over the interregional finals of Third Division. It assigned to its champions a title represented by a tricolor ribbon placed on the players' arms.

It was an authoritarian organization modeled on the regime guidelines, its members being appointed by the president of the FIGC. The first president was Mr. Moraglia. It was dissolved in 1930 under an even more intense centralizing policy.

== Membership ==
- 1926 - 1927: 30 teams
- 1927 - 1928: 60 teams
- 1928 - 1929: 84 teams
- 1929 - 1930: 80 teams

== Sources and bibliography ==
- Il Littoriale, newspaper library of CONI

== Related items ==
- Lega Pro
- Serie C
- Seconda Divisione
