= Seconda Divisione =

Former Italian Football Championship

Seconda Divisione (Second Division) was the name of the second level of the Italian Football Championship from 1921 to 1926. The competition was initially founded in opposition to the FIGC by the clubs of Northern Italy, which disagreed the old format of the championship, based on plethoric regional groups. In 1921–22, two concurrent championships took place, before FIGC accepted the new format for 1922–23.

== History ==
=== Northern League ===
The Seconda Divisione was formed by the clubs of the former Prima Categoria of the Lega Nord (Northern League) which did not enter into the new Prima Divisione. The Lega Sud (Southern League) had its own Seconda Divisione too, but it was simply the old Promozione which changed its name. The Lega Nord championship was the main competition, and after a pilot edition in 1921, from 1922 it was divided in six groups of eight teams each, becoming four groups of ten teams from 1924. The winners of the groups qualified for the final (Northern League Final) while the last teams were relegated in Terza Divisione (Third Division).

=== Northern Lower Directory ===
Because of the fascist Viareggio Charter, in 1926 the Seconda Divisione became the third Italian championship, as it happened in England in 1992. In Northern Italy it was formed by the worst clubs of the old Seconda and the best ones of the Terza, while in Southern Italy no changes took place. It was organized by two authorities, the Direttorio Divisioni Inferiori Nord (Lower Division Directory North) and the South one.

=== Regional tournaments ===
In 1929 with the creation of the Serie A and Serie B championships the Seconda Divisione became the fourth level of the Italian Football. In 1935 with the creation of the Serie C championship the Seconda Divisione became the fifth level of the Italian football, and it was reduced to a local tournament. In 1948 with the creation of the Promozione championship the Seconda Divisione became the sixth level of the Italian championship. In 1952 with the creation of the IV Serie championship the Seconda Divisione became the seventh level. In 1959 it was disbanded.

== See also ==
- Divisione Nazionale
- Serie A
