= Lega Nord (football) =

Former association football organization in Italy

- Lega Nord
- Abbreviation: LN
- Predecessor: none
- Successor: Direttorio Divisioni Superiori
- Founded: 1921; 105 years ago
- Dissolved: 1926; 100 years ago
- Headquarters: Milan
- Region served: Italy
- Products: Prima Divisione; Seconda Divisione
- Members: 24–84
- Parent organization: CCI; FIGC

Lega Nord (English: North League) was the first association football league in Italy.

== League ==
The League born in summer 1921 in opposition to the Italian Football Federation. The greatest and richest clubs of Northern Italy unsuccessfully asked for a reform of the amatorial and crowded Italian Football Championship. The 24 major clubs consequently resigned from the FIGC and founded the North League on the model of the English Football League. The headquarters were in Milan. They created their own private championship, the First Division, that received also the adhesion of all Southern clubs, that were united into a Southern League, and of some minor clubs that were grouped into a Second Division. Together, they created the Italian Football Confederation in opposition to the Federation.

The lack of international recognition by the FIFA suggested an agreement with the poor FIGC, under mediation of the Gazzetta dello Sport director, Mr Colombo. The FIGC accepted the First Division as its new major competition, and the CCI was disbanded. The clubs of the old FIGC First Category which were excluded from the First Division joined the North League into a new competition, the Second Division.

The North League was disbanded by the fascists in 1926. They transformed the league into a national appointed committee, the Direttorio Divisioni Superiori. After the war and the fall of fascism, the Lega Nazionale Professionisti was restored with a national structure. In 2010, the Football League was transformed into present-day Lega Serie A.

== Membership ==
- 1921-1922: top 24 clubs
- 1922-1923: top 84 clubs
- 1923-1924: top 72 clubs
- 1924-1925: top 64 clubs
- 1925-1926: top 68 clubs

== Presidents ==
- 1921-1924: Ulisse Baruffini
- 1924-1926: Enrico Olivetti
