= List of Genoa CFC seasons =

Genoa Cricket and Football Club is an Italian professional football club based in Genoa, Liguria, who play their matches in Stadio Luigi Ferraris. The club was formed in 1893, and the club's formal debut in an official league was in 1898.

The club has won the Serie A nine times, Serie B six times and the Coppa Italia once.

Genoa has played 75 seasons in the Serie A, 34 seasons in the Serie B, and two seasons in the Serie C (or equivalent).

This list details the club's achievements in major competitions, and the top scorers for each season. Top scorers in bold were also the top scorers in the Italian league that season. Records of local or regional competitions are not included due to them being considered of less importance.

== Key ==
- Pld = Matches played
- W = Matches won
- D = Matches drawn
- L = Matches lost
- GF = Goals for
- GA = Goals against
- Pts = Points
- Pos = Final position
- Serie A = 1st Tier in Italian League
- Serie B = 2nd Tier in Italian League
- Serie C = 3rd Tier in Italian League
- Prima Categoria = 1st Tier until 1922
- Promozione = 2nd Tier until 1922
- Prima Divisione = 1st Tier until 1926
- Prima Divisione = 2nd Tier (1926–1929)
- Seconda Divisione = 2nd Tier until 1926
- Seconda Divisione = 3rd Tier (1926–1929)
- Divisione Nazionale = 1st Tier (1926–1929)
- RU = Runner-Up
- SF = Semi-finals
- QF = Quarter-finals
- R16 = Last 16
- R32 = Last 32
- QR1 = First Qualifying Round
- QR2 = Second Qualifying Round
- QR3 = Third Qualifying Round
- PO = Play-Offs
- 1R = Round 1
- 2R = Round 2
- 3R = Round 3
- GS = Group Stage
- 2GS = Second Group Stage
- EC = European Cup (1955–1992)
- UCL = UEFA Champions League (1993–present)
- CWC = UEFA Cup Winners' Cup (1960–1999)
- UC = UEFA Cup (1971–2008)
- UEL = UEFA Europa League (2009–present)
- USC = UEFA Super Cup
- INT = Intercontinental Cup (1960–2004)
- WC = FIFA Club World Cup (2005–present)

**Champions**	Runners-up	Promoted	Relegated	1st Tier	2nd Tier	3rd Tier	4th Tier	5th Tier	6th Tier	7th Tier	8th Tier

== Seasons ==
Results of league and cup competitions by season
Season	Division	Pld	W	D	L	GF	GA	Pts	Pos	Cup	Supercoppa Italiana	Cup	Result	Player(s)	Goals
Season	League									Cup	Supercoppa Italiana	UEFA - FIFA		Top goalscorer(s)	
1898	Campionato Italiano Finali (1)	2	2	0	0	4	2	4	**W**					n/a	
1899	Campionato Italiano Finali (1)	1	1	0	0	3	1	2	**W**					n/a	
1900	Campionato Italiano Finali (1)	2	2	0	0	10	1	4	**W**					n/a	
1901	Campionato Italiano Finali (1)	1	0	0	1	0	3	0	2nd	RU				n/a	
1902	Campionato Italiano Finali (1)	4	4	0	0	11	4	8	**W**	SF				Enrico Pasteur	3
1903	Prima Categoria Finali (1)	1	1	0	0	3	0	2	**W**					Joseph William Agar; Henri Dapples	1
1904	Prima Categoria Finali (1)	1	1	0	0	1	0	2	**W**					Étienne Bugnion	1
1905	Girone Nazionali (1)	6	2	4	0	8	6	8	2nd					Luigi Pollak	4
1906	Girone Nazionali (1)	6	2	2	2	7	9	6	3rd					Étienne Bugnion	2
1907	Eliminatorie Liguria (1)	2	0	1	1	2	4	1	1R					n/a	
1908	Did not participate														
1909	Semifinale Ligure-Piemontese (1)	5	2	2	1	9	9	6	SF					Daniel Hug	4
1909–10	Campionato Federale (1)	16	7	3	6	31	23	17	5th					Henry Elliott	7
1910–11	Prima Categoria Ligure-Lombarda-Piemontese(1)	16	7	0	9	22	27	14	5th					Giulio Crocco	6
1911–12	Prima Categoria (1)	18	10	4	4	35	21	24	3rd					A. Miller	7
1912–13	Prima Categoria Sezione Ligure-Lombarda (1); Prima Categoria Finali Nazionali (1)	10; 10	8; 6	0; 1	2; 3	33; 21	12; 13	16; 13	2nd 2nd					John Grant	19
1913–14	Prima Categoria Sezione Piemontese-Ligure (1); Prima Categoria Finali Nazionali (1)	18; 10	14; 6	13; 2	1; 2	49; 22	19; 11	31; 14	2nd 2nd					John Grant	22
1914–15	Prima Categoria Sezione Piemontese-Ligure (1); Prima Categoria Semifinali Nazionali Girone A (1); Prima Categoria Finali Nazionali (1)	10; 6; 5	9; 5; 3	0; 0; 1	1; 1; 1	61; 25; 13	5; 5; 11	18; 10; 7	1st 1st **W**					Aristodemo Santamaria	26
1915–16	World War I														
1916–17	World War I														
1917–18	World War I														
1918–19	World War I														
1919–20	Prima Categoria Sezione Ligure (1); Prima Categoria Semifinali Nazionali Girone A (1); Prima Categoria Finali Nazionali (1)	10; 10; 2	9; 9; 0	1; 1; 1	0; 0; 1	49; 24; 3	3; 4; 4	19; 19; 1	1st 1st 3rd					Enrico Sardi	22
1920–21	Prima Categoria Sezione Ligure (1); Prima Categoria Semifinali Nazionali (1)	14; 6	8; 2	3; 3	3; 1	23; 9	8; 8	19; 7	2nd 2nd					Enrico Sardi	9
1921–22	Prima Categoria Lega Nord Girone B (1)	22	16	5	1	61	13	37	1st					Enrico Sardi	19
1922–23	Prima Divisione Lega Nord Girone B (1)	22	17	5	0	61	18	39	**W**					Edoardo Catto	19
1923–24	Prima Divisione Lega Nord Girone A (1)	22	14	5	3	50	13	33	**W**					Aristodemo Santamaria	13
1924–25	Prima Divisione Lega Nord Girone A (1)	22	13	4	5	48	23	30	1st					Edoardo Catto	13
1925–26	Prima Divisione Girone B (1)	22	13	2	7	48	29	28	3rd					Edoardo Catto	13
1926–27	Divisione Nazionale Girone A (1); Divisione Nazionale Finale (1)	18; 10	10; 4	4; 1	4; 5	37; 15	15; 21	24; 9	3rd 4th					Virgilio Felice Levratto	18
1927–28	Divisione Nazionale Girone A (1); Divisione Nazionale Finale (1)	20; 14	13; 7	3; 3	4; 4	42; 30	21; 27	29; 17	2nd 2nd					Virgilio Felice Levratto	20
1928–29	Divisione Nazionale Girone B (1)	30	17	5	8	71	35	39	4th					Ercole Bodini	16
1929–30	Serie A (1)	34	20	8	6	63	39	48	2nd					Elvio Banchero	17
1930–31	Serie A (1)	34	22	3	9	58	47	45	4th					Elvio Banchero	17
1931–32	Serie A (1)	34	11	8	15	48	56	30	11th					Alfredo Mazzoni	11
1932–33	Serie A (1)	34	13	8	13	58	60	34	8th					Juan Esposto	15
1933–34	Serie A (1)	34	8	8	18	33	55	24	17th					Alfredo Mazzoni	8
1934–35	Serie B Girone A (2)	29	18	6	5	48	23	42	1st					Giuseppe Scategni	10
1935–36	Serie A (1)	30	7	14	9	38	44	28	11th	R16				Julio Libonatti	8
1936–37	Serie A (1)	30	11	11	8	51	36	33	6th	**W**				Alfredo Marchionneschi	18
1937–38	Serie A (1)	30	15	8	7	50	35	38	3rd	R16				Carlos Servetti	11
1938–39	Serie A (1)	30	14	5	11	56	47	33	5th	SF				Alfredo Lazzaretti	17
1939–40	Serie A (1)	30	14	5	11	56	47	33	5th	RU				Ugo Conti	13
1940-41	Serie A (1)	30	10	9	11	46	44	29	10th	R32				Giacomo Neri	11
1941-42	Serie A (1)	30	13	11	6	53	35	37	4th	R16				Bruno Ispiro	17
1942–43	Serie A (1)	30	14	5	11	59	53	33	5th	SF				Guglielmo Trevisan	20
1943–44	World War II														
1944–45	World War II														
1945–46	Serie A Alta Italia (1)	26	6	7	13	21	46	19	12th					Pietro Sotgiu	6
1946–47	Serie A (1)	38	13	10	15	53	53	36	12th					Riccardo Dalla Torre	16
1947–48	Serie A (1)	40	15	7	18	68	65	37	13th					Riccardo Dalla Torre	18
1948–49	Serie A (1)	38	14	12	12	51	51	40	7th					Juan Carlos Verdeal	11
1949–50	Serie A (1)	38	13	8	17	45	64	34	12th					Mario Boyé	12
1950–51	Serie A (1)	38	9	9	20	46	72	27	20th					Bror Mellberg	13
1951–52	Serie B (2)	38	17	8	13	61	38	42	5th					Attilio Frizzi	21
1952–53	Serie B (2)	34	16	12	6	38	23	44	1st					Giorgio Dal Monte	10
1953–54	Serie A (1)	34	10	8	16	36	50	28	12th					Giorgio Dal Monte	8
1954–55	Serie A (1)	34	9	13	12	34	44	31	11th					Attilio Frizzi	9
1955–56	Serie A (1)	34	12	9	13	50	52	33	10th					Attilio Frizzi	14
1956–57	Serie A (1)	34	9	12	13	36	46	30	16th					Antonio Corso; Attilio Frizzi	6
1957–58	Serie A (1)	34	9	12	13	53	60	30	13th	GS				Paolo Barison	17
1958–59	Serie A (1)	34	10	10	14	44	62	30	12th	3rd				Paolo Barison	16
1959–60	Serie A (1)	34	4	10	20	21	50	18	18th	R16				Paolo Barison	6
1960–61	Serie B (2)	38	14	14	10	47	42	35	13th	1R				Gastone Bean	14
1961–62	Serie B (2)	38	22	10	6	64	28	54	1st	1R				Gastone Bean	20
1962–63	Serie A (1)	34	9	10	15	32	48	28	15th	QF				Eddie Firmani	8
1963–64	Serie A (1)	34	10	10	14	33	35	30	8th	3R				Gastone Bean	8
1964–65	Serie A (1)	34	8	12	14	30	46	28	16th	QF				Gianfranco Zigoni	8
1965–66	Serie B (2)	38	15	14	9	44	35	44	5th	1R				Gianfranco Zigoni	8
1966–67	Serie B (2)	38	12	12	14	39	33	36	12th	1R				Marcos Locatelli	9
1967–68	Serie B (2)	40	9	18	13	36	31	36	17th	1R				Enzo Ferrari	13
1968–69	Serie B (2)	38	10	21	7	36	29	41	6th	GS				Paolo Morelli	13
1969–70	Serie B (2)	38	6	17	15	19	32	29	20th	GS				Giovan Battista Benvenuto; Paolo Morelli	3
1970–71	Serie C Girone B (3)	38	22	12	4	36	12	56	1st					Sergio Cini; Walter Speggiorin	9
1971–72	Serie B (2)	38	14	13	11	35	34	41	10th	GS				Sidio Corradi	10
1972–73	Serie B (2)	38	20	13	5	47	26	53	1st	GS				Sidio Corradi	16
1973–74	Serie A (1)	30	4	9	17	16	37	17	15th	GS				Sidio Corradi	5
1974–75	Serie B (2)	38	14	10	14	31	33	38	7th	GS				Roberto Pruzzo	13
1975–76	Serie B (2)	38	14	17	7	57	33	45	1st	2R				Roberto Pruzzo	20
1976–77	Serie A (1)	30	8	11	11	40	45	27	11th	GS				Roberto Pruzzo	23
1977–78	Serie A (1)	30	5	15	10	23	33	25	14th	GS				Roberto Pruzzo	11
1978–79	Serie B (2)	38	11	13	14	34	35	35	12th	GS				Oscar Damiani	17
1979–80	Serie B (2)	38	11	16	11	33	34	38	11th	GS				Roberto Russo	6
1980–81	Serie B (2)	38	17	14	7	47	29	48	3rd	GS				Roberto Russo	13
1981–82	Serie A (1)	30	6	13	11	24	29	25	13th	GS				Massimo Briaschi	8
1982–83	Serie A (1)	30	6	15	9	34	38	27	11th	GS				Massimo Briaschi	13
1983–84	Serie A (1)	30	6	13	11	24	36	25	14th	GS				Massimo Briaschi	13
1984–85	Serie B (2)	38	13	14	11	38	32	40	6th	R16				Giuliano Fiorini	11
1985–86	Serie B (2)	38	14	12	12	35	31	40	7th	1R				Oscar Tacchi	8
1986–87	Serie B (2)	38	12	18	8	44	39	42	6th	1R				Luigi Marulla	10
1987–88	Serie B (2)	38	9	14	15	25	32	32	14th	1R				Luigi Marulla	7
1988–89	Serie B (2)	38	16	19	3	51	35	13	1st	1R				Davide Fontolan; Marco Nappi	7
1989–90	Serie A (1)	34	6	17	11	27	31	29	11th	2R				Davide Fontolan	10
1990–91	Serie A (1)	34	14	12	8	51	36	40	4th	R16				Carlos Aguilera	16
1991–92	Serie A (1)	34	9	11	14	35	47	29	14th	QF		UC	SF	Carlos Aguilera	22
1992–93	Serie A (1)	34	7	17	10	41	55	31	13th	R16				Tomáš Skuhravý	12
1993–94	Serie A (1)	34	8	16	10	32	40	32	11th	1R				Tomáš Skuhravý	9
1994–95	Serie A (1)	34	10	10	14	34	49	40	15th	3R				Tomáš Skuhravý	14
1995–96	Serie B (2)	38	14	10	14	56	52	52	7th	2R				Vincenzo Montella	23
1996–97	Serie B (2)	38	15	16	7	58	31	61	5th	R16				Michaël Goossens	12
1997–98	Serie B (2)	38	14	9	15	50	53	51	9th	R32				Federico Giampaolo; Mohamed Kallon	10
1998–99	Serie B (2)	38	16	9	13	51	42	57	6th	R32				Cosimo Francioso	18
1999–2000	Serie B (2)	38	16	9	13	51	42	57	6th	2R				Cosimo Francioso	27
2000–01	Serie B (2)	38	10	17	11	44	39	47	12th	GS				Marco Carparelli	13
2001–02	Serie B (2)	38	10	17	11	43	40	47	12th	R32				Cosimo Francioso	16
2002–03	Serie B (2)	38	9	12	17	47	51	39	18th	GS				Adrian Mihalcea	10
2003–04	Serie B (2)	46	13	16	17	57	62	55	16th	GS				Sasa Bjelanovic; Diego Milito	12
2004–05	Serie B (2)	42	19	19	4	72	44	76	22nd	GS				Diego Milito	21
2005–06	Serie C1 Girone A (3)	34	15	14	5	42	27	56	2nd	1R				Corrado Grabbi	8
2006–07	Serie B (2)	42	23	9	10	68	44	78	3rd	R16				Giuseppe Greco	11
2007–08	Serie A (1)	38	13	9	16	44	52	48	10th	2R				Marco Borriello	19
2008–09	Serie A (1)	38	19	11	8	56	39	68	5th	R16				Diego Milito	26
2009–10	Serie A (1)	38	14	9	15	57	61	51	9th	R16		UEL	GS	Rodrigo Palacio	8
2010–11	Serie A (1)	38	14	9	15	45	47	51	10th	R16				Antonio Floro Flores	10
2011–12	Serie A (1)	38	11	9	18	50	69	42	17th	R16				Rodrigo Palacio	21
2012–13	Serie A (1)	38	8	14	16	38	52	38	17th	3R				Marco Borriello	12
2013–14	Serie A (1)	38	11	11	16	41	50	44	14th	3R				Alberto Gilardino	16
2014–15	Serie A (1)	38	16	11	11	62	47	59	6th	4R				Iago Falque	13
2015–16	Serie A (1)	38	13	7	18	45	48	46	11th	R16				Leonardo Pavoletti	15
2016–17	Serie A (1)	38	9	9	20	38	64	36	16th	R16				Giovanni Simeone	12
2017–18	Serie A (1)	38	11	8	19	33	43	41	12th	R16				Gianluca Lapadula	6
2018–19	Serie A (1)	38	8	14	16	39	57	38	17th	4R				Krzysztof Piątek	19
2019–20	Serie A (1)	38	10	9	19	47	73	39	17th	R16				Domenico Criscito	10
2020–21	Serie A (1)	38	10	12	16	47	58	42	11th	R16				Mattia Destro	10
2021–22	Serie A (1)	38	4	16	18	27	60	28	19th	R16				Mattia Destro	9
2022–23	Serie B (2)	38	21	11	6	53	28	73	2nd	R16				Albert Guðmundsson	14
2023–24	Serie A (1)	38	12	13	13	45	45	49	11th	R16				Albert Guðmundsson	16
2024–25	Serie A (1)	38	10	13	15	37	49	43	13th	2R				Andrea Pinamonti	10
