= 1945–46 Serie C =

Italian football league season

The 1945–46 Serie C was a special edition of Serie C, the third highest league in the Italian football league system. Best clubs of Northern Italy were admitted as special guests into the 1945–46 Serie B-C Alta Italia.

== Legend ==
Promoted
Relegated

== Northern Italy ==
Northern Italy sides were divided in several rounds (gironi). The winners qualified to a tournament to determine the only team promoted to 1946–47 Serie B. None of the teams relegated.

=== Girone A ===
Venezia Giulia

Pos	Team	Pld	Pts
1	Cormonese	24	35
2	Ponziana (Note: Ponziana Trieste was invited by Josip Broz Tito to join the Yugoslavian Premier League for the 1946-47 season. They accepted, but they maintained a reserve team in the Italian Serie C too.)	24	33
3	Ampelea Isola d'Istria (Note: Ampelea Isola d'Istria left the Italian Football Federation at the end of the season and joined the Yugoslavian league as MNK Izola.)	24	33
4	Edera Trieste	24	32
5	Monfalconese	24	31
6	Pro Cervignano	24	27
7	SAICI Torviscosa	24	20
8	Itala Gradisca	24	19
9	Pieris	24	18
10	Turriaco (D)	24	17
11	Sant'Anna Trieste	24	16
12	Ronchi	24	13
13	Sagrado	24	12

(D) Disbanded after this season.

=== Girone B ===
Eastern Veneto

Pos	Team	Pld	Pts
1	Mestrina	26	43
2	Montebelluna	26	31
3	Pordenone	26	31
4	DAM Valdagno	26	28
5	Pro Mogliano	26	27
6	Lanerossi Schio	26	26
7	Giorgione	26	26
8	Vittorio Veneto	26	26
9	Bassano	26	26
10	Sandonà	26	25
11	Rovigo	26	22
12	Thiene	26	18
13	Feltrese	26	18
14	Belluno	26	14

=== Girone C ===
Western Veneto

Pos	Team	Pld	Pts
1	Legnago	22	0
2	Parmavecchia	22	0
3	Bolzano	22	26
4	Audace San Michele	22	0
5	Gonzaga	22	0
6	Villafranca (D)	22	0
7	Lonigo	22	0
8	Petrarca Padova	22	0
9	Cologna Veneta	22	0
10	Mossina Guastalla	22	0
11	Pro Italia	22	0

(D) Disbanded after this season.

=== Girone D - Piedmont ===
Pos	Team	Pld	Pts
1	Asti (Note: Asti qualified to the semifinals after qualification match with Rapallo Ruentes.)	24	33
2	Volpianese	24	30
3	Divisione "Cremona" (D)	24	26
4	Acqui	24	24
5	Speranza Savona	24	23
6	Saviglianese	24	23
7	Fossanese	24	23
8	Ivrea	24	23
9	Piemonte (D)	24	18
10	Aosta	24	18
11	Saluzzo	24	17 (Note: 1 point deducted.)
12	Pinerolo	24	17
13	Veloces Biella	24	8

(D) Disbanded after this season.

=== Girone D - Liguria ===
Pos	Team	Pld	Pts
1	Rapallo Ruentes (Note: Asti qualified to the semifinals after qualification match with Rapallo Ruentes.)	26	39
2	Bolzanetese Virtus	26	33
3	Spezia (Note: Later admitted to Serie B in place of Ausonia Spezia.)	26	33
4	Pontedecimo	26	32
5	Rivarolese	26	31
6	Sarzanese	26	28
7	Entella	26	28
8	Sestri Levante	26	23
9	Corniglianese	26	22
10	Levanto	26	21
11	Serravalle	26	21
12	Lavagnese	26	17
13	Tigullio	26	14
14	Sant'Agostino	26	8

=== Girone E ===
Northern Lombardy

Pos	Team	Pld	Pts
1	Vimercatese	22	0
2	Pro Lissone	22	0
3	Sondrio	22	0
4	Mariano Comense	22	0
5	Meda	22	0
6	Caratese	22	0
7	Monza	22	0
8	Tirano	22	0
9	Pavia	22	0
10	Vis Nova Giussano	22	0
11	Osnago (D)	22	0
12	Cantù	22	0

(D) Disbanded after this season.

=== Girone F ===
Western Lombardy

Pos	Team	Pld	Pts
1	Parabiago	22	0
2	Calciatori Bustesi	22	0
3	Sommese	22	0
4	Pirelli Milano	22	0
5	Sparta Novara	22	0
6	Saronno	22	0
7	Rhodense	22	0
8	Falck Sesto S.G.	22	0
9	Besozzo Sommese (Note: Voluntary relegated.)	22	0
10	Gattinara	22	0
11	Redaelli Rogoredo (D)	22	0
12	Mortara	22	0

(D) Disbanded after this season.

=== Girone G ===
Eastern Lombardy

Pos	Team	Pld	Pts
1	Melzo	22	0
2	Breda Sesto S.G.	22	0
3	Falco Albino	22	0
4	Pro Romano	22	0
5	Pro Palazzolo	22	0
6	Vita Nova	22	0
7	Orceana	22	0
8	Clarense	22	0
9	Cassano	22	0
10	Ardens Bergamo	22	0
11	Trevigliese	22	0
12	Gerli Cusano Milanino	22	0

=== Girone H ===
Southern Lombardy

Pos	Team	Pld	Pts
1	Stradellina	22	31
2	Trinese	22	29
3	Pro Broni (D)	22	26
4	Medese	22	25
5	Derthona	22	25
6	Codogno	22	24
7	Fiorenzuola	22	23
8	Olubra	22	22
9	Melegnanese	22	19
10	Fidenza	22	17
11	Sant'Angelo Lodigiano	22	15 (Note: 1 point deducted.)
12	Soresinese	22	6

(D) Disbanded after this season.

=== Girone I ===
Emilia

Pos	Team	Pld	Pts
1	Carpi (Note: Excluded from the semifinals for disciplinary reasons.)	22	29
2	Bondenese	22	28
3	Ravenna	22	27
4	Faenza	22	25
5	Centese	22	25
6	Rimini	22	24
7	Mirandolese	22	23
8	Finale Emilia	22	22
9	Imolese	22	22
10	Baracca Lugo	22	20
11	Riccione	22	13
12	Amatori Bologna	22	6

=== Semifinals ===
==== Girone A ====
Pos	Team	Pld	Pts
1	Mestrina	4	7
2	Cormonese	4	5
3	Legnago	4	0

==== Girone B ====
Pos	Team	Pld	Pts
1	Asti	8	12
2	Stradellina	8	10
3	Vimercatese	8	8
4	Parabiago	8	7
5	Melzo	8	3

=== Final ===
Team 1	Agg.	Team 2	1st leg	2nd leg
Asti	2-7	Mestrina	0-0	2-7

Mestrina promoted to 1946–47 Serie B.

== Central and Southern Italy ==
All the winners of the rounds (gironi) were promoted to 1946–47 Serie B; however, clubs participating as special guests could not be promoted. Later other teams were admitted to Serie B to create a southern round.

=== Girone A ===
Tuscany

Pos	Team	Pld	Pts
1	Prato	26	37
2	Lucchese (Note: Later admitted to Serie B.)	26	36
3	Pistoiese	26	31
4	Viareggio	26	30
5	Empoli	26	30
6	Signe	26	27
7	Pontedera	26	27
8	Arezzo	26	26
9	Grosseto	26	26
10	Pisa (Note: Played as guest for war damages to their stadium. Readmitted by right in Serie B.)	26	24
11	Carrarese (Note: Later admitted to Serie B following 1943 results.)	26	23
12	Orbetello (Note: Relegated and later readmitted to 1946–47 Serie C.)	26	18
13	Sangiovannese	26	16
14	Montevarchi	26	11

Source: Panini

=== Girone B ===
Umbria and Marche

Pos	Team	Pld	Pts
1	Perugia	24	42
2	Foligno (Note: The club was admitted to 1946–47 Serie B at first, but renounced to take part for financial reasons.)	24	33
3	Portorecanati	24	30
4	Chieti	24	29
5	Vigor Senigallia	24	29
6	Vis Sauro Pesaro	24	26
7	Giulianova	24	26
8	Virtus Spoleto	24	25
9	Sambenedettese	24	24 (Note: 1 point deducted.)
10	Maceratese	24	23
11	Ascoli	24	23
12	Urbino (Note: Relegated and later readmitted to 1946–47 Serie C.)	24	18
13	Fano	24	18
14	Gubbio	24	17

=== Girone C ===
Lazio and Abruzzo

Pos	Team	Pld	Pts
1	Alba Roma (P)	26	39
2	Italia Libera Roma (Note: Merged with Alba Ala Roma at the end of the season to form US Alba Trastevere.) (E)	26	38
3	Rieti (Note: Later admitted to Serie B.)	26	33
4	Trastevere Roma (E)	26	29
5	Ternana (Note: Later admitted to Serie B following 1943 results.)	26	28
6	L'Aquila	26	27
7	Forza e Coraggio	26	24
8	Civitavecchia	26	24
9	Viterbese	26	24
10	Civitacastellana	26	23
11	Juventus Roma (Note: Merged with fresh-promoted Almas Roma after this season.)	26	23 (Note: 1 point deducted.)
12	Trionfale Roma	26	21
13	Tivoli	26	20
14	Colleferro	26	10

Source: Panini
(E) Eliminated; (P) Promoted

=== Girone D ===
Campania and Basilicata

Pos	Team	Pld	Pts
1	Benevento (Note: Not promoted because playing this championship only as special guests.)	22	31
2	Gladiator (Note: Voluntary relegated for debts.)	22	31
3	Scafatese (Note: Promoted as best titular club of this group.)	22	29
4	Torrese (Note: Later admitted to Serie B.)	22	28
5	Nocerina	22	26
6	Stabia	22	24
7	Frattese	22	23
8	Portici	22	21
9	Casertana	22	21
10	Avellino	22	15
11	Ercolanese	22	12
12	Bagnolese (Note: Relegated and later readmitted to 1946–47 Serie C.)	22	6
13	Potenza (Note: Excluded during the Championship, but later readmitted to 1946–47 Serie C.)	12	0

=== Girone E ===
Apulia

Pos	Team	Pld	Pts
1	Lecce	24	43
2	Arsenale Taranto (Note: Later admitted to Serie B.)	24	40
3	Audace Taranto	24	32
4	Foggia	24	28
5	Brindisi	24	26
6	Pro Italia Taranto (Note: Pro Italia Taranto merged with Audace Taranto at the end of the season to form A.S. Taranto.)	24	25
7	Altamura	24	22
8	Castellana	24	19
9	Molfetta	24	19
10	Barletta	24	18
11	Trani	24	16
12	Vastese	24	13
13	Liberty Bari	24	8

=== Girone F ===
Calabria and Sicily

Pos	Team	Pld	Pts
1	Leone Palermo (Note: Merged with Palermo at the end of the season.) (E)	20	28
2	Cosenza (Note: Promoted as best titular club of this group.) (P)	20	27
3	Catanzaro (Note: Later admitted to Serie B.) (G)	20	27
4	Siracusa	20	25
5	Messina	20	24
6	Gazzi Messina	20	24
7	Reggina	20	21
8	Virtus Catania (Note: Virtus Catania and U.S. Catanese merged at the end of the season to form Catania 1946.)	20	18
9	Crotone	20	16 (Note: 1 point deducted.)
10	Leonzio (Note: Volutary relegated for debts.) (D, R)	20	15
11	U.S. Catanese (E)	20	6
12	Termini Imerese (Note: Retired during the championship.) (D, T)	–	0

Source: Panini
(D) Disqualified; (E) Eliminated; (G) Guests; (P) Promoted; (R) Relegated; (T) Qualified, but not yet for the particular phase indicated
