= 1947–48 Serie C =

The 1947–48 Serie C was the tenth edition of Serie C, the third highest league in the Italian football league system.

As the previous edition, it was divided into three independent leagues: the Northern, the Central and the Southern League. In order to reduce the number of teams in Serie B and Serie C, there were no promotions and most of the teams were relegated to the newly created Promozione, while the worst teams of every group would be relegated to Prima Divisione. Promozione would be organized by the three interregional leagues again, while the new Serie C will become the third division of the Football League.

== Legend ==
Relegated to Promozione
Relegated to Prima Divisione

== Northern Italy ==
The Central League was a championship with 144 clubs. All group winners would be promoted to the new Third Series of the Football League, while the last five clubs of each group would be relegated into the regional leagues.

In summer 1948 the FIGC decided that all the runners-up and some historically strongest followers would be admitted into the Football League, while only the last three clubs of each group would be relegated into the regional leagues.

=== Girone A ===
Pos	Team	Pld	Pts
1	Savona	30	52
2	Fossanese	30	43
3	Sanremese	30	42
4	Vado	30	39
5	Speranza Savona	30	30
6	Imperia	30	30
7	Acqui	30	29
8	Canelli (D)	30	28
9	Saviglianese	30	27
10	Cuneo	30	27
11	Cairese	30	27
12	Albenga	30	27
13	Alessio	30	24
14	Braidese	30	23
15	Saluzzo	30	17
16	Monregalese	30	15

(D) Disbanded after the end of the season.

=== Girone B ===
Pos	Team	Pld	Pts
1	Sestri Levante	30	42
2	Sestrese	30	42
3	Lavagnese	30	40 (Note: Lavagnese renounced to play in the new Serie C and was relegated in place of Pavia.)
4	Pavia	30	38
5	Corniglianese	30	37
6	Pontedecimo	30	34
7	Rivarolese	30	32
8	Borgatarese	30	31
9	Bolzantese Virtus	30	31
10	Varazze	30	30
11	Rapallo Ruentes	30	30
12	Sarzanese	30	27
13	Entella	30	27
14	Derthona (Note: Re-admitted into the League instead of Canelli for longtime activity.)	30	18 (Note: 1 point deducted.)
15	Quarto	30	10
16	Bressana	30	10

=== Girone C ===
Pos	Team	Pld	Pts
1	Biellese	30	48
2	Asti	30	48
3	Omegna	30	43
4	Rivarolo	30	35
5	Verbania	30	34
6	Sommese	30	31
7	Stella Alpina	30	30
8	Pinerolo	30	29
9	Luino	30	28 (Note: 1 point deducted.)
10	Angerese	30	28
11	Gattinara	30	26
12	Volpianese (B)	30	24
13	Juventus Domo (B)	30	23
14	Borgomanerese (Note: Re-admitted into the League instead of Volpianese.)	30	20
15	Aosta (Note: Re-admitted into the League instead of Juve Domo.)	30	17
16	Ivrea	30	14

(B) Went bankrupt

=== Girone D ===
Pos	Team	Pld	Pts
1	Casale	30	49
2	Mortara	30	46
3	Codogno	30	42
4	Garlasco	30	33
5	Corsico	30	32
6	Trinese	30	32
7	Fidenza	30	31
8	Stradellina	30	30
9	Cuggionese	30	29
10	Medese (B)	30	26
11	Sant'Angelo	30	26
12	Abbiategrasso	30	24
13	Olubra	30	22
14	Casteggio (Note: Re-admitted into the League instead of Medese.)	30	22
15	Pirelli	30	20
16	Fiorenzuola	30	16

(B) Went bankrupt

=== Girone E ===
Pos	Team	Pld	Pts
1	Parabiago	30	47
2	Pro Lissone	30	44
3	Vis Nova Giussano	30	41
4	Lecco	30	37
5	Biumense	30	34
6	Saronno	30	33
7	Meda	30	32
8	Cantù	30	31
9	Mariano Comense	30	30
10	Tiranese	30	27
11	Olginatese	30	25
12	Rhodense	30	25
13	Caratese	30	23
14	Esperia-Fino (D)	30	21
15	Vis Casatese	30	17
16	Sondrio (Note: Re-admitted into the League instead of ROL Milan.)	30	13

(D) Disbanded after this season.

=== Girone F ===
Pos	Team	Pld	Pts
1	Pro Palazzolo	30	47
2	Monza	30	42
3	Vimercatese	30	37
4	Chiari	30	37
5	Bagnolese	30	36
6	Trevigliese	30	34
7	Soresinese	30	30
8	Sebinia Lovere	30	30
9	Melzo	30	28
10	R.O.L. Milan (B)	30	28
11	Falck	30	28
12	Cologno Monz. (B)	30	24
13	Ardens	30	24
14	Pro Romano	30	23
15	Orceana	30	21
16	Cassano d'Adda	30	10 (Note: 1 point deducted.)

(B) Went bankrupt

=== Girone G ===
Pos	Team	Pld	Pts
1	Pro Rovigo	30	45
2	Marzotto	30	44
3	Pellizzari Arzignano	30	41
4	Badia Polesine	30	36
5	Audace San Michele	30	35
6	Rovereto	30	33
7	Lanerossi Schio	30	32
8	Legnago	30	31
9	Thiene	30	30
10	Trento	30	27
11	Merano	30	24
12	Villafranca (B)	30	21
13	Montagnana (Note: Montagnana was relegated to Prima Divisione after a tie-breaker with Sambonifacese (Montagnana-Sambonifacese 2-3), but was later admitted to Promozione after Villafranca renounced.)	30	21
14	Sambonifacese	30	20
15	Malo	30	13
16	Cologna Veneta	30	28 (Note: Cologna Veneta was demoted to the last place because of incidents in the match Cologna Veneta-Marzotto.)

(B) Went bankrupt

=== Girone H ===
Pos	Team	Pld	Pts
1	Mestrina	30	49
2	Montebelluna	30	40
3	Vittorio Veneto	30	37
4	Sandonà	30	36
5	Belluno	30	34
6	Bassano	30	34
7	Dolo	30	34
8	Portogruarese	30	32
9	Giorgione	30	31
10	Miranese	30	29
11	Luparense	30	29
12	San Marco Venezia	30	27
13	Conegliano	30	26
14	Pro Mogliano	30	19
15	Pordenone	30	17
16	Feltrese	30	6

=== Girone I ===
Pos	Team	Pld	Pts
1	Edera	30	48
2	Libertas Trieste	30	45
3	Ponziana	30	37
4	Sangiorgina	30	33
5	Cormonese	30	32
6	Monfalconese	30	32
7	SAICI Torviscosa	30	30
8	Palmanova	30	29
9	Sant'Anna	30	29
10	Sanvitese	30	28
11	Cividalese	30	28
12	Pro Cervignano	30	27
13	San Giovanni Trieste	30	21
14	Itala Gradisca	30	21
15	Fiumicello	30	21
16	Ronchi	30	14

== Central Italy ==
The Central League was a championship with 96 clubs. All group winners and best runners-up would be promoted to the new Third Series of the Football League, while the last five clubs of each group would be relegated into the regional leagues.

In summer 1948 the FIGC decided that all the runners-up and some historically strongest followers would be admitted into the Football League, while best clubs relegated into the regional leagues could pay a re-admittance into the Central League.

=== Girone A ===
Pos	Team	Pld	Pts
1	Baracca Lugo	30	48
2	Bondenese	30	43
3	Vignolese	30	37
4	Salsomaggiore	30	34
5	Pro Italia Correggio (B)	30	33
6	Altedo	30	32
7	Finale Emilia (B)	30	31
8	G. Buscaroli Conselice	30	30
9	Copparese (B)	30	28
10	Panigale (B)	30	28
11	Gonzaga (Note: Gonzaga won a relegation tie-break against Ferrovieri, but they later financially collapsed.) (B)	30	27
12	Ferrovieri Bologna	30	27
13	Ostiglia (B)	30	25
14	Mirandolese	30	23
15	Parma Vecchia	30	22 (Note: 1 point deducted.)
16	Carpi	30	13

(B) Went bankrupt

=== Girone B ===
Pos	Team	Pld	Pts
1	Rimini	30	47
2	Cesena	30	46
3	Vis Sauro Pesaro	30	37
4	Fano	30	36
5	Forlì	30	33
6	Ravenna	30	33
7	Forlimpopoli	30	30
8	Riccione	30	30
9	Vigor Senigallia	30	30
10	Jesina	30	26
11	Russi	30	25
12	Recanatese (B)	30	24
13	Imolese	30	22
14	Minat. Perticara (Note: Re-admitted into the league.)	30	22
15	Sammaurese	30	19 (Note: 1 point deducted.)
16	Faenza	30	17

(B) Went bankrupt

=== Girone C ===
Pos	Team	Pld	Pts
1	Arezzo	30	41
2	Vigor Fucecchio (Note: Fucecchio won a promotion tie-breaker against Monsummanese. However, they both were later admitted into the Football League by the FIGC.)	30	37
3	Monsummanese	30	37
4	Montevarchi	30	33
5	Poggibonsi	30	31 (Note: 1 point deducted.)
6	Signe	30	31
7	Sangiovannese	30	31
8	Castelfiorentino	30	29
9	Pro Firenze (B)	30	29
10	Sestese	30	29
11	Aglianese	30	29
12	S. Croce sull'Arno	30	28
13	Colligiana	30	27
14	Montecatini (Note: Re-admitted into the league.)	30	24
15	Lanciotto	30	23
16	Orvietana	30	19

(B) Went bankrupt

=== Girone D ===
Pos	Team	Pld	Pts
1	Piombino	30	41
2	Grosseto	30	39
3	Massese	30	38
4	Solvay	30	37
5	Pontedera	30	35
6	Pietrasanta	30	31
7	Olbia (B)	30	29
8	Orbetello	30	29
9	Tuscania	30	29
10	Viterbese	30	28
11	Cecina	30	27
12	Follonica (B)	30	25
13	Aud. Ponsacco (B)	30	25 (Note: 1 point deducted.)
14	Cascina (Note: Re-admitted into the league.)	30	24
15	Pro Livorno	30	23
16	Forte dei M.	30	19

(B) Went bankrupt

=== Girone E ===
Pos	Team	Pld	Pts
1	Tivoli	30	45
2	Carbosarda (Note: Carbosarda won a promotion tournament against Civitavecchiese and San Lorenzo.)	30	38
3	Civitavecchiese	30	38
4	San Lorenzo	30	38
5	Ostiense	30	37
6	Stefer Roma	30	36
7	Alba Trastevere	30	31
8	La Pontina Latina	30	30
9	Poligrafico	30	30
10	Frosinone	30	29
11	Sora	30	29
12	Almascalera Roma	30	26
13	Civitacastellana (B)	30	20 (Note: 1 point deducted.)
14	Torres	30	19
15	Aurelia Roma	30	16
16	Tirreno Nettuno	30	15

(B) Went bankrupt

=== Girone F ===
Pos	Team	Pld	Pts
1	Maceratese	28	39
2	Sambenedettese	28	38
3	Virtus Spoleto	28	35
4	Forza e Coraggio	28	32
5	Teramo	28	31
6	Chieti	28	29
7	Vastese	28	28
8	Tolentino	28	28
9	Fermana	28	28
10	L'Aquila	28	27
11	Foligno	28	26
12	Ascoli	28	25
13	Sulmona	28	22
14	Lanciano (Note: Re-admitted into the league.)	28	18
15	Portocivitanovese	28	14
16	Giulianova	–	0 (Note: Giulianova disqualified from the championship and relegated to Prima Divisione because of incidents in the match with Fermana.)

== Southern Italy ==
The Southern League was a championship with 48 clubs. All group winners and best runners-up would be promoted to the new Third Series of the Football League, while the last five clubs of each group would be relegated into the regional leagues.

In summer 1948 the FIGC decided that all the runners-up and all third placed clubs and some historically strongest followers would be admitted into the Football League, while all clubs relegated into the regional leagues could pay a re-admittance into the Southern League.

=== Girone A ===
Pos	Team	Pld	Pts
1	Stabia	30	44
2	Benevento	30	41
3	Avellino	30	39
4	Frattese	30	38
5	Turris	30	31
6	Angri	30	31
7	Gragnano	30	29
8	Bagnolese	30	29
9	Pomigliano	30	28
10	Casertana	30	28
11	Ercolanese	30	27
12	Afragolese	30	26
13	Sangiuseppese (B)	30	25
14	Portici	30	24
15	Sorrento	30	22
16	S.E.T. Napoli	30	18

(B) Went bankrupt

=== Girone B ===
Pos	Team	Pld	Pts
1	Foggia	26	42
2	Catanzaro	26	38
3	Crotone	26	35
4	Incedit Foggia	26	32
5	San Severo	26	27
6	Potenza	26	26 (Note: Potenza was relegated and later readmitted to Serie C.)
7	Biscegliese	26	24
8	San Pietro Vernotico	26	22
9	Audace Monopoli	26	21
10	Vigor Nicastro	26	21
11	Barletta	26	20
12	Molfetta	26	20
13	Castellana (B)	26	19
14	Buffoluto (B)	26	17
15	Azzar. Carbonara	–	0 (Note: Retired during the championship.)
16	Audace Ferdinando	–	0

(B) Went bankrupt

=== Girone C ===
Pos	Team	Pld	Pts
1	Catania	30	47
2	Reggina	30	46
3	Igea Barcellona	30	36
4	Arsenale Messina	30	34
5	Drepanum	30	34
6	Acireale	30	34
7	Messina	30	33
8	Marsala	30	31
9	Agrigento	30	30
10	Nissena	30	29
11	Gioiese	30	29
12	Cantieri Acquasanta	30	29 (Note: Cantieri Navali renounced to play in Prima Divisione and disbanded.)
13	Notinese	30	28
14	Megara Augusta (B)	30	21
15	Termini Imerese	30	14
16	Canicattì	30	5

(B) Went bankrupt
