= SS Alba-Audace Roma =

Italian football club

Alba-Audace
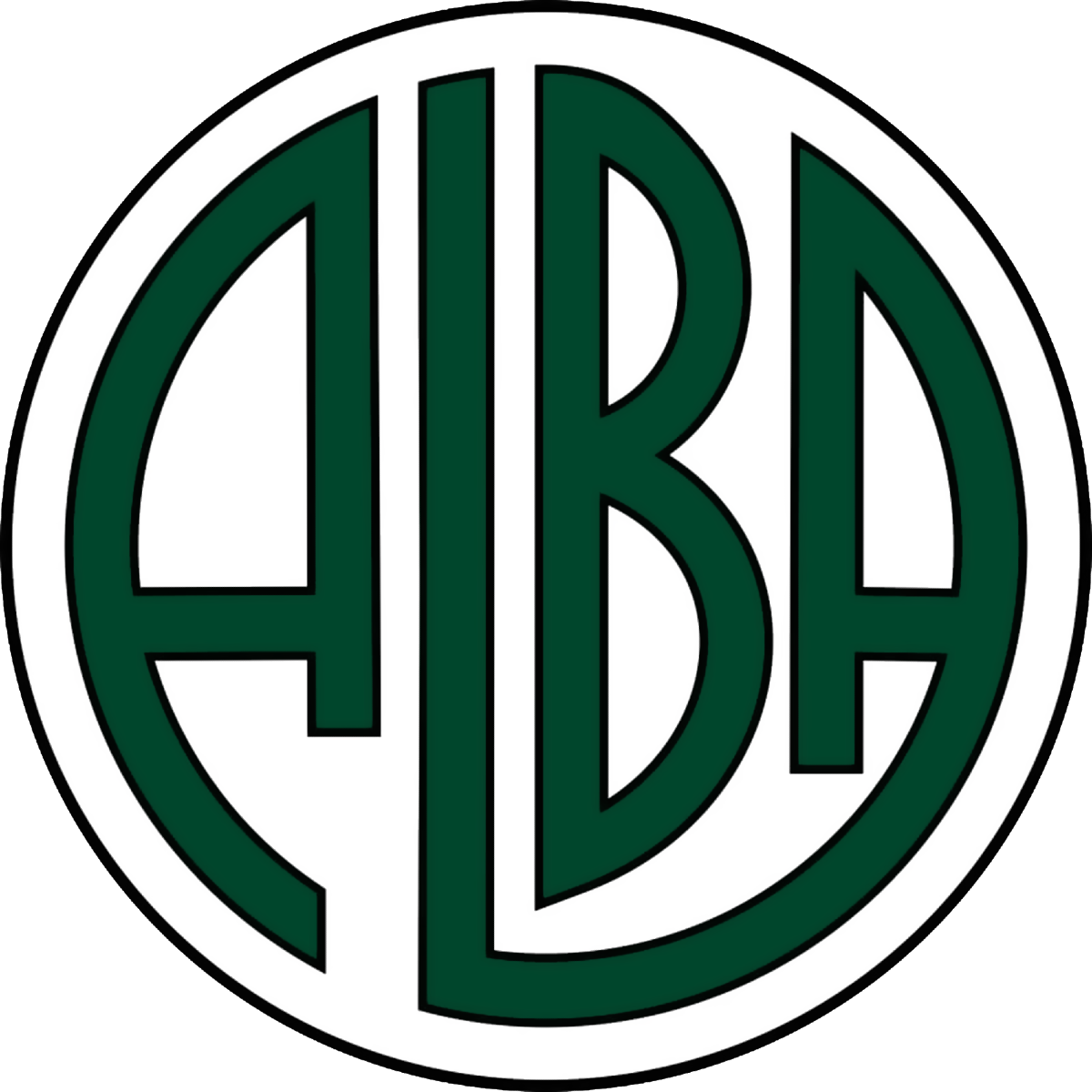
- Full name: Società Sportiva Alba-Audace
- Founded: 1907 (refounded in 1930)
- Dissolved: 7 June 1927 (1st creation); 1968 (2nd creation)
- Ground: Rome
- Capacity: unknown
- League: Italian Football Championship
- 1925–26: 2nd
| Home colours | Away colours |

Società Sportiva Alba-Audace was an Italian football club from the Flaminio area of Rome, founded in 1907. The club is most noted for competing in the early Italian Football Championship competitions, before becoming one of three Rome based clubs merging to form AS Roma in 1927.

== History ==
The club was founded in 1907 as Società Sportiva Alba and was owned for its known existence by a Roman named Umberto Farneti. Farneti owned some land in the Flaminio area of Rome, this is where the club would play and consider their home.

During the earliest days of the Italian Football Championship, only Northern Italian football clubs gained entry into the league so Alba had to wait until 1912–13 to make their championship debut. After qualifying for the Lazio section of the championship, Alba were forced to forfeit their fixtures.

At the end of 1925–26 season, the club was forced by the Fascist Regime to absorb another Roman club, Audace Roma, but retained its colors. After only one season, Alba-Audace was merged with Roman F.C. and Fortitudo-Pro Roma S.G.S. to form AS Roma.

The club briefly reformed in 1945 and, after merging with Trastevere Roma, took part to the 1946–47 Serie B season as Alba Trastevere before disbanding in late 1960s.

== Honours ==
Italian Football Championship:

- Southern Champions: 1924–25; 1925–26

== Historical names ==
- 1907 – S.S. Alba Roma (Società Sportiva Alba Roma)
- 1926 – fusion with Audace Roma => U.S. Alba-Audace Roma (Unione Sportiva Alba-Audace Roma)
- 1927 – folded after merging with Roman F.C. and Fortitudo-Pro Roma S.G.S.
- 1930 – refounded as A.S. Alba Roma (Associazione Sportiva Alba Roma)
- 1940 – A.S. Alba Motor Roma (Associazione Sportiva Alba Motor Roma)
- 1942 – A.S. Alba Roma (Associazione Sportiva Alba Roma)
- 1944 – Albaerotecnica Roma
- 1945 – A.S. Albala Roma (Associazione Sportiva Albala Roma)
- 1946 – fusion with Trastevere Roma => U.S. Albalatrastevere Roma (Unione Sportiva Albalatrastevere Roma)
- 1948 – U.S. Albatrastevere Roma (Unione Sportiva Albatrastevere Roma)
- 1968 – folded; refoundation of Trastevere Roma

== Season-by-season record ==
| Season | Division | Level | Position | Notes |
|---|---|---|---|---|
| 1912–13 | Prima Categoria Laziale | 1 | 6th | Do not advance to the final round |
...
| 1914–15 | Promozione Laziale | 1 | 2nd | Do not advance to the final round |
...
| 1920–21 | Promozione Laziale | 1 | 5th | Do not advance to the final round |
| 1921–22 | Lega Sud Laziale | 1 | 2nd | Do not advance to the final round |
| 1922–23 | Lega Sud, Semifinals Gr. A | 1 | 2nd | Do not advance to the final round |
| 1923–24 | Lega Sud, Finals | 1 | 2nd | Do not advance to the final round |
| 1924–25 | Lega Sud, Finals | 1 | 1st | Lost in national finals to Bologna |
| 1925–26 | Lega Sud, Finals | 1 | 1st | Lost in national finals to Juventus |
| 1926–27 | Divisione Nazionale, Gr. A | 1 | 9th | Disbanded |
...
| 1939–40 | Serie C, Gr. G | 3 | 13th | |
| 1940–41 | Serie C, Gr. G | 3 | 5th | |
| 1941–42 | Serie C, Gr. E | 3 | 2nd | |
| 1942–43 | Serie C, Gr. I | 3 | 2nd | |
...
| 1945–46 | Serie C, Gr. South C | 3 | 1st | Promotion |
| 1946–47 | Serie B, Gr. C | 2 | 14th | Relegated |
| 1947–48 | Serie C, Gr. Central E | 3 | 7th | Relegated |
