= Football in Southern Italy in 1920–21 =

Football in Southern Italy in 1920–21 was still organized at an experimental and amatorial level.

The tournaments were organized in three regions, Tuscany, Latium and Campania. Differently from the pre-war period, six clubs advanced to a general final tournament.

== Qualifications ==
=== Tuscany ===
==== Classification ====
Pos	Team	Pld	W	D	L	GF	GA	GD	Pts	Promotion or relegation
1	Pisa	14	12	1	1	40	11	+29	25	Qualified
2	Livorno	14	11	2	1	50	11	+39	24	Qualified
3	Lucca	14	8	2	4	31	20	+11	18	
4	Prato	14	7	0	7	21	22	−1	14	
5	CS Firenze	14	4	3	7	16	26	−10	11	
6	Libertas Firenze	14	4	2	8	19	20	−1	10	
7	Viareggio	14	1	3	10	21	48	−27	5	Relegation playoff
8	Giovanni Gerbi Pisa (R)	14	1	3	10	10	50	−40	5	Relegated

Source: Panini
(R) Relegated

==== Results table ====
Home \ Away	CSF	GER	LIB	LIV	LUC	PIS	PRA	VIA
CS Firenze	—	1–1	1–0	0–5	2–0 (Note: Forfeit)	1–5	0–2	4–2
Giovanni Gerbi Pisa	0–3	—	3–0	0–5	2–2	1–4	1–2	1–1
Libertas Firenze	0–0	8–0	—	2–4	0–1	2–4	2–0 (Note: Decided by the FIGC.)	0–0
Livorno	3–0	11–0	3–0	—	2–2	0–0	2–0	7–2
Lucca	2–0	3–0	1–0	0–3	—	2–5	3–2	11–1
Pisa	3–2	4–0	2–0	3–0	3–0	—	2–0	2–0
Prato	1–0	3–0	0–2	0–1	0–2	2–1	—	5–3
Viareggio	2–2	3–1	1–3	2–4	0–2	1–2	3–4	—

Legend: Blue = home team win; Yellow = draw; Red = away team win.
Notes:

Relegation playoff
Played on 25 June 1921 in Lucca.

Team 1	Score	Team 2
Viareggio	3–1	Gerbi Pisa

=== Lazio ===
==== Classification ====
Pos	Team	Pld	W	D	L	GF	GA	GD	Pts	Promotion or relegation
1	Fortitudo Roma	14	13	1	0	58	8	+50	27	Qualified
2	Lazio	14	10	2	2	45	12	+33	22	Qualified
3	Juventus Audax	14	8	1	5	41	18	+23	17	
4	Pro Roma	14	6	2	6	25	37	−12	14	
5	Audace Roma	14	5	1	8	30	34	−4	11	
6	US Romana	14	5	0	9	23	35	−12	10	
7	Vittoria Roma	14	2	3	9	12	45	−33	7	
8	Roman	14	1	2	11	13	59	−46	4	

==== Results table ====
Home \ Away	AUD	FOR	JUV	LAZ	PRO	ROM	USR	VIT
Audace Roma	—	1–4	1–2	0–9	1–2	3–0	4–0	5–0
Fortitudo Roma	6–3	—	3–0	1–1	4–2	11–0	4–0	4–0
Juventus Audax	2–2	1–3	—	3–0	8–1	9–0	6–2	1–2
Lazio	2–0	0–1	2–0	—	4–0	6–0	2–1	6–1
Pro Roma	4–1	0–6	1–0	2–5	—	4–0	1–2	2–1
Roman	1–6	0–1	1–2	1–5	3–3	—	1–2	1–1
US Romana	0–2	0–5	0–5	1–2	1–2	3–1	—	6–0
Vittoria Roma	2–1	0–5	0–3	1–1	1–1	3–4	0–5	—

Legend: Blue = home team win; Yellow = draw; Red = away team win.

=== Campania ===
==== Group A ====
Classification

Pos	Team	Pld	W	D	L	GF	GA	GD	Pts	Promotion or relegation
1	Puteolana	6	5	1	0	17	4	+13	11	Qualified
2	Naples	6	4	0	2	18	8	+10	8	Qualified
3	Savoia	6	2	1	3	8	21	−13	5	
4	Salernitana	6	0	0	6	1	11	−10	0	

Results table

Home \ Away	NAP	PUT	SAL	SAV
Naples	—	1–2	2–0 (Note: Forfeit)	4–2
Puteolana	3–1	—	2–1	7–0
Salernitana	0–1	0–2	—	0–2
Savoia	1–9	1–1	2–0	—

Legend: Blue = home team win; Yellow = draw; Red = away team win.

==== Group B ====
Classification

Pos	Team	Pld	W	D	L	GF	GA	GD	Pts	Promotion or relegation
1	Internazionale Napoli	6	4	1	1	13	5	+8	9	Qualified
1	Bagnolese	6	4	1	1	13	6	+7	9	Qualified
3	Pro Napoli (E)	6	3	0	3	10	6	+4	6	Disbanded
4	Audacia Napoli (E)	6	0	0	6	3	22	−19	0	Disbanded

(E) Eliminated

Results table

Home \ Away	AUD	BAG	INT	PRO
Audacia Napoli	—	0–3	0–6	1–4
Bagnolese	4–1	—	1–1	2–0
Internazionale Napoli	2–1	3–1	—	0–2
Pro Napoli	3–0	1–2	0–1	—

Legend: Blue = home team win; Yellow = draw; Red = away team win.

==== Final round ====
Classification

Pos	Team	Pld	W	D	L	GF	GA	GD	Pts	Promotion or relegation
1	Naples	6	3	1	2	8	7	+1	7	Qualified
2	Bagnolese	6	3	0	3	7	5	+2	6	Qualified
3	Internazionale Napoli	6	0	1	5	2	10	−8	1	
4	Puteolana	6	5	0	1	11	6	+5	10 (Note: Puteolana was demoted to the last place by the FIGC due to irregularities.)	

Notes:

Results table

Home \ Away	BAG	INT	NAP	PUT
Bagnolese	—	1–0	2–0	1–2
Internazionale Napoli	0–2 (Note: Forfeit)	—	1–2	1–3
Naples	2–1	0–0	—	2–0
Puteolana	1–0	2–0	3–2	—

Legend: Blue = home team win; Yellow = draw; Red = away team win.

== Semifinals ==
=== Group A ===
==== Classification ====
Pos	Team	Pld	W	D	L	GF	GA	GD	Pts	Promotion or relegation
1	Livorno	4	4	0	0	13	4	+9	8	Qualified
2	Naples	4	1	1	2	11	13	−2	3	
3	Lazio	4	0	1	3	7	14	−7	1	

==== Results table ====
Home \ Away	LAZ	LIV	NAP
Lazio	—	1–2	4–4
Livorno	4–0	—	5–2
Naples	4–2	1–2	—

Legend: Blue = home team win; Yellow = draw; Red = away team win.

=== Group B ===
==== Classification ====
Pos	Team	Pld	W	D	L	GF	GA	GD	Pts	Promotion or relegation
1	Pisa	4	3	1	0	13	2	+11	7	Qualified
2	Fortitudo Roma	4	2	1	1	11	3	+8	5	
3	Bagnolese	4	0	0	4	2	21	−19	0	

==== Results table ====
Home \ Away	BAG	FOR	PIS
Bagnolese	—	1–3	0–3
Fortitudo Roma	7–0	—	1–2
Pisa	8–1	0–0	—

Legend: Blue = home team win; Yellow = draw; Red = away team win.

== Final ==
Played on 3 July 1921 in Bologna.

Team 1	Score	Team 2
Livorno	0–1	Pisa

Livorno resigned from the FIGC.

== See also ==
- Football in Southern Italy in 1919–20
- 1921–22 Lega Sud
