= 1922–23 Lega Sud =

Lega Sud
- Season: 1922–23
- Champions: Lazio Rome

The Southern League was the amatorial football championship in Southern Italy during the 20's of the 20th century.

The 1922–23 season was the first one organized within the Italian Football Federation. The winner had the honor to play against the Northern Champions.

The League took over the former CCI Regional championship, maintaining the goal to improve the quality of the game in the area. Southern semifinals with six matchdays were introduced following the limitation of the regional phase to ten matchdays.

== Qualifications ==
=== Marche ===
Anconitana was the only subscribed team and advanced directly to the semifinals.

=== Lazio ===
==== Classification ====
P	Team	Pld	W	D	L	GF	GA	GD	Pts	Promotion or relegation
1.	Lazio	10	8	1	1	30	14	+16	17	Qualified
2.	Alba Roma	10	7	1	2	42	13	+29	15	Qualified
3.	Fortitudo Roma	10	5	1	4	20	18	+2	11	
4.	US Romana	10	3	1	6	12	21	-9	7	
5.	Juventus Audax	10	3	0	7	14	31	-17	6	
6.	Roman	10	2	0	8	7	28	-21	4	Relegated

==== Results table ====
Home \ Away	ALB	FOR	JUV	LAZ	ROM	USR
Alba Roma	—	3–1	11–0	2–7	4–1	3–0
Fortitudo Roma	3–2	—	3–1	0–3	2–0	2–2
Juventus Audax	0–2	2–5	—	2–3	3–1	3–2
Lazio	0–0	3–1	3–2	—	2–0	4–1
Roman	1–10	0–3	1–0	2–3	—	0–1
US Romana	0–5	2–0	0–1	4–2	0–1	—

Legend: Blue = home team win; Yellow = draw; Red = away team win.

=== Campania ===
==== Classification ====
P	Team	Pld	W	D	L	GF	GA	GD	Pts	Promotion or relegation
1.	Savoia	8	7	1	0	26	6	+20	15	Qualified
2.	Internaples	8	5	1	2	8	4	+4	11	Qualified
3.	Stabia	8	4	0	4	12	11	+1	8	
4.	Cavese	8	3	0	5	11	19	-8	6	
5.	Bagnolese	8	0	0	8	1	18	-17	0	
6.	Puteolana	0								Disbanded

Puteolana retired and disbanded.

==== Results table ====
Home \ Away	BAG	CAV	INT	SAV	STA
Bagnolese	—	0–1	0–2	0–2	0–2
Cavese	2–0	—	0–1	1–4	2–4
Internaples	1–0	1–2	—	0–0	1–0
Savoia	6–1	7–2	2–0	—	4–2
Stabia	2–0	2–1	0–2	0–1	—

Legend: Blue = home team win; Yellow = draw; Red = away team win.

=== Apulia ===
==== Classification ====
P	Team	Pld	W	D	L	GF	GA	GD	Pts	Promotion or relegation
1.	Pro Italia Taranto	8	6	1	1	25	7	+18	13	Qualified
2.	Ideale Bari	8	6	0	2	19	8	+11	12	Qualified
3.	Audace Taranto	8	3	3	2	15	11	+4	9	
4.	Liberty Bari	8	2	1	5	10	18	-8	5	
5.	Lecce	8	0	1	7	7	32	-25	1	Disbanded

==== Results table ====
Home \ Away	AUD	IDE	LEC	LIB	PRO
Audace Taranto	—	1–0	4–0	1–1	2–2
Ideale Bari	3–0	—	7–0	1–0	1–0
Lecce	2–2	2–4	—	1–4	1–4
Liberty Bari	1–4	1–3	2–0	—	1–4
Pro Italia Taranto	2–1	4–0	5–1	4–0	—

Legend: Blue = home team win; Yellow = draw; Red = away team win.

=== Sicily ===
A previous qualification tournament, with home and away matches, started without FIGC's permission and was declared void. Anyway, the three sides had ended the tournament with 2 points each.

==== Classification ====
P	Team	Pld	W	D	L	GF	GA	GD	Pts	Promotion or relegation
1.	Libertas Palermo	2	2	0	0	3	0	+3	4	Qualified
2.	Messina	2	1	0	1	2	1	+1	2	
3.	Palermo	2	0	0	2	0	4	-4	0	

==== Results ====
Team 1	Score	Team 2
Libertas Palermo	1-0	Messina
Libertas Palermo	2-0	Palermo
Messina	2-0	Palermo

== Semifinals ==
=== Group A ===
Pro Italia Taranto had to retire from the championship due to lack of players: most of the players were soldiers and Taranto's military command denied them to play in this tournament and against civilian sides again.

==== Classification ====
P	Team	Pld	W	D	L	GF	GA	GD	Pts	Promotion or relegation
1.	Savoia	6	4	2	0	11	3	+8	10	Qualified
2.	Alba Roma	6	3	1	2	8	5	+3	7	
2.	Anconitana	6	3	1	2	10	9	+1	7	
4.	Pro Italia Taranto	6	0	0	6	0	12	-12	0	Retired

==== Results table ====
Home \ Away	ALB	ANC	PRO	SAV
Alba Roma	—	4–1	2–0	0–0
Anconitana	2–0	—	2–0	0–2
Pro Italia Taranto	0–2	0–2	—	0–2
Savoia	2–0	3–3	2–0	—

Legend: Blue = home team win; Yellow = draw; Red = away team win.

=== Group B ===
==== Classification ====
P	Team	Pld	W	D	L	GF	GA	GD	Pts	Promotion or relegation
1.	Lazio	6	6	0	0	29	4	+25	12	Qualified
2.	Ideale Bari	6	4	0	2	8	11	-3	8	
3.	Libertas Palermo	6	2	0	4	10	20	-10	4	Merged with Palermo
4.	Internaples	6	0	0	6	2	14	-12	0	

==== Results table ====
Home \ Away	IDE	INT	LAZ	LIB
Ideale Bari	—	1–0	0–3	3–2
Internaples	0–2	—	0–3	1–2
Lazio	6–0	4–0	—	10–2
Libertas Palermo	0–2	2–1	2–3	—

Legend: Blue = home team win; Yellow = draw; Red = away team win.

== Finals ==
Team 1	Agg.	Team 2	1st leg	2nd leg
Savoia	2–7 (agg.)	Lazio	3–3	1–4
