= 1942–43 Serie C =

Italian football league season

The 1942–43 Serie C was the eighth edition of Serie C, the third highest league in the Italian football league system.

== Legend ==
Promoted
Relegated

The fascists ordered to continue the ordinary sport activity to give a false sensation of normality despite the recrudescence of WW2. More clubs were added to Serie C. However, pending the reality, teams were distributed in smaller more groups to reduce travel distances and the number of matchdays.

== Girone A ==
Pos	Team	Pld	Pts
1	Pro Gorizia	22	35
2	Treviso (S)	22	34
3	94° Reparto Distretto Trieste (E)	22	30
4	Fiumana (J)	22	30
5	Grion Pola (J)	22	28
6	Ponziana	22	23
7	CRDA Monfalcone	22	20
8	Vittorio Veneto	22	20
9	Ampelea Isola d'Istria	22	19
10	Magazzini Generali Fiume (J)	22	19
11	Pieris	22	8
12	GIL Mogliano	22	4

Source: Panini
(E) Eliminated; (J) ?; (S) ?

== Group B ==
Pos	Team	Pld	Pts
1	Verona (A)	22	35
2	Ferrara (S)	22	32
3	Mantova (S)	22	30
4	Corradini Suzzara (S)	22	27
5	Caproni Trento (S)	22	26
6	Bassano	22	33
7	Lanerossi Schio	22	22
8	Audace San Michele	22	19
9	Mestre	22	14
10	Rovigo	22	14
11	DAM Valdagno (T)	22	12
12	Arzignano (T, B)	22	10

Source: Panini
(A) Advance to a further round; (B) Given a break due to suffering huge war damages; (S) Selected for 1945–46 Serie B-C; (T) Qualified, but not yet for the particular phase indicated

== Group C ==
Pos	Team	Pld	Pts
1	Lecco (A)	24	42
2	Como (S)	24	38
3	Crema (S)	24	34
4	Falck Sesto S.G. (S, Z)	24	31
5	Breda Sesto S.G.	24	28
6	Seregno (S)	24	27
7	Gerli Cusano Milanino	24	26
8	Meda	24	22
9	Monza	24	17
10	Pro Lissone	24	15
11	Cantù (T)	24	15
12	Vis Nova Giussano (T)	24	10
13	Caratese (T)	24	5

Source: Panini
(A) Advance to a further round; (S) Selected for 1945–46 Serie B-C; (T) Qualified, but not yet for the particular phase indicated; (Z) Split. Main becomes Pro Sesto. Minority creates a phoenix

Tie-breaker: Lissone-Cantù 2-0

== Girone D ==
Pos	Team	Pld	Pts
1	Varese	24	40
2	Vigevano (S)	24	35
3	Legnano (S)	24	34
4	Gallaratese (S)	24	33
5	Abbiategrasso (W)	24	29
6	Pavia	24	28
7	VISA Voghera (S)	24	27
8	Redaelli Rogoredo	24	21
9	Juventus Domo	24	19
10	Saronno	24	18
11	Caproni Milano	24	17
12	Pirelli Milano	24	10
13	Sparta Novara	24	3 (Note: 1 point deducted.)

Source: Panini
(S) ?; (W) ?

== Girone E ==
Pos	Team	Pld	Pts
1	Biellese	20	37
2	Pro Vercelli (S)	20	30
3	Cuneo (S)	20	28
4	Casale (S)	20	24
5	Savigliano	20	23
6	Sanremese	20	23
7	Settimese	20	20
8	Ivrea	20	20
9	Aosta	20	19
10	Cinzano	20	17
11	Acqui	20	16
12	Asti	–	0 (Note: Retired during the championship. All their matches were voided.)

(S) ?

== Girone F ==
Pos	Team	Pld	Pts
1	Carrarese	22	28
2	Pontedera	22	25
3	Cavagnaro Genova–Sestri (S)	22	23
4	Ilva Novi Ligure (W)	22	23
5	Dop. Spezia (Z)	22	23
6	Entella	22	22
7	Forte dei Marmi	22	20
8	SGEM Villafranca Lunigiana	22	18
9	Derthona	22	15
10	Empoli	22	14 (Note: 1 point deducted.)
11	Rapallo	22	8
12	Cecina	22	6

Source: Panini
(S) ?; (W) ?; (Z) ?

== Girone G ==
Pos	Team	Pld	Pts
1	Parma	18	35
2	Reggiana (S)	18	27
3	Panigale (S)	18	27
4	Prato	18	26
5	Trancerie Mossina	18	18
6	Carpi	18	18
7	Piacenza (S)	18	13
8	Imolese	18	12
9	Codogno	18	11
10	Budrio	18	7
11	Amatori Bologna	–	0 (Note: Retired during the championship. All their matches were voided.)
12	Baracca Lugo	–	0

(S) ?

== Girone H ==
Pos	Team	Pld	Pts
1	Forlì	22	34
2	Ascoli	22	31
3	Chieti	22	31
4	Vis Pesaro	22	24
5	Cesena (S)	22	23
6	Fano	22	23
7	Forlimpopoli	22	20
8	Maceratese	22	20
9	Rimini	22	20
10	Ravenna	22	19
11	Cluana Civitanova M.	22	10
12	Andreanelli Ancona (E)	22	9

Source: Panini
(E) Eliminated; (S) ?

== Girone I ==
Pos	Team	Pld	Pts
1	Borzacchini Terni	24	39
2	Alba Motor Roma	24	37
3	Ala Littoria Roma (Note: Later merged with Alba Rome.) (E)	24	33
4	Perugia	24	32
5	AUSA Foligno	24	27
6	Signe	24	26
7	Sangiovannese	24	21
8	Grosseto	24	19
9	Arezzo	24	18
10	Orbetello	24	18
11	L'Aquila	24	17
12	Virtus Spoleto	24	17
13	Aquila Montevarchi	24	6

Source: Panini
(E) Eliminated

== Girone L ==
Pos	Team	Pld	Pts
1	Salernitana	22	34
2	Baratta Battipaglia	22	28
3	Savoia	22	27
4	Littorio Roma	22	25
5	V.V.F. Roma	22	25
6	Bagnolese	22	25
7	Scafatese	22	24 (Note: 1 point deducted.)
8	Cavese	22	21
9	BPD Colleferro	22	20
10	Stabia	22	20
11	Casertana	22	7
12	Civitavecchiese	22	6

== Girone M ==
Pos	Team	Pld	Pts
1	Lecce	22	35
2	Taranto	22	32
3	Cosenza	22	31
4	Foggia	22	27
5	Aviocalcio Bari–Palese	22	24
6	Pietro Resta Taranto	22	23
7	Aviosquadra Gioia del Colle	22	21
8	Brindisi	22	20
9	Molfetta	22	19
10	Trani	22	14
11	Lucana Potenza	22	11
12	Barletta	22	7

== Girone N ==
Pos	Team	Pld	Pts
1	Catania	18	31
2	Siracusa	18	23 (Note: 1 point deducted.)
3	V.V.F. Palermo	18	22
4	Enna	18	14
5	Passamonte Messina	18	12
6	Marinai d'Italia Marsala	18	11
7	Agrigento	18	11
8	Juventus Trapani	18	10
9	GIL Siderno	18	4
10	Nissena	18	0 (Note: 2 points deducted.)

== Final rounds ==
=== Girone A ===
Pos	Team	Pld	Pts
1	Varese (B)	8	11
2	Salernitana (P)	8	10
3	Borzacchini Terni	8	9
4	Biellese (S)	8	8
5	Forlì (S)	8	2
6	Catania	–	0 (Note: Catania had to retire before of the start of the Final Round because of the American debarkation in Sicily, and later folded for bankruptcy.)

Source: Panini
(B) Promoted in 1946; (P) Promoted; (S) Selected after the war

=== Girone B ===
Pos	Team	Pld	Pts
1	Pro Gorizia (P)	10	15
2	Verona (P)	10	13
3	Lecce	10	12
4	Lecco (S)	10	5
5	Carrarese	10	2
6	Parma (S)	10	13 (Note: Put in the last place because of a sport illicit.)

Source: Panini
(P) Promoted; (S) Selected after the war

== After the war ==
At the end of this season the championship was suspended due to World War II. After the war, the devastation left by the battles on the Gothic Line made travels from one side of the Apennines to the other very difficult. More, Northern Italy was occupied by the US Army under the separate administration of the AMGOT. The championship was restarted in 1945 with a transitory season where northern and southern sides took part in nearly separated competitions. For these reasons, the championship composition was deeply changed.

=== Northern sides ===
- All the sides that took part in the Final rounds were arbitrary promoted to 1945–46 Serie B-C with the exception of Varese that asked to take part to the regional leagues because its home stadium was destroyed by bombardment.
- Other 22 sides were promoted by the FIGC considering final placing, financial situation, previous sport merits, geographical representation, and, last but not least, if they had suffered wrongs made by the Fascist regime.
  - Girone A: Treviso
  - Girone B: Ferrara (later renamed back SPAL), Mantova, Suzzara and Trento
  - Girone C: Como, Crema, Seregno and the reborn Pro Sesto, that later absorbed the clubs Falck Sesto San Giovanni and Giovani Calciatori Sestesi.
  - Girone D: Gallaratese, Legnano, Vigevano and Vogherese
  - Girone E: Casale, Cuneo and Pro Vercelli
  - Girone F: Manlio Cavagnaro Sestri (later renamed back Sestrese) and Dopolavoro/Ausonia Spezia
  - Girone G: Panigale, Piacenza and Reggiana
  - Girone H: Cesena
- Istrian sides had to leave the league after annexation of the region by Yugoslavia. The teams from Rijeka/Fiume, Pula/Pola, and later Izola/Isola d'Istria were integrated in an Istrian tournament in 1945 and in the Yugoslav pyramid in 1946.
- All the relegations obtained on the pitch were cancelled, let alone cases of financial difficulties or dissolution.

=== Southern sides ===
- Salernitana, promoted to Serie B at the end of the season, was admitted directly to 1945–46 Serie A-B.
- All the other teams were admitted to 1945–46 Serie C's Southern league, let alone sides with financial difficulties.
- In 1946, for equity, even the survived Southern finalists of this championship were admitted to Serie B.
