= 1921–22 Lega Sud =

Lega Sud
- Season: 1921–22 (CCI)
- Champions: Fortitudo Rome

The Southern League was the amatorial football championship in Southern Italy during the 1920s.

The 1921–22 season was the inaugural one of the rebranded league, organized within the Italian Football Confederation. The winner had the honor to play against the Northern Champions.

The League took over the former FIGC Regional championship to improve their quality, adding new regions as Apulia, Sicily and the Marches. As the first step, the League decided to reduce the regional tournaments to ten matchdays for 1922–23 to improve the inter-league playoffs.

== Qualifications ==
=== Lazio ===
Tiberis Roma and Vittoria Roma were excluded after 5 rounds, due to irregularities in their subscriptions.

These matches were invalidated:

Team 1	Score	Team 2
Juventus Audax	4–0	Vittoria Roma
Fortitudo Roma	4–1	Tiberis Roma
Alba Roma	17-0	Tiberis Roma
U.S. Romana	7–0	Vittoria Roma
Fortitudo Roma	5–0	Vittoria Roma
Audace Roma	8–0	Tiberis Roma
Alba Roma	5–0	Vittoria Roma
Vittoria Roma	0–1	Tiberis Roma

==== Classification ====
P	Team	Pld	W	D	L	GF	GA	GD	Pts	Promotion or relegation
1.	Fortitudo Roma	16	13	2	1	35	10	+25	28	Qualified
2.	Alba Roma	16	11	2	3	38	13	+25	24	
3.	Juventus Audax	16	8	4	4	45	26	+19	20	
3.	Lazio	16	8	4	4	37	22	+15	20	
5.	US Romana	16	5	4	7	24	29	-5	14	
6.	Roman	16	4	4	8	24	39	-15	12	
7.	Audace Roma	16	4	4	8	32	42	-10	12	Relegated
8.	Pro Roma	16	2	4	10	15	37	-22	8	Relegated
9.	Tivoli	16	2	2	12	20	52	-32	6	Relegated
10.	Tiberis Roma									Relegated
11.	Vittoria Roma									Merged with Tiberis

==== Results table ====
Home \ Away	ALB	AUD	FOR	JUV	LAZ	PRO	ROM	TIV	USR
Alba Roma	—	7–2	0–1	6–0	1–0	2–0	3–0	2–0	4–1
Audace Roma	1–3	—	1–3	2–4	2–2	4–0	5–1	6–0	3–9
Fortitudo Roma	1–0	4–0	—	3–0	2–1	3–0	3–1	3–0	1–1
Juventus Audax	0–0	2–2	0–2	—	1–2	3–1	8–2	7–1	0–0
Lazio	5–2	2–3	5–2	1–1	—	6–1	1–0	1–1	3–2
Pro Roma	1–1	1–1	0–2	0–3	0–3	—	2–1	4–1	1–1
Roman	1–3	0–0	1–1	2–3	1–1	2–1	—	3–1	1–1
Tivoli	0–2	3–0	0–1	2–9	1–3	3–3	4–5	—	0–2
US Romana	0–2	1–0	0–3	0–4	2–1	1–0	2–3	1–3	—

Legend: Blue = home team win; Yellow = draw; Red = away team win.

Relegation tie-breaker in Rome, July 2, 1922: Roman-Audace 2–1.

=== Marche ===
Football was activated in the Marches in this season.

==== Group A ====
Classification

P	Team	Pld	W	D	L	GF	GA	GD	Pts	Promotion or relegation
1.	Helvia Recina	4	4	0	0	11	5	+6	8	Qualified
2.	Macerata	4	2	0	2	9	5	+4	4	Qualified
3.	Virtus Macerata	4	0	0	4	2	12	-10	0	Merged

Later all clubs merged into new A.C. Maceratese.

Results table

Home \ Away	HEL	MAC	VIR
Helvia Recina	—	2–1	4–2
Macerata	2–3	—	4–0
Virtus Macerata	0–2	0–2	—

Legend: Blue = home team win; Yellow = draw; Red = away team win.

==== Group B ====
Classification

P	Team	Pld	W	D	L	GF	GA	GD	Pts	Promotion or relegation
1.	Anconitana	4	4	0	0	18	2	+16	8	Qualified
2.	Vigor Senigallia	4	2	0	2	4	8	-4	4	Qualified
3.	Folgore Ancona	4	0	0	4	4	16	-12	0	Merged

Later Folgore merged with A.C. Ancona.

Results table

Home \ Away	ANC	FOL	VIG
Anconitana	—	5–0	5–0
Folgore Ancona	2–7	—	1–2
Vigor Senigallia	0–1	2–1	—

Legend: Blue = home team win; Yellow = draw; Red = away team win.

==== Final round ====
The results of the matches between sides that were in the same qualification round were valid also for the final round (but not the goals scored in those matches). Due to this, Anconitana and Helvia Recina started the round with a 4-point bonus.

Classification

P	Team	Pld	W	D	L	GF	GA	GD	Pts	Promotion or relegation
1.	Anconitana	4	4	0	0	18	2	+16	12	Qualified
2.	Vigor Senigallia	4	3	1	0	13	6	+7	7	Eliminated, activated 2nd Division
3.	Helvia Recina	4	0	0	4	3	10	-7	4	Eliminated, activated 2nd Division
4.	Macerata	4	0	1	3	6	16	-10	1	Merged

Results table

Home \ Away	ANC	HEL	MAC	VIG
Anconitana	—	2–0	5–0	—
Helvia Recina	1–2	—	—	1–2
Macerata	2–4	—	—	2–5
Vigor Senigallia	—	4–1	2–2	—

Legend: Blue = home team win; Yellow = draw; Red = away team win.

=== Campania ===
==== Classification ====
P	Team	Pld	W	D	L	GF	GA	GD	Pts	Promotion or relegation
1.	Puteolana	12	12	0	0	34	3	+31	24	Qualified
2.	Savoia	12	9	0	3	40	14	+26	18	
3.	Internazionale Napoli	12	5	2	5	13	16	-3	12	
4.	Naples	12	5	1	6	15	23	-8	11	Merged with InterNapoli
5.	Bagnolese	12	3	4	5	13	24	-11	10	
6.	Stabia	12	4	1	7	14	24	-10	9	
7.	Salernitana	12	0	0	12	4	29	-25	0	Relegated

==== Results table ====
Home \ Away	BAG	INT	NAP	PUT	SAL	SAV	STA
Bagnolese	—	1–1	0–0	0–3	2–1	0–8	1–1
Internazionale Napoli	0–0	—	1–0	0–3	2–0	2–0	2–0
Naples	0–2	4–1	—	0–4	2–0	1–4	2–1
Puteolana	4–0	1–0	3–1	—	2–0	5–1	3–0
Salernitana	0–3	1–3	1–2	0–2	—	0–2	0–4
Savoia	3–2	5–1	5–1	0–1	3–1	—	6–0
Stabia	3–2	1–0	1–2	1–3	2–0	0–3	—

Legend: Blue = home team win; Yellow = draw; Red = away team win.

=== Apulia ===
==== Classification ====
P	Team	Pld	W	D	L	GF	GA	GD	Pts	Promotion or relegation
1.	Audace Taranto	6	4	1	1	16	7	+9	9	Qualified
2.	Pro Italia Taranto	6	3	2	1	11	6	+5	8	
3.	Liberty Bari	6	2	2	2	13	8	+5	6	
4.	Veloce Taranto	6	0	1	5	1	20	-19	1	Relegated

==== Results table ====
Home \ Away	AUD	LIB	PRO	VEL
Audace Taranto	—	3–1	2–1	4–1
Liberty Bari	2–0	—	1–1	8–0
Pro Italia Taranto	2–2	4–1	—	1–0
Veloce Taranto	0–5	0–0	0–2	—

Legend: Blue = home team win; Yellow = draw; Red = away team win.

=== Sicily ===
Azzurra Palermo and US Catanese were excluded before the start of the championship.

Libertas Palermo, SC Messina and Vigor Trapani retired during the championship and all their remaining matches were considered forfeits.

==== Classification ====
P	Team	Pld	W	D	L	GF	GA	GD	Pts	Promotion or relegation
1.	Palermo	10	10	0	0	37	5	+32	20	Qualified
2.	Libertas Palermo	10	6	0	4	18	16	+2	12	
3.	Messinese	10	4	2	4	31	19	+12	10	
4.	Umberto I Messina	10	4	2	4	12	21	-9	10	Merged with major clubs
5.	SC Messina	10	3	2	5	16	22	-6	8	Merged with major clubs
6.	Vigor Trapani	10	0	0	10	3	34	-31	0	Merged with major clubs

==== Results table ====
Home \ Away	LIB	MES	PAL	SCM	UMB	VIG
Libertas Palermo	—	3–1	0–2	0–2	2–1	2–0
Messinese	2–4	—	1–2	7–3	9–0	2–0
Palermo	2–0	2–0	—	4–1	5–0	12–0
SC Messina	2–4	2–2	2–3	—	0–0	2–0
Umberto I Messina	2–0	2–2	1–3	2–0	—	2–0
Vigor Trapani	2–3	1–5	0–2	0–2	0–2	—

Legend: Blue = home team win; Yellow = draw; Red = away team win.

== Finals ==
=== Round 1 ===
Played on May 14, 1922, in Rome.

Team 1	Score	Team 2
Puteolana	3-0	Anconitana

Played on May 21, 1922, in Torre Annunziata.

Team 1	Score	Team 2
Audace Taranto	1-0	Palermo

=== Round 2 ===
Played on May 28, 1922, in Torre Annunziata.

Team 1	Score	Team 2
Fortitudo Roma	4-9	Audace Taranto

Audace Taranto retired before the end of the match.

=== Round 3 ===
Played on June 4, 1922, in Rome.

Team 1	Score	Team 2
Fortitudo Roma	2-0	Puteolana

Puteolana folded after the match.
