= 1923–24 Lega Sud =

Lega Sud
- Season: 1923–24
- Champions: Savoia

The Southern League was the amatorial football championship in Southern Italy during the 20's of the 20th century.

The 1923–24 season was organized within the Italian Football Federation. The winner had the honor to play against the Northern Champions.

The League maintained the goal to improve the quality of the game in the area. Southern semifinals with six matchdays followed the regional phase of ten matchdays.

== Qualifications ==
=== Marche ===
Anconitana was the only registered team and advanced directly Southern Italy Semifinals.

=== Lazio ===
==== Classification ====
P	Team	Pld	W	D	L	GF	GA	GD	Pts	Promotion or relegation
1.	Alba Roma	10	7	2	1	27	9	+18	16	Qualified
2.	Lazio	10	7	1	2	39	11	+28	15	Tie-breaker
3.	Fortitudo Roma	10	7	1	2	20	5	+15	15	Tie-breaker
4.	Tivoli	10	4	0	6	17	20	-3	8	Relegated by the FIGC
5.	US Romana	10	3	0	7	10	33	-13	6	Became "Pro Roma"
6.	Juventus Audax	10	0	0	10	4	39	-35	0	Merged with Fortitudo

==== Results table ====
Home \ Away	ALB	FOR	JUV	LAZ	TIV	USR
Alba Roma	—	1–1	2–0	2–2	4–0	2–0
Fortitudo Roma	2–0	—	1–0	0–3	1–0	4–0
Juventus Audax	2–6	0–5	—	0–6	0–2	1–4
Lazio	2–4	1–0	8–1	—	4–1	5–0
Tivoli	0–2	0–4	4–0	2–1	—	6–1
US Romana	0–4	0–2	1–0	1–7	3–2	—

Legend: Blue = home team win; Yellow = draw; Red = away team win.

==== Tie-breaker ====
Played on May 4, 1924, in Rome.

Team 1	Score	Team 2
Fortitudo Roma	0-2	Lazio

=== Campania ===
==== Classification ====
P	Team	Pld	W	D	L	GF	GA	GD	Pts	Promotion or relegation
1.	Savoia	10	9	1	0	21	2	+19	19	Qualified
2.	Internaples	10	5	2	3	19	9	+10	12	Qualified
3.	Cavese	10	5	1	4	17	15	+2	11	
4.	Bagnolese	10	4	2	4	12	12	0	10	Relegated by the FIGC
5.	Stabia	10	2	2	6	7	17	-10	6	Relegated by the FIGC
6.	Salernitanaudax	10	0	2	8	7	28	-21	2	Readmitted

==== Results table ====
Home \ Away	BAG	CAV	INT	SAL	SAV	STA
Bagnolese	—	3–1	1–3	0–0	0–1	2–0
Cavese	3–1	—	1–1	5–2	0–3	0–2
Internaples	1–1	0–1	—	5–0	0–1	2–0
Salernitanaudax	0–2	0–1	1–5	—	0–1	1–2
Savoia	3–0	2–1	3–0	5–1	—	2–0
Stabia	0–2	1–4	0–2	2–2	0–0	—

Legend: Blue = home team win; Yellow = draw; Red = away team win.

=== Apulia ===
==== Classification ====
P	Team	Pld	W	D	L	GF	GA	GD	Pts	Promotion or relegation
1.	Audace Taranto	10	7	2	1	16	4	+12	16	Qualified
2.	Ideale Bari	10	7	1	2	20	6	+14	15	Qualified
3.	Liberty Bari	10	4	2	4	12	13	-1	10	
3.	Enotria Taranto	10	4	2	4	10	11	-1	10	
5.	Pro Italia Taranto	10	4	0	6	8	13	-5	8	
6.	Foggia	10	0	1	9	3	22	-19	1	Relegated

==== Results table ====
Home \ Away	AUD	ENO	FOG	IDE	LIB	PRO
Audace Taranto	—	4–1	3–0	2–0	1–0	1–0
Enotria Taranto	2–0	—	1–0	1–0	1–1	0–1
Foggia	0–2	1–1	—	0–2	1–2	1–2
Ideale Bari	1–1	1–0	5–0	—	3–1	3–0
Liberty Bari	0–0	3–1	2–0	1–3	—	2–0
Pro Italia Taranto	0–2	0–2	2–0	0–2	3–0	—

Legend: Blue = home team win; Yellow = draw; Red = away team win.

=== Sicily ===
==== Qualification ====
Team 1	Agg.	Team 2	1st leg	2nd leg
Palermo	2-2	Messina	2-1	0-1

Repetition

Team 1	Score	Team 2
Messina	2-3	Palermo

Palermo qualified for the semifinals.

== Semifinals ==
=== Group A ===
==== Classification ====
P	Team	Pld	W	D	L	GF	GA	GD	Pts	Promotion or relegation
1.	Savoia	6	3	2	1	17	7	+10	8	Qualified
2.	Lazio	6	3	1	2	16	9	+7	7	
3.	Ideale Bari	6	2	1	3	11	18	-7	5	
4.	Anconitana	6	2	0	4	4	14	-10	4	

==== Results table ====
Home \ Away	ANC	IDE	LAZ	SAV
Anconitana	—	1–0	1–0	0–1
Ideale Bari	5–1	—	3–2	1–1
Lazio	3–1	6–1	—	2–2
Savoia	5–0	7–1	1–3	—

Legend: Blue = home team win; Yellow = draw; Red = away team win.

=== Group B ===
==== Classification ====
P	Team	Pld	W	D	L	GF	GA	GD	Pts	Promotion or relegation
1.	Alba Roma	6	3	2	1	16	9	+7	8	Tie-breaker
2.	Audace Taranto	6	3	2	1	12	10	+2	8	Tie-breaker
3.	Internaples	6	1	3	2	7	9	-2	5	
4.	Palermo	6	0	3	3	9	16	-7	3	

==== Results table ====
Home \ Away	ALB	AUD	INT	PAL
Alba Roma	—	1–1	2–0	5–1
Audace Taranto	3–2	—	1–0	2–2
Internaples	2–2	3–2	—	1–1
Palermo	2–4	2–3	1–1	—

Legend: Blue = home team win; Yellow = draw; Red = away team win.

==== Tie-breaker ====
Team 1	Score	Team 2
Alba Roma	2-0	Audace Taranto

== Finals ==
Team 1	Agg.	Team 2	1st leg	2nd leg
Savoia	● 2 points each ●	Alba Roma	2-0	0-1

Because of the sole points were considered by the championship regulations, with no relevance to the aggregation of goals, a tie-break was needed.

Tie-breaker

Team 1	Score	Team 2
Alba Roma	0-2	Savoia

Savoia qualified for the National Finals.
