= Gianni Garghentini =

Italian footballer

Personal information
- Full name: Gianni Garghentini
- Date of birth: 24 April 1977 (age 49)
- Place of birth: Milan, Italy
- Position: Forward

Youth career
- -1996: Como

Senior career*
Years	Team	Apps	(Gls)
1996–1998	Como	1	(0)
1996-1997	→ Meda	24	(1)
1997-1998	→ Saronno	29	(1)
1998–2001	Pro Sesto	87	(2)
2001–2002	Usmate	22	(1)
2002–2003	Olginatese	31	(2)
2003-2005	Cossatese	73	(5)
2005-2007	Casteggio Broni	42	(2)
2007	Biellese	?	(?)
2007-2010	Fidenza	?	(?)
2010-2011	Fiorenzuola	31	(0)
2011-2012	Villanterio	?	(?)
2012-2013	Trezzano	10	(0)
2013-2014	Cisliano	?	(2)
2014-2015	Abbiategrasso	?	(1)

Managerial career
- 2018-2020: Sempione Half (Youth)
- 2020-: Academy Pro Sesto (Youth)
- * Club domestic league appearances and goals

Gianni Garghentini (born 24 April 1977 in Milan) is a former Italian football player who played as a forward. Garghentini now works as a football coach.
