= 1924–25 Lega Sud =

Lega Sud
- Season: 1924–25
- Champions: Alba Rome

The Southern League was the amateur football championship in Southern Italy during the 20's of the 20th century.

The 1924–25 season was organized within the Italian Football Federation. The winner had the honour to play against the Northern Champions.

The League maintained the goal to improve the quality of the game in the area. As a new step, the League decided to reduce the regional tournaments to six matchdays for 1925–26 to improve the inter-league playoffs.

== Qualifications ==
=== Marche ===
Anconitana was the only participating team.

=== Lazio ===
==== Classification ====
P	Team	Pld	W	D	L	GF	GA	GD	Pts	Promotion or relegation
1.	Alba Roma	8	5	2	1	15	7	+8	12	Qualified
2.	Lazio	8	5	1	2	20	10	+10	11	Qualified
3.	Fortitudo•Roma	8	4	2	2	20	11	+9	10	
4.	Audace Roma	8	2	1	5	16	26	-10	5	Qualification play-off
5.	Pro Roma	8	0	2	6	4	21	-17	2	Re-elected

==== Results table ====
Home \ Away	ALB	AUD	FOR	LAZ	PRO
Alba Roma	—	2–1	1–1	2–2	1–0
Audace Roma	2–5	—	2–6	0–6	5–1
Fortitudo Roma	1–0	2–3	—	3–0	1–1
Lazio	0–3	3–2	3–0	—	3–0
Pro Roma	0–1	1–1	1–6	0–3	—

Legend: Blue = home team win; Yellow = draw; Red = away team win.

=== Campania ===
==== Classification ====
P	Team	Pld	W	D	L	GF	GA	GD	Pts	Promotion or relegation
1.	Savoia	6	4	1	1	11	6	+5	9	Qualified
2.	Cavese	6	3	2	1	9	3	+6	8	Qualified
3.	Internaples	6	2	3	1	9	7	+2	7	
4.	Salernitanaudax	6	0	0	6	4	21	-17	0	Relegated by the FIGC

==== Results table ====
Home \ Away	CAV	INT	SAL	SAV
Cavese	—	1–1	3–0	2–0
Internaples	1–1	—	3–0	1–1
Salernitanaudax	0–2	0–1	—	1–3
Savoia	1–0	4–2	2–0	—

Legend: Blue = home team win; Yellow = draw; Red = away team win.

=== Apulia ===
==== Classification ====
P	Team	Pld	W	D	L	GF	GA	GD	Pts	Promotion or relegation
1.	Pro Italia Taranto	10	7	1	2	22	8	+14	15	Qualified
1.	Liberty Bari	10	7	1	2	24	9	+15	15	Qualified
3.	Audace Taranto	10	5	3	2	20	8	+12	13	
4.	Ideale Bari	10	4	3	3	13	12	+1	11	
5.	US Tarantina	10	1	1	8	8	21	-13	3	Disbanded
5.	FBC Bari	10	0	3	7	2	31	-29	3	Disbanded

==== Results table ====
Home \ Away	AUD	FBC	IDE	LIB	PRO	UST
Audace Taranto	—	6–0	1–1	2–2	3–1	2–0
FBC Bari	0–0	—	0–4	0–2	0–4	1–1
Ideale Bari	1–0	1–1	—	0–2	0–0	2–0
Liberty Bari	0–1	7–0	4–1	—	1–0	2–0
Pro Italia Taranto	3–1	3–0	2–0	4–2	—	2–0
US Tarantina	0–4	3–0	2–3	1–2	1–3	—

Legend: Blue = home team win; Yellow = draw; Red = away team win.

==== Apulia's Championship play-off ====
Played on March 29, 1925, in Naples.

Team 1	Score	Team 2
Liberty Bari	0-1	Pro Italia Taranto

=== Sicily ===
==== Qualification ====
Team 1	Agg.	Team 2	1st leg	2nd leg
Palermo	0-3	Messina	0-2	0-1

Messina qualified for the semifinals.

== Semifinals ==
=== Group A ===
==== Classification ====
P	Team	Pld	W	D	L	GF	GA	GD	Pts	Promotion or relegation
1.	Anconitana	6	3	2	1	12	9	+3	8	Tie-breaker
2.	Lazio	6	3	2	1	13	8	+5	8	Tie-breaker
3.	Savoia	6	1	3	2	5	8	-3	5	Relegated by the FIGC
4.	Pro Italia Taranto	6	1	1	4	5	10	-5	3	

==== Results table ====
Home \ Away	ANC	LAZ	PRO	SAV
Anconitana	—	2–1	3–0	3–1
Lazio	6–3	—	1–0	1–1
Pro Italia Taranto	0–2	2–2	—	3–1
Savoia	1–1	0–2	1–0	—

Legend: Blue = home team win; Yellow = draw; Red = away team win.

==== Tie-breaker ====
Played on June 28, 1925, in Naples.

Team 1	Score	Team 2
Anconitana	1-0	Lazio

=== Group B ===
==== Classification ====
P	Team	Pld	W	D	L	GF	GA	GD	Pts	Promotion or relegation
1.	Alba Roma	6	5	1	0	21	2	+19	11	Qualified
2.	Cavese	6	3	2	1	6	7	-1	8	Relegated by the FIGC
3.	Liberty Bari	6	1	1	4	3	12	-9	3	
4.	Messina	6	0	2	4	2	11	-9	2	

==== Results table ====
Home \ Away	ALB	CAV	LIB	MES
Alba Roma	—	5–0	6–0	3–0
Cavese	1–1	—	2–0	2–1
Liberty Bari	0–3	0–1	—	0–0
Messina	1–3	0–0	0–3	—

Legend: Blue = home team win; Yellow = draw; Red = away team win.

== Finals ==
Team 1	Agg.	Team 2	1st leg	2nd leg
Anconitana	1-4	Alba Roma	1-3	0-1

Alba Roma qualified for the National Finals.
