= 1926–27 Divisione Nazionale =

26th season of top-tier Italian football

Divisione Nazionale
- Season: 1926–27
- Dates: 3 October 1926 – 10 July 1927
- Champions: Not awarded (Torino were stripped of their title due to match fixing)
- Relegated: No relegations (Roma and Napoli were later readmitted to Divisione Nazionale as guests)
- Matches: 210
- Goals: 696 (3.31 per match)
- Top goalscorer: Anton Powolny (22 goals)

The 1926-27 Divisione Nazionale was the twenty-seventh edition of the Italian Football Championship. It was also the fourth season from which the Italian Football Champions' adorned their team jerseys in the subsequent season with a Scudetto. This was the first of three seasons of the Italian Football Championship re-branded to Divisione Nazionale (replacing the previous Prima Divisione). The 1926–27 Divisione Nazionale won by Torino was revoked during the following season. That was due to alleged match fixing in a derby versus Juventus.

== The Viareggio Charter ==
In 1926 the ”Viareggio Charter” submitted the Italian football's organization to the fascist regime. The Northern League was disbanded and it was replaced by the fascist regime appointed Higher Divisions Directory. Three clubs from Southern Italy were added to the original sixteen-clubs championship to make it a national league. The 20th club had been chosen by a special qualification between the relegated clubs of the Northern League which was won by US Alessandria.

Hence, in a complete re-structure from previous Italian Championships, Divisione Nazionale was organised into two non-geographical round robin contests. In 1926-27 it was contested by 17 Northern Italian clubs plus two from Rome plus SSC Napoli. The top three teams from each of they two round robins then decided the championship via a round robin finals contest. The finals phase replaced the previous championship final that had become a traditional appointment with riots and supporter violences.

== First phase ==
=== Group A ===
==== Classification ====
P	Team	Pld	W	D	L	GF	GA	GD	Pts	Qualification or relegation
1.	Juventus	18	12	3	3	44	10	+34	27	Qualified to the finals
1.	Internazionale	18	12	3	3	49	22	+27	27	Qualified to the finals
3.	Genoa	18	10	4	4	37	15	+22	24	Qualified to the finals
4.	Casale	18	9	3	6	24	22	+2	21	
5.	Pro Vercelli	18	7	6	5	27	22	+5	20	
6.	Modena	18	6	6	6	21	27	-6	18	
7.	Brescia	18	6	3	9	28	35	-7	15	
7.	Hellas Verona	18	6	3	9	19	35	-16	15	
9.	Alba-Audace Roma	18	5	2	11	25	32	-7	12	Disbanded
10.	Napoli	18	0	1	17	7	61	-54	1	Later readmitted

==== Results table ====
- The home teams are read down the left hand side while the away teams are indicated along the top.

Home \ Away	ALB	BRE	CAS	GEN	HEL	INT	JUV	MOD	NAP	PRO
Alba-Audace Roma	—	5–2	0–1	1–3	3–0	1–1	0–2	1–2	5–2	3–0
Brescia	4–0	—	3–1	1–0	4–2	0–3	0–2	2–2	5–1	0–0
Casale	3–1	3–0	—	2–1	2–0	1–1	0–2	3–0	3–0	1–1
Genoa	2–0	4–1	4–0	—	2–0	4–0	1–2	2–1	4–1	3–0
Hellas Verona	2–0	1–4	1–2	1–1	—	1–1	1–0	1–0	5–0	2–1
Internazionale	2–1	4–1	3–0	2–1	5–0	—	3–0	2–1	9–2	2–0
Juventus	1–0	2–0	4–0	0–0	6–0	4–1	—	7–2	8–0	0–1
Modena	2–2	2–0	1–0	1–1	0–0	1–4	1–1	—	1–0	3–1
Napoli	0–2	0–0	0–2	0–2	0–1	0–3	0–3	0–1	—	0–3
Pro Vercelli	3–0	3–1	0–0	2–2	4–1	4–3	0–0	0–0	4–1	—

Legend: Blue = home team win; Yellow = draw; Red = away team win.

=== Group B ===
==== Classification ====
P	Team	Pld	W	D	L	GF	GA	GD	Pts	Qualification or relegation
1.	Torino	18	12	2	4	52	25	+27	26	Qualified to the finals
2.	Milan	18	11	2	5	41	27	+14	24	Qualified to the finals
2.	Bologna	18	11	2	5	38	26	+12	24	Qualified to the finals
4.	Alessandria	18	9	3	6	42	24	+18	21	
5.	Livorno	18	9	2	7	32	28	+4	20	
5.	Sampierdarenese	18	9	2	7	31	36	-5	20	
7.	Padova	18	7	1	10	29	44	-15	15	
8.	Andrea Doria	18	5	3	10	16	31	-15	13	Disbanded
9.	Cremonese	18	6	0	12	19	35	-16	12	Later readmitted
10.	Fortitudo-Pro Roma	18	2	1	15	18	42	-24	5	Later readmitted

==== Results table ====
- The home teams are read down the left hand side while the away teams are indicated along the top.

Home \ Away	ALE	ADO	BOL	CRE	FOR	LIV	MIL	PAD	SAM	TOR
Alessandria	—	5–0	5–1	2–1	3–1	0–0	3–1	6–1	6–1	1–3
Andrea Doria	1–2	—	0–1	2–1	1–2	2–1	1–0	1–0	1–1	1–2
Bologna	2–0	0–0	—	4–2	2–1	3–2	4–1	5–1	4–2	1–1
Cremonese	1–0	3–1	1–0	—	1–0	0–1	1–2	0–2	4–0	0–1
Fortitudo-Pro-Roma	1–1	0–1	0–2	1–2	—	0–2	2–3	1–2	0–1	4–2
Livorno	1–2	2–1	3–1	4–0	3–1	—	1–2	5–0	3–0	2–1
Milan	1–1	4–1	4–2	1–0	4–0	3–0	—	5–2	1–2	3–1
Padova	3–2	1–1	0–2	4–1	5–3	3–1	1–3	—	3–1	0–1
Sampierdarenese	2–1	3–0	1–3	2–0	3–1	1–1	3–1	3–0	—	4–1
Torino	3–2	3–1	2–1	8–1	4–0	8–0	2–2	3–1	6–1	—

Legend: Blue = home team win; Yellow = draw; Red = away team win.

== Final round ==
=== Classification ===
P	Team	Pld	W	D	L	GF	GA	GD	Pts	Qualification or relegation
1.	Torino	10	7	0	3	17	15	+2	14	First team
2.	Bologna	10	5	2	3	14	6	+8	12	
3.	Juventus	10	5	1	4	24	13	+11	11	
4.	Genoa	10	4	1	5	15	21	-6	9	
5.	Internazionale	10	3	2	5	13	16	-3	8	
6.	Milan	10	2	2	6	13	25	-12	6	

=== Results table ===
Home \ Away	BOL	GEN	INT	JUV	MIL	TOR
Bologna	—	1–0	3–0	1–0	2–1	5–0
Genoa	1–0	—	1–1	2–3	2–0	3–1
Internazionale	1–0	2–3	—	2–1	1–2	1–2
Juventus	1–1	6–0	1–3	—	8–2	1–0
Milan	1–1	4–2	1–1	0–2	—	2–3
Torino	1–0	3–1	2–1	2–1	3–0	—

Legend: Blue = home team win; Yellow = draw; Red = away team win.

== Top goalscorers ==
Rank	Player	Club	Goals
1	(Austria) Anton Powolny	Internazionale	22
2	(Argentina) (Italy) Julio Libonatti	Torino	21
3	(Italy) Gino Rossetti	Torino	19
4	(Italy) Antonio Vojak	Juventus	16

== References and sources ==
- Almanacco Illustrato del Calcio - La Storia 1898-2004, Panini Edizioni, Modena, September 2005
