= Oltrepò =

Oltrepò (on the other side of the river Po) may refer to one of three geographical regions in Northern Italy, to a wine, and to a football team:

- The Oltrepò Ferrarese a small area to the north of the Po which belonged to Ferrara until the Napoleonic invasion, after which it was incorporated into the Veneto.
- The Oltrepò Mantovano, again to the south of the river, is an area which for centuries formed part of the Duchy of Mantua and today forms part of the Province of Mantua.
- The Oltrepò Pavese, an area to the south of the Po centred on the city of Voghera which became part of the Province of Pavia in 1859.
  - Oltrepò Calcio, the former name of the football team S.G. Stradellina, which is based in the town of Stradella in the Oltrepò Pavese.
  - Oltrepò Pavese (wine), which is produced in the area.
