= 1946–47 Serie B =

Italian football league season

Serie B
- Season: 1946–47

The Serie B 1946–47 championship was organized by the Lega Calcio with geographical criteria: for this reason the three groups have different numbers of participants.

== Teams ==
26 clubs had variously qualified for this championship, following the results of both 1942–43 and 1945–46 seasons. However, war damages and political choices imposed to divide the old Serie B between Northern and Southern Italy. Consequently, 20 Northern clubs from the previous Serie B-C and 14 selected teams from Southern Italy were added.

== Events ==
To reduce the fixtures to 34 matchdays the following season, four teams per group and an additional club from Northern Italy had to be relegated.

Three groups were created: North-West, North-East and South. The group with 22 clubs was a record in the Italian football history.

== Group A ==
=== Final classification ===
Pos	Team	Pld	W	D	L	GF	GA	GR	Pts	Promotion or relegation
1	Pro Patria (P)	42	27	6	9	84	39	2.154	60	Promotion to Serie A
2	Legnano	42	21	11	10	67	42	1.595	53	
3	Novara	42	18	12	12	47	34	1.382	48	
3	Seregno	42	18	12	12	69	52	1.327	48	
3	Spezia	42	18	12	12	62	47	1.319	48	
3	Pistoiese	42	21	6	15	86	70	1.229	48	
7	Vigevano	42	18	10	14	59	57	1.035	46	
8	Como	42	16	10	16	61	59	1.034	42	
8	Pro Vercelli	42	14	14	14	54	52	1.038	42	
8	Gallaratese	42	13	16	13	31	40	0.775	42	
11	Fanfulla	42	16	9	17	66	60	1.100	41	
11	Crema	42	17	7	18	60	57	1.053	41	
11	Carrarese	42	15	11	16	51	53	0.962	41	
11	Pro Sesto	42	17	7	18	49	56	0.875	41	
15	Viareggio	42	16	8	18	72	70	1.029	40	
15	Varese	42	17	6	19	61	62	0.984	40	
17	Vogherese	42	16	7	19	54	69	0.783	39	Relegation tie-breaker
18	Biellese (R)	42	14	11	17	63	75	0.840	39	North. Italy relegation playoff
19	Sestrese (R)	42	12	13	17	61	69	0.884	37	Relegation to Serie C
20	Lecco (R)	42	12	10	20	50	67	0.746	34	Relegation to Serie C
21	Savona (R)	42	13	6	23	49	78	0.628	32	Relegation to Serie C
22	Casale (R)	42	7	8	27	47	95	0.495	22	Relegation to Serie C

Source: Panini
(P) Promoted; (R) Relegated

=== Results ===
Home \ Away	BIE	CAR	CSL	COM	CRM	FAN	GLR	LCO	LEG	NOV	PST	PPA	PSE	PVE	SVN	SER	SES	SPE	VAR	VIA	VIG	VOG
Biellese		2–1	0–0	5–3	2–4	0–0	1–1	2–0	2–1	0–0	2–1	2–0	0–3	2–1	3–2	5–1	2–2	0–1	1–3	2–0	2–2	4–1
Carrarese	5–1		4–1	1–0	1–1	5–1	0–0	4–1	2–0	1–0	1–1	0–0	1–0	1–1	3–1	1–1	1–0	3–0	1–1	4–2	3–0	2–0
Casale	2–4	1–2		5–2	2–3	3–0	2–2	3–1	1–2	1–2	2–3	0–3	1–1	0–0	1–2	0–1	2–2	1–0	1–3	1–2	1–2	0–1
Como	4–0	1–1	1–0		1–1	2–1	1–0	1–0	1–1	1–0	4–2	3–2	4–0	1–0	2–0	4–1	0–1	2–2	1–1	2–0	0–1	2–0
Crema	2–1	0–0	1–2	2–0		1–1	1–0	0–2	0–1	2–1	5–1	0–1	1–0	1–0	4–1	2–2	4–1	3–1	1–2	4–1	4–1	2–0
Fanfulla	0–4	4–0	1–2	2–2	4–1		2–1	6–0	1–0	3–0	4–3	2–0	1–1	3–0	5–1	2–0	2–0	1–0	3–0	1–1	0–1	1–0
Gallaratese	1–1	1–0	0–0	1–0	0–0	1–0		1–0	1–1	0–2	1–1	0–0	0–0	3–0	2–0	1–0	1–0	0–2	2–1	1–0	1–0	1–0
Lecco	1–0	1–0	3–0	0–0	3–0	3–0	3–0		0–0	2–1	2–1	1–1	2–1	2–3	2–1	3–3	1–1	0–0	0–0	4–4	0–0	2–0
Legnano	1–1	1–0	1–1	2–1	2–1	1–1	1–1	2–0		2–0	2–1	2–0	4–0	4–2	6–0	0–3	4–2	1–1	1–0	1–0	4–1	1–0
Novara	1–1	1–0	4–0	2–0	2–0	0–0	1–1	2–0	1–0		1–1	2–1	2–0	1–0	3–0	2–1	0–2	0–1	1–1	3–0	3–3	1–0
Pistoiese	2–1	4–0	7–1	2–2	3–1	2–0	3–0	3–1	1–3	1–0		2–0	5–0	1–0	2–1	1–0	4–1	4–1	2–1	1–0	4–2	2–1
Pro Patria	3–1	2–0	4–0	4–2	2–0	6–2	2–1	1–0	1–0	2–0	4–0		2–1	3–1	2–1	4–2	2–1	2–1	5–3	2–1	4–0	10–0
Pro Sesto	2–0	3–1	0–1	1–0	2–1	1–0	1–0	3–1	2–1	1–1	1–2	0–0		3–0	4–0	0–1	2–0	1–2	1–2	4–1	0–2	1–0
Pro Vercelli	2–2	2–0	2–1	2–0	1–0	1–1	1–3	1–0	0–0	0–0	2–2	1–1	2–0		4–0	1–1	1–1	3–0	3–1	2–0	2–0	5–1
Savona	1–0	2–0	2–2	0–1	3–1	4–2	3–0	1–0	2–1	1–2	3–1	0–2	1–1	1–1		3–1	3–0	0–1	0–0	0–1	1–0	1–2
Seregno	4–0	1–0	2–1	3–0	0–0	2–2	1–1	5–2	0–2	0–0	5–3	2–0	1–0	1–1	5–0		4–0	1–1	1–0	3–0	2–0	3–0
Sestrese	4–1	5–0	4–1	3–3	0–1	1–0	2–0	3–2	2–2	2–1	1–1	0–1	0–1	1–0	4–4	1–1		1–1	1–0	1–1	5–1	1–1
Spezia	2–0	1–1	4–0	1–1	2–1	1–0	0–0	3–1	0–0	1–2	3–2	1–0	7–0	3–1	0–1	1–1	2–2		4–2	3–0	2–0	2–2
Varese	1–3	3–0	5–2	2–1	1–3	1–5	1–1	3–2	1–0	0–1	2–1	0–1	2–0	0–2	2–1	2–0	3–1	1–2		2–0	4–1	2–0
Viareggio	4–1	2–1	4–0	2–3	5–1	5–1	3–0	4–0	1–5	1–0	5–2	2–3	1–1	2–2	0–0	2–0	3–0	3–2	2–1		2–2	3–0
Vigevano	2–2	4–0	4–1	2–1	1–0	1–0	0–0	2–1	6–2	0–0	2–0	0–0	1–2	0–0	3–0	0–1	1–0	2–0	3–1	3–1		2–0
Vogherese	4–0	0–0	4–1	3–1	1–0	2–1	3–0	1–1	1–2	1–1	2–1	2–1	2–4	5–1	2–1	4–2	4–2	1–0	1–0	1–1	1–1	

Source: Almanacco Illustrato del Calcio - La Storia 1898-2004, Panini Edizioni, Modena, September 2005 (in Italian)
Legend: Blue = home team win; Yellow = draw; Red = away team win.

=== Relegation tie-breaker ===
Played in Legnano on July 13:

Team 1	Score	Team 2
Biellese	1-3	Vogherese

Biellese qualified for the Northern Italy relegation play-off while Vogherese remained in Serie B.

== Group B ==
=== Final classification ===
Pos	Team	Pld	W	D	L	GF	GA	GR	Pts	Promotion or relegation
1	Lucchese (P)	40	24	6	10	78	45	1.733	54	Promotion to Serie A
2	Padova	40	20	9	11	53	36	1.472	49	
3	Empoli	40	18	11	11	54	39	1.385	47	
4	Treviso	40	19	8	13	56	41	1.366	46	
5	Siena	40	17	11	12	47	45	1.044	45	
6	S.P.A.L.	40	15	13	12	53	33	1.606	43	
6	Cremonese	40	17	9	14	65	47	1.383	43	
8	Verona	40	15	12	13	59	48	1.229	42	
8	Mantova	40	16	10	14	49	51	0.961	42	
10	Suzzara	40	12	17	11	38	58	0.655	41	
11	Udinese	40	14	12	14	47	42	1.119	40	
12	Piacenza	40	15	9	16	37	44	0.841	39	
12	Reggiana	40	12	15	13	38	48	0.792	39	
14	Parma	40	14	10	16	41	45	0.911	38	
15	Prato	40	14	9	17	46	50	0.920	37	
16	Pisa	40	12	12	16	38	44	0.864	36	Relegation tie-breaker
17	Anconitana	40	13	10	17	43	51	0.843	36	North. Italy relegation playoff
18	Mestrina (R)	40	12	9	19	40	56	0.714	33	Relegation to Serie C
19	Forlì (R)	40	10	11	19	38	56	0.679	31	Relegation to Serie C
20	Pro Gorizia (T)	40	9	12	19	38	57	0.667	30	Readmitted (Note: Pro Gorizia was readmitted to Serie B for political reasons against Yugoslavia.)
21	Cesena (R)	40	10	9	21	36	58	0.621	29	Relegation to Serie C

Source: Panini
(P) Promoted; (R) Relegated; (T) Qualified, but not yet for the particular phase indicated

=== Results ===
Home \ Away	ANC	CES	CRE	EMP	FOR	LUC	MAN	MST	PAD	PAR	PIA	PIS	PRA	PGO	REA	SIE	SPA	SUZ	TRV	UDI	HEL
Anconitana		1–0	4–2	1–2	3–1	0–4	2–0	0–0	1–0	2–1	4–0	2–1	1–1	2–2	1–1	1–1	1–0	0–1	2–1	1–1	1–0
Cesena	2–1		2–1	2–4	0–0	4–2	0–1	1–1	1–0	1–1	0–1	2–0	1–0	2–0	2–2	0–1	1–0	0–0	3–2	1–0	1–3
Cremonese	1–0	4–0		0–0	1–0	3–4	1–1	2–0	2–0	1–1	0–0	3–0	0–2	3–1	7–0	6–0	2–1	4–1	1–1	2–1	1–1
Empoli	3–1	2–1	0–0		1–1	5–2	1–0	2–0	0–1	2–1	4–2	2–0	1–0	0–1	1–0	1–0	1–1	3–0	1–2	1–0	4–0
Forlì	2–2	2–1	3–3	0–0		0–2	2–1	3–2	1–1	1–1	2–0	1–0	3–0	2–1	1–0	0–0	3–3	0–0	0–1	1–0	2–1
Lucchese	3–1	3–0	1–0	2–3	2–0		5–0	1–2	2–1	3–1	1–0	0–0	2–0	3–0	1–0	0–2	2–1	4–2	7–0	2–1	3–2
Mantova	2–0	4–3	2–1	2–0	1–0	1–1		2–0	1–2	3–0	0–0	1–1	1–0	2–0	0–0	1–1	2–1	0–0	5–1	3–1	1–0
Mestrina	0–2	1–0	0–2	1–2	1–0	0–2	4–1		0–0	2–0	2–1	1–0	4–1	1–0	1–1	2–1	1–1	0–0	0–0	2–0	1–2
Padova	2–1	2–0	1–0	2–0	3–1	1–1	3–1	1–2		1–0	2–0	2–0	4–1	1–0	4–2	3–0	1–0	0–0	1–0	1–1	3–2
Parma	2–1	1–1	3–0	1–0	1–0	0–1	2–1	1–1	1–1		0–2	2–1	1–0	2–1	4–0	2–1	0–0	3–1	1–0	3–0	2–0
Piacenza	1–0	2–2	0–3	2–1	3–2	0–2	2–3	2–0	1–0	1–0		3–0	1–0	2–0	1–1	2–0	1–1	0–1	0–0	1–0	2–1
Pisa	1–0	1–1	1–0	1–0	2–1	3–2	3–1	1–0	2–1	0–0	0–0		1–1	4–1	2–1	1–1	0–0	3–3	0–0	2–0	3–1
Prato	2–0	2–0	4–1	1–1	2–0	1–0	0–0	3–1	0–1	1–1	0–2	3–2		3–1	1–1	2–1	1–1	7–2	1–0	1–0	2–1
Pro Gorizia	1–1	0–0	4–1	0–0	1–0	0–0	2–1	2–2	2–3	1–0	2–1	2–0	2–0		1–1	1–2	1–1	2–0	1–1	0–4	1–1
Reggiana	0–0	1–0	1–0	1–1	2–1	2–1	0–2	4–1	0–0	1–0	2–1	1–0	1–1	1–1		1–0	4–1	0–0	1–1	2–1	2–0
Siena	1–1	2–1	2–0	1–0	1–1	0–1	1–0	3–1	3–3	3–1	4–0	2–1	2–1	1–0	1–0		1–0	4–2	1–0	0–0	0–0
SPAL	4–0	1–0	1–2	3–0	2–1	3–0	0–0	1–0	1–1	1–0	2–0	1–0	3–0	4–1	3–0	2–0		6–0	1–0	0–0	0–0
Suzzara	0–1	2–0	0–0	2–2	1–0	1–1	0–0	1–0	2–1	1–1	0–0	1–0	1–0	1–0	1–0	1–0	1–1		3–1	0–0	1–1
Treviso	1–0	1–0	3–0	2–1	3–0	1–2	2–1	4–2	1–0	3–0	1–0	1–0	2–0	1–0	2–0	1–1	2–0	8–1		1–1	5–1
Udinese	2–1	3–0	1–3	1–1	4–0	3–2	4–0	2–0	1–0	1–0	0–0	0–0	1–1	1–0	2–1	1–1	2–1	4–3	1–0		1–1
Hellas Verona	2–0	3–0	0–2	1–1	3–0	1–1	5–1	4–1	2–0	4–0	1–0	1–1	2–0	2–2	0–0	4–1	1–0	1–1	1–0	3–1	

Source: Almanacco Illustrato del Calcio - La Storia 1898-2004, Panini Edizioni, Modena, September 2005 (in Italian)
Legend: Blue = home team win; Yellow = draw; Red = away team win.

=== Relegation tie-breaker ===
Played in Modena on July 13:

Team 1	Score	Team 2
Anconitana	1-2	Pisa

Pisa was saved while Anconitana qualified for the Northern Italy relegation play-off.

== Group C ==
=== Final classification ===
Pos	Team	Pld	W	D	L	GF	GA	GR	Pts	Promotion or relegation
1	Salernitana (P)	32	16	12	4	59	23	2.565	44	Promotion to Serie A
2	Ternana	32	18	5	9	47	44	1.068	41	
3	Pescara	32	15	7	10	61	35	1.743	37	
4	Lecce	32	15	5	12	56	33	1.697	35	
4	Scafatese	32	14	7	11	34	36	0.944	35	
6	Torrese	32	12	8	12	46	50	0.920	32	
6	Rieti	32	13	6	13	36	41	0.878	32	
8	Palermo	32	11	9	12	36	35	1.029	31	
8	Brindisi	32	10	11	11	34	42	0.810	31	
8	Arsenale Taranto	32	11	9	12	38	49	0.776	31	
11	Perugia	32	10	10	12	32	42	0.762	30	
12	Cosenza	32	7	15	10	39	33	1.182	29	
12	Siracusa	32	12	5	15	37	49	0.755	29	
14	Alba Trastevere (R)	32	11	6	15	43	57	0.754	28	Relegation to Serie C
15	Taranto (R, E)	32	10	7	15	34	44	0.773	27	Disbanded (Note: A.S. Taranto merged with U.S. Arsenale Taranto at the end of the season to form U.S. Arsenaltaranto.)
16	Catanzaro (R)	32	11	4	17	37	36	1.028	26	Relegation to Serie C
17	Foggia (R)	32	10	6	16	33	53	0.623	26	Relegation to Serie C

Source: Panini
(E) Eliminated; (P) Promoted; (R) Relegated

=== Results ===
Home \ Away	ALT	ARS	BRI	CTZ	COS	FOG	LCE	PAL	PER	PES	RIE	SAL	SCF	SIR	TAR	TER	TRS
Alba Trastevere		1–1	2–0	1–0	3–0	2–0	1–1	1–3	0–1	2–0	0–1	2–2	1–1	2–0	2–1	1–1	4–3
Arsenale Taranto	4–0		2–0	2–0	2–1	1–0	0–0	2–1	2–3	3–2	1–0	2–1	1–2	3–0	2–2	1–2	0–0
Brindisi	0–2	3–3		1–0	1–1	3–1	2–2	2–0	2–0	1–1	3–1	1–1	1–0	4–1	1–0	2–1	1–1
Catanzaro	3–4	2–0	2–0		0–0	2–0	3–1	0–1	3–0	1–0	0–1	0–0	1–0	3–1	4–0	5–0	4–2
Cosenza	5–0	0–0	4–1	1–1		1–1	2–1	1–0	6–0	0–0	0–2	1–1	0–0	3–0	3–2	2–3	2–2
Foggia	2–1	2–1	0–0	1–0	0–0		0–1	1–1	2–2	2–1	3–1	1–0	2–0	2–3	4–0	0–1	2–1
Lecce	3–1	5–1	3–0	3–0	2–1	6–0		5–1	1–0	1–2	0–2	1–0	8–0	3–0	0–1	3–1	2–0
Palermo	1–0	0–0	0–0	2–1	1–0	0–2	1–1		0–0	1–0	2–1	0–0	1–2	2–0	1–1	5–1	5–0
Perugia	2–2	0–0	2–0	4–1	0–0	3–1	0–0	3–1		0–0	4–0	1–3	2–1	1–0	1–0	0–1	0–2
Pescara	4–0	8–1	1–1	2–0	1–1	4–0	5–0	2–1	3–0		6–1	2–0	3–1	3–2	4–0	2–1	2–0
Rieti	2–1	3–1	1–0	2–1	0–0	2–1	0–1	1–2	0–0	1–0		2–2	0–0	4–0	3–1	1–1	2–1
Salernitana	5–0	5–0	2–0	1–0	1–1	2–1	2–0	2–0	1–1	5–0	3–0		3–0	3–2	2–1	6–1	1–1
Scafatese	1–0	1–1	4–0	2–0	1–0	0–0	1–0	1–0	2–0	0–0	3–1	0–1		1–0	2–0	2–0	2–1
Siracusa	3–2	3–0	1–1	2–0	1–0	3–0	1–0	0–0	1–0	3–2	1–1	1–1	1–0		2–0	0–1	2–1
Taranto	3–1	0–1	0–0	0–0	1–0	4–0	2–1	1–1	1–1	2–0	1–0	0–2	4–1	2–0		2–0	1–1
Ternana	2–1	1–0	2–1	1–0	4–2	3–1	1–0	3–1	1–0	1–1	1–0	0–0	2–2	2–1	2–0		5–0
Torrese	2–3	1–0	1–2	1–0	1–1	4–1	2–1	1–0	4–1	3–0	1–0	1–1	2–1	2–2	2–1	2–1	

Source: Almanacco Illustrato del Calcio - La Storia 1898-2004, Panini Edizioni, Modena, September 2005 (in Italian)
Legend: Blue = home team win; Yellow = draw; Red = away team win.

== Northern Italy relegation play-off ==
When the Football League rejected in autumn 1946 the planned reduction of the Serie A, wild cards for two places in Serie B were given to the FIGC. US Cagliari joined after the end of the US occupation of Sardinia. Extraordinary match to fill the last place was organized.

Played in Bologna on August 31:

Team 1	Score	Team 2
Anconitana	4-2	Biellese

Biellese relegated to Serie C while Anconitana was re-admitted to Serie B.

== References and sources ==
- Almanacco Illustrato del Calcio - La Storia 1898-2004, Panini Edizioni, Modena, September 2005
