= John Grant (footballer, born 1891) =

English footballer

Personal information
- Full name: John Wylie Grant
- Date of birth: 1891
- Place of birth: London, England
- Position: Centre forward

Senior career*
| Years | Team | Apps | (Gls) |
| 1906–1907 | Cliftonville | | |
| 1907–1909 | In Sweden | | |
| 1909–1911 | Southport Central | | |
| 1911–1912 | Woolwich Arsenal | 4 | (3) |
| 1912–1915 | Genoa | 28 | (41) |
- * Club domestic league appearances and goals

John Wylie Grant (1891 – after 1915) was an English professional footballer who played as a centre forward throughout Europe in the early part of the twentieth century.

== Career ==
Born in London, Grant played in Ireland for Cliftonville, in Sweden, in England for Southport Central and Woolwich Arsenal, and in Italy for Genoa. At Arsenal, Grant scored 3 goals in 4 games in the Football League.
