= Anton Powolny =

Austrian footballer

Personal information
- Date of birth: 19 August 1899
- Place of birth: Vienna, Austria-Hungary
- Position: Striker

Senior career*
Years	Team	Apps	(Gls)
1916–1921	Austria Vienna		
1921–1924	SC Ober-Sankt Veit		
1924	Wiener AF		
1924–1926	Reggiana		
1926–1927	Inter Milan	27	(22)
1927–1928	Attila FC Miskolc		
1928–1929	Sabaria FC		
1929–1931	Wiener Sportclub		

Managerial career
- 1931–1935: RFK Reichenberg
- * Club domestic league appearances and goals

Anton Powolny (born 29 August 1899) was an Austrian footballer who played as a striker. During his only season in Italy with Inter, he was the top scorer in the 1926–27 Divisione Nazionale season, with 22 goals in 27 appearances.
