= Foot Ball Club di Roma =

Italian sports club

Roman
- Full name: Foot Ball Club di Roma
- Founded: 1884 (sports club); 1901 (football section)
- Dissolved: 7 June 1927
- Ground: Campo di "2 Pini" Rome, Italy
- Capacity: unknown
- League: I Divisione
- 1925-26: Lega Sud Girone D, 9th
Home colours	Away colours

Foot Ball Club di Roma (most known as Roman) was an Italian sports club from the Parioli area of Rome, founded in 1901 and most known for its football activity. The club competed in the early Italian Football Championship competitions. In 1927 it was one of three Rome-based clubs that merged to form AS Roma, to whom they lent their colours.

== History ==
The earliest origins of the club was from 1901 when Foot Ball Club di Roma was founded as a sports club. They did not open their association football section until 1903 however with a slight name change.

During the earliest days of the Italian Football Championship, only Northern Italian football clubs gained entry into the league so Roman had to wait until 1912–13 to make their championship debut and finished mid-table in the Lazio group. The following season the club played well, but did not progress past the Lazio group stage as SS Lazio themselves were more dominant.

Their third season in the championship was more successful, they finished top of the Lazio group earning progression to the Central and Southern finals; even beating rivals SS Lazio 5–2. However, before the competition could progress any further, it was called off because of World War I.

=== Post-war ===
After World War I, Roman were weaker, they finished bottom of their group in the 1919–20 return season as they had to forfeit several games. Similar results were returned in the following season. During the Italian Football Federation splinter of 1921, Roman participated in the CCI variation rather than the FIGC one.

When the leagues merged back together, Roman performed poorly and were relegated down to "I Divisione" (now known as Serie B). Roman could not gain promotion after several seasons of trying, and in 1927 they merged with Alba-Audace and Fortitudo to form AS Roma.
