= 1925–26 Prima Divisione =

25th season of top-tier Italian football

Prima Divisione
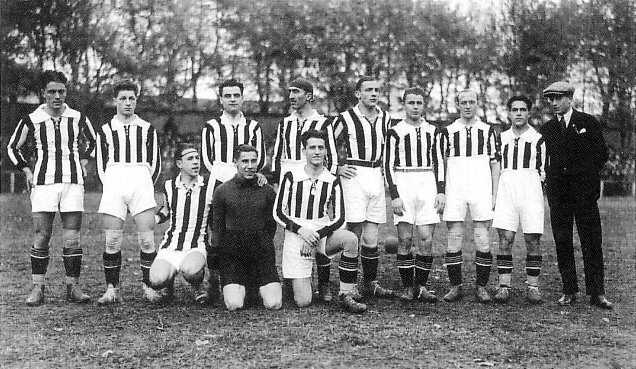
- 1925–26 Juventus team
- Season: 1925–26
- Champions: Juventus; 2nd title
- Relegated: Novara; Udinese; Pisa; Legnano; Reggiana; Parma; Mantova
- Matches: 385
- Goals: 1,512 (3.93 per match)
- Top goalscorer: Ferenc Hirzer (35 goals)

The 1925–26 Prima Divisione was the twenty-sixth edition of the Italian Football Championship and the fifth and last season branded Prima Divisione (before its re-brand to Divisione Nazionale). This season was the third from which the Italian Football Champions' celebrations included adorning the team jerseys in the subsequent season with a Scudetto. The 1925–26 Prima Divisione was the second Italian Football Championship won by Juventus and their first in the scudetto era.

== Format ==
All five seasons of Prima Divisione were scheduled as regional competitions, leading to a national final.

== Northern League ==
=== Regular season ===
Udinese and Parma FC had been promoted from the Second Division.

Goal average was introduced eliminating the tie-breakers.

The Northern League decided to create the Serie A with 16 teams starting in 1926, so the last four teams of each group should be relegated.

However, just after the end of the regular season the fascists postponed thus project under protests of Southern clubs which would be excluded. They imposed a National Division of two groups instead, and all relegated clubs entered into an extraordinary qualification for the new tournament.

==== Group A ====
===== Classification =====
P	Team	Pld	W	D	L	GF	GA	GD	Pts	Promotion or relegation
1.	Bologna	22	17	4	1	74	20	+54	38	Qualified to the final
2.	Torino	22	16	4	2	67	28	+39	36	
3.	Modena	22	11	3	8	45	30	+15	25	
4.	Hellas Verona	22	10	5	7	58	48	+10	25	
5.	Internazionale	22	10	5	7	44	38	+6	25	
6.	Casale	22	9	4	9	42	32	+10	22	
7.	Andrea Doria	22	9	3	10	37	50	−13	21	
8.	Brescia	22	8	3	11	38	51	−15	19	
9.	Novara	22	6	6	10	40	42	−2	18	Qualifications to the National Division
10.	Udinese	22	5	3	14	38	75	−37	13	Qualifications to the National Division
11.	Pisa	22	5	2	15	23	65	−42	12	Qualifications to the National Division
12.	Legnano	22	3	4	15	22	49	−27	10	Qualifications to the National Division

===== Results table =====
Home \ Away	ADO	BOL	BRE	CAS	HEL	INT	LEG	MOD	NOV	PIS	TOR	UDI
Andrea Doria	—	3–3	4–1	3–2	3–2	2–0	3–1	2–1	2–2	5–1	0–0	3–2
Bologna	3–0	—	6–0	1–0	7–0	4–1	6–0	1–0	4–1	7–0	3–2	4–0
Brescia	5–0	1–2	—	2–1	3–2	0–1	2–0	2–2	4–1	2–0	3–4	3–1
Casale	2–0	0–1	2–0	—	3–2	3–3	5–0	4–0	1–1	4–0	2–3	2–1
Hellas Verona	5–1	2–2	4–2	4–3	—	1–0	4–1	0–2	2–2	7–1	1–1	4–0
Internazionale	0–1	1–1	4–0	4–1	3–3	—	2–0	2–1	5–4	1–0	3–4	4–2
Legnano	1–0	1–2	1–1	0–2	1–3	1–1	—	0–1	0–0	4–1	1–2	6–1
Modena	6–0	0–0	3–2	2–3	3–2	3–0	2–0	—	4–1	6–2	1–1	5–1
Novara	3–1	1–2	5–1	0–0	1–2	1–1	3–1	0–1	—	2–0	0–2	6–3
Pisa	3–2	0–6	0–1	1–1	1–3	1–3	2–0	1–0	4–3	—	1–1	1–2
Torino	4–0	6–2	5–0	2–0	5–2	2–1	4–1	3–1	2–1	4–1	—	7–0
Udinese	3–2	1–7	3–3	2–1	3–3	3–4	2–2	3–1	0–2	1–2	4–3	—

Legend: Blue = home team win; Yellow = draw; Red = away team win.

==== Group B ====
===== Classification =====
P	Team	Pld	W	D	L	GF	GA	GD	Pts	Promotion or relegation
1.	Juventus	22	17	3	2	68	14	+54	37	Qualified to the final
2.	Cremonese	22	13	3	6	41	25	+16	29	
3.	Genoa	22	13	2	7	48	29	+19	28	
4.	Padova	22	11	3	8	55	33	+22	25	
5.	Livorno	22	11	3	8	43	45	−2	25	
6.	Sampierdarenese	22	10	3	9	38	43	−5	23	
7.	Pro Vercelli	22	9	4	9	42	31	+11	22	
8.	Milan	22	10	2	10	43	39	+4	22	
9.	Reggiana	22	7	3	12	30	50	−20	17	Qualifications to the National Division
10.	Alessandria	22	7	2	13	41	48	−7	16	Qualifications to the National Division
11.	Parma	22	5	2	15	23	58	−35	12	Qualifications to the National Division
12.	Mantova	22	2	4	16	24	81	−57	8	Qualifications to the National Division

===== Results table =====
Home \ Away	ALE	CRE	GEN	JUV	LIV	MAN	MIL	PAD	PAR	PRO	REG	SAM
Alessandria	—	2–3	1–0	1–3	1–0	9–0	4–3	0–2	2–0	1–1	6–0	5–0
Cremonese	3–0	—	1–0	0–0	8–0	2–0	1–0	2–1	3–0	4–2	1–0	2–1
Genoa	7–2	2–1	—	1–3	0–0	3–1	2–1	2–0	3–0	2–1	3–0	3–1
Juventus	4–0	4–0	2–0	—	3–0	8–1	6–0	3–2	6–0	2–1	5–0	4–0
Livorno	6–2	2–1	3–2	1–1	—	6–1	1–1	3–0	4–0	2–0	2–0	5–1
Mantova	7–1	0–0	2–5	0–5	0–2	—	0–2	0–2	1–1	2–2	3–0	1–1
Milan	2–2	1–4	1–3	1–2	4–1	3–1	—	3–0	4–2	4–0	4–0	2–0
Padova	1–0	1–1	2–0	2–2	6–1	9–0	4–2	—	6–1	5–2	6–2	3–0
Parma	1–0	3–1	1–5	0–3	0–1	5–3	1–2	2–0	—	0–3	2–0	1–3
Pro Vercelli	1–0	4–0	2–0	0–1	7–0	3–0	3–1	1–1	2–2	—	3–0	2–0
Reggiana	2–1	0–2	2–2	2–0	5–2	4–0	0–1	4–1	2–0	3–2	—	1–1
Sampierdarenese	2–1	2–1	2–3	2–1	2–1	8–1	2–1	2–1	4–1	1–0	3–3	—

Legend: Blue = home team win; Yellow = draw; Red = away team win.

=== Finals ===
Team 1	Agg.	Team 2	1st leg	2nd leg
Bologna	● 2 points each ●	Juventus	2–2	0–0

Tie-break
Played on 1 August 1926, in Milan.

Team 1	Score	Team 2
Bologna	1–2	Juventus

Juventus qualified for the National Finals.

== Southern League ==
The Southern League was a separate amatorial league, still divided in five regions. The winner were Alba Rome.

== National Finals ==
1st leg Date: 8 August 1926, 2nd leg Date: 22 August 1926

Team 1	Agg.	Team 2	1st leg	2nd leg
Juventus	12–1	Alba Roma	7–1	5–0

== Top goalscorers ==
Rank	Player	Club	Goals
1	(Hungary) Ferenc Hirzer	Juventus	35
2	(Italy) Angelo Schiavio	Bologna	28
3	(Italy) Pietro Pastore	Juventus	26
4	(Hungary) Márton Bukovi	Alba Roma	25
5	(Italy) Ernesto Ghisi	Internaples	20
5	(Italy) Adolfo Baloncieri	Torino	20
7	(Italy) Giovanni Ferrari	Internaples	16

== Qualification to the National Division ==
=== Round 1 ===
Played on 29 August

Team 1	Score	Team 2
Alessandria	6–1	Pisa
Legnano	2–0	Udinese
Mantova	7–3	Reggiana
Novara	4–0	Parma

=== Round 2 ===
Played on 5 September

Team 1	Score	Team 2
Alessandria	4–1	Legnano
Mantova	3–4	Novara

=== Round 3 ===
Played on 12 September

Team 1	Score	Team 2
Alessandria	2–2	Novara

Repetition

Played on 19 September in Turin

Team 1	Score	Team 2
Alessandria	3–1	Novara

Alessandria was qualified to the National Division.

== References and sources ==
- Almanacco Illustrato del Calcio – La Storia 1898–2004, Panini Edizioni, Modena, September 2005
