= Divisione Nazionale =

Former Italian Football Championship

Divisione Nazionale (National Division) was the name of the first level of the Italian Football Championship from 1926 to 1929.

== History ==
The competition was the evolution of former Prima Divisione (First Division) which had two main problems: it was divided between the northern and the southern part of the country, and was formally faithful to the amatorial directories of FIFA. The fascist regime would not accept a championship based on local groups, so in 1926 it took the direct control of FIGC with Leandro Arpinati as president, who merged two Roman clubs and newborn Napoli into the Milan-based Northern League, which consequently changed its name into Direttorio Divisioni Superiori (Directory of Higher Divisions), and it formed a Prima Divisione Sud championship (Southern First Division) which would promote a southern club into the renamed Divisione Nazionale every year. Players' purchase and salary were also allowed, even if Italian football did not officially turn into a professional system until 1960.

Divisione Nazionale was based, as previous Lega Nord, on two groups, now composed of only ten clubs each, the best teams playing a final group for the scudetto. In 1927, the championship was provisionally enlarged to 22 clubs, due to the re-admittance of A.S. Roma and S.S.C. Napoli, which had been formally relegated at the end of the 1926–27 campaign. In 1928, Arpinati decided a historical reform, which lasts still today, creating the new Serie A and Serie B, even if, for a transitional year, the two series had still to be played merged in a last Divisione Nazionale season.

== Winners ==
Year	Winner	Runners-up	Top scorer (club) (goals)
1926–27	no winner (title revoked to Torino)	Bologna	(Austria) Anton Powolny (Ambrosiana) (22)
1927–28	Torino	Genoa	(Italy) Julio Libonatti (Torino) (35)
1928–29	Bologna	Torino	(Italy) Gino Rossetti (Torino) (36)
1945–46	Torino	Juventus	(Italy) Guglielmo Gabetto (Torino) (22)

== See also ==
- Italian Football Championship
- Prima Divisione
- Serie A
