= ASD OltrepòVoghera =

Italian football club

OltrepòVoghera
- Full name: Associazione Sportiva Dilettantistica OltrepòVoghera
- Nickname: OltreVoghe
- Founded: 2001
- Dissolved: 2019
- Ground: Stadio Giovanni Parisi, Voghera
- Capacity: 4,700
Home colours	Away colours

Associazione Sportiva Dilettantistica OltrepòVoghera, usually referred to as simply OltrepòVoghera, was an Italian association football team from Stradella and Voghera Lombardy.

== History ==
=== Foot-Ball Club Casteggio Broni ===
The club was founded in 2001 as Foot-Ball Club Casteggio Broni in Casteggio, Lombardy, after the merger with F.C. Casteggio and A.C. Broni. Its colors were yellow and blue.

=== A.S.D. S.B.C. Oltrepò ===
At the end of the 2008–09 Serie D season, the club, in financial difficulties, moved to the city of Stradella and merged with Società Ginnastica Stradellina (founded in 2006 and direct heir of Oltrepò Calcio, that played in Serie C2 in the '80s), changing its denomination in A.S.D. S.B.C. Oltrepò.

=== A.S.D. OltrepòVoghera ===
In the summer 2013 the club merged with A.S. Accademia Team Anni Verdi Voghera and was renamed with the current name. In the 2013–14 season it was promoted to Serie D.

OltrepoVoghera went on playing in Serie D until 2019, when it was relegated to Eccellenza Lombardia. After that, the club was sold to businessman Oreste Cavaliere, who decided to rename it A.S.D. AVC Vogherese 1919, to re-create Voghera's historic football club.

== Colors and badge ==
The colors of the team were light blue, white, red and black.

== Honours ==
- Coppa Italia Dilettanti
  - Winners: 1976–77
