= Prima Divisione =

Former Italian Football Championship

Prima Divisione (First Division) was the name of the first level of the Italian Football Championship from 1921 to 1926. The competition was initially founded in opposition to the FIGC by the richest clubs of Northern Italy, which disagreed the old format of the championship, based on regional groups. In 1921–22, two concurrent championships took place, before FIGC accepted the new format for 1922–23.

== History ==
The Prima Divisione was divided in two leagues: Lega Nord (Northern League) and Lega Sud (Southern League). The Lega Nord championship was the main competition, and it was divided in two groups of twelve teams each. The winners of the two groups qualified for the final (Northern League Final) while the last teams were relegated in Seconda Divisione (Second Division). The Lega Sud championship was still divided in many regional groups; the best two teams of Campania, Lazio and Apulia and the winners of the Sicily and Marches groups qualified for the semifinals (Southern League Semifinals) of two groups. The winners of the semifinals advanced to the final. The winners of the two leagues qualified for the Finalissima (literally The Biggest Final). The team that won the national final won the scudetto, firstly introduced for the 1923-24 champions Genoa.

Because of the fascist Viareggio Charter, in 1926 the Prima Divisione championship was renamed as Divisione Nazionale (National Division), merging the best southern clubs into the Northern League. The second level of the Italian football consequently took the name of Prima Divisional, as it happened in England in 1992. In 1929 with the creation of the Serie A and Serie B championships the Prima Divisione became the third level of the Italian Football. In 1935 with the creation of the Serie C championship the Prima Divisione became the fourth level of the Italian football. In 1948 with the creation of the Promozione championship the first division became the fifth level of the Italian championship. In 1952 with the creation of the IV Serie championship the Prima Divisione became the sixth level. In 1959 the Prima Divisione championship was replaced by local Prima Categoria, Seconda Categoria and Terza Categoria championships.

== Winners ==
Year	Winner	Runners-up	Top scorer (club) (goals)
1921–22	Pro Vercelli	Fortitudo Roma	
1922–23	Genoa	Lazio	
1923–24	Genoa	Savoia	(Hungary) Heinrich Schoenfeld (Torino) (22)
1924–25	Bologna	Alba Roma	(Italy) Mario Magnozzi (Livorno) (19)
1925–26	Juventus	Alba Roma	(Hungary) Ferenc Hirzer (Juventus) (35)

=== Winners (Lega Nord) ===
Year	Winner	Runners-up	Top scorer (club) (goals)
1921–22	Pro Vercelli	Genoa	
1922–23	Genoa	Pro Vercelli	
1923–24	Genoa	Bologna	(Hungary) Heinrich Schoenfeld (Torino) (22)
1924–25	Bologna	Genoa	(Italy) Mario Magnozzi (Livorno) (19)
1925–26	Juventus	Bologna	(Hungary) Ferenc Hirzer (Juventus) (31)

=== Winners (Lega Sud) ===
Year	Winner	Runners-up	Top scorer (club) (goals)
1921–22	Fortitudo Roma	Puteolana	
1922–23	Lazio	Savoia	
1923–24	Savoia	Alba Roma	Fulvio Bernardini (Lazio) (19)
1924–25	Alba Roma	Anconitana	Fulvio Bernardini (Lazio) (16)
1925–26	Alba Roma	Internaples	Bukovich (Alba Roma) (25)

== North League ==
=== Founding members ===
Club	Appearances in First Division	Appearances in Second Division	League left
Alessandria	5	-	-
Andrea Doria	5	-	-
Brescia	5	-	-
Bologna	5	-	-
Casale	5	-	-
Genoa	5	-	-
Internazionale	5	-	-
Juventus	5	-	-
Legnano	5	-	-
Livorno	5	-	-
Mantova	4	1	-
Milan	5	-	-
US Milanese	2	3	-
Modena	5	-	-
Novara	5	-	-
Padova	5	-	-
Pisa	5	-	-
Pro Vercelli	5	-	-
Savona	2	3	-
Spezia	4	1	-
Torino	5	-	-
Venezia	1	4	-
Verona	5	-	-
Vicenza	1	3	left in 1923–24

=== FIGC joining clubs ===
Club	Appearances in First Division	Appearances in Second Division	League left
Cremonese	4	-	-
Esperia Como	1	2	left in 1925
Lucchese	1	3	-
Novese	2	2	-
Pastore Torino	1	1	left in 1924
Petrarca Padova	1	3	-
Rivarolese	1	3	-
Sampierdarenese	4	-	-
Spal	1	3	-
Speranza Savona	1	3	-
U.S. Torinese	1	1	left in 1924
Udinese	2	2	-
Virtus Bologna	2	1	left in 1925

=== Promoted clubs ===
Club	Appearances in First Division	Appearances in Second Division	League left
Derthona (from CCI)	2	3	-
Reggiana (from FIGC)	2	2	-
Parma (from FIGC)	1	3	-

== See also ==
- Divisione Nazionale
- Serie A
