= SS Maceratese 1922 =

Italian football club

Maceratese
- Full name: Associazione Calcio Dilettantistica S.S. Maceratese 1922
- Nicknames: Rata; Pistacoppi
- Founded: 1922; 2009 (refounded); 2018 (revived as SS Maceratese)
- Ground: Stadio Helvia Recina, Macerata
- Capacity: 5,846
- League: Serie D - Group F
- 2022-23: Eccellenza Marche, 10th
- Website: http://www.ssmaceratese1922.it/
Home colours	Away colours

Società Sportiva Maceratese S.r.l. (formerly Associazione Calcio Maceratese S.r.l. and Fulgor Maceratese S.r.l.) was an Italian football club located in Macerata in the Marche region. The club folded in 2017. Since 2018, another club, S.S. Maceratese 1922 (incorporated as Associazione Calcio Dilettantistica S.S. Maceratese 1922), became a successor, which use the same logo and color.

== History ==
=== From U.C. Maceratese to A.C. Maceratese ===
The club was founded in 1922 as U.C. Maceratese after the merger of the four main teams in the city: Helvia Recina, Macerata, Robur Macerata and Virtus Macerata.

In the summer 2001 it has changed its name to A.C. Maceratese.

In 2009 the club went bankrupt.

=== From Fulgor Maceratese to S.S. Maceratese ===
Thanks to Article 52 of N.O.I.F., in the summer 2009 the club was refounded as Fulgor Maceratese S.r.l. in Eccellenza Marche.

In the summer 2010 it has changed its name with the current denomination: Società Sportiva Maceratese.

In the season 2011–12 the club was promoted to Serie D after have won Eccellenza Marche.

The club promoted to Lega Pro in 2015. However, during 2015–16 season Commissione di Vigilanza sulle Società di Calcio (Co.Vi.So.C.) found the club had a capital shortfall of €245,667 and other financial overdue. Initially could not renew the license to the professional league, the club won the appeal on 19 July 2016.

The club did not enter 2017–18 Serie C and folded.

== Phoenix club ==
It was reported that another club, Associazione Calcio Dilettantistica Helvia Recina Maceratese (or known as H.R. Maceratese), claimed as a successor since 2018. The club named after Helvia Recina.

In 2019 that club was renamed to Associazione Calcio Dilettantistica S.S. Maceratese 1922. The club also acquired the rights to use the colour and logo of the original club in the same year.

== Colors and badge ==
Its colors are white and red.
