= AC Meda 1913 =

Italian football club

Meda fullname = Associazione Sportiva Dilettantistica Meda 1913
- Founded: 1913 (as Associazione Calcio Meda 1913); 1936 (refounded); 2004 (refounded); 2010 (refounded)
- Ground: Città di Meda
- Capacity: 3,000
- Chairman: Luigi Cairoli
- Manager: Giovanni Sannino
- League: Seconda Categoria Under 21 Lombardy/G
- 2011–12: Seconda Categoria Under 21/A Lombardy/G, 2nd
Home colours	Away colours

AC Meda 1913 is an Italian association football company based in Meda (MB), Lombardy Italy. It currently plays in Seconda Categoria Under 21 Lombardy group G.

== History ==
The club was founded in 1913 as Associazione Calcio Meda 1913 and refounded several times, the last, with the current name, on June 17, 2010, deciding to address only the youth sector, but there is a first team football.

=== A.S.D. Meda 1913 ===
The most important team of the company is the A.S.D. Meda 1913 that, in the season 2010–11, was promoted from Terza Categoria Under 21 group A to Seconda Categoria Under 21.

== Colors and badge ==
The team's colors are black and white, as those its municipality.

== Stadium ==
The team plays its home matches at the Città di Meda in Meda, which has a capacity of 3,000.
