= Fortitudo-Pro Roma SGS =

Italian sports society

Fortitudo-Pro Roma
- Full name: Fortitudo-Pro Roma Società di Ginnastica e Scherma
- Nickname: I Leoni di Borgo
- Founded: 1908
- Dissolved: 7 June 1927
- Ground: Campo "Madonna del Riposo"
- Capacity: unknown
- League: Italian Football Championship
- 1925–26: Lega Sud, Semifinals, 2nd Girone A
Home colours	Away colours

Fortitudo-Pro Roma Società di Ginnastica e Scherma was an Italian sports society founded in 1908 as Fortitudo in Rome, in Rione Borgo, and with seat in Piazza Adriana. Particularly famous was its football section, an Italian football club also founded in 1908. The club is most noted for competing in the early Italian Football Championship competitions, before in 1927 becoming one of three Rome based clubs merging to form AS Roma.

The society and the team were founded by some friars from the Brothers of Our Lady of Mercy order, who since 1859 ran the Pontificia Scuola Pio IX, one of the most ancient schools in Rome. Fortitudo (in English Courage or Fortitude) is in fact the name of one of the four cardinal Virtues of the Catholic tradition, and is a popular name in Italy for sport teams founded by religious organizations.

In 1926 Fortitudo merged with Pro Roma to form Fortitudo–Pro Roma, just one year before merging into AS Roma.

== Honours ==
Italian Football Championship:

- Southern Champions: 1921–22
