= Ilva Bagnolese =

Italian football club

Bagnolese
- Full name: Ilva Bagnolese
- Founded: 1909; 117 years ago
- Dissolved: 1960; 66 years ago
- Ground: Campo Ilva Bagnoli, Bagnoli, Naples
- Capacity: 8,000
- League: Serie D
- 1959–60: Group F, 14th
Home colours	Away colours

Ilva Bagnolese was an Italian football club from the Bagnoli area of Naples. The club is most noted for competing in the early Italian Football Championship competitions during the 1920s, after that period they began to decline spending the 1940s in Serie C.

The last season of Ilva Bagnolese was played out in Serie D where they were relegated to Prima Categoria. Instead of going through with the relegation they merged with Ischia Isolaverde in 1960.
