= SSD Savoia 1908 FC =

Association football club in Italy

Savoia
- Full name: Savoia 1908
- Nicknames: Bianchi (Whites), Oplontini, Torresi
- Founded: 1908; 2015 as Oplonti Pro Savoia; 2018 as US Savoia 1908; 2021 as AC Savoia 1908; 2023 as Savoia 1908 FC
- Ground: Stadio Alfredo Giraud, Torre Annunziata, Italy
- Capacity: 10,750
- Chairman: Arcangelo Sessa
- Manager: Alessandro Formisano
- League: Serie C Group C
- 2025–26: Serie D Group I, 1st of 18 (promoted)
- Website: savoia1908.it
Home colours	Away colours	Third colours

Savoia 1908 S.S.D. a r.l. (commonly referred to as Savoia) is an Italian football club based in Torre Annunziata, in the Metropolitan City of Naples, Campania. It currently plays in Serie C.

One of the oldest clubs in Southern Italy, the original white-shielded club was established on 21 November 1908 by a group of local flour-mill and pasta-factory industrialists, with the support of members of Torre Annunziata’s middle class. The club colors are white, the color of the raw material that dominated the local economy at the time—flour. The club’s badge is a stylised version of the coat of arms of the House of Savoy, and its home matches are played at the Alfredo Giraud Stadium. The official Savoia anthem is "L'inno al Savoia," written by F. Manfredi and D. Ausiello in 1933.

In the 1923–24 season Savoia were crowned champions of Central-Southern Italy and competed in the final for the national title. The club has taken part in five top-tier seasons prior to the introduction of the round-robin tournament and four second-tier seasons, three of which were in Serie B. Between 1944 and 1955 the club was known as Torrese.

== History ==
=== From foundation to the post-war years ===
On 21 November 1908 a group of industrialists from Torre Annunziata’s flour-milling and pasta-making sector founded Unione Sportiva Savoia in the town. Ciro Ilardi became the first president, while the founding members included Italo Moretti, Leonida Bertone and Willy Fornari, the latter also serving as the first coach. The origin of the name remains uncertain. One theory links it to the battle cry of the Savoyard troops – Avanti Savoia! – with which several of the founders had fought for the Royal House. Another hypothesis is that it is a tribute to the ruling family. A third claims the club was founded in the Savoia cinema-theatre in Torre Annunziata, whose name was then adopted.

The club joined the FIGC in 1915 and made its official debut in the 1916 Coppa Internazionale, finishing third alongside Naples, Puteoli, Bagnolese and Internazionale. During the Great War it won the Campania third-category championship. On 3 November 1919, after losing a play-off for promotion to Prima Categoria against Pro Caserta, the club entered the Promozione championship, finishing third yet gaining admission to the 1920–21 Prima Categoria following the enlargement of the leagues. During this period, Savoia merged with the town’s second team, Pro Italia, and on 13 June 1920 the Campo Oncino was inaugurated.

In its first two top-flight seasons the club failed to progress beyond the regional phase, finishing third and then second under coaches Alfredo Fornari and later Carlo Garozzo. Subsequently, under the ownership of the Voiello company, Savoia enjoyed its first and most successful golden era, winning three consecutive Campania regional titles, the championship of Central-Southern Italy and contesting the 1924 national finals against Genoa. Until then Central-Southern champions had always suffered heavy defeats against northern clubs, but after an honourable 3–1 loss in the first leg, Savoia made history in the return leg by drawing 1–1 against Genoa, becoming the first Central-Southern club to remain unbeaten in a match against a northern side. The coach during that three-year period was Raffaele Di Giorgio, assisted by Wisbar in the final two seasons. The line-up of the runners-up of Italy was: Visciano; Nebbia, Lobianco; Cassese, Gaia, Borghetto; Orsini, Ghisi I, Bobbio, Mombelli, Maltagliati.

Financial difficulties subsequently forced president Teodoro Voiello to relinquish control, effectively suspending the club’s national activity. After the 1926–27 Seconda Divisione, lost only in a play-off against Terni, the club was nevertheless promoted to Prima Divisione by the Direttorio Divisioni Superiori for sporting merit following the enlargement of the leagues. The financial crisis worsened after an attempted match-fixing incident against Fiorentina, for which the FIGC imposed a 4,500-lire fine that led to bankruptcy and a further one-year hiatus, compounded by the closure of the historic Campo Oncino. Following these events, the Campo Formisano was inaugurated in 1929.

From the 1930s – during the first half of which the club was known as Fascio Sportivo Savoia – the team competed regularly in Serie C until the post-war period, except for the two-year spell of 1936–38 when it was renamed first Associazione Calcio Torre Annunziata and then Spolettificio Torre Annunziata. Effectively a military side composed mainly of players undertaking national service at the local barracks, it dominated its league, winning fourteen matches and drawing one in sixteen games to regain Serie C. The signing of Enrico Colombari, who ended his playing career in Torre Annunziata and started his coaching career there, helped the team earn second place in 1938–39 behind Fulvio Bernardini’s MATER; then, under coach Osvaldo Sacchi, the club achieved its best-ever Coppa Italia result, reaching the round of 32 in 1939; later, with Ruggero Zanolla, it finished fifth in 1940–41 and third in 1942–43.

In 1944, for political reasons, the club abandoned both the Savoy coat of arms and the name Savoia, becoming first Ilva Torrese and then Unione Sportiva Torrese. During the final years of World War II it participated in the 1944 Coppa della Liberazione and the 1945 Campionato Campano, finishing second and ninth respectively. When league football resumed, Torrese placed fourth in 1945–46 and, thanks to the withdrawals of Benevento and Gladiator, earned its first-ever promotion to Serie B. Under president Carotenuto, coach Dario Compiani and the attacking trio of Calleri, Ghezzi and Rossi, the team finished sixth in 1946–47, still the highest position achieved by the white-shielded club since the introduction of the round-robin tournament. With the reduction of the leagues, twelfth place in 1948 meant relegation to Serie C. From that year the club began to weaken, entering a slow decline that saw four relegations against just one promotion, culminating in bankruptcy in 1955, the same year the Campo Formisano – home to the whites for roughly a quarter of a century – was closed.

=== 1955–2000 ===
After the 1955 refounding the club reverted to its former name Unione Sportiva Savoia, but the lack of a home ground and chronic shortage of funds ushered in a dark decade without significant successes. After years playing on fields across the province of Naples, the municipal stadium was finally inaugurated on 25 January 1962 and, two years later, the club was renamed the Associazione Polisportiva Savoia. Under coach Bruno Pesaola in the first year and the duo Spartano–Lopez in the second, the club won two consecutive championships and returned to Serie C in 1965. It failed to stay up, however, despite a respectable campaign that left it one point above the relegation zone with six matches remaining, only for six straight defeats to wipe out the advantage. Relegation followed after a 2–0 play-off loss to Nardò.

Relegated again to Serie D, Savoia played four highly competitive seasons, finishing second twice – in 1967 a point behind Giuseppe Wilson’s Internapoli and in 1968 behind Matera – before winning the league in 1970 at the expense of historic rivals Turris. After a solid first year back in Serie C, new financial problems triggered a double relegation; only D’Amelio’s intervention saved the club from bankruptcy. With Gioacchino Coppola as president, the team promptly returned to Serie D. Under businessman Franco Immobile the club enjoyed both economic stability and consistent results, culminating in a 1978 play-off for the newly created Serie C2. Despite the defeat, the FIGC readmitted the Oplontini due to their sporting merit, returning them to professional football. That year the club added the foundation year to its name, becoming Associazione Calcio Savoia 1908. After two excellent fifth- and fourth-place finishes and one mid-table result, the team was relegated to the Interregionale in 1982, remaining there for eight consecutive seasons, six of which were under President Michele Gallo.

The acquisition by the Farinelli family laid the foundations for a new successful cycle that lasted until the new millennium. In 1989, under president Pasquale Farinelli, Savoia won promotion to Serie C2 after a season-long battle with Stabia, the first promotion in fifteen years. An inconsistent 1993 campaign forced another play-out, this time against Licata. The Sicilians – who had reached the play-out after a draw with Monopoli later revealed to involve sporting fraud – won, but in the summer the Campanians were readmitted to professional football due to a series of bankruptcies in C1 and C2. The club retained its status until 1995. With the Farinellis’ departure and limited resources, new president Viglione entrusted the technical area to a young Luigi De Canio, who secured the team's safety in his first year before winning promotion to Serie C1 in 1995, defeating Matera 2–1 in the play-off final at Foggia’s Zaccheria.

At the end of that season businessman Mario Moxedano purchased the club from Franco Salvatore and cleared its debts. The ambitious president invested heavily in the transfer market, bringing to Torre Annunziata players such as Carruezzo, De Rosa, Porchia, Marasco and Veronese, and succeeded in returning the club to Serie B after more than half a century. Promotion was narrowly missed in 1997 when Savoia lost the play-off final 1–0 to Ancona. It was achieved in 1999: having qualified for the play-offs from the last available spot and starting as underdogs, Osvaldo Jaconi’s side first eliminated Palermo in a double-legged semi-final and then local rivals Juve Stabia 2–0 in the final at Avellino’s Partenio.

Despite Ghirardello’s 16 goals, the Serie B season was difficult, although it remains one of the most important post-war chapters in the club’s history: Savoia finished 19th and were relegated, yet recorded notable results such as home wins against Empoli and Sampdoria (both 1–0), an away victory (3–1) against Salernitana and draws against Napoli at the San Paolo and Brescia at the Rigamonti. The following year in C1 Savoia again attempted to reach the second division but, after an explosive start and a historic 5–1 home win over an eventually promoted Palermo, missed the promotion play-offs only on head-to-head record against Ascoli.

=== 21st century ===
At the end of the 2000–01 season president Moxedano announced the sale of the club to Sorrento businessman Antonino Pane, who quickly committed numerous financial irregularities, preventing registration for Serie C1 and causing bankruptcy. For these events Pane was later sentenced to six years in prison.

Restarting from Eccellenza after merging with historic local club Internapoli and taking the temporary name Intersavoia for one season, the club climbed back to Serie D, spending eight consecutive seasons there and losing three play-off finals between 2003 and 2007.

Relegated to Eccellenza in the club’s centenary year, Savoia collapsed financially and withdrew mid-season, suffering a second relegation in two years.

Refounded on 19 June 2010 by the directors of fellow city club Atletico Savoia (then competing in Promozione), with the approval of the mayor and the ultras, the club took the name Associazione Sportiva Dilettantistica Calcio Savoia and enrolled in the Promozione Campania for 2010–11.

On 17 February 2011 the club purchased at auction, held at the Court of Torre Annunziata, the historic trademark Associazione Calcio Savoia 1908, which had been deposited after the 2001 bankruptcy.

By winning back-to-back Promozione and Eccellenza titles, as well as a regional Coppa Italia title, the club returned to Serie D in 2012.

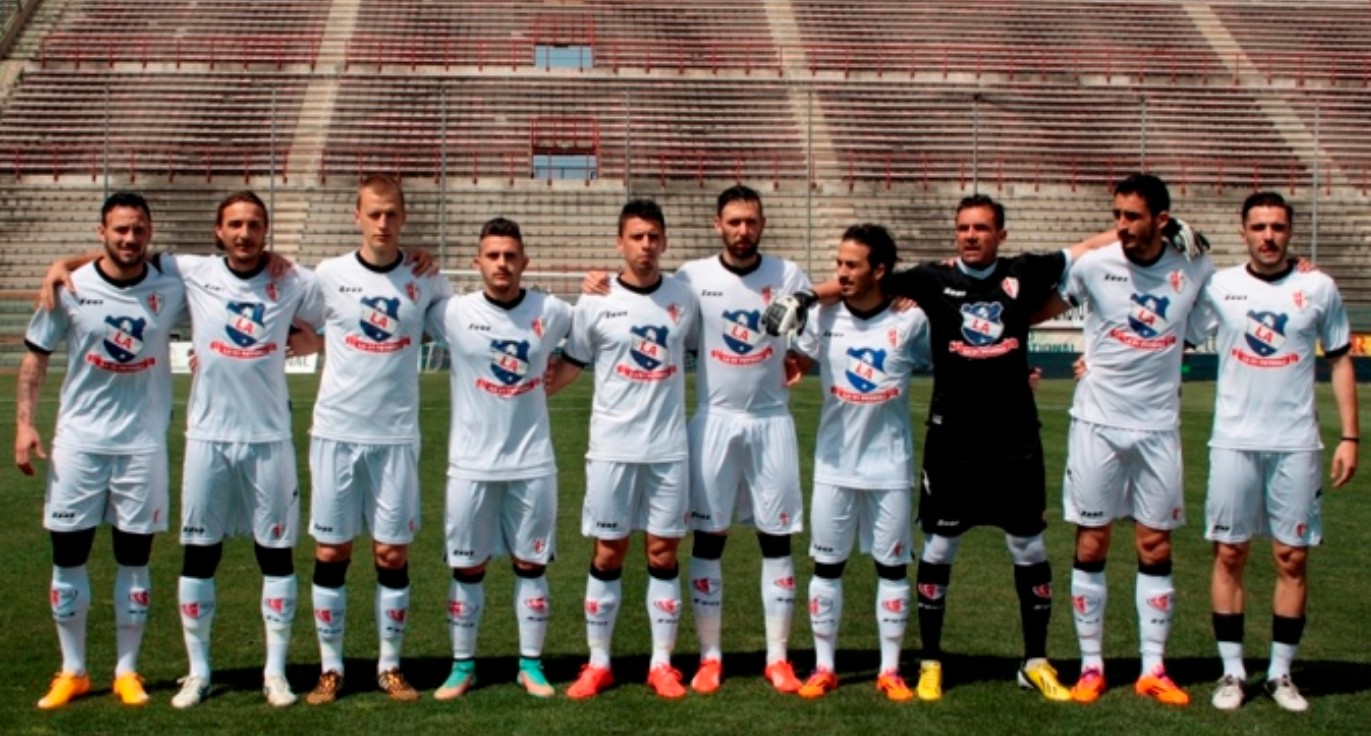
Savoia in 2014–15, the club’s most recent season in Serie C

A new ownership group led by Avellino businessmen headed by Sergio Contino took over; after a mid-table season they sold their 70% stake to entrepreneur Lazzaro Luce, who later acquired the remaining 30%. On 17 April 2014 Savoia returned to the professional ranks after a thirteen-year absence.

On 3 October 2014 the Luce family sold the club to the Consorzio Stabile Segesta led by Quirico Manca, who first led the team to on-field relegation and then to a new bankruptcy, caused in part by exorbitant wages – never paid – to the 46 registered players, resulting in expulsion from the national leagues.

Refounded through a merger between Campania and Futsal Oplonti, A.S.D. Oplonti Pro Savoia was formed, inheriting the white-shielded sporting tradition and enrolling in the 2015-2016 Eccellenza Campania.

Under president Antonio Nuzzo, on 30 August 2017 the club adopted the name A.S.D. Savoia 1908 and won a second regional Coppa Italia, setting the club record for goals scored in a single season (130) and earning promotion to Serie D.

In July 2018 the club passed to Alfonso Mazzamauro and reverted to the historic name U.S. Savoia 1908. On 21 November of the same year the 110th anniversary was celebrated. After two high-placed finishes (second and third), in July 2021 Mazzamauro transferred the sporting title elsewhere, causing the club to lose its right to compete in Serie D. It restarted in Eccellenza thanks to the sporting title held by new president Pellerone, who on 1 November 2022 transferred it free of charge to the supporters, who in turn handed it to new president Emanuele Filiberto of Savoy. On 9 November he presented the Casa Reale Holding SpA project, listed on the Vienna Stock Exchange, through which he acquired the club and became president on 23 November.

In the summer of 2024 the club acquired the sporting title of A.S.D. Portici 1906 and thus registered for Serie D without sporting merit.

In June 2026, 90% of the club was acquired by RoyaLand Company Ltd. from CRH Royalty S.r.l., making RoyaLand the club's majority shareholder following its promotion to Serie C.

== Timeline ==
Below is a brief timeline of Savoia 1908.

Brief timeline of A.S.D. Savoia 1908 S.S.D.
1908 – Foundation of Unione Sportiva Savoia.; 1915–1916 – U.S. Savoia club joins the F.I.G.C..; 1919–1920 – 3rd in Group B of the Promozione Campania. Promoted by decree to Prima Categoria.; 1920–1921 – Wins the Coppa Giordano.; 1922–1923 – 1st in the Campania group of Prima Divisione. Runner-up in the Southern League.; Campania Champion.: 1923–1924 – 1st in the Campania group of Prima Divisione. Loses the national finals.; Campania Champion. Southern League Champion.: 1924–1925 – 1st in the Campania group of Prima Divisione.; Campania Champion.: 1926–1927 – 1st in Group C of the Southern Seconda Divisione. 2nd in the Southern final group after losing a playoff. Promoted to Prima Divisione by the Federation.; 1927–1928 – 7th in Group D of Prima Divisione. Withdraws during the season, after twelve matchdays, due to severe financial problems caused by the Savoia-Fiorentina case, which led to the club's bankruptcy.; 1929–1930 – 1st in Campania Group B of Terza Divisione. 1st in the Campania final group of Terza Divisione. Initially promoted to Seconda Divisione, later admitted by decree by the Federation to Prima Divisione.; 1937–1938 – 1st in the Campania group of Prima Divisione. Promoted to Serie C.; Wins the Coppa Campania. Wins the Targa Capocci.: 1944 – Changes its name to Torrese for political reasons.; 1945–1946 – 4th in Group D of the Centro-Sud National League Serie C. Promoted to Serie B by the F.I.G.C. for having kept the club alive even during the war.; 1947–1948 – 12th in Group C of Serie B. Relegated to Serie C.; 1950–1951 – 19th in Group D of Serie C. Relegated to Promozione.; 1955 – Returns to the name U.S. Savoia.; 1964–1965 – 1st in Group F of Serie D. Promoted to Serie C.; 1965–1966 – 17th in Group C of Serie C. Relegated to Serie D after losing a playoff.; 1969–1970 – 1st in Group G of Serie D. Promoted to Serie C.; 1970 – The club is awarded by the C.O.N.I. the Silver Star for Sporting Merit.; 1971–1972 – 20th in Group C of Serie C. Relegated to Serie D.; 1977–1978 – 5th in Group G of Serie D. Promoted to Serie C2 for sporting merits despite losing a playoff.; 1980 – The club is awarded by the C.O.N.I. the Bronze Star for Sporting Merit.; 1981–1982 – 16th in Group D of Serie C2. Relegated to the Campionato Interregionale due to head-to-head disadvantage against Siracusa.; 1989–1990 – 1st in Group M of the Campionato Interregionale. Promoted to Serie C2.; 1992–1993 – 16th in Group C of Serie C2. Relegated to the Campionato Nazionale Dilettanti after losing the play-outs and subsequently repêchaged.; 1994–1995 – 4th in Group C of Serie C2. Promoted to Serie C1 after winning the play-offs.; 1996–1997 – 3rd in Group B of Serie C1. Loses the promotion playoff.; 1998–1999 – 5th in Group B of Serie C1. Promoted to Serie B after winning the play-offs.; 1999–2000 – 19th in Serie B. Relegated to Serie C1.; 2000–2001 – 6th in Group B of Serie C1. At the end of the season, it was expelled for financial irregularities and removed from professional leagues.; 2003–2004 – 4th in Group G of Serie D. Loses the play-off final.; 2004–2005 – 3rd in Group G of Serie D. Loses the play-off final.; Italian Junior National Champion.: 2006–2007 – 5th in Group I of Serie D. Loses the play-off final.; 2011–2012 – Wins the Coppa Italia Dilettanti Campania (1st title).; 2013–2014 – 1st in Group I of Serie D. Promoted to Lega Pro.; 2014–2015 – 20th in Group C of Lega Pro. Relegated to Serie D.; 2017–2018 – Wins the Coppa Italia Dilettanti Campania (2nd title).; 2020–2021 – 3rd in Group G of Serie D. Loses the play-off final.; 2025-2026 – 1st in Group I of Serie D. Promoted to Serie C.

== Colours and symbols ==
=== Colours ===
When U.S. Savoia was founded in 1908, the club colors were chosen to reflect Torre Annunziata’s economy, which was dominated by flour mills and pasta factories. White was chosen because it is the color of flour, the primary raw material. The colour has remained in use ever since, with only a few exceptions. The first change occurred in May 1919, when U.S. Savoia played the Trofeo Corriere di Napoli wearing light-blue shirts. White returned soon after, only to disappear again nearly twenty years later. During the 1937–38 Prima Divisione, the team played in light blue because the club had changed its name to Spolettificio Torre Annunziata. At the end of the season, the white colors and the name U.S. Savoia were restored. The last time the club colors deviated from white was in the 1945 Campionato Campano, when light blue was worn again. Although white is the official color, black shorts and/or socks have frequently been used and have alternated over the years.

1908	1919	1920s	1930s	1937–1938	1945	1946–1947	1994–1995

Crest used in the 1920s

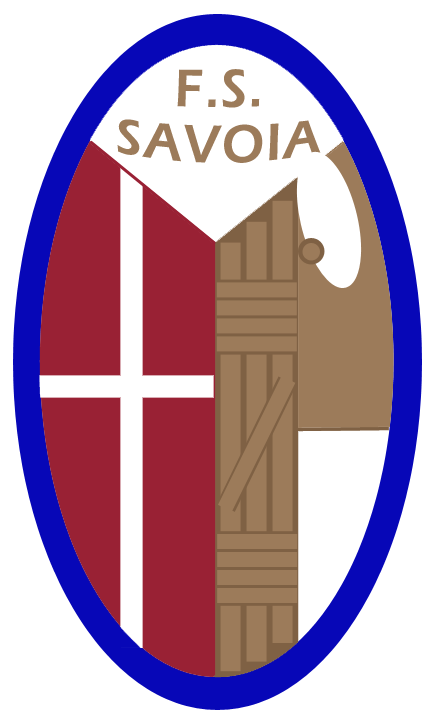
Crest used in the 1930s

Crest used in the 1937–38 season

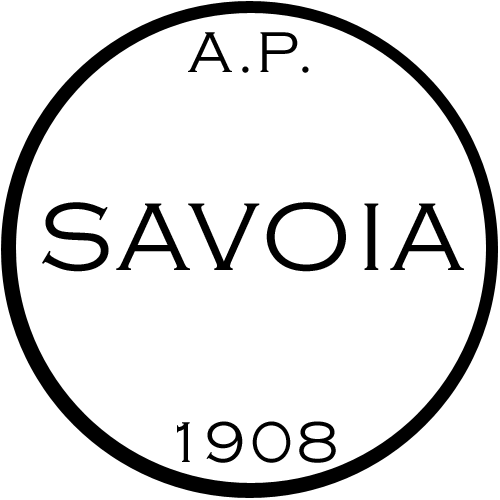
Crest used in 1968

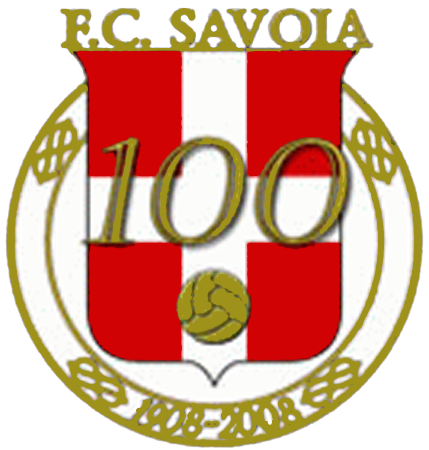
Centenary crest used in 2008

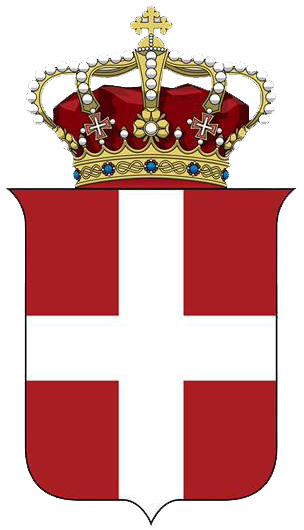
Crest used in 2018

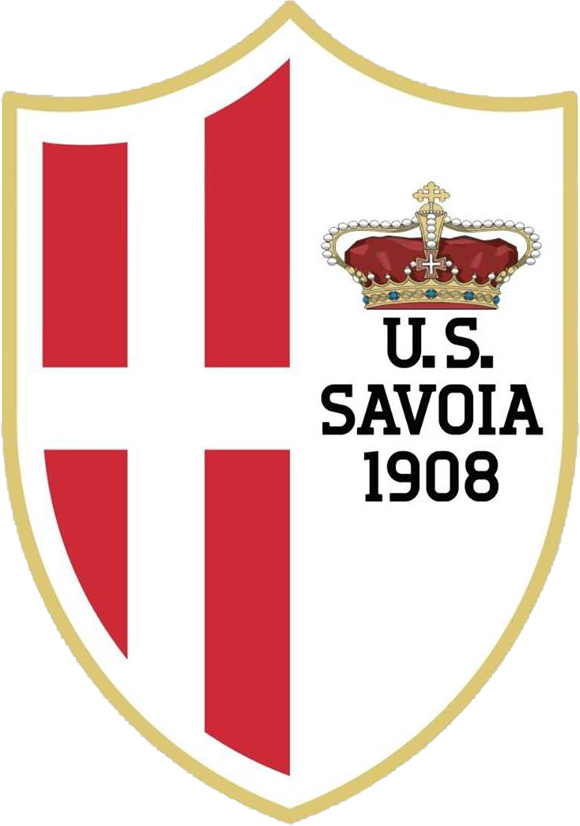
Crest used from 2019

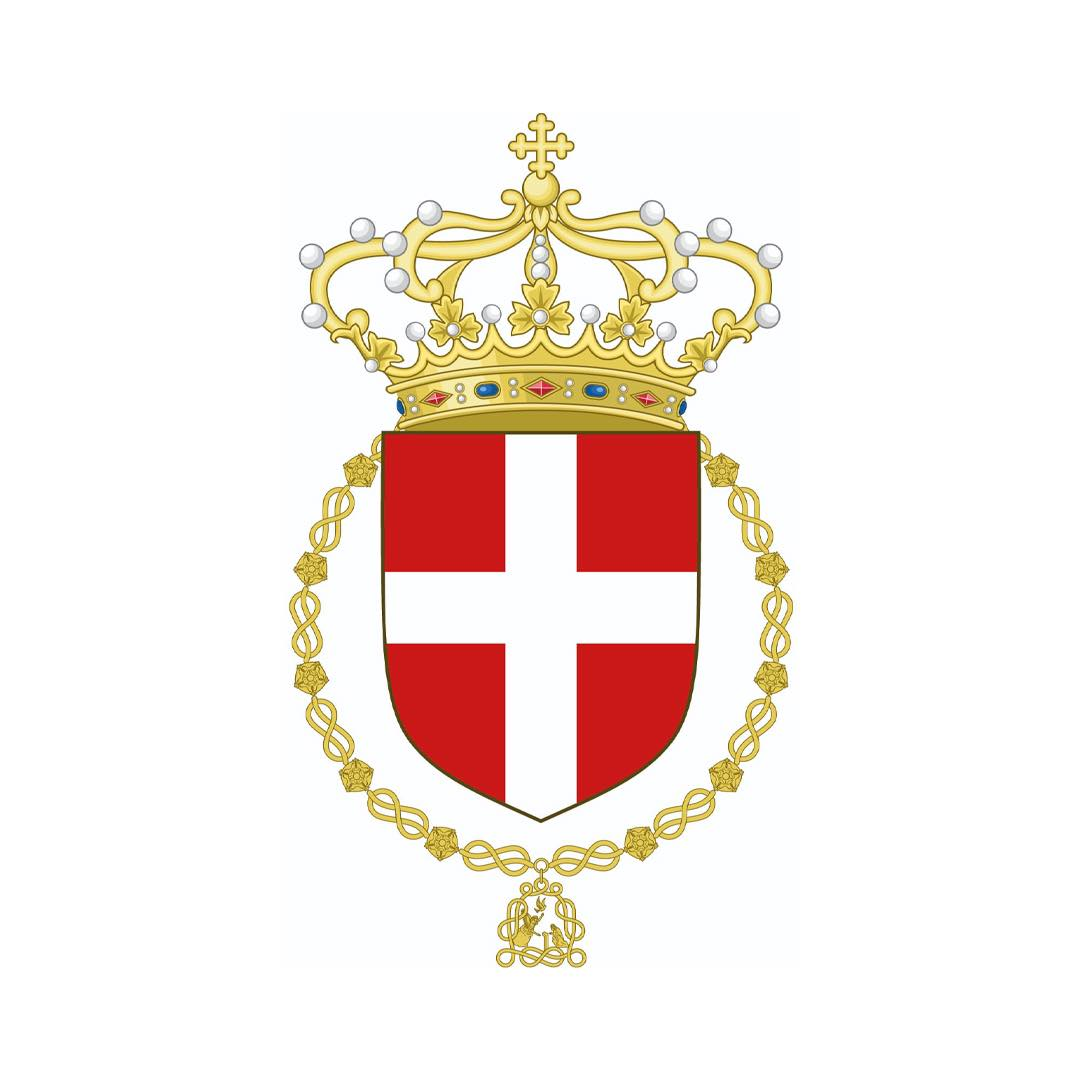
Logo in use since November 2022

=== Official symbols ===
==== Crest ====
The club’s first symbol was the coat of arms of the House of Savoy, used from the foundation in 1908 until 1930. From that year (after the name change to Fascio Sportivo Savoia) until 1936 it was accompanied by the fasces and enclosed in a blue oval. In the 1937–38 Prima Divisione season the club was called Spolettificio Torre Annunziata (being composed of soldiers from the local Royal Arms Factory) and adopted the artillery insignia as its crest. The following year the Savoy coat of arms returned, only to be abandoned in 1944 for historical-political reasons, along with the name, which became U.S. Torrese. No crest was used until 1955, when the club was refounded as U.S. Savoia and readopted the Savoy coat of arms. In 1978 a stylised shield was introduced, divided longitudinally: on the left a vivid red shield crossed in white, on the right the inscription A.C. SAVOIA 1908 in black on a white background, bordered by a brilliant gold frame with chiaroscuro highlights. This emblem has been essentially retained even after the 2015 refounding; the only changes have concerned the border (now black) and the wording on the right side, changed to OP SAVOIA.

==== Anthem ====
Se giuoca il Savoia
nessuno s'annoia…

— Chorus of the Inno al Savoia

In 1933 the Inno al Savoia was composed – a march with lyrics by Maestro F. Manfredi and music by Maestro D. Ausiello. All trace of the anthem had been lost until 2010, when it was rediscovered in an old newspaper article; with the original music and lyrics, it was rearranged and re-recorded.

== Facilities ==
=== Stadium ===
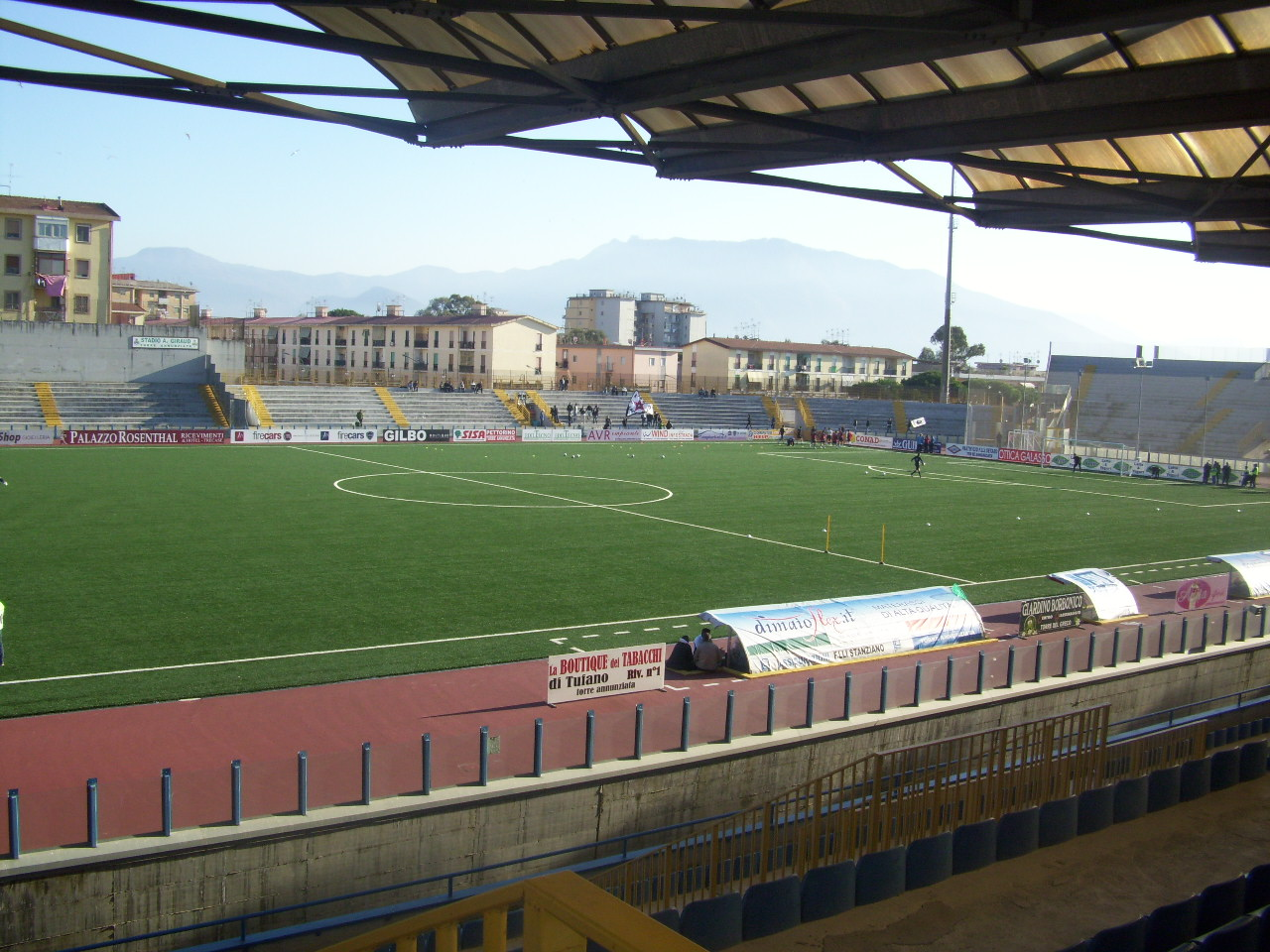
Interior of the Stadio Alfredo Giraud

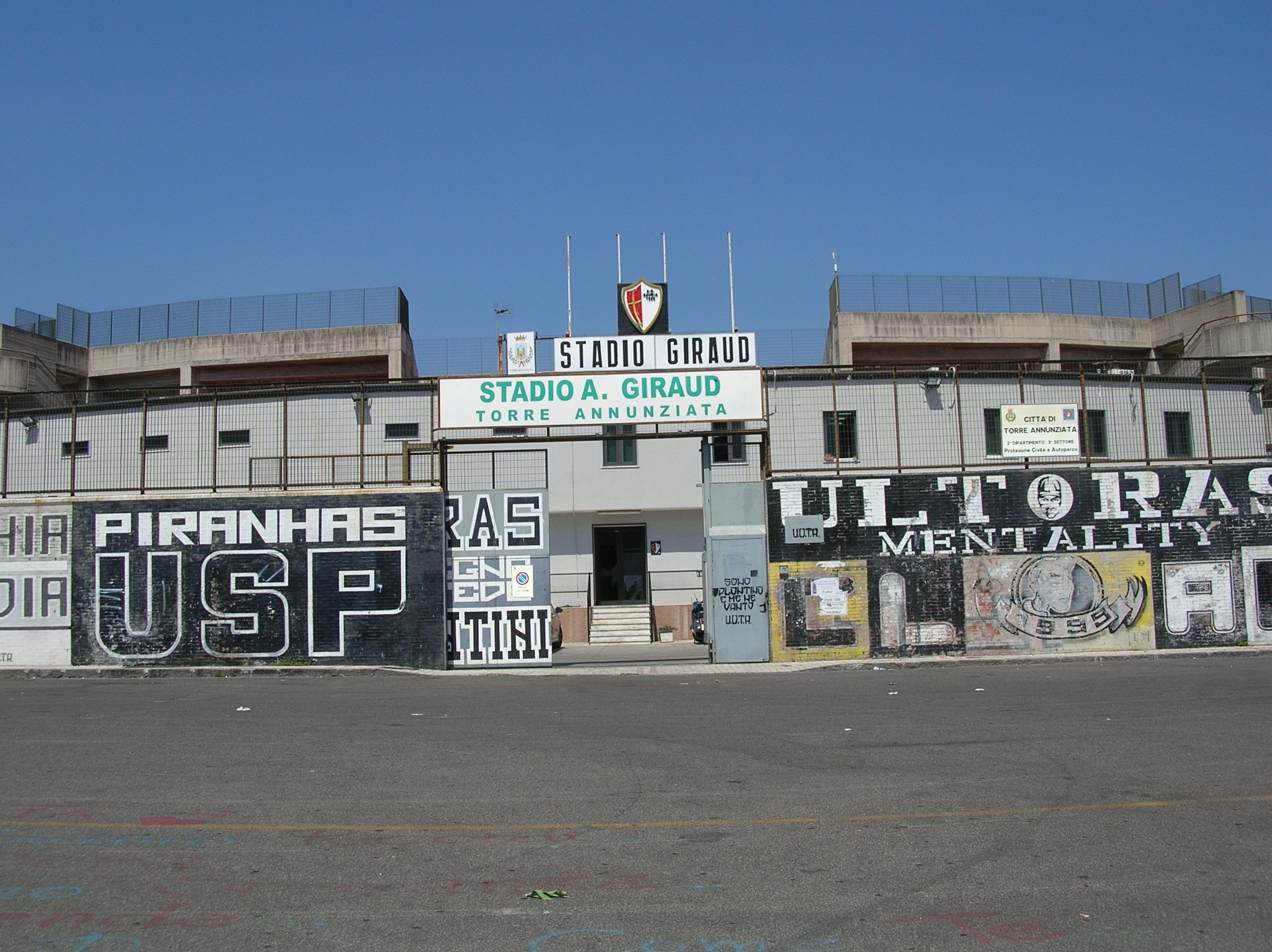
Main entrance of the stadium

The first playing field used by Savoia was called Campo Montagnelle. It measured fifty meters in length and almost thirty meters in width, with a surface that turned into quicksand on rainy days.

On 13 June 1920 the Campo Oncino was inaugurated. Memorable matches were played there, including the Savoia–Genoa of 7 September 1924 for the awarding of the scudetto.

From the 1929–30 season the club moved to the new Campo Formisano, named after the family that provided the land. It measured 101 × 60 metres and held 5,000 spectators. It effectively replaced the Campo Montagnelle.

Savoia plays its home matches at the Stadio Alfredo Giraud, inaugurated in 1962 as the Comunale. With a capacity of 12,750, in 1982 it was named after Alfredo Giraud – father of former players Raffaele, Michele and Giovanni and vice-president of the 1924 runners-up of Italy. Modernised in 1999 for the club’s Serie B promotion, it was renovated again in 2010 with the installation of latest-generation artificial turf.

=== Training ground ===
Savoia trains at the facilities of the Stadio Alfredo Giraud in Torre Annunziata.

== Organization ==
Savoia is an association comprising a president, an honorary president, a vice-president, a secretary, a treasurer and ten directors. It was established in the summer of 2011.

The club's headquarters are located on Corso Umberto I. The following is a list of the official headquarters used by Savoia throughout its history:

Chronology of official headquarters

—
- 1908 – Cinema-Teatro Savoia, where the club was founded
- 1920 – Corso Umberto I
- 1923 – Via Maresca
- 1924 – Corso Umberto I
- 1937 – Largo Fabbrica d'Armi
- 1938 – Piazza Ernesto Cesaro, 20
- 1939 – Corso Umberto I, 23
- 1940 – Via Roma, 10
- 1944 – Via Vittorio Veneto
- 1945 – Piazza Nicotera
- 1946 – Piazza Ernesto Cesaro (Bar Stella)
- 1950 – Corso Umberto I
- 1953 – Corso Vittorio Emanuele III (Circolo dell'Unione)
- 1955 – Via Zuppetta
- 1956 – Corso Umberto I, 147
- 1959 – Via Mazzini, 12
- 1961 – Corso Umberto I
- 1964 – Via Gambardella, 70 (Villa Lettieri)
- 1966 – Rampa Nunziante, 16
- 1969 – Piazzale Kennedy, 2 (later renamed Piazzale Gargiulo in 1986)
- 2010 – Corso Umberto I, 69
- 2012 – Via Tagliamonte, 2
- 2022 – Piazza Gargiulo, 2 c/o Stadio Alfredo Giraud

=== Sponsors ===
Below are the chronologies of the club’s official and technical sponsors:

Chronology of technical sponsors

- 1908–1982 None
- 1982–1992 Ennerre
- 1992–1994 Cis
- 1994–1995 Erreà
- 1995–1996 Galex
- 1996–1998 Hummel
- 1998–1999 Royal Sport
- 1999–2000 Hummel
- 2000–2001 Herod
- 2001–2002 Fly line
- 2002–2013 Legea
- 2013–2014 HS Football
- 2014–2016 Zeus
- 2016–2021 Givova
- 2021–2022 MaGma Sport
- 2022– Legea

Chronology of official sponsors

- 1908–1985 None
- 1985–1986 Immobiliare Oplonti
- 1986–1988 Oplonti Marina del sole
- 1989–1991 Big's club
- 1991–1994 La Doria
- 1994–1996 None
- 1996–1997 Oplonti Marina del sole
- 1997–1998 Telelibera 63
- 1998–1999 Edil Gamo
- 1999–2000 Challoils
- 2000–2001 Gruppo Miranda automobili
- 2001–2002 Centro Medico Oplonti
- 2002–2003 sssavoia.com official website
- 2003–2004 Napoli Canale 21
- 2004–2006 Farmacie Matachione
- 2006–2007 di Maio flex
- 2007–2008 Sterilgarda Latte è più Yogurt
- 2008–2009 Automary
- 2009–2010 None
- 2010–2011 Pasta Setaro
- 2011–2012 Pasta Setaro – Farmacie Matachione – Guidus
- 2012–2013 Sbanky Poker – Pasta Setaro – GBetSport
- 2013–2014 None
- 2014–2015 LA 91 Petroli
- 2015–2016 Cosmo Service
- 2016–2017 Sterilgarda èpiù
- 2017–2018 NORDEST Imballaggi s.r.l.
- 2018–2021 Mazzamauro International s.r.l.
- 2021–2022 CMC – Centro Medico Convenzionato
- 2023– CasaReale.it

=== Social commitment ===
The club is a member of the Oplontis Onlus non-profit consortium, which operates in the territory of the city of Torre Annunziata with the aim of protecting minors and the most vulnerable sections of society.
On 2 October 2013, represented by its president Lazzaro Luce, the club joined the awareness campaign against violence towards women organised by the "Ferma il Femminicidio" group of Torre Annunziata.

=== Youth sector ===
The Juniores team became Italian champions in the 2004–05 season.
The Savoia youth sector comprises the Allievi, Giovanissimi, Esordienti, Pulcini and Primi calci teams, which compete in their respective regional championships. All youth teams play their home matches at the Stadio Alfredo Giraud in Torre Annunziata.

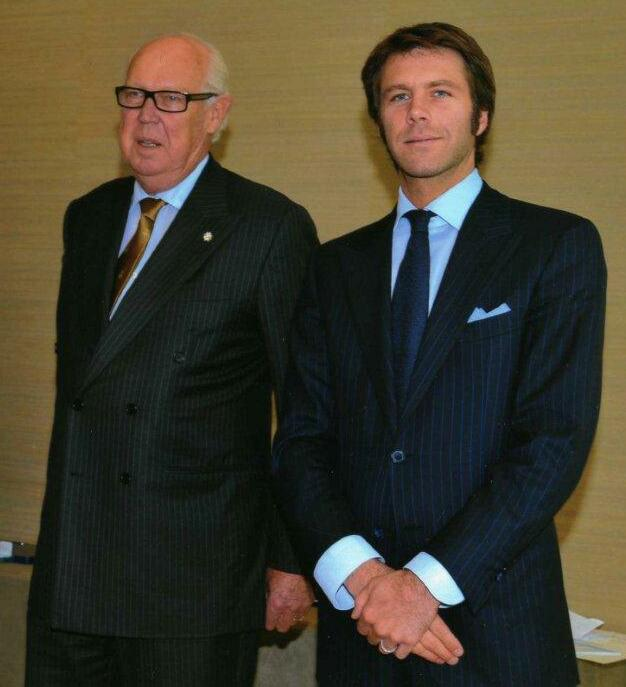
On several occasions members of the House of Savoy have paid tribute to the club for its sporting achievements.

== Presence in popular culture ==
During the 1923–24 season, Savoia became the first team from central-southern Italy to avoid defeat against a northern side.
On more than one occasion the club and representatives of the royal House of Savoy have met. In 1999, following promotion to Serie B, Prince Vittorio Emanuele wrote a letter of congratulations to the club while he was still living in exile.
In 2003, after the Savoia family returned to Italy, news emerged that the Royal House wished to purchase the Savoyard coat of arms of the bankrupt A.C. Savoia 1908, which was held by the Torre Annunziata court and was up for sale for 50,000 euros.
In 2015, club officials met Prince Emanuele Filiberto in Milan and presented him with the club's jersey.
That same year, the club's players attracted national attention when they chose to train in the public square in front of the Giraud stadium after several months of unpaid wages.
In autumn 2022, Naples' Direzione Investigativa Antimafia revealed that the club had been forced to pay a pizzo of €130,000 to local Camorra clans in order to continue its sporting activities undisturbed.

== Managers and presidents ==
Below are the chronological lists of managers and presidents since the club's foundation:

Managers
- 1915–1919 (Italy) Willy Fornari; 1919–1920 (N/A) ...; 1920–1921 (Italy) Alfredo Fornari; 1921–1922 (Italy) Carlo Garozzo; 1922–1923 (Italy) Raffaele Di Giorgio; 1923–1925 (Italy) Raffaele Di Giorgio and (Hungary) Wisbar; 1925–1926 activities suspended; 1926–1927 (Italy) Carlino; 1927–1928 (N/A) ...; 1928–1929 activities suspended; 1929–1930 (Italy) Raffaele Di Giorgio; 1930–1931 (Hungary) Lichtblau; 1931–1932 (Italy) Mario Piselli; 1932–1933 (Hungary) Emerich Hermann; 1933–1934 (Italy) Giusto Senes; 1934–1935 (Italy) Osvaldo Sacchi; 1935–1936 (Italy) Pietro Piselli (1st–20th) (Italy) Orazio Sola (21st–30th); 1936–1937 (Italy) Oscar Cirillo; 1937–1938 (Italy) Luigi De Manes; 1938–1939 (Italy) Enrico Colombari; 1939–1940 (Italy) Osvaldo Sacchi; 1940–1941 (Italy) Enrico Colombari; 1941–1943 (Italy) Ruggero Zanolla; 1945–1947 (Italy) Dario Compiani; 1947–1948 (Italy) Dario Gay; 1948–1949 (Hungary) Usbek; 1949–1950 (Italy) Renato Tofani; 1950–1951 (Italy) Enrico Colombari; 1951–1952 (Italy) Ruggero Zanolla (1st–19th) (Italy) Renato Tofani (20th–34th); 1952–1953 (Italy) Giulio Negri; 1953–1954 (Italy) Giacomo Busiello; 1954–1955 (Italy) Secondo Rossi; 1955–1956 (Italy) Raffaele Giraud; 1956–1957 (Italy) Ruggero Zanolla (1st–15th) (Italy) Giuseppe D'Alessandro (16th–34th); 1957–1959 (Italy) Giuseppe D'Alessandro; 1959–1961 (Italy) Gennaro Boerio; 1961–1963 (Italy) Ercole Castaldo; 1963–1964 (Italy) Ercole Castaldo (1st–4th) (Socialist Federal Republic of Yugoslavia) Petar Manola (5th–19th) (Argentina) Bruno Pesaola (20th–30th) (Italy) Jone Spartano and (Uruguay) Giulio Lopez (play-offs); 1964–1965 (Italy) Jone Spartano and (Uruguay) Giulio Lopez; 1965–1966 (Italy) Antonio Giglio and (Italy) Giacomo Blason (1st–34th) (Italy) Jone Spartano and (Uruguay) Giulio Lopez (play-off); 1966–1968 (Italy) Jone Spartano and (Uruguay) Giulio Lopez; 1968–1969 (Italy) Jone Spartano and (Uruguay) Giulio Lopez (1st–7th) (Italy) Pietro Santin (8th–34th); 1969–1970 (Italy) Emilio Zanotti; 1970–1971 (Italy) Emilio Zanotti (1st–23rd) (Italy) Savini and (Italy) Pietro Gonella (23rd–31st) (Italy) Augusto Vaccari (32nd–38th); 1971–1972 (Italy) Ettore Trevisan (1st–10th) (Italy) Feliciano Orazi (11th–19th) (Italy) Tropea (20th–22nd) (Italy) Gennaro Boerio (23rd–38th); 1972–1973 (Italy) Riccardo Carapellese (1st–7th) (Italy) Ruggero Zanolla (8th–9th) (Italy) Jone Spartano (10th–31st) (Italy) Pignataro (32nd–34th); 1973–1974 (France) Henri-Gérard Augustine (1st–14th) (Italy) De Simone and (Italy) Italo Romagnoli (15th–28th) (Italy) Mele and (Italy) Affinito (29th–32nd); 1974–1975 (Italy) Mele and (Italy) Affinito (1st–5th) (Italy) Cappiello (6th–25th) (Italy) Ciccone and (Italy) Affinito (26th–30th); 1975–1976 (Italy) Nicola D'Alessio (1st–3rd) (Italy) Ciro Scognamiglio (4th–6th) (Italy) Vitali (7th–25th) (Italy) Guido Vivarelli (26th–27th) (Italy) Nicola D'Alessio (28th–34th); 1976–1977 (Italy) Primo Ravaglia (1st–9th) (Italy) Nicola D'Alessio (10th–34th); 1977–1978 (Italy) Nicola D'Alessio; 1978–1979 (Italy) Mario Zurlini; 1979–1980 (Italy) Mario Trebbi; 1980–1981 (Italy) Comunardo Niccolai (1st–5th) (Italy) Mario Zurlini (6th–34th); 1981–1982 (Italy) Mario Trebbi (1st–19th) (Italy) Ciro Scognamiglio (20th–34th); 1982–1983 (Italy) Benito Montalto; 1983–1984 (Italy) Celestino Boragine (1st–2nd) (Italy) Michele Gallo (3rd–5th) (Italy) Franco Sgambato (6th–25th) (Italy) Ciro Vesce (26th–30th); 1984–1985 (Italy) Pasquale Lucignano (1st–7th) (Italy) Gaglione (8th–10th) (Italy) Giuseppe Cresci (11th–30th); 1985–1986 (Italy) Dante Portelli (1st–11th) (Italy) Giancarlo Rodolfi (12th–14th) (Italy) Dante Portelli (15th–30th); 1986–1987 (Italy) Antonio Marzocca (1st–11th) (Italy) Aldo Bet (12th–23rd) (Italy) Antonio Marzocca (24th–30th); 1987–1988 (Italy) Antonio Petrone (1st–2nd) (Italy) Ciro Scognamiglio (3rd–7th) (Italy) Giuseppe Cresci (8th–30th); 1988–1989 (Italy) Ciro Vesce (1st–7th) (Italy) Mario Schettino (8th–34th); 1989–1990 (Italy) Mario Schettino; 1990–1991 (Italy) Mario Schettino (1st–29th) (Italy) Mario Zurlini (30th–34th); 1991–1992 (Italy) Sergio Eberini; 1992–1993 (Italy) Sergio Eberini (1st–10th) (Italy) Franco Fabiano (11th–23rd) (Italy) Mario Zurlini (24th–34th and play-out); 1993–1994 (Italy) Mario Zurlini (1st–12th) (Italy) Luigi De Canio (13th–34th); 1994–1995 (Italy) Luigi De Canio; 1995–1996 (Italy) Giovanni Improta (1st–2nd) (Italy) Angelo Orazi (3rd–23rd) (Italy) Giovanni Improta (24th–34th); 1996–1997 (Italy) Francesco D'Arrigo; 1997–1998 (Italy) Francesco D'Arrigo (1st–17th) (Italy) Salvatore Bianchetti (18th–34th); 1998–1999 (Italy) Osvaldo Jaconi; 1999–2000 (Italy) Osvaldo Jaconi (1st–14th) (Italy) Franco Varrella (15th–36th) (Italy) Gaetano Manzi and (Italy) Franco Mango (37th–38th); 2000–2001 (Italy) Massimo Morgia; 2001–2002 (Italy) Giuseppe Monti; 2002–2003 (Italy) Alberto Urban (1st–14th) (Italy) Piero Cucchi (15th–19th) (Italy) Guglielmo Ricciardi (20th–34th); 2003–2004 (Italy) Mario Pietropinto (1st–4th) (Italy) Andrea Chiappini (5th–34th and play-offs); 2004–2005 (Italy) Andrea Chiappini (1st–8th) (Italy) Guglielmo Ricciardi (9th–18th) (Italy) Andrea Chiappini (19th–27th) (Italy) Guglielmo Ricciardi (28th–34th and play-offs); 2005–2006 (Serbia and Montenegro) (Italy) Ranko Lazic (1st–11th) (Italy) Livio Maranzano (12th–17th) (Serbia and Montenegro) (Italy) Ranko Lazic (18th–24th) (Italy) Franco Mango (25th–34th); 2006–2007 (Italy) Paolo Anastasio (1st–26th) (Italy) Paduano (27th) (Italy) Massimo Agovino (28th–34th and play-offs); 2007–2008 (Italy) Massimo Agovino (1st–6th) (Italy) Alberto Aita (7th–8th) (Italy) Capuano (9th) (Italy) Massimo Agovino (10th–18th) (Italy) Sergio La Cava (19th–28th) (Italy) Giuseppe Nunziata (29th–30th) (Italy) Ciro Vesce (31st–34th); 2008–2009 (Italy) Mauro Agovino (1st–28th) (Italy) Domenico Citarelli (29th–36th); 2009–2010 (Italy) Paolo Anastasio; 2010–2012 (Italy) Pasquale Vitter; 2012–2013 (Italy) Pasquale Vitter (1st–6th) (Italy) Salvatore Amura (7th–34th); 2013–2014 (Italy) Vincenzo Feola; 2014–2015 (Italy) Giovanni Bucaro (1st–10th) (Italy) Guido Ugolotti (11th–19th) (Italy) Aldo Papagni (20th–38th); 2015–2016 (Italy) Teore Grimaldi (1st–11th) (Argentina) Roberto Sosa (12th–20th) (Italy) Marco Miserini (21st–30th); 2016–2017 (Italy) Franco Fabiano (1st–19th) (Italy) Michele Cimmino (20th–24th) (Italy) Franco Fabiano (25th–30th); 2017–2018 (Italy) Franco Fabiano; 2018–2019 (Italy) Luigi Squillante (1st–17th) (Italy) Salvatore Campilongo (18th–34th and play-offs); 2019–2020 (Italy) Carmine Parlato; 2020–2021 (Italy) Salvatore Aronica (1st–15th) (Italy) Mauro Chianese (16th–21st) (Italy) Giovanni Ferraro (22nd–34th); 2021–2022 (Italy) Maurizio Lampitelli (1st–2nd) (Italy) Roberto Carannante (3rd–26th); 2022–2023 (Italy) Antonio Barbera (1st–5th) (Italy) Maurizio Lampitelli (6th) (Italy) Antonio Barbera (7th–14th) (Italy) Antonio De Stefano (15th–20th) (Italy) Vincenzo Criscuolo (21st–27th) (Italy) Antonio Barbera (28th–34th); 2023–2024 (Italy) Alfonso Pepe (1st–4th) (Italy) Vincenzo La Manna (5th–24th) (Italy) Salvatore Campilongo (25th–34th); 2024–2025 (Italy) Salvatore Campilongo (1st–11th) (Italy) Carmine Marotta (12th) (ad interim) (Italy) Domenico Giacomarro (13th–15th) (Italy) Franco Fabiano (16th–34th); 2025– (Italy) Raimondo Catalano

Presidents
- 1908–1914 (Italy) Ciro Ilardi; 1915–1918 (Italy) Giusti; 1919–1920 (Italy) Giovanni Guidone; 1920–1921 (Italy) Ciro Ilardi; 1921–1922 (Italy) Giovanni Guarino; 1922–1923 (Italy) Pasquale Fabbrocino; 1923–1925 (Italy) Teodoro Voiello; 1925–1926 vacant; June 1926 (Italy) Giuseppe Balsamo; 1926–1927 (Italy) Teodoro Voiello; 1927–1928 (Italy) Francesco De Nicola (Italy) Pasquale Fabbrocino; 1928–1929 (Italy) Francesco Modugno and (Italy) Giovanni Guidone; 1929–1930 (Italy) Pasquale Fabbrocino; 1930–1931 (Italy) Francesco De Nicola (Italy) Pasquale Fabbrocino and (Italy) Alfredo Gallo; 1931–1933 (Italy) Alfredo Gallo; 1933–1935 (Italy) Achille Filippone; 1935–1936 (Italy) Nello Pagano; 1936–1937 (Italy) Angelo Guidone; 1937–1938 (Italy) Magg. Palmieri and Col. Achille Schiavo; 1938–1943 (Italy) Bruno Salzano; 1944–1945 (Italy) Raffaele Ruggiero; 1945–1946 (Italy) Pietro Imbornone; 1946–1950 (Italy) Antonio Carotenuto; 1950–1951 (Italy) Salvatore Izzo (Italy) Pasquale Monaco; 1951–1952 (Italy) Emilio Ricciardi; 1952–1954 (Italy) Antonio Carotenuto; 1954–1955 (Italy) Antonio Carotenuto and (Italy) Gaetano Bonifacio; 1955–1956 (Italy) Alfonso Genovese; 1956–1961 (Italy) Arcangelo Arpaia; 1961–1964 (Italy) Lello Pagano; 1964–1965 (Italy) Giuseppe Russo; 1965–1966 (Italy) Franco Faraone Mennella; 1966–1967 (Italy) Mario Andreozzi; 1967–1968 (Italy) Giuseppe Decina; 1968–1969 (Italy) Giuseppe Prisco; 1969–1970 (Italy) Giuseppe Russo and (Italy) Gianni Russo; 1970–1971 (Italy) Gianni Russo; 1971–1972 (Italy) Gianni Russo (Italy) Emidio De Pamphilis; 1972–1973 (Italy) Vincenzo Pepe (Italy) Raffaele Mancini (Italy) Francesco Langella (Italy) Pasquale D'Amelio; 1973–1974 (Italy) Pasquale D'Amelio; 1974–1976 (Italy) Gioacchino Coppola; 1976–1982 (Italy) Franco Immobile; 1982–1985 (Italy) Pasquale Gallo; 1985–1986 (Italy) Michele Gallo and (Italy) Giuseppe Sasso; 1986–1987 (Italy) Michele Gallo; 1987–1988 (Italy) Michele Gallo; 1988–1990 (Italy) Pasquale Farinelli; 1990–1991 (Italy) Umberto Farinelli; 1991–1992 (Italy) Pasquale Farinelli; 1992–1993 (Italy) Luigi Farinelli; 1993–1994 (Italy) Gerardo Viglione; 1994–1995 (Italy) Gerardo Viglione (Italy) Franco Salvatore; 1995–2001 (Italy) Mario Moxedano; 2001–2004 (Italy) Dario Pasquariello; 2004–2005 (Italy) Nazario Matachione (Italy) Gaetano Carotenuto; 2005–2006 (Italy) Dario Pasquariello (Italy) Fabrizio Bouchè; 2006–2007 (Italy) Alessandro Farinelli; 2007–2008 (Italy) Luigi Giannatiempo; 2008–2010 (Italy) Vincenzo Angellotti; 2010–2011 (Italy) Giuseppe Caiazzo (Italy) Raffaele Verdezza; 2011–2013 (Italy) Raffaele Verdezza; 2013–2014 (Italy) Lazzaro Luce; 2014–2015 vacant (Italy) Quirico Manca (honorary); 2015–2016 (Italy) Arnaldo Todisco; 2016–2017 (Italy) Ciro Altea and (Italy) Ciro Immobile (honorary); 2017–2018 (Italy) Antonio Nuzzo; 2018–2019 (Italy) Francesco Annunziata and (Italy) Alfonso Mazzamauro (honorary); 2019–2021 (Italy) Elena Annunziata; 2021–2022 (Italy) Mario Pellerone and (Spain) Roberto Esplà Garcìa (honorary); 2022–2023 (Italy) Mario Pellerone (Italy) Gennaro Scognamiglio (Switzerland) (Italy) Emanuele Filiberto of Savoy; 2023–2024 (Italy) Nazario Matachione; 2024–2025 (Italy) Arcangelo Sessa

In over 100 years of history, more than 800 players, mostly Italian, have worn the Savoia jersey.

=== Captains ===
Below is a list of Savoia captains:

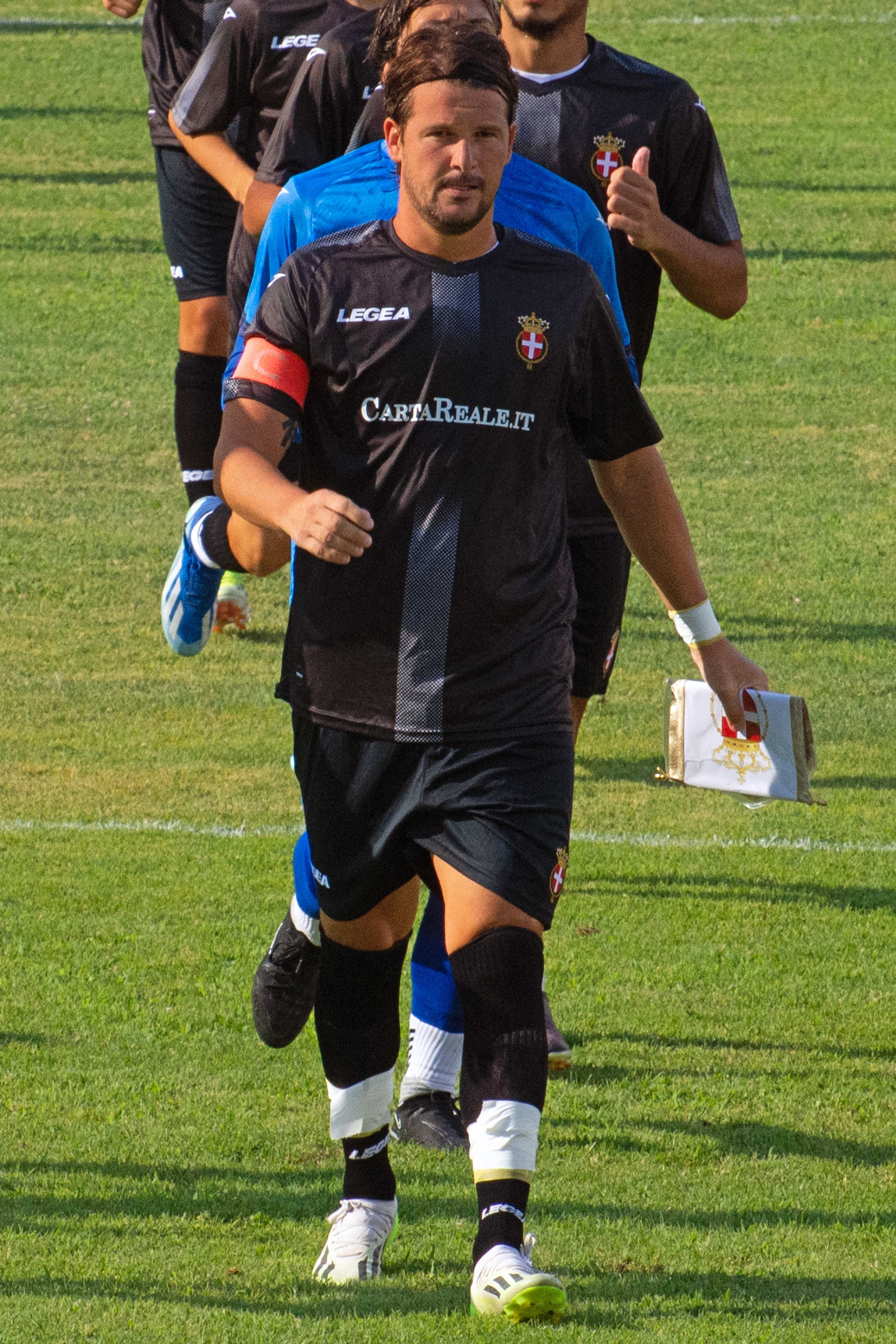
Riccardo Maniero in 2024

- (Italy) Alfredo Fornari (1920–1921)
- (Italy) Giovanni Nebbia (1922–1923)
- (Italy) Raffaele Giraud (1935–1936)
- (Italy) Enrico Colombari (1938–1939)
- (Italy) Gennaro Uliano (1957–1958)
- (Italy) Vincenzo De Luca (1958–1959)
- (Italy) Giovanni Biemmi (1962–1963)
- (Italy) Franco Palumbo (1963–1966)
- (Italy) Enzo Bertossi (1966–1968)
- (Italy) Domenico Busiello (1968–1970)
- (Italy) Pacifico Cuman (1970–1971)
- (Italy) Francesco Scarpa (1971–1972)
- (Italy) Renato Poggiali (1972–1973)
- (Italy) Domenico Busiello (1974–1975)
- (Italy) Raffaele Riso (1975–1976)
- (Italy) Carlo De Amicis (1976 rov–1977)
- (Italy) Fausto Montresor (1977–1978)
- (Italy) Ivan Gregori (1978–1979)
- (Italy) Giuseppe Cafaro (1979–1980)
- (Italy) Giorgio Cantelli (1980–1981)
- (Italy) Giuseppe Cafaro (1981–1982)
- (Italy) Giovanni Bacchiocchi (1982–1983)
- (Italy) Giuseppe Vianello (1983–1984)
- (Italy) Antonio Cinquegrana (1984–1985)
- (Italy) Giorgio Vesce (1985–1986)
- (Italy) Stefano Francioni (1986–1987)
- (Italy) Giuseppe Cimmaruta (1987–1988)
- (Italy) Pellegrino Gaito (1988–1989)
- (Italy) Francesco Esposito (1989–1991)
- (Italy) Massimo Assante (1991–1992)
- (Italy) Salvatore Amura (1992–1993)
- (Italy) Ciro Raimondo (1993–1994)
- (Italy) Salvatore Amura (1994–1995)
- (Italy) Pietro Mariani (1995–1996)
- (Italy) Antonio Marasco (1996–1998)
- (Italy) Aldo Monza (1998–1999)
- (Italy) Stefano Ghirardello (1999–2000)
- (Italy) Diego Pellegrini (2000–2001)
- (Italy) Giovanni Cacace (2001–2002)
- (Italy) Antonio Rogazzo (2002–2003)
- (Italy) Ciro Ferrara (2003–2004)
- (Italy) Pasquale Ottobre (2004–2005)
- (Italy) Alberto Savino (2005)
- (Italy) Antonio Marasco (2006)
- (Italy) Alessandro Malgieri (2006–2007)
- (Italy) Giorgio Scognamiglio (2007–2008)
- (Italy) Francesco Pinto (2008–2009)
- (Italy) Luigi Caravano (2010–2011)
- (Italy) Pasquale Ottobre (2011–2012)
- (Italy) Antonio Guarro (2012–2013)
- (Italy) Francesco Scarpa (2013–2015)
- (Italy) Antonio Guarro (2015–2017)
- (Italy) Dino Fava Passaro (2017–2018)
- (Italy) Crescenzo Liccardo (2018)
- (Italy) Ciro Poziello (2018–2021)
- (Italy) Francesco Scarpa (2021–2023)
- (Italy) Michele Girardi (2023)
- (Italy) Mariano Petricciuolo (2023–2024)
- (Italy) Giacomo Mengoli (2024)
- (Italy) Riccardo Maniero (2024–2025)

=== Contributions to national teams ===
The following players were capped by their respective national teams while playing for Savoia:

- Generoso Rossi for the Italy under-20 team in 1999;
- Giacomo Mazzi for the Italy under-20 team in 1999;
- Daniele De Vezze for the Italy under-20 team in 2000;
- (Democratic Republic of the Congo) Christian Kanyengele for the DR Congo national team in 2000.

== Players ==
=== Current squad ===
As of 30 August 2026

Note: Flags indicate national team as defined under FIFA eligibility rules; some limited exceptions apply. Players may hold more than one non-FIFA nationality.

No.	Pos.	Nation	Player
1	GK	LAT	Klāvs Bethers
4	MF	ITA	Giulio Patrignani (on loan from Cremonese)
6	MF	ITA	Vincenzo Alfieri
7	FW	ITA	Giuseppe D'Agostino
8	MF	ITA	Francesco Meola
9	FW	ITA	Filippo Scotti (on loan from Avellino)
10	FW	ESP	Dani Muñoz
11	MF	ITA	Pasquale Riccardi
12	GK	ITA	Pio Albanese
15	DF	ITA	Alessandro Zoboletti
17	FW	ITA	Matteo Polizzi
18	DF	ITA	Alessandro Martina
20	MF	ITA	Pasquale Pisacane

No.	Pos.	Nation	Player
21	FW	ITA	Andrea Fiasco
22	GK	ITA	Matteo Michele Leonardo (on loan from Spezia Calcio)
24	DF	ITA	Simone Iob
26	DF	ITA	Mario Noce
27	DF	ITA	Francesco Cozzoli
28	MF	ITA	Andrea Gemello
30	DF	ITA	Cristian Fabriani
33	DF	ITA	Fabiano D'Amore
35	DF	ITA	Denis Portanova
45	FW	GHA	Philip Yeboah
77	DF	ITA	Luigi Ferrara
90	FW	ITA	Alessio Nepi
—	FW	ITA	Alessio Di Massimo

== Honours ==
=== Interregional competitions ===
- Central-Southern Italy Championship: 1

1923–24

- Serie D: 5

1964–65, 1969–70, 1989–90, 2013–14, 2025–26

=== Regional competitions ===
- Giordano Cup: 1

1920–21

- Campanian Championship: 5

1922–23, 1923–24, 1924–25, 1929–30, 1974–75

- Terza Divisione: 1

1929–30

- Prima Divisione: 1

1937–38

- Campania Cup: 1

1937–38

- Teodoro Capocci Trophy: 1

1937–38

- Promozione: 3

1953–54, 1974–75, 2010–11

- Prima Categoria: 1

1963–64

- Eccellenza: 3 (record)

2001–02, 2011–12, 2017–18

- Coppa Italia Dilettanti Campania: 2

2011–12, 2017–18

=== Other placements ===
- Promozione

Promotion: 1 (1919–20)

- Central-Southern Italy Championship

Runners-up (1922–23)

- Prima Divisione

Runners-up (1923–24)

- Prima Divisione

Promotion: 1 (1934–35)

- Serie C

Promotion: 1 (1945–46)

- Serie D

Promotion: 1 (1977–78)

- Serie C2

Promotion: 1 (1994–95)

- Serie C1

Promotion: 1 (1998–99)
Third place: 1996–97 (Group B)

=== Youth competitions ===
- Under-19 National Junior Championship: 1

2004–05

=== Awards ===
Silver Star for Sporting Merit (CONI) - ribbon for ordinary uniform

Silver Star for Sporting Merit (CONI)
— 1970

Bronze Star for Sporting Merit (CONI) - ribbon for ordinary uniform

Bronze Star for Sporting Merit (CONI)
— 1980

== Statistics and records ==
=== Team statistics ===
Savoia made their debut in the Italian top flight, then known as Prima Categoria, on 28 November 1920 in the Campania Group A: Savoia–Puteolana 1–1. Their last appearance at that level came on 24 May 1925 in Lazio–Savoia 1–1.

In the top tier, Savoia contested five championships (all before the introduction of the single-group format), earning 95 points from 67 matches, with 41 wins, 13 draws and 13 defeats. They scored 148 goals and conceded 70, giving a points-per-game average of 1.42 – second only to Pro Vercelli in the all-time ranking of the pre-single-group era. Their best finish was second place in the 1923–24 season.

The club has participated in five second-tier championships, achieving one promotion in the pre-single-group era; their best post-Serie B result was sixth place in the 1946–47 season, when they competed under the name Torrese.

They have taken part in 25 third-tier seasons (with four promotions), 22 fourth-tier seasons (five promotions) and 30 fifth-tier seasons (five promotions). The 2024–2025 season was the club's 102nd season.

=== Individual statistics ===
The player with the most appearances in the white-shielded shirt is Giulio Negri with 266 matches; he also holds the record for most seasons played (13). The club’s all-time top league goalscorer is Giulio Bobbio, while Francesco Scarpa holds the overall goalscoring record with 50 goals. The single-season record is held by Salvatore Montaperto, who scored 35 goals in the 2011–12 Eccellenza Campania season.

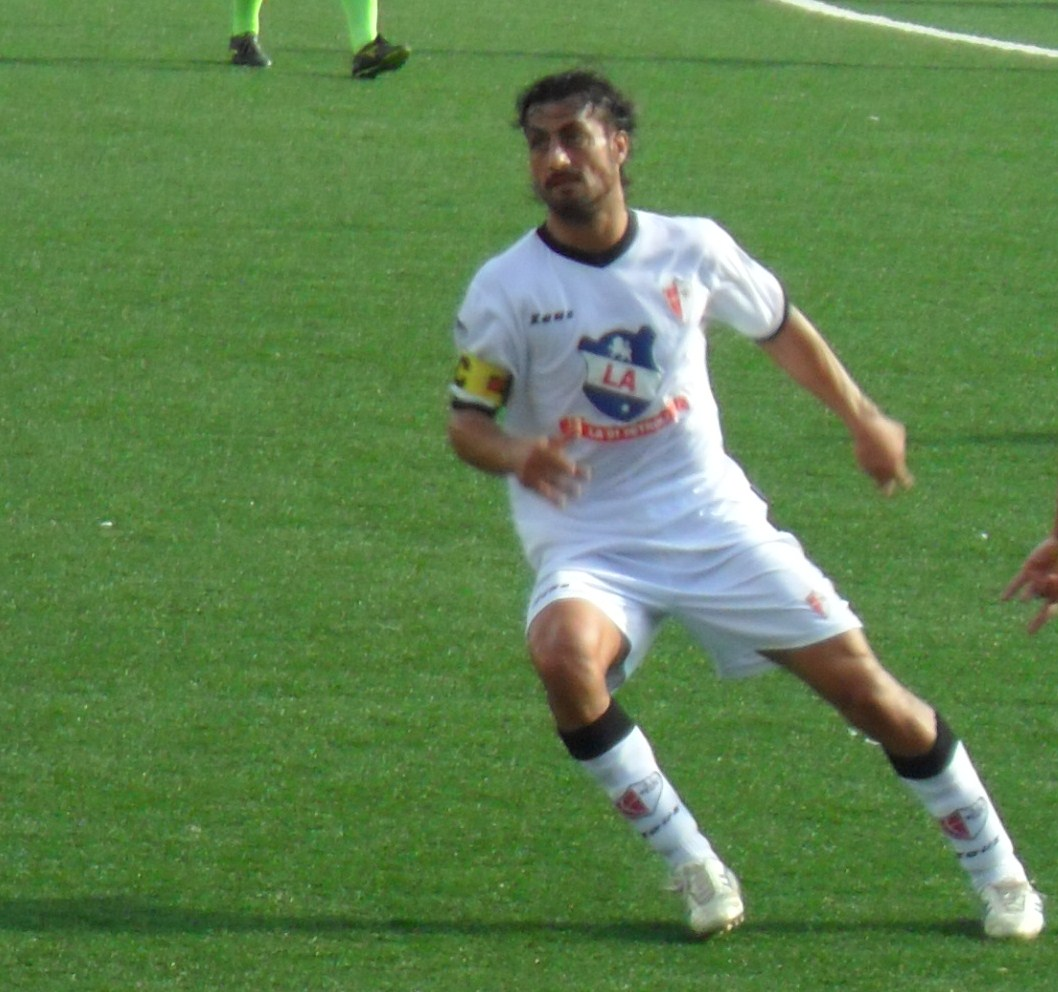
Francesco Scarpa, Savoia’s all-time leading goalscorer

Updated as of the 2024–25 season

Appearance records

- 266 (Italy) Giulio Negri (1939–1948, 1949–1953)
- 200 (Italy) Giacomo Busiello (1938–1943, 1945–1948)
- 197 (Italy) Domenico Busiello (1961–1965, 1968–1970, 1974–1975)
- 192 (Kingdom of Italy) Raffaele Giraud (1926–1927, 1930–1934, 1935–1940, 1941–1942)
- 177 (Italy) Salvatore Amura (1984–1985, 1987–1988, 1991–1993, 1994–1996)
- 164 (Italy) Pietro Palumbo (1956–1963)
- 162 (Italy) Armando Salvatore (1938–1944, 1948–1949, 1951–1953, 1955–1956)
- 161 (Italy) Antonio Marasco (1986–1991, 1996–1997, 1997, 2005–2006)

Goalscoring records

- 50 (Italy) Francesco Scarpa (2013–2015, 2021–2023)
- 47 (Kingdom of Italy) Giulio Bobbio (1921–1925, 1927–1928)
- 45 (Italy) Secondo Rossi (1946–1947, 1949–1950, 1953–1955)
- 43 (Italy) Giovanni Bacchiocchi (1979–1983, 1984–1985)
- 42 (Italy) Salvatore Montaperto (2011–2012)
- 42 (Italy) Vincenzo Caso Naturale (2017–2018, 2020–2021)
- 39 (Italy) Gennaro Esposito (2016–2018)
- 36 (Italy) Giulio Negri (1939–1948, 1949–1953)
- 34 (Kingdom of Italy) Ernesto Ghisi (1922–1925, 1931–1932)
- 34 (Italy) Nino De Caro (1957–1960)

== Supporters ==
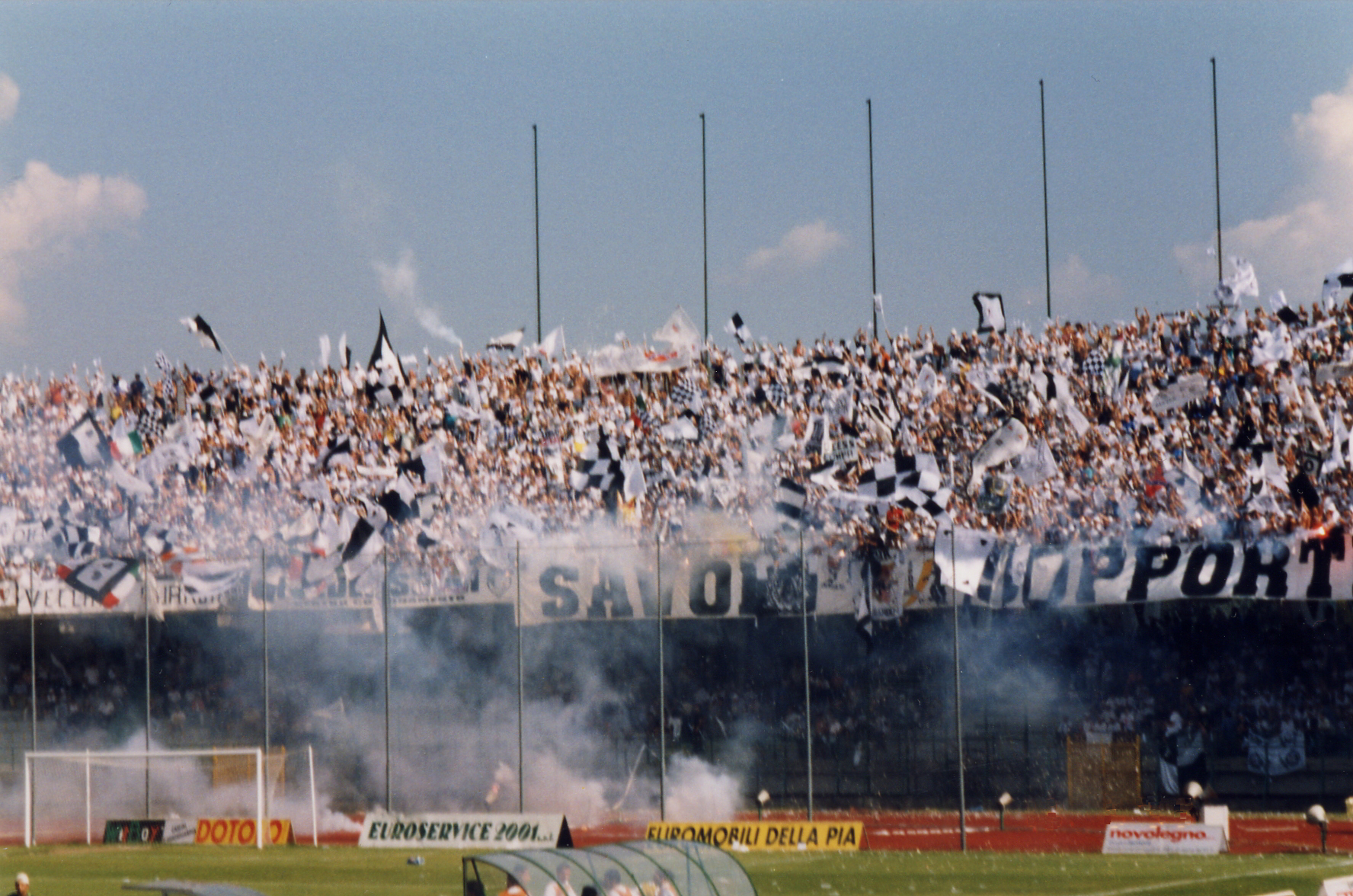
Savoia supporters

=== History ===
Given the relatively small population of its catchment area, the club's supporters are renowned for their consistently impressive attendance numbers. During the 1964 promotion play-offs to Serie D against Boys Caivanese, a crowd of 23,000 was recorded. On 18 January 2012, the Coppa Italia Dilettanti semi-final against Gladiator drew 6,000 spectators – a figure rarely seen at that level of amateur football.

A distinctive tradition among Savoia fans is the chant known as “bianchi alè”, performed for many years at the end of every match, with the team gathering beneath the curva to join the ultras in song.

The Curva Sud houses several ultra groups, including Ultras Oplontini, Vecchi Supporters 1986, Bronx 2004, Rione Carminiello 2004, and UCS (Ultras Cani Sciolti). More recent additions include Black Lions (formed in 2022). Past groups include Gioventù Torrese, Brigate Intifada, Falange Sudista, Morrison Group, Piranhas Group and Savoia Supporters. The very first organised group remains Savoia Club Fedelissimi A. Bellomo, founded in 1975.

=== Twinnings and rivalries ===
Savoia fans are twinned with supporters of Acireale and Ebolitana – the latter dates back to 1985, making it the oldest bond of its kind. Friendly relations exist with the supporters of Paganese (both groups share a rivalry with Nocerina), Sarnese and Catania (established in 2001). In recent years a friendship has also developed with German club Arminia Bielefeld. The twenty-year twinning with Benevento ended in 2016.

The fiercest rivalries are with Turris (due to geographical proximity; clashes reached a peak on 18 January 1998) and Nocerina (during clashes in 1995 gunshots were fired). The animosity with Nocerina is sometimes traced back to the famous brawl between Pompeian and Nocerian gladiators in the Amphitheatre of Pompeii in AD 59.

Strong rivalries also exist with Avellino (intensified since 2000), Portici, Cavese, Siracusa, Ischia and Casertana (where a Savoia player was attacked in 2004). Less intense rivalries exist with Juve Stabia (the twinning partnership, which lasted around 20 years, soured after Savoia began rivaling Stabia’s historical allies, Siracusa), Potenza, Battipagliese, Matera, Foggia, Fidelis Andria, Perugia and Vicenza.

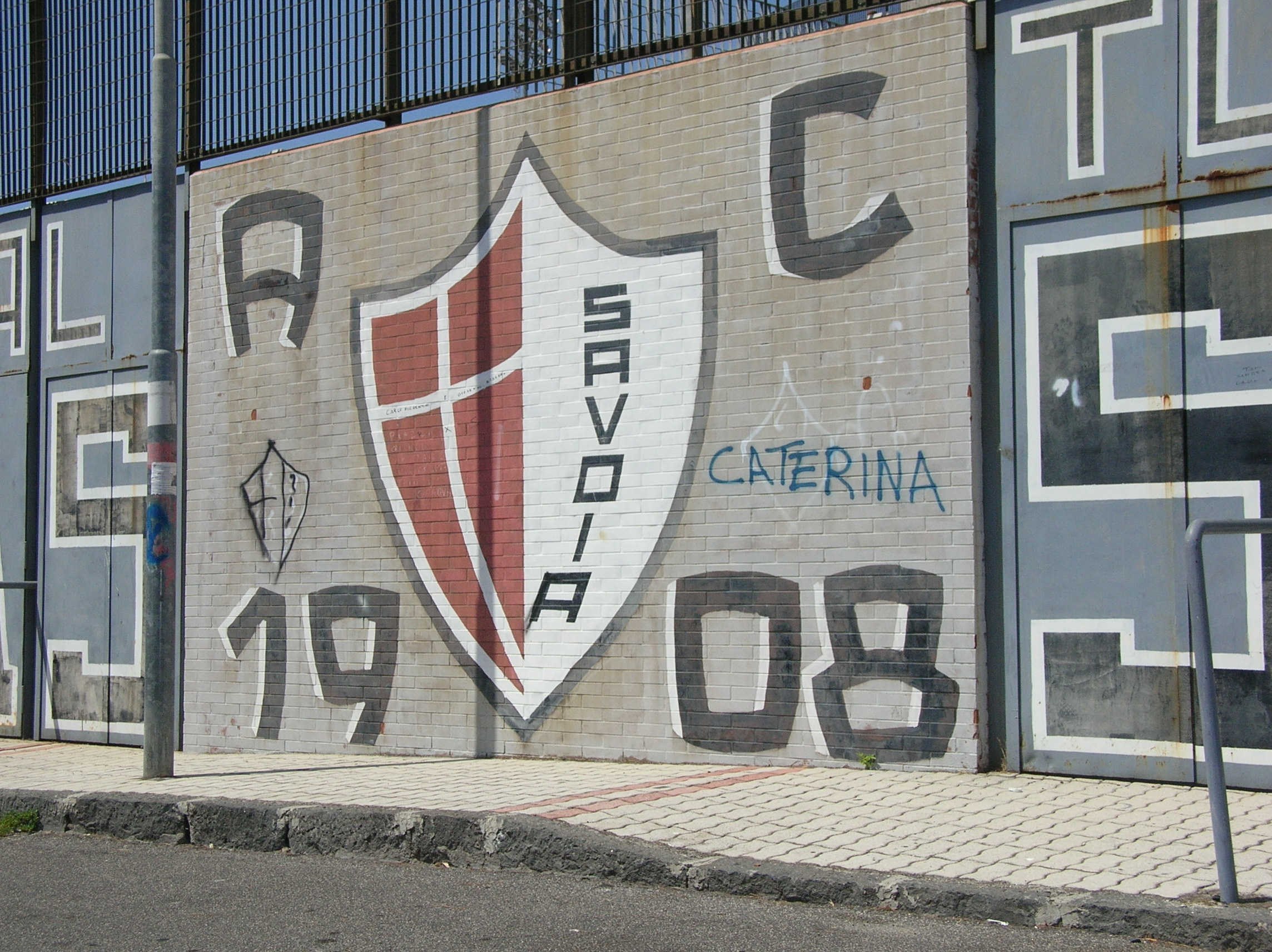
A supporters’ mural

Derbies

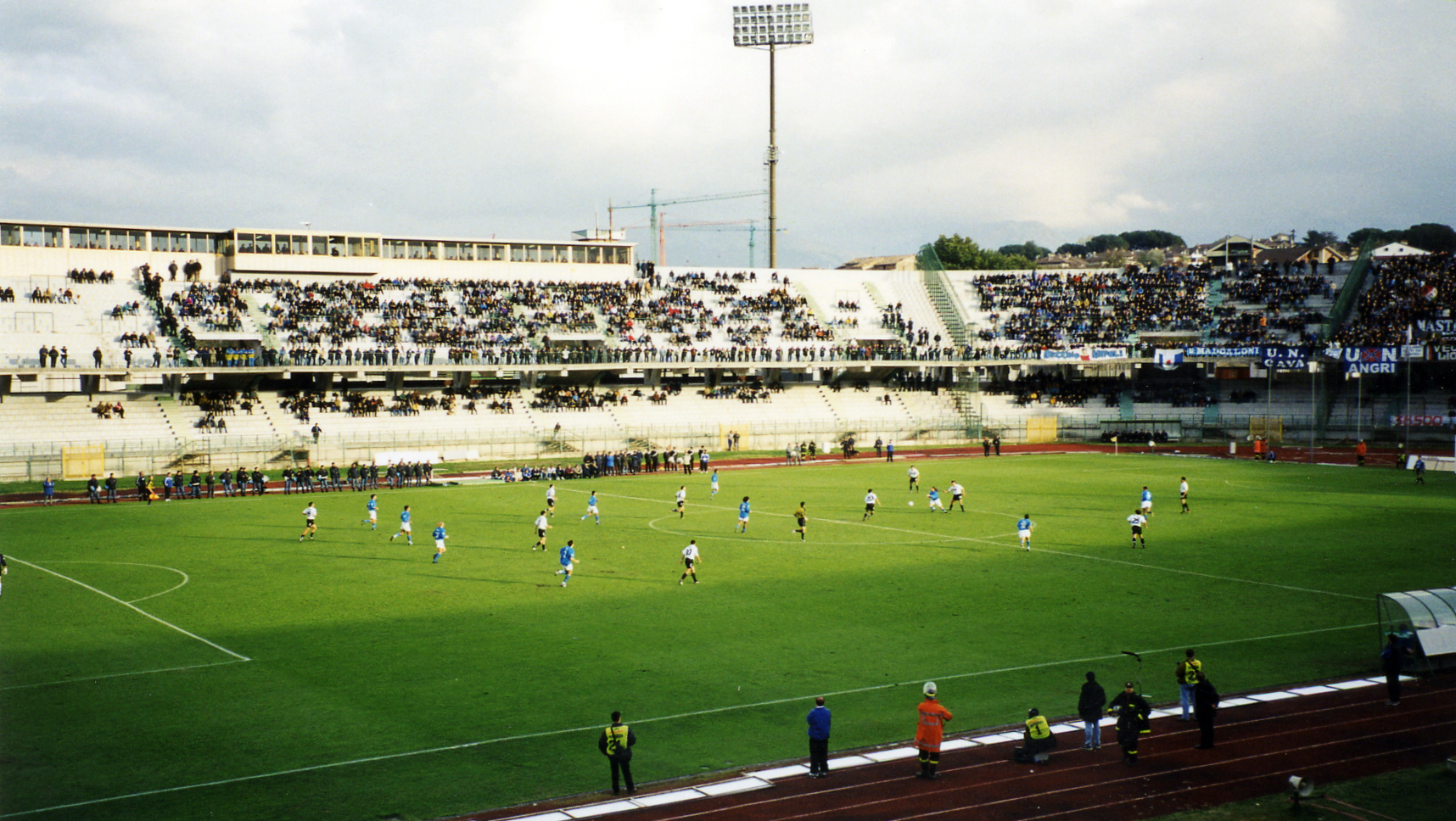
Savoia–Napoli in 1999 at the Stadio Partenio

Four city derbies have been played in Torre Annunziata. In the distant 1919–20 Promozione (the forerunner of today’s Serie B), Savoia twice defeated local rivals Pro Italia 1–0 and 3–0; the latter club was soon absorbed by Savoia itself.

The second and final city derby took place in the 1953–54 Promozione against Rovigliano, ending 0–0 and 4–3 in Savoia’s favour.

Other notable derbies involve historic clubs from the wider Naples metropolitan area and the rest of Campania.

The most contested fixture for Savoia supporters is the so-called derby of the two towers against Turris – a reference to the two neighbouring coastal towns of Torre Annunziata and Torre del Greco. Other highly charged encounters include those with Juve Stabia (from nearby Castellammare di Stabia), Nocerina, Cavese and Avellino, all of which are regularly monitored by the Osservatorio Nazionale sulle Manifestazioni Sportive.

== See also ==
- Torre Annunziata
- Football in Italy

== Bibliography ==
- Ferrone, Eduardo (1979). Il calcio sui maccheroni [Soccer on macaroni]. Torre Annunziata: D'Amelio Editore.
- Calvelli, Chrystian; Lucibelli, Giuseppe; Schettino, Raffaele (2000). Savoia storia e leggenda dall'Oncino al Giraud [Savoia: history and legend from Oncino to Giraud]. Gragnano: Stampa Democratica '95.
- Almanacco illustrato del Calcio 1984 [Illustrated Football Almanac 1984]. Modena: Edizioni Panini s.p.a. 1984.
- Tramontano, Elio (1984). Da Sallustro a Maradona 90 anni di storia del Napoli [From Sallustro to Maradona: 90 years of Napoli history]. Naples: Edizioni Meridionali.
- Archivio Storico La Stampa dal 1867 on line [La Stampa Historical Archive from 1867 online]. Turin: La Stampa S.p.A.
- Barlassina, Rinaldo (1935). L'agendina del calcio 1935-1936 [The 1935-1936 soccer calendar]. Milan: La Gazzetta dello Sport.

== Other projects ==
- Media related to Savoia 1908 at Wikimedia Commons
