= Antonio Marasco =

Italian footballer (born 1970)

Personal information
- Date of birth: 19 February 1970 (age 56)
- Place of birth: Torre Annunziata, Italy
- Height: 1.78 m (5 ft 10 in)
- Position: Midfielder

Youth career
- 1986–1988: Savoia

Senior career*
Years	Team	Apps	(Gls)
1986–1991	Savoia	106	(10)
1991–1996	Avellino	114	(10)
1996–1997	Savoia	42	(2)
1997–1998	Reggiana	31	(0)
1998–2000	Verona	60	(4)
2000–2002	Venezia	67	(2)
2002–2003	Palermo	15	(1)
2003–2004	Modena	45	(0)
2006	Savoia	13	(3)
2006–2007	Scafatese	31	(5)
2007	Neapolis Mugnano	11	(2)
2007–2008	Aversa Normanna		
2008	Pianura		
2008–2009	Aversa Normanna		

Managerial career
- 2014–2015: Savoia (head of youth)
- 2017–2018: Aversa Normanna
- 2020: Gragnano
- 2022: Polisportiva Dil. Lioni
- * Club domestic league appearances and goals

Antonio Marasco (born 19 February 1970) is an Italian former professional footballer. From 2007, he played as a midfielder in Serie D, the fifth highest level in Italian football and the level right below the professional league.

== Career ==
Born in Torre Annunziata, the Province of Naples, Campania, Marasco started his career at hometown club Savoia of Serie D. He won the Group M champions and promoted to Serie C2 in 1990. In 1991, he left for Serie B side Avellino (which also located in Campania) and followed the team relegated in 1992. He followed the team promoted back to Serie B in 1995. In 1996, he returned to Savoia at Serie C1.

In October 1997, he left for Serie B side Reggiana. In October 1998, he left for Serie B side Hellas Verona along with Stefano Guidoni. He won Serie B champion and made his Serie A debut in 1999–2000 season.

In the 2000–01 season, he left for Serie B side Venezia, which won promotion to Serie A in June 2001.

In August 2002, after Venezia's owner Maurizio Zamparini purchased Serie B team Palermo, he followed his teammates Di Napoli, Kewullay Conteh, Mario Santana, Igor Budan, Stefano Morrone and Daniel Andersson, etc. transferred to the Sicily side.

In January 2003, he left for Serie A team Modena.

=== Match-fixing & Serie D ===
He was involved in match-fixing and banned for three years in 2004. Stefano Bettarini, Roberto D'Aversa, Generoso Rossi, Maurizio Caccavale and Alfredo Femiano were also banned.

In January 2006, he returned to football, for non-professional (Serie D) side Savoia. In the 2006–07 season, he left for Scafatese, also from Campania and at Serie D. In the 2006–07 season, he briefly played for Serie C2 side Neapolis Mugnano (which located in Naples, Campania) and then left for another hometown club Aversa Normanna of Serie D.

In the 2008–09 season, he was the captain of Serie D side Pianura, which located in Pianura, suburb of Naples.

== Coaching career ==
In the 2014-15 season, Marasco worked at his former club, Savoia, as responsible for the club's youth academy.

In October 2017 he was appointed head coach of his former club Aversa Normanna, who played in the Italian Serie D. After a poor run of four defeats in six games, Marasco was sacked in April 2018.

On August 25, 2020, Marasco was appointed head coach of Italian Eccellenza club Gragnano. Less than two months later, on October 20, 2020, the club confirmed that Marasco had been fired. During this period, Marasco lost both matches in the Italian Coppa Italia Dilettanti.

In July 2022, Marasco was appointed manager of Eccelenza side Polisportiva Dil. Lioni. He was released from his duties on November 29, 2022.
