= Joe Addo =

Ghanaian footballer (born 1971)

Personal information
- Full name: Joseph Addo
- Date of birth: 21 September 1971 (age 55)
- Place of birth: Accra, Ghana
- Position: Centre back

Youth career
- 1989–1990: Accra Hearts of Oak SC
- 1991–1992: George Mason University

Senior career*
Years	Team	Apps	(Gls)
1993–1996	VfB Stuttgart	–	(–)
1996	Sparta Rotterdam	–	(–)
1997	FSV Frankfurt	7	(0)
1997–1998	Belenenses	–	(–)
1998–1999	Ethnikos Piraeus	21	(0)
1999–2001	Tampa Bay Mutiny	13	(0)
2002–2003	MetroStars	60	(2)
2005–2006	Kitchee	1	(0)

International career
1990–2000	Ghana	23	(1)

Managerial career
- 2008–present: West Essex High School
- * Club domestic league appearances and goals

Joseph ''Joe'' Addo (born 21 September 1971 in Accra) is a former Ghanaian Association football defender and one-time captain of the Ghana national team.

== Club career ==
Addo went to the United States to attend college and play soccer at George Mason University where he was a 1992 First Team All American. On the club level, Addo played for Cagliari in Italy, VfB Stuttgart and FSV Frankfurt in Germany, Sparta Rotterdam in the Netherlands, Belenenses in Portugal, Ethnikos Piraeus in Greece, Tampa Bay Mutiny, MetroStars in the United States and Kitchee in Hong Kong.

Joseph Addo features in the book The Miracle of Castel di Sangro by Joe McGinniss where it seems a transfer for Joseph from FSV Frankfurt to A.S.D. Castel di Sangro Calcio had been agreed, only for the Castel di Sangro's owners to pull out. Joe McGinniss' account asserts that he, the club owners and members of the Castel di Sangro playing staff were unhappy about this, and that the collapse of the transfer was entirely because coach Osvaldo Jaconi did not want Addo in his squad.

== International career ==
Addo played for Ghana at the 1996 Summer Olympics. For the senior team, he appeared 44 times, scoring two goals.

== Personal life ==
Joe is married to Cynthia Addo and has two children.
