= Porchia =

Porchia is a surname. Notable people with the surname include:

- Antonio Porchia (1885–1968), Argentine poet
- Sandro Porchia (born 1977), Italian footballer
