= Ettore Trevisan =

Italian football manager (1929–2020)

Personal information
- Date of birth: 23 March 1929
- Place of birth: Trieste, Italy
- Date of death: 12 November 2020 (aged 91)
- Place of death: Trieste, Italy

Managerial career
- Years: Team
- 1958–1959: Belluno
- 1959–1960: Ethnikos (Piraeus)
- 1960–1962: Niki Volos
- 1962: Aris (Thessaloniki)
- 1963–1964: Olympiacos Volos
- 1965–1967: Pordenone
- 1967–1968: Mestre
- 1968–1969: Potenza
- 1969–1970: Noto
- 1970–1971: Torres
- 1971: Savoia
- 1973–1974: Haiti
- 1974: Olympiacos Volos
- 1974–1975: Pordenone
- 1976–1977: Vigor Senigallia
- 1979–1980: Marsala
- 1985: Marsala

Ettore Trevisan (23 March 1929 – 12 November 2020) was an Italian football manager.

== Career ==
Trevisan started his managerial career with Italian fourth tier side Belluno. At age 31, he was appointed manager of Ethnikos (Piraeus) in the Greek top flight. In 1963, Trevisan was appointed manager of Greek second tier club Olympiacos Volos after receiving an offer from Beşiktaş in the Turkish top flight. In 1965, he was appointed manager of Pordenone in the Italian fourth tier. In 1968, he was appointed manager of Italian third tier team Potenza.

In 1973, Trevisan was appointed manager of Haiti through an agreement between the Haitian and Italian governments, helping them win the 1973 CONCACAF Championship and qualify for the 1974 FIFA World Cup, their only World Cup qualification. In 1974, he returned to Olympiacos Volos in the Greek top flight. In 1967, he was appointed manager of Italian fourth tier outfit Vigor Senigallia. In 1985, Trevisan was appointed manager of Marsala in the Italian sixth tier.
