= Christian Kanyengele =

Congolese footballer

Personal information
- Full name: Kampany Wa Kanyengele
- Date of birth: November 15, 1976 (age 49)
- Place of birth: Kisangani, Zaire
- Height: 1.76 m (5 ft 9 1/2 in)
- Position: Forward

Senior career*
Years	Team	Apps	(Gls)
1996–1999	Terracina	90	(33)
1999–2001	Savoia	46	(14)
2001–2005	Catania	32	(2)
2002–2003	→ Sambenedettese (loan)	16	(2)
2004	→ Sambenedettese (loan)	4	(0)
2005	Sangiovannese	12	(2)
2006–2007	Pro Sangiuseppese	7	(2)
2015–2016	Vercurago Calcio		
Total		207	(55)

International career
1999–2000	Congo DR		
- * Club domestic league appearances and goals

Christian Kanyengele (born 15 November 1976) is a former Congolese football player.

== Career ==
Born in Kisangani, Zaire, Kanyengele spent his youth in the capital Kinshasa and played football for a local amateur side. His club participated in a friendly tournament in Vicenza, Italy, and shortly after he returned to Italy to look for a club at age 18. After working odd jobs for six months, he was eventually signed by Serie D club A.S. Terracina.

Kanyengele spent three seasons with Terracina, but due to restrictions on clubs signing foreign players in Serie C, he had a difficult time finding a new club.

In 1999, Kanyengele joined Serie B side Calcio Savoia, playing two seasons with the club. He moved on to Calcio Catania in Serie C1, eventually appearing for the club in Serie B and going on loan to S.S. Sambenedettese Calcio twice.

Kanyengele made several appearances for the senior Congo DR national football team, including appearing in the 2000 African Nations Cup qualifying rounds. He scored two goals in a home Nations Cup qualifier against Kenya in January 1999.
