= Enrico Colombari =

Italian footballer and coach (1905-1983)

Personal information
- Date of birth: 31 January 1905
- Place of birth: La Spezia, Kingdom of Italy
- Date of death: 8 March 1983 (aged 78)
- Height: 1.70 m (5 ft 7 in)
- Position: Midfielder

Senior career*
Years	Team	Apps	(Gls)
1919–1920	Gerbi Pisa	1	(0)
1920–1926	Pisa	134	(10)
1926–1930	Torino	101	(4)
1930–1937	Napoli	213	(6)
1937–1938	Pisa	21	(1)
1938–1939	Savoia	10	(0)

International career
1928–1933	Italy	9	(0)

Managerial career
- 1938–1939: Savoia
- 1939–1940: Empoli
- 1940–1941: Savoia
- 1941–1942: Ternana
- 1942–1943: Vittorio Veneto
- 1946–1947: Pro Mogliano
- 1947–1948: Treviso
- 1950–1951: Torrese
Medal record
Italy
Central European International Cup
Gold medal – first place	1927–30 Central European International Cup
Central European International Cup
Silver medal – second place	1931-32 Central European International Cup
- * Club domestic league appearances and goals

Enrico Colombari (Italian pronunciation: [enˈriːko kolomˈbaːri]; 31 January 1905 – 8 March 1983) was an Italian professional football player and coach who played as a midfielder.

== Club career ==
Colombari won the Italian championship with A.C. Torino in 1927–28.

He played for 8 seasons (242 games, 10 goals) in the Serie A for Torino and S.S.C. Napoli.

== International career ==
Colombari made his debut for the Italy national football team on 14 October 1928 in a game against Switzerland. He made 2 starts in the gold winning 1927–30 Central European International Cup campaign & 1 in the silver winning 1931–32 Central European International Cup campaign.

== International ==
Italy

- Central European International Cup: 1927–30; Runner-up: 1931–32
