= Eupremio Carruezzo =

Italian footballer (born 1969)

Personal information
- Full name: Eupremio Carruezzo
- Date of birth: December 9, 1969 (age 56)
- Place of birth: Brindisi, Italy
- Height: 1.80 m (5 ft 11 in)
- Position: Forward

Senior career*
Years	Team	Apps	(Gls)
1986–88	Brindisi	33	(0)
1988–89	Barletta	17	(2)
1989–90	Brindisi	0	(0)
1989–91	Salernitana	46	(8)
1991–92	Ancona	21	(2)
1992–93	Monza	15	(1)
1993–94	Ancona	1	(0)
1993–94	Venezia	15	(5)
1994–95	Barletta	30	(9)
1995–97	Savoia	65	(27)
1997–98	Reggiana	5	(1)
1997–99	Cagliari	31	(3)
1999–00	Livorno	30	(12)
2000–01	Como	19	(8)
2001–07	Lucchese	172	(64)
2007–08	San Marino Calcio	29	(7)
- * Club domestic league appearances and goals

Eupremio Carruezzo (born 9 December 1969) is a retired Italian footballer who played as a forward. He is deemed one of the best Italian players who has played in the lower divisions. He was born in Brindisi and always showed love and attachment for his homeland, although he played everywhere in Italy. In 2001, before joined Lucchese, rumours linked Eupremio Carruezzo to English Premier League team Manchester United, as Sir Alex Ferguson sent his assistants everywhere in Europe. Due to family reasons Eupremio was forced to reject United's bid, and alleged it as the worst regret in his career as footballer and in his whole life.

== See also ==
- Football in Italy
- List of football clubs in Italy
