= Alessio Di Massimo =

Italian footballer (born 1996)

Personal information
- Date of birth: 7 May 1996 (age 30)
- Place of birth: Sant'Omero, Italy
- Height: 1.80 m (5 ft 11 in)
- Position: Winger

Team information
- Current team: Savoia
- Number: 10

Youth career
- –2016: Sant'omero Palmense
- 2015–2016: → Juventus (loan)

Senior career*
Years	Team	Apps	(Gls)
2014–2016	Sant'omero Palmense	30	(17)
2014–2015	→ Alba Adriatica (loan)	32	(14)
2015	→ Avezzano (loan)	12	(5)
2016	Pescara	0	(0)
2017–2020	Sambenedettese	112	(14)
2020–2022	Triestina	8	(0)
2020–2021	→ Catanzaro (loan)	34	(8)
2022	Pistoiese	14	(2)
2022–2023	Ancona	18	(7)
2023–2026	Gubbio	56	(15)
2026–	Savoia	0	(0)
- * Club domestic league appearances and goals as of 30 April 2026

Alessio Di Massimo (born 7 May 1996) is an Italian professional footballer who plays as a winger for Serie C Group C club Savoia.

== Club career ==
Born in Sant'Omero, Di Massimo started his career in local club Sant'omero Palmense on Promozione. He played on loan for Eccellenza Alba Adriatica and Serie D club Avezzano, after joined to Juventus Primavera in 2016.

He left the club in 2016, and joined Pescara.

On 26 July 2016, he moved to Sambenedettese. Di Massimo spent four seasons at the club, and played 112 Serie C matches for Sambenedettese.

On 15 August 2020, he signed with Triestina.

On 5 October 2020, he was loaned to Catanzaro.

On 31 January 2022, Di Massimo signed a contract with Pistoiese until 2024.

On 12 July 2022, Di Massimo joined Ancona on a two-year contract.
