= 1927–28 Prima Divisione =

Italian football league season

Prima Divisione
- Season: 1927–28
- Dates: 25 September 1927 – 17 June 1928
- Champions: Atalanta (1st title)
- Promoted: Atalanta; Biellese; Pistoiese; Bari and six other guests
- Relegated: all the remaining Southern clubs

The 1927–28 Prima Divisione was the 2nd edition of a second tier tournament of the Italian Football Championship which was organized at national level.

== Team selection ==
1927–28 Prima Divisione teams location map.
Group B; Group A; Group C; Group D.

The format of the championship was confirmed, but AS Roma and SSC Napoli received a wild card to join the National Division as guests, so the Southern group remained solely with eight clubs.

Following merging of new clubs in Rome and Genoa, both Udinese and Anconitana were re-elected in the league.

AC Monza, Ponziana, Carrarese and Ternana were promoted from the inter-regional leagues.

Following various clubs merging and financial bankruptcies for a till weak Southern football, Valenzana and Lecco Calcio from the North, and Tivoli and US Savoia from the South were invited to join the league.

== Rules ==
The promotion of the group winners was confirmed.

Relegation zone was theoretically expanded to two clubs for each group, but the Great Reform of the Italian football of 1928–29 changed the situation.

== Group A ==
	Prima Divisione group A 1927–28	Pt	G	V	N	P	GF	GS
1.	Atalanta	30	18	13	4	1	41	10
2.	Venezia	24	18	10	4	4	31	24
3.	Fiumana	22	18	9	4	5	48	28
4.	Triestina	21	18	8	5	5	33	30
5.	Ponziana	20	18	8	4	6	43	36
6.	Udinese	19	18	8	3	7	36	34
7.	Treviso	19	18	8	3	7	29	30
8.	SPAL	15	18	6	3	9	35	40
9.	Ancona	5	18	1	3	14	15	49
10.	Monfalconese	5	18	2	1	15	14	44

- Atalanta promoted to Divisione Nazionale 1928–29.
- Venezia, Fiumana and Triestina later invited to Divisione Nazionale by the FIGC as guests.
- Ancona and Monfalconese later re-elected following the Great Reform of the Italian football.

== Group B ==
	Prima Divisione group B 1927–28	Pt	G	V	N	P	GF	GS
1.	Biellese	24	18	.	.	.	.	.
2.	Legnano	22	18	.	.	.	.	.
3.	US Milanese	22	18	.	.	.	.	.
4.	Parma	21	18	.	.	.	.	.
5.	Comense	20	18	.	.	.	.	.
6.	Monza	18	18	.	.	.	.	.
7.	Mantova	17	18	.	.	.	.	.
8.	Valenzana	13	18	.	.	.	.	.
9.	Derthona	12	18	.	.	.	.	.
10.	Astigiani	11	18	.	.	.	.	.

- Biellese promoted to Divisione Nazionale 1928–29.
- Legnano later invited to Divisione Nazionale by the FIGC as guests.
- U.S. Milanese merged by the fascist FIGC into Inter to create new Società Sportiva Ambrosiana.
- Derthona and Astigiani later re-elected following the Great Reform of the Italian football.

== Group C ==
	Prima Divisione group C 1927–28	Pt	G	V	N	P	GF	GS
1.	Pistoiese	27	18	12	3	3	41	12
2.	Prato	24	18	9	6	3	38	21
3.	Spezia	23	18	10	3	4	29	14
4.	Savona	21	18	8	5	5	33	21
5.	Sestrese	17	18	8	1	7	24	20
6.	Carpi	17	18	7	3	9	25	41
7.	Carrarese	15	18	4	7	6	23	22
8.	Pisa	15	18	4	7	7	13	30
9.	Lecco	14	18	5	4	8	23	30
10.	Lucchese	7	18	2	3	15	16	53

- Pistoiese promoted to Divisione Nazionale 1928–29.
- Prato later invited to Divisione Nazionale by the FIGC as guests.
- Lecco and Lucchese later re-elected following the Great Reform of the Italian football.

== Group D ==
	Prima Divisione group D 1927–28	Pt	G	V	N	P	GF	GS
1.	Bari	22	14	10	2	2	32	12
2.	Fiorentina	18	14	7	4	3	31	14
3.	Terni	18	14	7	4	3	28	16
4.	Foggia	16	14	7	2	5	28	20
5.	Taranto	14	14	4	6	4	23	17
6.	Ideale Bari	13	14	5	3	6	12	17
7.	Savoia	3	14	1	4	9	17	33
8.	Tivoli	0	14	0	1	13	4	39

- Bari promoted to Divisione Nazionale 1928–29.
- Fiorentina later invited to Divisione Nazionale by the FIGC as guests.
- Ternana, Foggia, Taranto and Tivoli forcely resigned from the Direttorio Divisioni Superiori for a general financial crash, and joined a special Southern Championship.
- Savoia went bankrupt during the championship and was disbanded.
- Ideale Bari merged with Bari Liberty to create AS Bari.

== Title final group ==
	Championship finals 1928	Pt	G	V	N	P	GF	GS
1.	Atalanta	6	6	.	.	.	..	..
1.	Pistoiese	6	6	.	.	.	..	..
1.	Bari	6	6	.	.	.	..	..
1.	Biellese	6	6	.	.	.	..	..

Tie–breakers:

	Results		Location
Pistoiese	2–0	Bari	Rome, 10 June 1928
Atalanta	2–0 (forf.)	Biellese	Plaisance, 10 June 1928

Final:

	Results		Location
Atalanta	3–0	Pistoiese	a Faenza 17 June 1928

- Atalanta B-champions 1928.

== Championship reform ==
Under orders of fascist Leandro Arpinati, the FIGC President, the Italian football had its greatest reform between 1928 and 1929.

A completely new round robin Serie B was planned for 1929. Arpinati immediately expanded the National Division, which would split in A and B in 1929, with best First Division clubs.

== Sources ==
- Gazzetta dello Sport, season 1927–28
