= 1923–24 Prima Divisione =

23rd season of top-tier Italian football

Prima Divisione
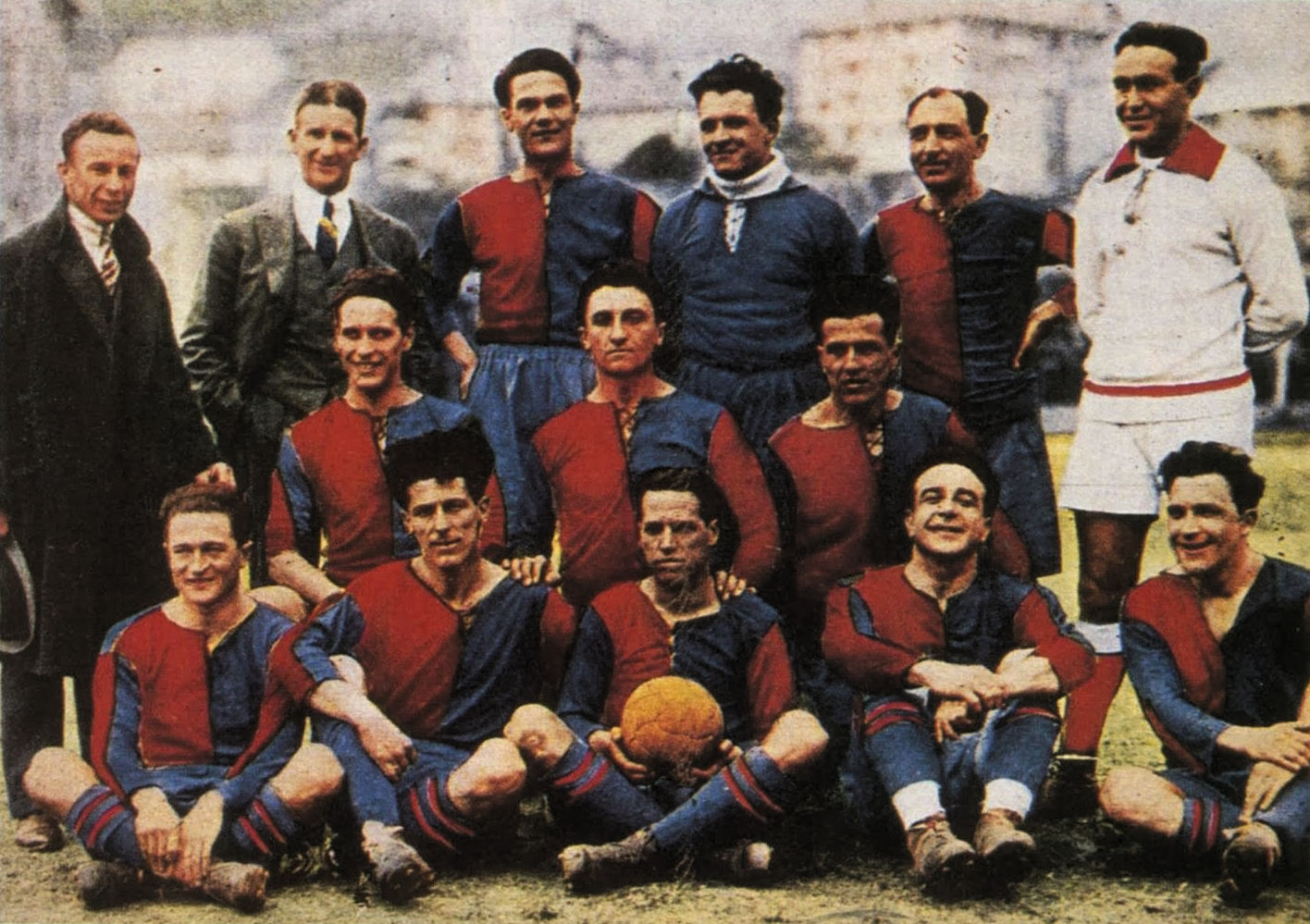
- 1923–24 Genoa team
- Season: 1923–24
- Champions: Genoa; 9th title
- Relegated: Virtus Bologna; Novese
- Top goalscorer: Heinrich Schönfeld (22 goals)

The 1923-24 Prima Divisione was the twenty-fourth edition of the Italian Football Championship and the third branded Prima Divisione. The 1923–24 Prima Divisione was the ninth Italian Football Championship won by Genoa. Genoa's win that season was the first in which the Italian Football Champions celebrated by adorning the team jerseys the following season with a Scudetto.

== Format ==
All five seasons of Prima Divisione were scheduled as regional competitions, leading to a national final.

== Northern League ==
The Northern League was composed by the 24 best clubs of 1922–23 Prima Divisione.

=== Regular season ===
Group winners went to the final. Bottom clubs were relegated, while penultimate clubs went to a test-match against two clubs of the Second Division.

==== Group A ====
===== Classification =====
P	Team	Pld	W	D	L	GF	GA	GD	Pts	Promotion or relegation
1.	Genoa	22	14	5	3	50	13	+37	33	Qualified
2.	Padova	22	12	5	5	36	18	+18	29	
3.	Internazionale	22	11	5	6	31	25	+6	27	
3.	Livorno	22	12	3	7	33	30	+3	27	
5.	Alessandria	22	10	6	6	38	23	+15	26	
5.	Juventus	22	11	4	7	37	27	+10	26	
7.	Modena	22	8	7	7	35	30	+5	23	
8.	Casale	22	10	2	10	25	34	-9	22	
9.	Sampierdarenese	22	9	0	13	21	32	-11	18	
10.	Brescia	22	5	3	14	17	39	-22	13	
11.	Novara	22	4	4	14	22	41	-19	12	Qualification play-off
12.	Virtus Bologna	22	3	2	17	13	46	-33	8	Relegated

===== Results table =====
Home \ Away	ALE	BRE	CAS	GEN	INT	JUV	LIV	MOD	NOV	PAD	SAM	VIR
Alessandria	—	4–0	5–1	1–1	1–1	3–1	0–1	5–0	0–0	2–2	3–0	4–0
Brescia	0–0	—	3–0	0–1	1–1	0–2	1–0	1–1	2–1	0–1	0–2	0–1
Casale	0–1	4–1	—	0–0	1–0	2–3	2–0	1–0	1–0	1–0	1–0	4–0
Genoa	2–0	5–0	6–1	—	5–1	1–1	2–0	4–1	4–0	1–2	4–0	5–0
Internazionale	1–0	3–0	3–0	0–2	—	2–2	4–0	1–1	2–1	2–1	1–0	2–0
Juventus	3–1	0–1	3–2	0–2	2–0	—	1–1	0–2	2–0	3–0	4–1	1–0
Livorno	2–1	3–2	0–0	3–1	3–0	3–2	—	3–1	3–1	1–1	2–0	4–1
Modena	5–1	2–0	2–0	0–0	1–2	1–1	3–0	—	7–2	0–0	2–1	2–1
Novara	1–2	2–1	2–3	1–2	1–1	1–0	3–0	2–2	—	0–0	0–2	2–1
Padova	1–1	4–2	3–0	0–1	1–2	2–0	2–0	3–1	3–1	—	5–0	3–0
Sampierdarenese	1–2	1–0	2–0	1–0	2–1	2–3	0–1	1–0	1–0	0–1	—	4–0
Virtus Bologna	0–1	1–2	0–1	1–1	0–1	0–3	2–3	1–1	2–1	0–1	2–0	—

Legend: Blue = home team win; Yellow = draw; Red = away team win.

==== Group B ====
===== Classification =====
P	Team	Pld	W	D	L	GF	GA	GD	Pts	Promotion or relegation
1.	Bologna	22	13	5	4	41	18	+23	31	Qualified
2.	Torino	22	12	6	4	43	22	+21	30	
3.	Pro Vercelli	22	11	6	5	46	23	+23	28	
4.	Hellas Verona	22	8	7	7	43	35	+8	23	
5.	Pisa	22	7	8	7	26	35	-9	22	
6.	Andrea Doria	22	7	7	8	28	26	+2	21	
6.	Legnano	22	8	5	9	27	26	+1	21	
8.	Cremonese	22	8	4	10	24	31	-7	20	
9.	Milan	22	7	5	10	38	44	-6	19	
10.	SPAL	22	6	6	10	26	44	-18	18	
11.	Spezia	22	7	3	12	16	35	-19	17	Qualification play-off
12.	Novese	22	5	4	13	21	40	-19	14	Relegated

===== Results table =====
Home \ Away	ADO	BOL	CRE	HEL	LEG	MIL	NOV	PIS	PRO	SPA	SPE	TOR
Andrea Doria	—	0–1	4–0	4–2	4–0	1–1	0–2	1–1	1–1	0–1	1–0	2–1
Bologna	3–0	—	2–0	3–1	3–2	4–0	2–0	5–0	3–3	2–1	5–0	0–1
Cremonese	2–0	0–0	—	1–1	0–1	4–1	2–1	2–0	2–1	1–1	3–1	0–0
Hellas Verona	2–2	2–2	2–0	—	3–1	5–1	5–2	2–1	1–0	8–1	2–2	1–2
Legnano	0–2	1–1	1–2	1–0	—	2–2	1–0	3–0	1–0	4–0	2–0	3–1
Milan	1–2	1–0	0–1	2–1	2–1	—	5–0	5–1	1–3	3–4	3–1	0–3
Novese	1–0	0–1	2–0	3–0	1–1	1–2	—	2–2	1–1	2–1	0–1	1–4
Pisa	2–2	2–1	2–1	1–1	1–1	2–2	1–0	—	1–0	2–1	2–0	1–1
Pro Vercelli	2–2	0–1	4–1	3–0	1–0	2–1	3–1	4–1	—	6–0	4–0	0–0
SPAL	1–1	0–1	2–1	1–1	1–1	1–1	2–0	1–0	4–4	—	0–1	0–2
Spezia	1–0	0–0	1–0	1–2	1–0	2–1	1–1	1–4	0–2	0–1	—	1–0
Torino	3–1	4–1	4–1	1–1	1–0	3–3	5–0	1–1	1–2	3–1	2–1	—

Legend: Blue = home team win; Yellow = draw; Red = away team win.

=== Finals ===
The finals were played after a May break due to the participation of the Italian football team to the Olympics in Paris.

Team 1	Agg.	Team 2	1st leg	2nd leg
Genoa	3-0	Bologna	1-0	2-0

=== Qualification play-off ===
==== Classification ====
P	Team	Pld	W	D	L	GF	GA	GD	Pts	Promotion or relegation
1.	Spezia	6	4	2	0	10	3	+7	10	Qualified
2.	Novara	6	3	2	1	14	3	+11	8	Qualified
3.	Olimpia Fiume	6	2	1	3	7	11	-4	5	
4.	Sestrese	6	0	1	5	4	18	-14	1	

==== Results table ====
Home \ Away	NOV	OLI	SES	SPE
Novara	—	3–1	6–0	1–1
Olimpia Fiume	1–0	—	1–0	1–3
Sestrese	0–4	3–3	—	1–2
Spezia	0–0	2–0	2–0	—

Legend: Blue = home team win; Yellow = draw; Red = away team win.

== Southern League ==
The Southern League was a separate amatorial league, still divided in five regions. The winner were Savoia from Torre Annunziata.

== National Finals ==
- 1st Leg: 31 Aug 1924, *2nd Leg: 7 Sep 1924

Team 1	Agg.	Team 2	1st leg	2nd leg
Genoa	4-2	Savoia	3-1	1-1

== Top goalscorers ==
Rank	Player	Club	Goals
1	(Austria) Heinrich Schönfeld	Torino	22
2	(Italy) Fulvio Bernardini	Lazio	17
3	(Italy) Giulio Bobbio	Savoia	16
4	(Italy) Adolfo Baloncieri	Alessandria	15
4	(Italy) Angelo Schiavio	Bologna	15
6	(Italy) Aristodemo Santamaria	Genoa	14

== References and sources ==
- Almanacco Illustrato del Calcio - La Storia 1898-2004, Panini Edizioni, Modena, September 2005
