= Alessio Nepi =

Italian footballer (born 2000)

Personal information
- Date of birth: 25 January 2000 (age 26)
- Place of birth: Ancona, Italy
- Height: 1.90 m (6 ft 3 in)
- Position: Forward

Team information
- Current team: Savoia
- Number: 90

Youth career
- –2018: Ascoli
- 2018–2019: Fermana

Senior career*
| Years | Team | Apps | (Gls) |
| 2019–2022 | Fermana | 16 | (4) |
| 2019 | → Montegiorgio (loan) | 11 | (4) |
| 2020 | → Jesina (loan) | 9 | (3) |
| 2020–2021 | → Fano (loan) | 27 | (3) |
| 2022–2024 | Pro Vercelli | 38 | (6) |
| 2022 | → Lecco (loan) | 16 | (2) |
| 2022–2023 | → Alessandria (loan) | 17 | (2) |
| 2023 | → Renate (loan) | 15 | (1) |
| 2024–2025 | Arzignano | 20 | (2) |
| 2025–2026 | Giugliano | 33 | (11) |
| 2026 | Perugia | 12 | (2) |
| 2026– | Savoia | 2 | (0) |
- * Club domestic league appearances and goals as of 29 August 2026

Alessio Nepi (born 25 January 2000) is an Italian professional footballer who plays as a forward for Serie C Group C club Savoia.

== Club career ==
Formed in Ascoli youth system, Nepi joined Fermana in 2018. He made his professional debut in Serie C on 7 October 2018 against Ravenna.

On 10 August 2020, he extended his contract with the club.

On 5 October 2020, he was loaned to Fano.

On 31 January 2022, Nepi signed a contract until 30 June 2026 with Pro Vercelli and was loaned to Lecco. On 25 August 2022, Nepi moved on loan to Alessandria. On 3 January 2023, he returned to Pro Vercelli and was loaned out to Renate.

On 24 July 2024, Nepi signed a two-year contract with Arzignano.
