= Mario Noce =

Italian footballer (born 1999)

Personal information
- Date of birth: 20 October 1999 (age 27)
- Place of birth: Catania, Italy
- Height: 1.89 m (6 ft 2 in)
- Position: Defender

Team information
- Current team: Savoia
- Number: 26

Youth career
- 2003–2004: Polisportiva Catania 1980
- 2004–2007: San Pio
- 2010–2019: Catania

Senior career*
Years	Team	Apps	(Gls)
2017–2021	Catania	9	(0)
2017	→ Chieti (loan)	5	(0)
2018	→ Gozzano (loan)	1	(0)
2018–2019	→ Cesena (loan)	31	(0)
2021	→ Potenza (loan)	4	(0)
2021–2022	Ancona-Matelica	20	(0)
2022–2025	Legnago	86	(4)
2025–2026	Livorno	32	(2)
2026–	Savoia	2	(0)
- * Club domestic league appearances and goals as of 29 August 2026

Mario Noce (born 20 October 1999) is an Italian professional footballer who plays as defender for Serie C Group C club Savoia.

== Club career ==
=== Early career ===
At the age of four he joined the children's team Polispostiva Catania 1980. Later he joined San Pio, where he played for three years. In 2010, he joined the youth sector of Catania.

=== Chieri ===
On 1 August 2017 he was loaned to Chieti.

=== Gozzano ===
In winter 2018 he was loaned to Gozzano. He helped the team to win group A of the 2017–18 Serie D. He made 2 appearances.

=== Catania ===
He made his debut in the first team on 5 August 2018, in the second round of the Coppa Italia against Foggia in the away match. They won 1–3.

=== Cesena ===
Shortly after his professional debut he returned to play in Serie D for Cesena. He made his debut with Cesena on 14 October 2018, in the 2–0 victory against Virtus Francavilla. On 28 October 2018 he scored his first goal for the team in a 0–2 away victory against Jesina. At the end of the championship they won group F of the 2018–19 Serie D. He made 31 appearances and one goal for Cesena.

=== Return to Catania ===
In 2019 he signed a two-year professional contract for Catania. Despite this, he only managed to make 3 appearances with 0 goals in the 2019–20 season. His return to Catania began on 22 October 2019 in the 4–2 defeat against Avellino.

In the 2020–21 season he made 6 appearances and 0 goals, before moving to Potenza.

=== Potenza ===
On 1 February 2021 he was loaned to Potenza. He made in that season only four appearances.

=== Ancona-Matelica ===
On 31 August 2021 he signed with Ancona-Matelica.

=== Legnago ===
On 24 August 2022, Noce moved to Legnago in Serie D.

== Style of play ==
He is a very fast right back, and can also play as a central defender.

== Personal life ==
Noce was born in Catania on 20 October 1999.

His father died on 3 April 2019 at the age of 54 due to a traffic collision with his Vespa.

== Honours ==
Gozzano

Serie D: 2017–18

Cesena

Serie D: 2018–19
