= Francesco Scarpa =

Italian footballer

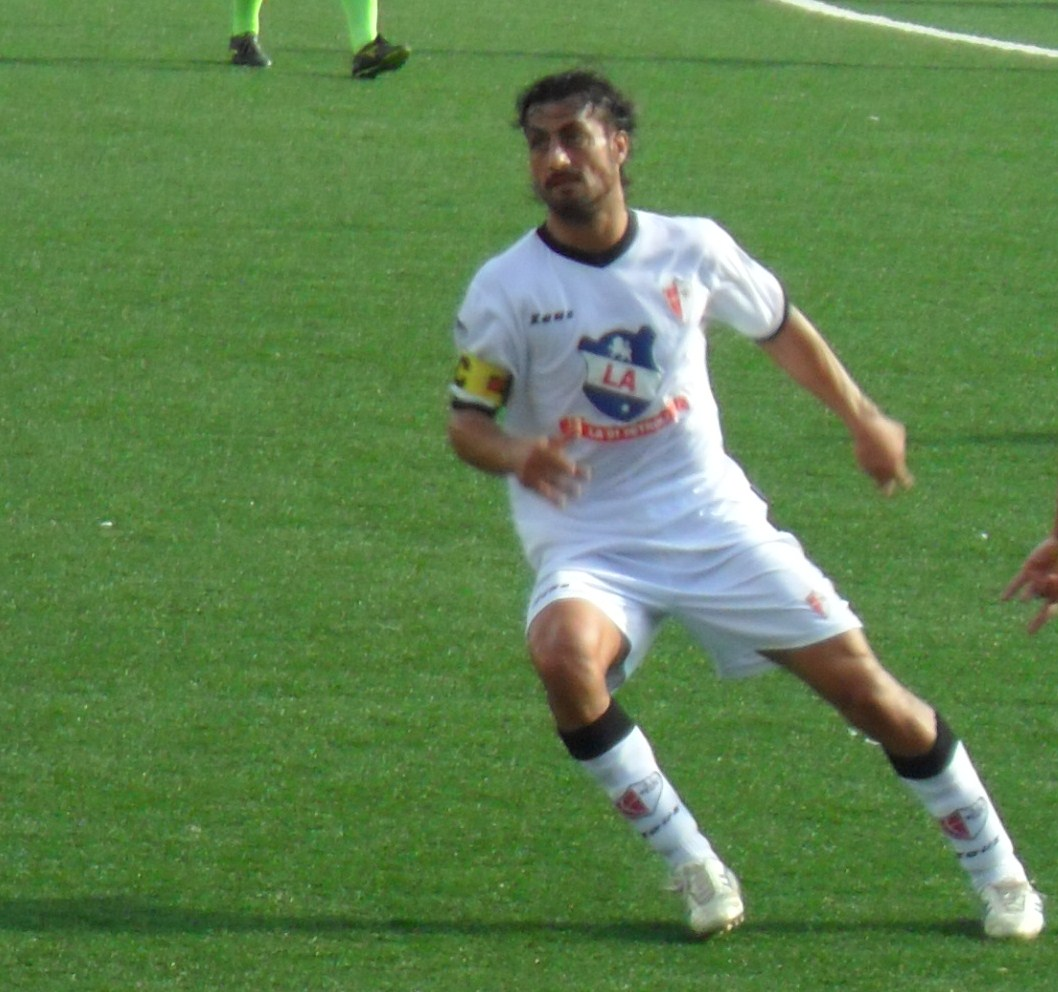
- Scarpa with Paganese in 2014

Personal information
- Date of birth: 18 June 1979 (age 47)
- Place of birth: Castellammare di Stabia, Italy
- Height: 1.76 m (5 ft 9 in)
- Position: Midfielder

Team information
- Current team: Sessana

Youth career
- –1995: Juve Stabia

Senior career*
Years	Team	Apps	(Gls)
1995–1996	Sorrento		
1996–1998	Nocerina		
1998–1999	Gragnano		
1999–2000	Internapoli		
2000	Sampolese		
2000–2001	Sapri		
2001–2002	Cavese	21	(3)
2002–2003	Gladiator	15	(1)
2003–2004	Giugliano	23	(3)
2004–2005	Fidelis Andria	30	(7)
2005–2006	Foggia	10	(2)
2006–2008	Paganese	47	(20)
2008–2009	Salernitana	37	(6)
2009–2011	Taranto	26	(1)
2011	→ Portogruaro (loan)	12	(1)
2011–2013	Paganese	60	(14)
2013–2015	Savoia	67	(34)
2015–2017	Sorrento		(24)
2017–2021	Paganese	61	(16)
2021	Angri		
2021–2022	Savoia		
2022–	Sessana		
- * Club domestic league appearances and goals as of 18:53, 2 July 2019 (UTC)

Francesco Scarpa (born 18 June 1979) is an Italian football player who plays for amateur club Sessana.

== Club career ==
He made his Serie B debut for Salernitana on 30 August 2008 in a game against Sassuolo.
