= Mario Zurlini =

Italian footballer (1942–2023)

Personal information
- Date of birth: 17 March 1942
- Place of birth: Parma, Italy
- Date of death: 16 February 2023 (aged 80)
- Height: 1.72 m (5 ft 8 in)
- Position: Defender

Youth career
- Parma

Senior career*
Years	Team	Apps	(Gls)
1962–1964	Parma		
1964–1974	Napoli	197	(2)
1975–1977	Matera		
- * Club domestic league appearances and goals

Mario Zurlini (17 March 1942 – 16 February 2023) was an Italian professional football player and manager.

== Career ==
Born in Parma, Zurlini played as a defender for Parma, Napoli and Matera.

Zurlini was later manager of a number of Italian sides. He died on 16 February 2023, at the age of 80.
