= Jone Spartano =

Italian footballer (born 1927)

Personal information
- Date of birth: 8 December 1927
- Place of birth: Castellammare di Stabia, Italy
- Position: Midfielder

Senior career*
Years	Team	Apps	(Gls)
1945–1946	Ercolanese		
1946–1949	Napoli	54	(3)
1949–1951	Roma	49	(7)
1951–1952	Udinese	23	(2)
1952–1954	Brescia	50	(3)
1954–1956	Catania	39	(0)
- * Club domestic league appearances and goals

Jone Spartano (born 8 December 1927) is an Italian retired professional football player. He was born in Castellammare di Stabia.

== Career ==
Spartano began his football career with Ercolanese before joining Napoli. He played for 6 seasons (113 games, 9 goals) in the Serie A for S.S.C. Napoli, A.S. Roma, Udinese Calcio and Calcio Catania.
