= Sandro Porchia =

Italian footballer

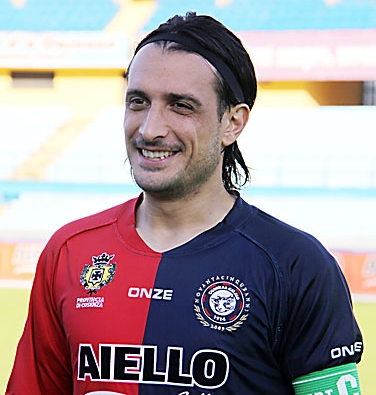

Personal information
- Full name: Sandro Antonio Porchia
- Date of birth: 14 June 1977 (age 49)
- Place of birth: Olpe, West Germany
- Height: 1.81 m (5 ft 11 in)
- Position: Defender

Youth career
- Ragusa

Senior career*
Years	Team	Apps	(Gls)
1994–1996	Ragusa	29	(2)
1996–2000	Savoia	103	(3)
2000–2005	Crotone	167	(22)
2005–2008	Rimini	89	(8)
2008–2009	Grosseto	24	(0)
2009–2010	Cosenza	28	(2)
2010–2012	Bassano Virtus	40	(2)
2012–2013	San Nicolò		
2013–2014	Ribelle		
2014–2015	Domagnano	8	(1)

Managerial career
- 2017–2019: Palermo (academy manager)
- 2019–2020: Trapani (academy manager)
- 2020: Trapani (sporting director)
- 2021: Sambenedettese (sporting director)
- * Club domestic league appearances and goals

Sandro Antonio Porchia (born 14 June 1977) is an Italian football official and a former player.

He climbed the ladder of the league system from Serie D to experienced Serie B player.
