= Generoso Rossi =

Italian footballer

Personal information
- Full name: Generoso Rossi
- Date of birth: 3 January 1979 (age 47)
- Place of birth: Naples, Italy
- Height: 1.90 m (6 ft 3 in)
- Position: Goalkeeper

Senior career*
Years	Team	Apps	(Gls)
1997–2000	Bari	6	(0)
1998–1999	→ Savoia (loan)	32	(0)
1999–2000	→ Crotone (loan)	33	(0)
2001–2002	Venezia	46	(0)
2002–2003	Palermo	0	(0)
2002–2003	→ Lecce (loan)	37	(0)
2003–2004	Siena	21	(0)
2005	Queens Park Rangers	3	(0)
2005–2008	Triestina	94	(0)
2008	→ Catania (loan)	0	(0)
2008–2009	Gallipoli	32	(0)
2010–2012	Sorrento	56	(0)
Total		360	(0)

International career
2000–2002	Italy U21	12	(0)
- * Club domestic league appearances and goals

Generoso Rossi (born 3 January 1979) is an Italian former professional footballer who played as a goalkeeper.

== Club career ==
Rossi started his career at A.S. Bari. he was on loan to Serie C1 teams, and returned to Bari in summer 2000. He made his Serie A debut on 30 September 2000, against Verona.

In January 2001, he transferred to Venezia, and then transferred to Palermo, as Maurizio Zamparini, owner of Venezia, bought Palermo. He was on loan to U.S. Lecce, and signed by A.C. Siena in summer 2003.

He was banned from football due to betting scandal, he then signed an 18-month contract with Queens Park Rangers in January 2005.

In summer 2005, he was signed by Triestina.

In January 2008, he was on loan to Calcio Catania, with Babu moving in the opposite direction. Rossi became the third choice goalkeeper at Catania, behind Ciro Polito and Albano Bizarri, and was ahead of Raffaele Ioime.

During 2008/2009 season, Rossi was transferred to Gallipoli in Lega Pro Prima Divisione – B. Although the club won Serie B promotion, the team faced financial difficulty, Rossi did not stay at the club.

In February 2010, Rossi was signed by Sorrento. Rossi spent the next two and a half seasons at Sorrento and became an integral member of the team that twice nearly gained promotion to Serie B. In summer 2012, after the resignation of Sorrento's president and much speculation as to whether the club would continue, Rossi left Sorrento to seek employment elsewhere. After spending a long period out of the game he was re-signed by Sorrento on a free contract in November 2012.

== International career ==
Rossi was capped for Italy at youth level in 2000 in the Toulon Tournament and called up to the under 21 squad for the 2002 UEFA European Under-21 Football Championship.

== Honours ==
Sorrento

- Lega Pro Prima Divisione: 2009
