= Osvaldo Jaconi =

Italian footballer (born 1947)

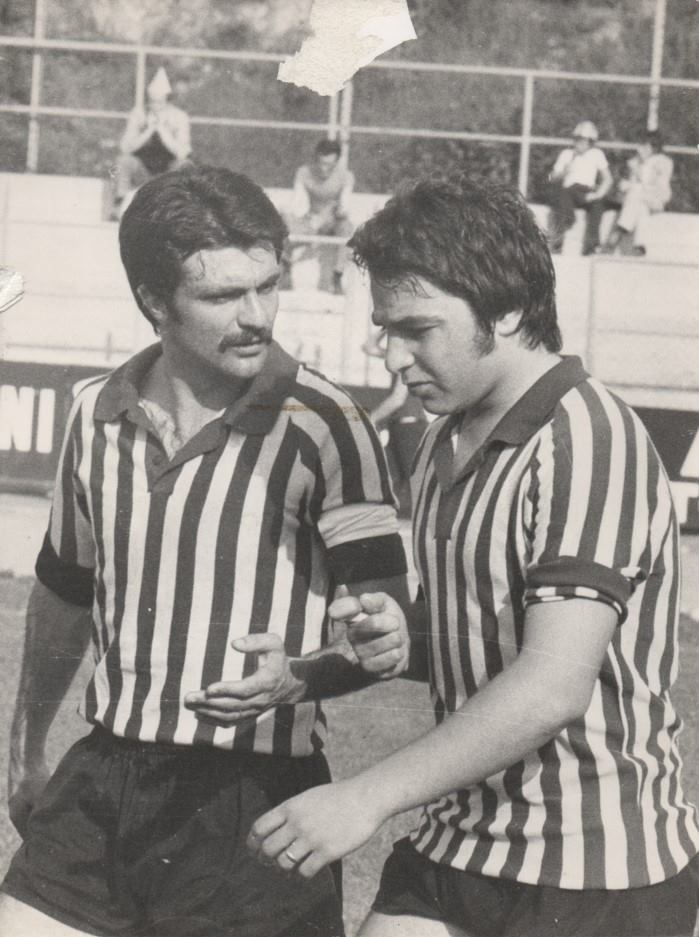
- Jaconi (left) and Vito Chimenti with Lecco in the 1973–74 season

Personal information
- Date of birth: 16 January 1947 (age 79)
- Place of birth: Mandello del Lario, Italy
- Height: 1.71 m (5 ft 7 in)
- Position: Midfielder

Senior career*
Years	Team	Apps	(Gls)
1963–1974	Lecco		
1974–1976	Teramo		
1976–1978	Riccione		
1978–1979	Civitanovese		

Managerial career
- 1982–1984: Civitanovese
- 1984–1986: Fano
- 1986–1987: Rimini
- 1987–1988: Catania
- 1988–1989: Rimini
- 1989–1990: Lecco
- 1990–1993: Leonzio
- 1993–1998: Castel di Sangro
- 1998–2000: Savoia
- 2000–2002: Livorno
- 2002–2003: Catania
- 2003: Lucchese
- 2003–2004: Ravenna
- 2004–2005: Novara
- 2005–2007: Ivrea
- 2007–2008: Fidelis Andria
- 2008–2009: Civitanovese
- 2010–2012: Bassano
- 2013–2014: Civitanovese
- 2014–2016: Fermana
- * Club domestic league appearances and goals

Osvaldo Jaconi (born 16 January 1947) is an Italian football manager and former footballer. He played in the 1966–67 Serie A with Lecco.

== Playing career ==
Jaconi retired from playing professional football in 1982.

== Managerial career ==
Jaconi achieved eleven promotions during his career, the most of any Italian football manager.

== Personal life ==
Jaconi is a native of Lombardy, Italy.
