= Kingsmeadow (stadium) =

Football stadium in Kingston upon Thames, UK

Coordinates: 51°24′18″N 0°16′55″W

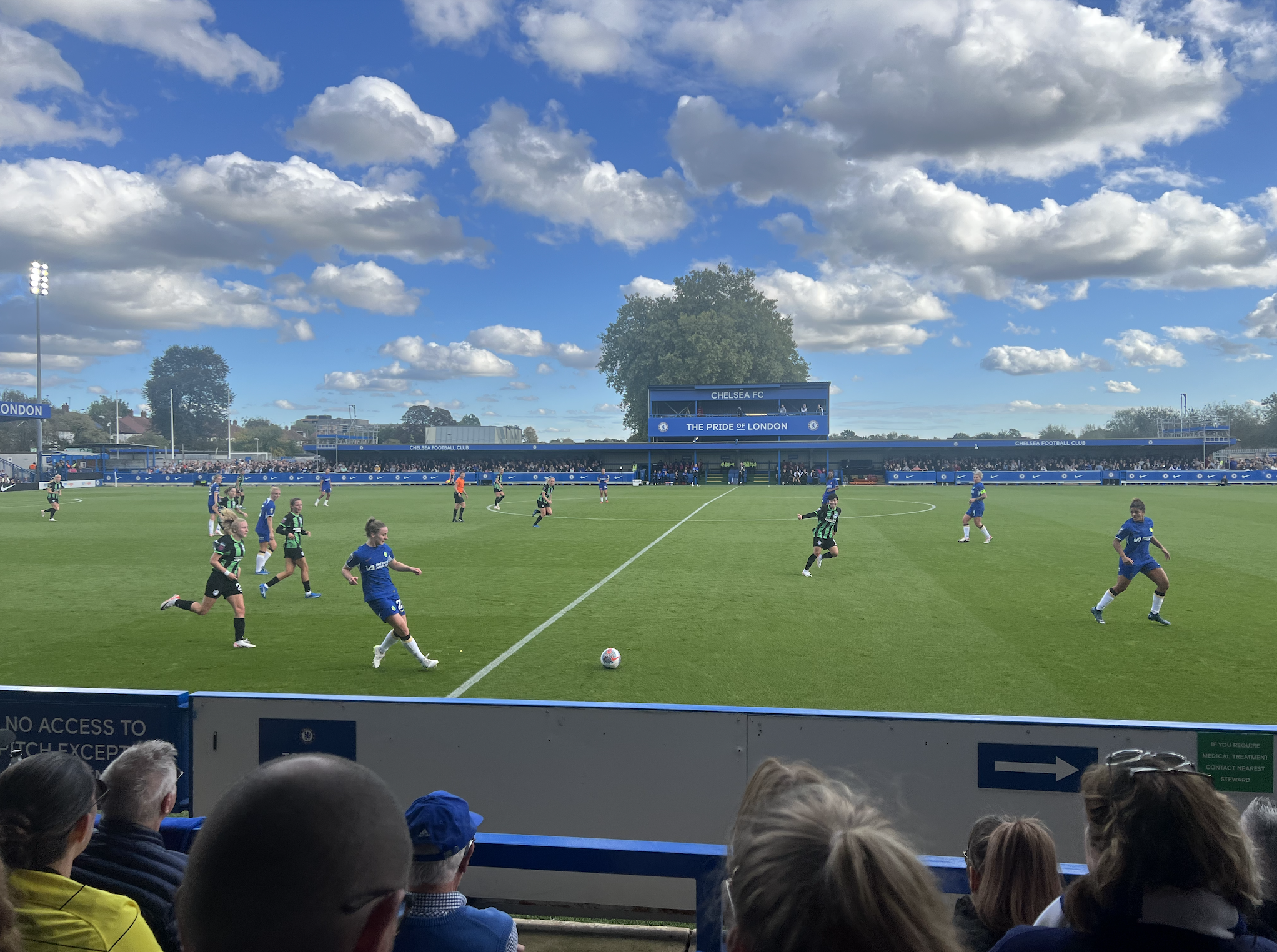
- Interactive map of Kingsmeadow
- Full name: Kingsmeadow
- Location: Jack Goodchild Way, Kingston upon Thames, London, England
- Owner: Chelsea
- Operator: Chelsea
- Capacity: 4,850 (2,265 seated)
- Surface: Grass
- Field size: 110 × 75 yards
- Public transit: Norbiton

Construction
- Built: 1989
- Opened: 1989

Tenants
- Kingstonian (1989–2017); AFC Wimbledon (2002–2020); Chelsea Women (2017–2026); Cobham Next Gen (2020–present)

Kingsmeadow is a football stadium in Norbiton, Kingston upon Thames, London, which is used for home matches by Chelsea Women and Cobham Next Gen. It was formerly the home of Kingstonian and AFC Wimbledon and has a capacity of 4,850 with 2,265 seats.

== History ==
The stadium was the home of Kingstonian from 1989, when they built the entire complex on the site following the sale of their former Richmond Road ground. Kingstonian opened the ground with a friendly against Queens Park Rangers. Following relegation from the Conference, Kingstonian went into financial administration and both the club and ground were purchased by Rajesh Khosla and his son Anup.

AFC Wimbledon played at the stadium from their foundation in 2002 until their move to a new stadium on Plough Lane in 2020; Wimbledon having moved to Milton Keynes in September 2003, becoming Milton Keynes Dons in June 2004. AFC Wimbledon were in the Combined Counties League at this time, but reached Football League One in 2016.

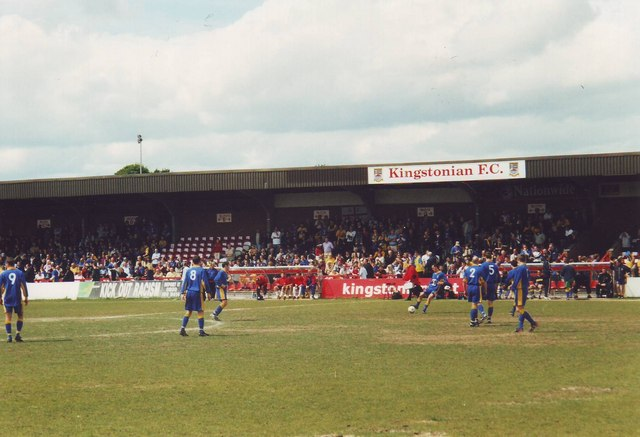
Kingsmeadow in 2003

After one season as tenants of the Khoslas, AFC Wimbledon undertook to buy the leasehold of the ground. The club's owners, the Dons Trust, launched a share issue to finance the purchase, which was closed the following summer. The club subsequently arranged for a commercial loan to clear the remaining debt to the Khoslas. Upon taking over the ground, its name was changed to the Fans' Stadium which remains the nickname of the ground today.

In November 2015, AFC Wimbledon supporters backed a proposal to sell the ground to Chelsea, who were interested in using the ground for its youth teams and women's team. The sale was hugely detrimental to Kingstonian, with them unable to play in a ground that was now too big and expensive for a non-league side and over which they no longer had any control. Kingstonian started a groundshare with Leatherhead in 2017–8, and then moved to King George's Field in Tolworth, sharing with Corinthian Casuals from the 2018–19 season.

Kingsmeadow became the new home of Chelsea Women, beginning with the 2017–18 FA WSL season. AFC Wimbledon departed Kingsmeadow for the new Plough Lane stadium in May 2020.

In April 2026, after nine years of playing at Kingsmeadow, Chelsea Women announced that for the 2026–27 FA WSL season and onwards they would be moving to play all of their home matches at Stamford Bridge instead of Kingsmeadow, but would be retaining the ground for the use of Cobham Next Gen and Chelsea academy teams.

== Ownership ==
The freehold of the site is owned by Kingston Council. The leasehold, which safeguards the site for the borough's football team, was originally held by Kingstonian. After Kingstonian entered administration to avoid bankruptcy and lost the Kingsmeadow lease in October 2001, it was assigned in April 2002 by the administrators to a property developer, Rajesh Khosla, who was also by then owner of the club. In June 2003, he sold the lease to AFC Wimbledon, who at the time were already sub-tenants at the ground. Kingstonian secured a 25-year sub-tenancy agreement with AFC Wimbledon, with customary break clauses. The two clubs then operated a ground-sharing arrangement until 2017, with Kingstonian receiving preferentially cheap rental terms. The ground underwent various structural improvements and expansion during this period.

The ground's lease is currently owned by Chelsea, having purchased it from AFC Wimbledon in 2015, in order to use it for their women's and youth sides. Chelsea Women moved in for the start of the 2017–18 FA WSL 1 season.

== Structure and facilities ==
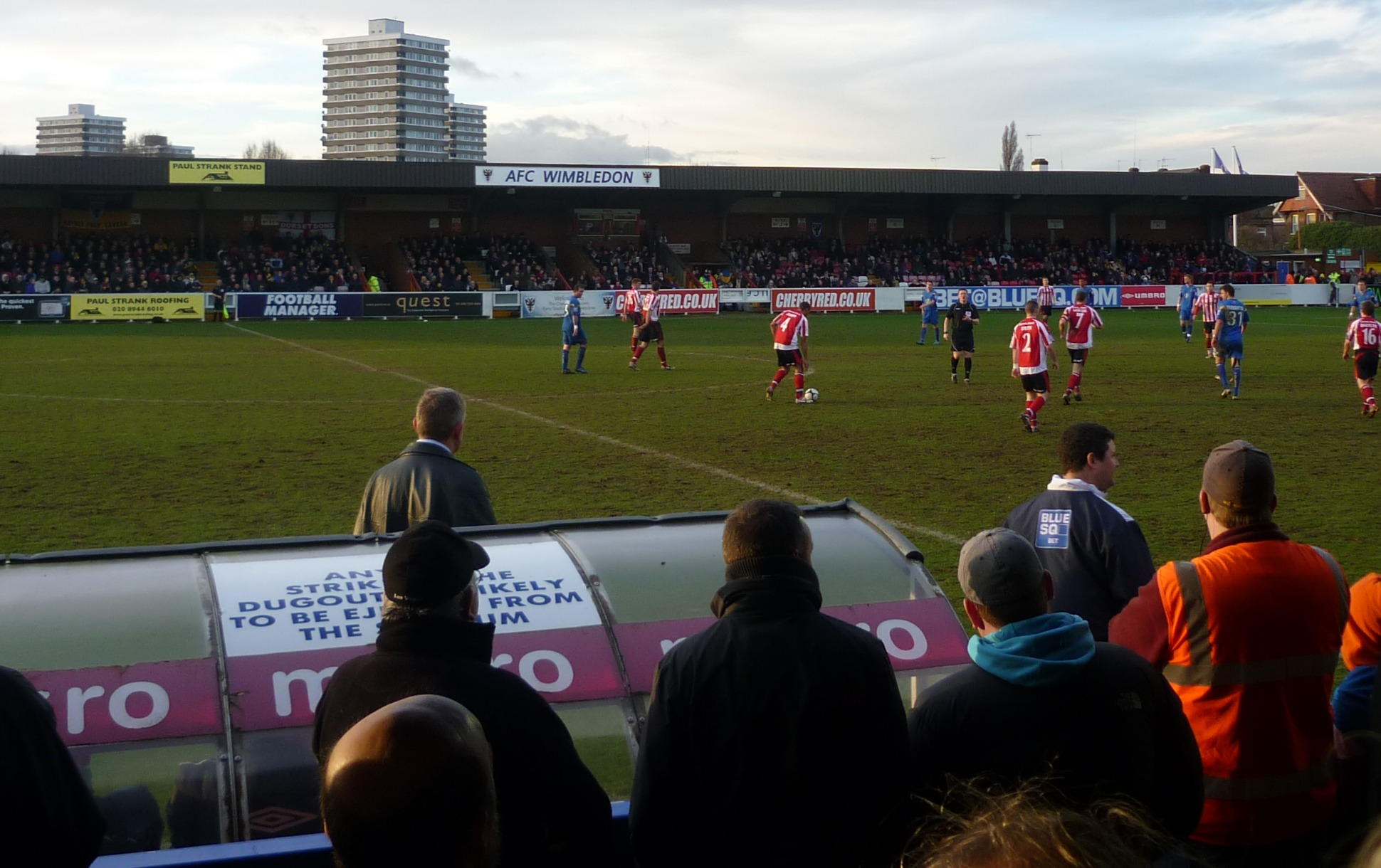
Kingsmeadow in 2011

Kingsmeadow comprises the following stands (as they were named under AFC Wimbledon sponsorship):

- John Green Stand – (formerly the "Nongshim Stand") a newly built, covered behind-the-goal all-seater stand with 1,000 seats. It was first sponsored by Nong Shim Ltd., South Korea's largest processed food manufacturer, whose UK head office is based locally in New Malden. The rebuilding of the stand increased the stadium capacity to approximately 4,850. It was renamed the "John Green Stand" for the 2015 season after the American author, whose keen interest in the team has led to a sponsorship agreement. Before the start of the 2015–16 season the club installed a camera gantry above the stand in order to get different angles for replays to be shown on Dons Player.
- Paul Strank Stand – the all-seater main stand with 1,265 seats, which also includes the stadium's changing rooms, offices, three bars and other facilities. The main stand was extended during the 2008–09 season, adding more seats and also extending the roof to provide better protection from rain. It was also renamed the Paul Strank Stand at this time, after a supporter and benefactor of AFC Wimbledon.
- RyGas Stand – (formerly the "East Stand" and "Your Golf Travel Stand") is a partially covered shallow terrace along the length of the pitch, opposite the main Paul Strank Stand. This stand also holds the camera gantry at the stadium as well as the scoreboard.
- Chemflow End – (formerly the "Athletics End" and the "Tempest End") a covered behind-the-goal deep terrace. Its original name came from the Kingston Athletics Centre which sits directly behind the stand. The terrace was covered during the 2005–06 season and renamed the Tempest End in recognition of the sponsorship of Tempest Sports, Wimbledon's exclusive kit manufacturer since the club's inception, who had partially paid for the development. For the 2013–14 season the stand was renamed the EcoHouse End in a new sponsorship deal with the now defunct EcoHouse Group, which had its main European office in nearby Richmond. During 2016 the stand was renamed the Chemflow End in another sponsorship deal.

As of October 2012, the stadium had a capacity of 4,850. It originally was designated to have a 6,299 capacity before modern safety requirements and ground improvements (such as re-profiling the Athletics End terrace and replacing the original terraced paddock in front of the main stand with seats) required the capacity to be reduced. Kingstonian's highest attendance at Kingsmeadow was 4,582 for a friendly against Chelsea on 22 July 1995. AFC Wimbledon's highest attendance at Kingsmeadow and the ground's overall record attendance was 4,870 against Accrington Stanley on 14 May 2016.

The stadium is adjacent to an athletics stadium used by Kingston Athletic Club and Polytechnic Harriers.
