= Petrillo (surname) =

Petrillo is an Italian surname. Some people with this surname include:

- Alessio De Petrillo (born 1967), Italian football player and coach
- Andi Petrillo (born 1980), Canadian hockey broadcaster
- Chiara Corbella Petrillo (1984–2012), Italian activist and Servant of God
- Ferdinando De Petrillo, Italian boxer who competed in the 1924 Summer Olympics
- James Petrillo (1892–1984), leader of the American Federation of Musicians
- Luigi Petrillo (1903–1964), Italian pentathlete
- Sammy Petrillo (1934–2009), American comedian best known as a Jerry Lewis lookalike
- Steven M. Petrillo (born 1958), American politician
- Valentina Petrillo (born 1973), Italian Paralympic athlete

== Fictional characters ==
- Sophia Petrillo, character played by Estelle Getty on the TV series The Golden Girls

== See also ==
- Petrillo (disambiguation)
