= Anthony Emery =

Anthony Emery may refer to:

- Anthony Armstrong Emery, entrepreneur
- Anthony Emery (bishop) (1918–1988), bishop
- Tony Emery (1927–2005), footballer
