= AC Monza =

Association football club in Monza, Italy

Monza
- Full name: Associazione Calcio Monza S.p.A.
- Nicknames: I Biancorossi (The White and Reds); I Brianzoli (The Ones from Brianza); I Bagai (The Boys) (Note: In Brianzöö dialect)
- Founded: 1 September 1912 (114 years ago) as Monza FBC; 3 June 2004 (22 years ago) as AC Monza Brianza 1912; 2 July 2015 (11 years ago) as SSD Monza 1912
- Stadium: Stadio Brianteo
- Capacity: 17,102
- Owner: Beckett Layne Ventures
- President: Lauren Crampsie
- Head coach: Ivan Jurić
- League: Serie A
- 2025–26: Serie B, 3rd of 20 (promoted via play-off)
- Website: acmonza.com
Home colours	Away colours	Third colours

Associazione Calcio Monza (Italian pronunciation: [ˈmontsa]), commonly referred to as Monza, is a professional football club based in Monza, Lombardy, Italy. The team plays in Serie A, the top tier of Italian football, following promotion from Serie B in the 2025–26 season.

Founded in 1912 as Monza FBC, the club spent much of its history in the lower divisions, narrowly missing out on promotion to Serie A on several occasions in the 1970s. Monza faced financial difficulties in the early 21st century, resulting in bankruptcy in 2004 and 2015. After being acquired by Silvio Berlusconi in 2018, the club returned to Serie B in 2020 after a 19-year absence and secured their first-ever promotion to Serie A in 2022. The club had previously held the Italian record for most Serie B seasons played without ever reaching Serie A (40).

Monza have won the Coppa Italia Serie C a record four times, the Serie C championship four times, and an Anglo-Italian Cup. The club originally wore blue and white, but adopted their current red and white colours in 1932; as a result, the team are nicknamed i biancorossi (the white and reds). Since 1988, Monza have played home matches at the Stadio Brianteo. The club's main rivals include Como, Pro Sesto and Pisa.

== History ==
=== Foundation and first tournaments (1912–1927) ===
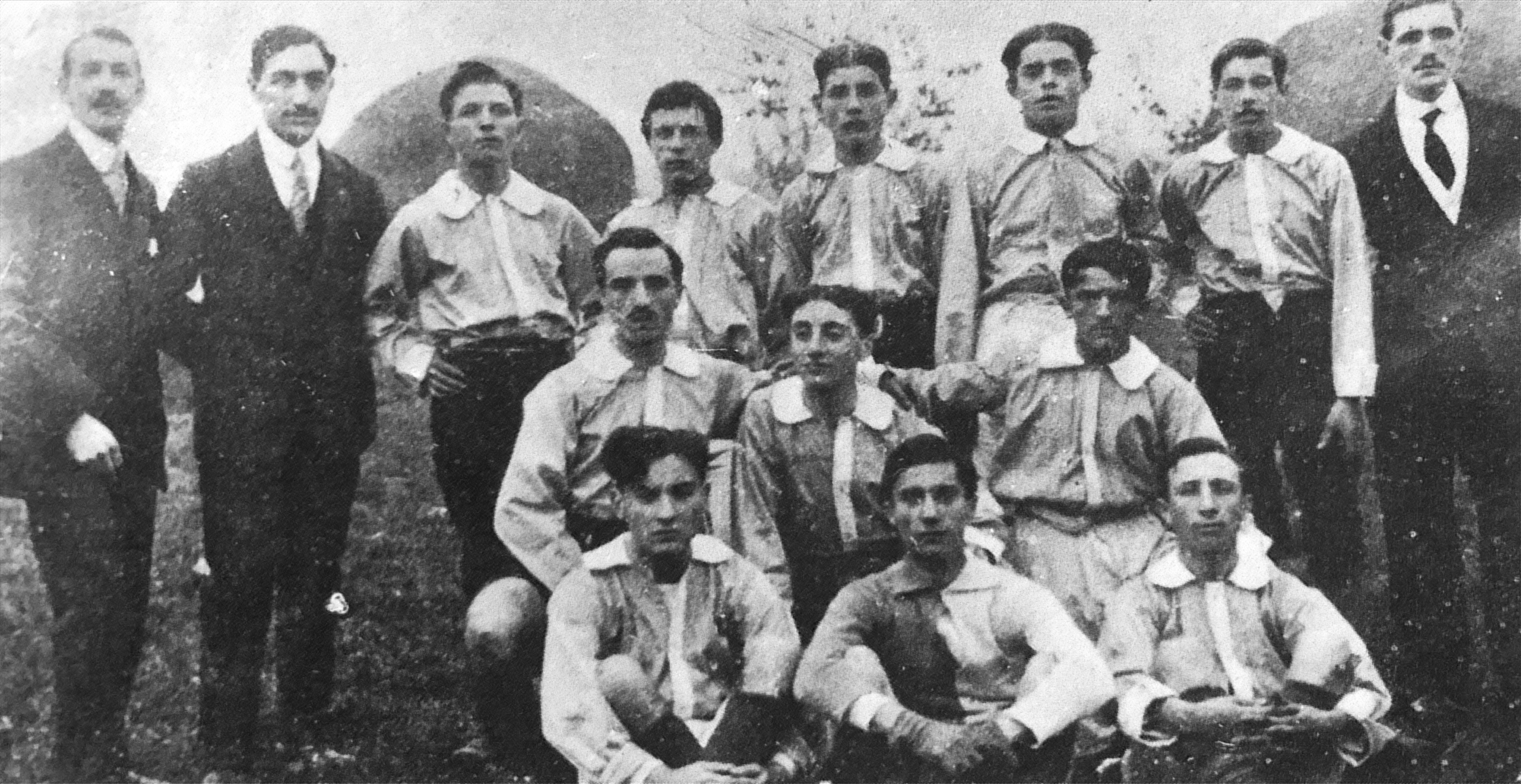
Monza's first lineup in 1912

Monza Foot-Ball Club was founded on 1 September 1912 in the Cappello Vecchio trattoria, following the merger of the Monza-based clubs Pro Italia and Pro Monza. The new club established their first headquarters in the Roma coffeehouse located on the similarly named town square in Monza; the team initially wore a blue and white kit. Monza's first recorded game was against a team from Milan, while their first win came on 20 September 1912 when they beat Juventus Italia 2–1 in Triante. The club won their first trophy, the Coppa Colli, in early 1913 after beating Saronno 3–2 in the final.

In November 1913, Monza FBC merged with Juventus FBC (a group of athletes formerly part of the Forti e Liberi sports club) to form Associazione Calcio Monza. Monza first competed in Terza Categoria (third level) in the 1913–14 season; they played their first match on 4 January 1914, losing 3–1 at home against Fanfulla. The following season, Monza took part in the Promozione (second level), finishing fourth in their group of six. Despite the outbreak of World War I, when conscription forced teams to send their adult players to war, Monza were able to continue their sporting activity with young players.

Between 1915 and 1918, the war interrupted official tournaments. Upon the resumption of football in 1919, Monza took part in the 1919–20 Promozione (second level). Having finished first in their group, Monza played the promotion finals against Trevigliese, losing 2–1. The Italian Football Federation, however, decided to promote Monza via repechage, and the team were placed in Prima Categoria, the top tier of Italian football. In 1919, Monza hosted the Czechoslovakia military national team for a friendly game at Grazie Vecchie field that ended in a 1–1 draw.

Monza were grouped with Milan, Cremonese and Pro Patria in their qualifying group for Prima Categoria. Their first game was played on 24 October 1920, a 4–1 home defeat to Milan; Francesco Mandelli scored Monza's lone goal. They finished the 1920–21 season with no points and in last place in their group. The following season, Monza finished second in their group, missing out on the final stage by one position. Due to a restructuring of the league system, Monza were moved to the Seconda Divisione (second level) for the 1922–23 season; they avoided relegation by beating Chiasso and Canottieri Lecco in the play-offs. In 1926–27, after beating Ponziana 3–2 in the final, Monza were declared champions of Seconda Divisione Lega Nord (third level) and were promoted to the Prima Divisione (second level).

=== Biancorossi and Serie B promotion (1932–1953) ===
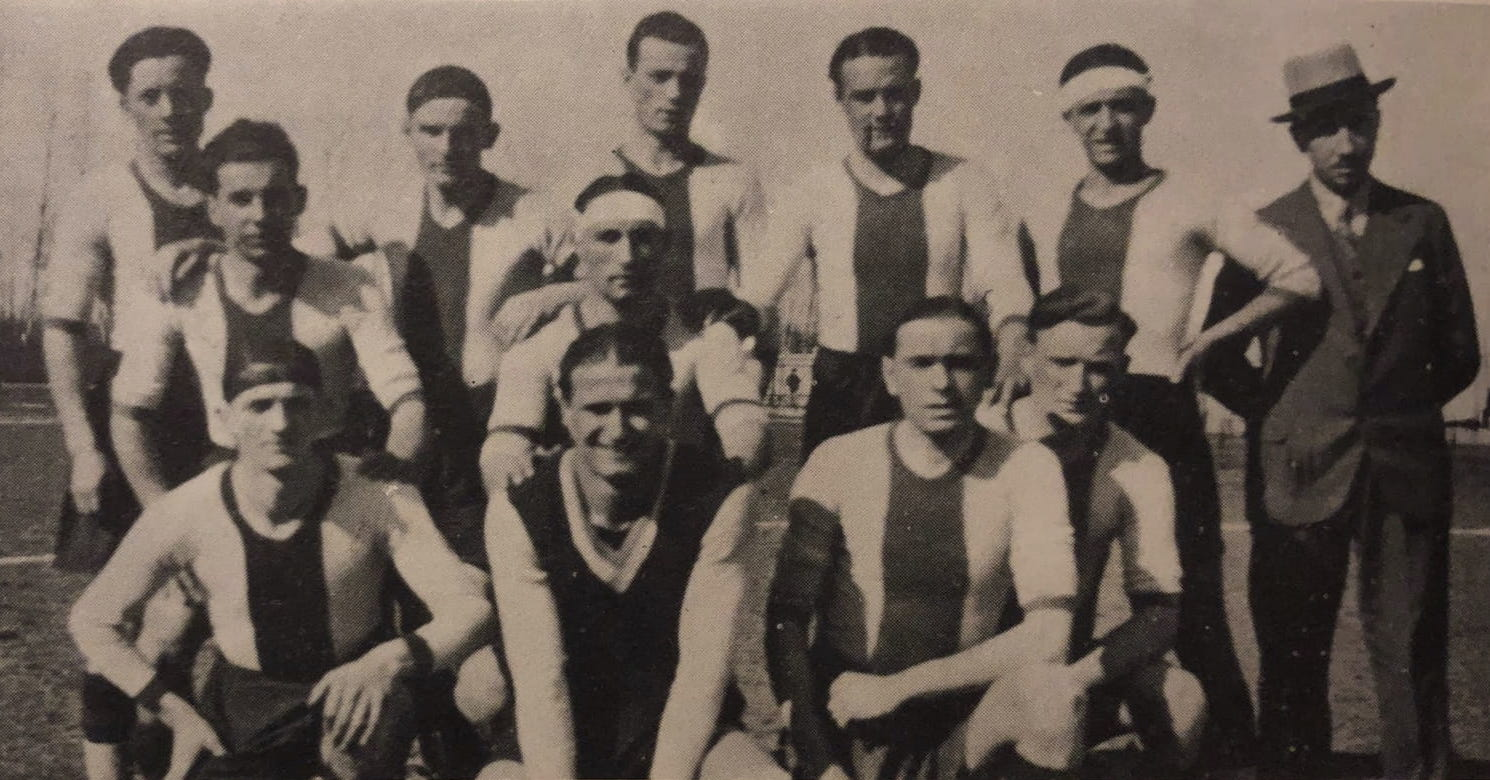
Starting from the 1933–34 season, Monza wore red-and-white kits.

During the 1930s and 1940s Monza played in Prima Divisione (third level), which became the Serie C in 1935. In September 1932, ahead of the 1932–33 season, Monza changed their shirt colours to red and white, which they have worn ever since. They became nicknamed "i biancorossi" (the white and reds) following the colour change. Monza finished in first place the following season and played a round-robin tournament with three other teams for promotion to the Serie B (second level); they finished fourth and failed to move up to the second level. On 23 April 1939, the club reached the Coppa Italia quarter-finals, losing 2–1 to Serie A side Genoa. They became the first Serie C team to reach the quarter-finals of the competition.

Between 1942 and 1945, World War II interrupted football in Italy. Following the war, Monza were placed in Serie C (third level), finishing eighth in the 1945–46 season. They came close to promotion the following season, finishing third in the promotion play-offs. In 1947, Peppino Borghi became president of Monza. Monza, who were coached by Annibale Frossi, headed into the 1950–51 Serie C with a strong transfer campaign. On 4 June 1951, Monza played away to Omegna in the season's second-to-last match; Carlo Colombetti of Monza scored the match's only goal with a penalty kick, giving Monza their first promotion to Serie B.

Monza debuted in Serie B on 9 September 1951, drawing to Siracusa 1–1 away from home. The team only avoided relegation on the last matchday with a 2–1 home win against Piombino. Against most experts' pre-season expectations, Monza finished the 1952–53 Serie B in fourth position, three points behind automatic promotion in second place.

=== Simmenthal merger and aftermath (1955–1967) ===
In July 1955, ahead of the 1955–56 season, Monza merged with Prima Divisione (sixth level) side GS Simmenthal, the football club of the Simmenthal food company. AC Monza was renamed AC Simmenthal-Monza, and was headed by Simmenthal owner Claudio Sada. The merger helped fund subsequent transfer campaigns. The match between Monza and Verona on 8 October 1955 was the first free-to-air televised match in Italy. Monza's first season under the new management was positive, finishing the season in third place. In the following years, until the end of their merger in 1964, Monza alternated positive seasons (fourth and fifth place in 1958 and 1961, respectively) with negative ones (16th and 15th in 1960 and 1964). On 14 July 1964, Simmenthal ceased to sponsor Monza and the club reverted to its former name.

Despite Monza's stable financial situation, (Note: In 1964, Monza and Serie A club Bologna were the only Italian teams to have positive balances in the first two divisions.) no one was interested in purchasing the club; Sada decided to remain president for the following season. While Monza barely avoided relegation in the 1964–65 season, the same could not be said about the next season: following 15 years of second-tier football, Monza were relegated to Serie C in the last matchday of the season, drawing 0–0 away to Mantova on 19 June 1966. After winning the 1966–67 play-off game against Como 1–0, thanks to a lone goal by Gianluigi Maggioni in the 32nd minute, Monza were promoted back to Serie B after one year.

=== Serie A promotion attempts (1969–1979) ===
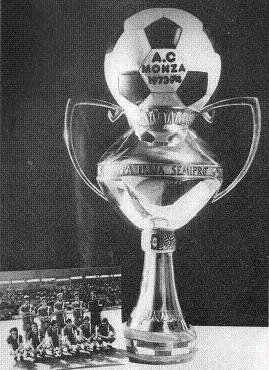
The 1973–74 Coppa Italia Semiprofessionisti won by Monza

Three years after their Serie B promotion, Monza came close to reaching Serie A for the first time in the 1969–70 Serie B under coach Luigi Radice; they needed an away win against first-placed Varese to keep their promotion chances alive on the second-to-last matchday. On 7 June 1970, after just two minutes of play, Monza took the lead through Roberto Caremi; in the sixth minute, Giampaolo Lanzetti failed to double the lead, wasting a clear chance in front of the goal. Varese won 2–1, preventing Monza from gaining promotion.

In mid-1972, Giovanni Cappelletti became president of the club. In his first year in charge, Monza were relegated to Serie C after losing the last match of the 1972–73 season away to Bari 3–1. Despite their relegation, Monza saw success in the Coppa Italia Semiprofessionisti, reaching the finals in 1974, 1975 and 1976, winning the first two over Lecce and Sorrento, and losing the third in a repeat of the first final. Five matches before the end of the 1975–76 season, Monza were promoted back to Serie B; they also won an Anglo-Italian Cup on 19 June 1976, beating Wimbledon 1–0 in the final through a Francesco Casagrande goal.

During the late 1970s, Monza came close to gaining promotion to Serie A on multiple occasions. The first time was as a newly promoted team in the 1976–77 season, when they lost the season's final match 2–1 against Modena through an 81st-minute own goal. The following season went in a similar fashion for Monza, losing out to direct promotion in the second-to-last matchday against Pistoiese. In the 1978–79 Serie B season Monza again missed out on promotion in the final matches, being defeated by already-relegated Lecce in the second-to-last match. Monza tied with Pescara on points for third place and the two sides played a promotion tie-breaker, which Monza lost 2–0. In Cappelletti's last season as president, in 1979–80, Monza failed to gain promotion to the top flight for the fourth consecutive year. Four games from the end of the season, Monza were in third place in a spot for direct promotion; decisive defeats against Cesena and Brescia meant that Monza finished in fifth place, three points from Serie A promotion.

=== Valentino Giambelli presidency (1980–1999) ===
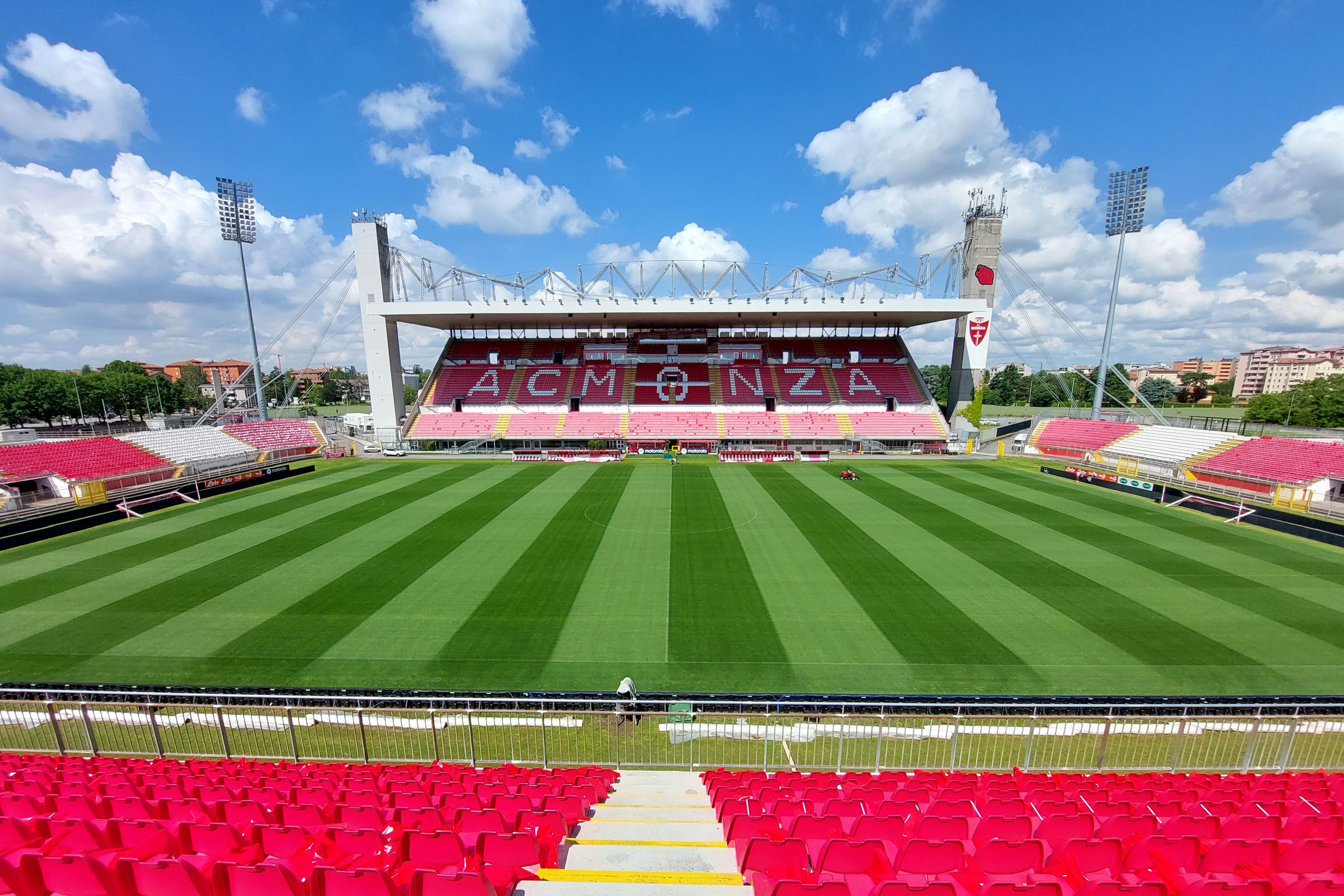
The Stadio Brianteo (2024) has hosted Monza's home games since 1988.

Valentino Giambelli became the club president in 1980, succeeding Cappelletti, and the club was renamed Calcio Monza. In the 1980–81 Serie B, Monza played in a championship with historical sides Milan and Lazio; both of whom had been relegated from Serie A following the 1980 Totonero scandal. Monza finished in last place and were relegated to Serie C1 (third level), but were promoted back one season later. They remained in Serie B for a further four seasons before being relegated in 1986.

In the 1986–87 Serie C1, players such as Alessandro Costacurta, Francesco Antonioli and Pierluigi Casiraghi, who later became established names in Italian football, made their professional debuts with Monza. Captained by Pierluigi Frosio, Monza gained promotion to Serie B in the 1987–88 season, and also won their third Coppa Italia Serie C, (Note: The Coppa Italia Semiprofessionisti changed its name to Coppa Italia Serie C in 1981.) beating Palermo 2–1 at home following a goalless draw away. The second leg, which was played on 11 June 1988, was Monza's last game in the Stadio Gino Alfonso Sada, after which the team moved to the newly constructed Stadio Brianteo. The first match was played at the new stadium on 28 August 1988, when over 10,000 spectators attended Monza's Coppa Italia game against Serie A club Roma; against expectations, Monza won 2–1 with goals by Casiraghi and Carmelo Mancuso.

After having closely avoided relegation in 1988–89 on goal difference, Monza lost the 1989–90 Serie B relegation play-off against Messina on 7 June 1990, and were relegated to Serie C1. On 13 June 1991, Monza won a record fourth Coppa Italia Serie C, beating Palermo in the final. They gained promotion to Serie B in the 1991–92 season but two years later, Monza finished the 1993–94 season in last place and returned to the third tier.

In March 1997, Giambelli signed a collaboration agreement with Milan and Monza became a satellite team of the Rossoneri, the first of its kind in Italy. In June 1997, Monza returned to Serie B after defeating Carpi 3–2 in the promotion play-off final; they were coached by Luigi Radice, who had also helped them to promotion 30 years prior. The following season, newly promoted Monza changed most of their roster, introducing young players, many of whom came from Milan's youth sector. The team closed the season having been on the verge of relegation.

=== Financial instability (1999–2018) ===
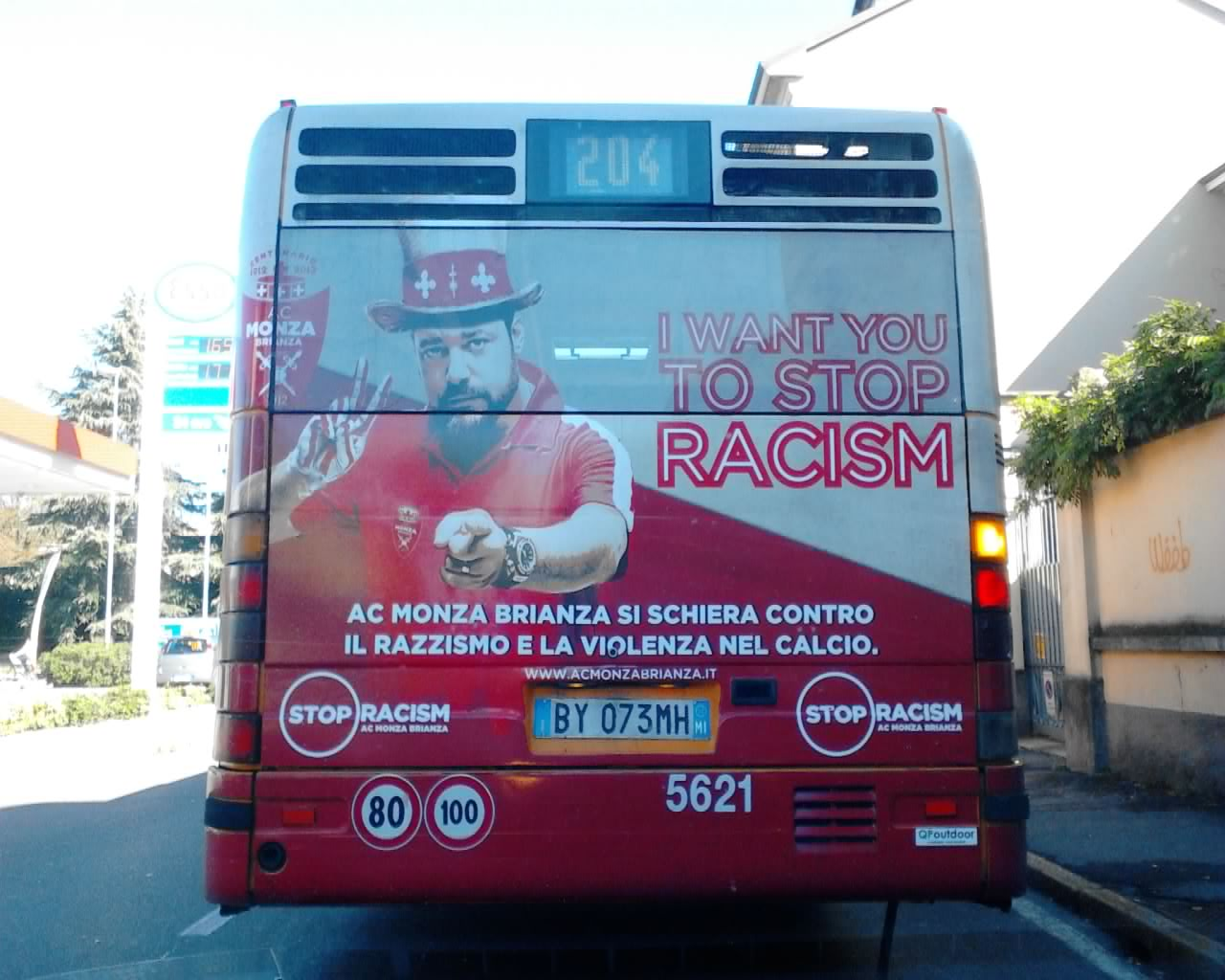
A bus with advertising by Anthony Armstrong Emery against racism in football (2013)

In April 1999, after 19 years of presidency, Giambelli left the club amid criticism from fans concerning Monza's close connection with Milan and their CEO Adriano Galliani. With Giambelli's departure, Monza ceased to be Milan's satellite team. The club entered a period of instability, changing owners twice in five years. Monza were relegated to Serie C1 in 2001 and then, for the first time, to Serie C2 (fourth level) in 2002. Amid Monza's financial troubles, on 31 December 2003 the comune of Monza cut the supply of water and gas of Stadio Brianteo after the club was unable to pay the bills; Monza was forced to play home games at Stadio Breda in neighbouring Sesto San Giovanni.

On 18 March 2004, Monza was declared bankrupt. On 3 June the same year, the club was acquired by Atalanta vice-president Gian Battista Begnini, who renamed it AC Monza Brianza 1912. Monza took part in the 2004–05 Serie C2; despite being eliminated in the promotion play-off semi-finals, they were admitted to Serie C1 via repechage. Monza twice came close to promotion to Serie B, losing two consecutive play-off finals. In the 2005–06 season, after having lost at home 2–0, Monza won the away leg to Genoa 1–0, having missed many chances to score further goals. The 2006–07 season was even more dramatic: in the first leg at home, Monza beat Pisa thanks to a 74th-minute penalty. In the second leg, a first-half goal by Pisa forced the game into extra time, and Pisa scored again to secure promotion at Monza's expense.

On 13 July 2009, Begnini sold the club to the PaSport holding company, headed by former Milan player Clarence Seedorf. The new ownership did not last long: in 2012 the club was relegated to Serie C2 and, on 12 May 2013, was sold to Anthony Armstrong Emery. Following broken promises regarding an increase in finances in the club, Monza was sold again, on 12 December 2014, to Dennis Bingham for €1. The new president was contested straight away by fans for not paying the players' salaries.

Following the club's sale to Piero Montaquila in March 2015, Monza won the 2014–15 Lega Pro relegation play-offs against Pordenone, and were due to remain in the third level the following season. However, Monza were declared bankrupt on 27 May. The club was acquired by Nicola Colombo on 2 July that year and was renamed SSD Monza 1912. Monza registered to the Serie D (fourth level) on 31 July and finished the 2015–16 season mid-table. In May 2016, the club changed its name to SS Monza 1912 and achieved promotion back to Serie C under coach Marco Zaffaroni in 2017. Having won Group B of Serie D, the team took part in the competition's poule scudetto (a post-season competition to determine the best non-professional Italian team); they won the Scudetto Serie D trophy after defeating Ravenna 2–1 in the final.

=== Berlusconi presidency (2018–2025) ===
On 28 September 2018, the holding company Fininvest, which was headed by former Milan president Silvio Berlusconi, announced its acquisition of Monza for approximately €3 million; Monza-born Adriano Galliani, formerly CEO of Milan, also became part of the board of directors. The Berlusconi–Galliani duo had been one of the most successful leaderships in football history, having won 29 trophies with Milan between 1986 and 2016. According to Forbes's 2021 ranking, Berlusconi was the richest owner of a football club in Italy, and ninth worldwide, with his fortune being valued at $7.6 billion.

In the first season under the new leadership, Monza finished the 2018–19 Serie C in fifth place with Cristian Brocchi as coach, and lost to Viterbese in the final minute of the Coppa Italia Serie C final. On 1 July 2019, the club returned to its historical name AC Monza. Aiming for direct promotion to Serie B, Monza reinforced their squad with players with Serie A experience to prepare for the 2019–20 season. In March 2020, Monza held first position with a 16-point-lead over second-placed Carrarese. The same month, the Lega Pro committee announced the suspension of the league due to the COVID-19 pandemic. On 8 June, the Italian Football Federation formally declared Monza champions and the team were promoted to Serie B after a 19-year absence from the competition.

Monza headed into the 2020–21 Serie B as the club most likely to finish in first place, according to most bookmakers. Having finished the first half of the season in second place, in a spot for direct promotion, Monza dropped one position at the end of the season and took part in the promotion play-offs; they lost to Cittadella 3–2 on aggregate in the semi-finals. Brocchi was dismissed at the end of the season, and was replaced by Giovanni Stroppa as head coach.

In the 2021–22 season, Monza lost to Perugia and missed out on direct Serie A promotion in the last matchday. Having finished in fourth place, Monza played the play-off semi-finals where they defeated Brescia and reached the final against Pisa. Monza won the first leg at home 2–1, while Pisa won the second leg 3–2. Two goals in extra time by Monza won them the encounter 4–3 (6–4 on aggregate), to earn promotion to the 2022–23 Serie A for the first time. Prior to their promotion, Monza had competed in 40 Serie B seasons, the most of any Italian club without ever being promoted to the first division. Christian Gytkjær was key to helping Monza to promotion, scoring five goals in the playoffs.

==== Serie A (2022–2025) ====
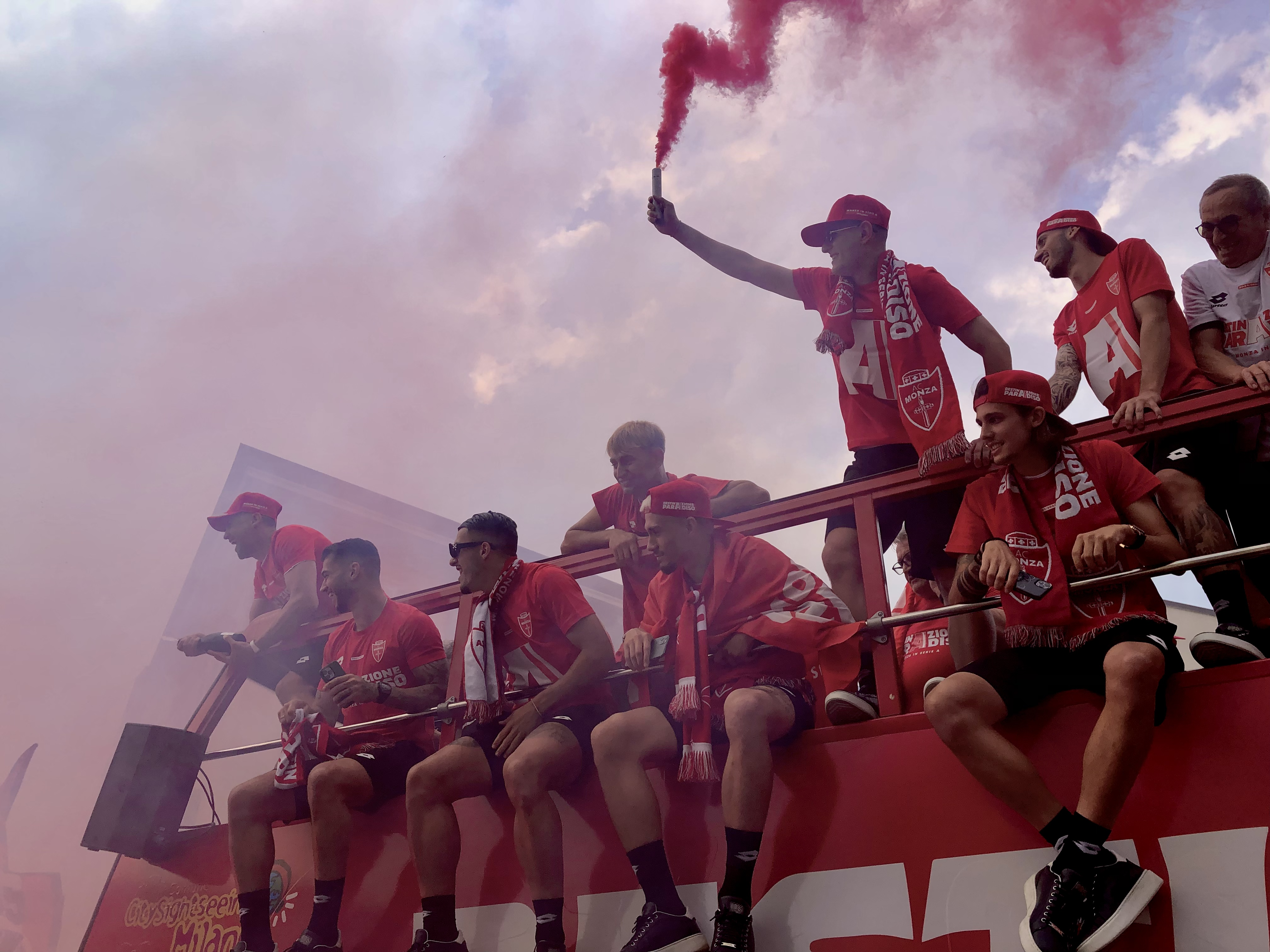
Monza players celebrating on an open top bus their first Serie A promotion in 2022

Monza began their Serie A season on 13 August 2022, with a 2–1 home defeat to Torino; Dany Mota's goal in stoppage time was Monza's first in the Italian top flight. After consecutive defeats in the opening five games, Monza earned their first point in a 1–1 draw to Lecce on 11 September. Sitting in last place with only one point in six games, Monza replaced Stroppa with under-19s head coach Raffaele Palladino. He guided them to their first historic win on 18 September, in an upset 1–0 win against giants Juventus at home thanks to a goal by Gytkjær. In their first top-flight season, Monza mathematically avoided relegation six matchdays in advance; no other team had done so on their Serie A debut. (Note: Since the 2004–05 Serie A season, when Serie A became a 20-team league.) Monza eventually finished the season in 11th place with 52 points under Palladino, the highest point tally among newly promoted teams in Europe's top five leagues, and the second-highest point tally for a Serie A debuttee in history. (Note: Only ChievoVerona totaled more points in the three-point era (since 1994–95), having finished the 2001–02 Serie A season with 54 points.)

In their second Serie A campaign, Monza again impressed under Raffaele Palladino. Despite the departure of several key players, and the death of owner Silvio Berlusconi in June 2023, the team remained competitive and briefly fought for a European spot. Though the push for eighth place fell short, Monza secured a solid 12th-place finish in the 2023–24 season, confirming their top-flight status.

However, the following season marked a sharp downturn. After Palladino's departure, the club appointed Alessandro Nesta as head coach. Monza endured a poor start, collecting just 10 points from the opening 17 matches, including a single victory. Nesta was replaced by Salvatore Bocchetti, but results failed to improve, with only one win in seven matches. The club then turned back to Nesta, though the change did not bring a turnaround. Monza's relegation was confirmed three matchdays before the end of the season after a 4–0 home defeat to Atalanta. They ended the 2024–25 season in 20th place, returning to Serie B after three consecutive seasons in the top flight. With just 18 points, Monza narrowly avoided matching Salernitana's all-time low tally of 17 points in a 20-team Serie A, (Note: In the three-point era (since 1994–95), only four teams earned fewer points than Monza in 2024–25: Brescia (12, 1994–95), Napoli (14, 1997–98), and Ancona (13, 2003–04) all in 18-team leagues; and Salernitana (17, 2023–24).) recorded the previous season.

=== American ownership and Serie A return (2025–present) ===
On 1 July 2025, Fininvest announced an agreement to sell AC Monza to the American investment firm Beckett Layne Ventures (BLV) in a deal reported at around €45 million, including the club's debts. The agreement provided for the transfer of 80% of the shares during summer 2025, with the remaining 20% to be sold by June 2026. The first closing, giving BLV control with an 80% stake, was completed on 25 September 2025.

Monza competed in the 2025–26 Serie B season under head coach Paolo Bianco. Considered among the favourites for promotion, the club remained in contention for the automatic promotion places throughout much of the campaign, but ultimately finished third after missing out on the final matchday. Monza entered the play-offs at the semi-final stage, defeating Juve Stabia 4–3 on aggregate to qualify for the final against Catanzaro. After winning the first leg 2–0 away from home, Monza lost the return leg by the same scoreline; however, they secured promotion to Serie A thanks to their higher regular-season finish, returning to the top flight after a one-year absence.

== Colours and identity ==
=== Colours ===
Upon their formation in September 1912, Monza's team wore long-sleeved, blue shirts with a white collar and cuffs. The choice of blue was "forced"; a local cloth dealer, who was a football fan, gave the newly founded club a piece of blue cloth he had not been able to sell for years. Following World War I, in the 1919–20 Promozione, the countless washes faded the shirts' colours from blue to white, and they were replaced with new, half-white and half-blue shirts with matching sleeves.

The club continued to wear the blue-and-white colours for 20 years until September 1932, when Monza changed their colours to red and white, which they have worn ever since. The change came as a result of professor Giuseppe Riva's report addressed to the comune of Monza in May 1923, in which he discovered that the city's historical colours were red and white. (Note: The comune of Monza adopted blue and white as its colours in March 1916, after mayor Ezio Riboldi had (erroneously) found that the city's first historical coat of arms was a red sun on a blue background. However, in 1923 professor Giuseppe Riva discovered that the background of the coat of arms was not blue, but white. This is confirmed by Bonincontro Morigia, a 14th-century historian from Monza, who described his city's crest as "a white flag with a red moon in the middle".) Monza debuted with their new colours in the Coppa del ventennio (Two-decades cup), a friendly tournament to mark Monza's 20-year anniversary. The kit was a white shirt with a red vertical stripe in the middle and black shorts. The team's away kit was the inverse of the home one; on occasions when Monza were to face a team also wearing red and white, they wore a blue kit. Ever since, the home kit has been red and the away kit white; prior to 1971, the home shirt was generally solid red and the away shirt white. In the 1937–38 and 1961–62 seasons, Monza's home shirt was striped red-and-white.

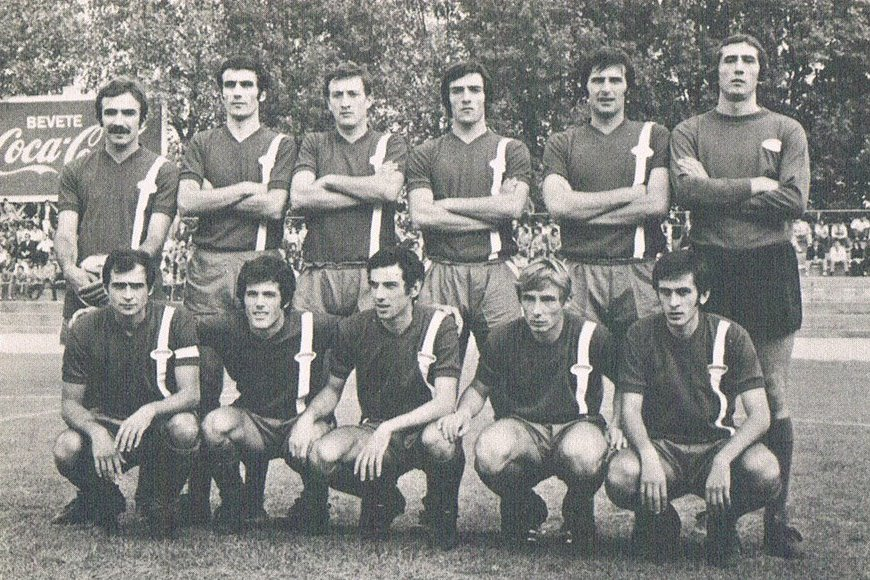
Monza's kits first featured the white vertical line in 1971; the Corona Ferrea was placed on the stripe as a logo.

During the 1950s, the shorts were usually white and rarely black. Goalkeepers wore black or grey kits. In 1971, Monza's home kit underwent a slight but significant change: a vertical white band was added on the left-hand side, running through the length of the red shirt. The band was red for the white away shirt. The following year, the vertical band extended to the shorts and the kit numbers were displayed on the sleeves. The Corona Ferrea (Iron Crown) was used as a logo at the top of the stripe on the chest. In the seasons following Monza's Coppa Italia Serie C wins in 1974, 1975, 1988 and 1991, the cockade of Italy replaced the crown. On 22 August 1979, during a 1979–80 Coppa Italia game against Milan, Monza displayed the players' names above the numbers on the back, a novelty at the time dubbed "all'Americana" (American style); the Italian Football Federation did not approve of the change and fined the club. Monza first displayed a sponsor on their shirt in 1982, showing the text "Ponteggi Dalmine".

From 1981, the lateral white stripe was removed from the kit, making way for different forms of full-red shirts; the stripe returned sporadically for short periods in 1992, 2000, 2014 and since 2018. In 2019, following the club's name change back to AC Monza, new Lotto shirts that included a small Autodromo logo on the back of the collar in reference to the Monza Circuit were unveiled. On their 110th anniversary on 1 September 2022, Monza introduced a light blue kit as their third colours for the 2022–23 season in honour of the club's first shirt.

Monza's first kit in 1912 was blue and white.
In 1920 the kit changed to blue-and-white halves.
The first red-and-white kit appeared in 1932.
In 1937–38 and 1961–62, Monza wore stripes.
Variations of a full red shirt were worn between the 1930s and 2020s...
...which alternated with the white striped kit, first introduced in 1971.

=== Badge ===
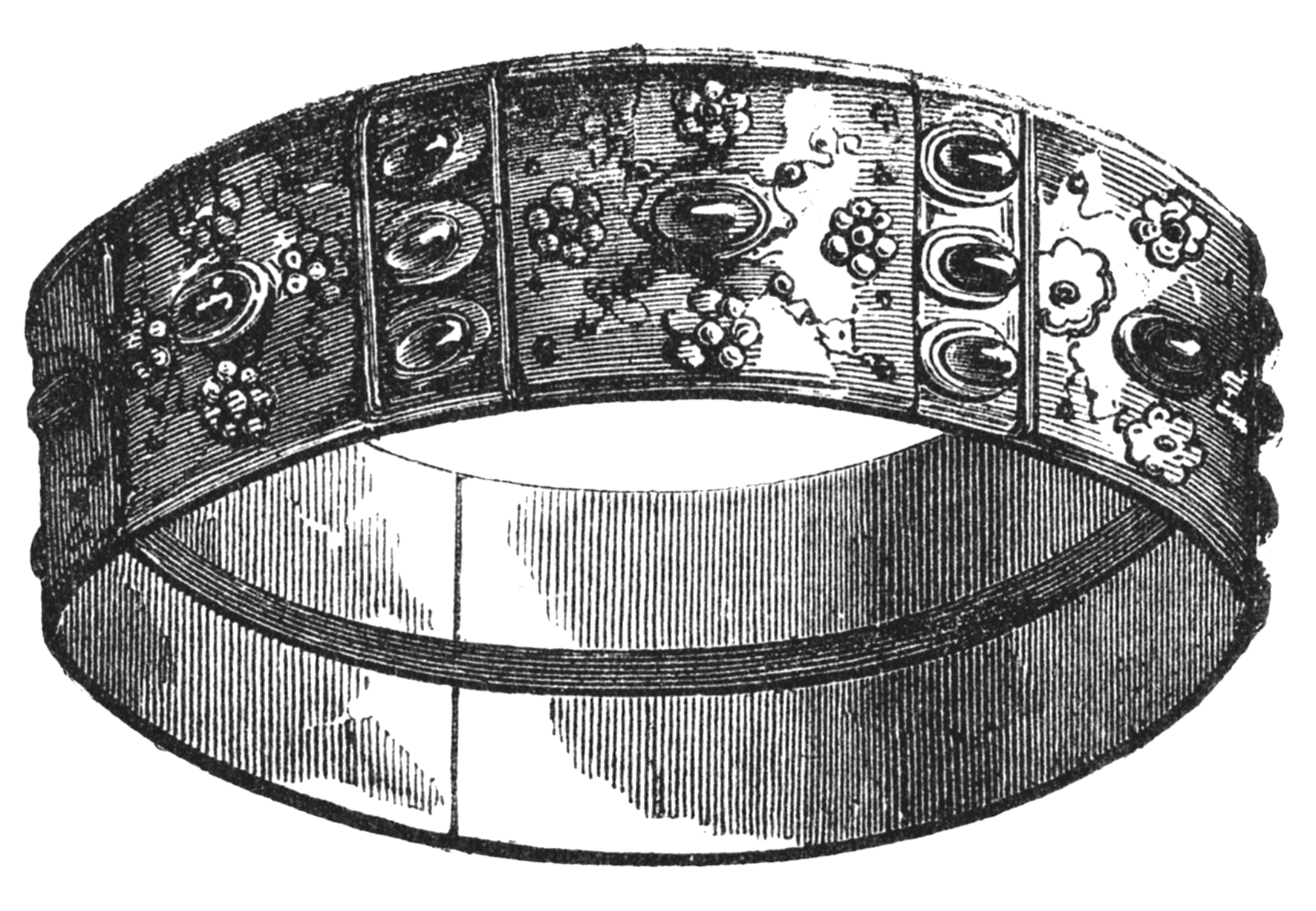
The Corona Ferrea has been used in Monza's badges since 1920.

Monza's first crest was designed in 1920: it depicted a blue shield with a red border, with a golden Corona Ferrea inside. The text "AC Monza" was written in black inside a white horizontal band above the shield. The crest remained in use until 1932, when Monza's colours changed to red and white. In 1933, the badge became circular and was vertically divided into red and white halves, and included golden initials ACM with the crown at the bottom. During the 1937–38 season, the badge's shape was changed from a circle to an oval, keeping the same details. It stayed the same until 1945, following World War II, when it changed to a rectangular shape that was divided into red and white halves. The white half on the left featured the club's name and the founding year, while the crown was placed in the red half.

Following Monza's promotion to Serie B in 1951, the crest again became oval shaped and the text's orientation was changed from vertical to horizontal. This design lasted five years until Monza's merger with Simmenthal, when the logo became more detailed; the badge was shaped like an ox head, including the horns. The colours were placed diagonally, similarly to the 1951 crest, with the letters S (for Simmenthal) and M (Monza) being placed on top of each other in the badge's centre. The crown was placed above the letters. After the end of the merger in 1966, the badge became a stylised golden Corona Ferrea with red details. The epigraph of the club's name was placed in the inner circle. In 1984, Monza's logo went back to a rectangular shape. A white inverted chevron was placed inside, with the words "Calcio" and "Monza" placed on each side of the chevron. A vertical sword, a reference to Estorre Visconti, was placed inside the downward-pointing triangle formed by the chevron. The crown formed the hilt of the sword.

The badge used by Monza between 2004 and 2013

In 2000, the logo changed to a rounded-bottom shield; a red crown was placed in the top third on a white background, while the bottom two-thirds contained the words "Calcio Monza 1912" written in white on a red background. The logo remained until 2004, when a new crest was introduced: it was a more rounded red shield with white details; "AC Monza Brianza" was written on top, and a depiction of a sword "cutting through" a crown – both drawn in a minimalist style – was placed on the bottom. Monza celebrated their 100th anniversary in the 2012–13 season. A modified version of the logo was announced to mark the occasion: a gold crown with red and white gems was placed above the crest. "MB" (standing for Monza Brianza) written in red was placed below the crest, surrounded by "2012" to the left, "1912" to the right and "100" on the bottom, all written in gold.

Starting from the 2013–14 season, Monza's logo included a red shield with the club's name ("AC Monza Brianza") in white capital letters inside. The Corona Ferrea was placed above the shield and two white "Visconti" crossed swords were included inside the shield. The logo underwent a minor redesign in 2015, when the two crossed swords were replaced with a vertical sword, and the text on top changed to "SSD Monza", to reflect the club's name change. In 2016 and 2019, the text in the badge was changed to "Monza" and "AC Monza", respectively. In 2021, a thin red outline was added to the logo, enclosing the already present white border surrounding the red shield. The same year, Monza published a brand manual, including information about the geometrical construction of the badge, the fonts used by the club, and their colour dubbed "Rosso Monza" (Monza Red; hex: #E4032E).

=== Anthem ===
Since 2006, the club's official anthem has been the song "Monza Alè", which was written and composed by the band Amusia, whose leader was former Monza player Michele Magrin.

== Stadiums ==
=== First grounds ===
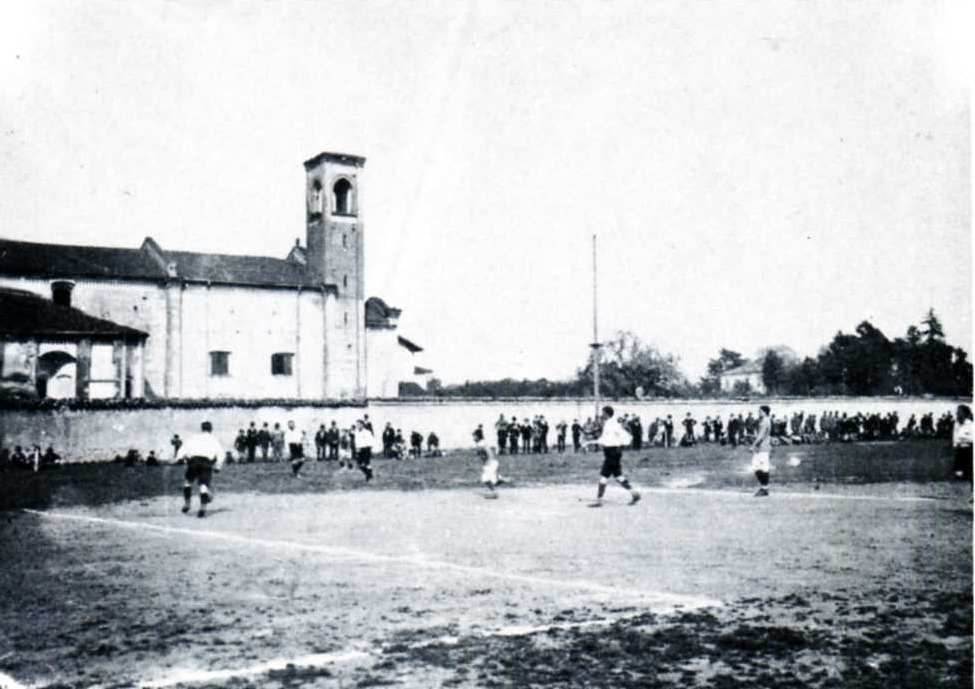
The Grazie Vecchie field during a game between Monza and Czechoslovakia in 1919

Pro Monza and Pro Italia, the clubs that merged to form Monza in 1912, played in the Boschetti Reali in front of the Royal Villa of Monza. After the merger, Monza first played in the district of Triante; the field was called "fuori porta" (outside the door) because it was located outside the city of Monza. Small stands were built for a cost of ITL3,000 (€14,000 as of 2025 (Note: Historical conversion from Italian lira to Euro according to the Italian National Institute of Statistics online calculator. Euro figures refer to May 2025.)). The opening match at the field was played between Milan and Chiasso on 13 May 1912, which ended in a 5–2 win for Milan.

Monza's first city-based stadium was the Grazie Vecchie, which was inaugurated on 13 May 1915 with a 1–0 win over Juventus Italia. The stadium also played host to a friendly match between Monza and the Czechoslovakia military national team in 1919, which ended in a 1–1 draw.

In late 1923, Monza relocated to their newly constructed stadium in Via Ghilini (Ghilini Street), which cost almost ITL70,000 (€80,000). The stadium was inaugurated in early 1924 with a friendly against Gloria from the city of Fiume, following the city's recent annexation to Italy, (Note: Fiume (today known as Rijeka) was part of Italy between 1924 and 1945, when it became part of Yugoslavia. Following the breakup of Yugoslavia, Rijeka has been part of Croatia since 1991. The club became NK Rijeka in 1954, and has been known as HNK Rijeka since 1995.) which Monza won 2–1. The Via Ghilini field continued operating until 1939 when World War II made it impractical.

=== Stadio Gino Alfonso Sada ===
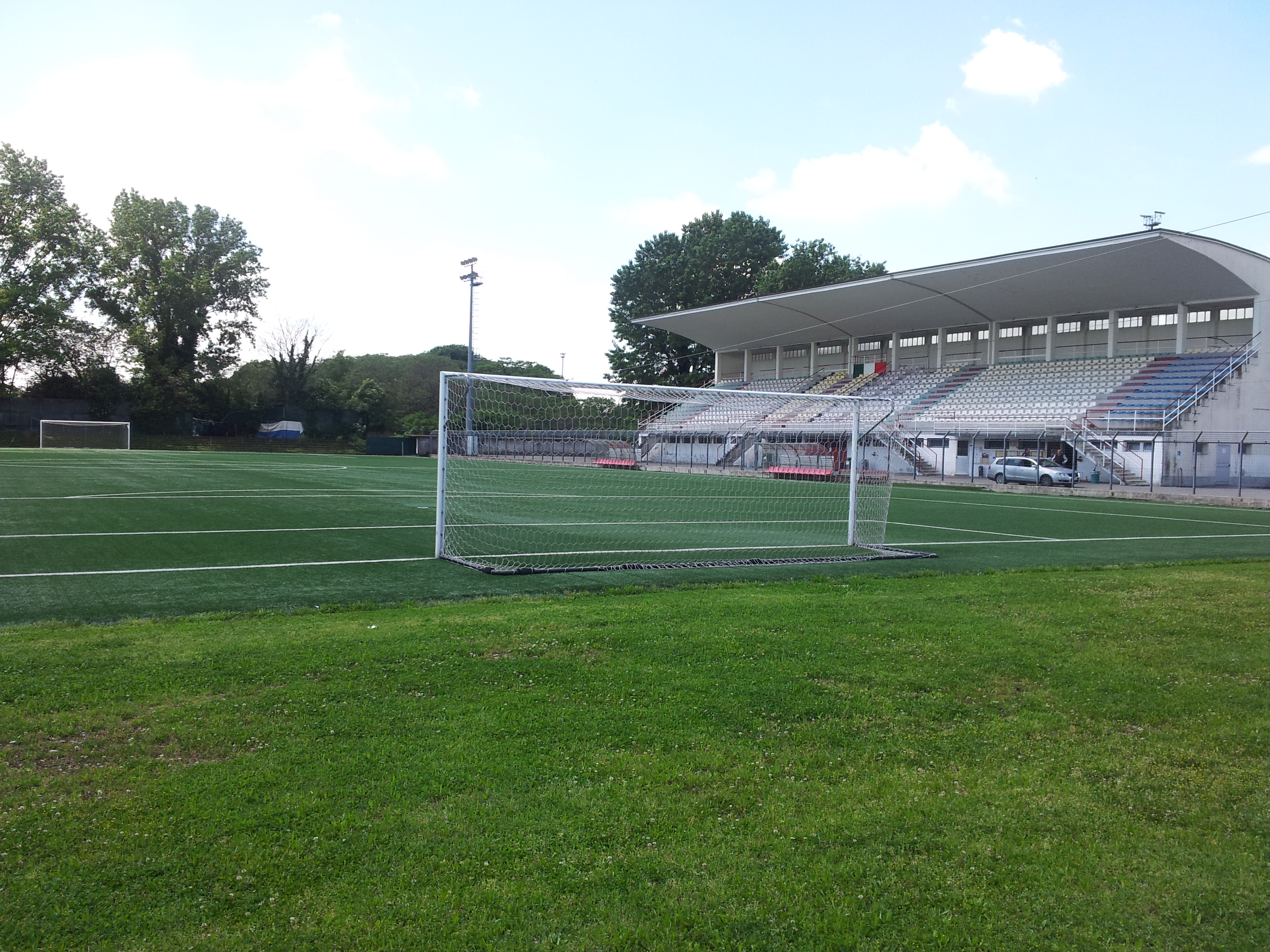
The Stadio Gino Alfonso Sada (2013) hosted Monza's games between 1945 and 1988.

In 1945, following the war, a new playing field was built on the parade ground of the former Gioventù Italiana del Littorio (GIL), and was called the San Gregorio field. It was inaugurated on 21 October with Monza's 2–0 friendly win over Pavia. Following Monza's promotion to Serie B in 1951, a grandstand and stands were built, and the stadium was renamed Stadio Città di Monza; the supporters, however, continued using its traditional name.

In 1965, the stadium was renamed Stadio Gino Alfonso Sada in honour of the deceased former president of Monza. The club's last match at the "Sada" was played on 11 June 1988; it was the away match of the 1987–88 Coppa Italia Serie C final against Palermo, which Monza won 2–1.

=== Stadio Brianteo ===
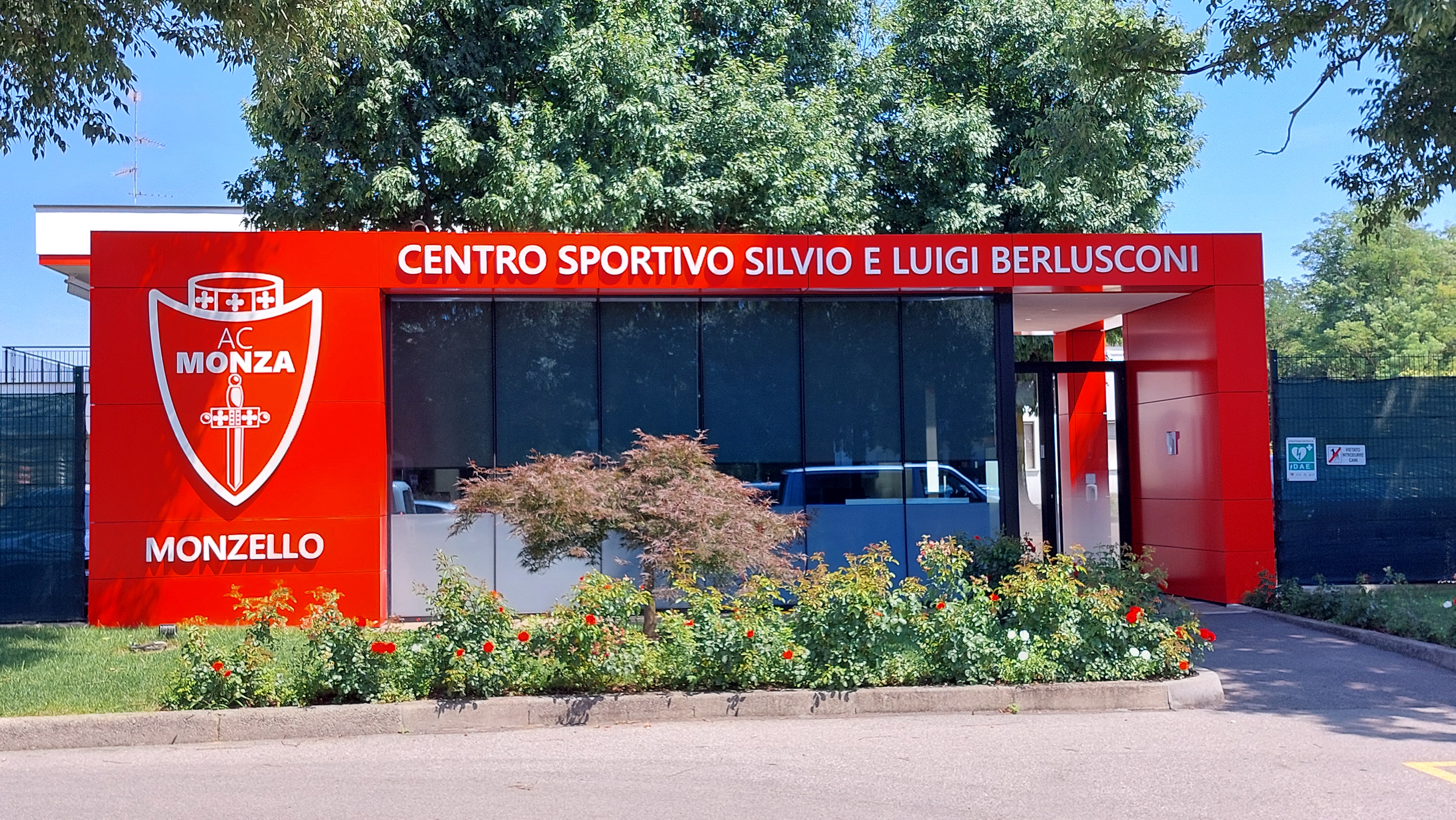
Centro sportivo Silvio e Luigi Berlusconi – Monzello in 2024

On 28 May 1979, plans for the construction of a new stadium, which were approved by the Extraordinary Commissioner Alfio Licandro, began. Construction of the new Stadio Brianteo began on 13 November 1982 and ended in 1986. In the initial project, the stadium's capacity was expected to be around 30,000; for security reasons, however, the capacity was lowered to just under 20,000. Monza played their first game at the "Brianteo" on 28 August 1988, when they hosted Serie A side Roma in the Coppa Italia; Monza won their first match in their new stadium 2–1.

On 4 September 2020, the stadium was renamed U-Power Stadium, following a sponsorship deal with footwear and workwear company U-Power. Monza re-opened the east stand – which had been closed for 20 years – ahead of the 2022–23 Serie A season, bringing the maximum seating capacity from 10,000 to about 17,000.

Monza inaugurated their training ground, Centro Sportivo Monzello, on 3 November 1986. It was renamed "Centro sportivo Silvio e Luigi Berlusconi – Monzello" on 12 June 2024, in honour of owner Silvio Berlusconi and honorary president Paolo Berlusconi's late father.

== Supporters ==
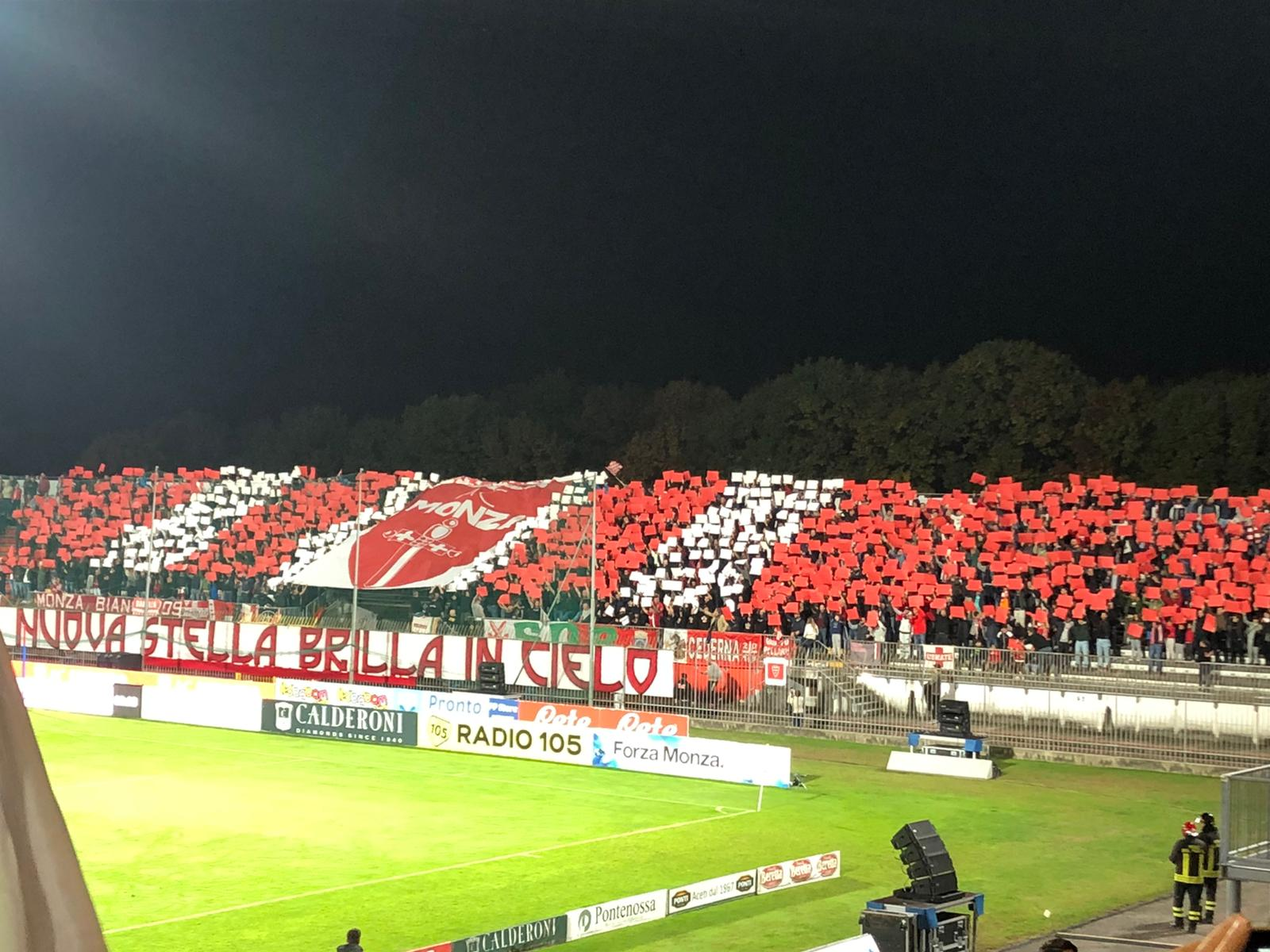
A tifo by Curva Sud fans in a match against Renate in 2019

The first signs of organised support emerged in the early-1970s with the founding of the ultras groups Commandos in 1971 and Club Ultras Monza in 1972. Eagles Monza emerged in the early 1980s. After Monza's move to the new Stadio Brianteo in 1988, several ultras groups began to fold; Eagles was abandoned in 1992. In 1993, Gioventù Brianzola was formed, and became the driving force of the Curva Sud; the group adopted the eagle as their symbol as a tribute to the defunct group. In 1994, Sempre Al Bar (S.A.B.) was formed. With the dissolution of other groups in 2001, S.A.B. became the main group of the curva.

Following Berlusconi's takeover of the club in 2018, attendance figures started to rise and new supporter groups began to emerge. On 31 March 2022, Monza formed the AC Monza Club, a project that is aimed at uniting official Monza fan clubs by organising meetings, rallies and sporting events.

The Curva Sud of the Brianteo is also called "Curva Davide Pieri" in memory of a young fan who died in 1998. The press stand – part of the west stand – was named in memory of Claudio Parma, a journalist and biancorosso fan who died in 2008, while the entire west stand bears the name of the historic fan Angelo Scotti, who died in 2018.

== Rivalries ==
Monza fans singing "chi non salta è un pisano" (whoever is not jumping is from Pisa), following their Serie B play-off win against Pisa in 2022

Monza's main rivalry is with fellow Lombardy club Como; it has been defined as the "hottest derby in Serie B". The two clubs first played each other in Como on 19 November 1922, with the match ending in a goalless draw. The rivalry began on 4 June 1967, when Monza beat Como 1–0 in the decisive Serie B promotion play-off. It became more intense on 13 April 1980; with Monza leading 3–1, Como equalised in the last minute with a penalty. The 3–3 draw ended Monza's chances of promotion to Serie A.

Another important rivalry is the one with Pro Sesto, which is based in the adjacent city Sesto San Giovanni. Historically, the two sides have had a tradition of beating the other away from home. Monza also have a more recent rivalry with Pisa; in 2007, the two sides played in the Serie C promotion play-off final. Pisa won in extra time, and opposing supporters began attacking each other. In 2022, the two sides met once again in a decisive promotion play-off final, this time for Serie A: Monza won in extra time, and reached the first division for the first time in their history.

== In the media ==
During the 1955–56 Serie B, Monza's first season after their merger with Simmenthal, Monza's San Gregorio stadium hosted the first free-to-air televised football match in Italy. The match was broadcast by RAI and commentated upon by Nicolò Carosio, and was played on 8 October 1955 between Monza and Verona. The match ended in a goalless draw. Monza earned ITL700,000 (€13,000) from the broadcast. Only 1,500 spectators attended the game because most fans were watching it on television in local bars.

Italian actor Renato Pozzetto, in the 1979 film The Finzi Detective Agency, played a private investigator Riccardo Finzi, a supporter of Monza who said: "Io sono del Monza, non riusciremo mai a venire in Serie A" (I support Monza, we will never be able to reach Serie A). The line became a part of local culture and was used in a fan chant: "Il nostro Calcio Monza è in C1, e non andremo mai in Serie A. Ma io non mollerò, questa è la mia mentalità. Segui anche tu la squadra della tua città" (Our Calcio Monza is in [Serie] C1, and we will never make it to Serie A. But I will not give up, this is my mentality. You should follow your hometown team too).

=== Esports ===
In September 2019, Monza launched their esports team to compete in FIFA games. They reached the 2021 FIFA eClub World Cup Europe semi-finals and were ranked 12th in the overall rankings. In January 2022, Monza were awarded the "OIES Badge" by the Osservatorio Italiano Esports.

== Players ==
=== First-team squad ===
As of 1 September 2026

Note: Flags indicate national team as defined under FIFA eligibility rules; some limited exceptions apply. Players may hold more than one non-FIFA nationality.

No.	Pos.	Nation	Player
1	GK	SWE	Noel Törnqvist (on loan from Como)
2	DF	GEO	Saba Goglichidze (on loan from Udinese)
3	DF	ITA	Lorenzo Lucchesi
4	DF	POL	Jan Ziółkowski (on loan from Roma)
5	DF	FRA	Yvan Maye (on loan from Inter Milan)
6	DF	BUL	Valentin Antov
7	DF	POR	Ricardo Mangas (on loan from Sporting CP)
8	MF	FRA	Manga Foe Ondoa
9	FW	POR	Gustavo Varela
10	FW	ITA	Patrick Cutrone
11	MF	ENG	Omari Forson
14	MF	NGR	Ebenezer Akinsanmiro (on loan from Inter Milan)
16	FW	BEL	Cyril Ngonge (on loan from Napoli)
17	FW	SEN	Keita Baldé
19	DF	ITA	Samuele Birindelli
20	GK	SEN	Demba Thiam

No.	Pos.	Nation	Player
21	MF	ITA	Leonardo Colombo
22	FW	ARG	Exequiel Zeballos
24	DF	MAR	Adam Bakoune
26	FW	ITA	Patrick Ciurria
27	MF	GER	Idrissa Touré
28	FW	ITA	Andrea Colpani
32	MF	ITA	Matteo Pessina (captain)
43	GK	SLO	Aljaž Strajnar
44	DF	ITA	Andrea Carboni
46	MF	ENG	Jay Robinson (on loan from Southampton)
47	FW	POR	Dany Mota
60	DF	ITA	Eddy Kouadio (on loan from Fiorentina)
70	FW	ITA	Kevin Martins
80	MF	ITA	Mathis Mout
90	MF	ITA	Michael Folorunsho (on loan from Napoli)

=== Youth Sector ===
As of 22 August 2026

Note: Flags indicate national team as defined under FIFA eligibility rules; some limited exceptions apply. Players may hold more than one non-FIFA nationality.

No.	Pos.	Nation	Player
50	GK	ITA	Aleksandr Ballabio

=== Out on loan ===
As of 1 September 2026

Note: Flags indicate national team as defined under FIFA eligibility rules; some limited exceptions apply. Players may hold more than one non-FIFA nationality.

No.	Pos.	Nation	Player
—	GK	ITA	Semuel Pizzignacco (on loan to Carrarese until 30 June 2027)
—	GK	ITA	Andrea Vailati (on loan to Audace Cerignola until 30 June 2027)
—	DF	ITA	Samuele Capolupo (on loan to Spezia until 30 June 2027)
—	DF	ITA	Filippo Delli Carri (on loan to Sampdoria until 30 June 2027)

No.	Pos.	Nation	Player
—	MF	ITA	Alessandro Berretta (on loan to Pergolettese until 30 June 2027)
—	MF	ITA	Nicolas Galazzi (on loan to Padova until 30 June 2027)
—	FW	FRA	Solomon Loubao (on loan to Catanzaro until 30 June 2027)

== Club officials ==
=== Management ===
Position	Staff
President	(United States) Lauren Crampsie
CEO	(Italy) Mauro Baldissoni
Technical director	(Italy) Francesco Vallone
Sporting director	(Equatorial Guinea) Pedro Obiang
Head of youth academy	(Italy) Mauro Fattori
Chief operating officer	(Italy) Daniela Gozzi
Chief sales officer	(Italy) Fabio Guido Aureli
Chief communication officer	(Italy) Daria Nicoli
Press officer	(Italy) Enrico Cerruti
Team manager	(Italy) Carmine Russo
Chief marketing officer	(Italy) Francesco Bevilacqua
Supporter liaison officer	(Italy) Marco Ravasi

Last updated: 20 August 2026

=== Technical staff ===
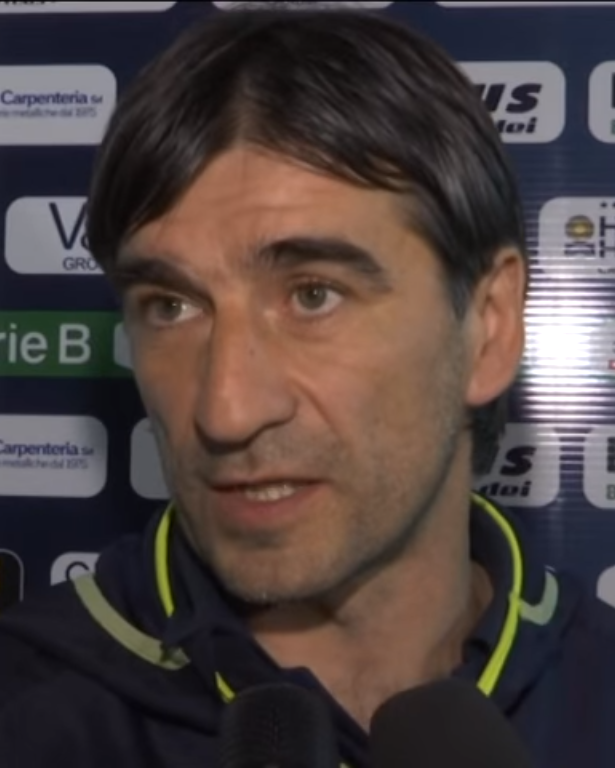
Ivan Jurić (2016) was appointed head coach of Monza in 2026.

Position	Staff
Head coach	(Croatia) Ivan Jurić
Assistant coach	(Italy) Matteo Paro
Technical assistant	(Croatia) Stjepan Ostojic (Italy) Pedro Cavalcanti (Italy) Riccardo Terrinoni
Goalkeepers' coach	(Italy) Valerio Fiori
Goalkeepers' technical assistant	(Italy) Gian Mario Petrelli
Athletic trainer	(Italy) Paolo Barbero
Athletic trainer's technical assistant	(Italy) Marco Vago (Italy) Gianni Bulgarini (Italy) Giovanni Scampini (Italy) Agostino Crocco
Match analyst	(Italy) Carlo Francesco Rimoldi (Italy) Michele Orecchio
Team doctor	(Italy) Chiara Airoldi
Club doctor	(Italy) Attilio Cosentini (Italy) Vincenzo Costa
Healthcare professional	(Italy) Dario Lorenzo Dameno (Italy) Luca Casella (Italy) Andrea Magini

Last updated: 8 July 2026

== Managerial history ==
The following is a list of Monza managers throughout history.

- Technical committee (1912–1927)
- (Italy) Cesare Lovati (1928–1929)
- (Italy) Ettore Reynaudi (1929–1930)
- Technical committee (1930–1935)
- (Italy) Leopoldo Conti (1935–1936)
- (Italy) Silvio Stritzel (1936–1937)
- (Italy) Angelo Albertoni (1937–1938)
- (Italy) Leopoldo Conti (1938–1939)
- (Italy) Alessandro Scarioni (1939–1940)
- (Italy) Angelo Piffarerio (1940–1942)
- (Italy) Mario Antonioli (1942–1943)
- (Italy) Angelo Piffarerio (1945–1947)
- (Italy) Luigi Bonizzoni (1947–1948)
- (Italy) Oreste Barale (1948–1949)
- (Italy) Annibale Frossi (1949–1953)
- (Italy) Fioravante Baldi (1953–1954)
- (Italy) Carlo Alberto Quario (1954–1955)
- (Italy) Pietro Rava (1955–1956)
- (Italy) Eraldo Monzeglio (1956)
- (Italy) Bruno Arcari (1956–1958)
- (Italy) Pietro Rava (1958–1959)
- (Italy) Manlio Cipolla (1959)
- (Italy) Attilio Kossovel (1959–1960)
- (Argentina) Hugo Lamanna (1960–1964)
- (Italy) Vittorio Malagoli (1964–1965)
- (Italy) Vincenzo Rigamonti (1965–1966)
- (Italy) Bruno Dazzi (1966)
- (Italy) Luigi Radice (1966–1968)
- (Italy) Bruno Dazzi (1968)
- (Sweden) Nils Liedholm (1968–1969)
- (Italy) Luigi Radice (1969–1971)
- (Italy) Franco Viviani (1971–1973)
- (Italy) Gino Pivatelli (1973)
- (Italy) Mario David (1973–1975)
- (Italy) Alfredo Magni (1975–1980)
- (Italy) Sergio Carpanesi (1980)
- (Italy) Lamberto Giorgis (1980–1981)
- (Italy) Franco Fontana (1981–1982)
- (Italy) Guido Mazzetti (1982–1983)
- (Italy) Alfredo Magni (1983–1986)
- (Italy) Paolo Carosi (1986)
- (Italy) Antonio Pasinato (1986–1987)
- (Italy) Pierluigi Frosio (1987–1990)
- (Italy) Franco Varrella (1990–1991)
- (Italy) Giovanni Trainini (1991–1993)
- (Italy) Nedo Sonetti (1993–1994)
- (Italy) Simone Boldini (1994–1996)
- (Italy) Giorgio Rumignani (1996–1997)
- (Italy) Luigi Radice (1997)
- (Italy) Bruno Bolchi (1997–1998)
- (Italy) Pierluigi Frosio (1998–2000)
- (Italy) Roberto Antonelli (2000–2001)
- (Italy) Gaetano Salvemini (2001)
- (Italy) Simone Boldini (2001)
- (Italy) Romano Cazzaniga (2001)
- (Italy) Roberto Antonelli (2001–2002)
- (Italy) Romano Cazzaniga (2002)
- (Italy) Simone Boldini (2002)
- (Italy) Oscar Piantoni (2002–2003)
- (Italy) Massimo Pedrazzini (2003–2004)
- (Italy) Giovanni Trainini (2004–2005)
- (Italy) Antonio Sala (2005)
- (Italy) Giuliano Sonzogni (2005–2007)
- (Italy) Giovanni Pagliari (2007–2008)
- (Italy) Dario Marcolin (2008)
- (Italy) Giuliano Sonzogni (2008–2009)
- (Italy) Roberto Cevoli (2009–2010)
- (Italy) Alessio De Petrillo (2010)
- (Italy) Corrado Verdelli (2010–2011)
- (Italy) Gianfranco Motta (2011–2012)
- (Italy) Antonino Asta (2012–2014)
- (Italy) Fulvio Pea (2014–2015)
- (Italy) Alessio Delpiano (2015–2016)
- (Italy) Sandro Salvioni (2016)
- (Italy) Alessio Delpiano (2016)
- (Italy) Marco Zaffaroni (2016–2018)
- (Italy) Cristian Brocchi (2018–2021)
- (Italy) Giovanni Stroppa (2021–2022)
- (Italy) Raffaele Palladino (2022–2024)
- (Italy) Alessandro Nesta (2024)
- (Italy) Salvatore Bocchetti (2024–2025)
- (Italy) Alessandro Nesta (2025)
- (Italy) Paolo Bianco (2025–2026)
- (Croatia) Ivan Jurić (2026–present)

== Hall of Fame ==
The following is a list of players and head coaches who are part of the Hall of Fame on the club's official website. All entries are players unless noted otherwise.

- (Italy) Francesco Antonioli (1986–1988)
- (Italy) Evaristo Beccalossi (1985–1986)
- (Italy) Ariedo Braida (Note: Player and sporting director) (1975–1977)
- (Italy) Marco Branca (2000–2001)
- (Italy) Ruben Buriani (1974–1977)
- (Italy) Pierluigi Casiraghi (Note: Player and youth head coach) (1985–1989)
- (Italy) Luciano Castellini (1965–1970)
- (Italy) Alessandro Costacurta (1986–1987)
- (Italy) Walter De Vecchi (1975–1978)
- (Italy) Luigi Di Biagio (1989–1992)
- (France) Patrice Evra (1999–2000)
- (Italy) Maurizio Ganz (1988–1989)
- (Belgium) Jean-François Gillet (1999–2000)
- (Sweden) Nils Liedholm (Note: Head coach) (1968–1969)
- (Italy) Daniele Massaro (1978–1981)
- (Italy) Paolo Monelli (1978–1981)
- (Italy) Emiliano Mondonico (1970–1971)
- (Italy) Giulio Nuciari (1988–1989)
- (Italy) Davide Pinato (1983–1988)
- (Italy) Felice Pulici (1977–1978)
- (Italy) Luigi Radice (1969–1970)
- (Italy) Anselmo Robbiati (1987–1993, 2004–2005)
- (Italy) Fulvio Saini (1980–1998)
- (Italy) Claudio Sala (1965–1967)
- (Italy) Patrizio Sala (1973–1975)
- (Italy) Giovanni Stroppa (Note: Player and head coach) (1987–1989)
- (Italy) Giuliano Terraneo (1974–1977)
- (Italy) Marco Zaffaroni (2004–2008)

== Honours ==
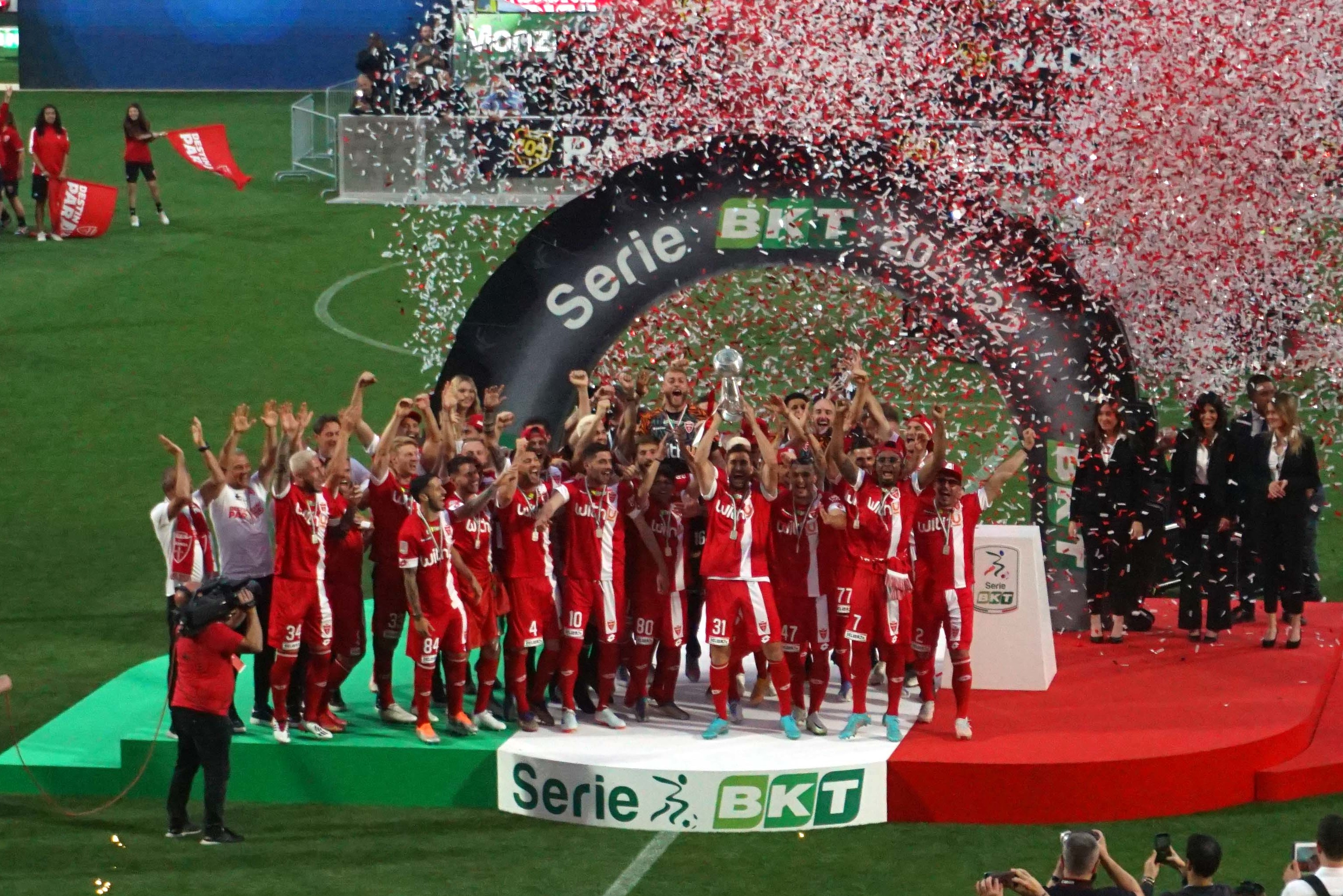
Monza players celebrating their first Serie A promotion in 2022, after winning the Serie B promotion play-offs

The following is a list of honours and achievements Monza have attained throughout their history.

=== League ===
- Serie C (Level 3)
  - Winners (4): 1950–51 (Group A), 1966–67 (Group A), 1975–76 (Group A), 2019–20 (Group A)
- Seconda Divisione (Level 3)
  - Winners (1): 1926–27
- Serie D (Level 4)
  - Winners (1): 2016–17 (Group B)
- Scudetto Serie D (Level 4)
  - Winners (1): 2016–17

=== Cup ===
- Coppa Italia Serie C
  - Winners (4; record): 1973–74, (Note: Coppa Italia Semiprofessionisti) 1974–75, 1987–88, 1990–91

=== International ===
- Anglo-Italian Cup
  - Winners (1): 1976

=== Other achievements ===
- Serie B (Level 2)
  - Play-off winners (2): 2021–22, 2025–26
- Serie C (Level 3)
  - Runners-up (5): 1947–48 (Group F), 1974–75 (Group A), 1981–82 (Group A), (Note: Serie C1) 1987–88 (Group A), 1991–92 (Group A)
  - Play-off winners (1): 1996–97 (Group A)
- Prima Divisione Lombardia (Level 4)
  - Runners-up (1): 1941–42 (Group C)
- Coppa Italia Serie C
  - Runners-up (4): 1975–76, 1995–96, 2013–14, 2018–19
- Anglo-Italian Semiprofessional Cup
  - Runners-up (1): 1975
