= Fulvio Saini =

Italian footballer

Personal information
- Full name: Fulvio Luigi Saini
- Date of birth: 7 March 1962 (age 64)
- Place of birth: Biassono, Italy
- Height: 1.74 m (5 ft 9 in)
- Position: Midfielder

Youth career
- 1977–1980: Monza

Senior career*
Years	Team	Apps	(Gls)
1980–1998	Monza	544	(13)
1998–2001	Pro Sesto	92	(1)
- * Club domestic league appearances and goals as of 25 August 2011

Fulvio Luigi Saini (born 7 March 1962) is an Italian former professional footballer who played as a midfielder for Italian club Monza (then in Serie B and Serie C)

== Playing career ==
He began his career in the youth team of Monza, the team that launched him into professionalism and of which he became captain. The player from Brianza lived for almost twenty years with the red and white shirt, collecting 544 appearances in the championship (290 of which in Serie B and 254 in Serie C1), a record for the Monza club, topped off with 13 goals, the victory of two Italian Serie C Cups and three promotions to Serie B.

He closed his career playing 3 seasons in Serie C2 in Pro Sesto, with 92 games and one goal.

== Coaching career ==
After completing his experience as a footballer, he coached the Monza youth team for many years. In June 2017, exactly 40 years after he joined the Monza youth team as a footballer, he left his position as coach.

== Honours ==
Monza

- Serie C1: 1987-88
- Coppa Italia Serie C: 1987–88
- Coppa Italia Serie C: 1990–91
