= 1926–27 Seconda Divisione =

Seconda Divisione
- Season: 1926–27
- Champions: Monza
- Promoted: Ponziana; Carrarese; Ternana
- Relegated: AC Gonzaga; US Copparese; Pordenone (bankruptcy); Others
- Matches: 446

The 1926–27 Seconda Divisione was the first edition of a sub-national third level tournament within the Italian football championship.

In 1926 the ”Viareggio Charter” submitted the Italian football's organization to the fascist regime. The 60 best clubs of the country joined the two new national championships, while the third level became the Seconda Divisione on sub-national bases. Clubs leagues were disbanded and substituted by some Authorities appointed by the fascists.

== Regulations ==
The ”Northern Lower Divisions Directory”, which had its headquarters in Genoa, created a copy of the higher championship, the Prima Divisione. It was composed of three groups of ten clubs, a total of 30 teams. The winners of any group of the Northern Authority were promoted, while the last two teams should be relegated. A final for the title was planned.

The ”Southern Lower Divisions Directory”, which had its headquarters in Rome, organized its 28 teams into four groups. The winners of any group of Southern Authority qualified to the final group. The winner of the final group was promoted.

However, following numerous bankruptcies that involved every southern team in Prima Divisione except the Puglia's teams, were later promoted in Prima Divisione also Savoia and Tivoli. The other teams of the Second Division Southern League refused to be admitted in Prima Divisione.

== Teams selection ==
The old Northern Terza Divisione third-level championship had a regional structure with inter-regional finals, so it was decided to take the best clubs of these finals with the clubs eliminated from the disbanded Northern League.

In Southern Italy the situation was different. There, the previous reform of 1921-1922 did not take place, so the pyramid of 1912 had been maintained, with the Seconda Divisione, former Seconda Categoria, as the first tournament at the regional level. So, in a lexical continuity, the old Seconda Divisione remained the bulk of new one, including six promoted teams and the clubs eliminated from the disbanded Southern League, but with the difference of the elimination of the regional boundaries to adopt the inter-regional structure as the Northern counterpart.

30 Northern clubs	30 Southern clubs
18 worst clubs of the Northern League's Second Division	6 worst clubs of the Southern League's First Divisione
12 top clubs of Northern Italy Third Division	all 18 clubs of Southern Italy Second Division
12 top clubs of Northern Italy Third Division	6 top clubs from Southern Italy Third Division

== Northern Authority ==
=== Group A ===
	Group A	Pt
1.	Carrarese	25
2.	Valenzana	22
3.	Corniglianese	21
4.	Viareggio	19
5.	Vado	18
6.	Rapallo Ruentes	18
7.	Rivarolese	16
8.	Signa	15
9.	La Nicese	13
10.	Genovese	13

- Carrarese promoted to Prima Divisione.
- Valenzana admitted to Prima Divisione to fill a vacancy.
- La Nicese and Genovese re-admitted to fill a vacancy.

=== Group B ===
	Group B	Pt
1.	Monza	25
2.	Lecco	24
3.	Codogno	23
4.	Crema	22
5.	Piacenza	19
6.	Fanfulla	18
7.	Juventus Italia	15
8.	Trevigliese	12
9.	Abbiategrasso	12
10.	Gonzaga	9

Relegation playoff

	Result		Venue
Trevigliese	4 - 1	Abbiategrasso	Milan, May 8, 1927

- Monza promoted to Prima Divisione.
- Lecco admitted to Prima Divisione to fill a vacancy.
- Abbiategrasso re-admitted to fill a vacancy.
- Gonzaga relegated to Terza Divisione.

=== Group C ===
	Group C	Pt
1.	Ponziana	30
2.	Edera Trieste	27
3.	Vicenza	22
4.	Petrarca Padova	19
5.	Faenza	19
6.	Pro Gorizia	18
7.	Fiumana	15
8.	Pordenone	15
9.	Dolo	14
10.	Copparese	1

- Ponziana promoted to Prima Divisione.
- Pordenone disbanded after the end of the season.
- Dolo re-admitted to fill a vacancy.
- Copparese relegated to Terza Divisione.

== Southern Authority ==
=== Group A ===
	Adriatic	Pt
1.	Tiferno	17
2.	Pippo Massangioli	12
3.	Rosburghese	11
4.	Zara	9
5.	Stamura	9
6.	Tito Acerbo	0
7.	Perugia	no

- Tiferno qualified to the Southern finals.
- Zara could not pay another season.
- Stamura merged with stronger AC Ancona.
- Tito Acerbo disbanded for bribery.
- Perugia did not play this season, but they were re-admitted anyway.

=== Group B ===
	Roman zone	Pt
1.	Terni	19
2.	US Romana	16
3.	Ardita RM	13
4.	Vittoria RM	10
5.	Civitavecchia	9
5.	Juventus RM	9
7.	Tivoli	8
8.	Virtus Goliarda	no

- Terni qualified to the Southern finals.
- Tivoli firstly re-admitted, then resulting the sole club to apply for, they were admitted to Prima Divisione.
- V.Goliarda did not play this season, but they were re-admitted anyway.

=== Group C ===
	Campania	Pt
1.	Savoia	23
2.	Maddalonese	15
2.	Stabiese	15
4.	Scafatese	11
5.	Aversana	9
5.	Campania	9
7.	Cavese	3
8.	Puteolana	no

- Savoia qualified to the Southern finals.
- Maddalonese disbanded at the end of the season.
- Cavese disbanded for bankruptcy.
- Puteolana no more existed.

=== Group D ===
	Sicilia and Calabria	Pt
1.	Messinese	19
2.	Gargallo	17
3.	Umberto I	11
3.	Littorio Stadium	11
5.	Peloro	9
6.	Vigor PA	7
7.	Reggio	6

- Messinese qualified to the Southern finals.
- Reggio entered into a year-time break.

=== Southern Finals ===
	Final Group	Pt
1.	Terni	9
2.	Savoia	9
3.	Messinese	4
4.	Tiferno	2

Promotion playoff in Rome on July 17:TERNANA-Savoia 1–0

- Terni promoted to Prima Divisione.
- Savoia later promoted by the FIGC.

== Championship Cup ==
The group winners of Northern Italy played for the national title, because they were considered evidently stronger than the Southern clubs by the FIGC. However, Carrarese retired from this cup.

	Results		Venue
Monza	5-1	Ponziana	Monza, June 26, 1927
Ponziana	2-1	Monza	Trieste, July 3, 1927
Ponziana	2-3 (a.e.t.)	Monza	Trieste, July 10, 1927

- Monza Champions of Second Division 1927.
