= 1925–26 Lega Sud =

Lega Sud
- Season: 1925–26
- Champions: Alba Rome

The Southern League was the amatorial football championship in Southern Italy during the 20's of the 20th century.

The 1925–26 season was organized within the Italian Football Federation. The winner had the honor to play against the Northern Champions.

The League maintained the goal to improve the quality of the game in the area. However, the League’s plan to abolish the regional tournaments was boycotted by the Roman and Apulia teams. After a year of different protests, the League collapsed under its internal tensions, and it was disbanded by the fascists which promoted three clubs to the new Divisione Nazionale white the other teams were forced into a new inter-regional championship.

== Qualifications ==
=== Marche ===
==== Championship playoff ====
Team 1	Agg.	Team 2	1st leg	2nd leg
Anconitana	● 4 points against 0 ●	Maceratese	2-1	7-2

Anconitana was declared Marche's champion. Both teams were admitted to the Southern League semifinals.

=== Lazio ===
==== Pre-League qualifications ====
Team 1	Agg.	Team 2	1st leg	2nd leg
Audace Roma	● 2 points each ●	Roman	4-1	1-2

Because of the sole points were considered by the championship regulations, with no relevance to the aggregation of goals, a tie-break was needed.

Tie-break
Played on July 5, 1925, in Rome, Stadio Flaminio.

Team 1	Score	Team 2
Audace Roma	3-1	Roman

Audace Roma maintained his place in the First Division, but Roman was later admitted too.

==== Classification ====
P	Team	Pld	W	D	L	GF	GA	GD	Pts	Promotion or relegation
1.	Alba Roma	10	8	1	1	41	13	+28	17	Qualified
2.	Fortitudo Roma	10	8	0	2	35	13	+22	16	Qualified
3.	Lazio	10	6	2	2	45	27	+18	14	1926–27 Prima Divisione
4.	Audace Roma	10	3	1	6	27	42	-15	7	Merged with Alba
5.	Roman	10	2	2	6	14	28	-14	6	1926–27 Prima Divisione
6.	Pro Roma	10	0	0	10	5	44	-39	0	Merged with Fortitudo

==== Results table ====
Home \ Away	ALB	AUD	FOR	LAZ	PRO	ROM
Alba Roma	—	11–2	0–3	5–3	6–0	1–0
Audace Roma	0–7	—	2–3	2–4	4–0	2–2
Fortitudo Roma	1–3	3–2	—	6–2	7–0	4–1
Lazio	2–2	9–5	3–2	—	10–1	5–3
Pro Roma	1–2	2–3	0–1	0–6	—	0–2
Roman	1–4	1–5	0–5	1–1	3–1	—

Legend: Blue = home team win; Yellow = draw; Red = away team win.

=== Campania ===
==== Pre-League Qualifications ====
Team 1	Agg.	Team 2	1st leg	2nd leg
Stabia	● 1 point against 3 ●	Salernitanaudax	1-3	1-1

Salernitanaudax maintained his place in the First Division, but later retired. Stabia was admitted in his place.

==== Classification ====
P	Team	Pld	W	D	L	GF	GA	GD	Pts	Promotion or relegation
1.	Internaples	8	7	1	0	35	4	+31	15	Qualified
2.	Bagnolese	8	5	1	2	20	8	+12	11	Qualified
3.	Casertana	8	4	0	4	11	21	-10	8	1926–27 Prima Divisione
4.	Stabia	8	3	0	5	13	22	-9	6	Relegated to 2nd Division
5.	Puteolana	8	0	0	8	5	29	-24	0	Bankruptcy

==== Results table ====
Home \ Away	BAG	CAS	INT	PUT	STA
Bagnolese	—	2–0	1–1	3–0	6–0
Casertana	0–2	—	0–10	5–3	2–0
Internaples	4–2	2–0	—	6–0	4–1
Puteolana	0–3	1–2	0–2	—	1–3
Stabia	3–1	1–2	0–6	5–0	—

Legend: Blue = home team win; Yellow = draw; Red = away team win.

=== Apulia ===
None of the Apulian teams were admitted to the National Division.

==== Classification ====
P	Team	Pld	W	D	L	GF	GA	GD	Pts	Promotion or relegation
1.	Pro Italia Taranto	8	6	2	0	14	4	+10	14	Qualified
2.	Liberty Bari	8	5	0	3	11	8	+3	10	Qualified
3.	Audace Taranto	8	4	1	3	11	9	+2	9	1926–27 Prima Divisione
4.	Ideale Bari	8	0	5	3	6	9	-3	5	1926–27 Prima Divisione
5.	Foggia	8	0	2	6	1	13	-12	2	1926–27 Prima Divisione

==== Results table ====
Home \ Away	AUD	FOG	IDE	LIB	PRO
Audace Taranto	—	2–0	1–0	3–1	0–2
Foggia	0–2	—	0–0	1–2	0–2
Ideale Bari	2–2	0–0	—	0–1	2–2
Liberty Bari	2–0	3–0	2–1	—	0–1
Pro Italia Taranto	2–1	2–0	1–1	2–0	—

Legend: Blue = home team win; Yellow = draw; Red = away team win.

=== Sicily ===
==== Championship playoff ====
Team 1	Agg.	Team 2	1st leg	2nd leg
Palermo	7-1	Messina	7-0	0-1

Palermo was declared Sicily's champion. Both teams were admitted to the Southern League semifinals. None of the teams were admitted to the National Division.

== Semifinals ==
=== Group A ===
==== Classification ====
P	Team	Pld	W	D	L	GF	GA	GD	Pts	Promotion or relegation
1.	Internaples	8	5	3	0	23	5	+18	13	Qualified and promoted to National Division
2.	Fortitudo Roma	8	4	3	1	15	9	+6	11	Promoted to the National Division
3.	Anconitana	8	4	1	3	16	13	+3	9	1926–27 Prima Divisione
4.	Liberty Bari	8	2	3	3	18	18	0	7	1926–27 Prima Divisione
5.	Messina	8	0	0	8	2	29	-27	0	Relegated to 2nd Division

==== Results table ====
Home \ Away	ANC	FOR	INT	LIB	MES
Anconitana	—	1–3	1–1	6–1	2–0
Fortitudo Roma	2–1	—	1–1	2–2	4–0
Internaples	4–0	3–1	—	2–0	5–0
Liberty Bari	2–3	1–1	2–2	—	6–0
Messina	0–2	0–1	0–5	2–4	—

Legend: Blue = home team win; Yellow = draw; Red = away team win.

=== Group B ===
==== Classification ====
P	Team	Pld	W	D	L	GF	GA	GD	Pts	Promotion or relegation
1.	Alba Roma	8	6	2	0	19	8	+11	14	Qualified and promoted to the National Division
2.	Bagnolese	8	5	2	1	22	8	+14	12	1926–27 Prima Divisione
3.	Pro Italia Taranto	8	4	2	2	15	11	+4	10	1926–27 Prima Divisione
4.	Palermo	8	1	0	7	10	15	-5	2	1926–27 Prima Divisione
4.	Maceratese	8	1	0	7	5	29	-24	2	Bankruptcy

==== Results table ====
Home \ Away	ALB	BAG	MAC	PAL	PRO
Alba Roma	—	3–3	2–0	2–1	3–1
Bagnolese	1–2	—	8–0	3–1	2–1
Maceratese	1–5	0–2	—	2–0	0–2
Palermo	0–1	0–2	6–0	—	2–3
Pro Italia Taranto	1–1	1–1	4–2	2–0	—

Legend: Blue = home team win; Yellow = draw; Red = away team win.

== Finals ==
Team 1	Agg.	Team 2	1st leg	2nd leg
Alba Roma	7-2	Internaples	6-1	1-1

Alba Roma qualified for the National Finals.
