= Petrillo =

Petrillo may refer to:

- Petrillo (surname)
- Myrceugenia correifolia, evergreen shrub commonly referred to as "petrillo"
- Petrillo Music Shell, amphitheater in Chicago named after James Petrillo
