= 1926–27 Prima Divisione =

Italian football league season

Prima Divisione
- Season: 1926–27
- Dates: 3 October 1926 – 22 May 1927
- Champions: Novara (1st title)
- Promoted: Novara; Pro Patria; Reggiana; Lazio
- Relegated: 6 clubs in bankruptcy or disbandment
- Matches: 372

The 1926–27 Prima Divisione was the 1st edition of a second tier tournament of the Italian Football Championship which was organized at national level.

== The Carta di Viareggio ==
1926-27 Prima Divisione teams location map.
Group A; Group B; Group C; Group D.

In 1926 the Viareggio Charter reformed the Italian football organization. This important document introduced in the Italian football the status of the non-amatour player receiving a reimbursement of expenses. In this way FIGC managed to mislead FIFA, that defended strenuously sportive amateurism.

The fascist Charter transformed the old Northern League into an authoritarian and national committee, the Direttorio Divisioni Superiori, appointed by the FIGC. The second level championship, which took the diminished name of Prima Divisione, consequently had to be reformed to give space to a group of clubs from the southern half of Italy.

== Teams selection ==
The old Northern Seconda Divisione second-level championship had four local groups, so it was decided to reserve one of them for the clubs from Southern Italy in the new national Prima Divisione. More, some teams from the South were put in the first level championship too, so some Northern clubs were relegated from it. Consequently, solely half of the clubs of the old Northern second level joined the revamped cadet tournament, to give space to their Southern counterparts.

In Southern Italy the situation was different. There, the previous reform of 1921-1922 did not take place, so the pyramid of 1912 had been maintained, with the Prima Divisione, former Prima Categoria, as the sole tournament above the regional level. So, in a lexical continuity, the old Prima Divisione remained the bulk of new one, excluding three promoted teams and the last relegated ones, but with the relevant difference of the elimination of the regional qualifications.

29 Northern clubs	11 Southern clubs
7 worst clubs of the Northern League's First Division	11 out of 20 clubs of the Southern League's First Division
22 best clubs of the Northern League's Second Division	11 out of 20 clubs of the Southern League's First Division

== Group A ==
	Classification	Pts	P	W	D	L	GF	GA
1.	Novara	30	18	?	?	?	?	?
2.	Biellese	24	18
3.	Legnano	23	18
4.	Sestrese	19	18
5.	US Milanese	18	18
6.	Savona	16	18
7.	Spezia	16	18
8.	Derthona	16	18
9.	Asti	14	18
10.	Speranza	4	18

- Novara promoted to 1927–28 Divisione Nazionale.
- Speranza Savona relegated, later merged into Savona.

== Group B ==
	Classification	Pt	P	W	D	L	GF	GA
1.	Pro Patria	27	18	?	?	?	?	?
2.	Atalanta	26	18
3.	Triestina	24	18
4.	Treviso	20	18
5.	Fiumana	19	18
6.	Venezia	17	18
7.	Mantova	15	18
8.	Monfalcone	14	18
9.	Comense	12	18
10.	Udinese	6	18

- Pro Patria promoted to 1927–28 Divisione Nazionale.
- Udinese later readmitted to fill ceased memberships.

=== Results ===
Pro Patria results
Andata				Ritorno
1-1	Pro Patria	-	Monfalcone	3-1
0-2	Mantova	-	Pro Patria	0-2
1-0	Pro Patria	-	Udinese	2-1
0-1	Fiumana	-	Pro Patria	1-2
2-1	Atalanta	-	Pro Patria	0-7
2-3	Pro Patria	-	Triestina	0-2
6-1	Pro Patria	-	Comense	1-0
1-1	Venezia	-	Pro Patria	0-1
5-2	Pro Patria	-	Treviso	1-1

== Group C ==
	Classification	Pt	P	W	D	L	GF	GA
1.	Reggiana	28	18	13	2	3	43	17
2.	SPAL	25	18	11	3	4	42	26
3.	Pistoiese	24	18	11	2	5	39	22
4.	Parma	20	18	8	4	6	27	25
5.	Prato	18	18	7	4	7	30	28
6.	Fiorentina	17	18	7	3	8	24	30
7.	Lucchese	15	18	7	1	10	27	27
8.	Pisa	12	18	5	2	11	16	33
9.	Carpi	11	18	4	3	11	18	36
10.	Ancona	10	18	3	4	11	14	24

- Reggiana promoted to 1927–28 Divisione Nazionale.
- Anconitana later readmitted to fill ceased memberships.

=== Results ===
Day 1
3 October 1926		19 December 1926
3-1	Fiorentina-Pisa	0-1
0-1	Lucchese-Parma	0-1
2-1	Reggiana-Prato	1-1
-	-	-
-	-	-

Day 4
24 October 1926		9 gen. 1927
3-1	Carpi-Fiorentina	0-2
3-1	Reggiana-Lucchese	3-2
2-0	Pisa-Prato	0-3
-	-	-
-	-	-

Day 7
22 November 1926		6 March 1927
2-1	Anconitana-Fiorentina	0-1
0-2	Pisa-Spal	0-2
2-0	Reggiana-Parma	0-1
0-4	Carpi-Lucchese	2-1
-	-	-

Day 2
10 October 1926		26 December 1926
0-1	Reggiana-Fiorentina	4-3
3-1	Spal-Lucchese	0-2
1-2	Pisa-Pistoiese	0-4
-	-	-
-	-	-

Day 5
7 November 1926		16 gen. 1927
3-1	Spal-Fiorentina	2-2
2-1	Lucchese-Prato	1-5
1-0	Anconitana-Pisa	1-1
5-1	Reggiana-Carpi	1-0
-	-	-

Day 8
28 November 1926		14 March 1927
2-1	Lucchese-Fiorentina	0-2
1-2	Pisa-Reggiana	0-4
-	-	-
-	-	-
-	-	-

Day 3
17 October 1926		2 gen. 1927
1-1	Fiorentina-Parma	0-5
2-1	Lucchese-Anconitana	5-0
1-1	Carpi-Pisa	0-3
1-4	Pistoiese-Reggiana	0-3
-	-	-

Day 6
14 November 1926		13 February 1927
3-2	Fiorentina-Pistoiese	0-2
2-0	Lucchese-Pisa	0-2
1-0	Spal-Reggiana	1-6
-	-	-
-	-	-

Day 9
5 December 1926		20 March 1927
1-1	Prato-Fiorentina	0-2
0-0	Lucchese-Pistoiese	1-3
4-1	Parma-Pisa	0-2
0-0	Anconitana-Reggiana	0-3
-	-	-

== Group D ==
	Classification	Pt	P	W	D	L	GF	GA
1.	Lazio	30	18	15	0	3	34	11
2.	Liberty Bari	29	18	12	5	1	34	12
3.	Bagnolese	25	18	11	3	4	42	16
4.	Casertana	23	18	9	5	4	28	18
5.	Pro Italia Taranto	18	18	8	2	8	20	19
6.	Ideale Bari	18	18	7	4	7	20	20
7.	Foggia	16	18	5	6	7	19	20
8.	Audace Taranto	11	18	5	1	12	13	35
9.	Roman	10	18	3	4	11	23	39
10.	Palermo	0	18	0	0	18	1	44

=== Events ===
Prima Divisione Sud
- Season: 1926–27

- Lazio promoted to 1927–28 Divisione Nazionale.

Bankruptcies

- Ilva Bagnolese and Casertana both bankrupted.
- Palermo relegated and bankrupted.

Mergers

- Pro Italia Taranto merged with Audace Taranto into Taranto.
- Roman merged with Alba and Fortitudo into Roma.

== Final Group ==
	Finals	Pt	P	W	D	L	GF	GA
1.	Novara	8	6	3	2	1	20	10
2.	Pro Patria	6	6	3	0	3	11	12
3.	Reggiana	5	6	2	1	3	9	10
4.	Lazio	5	6	2	1	3	11	19

- Novara champions 1926-27.

=== Results ===
Day 1
April 17, 1927		May 15, 1927
3-2	Lazio-Pro Patria	2-3
4-2	Novara-Reggiana	1-1

Day 2
April 24, 1927		May 8, 1927
2-1	Pro Patria-Novara	2-3
3-1	Reggiana-Lazio	0-2

Day 3
May 1, 1927		May 22, 1927
3-1	Reggiana-Pro Patria	0-1
2-2	Lazio-Novara	1-9
