= Oscar Piantoni =

Italian football player and manager (1949–2018)

Personal information
- Date of birth: 1949
- Place of birth: Gandino, Italy
- Date of death: 20 June 2018 (aged 69)
- Place of death: Bergamo, Italy

Managerial career
- Years: Team
- 1980–1982: Alzano
- 1982–1986: Darfo Boario
- 1986–1987: Romanese
- 1987–1988: Melzo
- 1988–1990: Romanese
- 1990–1993: Lumezzane
- 1993–1997: Alzano Virescit
- 1997–1998: Albinese
- 1998–2001: AlbinoLeffe
- 2001–2002: Alessandria
- 2002–2004: Monza
- 2004–2005: Nuova Albano
- 2005–2006: Liberty Oradea
- 2006–2007: Valenzana
- 2007–2008: Caravaggese
- 2008–2009: Pergocrema
- 2009–2010: AlzanoCene

Oscar Piantoni (1949 – 20 June 2018) was an Italian professional football manager.

== Career ==
Piantoni was born in 1949 in Gandino, in the Province of Bergamo, Italy. He most notably coached Alzano Virescit from 1993 to 1997 between the Serie D and the Serie C1, and was AlbinoLeffe's first head coach between 1998 and 2001, helping them to promotion to the Serie C1.

Piantoni also coached Alessandria, Monza, Valenzana, Caravaggese and Pergocrema in Italy. He moved to Romania; initially Walter Zenga's assistant at Naţional București, Piantoni then took charge of Divizia B side Liberty Oradea in 2005–06, helping them to promotion to the Divizia A.

== Personal life ==
Piantoni had a sister, Laura. He and his wife, Raffaella, had two daughters: Alessia and Rossana.

On 20 June 2018, Piantoni died aged 69 at the Papa Giovanni XXIII hospital of Bergamo.
