= Alessio De Petrillo =

Italian football manager (1967)

Personal information
- Full name: Alessio De Petrillo
- Date of birth: 22 November 1967 (age 59)
- Place of birth: Pisa, Italy
- Position: Midfielder

Youth career
- 1985–1986: Pisa

Senior career*
Years	Team	Apps	(Gls)
1986–1987	Empoli	0	(0)
1987–1988	Foggia		
1988–1989	Olbia	13	(0)
1989–1992	Cuneo	20+	(2+)
1992–1993	Aosta		

Managerial career
- 2000–2002: Ellera
- 2002–2003: Cascina
- 2003: Sansovino
- 2004–2005: Cascina
- 2005–2006: Pontedera
- 2006–2007: Gubbio
- 2007–2009: Pisa
- 2010: Monza
- 2011: Alessandria
- 2013: Foligno
- 2015–2016: Prato
- 2017: Tuttocuoio
- 2018–2019: Prato
- * Club domestic league appearances and goals

Alessio De Petrillo (born 21 November 1967) is an Italian football coach and former player. He was most recently an assistant coach of the Poland national team.

== Career ==
=== Footballer ===
Won of Lino De Petrillo, Pisa player and captain for long, he started playing in the nerazzurri youth team.

He played in 1986-87 for Empoli, never debuting in Serie A; he later spent his career in Serie C with several teams.

=== Coach ===
As a coach, he got his first experience in Serie D with Cascina. He even managed Sansovino and Gubbio in Serie C2 and Monza in Lega Pro Prima Divisione (2010-11).

He has been the coach of Alessandria in Lega Pro Seconda Divisione until September 28, 2011. In October 2018, he became the manager of Prato for the second time. He left Prato at the end of the 2018–19 season as the team finished in 9th place and failed to return to Serie C. In January 2021, he joined Legia Warsaw as an assistant coach under Czesław Michniewicz. De Petrillo later joined his staff at the Poland national team on 31 May 2022.
