= EcoHouse Group =

Defunct UK companies

EcoHouse Group Developments Ltd (in compulsory liquidation)
- Company type: Private
- Founded: 11 December 2012
- Founder: Anthony Armstrong Emery a/k/a Anthony Armstrong
- Defunct: 16 February 2015 (Liquidation commenced); 8 January 2018 (Liquidation concluded); 24 November 2022 (Dissolution date)

EcoHouse Developments Ltd
- Company type: Private
- Founded: 28 May 2010
- Defunct: 15 January 2015 (Liquidation commenced); 14 February 2018 (Dissolved)

EcoHouse Group Developments Ltd and EcoHouse Developments Ltd are defunct UK companies, registered in England and Wales.

The companies claimed to have been specialising in the construction of social housing through the Brazilian government's Minha Casa, Minha Vida programme; however, in August 2014 the Brazilian Embassy in Singapore (where Ecohouse attracted many investors) stated that the company had no relationship with the Brazilian government.

In November 2014 it appeared the company was not on the government's list of participants in the scheme, and the companies are subject to fraud investigations by the Brazilian police.

== Background ==
Launched in 2007 by Anthony Armstrong Emery, it offered investors 20% return on their £23,000 investments after 12 months.

EcoHouse stopped selling Brazilian properties in Singapore after investors filed against the company for failing to return investment money on time.

In August 2014, after Ecohouse closed its Singapore offices suddenly, the Brazilian Embassy there denied any relationship between the Brazilian government and Ecohouse, stating that there is "no link whatsoever" and that they "feel sorry for these investors". Ecohouse was apparently not regulated by the Monetary Authority of Singapore. The Brazilian tax authorities in 2014 stated that the company had been under investigation for 8 months.

In 2019 the directors were banned from being involved in the running of companies for 14 years.
