= 1948–49 Serie C =

The 1948–49 Serie C was the eleventh edition of Serie C, the third highest league in the Italian football league system, the first one to be organized by the Lega Nazionale.

== Legend ==
Promoted
Relegated
Bankruptcy

== Girone A ==
Northwest Italy

Pos	Team	Pld	Pts
1	Fanfulla	42	56
2	Savona	42	55
3	Mortara	42	53
4	Sanremese	42	51
5	Casale	42	48
6	Vogherese	42	48
7	Gallaratese	42	47
8	Pro Vercelli	42	47
9	Biellese	42	47
10	Varese	42	44 (Note: 1 point deducted.)
11	Crema	42	42
12	Monza	42	42
13	Fossanese	42	41
14	Pro Lissone	42	39
15	Asti	42	36
16	Parabiago	42	36
17	Vita Nova	42	36
18	Sestrese	42	36
19	Piacenza	42	36
20	Vigevano	42	34
21	Sestri Levante	42	30
22	Magenta	42	21

== Girone B ==
Northeast Italy

Pos	Team	Pld	Pts
1	Udinese	38	54
2	Libertas Trieste	38	53
3	Treviso	38	50
4	Mestrina	38	46
5	Mantova	38	43
6	Pro Gorizia	38	43
7	Baracca Lugo	38	42
8	Cesena	38	41
9	Rimini	38	40
10	Bolzano	38	40
11	Pavia	38	39
12	Marzotto	38	38
13	Pro Palazzolo	38	30
14	Omegna	38	30
15	Edera	38	29
16	Bondenese	38	29
17	Pro Rovigo	38	28
18	Montebelluna	38	27
19	Suzzara	38	26
20	Centese	38	24

== Girone C ==
Central Italy

Pos	Team	Pld	Pts
1	Prato	40	58 (Note: Prato promoted to 1949–50 Serie B after two tie-breakers with Carrarese: Prato-Carrarese 3-3, 1-0.)
2	Carrarese	40	58
3	Grosseto	40	53
4	Piombino	40	48
5	Maceratese	40	46
6	Solvay Rosignano	40	44
7	Monsummanese	40	43
8	Sambenedettese	40	41
9	Arezzo	40	40
10	Anconitana	40	40
11	Vigor Fucecchio	40	40
12	Ternana	40	38
13	Pistoiese	40	38
14	Carbosarda	40	37
15	Cagliari	40	36
16	Tivoli	40	36
17	Siena	40	34
18	Perugia	40	31
19	Massese	40	30
20	Viareggio	40	29
21	Gubbio	40	20

== Girone D ==
Southern Italy

Pos	Team	Pld	Pts
1	Catania	36	45
2	Benevento	36	43
3	Reggina	36	42
4	Messina	36	40
5	Cosenza	36	35
6	Foggia	36	33
7	Stabia	36	33
8	Igea Virtus	36	33
9	Nocerina	36	33
10	Drepanum	36	33
11	Acireale	36	32
12	Brindisi	36	31
13	Crotone	36	29
14	Arsenale Messina	36	28
15	Catanzaro	36	28
16	Torrese	36	25
17	Monticchio Potenza	36	24
18	Scafatese	(12)	0 (Note: Retired after 12 matches for financial problems.)
19	Avellino	36	45 (Note: After winning a tie-breaker with Catania for promotion to 1949–50 Serie B (1-0), Avellino was found guilty of sport illicit, demoted to the last place and relegated.)
