= 1950–51 Serie C =

Football tournament edition

The 1950–51 Serie C was the thirteenth edition of Serie C, the third highest league in the Italian football league system.

== Legend ==
Promoted
Relegated

Two additional relegations for each group to reduce the league from thirty-eight to thirty-four matchdays.

== Group A (North-West) ==
Pos	Team	Pld	Pts
1	Monza (P)	38	56
2	Sanremese	38	54
3	Pavia	38	53
4	Alessandria	38	48
5	Lecco	38	44
6	Casale	38	41
7	Savona	38	40
8	Gallaratese	38	40
9	Biellese	38	38
10	Rapallo Ruentes	38	37
11	Saronno	38	37
12	Villasanta	38	36
13	Varese	38	35
14	Fossanese	38	34
15	Pro Vercelli	38	34
16	Magenta (R)	38	33
17	Omegna (R)	38	26
18	Luino (R)	38	25
19	Sestrese (R)	38	25
20	Mortara (R)	38	24

Source: Panini
(P) Promoted; (R) Relegated

== Group B (North-East) ==
Pos	Team	Pld	Pts
1	Marzotto (P)	38	52 (Note: Promoted after tie-breaker: Marzotto-Marzoli Palazzolo 3-1)
2	Marzoli Palazzolo	38	52
3	Parma	38	49
4	Mantova	38	46
5	Forlì	38	45
6	Edera	38	42
7	Pro Gorizia	38	42
8	Ponte San Pietro	38	40
9	Crema	38	39
10	Vigevano	38	37
11	Piacenza	38	36
12	Mestrina	38	36
13	Rovereto	38	36
14	Sandonà	38	33
15	Ponziana	38	36
16	Pro Sesto (R)	38	32
17	Rimini (R)	38	31
18	Libertas Trieste (R)	38	29
19	Bolzano (R)	38	26
20	Cesena (R)	38	24

Source: Panini
(P) Promoted; (R) Relegated

== Group C (Centre) ==
Pos	Team	Pld	Pts
1	Piombino (P)	38	55
2	Siena	38	48
3	Colleferro	38	46
4	Sambenedettese	38	45
5	Cagliari	38	43
6	Prato	38	42
7	Maceratese	38	42
8	Carbosarda	38	40
9	Arezzo	38	39
10	Pontedera	38	38
11	Empoli	38	37
12	Jesina	38	37
13	Rosignano Solvay	38	36
14	Latina	38	36
15	Fermana	38	35
16	Pistoiese (R)	38	35 (Note: Relegated after tie-breaker: Fermana-Pistoiese 1-0.)
17	Carrarese (R)	38	33
18	Perugia (R)	38	33
19	Grosseto (R)	38	20
20	Le Signe (R)	38	19 (Note: 1 point deducted.)

Source: Panini
(P) Promoted; (R) Relegated

== Group D (South) ==
Pos	Team	Pld	Pts
1	Stabia (P)	36	52 (Note: Promoted after tie-breaker: Stabia-Foggia 2-0)
2	Foggia	36	52
3	Lecce	36	44
4	Casertana	36	42
5	Catanzaro	36	40
6	Cosenza	36	38
7	ArsenalTaranto	36	38
8	Crotone	36	36
9	Marsala	36	36
10	Toma Maglie	36	36
11	Brindisi	36	36
12	Benevento	36	35
13	Reggina	36	35
14	Nissena	36	34
15	Avellino (R)	36	32
16	Acireale (R)	36	32
17	Igea Virtus (R)	36	29
18	Arsenale Messina (R)	36	27
19	Torrese (R)	36	9 (Note: 1 point deducted.)

Source: Panini
(P) Promoted; (R) Relegated
