= 1947–48 Serie B =

Italian football league season

Serie B
- Season: 1947–48

This championship had three groups organized with geographical criteria for the last time. The round-robin system should be restored in 1948.

== Teams ==
Six clubs had been promoted from the three Serie C leagues, while Brescia and Venezia had been relegated from Serie A, and US Cagliari was restored after 7 years following the end of the American occupation of Sardinia.

== Events ==
11 out of 18 clubs per group should be relegated to restore the national round-robin tournament.

== Group A ==
=== Final classification ===
| Pos | Team | Pld | W | D | L | GF | GA | GR | Pts | Promotion or relegation |
|---|---|---|---|---|---|---|---|---|---|---|
| 1 | Novara (P) | 34 | 19 | 8 | 7 | 54 | 26 | 2.077 | 46 | Promotion to Serie A |
| 2 | Brescia | 34 | 15 | 12 | 7 | 42 | 26 | 1.615 | 42 | |
| 3 | Como | 34 | 14 | 13 | 7 | 49 | 36 | 1.361 | 41 | |
| 4 | Seregno | 34 | 15 | 10 | 9 | 52 | 36 | 1.444 | 40 | |
| 4 | Legnano | 34 | 17 | 6 | 11 | 62 | 45 | 1.378 | 40 | |
| 4 | Spezia | 34 | 17 | 6 | 11 | 46 | 35 | 1.314 | 40 | |
| 7 | Pro Sesto | 34 | 14 | 11 | 9 | 45 | 33 | 1.364 | 39 | Relegation tie-breaker |
| 8 | Crema (R) | 34 | 14 | 11 | 9 | 44 | 34 | 1.294 | 39 | Serie C after tie-breaker |
| 9 | Vigevano (R) | 34 | 15 | 7 | 12 | 45 | 36 | 1.250 | 37 | Relegation to Serie C |
| 10 | Gallaratese (R) | 34 | 15 | 6 | 13 | 45 | 33 | 1.364 | 36 | Relegation to Serie C |
| 11 | Fanfulla (R) | 34 | 14 | 7 | 13 | 48 | 46 | 1.043 | 35 | Relegation to Serie C |
| 11 | Viareggio (R) | 34 | 16 | 3 | 15 | 51 | 58 | 0.879 | 35 | Relegation to Serie C |
| 13 | Pro Vercelli (R) | 34 | 11 | 9 | 14 | 46 | 44 | 1.045 | 31 | Relegation to Serie C |
| 14 | Varese (Note: 1 point deducted) (R) | 34 | 9 | 9 | 16 | 35 | 42 | 0.833 | 26 | Relegation to Serie C |
| 15 | Vita Nova (R) | 34 | 10 | 5 | 19 | 42 | 69 | 0.609 | 25 | Relegation to Serie C |
| 16 | Magenta (R) | 34 | 9 | 4 | 21 | 31 | 54 | 0.574 | 22 | Relegation to Serie C |
| 17 | Vogherese (R) | 34 | 6 | 7 | 21 | 36 | 73 | 0.493 | 19 | Relegation to Serie C |
| 18 | Cagliari (R) | 34 | 7 | 4 | 23 | 32 | 79 | 0.405 | 18 | Relegation to Serie C |

Source: Panini
(P) Promoted; (R) Relegated

=== Results ===
| Home \ Away | BRE | CAG | COM | CRM | FAN | GLR | LEG | MAG | NOV | PSE | PVE | SER | SPE | VAR | VIA | VIG | VTN | VOG |
|---|---|---|---|---|---|---|---|---|---|---|---|---|---|---|---|---|---|---|
| Brescia | | 3–0 | 2–0 | 1–1 | 1–0 | 2–2 | 4–1 | 0–0 | 0–0 | 0–0 | 1–0 | 2–1 | 0–0 | 1–0 | 2–0 | 0–0 | 3–1 | 4–1 |
| Cagliari | 1–2 | | 1–0 | 0–0 | 1–1 | 0–3 | 2–4 | 3–1 | 0–2 | 2–3 | 2–0 | 2–3 | 2–4 | 2–0 | 2–2 | 1–1 | 0–3 | 1–0 |
| Como | 1–0 | 4–1 | | 1–0 | 1–0 | 1–0 | 1–1 | 2–0 | 3–2 | 1–1 | 2–1 | 2–0 | 0–0 | 3–2 | 4–1 | 3–0 | 1–1 | 3–0 |
| Crema | 3–0 | 5–1 | 1–1 | | 2–1 | 0–1 | 0–0 | 2–0 | 2–0 | 0–0 | 1–0 | 2–1 | 3–0 | 2–2 | 0–1 | 2–0 | 3–1 | 1–1 |
| Fanfulla | 2–2 | 5–0 | 2–0 | 3–0 | | 2–3 | 1–1 | 2–0 | 1–0 | 3–2 | 0–0 | 3–2 | 2–1 | 1–0 | 4–2 | 1–0 | 6–1 | 3–1 |
| Gallaratese | 1–0 | 6–0 | 1–1 | 3–0 | 0–0 | | 0–2 | 0–1 | 1–1 | 1–2 | 2–0 | 0–0 | 3–1 | 1–0 | 2–0 | 1–0 | 3–0 | 4–1 |
| Legnano | 1–2 | 3–0 | 2–0 | 3–1 | 4–0 | 2–0 | | 4–0 | 0–4 | 0–0 | 1–1 | 2–2 | 2–1 | 4–1 | 2–1 | 3–2 | 4–0 | 4–0 |
| Magenta | 0–2 | 1–0 | 1–1 | 1–0 | 0–1 | 1–2 | 2–0 | | 0–1 | 1–1 | 4–3 | 1–1 | 1–0 | 0–1 | 3–0 | 0–2 | 0–1 | 2–0 |
| Novara | 2–1 | 4–1 | 2–2 | 1–1 | 3–0 | 2–0 | 2–0 | 3–2 | | 3–1 | 2–1 | 0–1 | 1–2 | 1–0 | 3–1 | 1–0 | 2–0 | 3–0 |
| Pro Sesto | 0–1 | 2–0 | 1–1 | 0–0 | 3–0 | 2–1 | 2–1 | 4–2 | 0–0 | | 2–1 | 1–1 | 2–0 | 2–0 | 3–0 | 2–0 | 1–1 | 3–1 |
| Pro Vercelli | 0–0 | 2–0 | 3–0 | 1–1 | 3–1 | 1–1 | 2–1 | 2–0 | 1–3 | 3–1 | | 1–2 | 3–0 | 2–2 | 3–1 | 1–4 | 3–3 | 2–0 |
| Seregno | 2–1 | 1–2 | 3–3 | 3–0 | 4–0 | 1–0 | 2–0 | 2–0 | 0–1 | 2–0 | 0–0 | | 3–1 | 1–1 | 3–1 | 2–2 | 2–0 | 2–0 |
| Spezia | 1–1 | 4–0 | 2–0 | 2–1 | 2–0 | 2–1 | 2–1 | 2–1 | 3–1 | 1–0 | 4–0 | 1–0 | | 3–0 | 1–2 | 0–0 | 1–2 | 2–0 |
| Varese | 0–0 | 3–1 | 0–0 | 1–1 | 1–0 | 0–1 | 5–0 | 0–1 | 0–0 | 1–0 | 0–0 | 2–1 | 0–0 | | 3–0 | 2–3 | 1–4 | 3–1 |
| Viareggio | 2–0 | 3–2 | 2–1 | 1–2 | 1–0 | 3–0 | 0–1 | 3–1 | 1–0 | 2–1 | 1–0 | 0–0 | 2–0 | 3–0 | | 2–1 | 7–2 | 4–3 |
| Vigevano | 1–0 | 1–0 | 0–0 | 1–2 | 3–1 | 2–1 | 3–1 | 1–0 | 1–4 | 0–1 | 1–0 | 1–1 | 0–0 | 2–0 | 4–0 | | 3–0 | 5–0 |
| Vita Nova | 0–2 | 0–1 | 1–4 | 1–2 | 0–0 | 1–0 | 1–2 | 3–2 | 0–0 | 1–0 | 1–4 | 4–2 | 0–1 | 0–4 | 4–1 | 4–0 | | 1–3 |
| Vogherese | 2–2 | 3–1 | 2–2 | 1–3 | 2–2 | 2–0 | 1–5 | 5–2 | 0–0 | 2–2 | 0–2 | 0–1 | 1–2 | 1–0 | 1–1 | 0–1 | 1–0 | |

Source: Almanacco Illustrato del Calcio - La Storia 1898-2004, Panini Edizioni, Modena, September 2005 (in Italian)
Legend: Blue = home team win; Yellow = draw; Red = away team win.

=== Relegation tie-breaker ===
Played in Melzo:

| Team 1 | Score | Team 2 |
|---|---|---|
| Crema | 1-2 | Pro Sesto |

Crema relegated to Serie C.

== Group B ==
=== Final classification ===
| Pos | Team | Pld | W | D | L | GF | GA | GR | Pts | Promotion or relegation |
|---|---|---|---|---|---|---|---|---|---|---|
| 1 | Padova (P) | 34 | 21 | 9 | 4 | 71 | 29 | 2.448 | 51 | Promotion to Serie A |
| 2 | Verona | 34 | 18 | 10 | 6 | 50 | 25 | 2.000 | 46 | |
| 3 | S.P.A.L. | 34 | 18 | 7 | 9 | 56 | 32 | 1.750 | 43 | |
| 4 | Venezia | 34 | 16 | 8 | 10 | 48 | 36 | 1.333 | 40 | |
| 5 | Reggiana | 34 | 13 | 13 | 8 | 52 | 37 | 1.405 | 39 | |
| 6 | Cremonese | 34 | 15 | 8 | 11 | 52 | 28 | 1.857 | 38 | Relegation tie-breaker |
| 7 | Parma | 34 | 12 | 14 | 8 | 33 | 28 | 1.179 | 38 | Relegation tie-breaker |
| 8 | Prato (R) | 34 | 14 | 10 | 10 | 49 | 41 | 1.195 | 38 | Serie C after tie-breaker |
| 9 | Piacenza (R) | 34 | 15 | 6 | 13 | 47 | 55 | 0.855 | 36 | Relegation to Serie C |
| 10 | Mantova (R) | 34 | 13 | 9 | 12 | 46 | 40 | 1.150 | 35 (Note: The match Mantova-Udinese was voided because of irregular signings by both teams. The FIGC decided that both teams had lost the match 0-2. The original result was 2-2.) | Relegation to Serie C |
| 11 | Udinese (R) | 34 | 13 | 7 | 14 | 45 | 44 | 1.023 | 33 | Relegation to Serie C |
| 12 | Bolzano (R) | 34 | 11 | 11 | 12 | 38 | 51 | 0.745 | 33 | Relegation to Serie C |
| 13 | Treviso (R) | 34 | 8 | 14 | 12 | 36 | 47 | 0.766 | 30 | Relegation to Serie C |
| 14 | Pistoiese (R) | 34 | 8 | 11 | 15 | 36 | 55 | 0.655 | 27 | Relegation to Serie C |
| 15 | Pro Gorizia (R) | 34 | 8 | 7 | 19 | 38 | 64 | 0.594 | 23 | Relegation to Serie C |
| 16 | Carrarese (R) | 34 | 6 | 10 | 18 | 32 | 65 | 0.492 | 22 | Relegation to Serie C |
| 17 | Suzzara (R) | 34 | 7 | 6 | 21 | 29 | 57 | 0.509 | 20 | Relegation to Serie C |
| 18 | Centese (R) | 34 | 5 | 10 | 19 | 28 | 56 | 0.500 | 20 | Relegation to Serie C |

Source: Panini
(P) Promoted; (R) Relegated

=== Results ===
| Home \ Away | BLZ | CAR | CEN | CRE | MAN | PAD | PAR | PIA | PST | PRA | PGO | REA | SPA | SUZ | TRV | UDI | VEN | HEL |
|---|---|---|---|---|---|---|---|---|---|---|---|---|---|---|---|---|---|---|
| Bolzano | | 0–0 | 0–1 | 0–0 | 2–1 | 1–1 | 1–0 | 3–1 | 2–2 | 4–3 | 1–1 | 2–1 | 2–1 | 3–0 | 1–0 | 0–0 | 0–1 | 1–1 |
| Carrarese | 2–2 | | 2–1 | 1–5 | 2–3 | 0–4 | 1–1 | 2–0 | 3–1 | 0–1 | 1–1 | 1–0 | 1–3 | 0–0 | 0–1 | 0–5 | 2–0 | 0–1 |
| Centese | 0–1 | 1–0 | | 0–0 | 3–0 | 0–3 | 1–2 | 1–1 | 0–0 | 0–0 | 0–1 | 1–3 | 1–4 | 2–1 | 1–1 | 0–0 | 1–2 | 0–0 |
| Cremonese | 2–0 | 3–1 | 1–0 | | 2–1 | 1–0 | 2–0 | 5–0 | 2–0 | 0–1 | 8–0 | 2–2 | 1–2 | 3–1 | 2–1 | 1–1 | 0–0 | 3–1 |
| Mantova | 2–0 | 4–1 | 2–0 | 2–1 | | 1–1 | 1–1 | 4–1 | 2–0 | 2–0 | 1–0 | 0–0 | 1–0 | 1–1 | 1–1 | – (Note: The match Mantova-Udinese was voided because of irregular signings by both teams. The FIGC decided that both teams had lost the match 0-2. The original result was 2-2.) | 1–2 | 3–0 |
| Padova | 6–2 | 4–0 | 2–1 | 1–0 | 4–1 | | 1–1 | 3–3 | 2–1 | 2–1 | 4–1 | 2–0 | 1–1 | 4–0 | 3–1 | 3–0 | 2–0 | 3–1 |
| Parma | 2–1 | 0–0 | 2–0 | 1–0 | 0–0 | 0–0 | | 2–0 | 2–2 | 1–0 | 2–0 | 2–1 | 2–0 | 3–2 | 1–1 | 0–1 | 2–1 | 1–1 |
| Piacenza | 2–0 | 2–1 | 1–1 | 2–1 | 3–1 | 1–0 | 3–2 | | 3–1 | 2–0 | 1–2 | 3–1 | 2–1 | 1–0 | 2–2 | 4–1 | 0–3 | 0–0 |
| Pistoiese | 1–2 | 0–0 | 2–2 | 0–1 | 3–2 | 1–1 | 0–2 | 1–0 | | 1–0 | 2–1 | 0–0 | 3–2 | 2–1 | 1–1 | 2–1 | 4–1 | 0–2 |
| Prato | 2–2 | 2–2 | 3–2 | 0–0 | 2–1 | 1–1 | 0–0 | 3–0 | 2–2 | | 4–0 | 2–2 | 0–2 | 2–0 | 2–1 | 2–0 | 4–1 | 1–0 |
| Pro Gorizia | 2–2 | 1–2 | 5–1 | 2–2 | 0–2 | 1–2 | 1–1 | 0–2 | 2–0 | 3–2 | | 0–2 | 3–4 | 1–0 | 0–0 | 1–0 | 0–1 | 1–0 |
| Reggiana | 1–0 | 3–1 | 5–2 | 1–1 | 4–1 | 1–0 | 0–0 | 2–1 | 4–0 | 1–1 | 4–2 | | 0–0 | 3–1 | 1–1 | 3–0 | 0–0 | 1–1 |
| SPAL | 3–1 | 5–1 | 2–1 | 2–1 | 1–1 | 1–2 | 0–0 | 2–0 | 2–0 | 0–1 | 2–1 | 1–1 | | 4–1 | 2–0 | 1–0 | 5–1 | 0–1 |
| Suzzara | 1–0 | 2–1 | 1–1 | 2–1 | 0–3 | 1–2 | 1–0 | 0–2 | 3–0 | 0–2 | 2–0 | 1–3 | 0–0 | | 0–1 | 4–3 | 0–0 | 1–1 |
| Treviso | 1–1 | 1–1 | 2–0 | 0–1 | 1–0 | 1–5 | 0–0 | 1–2 | 2–2 | 2–1 | 4–3 | 1–1 | 0–0 | 2–1 | | 3–0 | 1–1 | 1–3 |
| Udinese | 3–1 | 4–0 | 2–1 | 1–0 | 1–1 | 0–1 | 1–0 | 2–2 | 2–0 | 1–2 | 2–2 | 2–1 | 0–1 | 1–0 | 5–0 | | 3–2 | 1–0 |
| Venezia | 2–0 | 2–2 | 0–2 | 1–0 | 0–0 | 4–1 | 1–0 | 4–0 | 0–0 | 5–1 | 1–0 | 4–0 | 0–1 | 2–0 | 2–1 | 3–1 | | 0–1 |
| Hellas Verona | 5–0 | 2–1 | 5–0 | 1–0 | 1–0 | 0–0 | 4–0 | 3–0 | 3–2 | 1–1 | 2–0 | 1–0 | 2–1 | 3–1 | 1–0 | 1–1 | 1–1 | |

Source: Almanacco Illustrato del Calcio - La Storia 1898-2004, Panini Edizioni, Modena, September 2005 (in Italian)
Legend: Blue = home team win; Yellow = draw; Red = away team win.

=== Relegation tie-breaker ===
| Team 1 | Score | Team 2 |
|---|---|---|
| Cremonese | 5-1 | Parma |
| Cremonese | 1-1 | Prato |
| Parma | 2-1 | Prato |

A.C. Prato relegated to Serie C.

== Group C ==
=== Final classification ===
| Pos | Team | Pld | W | D | L | GF | GA | GR | Pts | Promotion or relegation |
|---|---|---|---|---|---|---|---|---|---|---|
| 1 | Palermo (P) | 34 | 19 | 8 | 7 | 66 | 30 | 2.200 | 46 | Promotion to Serie A |
| 2 | Pisa | 34 | 19 | 7 | 8 | 62 | 34 | 1.824 | 45 | |
| 3 | Lecce | 34 | 18 | 7 | 9 | 70 | 36 | 1.944 | 43 | |
| 3 | ArsenalTaranto | 34 | 17 | 9 | 8 | 65 | 39 | 1.667 | 43 | |
| 5 | Empoli | 34 | 17 | 6 | 11 | 50 | 36 | 1.389 | 40 | |
| 5 | Siracusa | 34 | 16 | 8 | 10 | 36 | 33 | 1.091 | 40 | |
| 7 | Pescara | 34 | 16 | 6 | 12 | 49 | 42 | 1.167 | 38 | |
| 8 | Siena (R) | 34 | 13 | 10 | 11 | 47 | 34 | 1.382 | 36 | Relegation to Serie C |
| 9 | Anconitana (R) | 34 | 16 | 3 | 15 | 51 | 52 | 0.981 | 35 | Relegation to Serie C |
| 10 | Cosenza (R) | 34 | 12 | 9 | 13 | 38 | 48 | 0.792 | 33 | Relegation to Serie C |
| 11 | Ternana (R) | 34 | 11 | 9 | 14 | 54 | 63 | 0.857 | 31 | Relegation to Serie C |
| 12 | Nocerina (R) | 34 | 13 | 4 | 17 | 39 | 42 | 0.929 | 30 | Relegation to Serie C |
| 12 | Torrese (R) | 34 | 11 | 8 | 15 | 48 | 59 | 0.814 | 30 | Relegation to Serie C |
| 12 | Scafatese (R) | 34 | 11 | 8 | 15 | 30 | 46 | 0.652 | 30 | Relegation to Serie C |
| 15 | Rieti (R, E, R) | 34 | 9 | 8 | 17 | 44 | 67 | 0.657 | 26 | Relegation to Promozione (Note: Rieti went bankrupt at the end of the season and lost their professional status, so they were relegated directly to the amatorial championship.) |
| 16 | Perugia (R) | 34 | 9 | 7 | 18 | 38 | 57 | 0.667 | 25 | Relegation to Serie C |
| 17 | Gubbio (R) | 34 | 9 | 5 | 20 | 38 | 69 | 0.551 | 22 (Note: 1 point deducted) | Relegation to Serie C |
| 18 | Brindisi (R) | 34 | 5 | 8 | 21 | 21 | 59 | 0.356 | 18 | Relegation to Serie C |

Source: Panini
(E) Eliminated; (P) Promoted; (R) Relegated

=== Results ===
| Home \ Away | ANC | ARS | BRI | COS | EMP | GUB | LCE | NOC | PAL | PER | PES | PIS | RIE | SCF | SIE | SIR | TER | TRS |
|---|---|---|---|---|---|---|---|---|---|---|---|---|---|---|---|---|---|---|
| Anconitana | | 1–1 | 3–0 | 2–0 | 1–0 | 1–0 | 2–6 | 3–1 | 2–1 | 2–1 | 0–1 | 1–2 | 2–2 | 0–0 | 2–0 | 4–0 | 4–1 | 4–1 |
| ArsenalTaranto | 2–3 | | 3–2 | 5–1 | 3–1 | 9–0 | 1–1 | 3–0 | 0–0 | 4–1 | 1–0 | 1–2 | 2–1 | 2–1 | 2–1 | 2–2 | 4–1 | 1–0 |
| Brindisi | 0–1 | 0–4 | | 2–0 | 1–3 | 1–2 | 1–0 | 1–1 | 0–0 | 2–1 | 1–0 | 0–2 | 2–1 | 0–2 | 0–2 | 0–0 | 0–0 | 0–0 |
| Cosenza | 4–1 | 0–0 | 3–0 | | 1–2 | 2–1 | 2–0 | 3–1 | 3–2 | 1–3 | 2–0 | 0–0 | 1–1 | 3–1 | 1–1 | 1–0 | 1–0 | 3–0 |
| Empoli | 0–1 | 1–0 | 3–0 | 1–1 | | 1–1 | 3–1 | 1–0 | 0–0 | 4–1 | 1–0 | 1–0 | 3–1 | 3–0 | 1–0 | 1–1 | 4–2 | 1–0 |
| Gubbio | 0–1 | 2–1 | 2–2 | 1–2 | 0–2 | | 1–1 | 1–0 | 0–2 | 2–1 | 1–2 | 0–1 | 2–2 | 6–0 | 1–2 | 0–0 | 1–0 | 3–1 |
| Lecce | 3–1 | 1–1 | 1–0 | 4–0 | 2–1 | 4–1 | | 1–1 | 3–0 | 4–0 | 3–0 | 3–1 | 2–1 | 2–0 | 5–1 | 3–0 | 1–0 | 6–0 |
| Nocerina | 3–0 | 0–0 | 3–1 | 2–0 | 1–0 | 5–1 | 1–0 | | 0–3 | 2–0 | 2–0 | 4–2 | 3–1 | 1–0 | 1–0 | 0–1 | 2–4 | 3–0 |
| Palermo | 3–2 | 3–0 | 3–1 | 3–0 | 0–0 | 5–1 | 2–2 | 1–0 | | 2–0 | 3–1 | 2–0 | 4–2 | 3–1 | 2–1 | 0–1 | 8–0 | 2–1 |
| Perugia | 3–1 | 2–3 | 1–1 | 1–1 | 1–0 | 3–0 | 1–2 | 2–0 | 0–3 | | 1–1 | 1–1 | 1–2 | 1–0 | 2–0 | 3–0 | 2–1 | 1–1 |
| Pescara | 0–2 | 3–3 | 3–2 | 3–1 | 6–1 | 1–0 | 2–1 | 1–0 | 0–0 | 2–0 | | 3–1 | 3–1 | 3–0 | 2–1 | 3–0 | 3–2 | 1–0 |
| Pisa | 3–0 | 2–0 | 1–0 | 3–0 | 1–1 | 2–1 | 1–0 | 5–1 | 3–1 | 2–1 | 3–0 | | 6–0 | 3–0 | 0–0 | 2–0 | 3–0 | 4–1 |
| Rieti | 3–2 | 2–0 | 2–0 | 1–0 | 1–0 | 0–2 | 1–0 | 1–0 | 1–4 | 1–1 | 1–1 | 5–1 | | 1–0 | 1–0 | 5–2 | 2–0 | 2–2 |
| Scafatese | 2–1 | 2–0 | 2–0 | 0–0 | 1–0 | 2–0 | 1–1 | 1–0 | 1–1 | 3–1 | 2–0 | 1–1 | 1–0 | | 2–1 | 1–1 | 2–2 | 1–1 |
| Siena | 3–0 | 0–0 | 6–0 | 3–0 | 1–0 | 1–3 | 1–1 | 0–0 | 1–1 | 1–1 | 1–1 | 0–0 | 5–1 | 1–0 | | 1–0 | 5–2 | 3–0 |
| Siracusa | 1–0 | 1–2 | 1–0 | 0–0 | 2–1 | 3–2 | 2–0 | 1–0 | 1–0 | 4–0 | 1–0 | 1–0 | 2–0 | 2–0 | 0–1 | | 2–0 | 3–0 |
| Ternana | 4–1 | 2–3 | 0–0 | 0–0 | 4–3 | 4–0 | 2–3 | 3–1 | 1–0 | 1–0 | 2–1 | 3–3 | 5–0 | 1–0 | 0–0 | 1–1 | | 2–1 |
| Torrese | 1–0 | 2–1 | 3–1 | 4–1 | 2–4 | 5–0 | 4–3 | 1–0 | 1–2 | 4–1 | 2–2 | 2–1 | 1–1 | 4–0 | 2–1 | 0–0 | 1–1 | |

Source: Almanacco Illustrato del Calcio - La Storia 1898-2004, Panini Edizioni, Modena, September 2005 (in Italian)
Legend: Blue = home team win; Yellow = draw; Red = away team win.

== References and sources ==
- Almanacco Illustrato del Calcio - La Storia 1898-2004, Panini Edizioni, Modena, September 2005
