= 1946–47 Serie C =

Italian football league season

The 1946–47 Serie C was the ninth edition of Serie C, the third highest league in the Italian football league system.

== Legend ==
Promoted
Relegated

== Northern Italy ==
Northern Italy sides were divided in nine rounds (gironi). The winners qualified to a tournament to determine the three teams promoted to 1947–48 Serie B.

=== Girone A ===
Liguria

Pos	Team	Pld	Pts
1	Sanremese	38	53
2	Entella	38	50
3	Rapallo Ruentes	38	47
4	Rivarolese	38	47
5	Speranza Savona	38	47
6	Sestri Levante	38	46
7	Cairese	38	42
8	Lavagnese	38	41
9	Pontedecimo	38	40
10	Vado	38	40
11	Alassio	38	37
12	Albenga	38	37
13	Bolzanetese Virtus	38	37
14	Varazze	38	35
15	Sarzanese	38	31
16	Corniglianese	38	29
17	Imperia	38	29
18	Ausonia Spezia	38	28
19	Tigullio	38	24
20	Intermelia	38	15

=== Girone B ===
Piedmont

Pos	Team	Pld	Pts
1	Asti	26	38
2	Fossanese	26	36
3	Volpianese	26	32
4	Cuneo	26	29
5	Ivrea	26	28
6	Acqui	26	28
7	Stella Alpina	26	26
8	Aosta	26	24
9	Saluzzo	26	23
10	Pinerolo	26	22
11	Saviglianese	26	22
12	Trinese	26	22
13	Monregalese (N)	26	21
14	Braidese (N)	26	12 (Note: 1 point deducted.)

(N) Relegated and later readmitted to Serie C.

=== Girone C ===
Western Lombardy

Pos	Team	Pld	Pts
1	Magenta	26	38
2	Parabiago	26	36
3	Luino	26	33
4	Verbania	26	33
5	Sommese	26	32
6	Saronno	26	27
7	Borgomanerese	26	26
8	Omegna	26	26
9	Rhodense	26	25
10	Juventus Domo	26	22
11	Gattinara	26	21
12	Biumense	26	21
13	Sparta Novara	26	15
14	Tradate	26	9
15	Calciatori Bustesi (Note: Retired during the championship.)	(15)	0

=== Girone D ===
Eastern Piedmont, southern Lombardy and Emilia

Pos	Team	Pld	Pts
1	Mortara	28	43
2	Fidentina	28	34
3	Abbiategrasso	28	34
4	Cilavegna (Note: Renounced to take to part to 1947–48 Serie C.)	28	33
5	Medese	28	33
6	Pavia	28	31
7	Sant'Angelo	28	29
8	Derthona	28	28
9	Stradellina	28	27
10	Olubra	28	26
11	Fiorenzuola	28	26
12	Casteggio	28	25
13	Ilva Novese	28	20
14	Bressana (N)	28	16
15	Robbio	28	15

(N) Relegated and later readmitted to Serie C.

=== Girone E ===
Northern Lombardy

Pos	Team	Pld	Pts
1	Monza	28	40
2	Pirelli	28	35
3	Pro Lissone	28	35
4	Sondrio	28	31
5	Caratese	28	29
6	Mariano Comense	28	29
7	Meda	28	29
8	Vimercatese	28	28
9	Tiranese	28	28
10	Falck	28	27
11	Vis Nova Giussano	28	26
12	Gerli Cusano Milanino (Note: Renounced to take to part to 1947–48 Serie C.)	28	23
13	Esperia-Fino Mornasco (N)	28	22
14	Cantù (N)	28	21
15	Breda	28	17

(N) Relegated and later readmitted to Serie C.

=== Girone F ===
Eastern Lombardy

Pos	Team	Pld	Pts
1	Vita Nova	28	42
2	Codogno	28	36
3	Pro Palazzolo Marzoli	28	35
4	Trevigliese	28	34
5	Chiari	28	31
6	Pro Romano	28	30
7	Bagnolese	28	29
8	Melzo	28	26
9	Falco Albino (Note: Renounced to take to part to 1947–48 Serie C.)	28	25
10	Orceana	28	24
11	Soresinese	28	23
12	Cassano d'Adda	28	19
13	Ardens (N)	28	19
14	Alzano	28	19
15	Melegnanese	28	43 (Note: Demoted to the last place and relegated for a sport illicit.)

(N) Relegated and later readmitted to Serie C.

=== Girone G ===
Western Veneto and Trentino-Alto Adige/Südtirol

Pos	Team	Pld	Pts
1	Bolzano	32	46
2	Sambonifacese	32	43
3	Marzotto	32	38
4	Merano	32	38
5	Villafranca	32	38
6	Cologna Veneta	32	36
7	Lanerossi Schio	32	35
8	Audace San Michele	32	34
9	Pellizzari Arzignano	32	31
10	Legnago	32	31
11	Thiene	32	30
12	Badia Polesine	32	30
13	Montagnana	32	26
14	Rovereto	32	24
15	Trento (N)	32	22
16	Brixen	32	22
17	Malo (N)	32	20
18	Lonigo	(25)	0 (Note: Lonigo was excluded from the championship because of incidents in the match with Cologna Veneta.)

(N) Relegated and later readmitted to Serie C.

=== Girone H ===
Eastern Veneto

Pos	Team	Pld	Pts
1	Montebelluna	30	50
2	Pro Mogliano	30	45
3	Giorgione	30	41
4	Vittorio Veneto	30	39
5	Sandonà	30	37
6	Pro Rovigo	30	33
7	Bassano	30	30
8	Dolo	30	27
9	Coneglianese	30	26
10	Belluno	30	26
11	Portogruarese	30	26
12	Pordenone	30	26
13	San Marco Venezia	30	25
14	Feltrese (N)	30	22
15	Clodia	30	19
16	Petrarca Padova	30	7 (Note: 1 point deducted.)

(N) Relegated and later readmitted to Serie C.

=== Girone I ===
Friuli-Venezia Giulia

Pos	Team	Pld	Pts
1	Edera	28	48
2	Pro Cervignano	28	38
3	Palmanova	28	36
4	Libertas Trieste	28	34
5	SAICI Torviscosa	28	34
6	Monfalconese	28	32
7	Sangiorgina	28	32
8	Itala Gradisca	28	29
9	Cividalese	28	28
10	Cormonese	28	26
11	Sant'Anna	28	25
12	Ronchi	32	22
13	Pieris	32	20
14	Sagrado	32	16
15	Ponziana (N)	32	−1 (Note: 3 points deducted.)

(N) Relegated and later readmitted to Serie C.

=== Finals ===
==== Girone A ====
Pos	Team	Pld	Pts
1	Magenta	4	3
2	Sanremese	4	2
3	Asti	4	1

==== Girone B ====
Pos	Team	Pld	Pts
1	Vita Nova	4	3
2	Mortara	4	2
3	Monza	4	1

==== Girone C ====
Pos	Team	Pld	Pts
1	Bolzano	4	5
2	Edera	4	3
3	Montebelluna	4	2

Bolzano, Meganta and Vita Nova promoted to 1947–48 Serie B.

== Central Italy ==
Central Italy sides were divided in six rounds (gironi). The winners qualified to a tournament to determine the two teams promoted to 1947–48 Serie B.

=== Girone A ===
Emilia

Pos	Team	Pld	Pts
1	Centese	26	36
2	Finale Emilia	26	34
3	Copparese	26	31
4	Panigale	26	30
5	Parma Vecchia	26	29
6	Pro Italia Correggio	26	28
7	G. Buscaroli Conselice	26	28
8	Mirandolese	26	25
9	Carpi	26	24
10	Gonzaga	26	21
11	Trancerie Mossina Guastalla	26	18
12	Crevalcore	26	17
13	Amatori Bologna	26	9
14	Bondenese (N)	26	0

(N) Relegated and later readmitted to Serie C.

=== Girone B ===
Umbria, Marche and Romagna

Pos	Team	Pld	Pts
1	Gubbio	26	35
2	Baracca Lugo	26	35
3	Vis Sauro Pesaro	26	30
4	Rimini	26	29
5	Vigor Senigallia	26	29
6	Jesi	26	29
7	Alma Juventus Fano	26	27
8	Forlimpopoli	26	27
9	Faenza	26	27
10	Riccione	26	24
11	Imolese F. Zardi	26	23
12	Sammaurese (N)	26	20
13	Edera Ravenna (N)	26	19
14	Urbino	26	10

(N) Relegated and later readmitted to Serie C.

=== Girone C ===
Northern Tuscany

Pos	Team	Pld	Pts
1	Massese	28	42
2	Signe	28	37
3	Tettora Cascina	28	36
4	Pontedera	28	33
5	S. Croce sull'Arno	28	32
6	Forte dei Marmi	28	31
7	Aglianese	28	30
8	Montecatini	28	25
9	Pontasserchio	28	25
10	Fucecchiese	28	24
11	Pietrasanta	28	24
12	Sestese	28	23
13	Monsummanese (N)	28	23
14	Lanciotto (N)	28	20
15	Audace Ponsacco (N)	28	15

(N) Relegated and later readmitted to Serie C.

=== Girone D ===
Southern Tuscany

Pos	Team	Pld	Pts
1	Grosseto	20	32
2	Piombino	20	25
3	Cecina	20	25
4	Arezzo	20	21
5	Orbetello	20	19
6	Poggibonsi	20	19
7	Sangiovannese	20	18
8	Aquila Montevarchi	20	18
9	Stella Rossa Livorno	20	17
10	Solvay Rosignano	20	16
11	Pro Firenze (N)	20	10

(N) Relegated and later readmitted to Serie C.

=== Girone E ===
Lazio and Umbria

Pos	Team	Pld	Pts
1	Civitacastellana	26	35
2	Virtus Spoleto	26	33
3	Sora	26	31
4	Civitavecchiese	26	30
5	Stefer Roma	26	29
6	A.L.M.A.S. Roma	26	29
7	L'Aquila	26	29
8	Forza e Coraggio	26	26
9	Tivoli	26	25
10	Viterbese	26	24
11	Ostiense O.M.I.	26	23
12	Poligrafico	26	21
13	Foligno	26	21
14	Trionfale	26	12 (Note: 2 points deducted.)

=== Girone F ===
Abruzzo and Marche

Pos	Team	Pld	Pts
1	Maceratese	26	43
2	Sambenedettese	26	42
3	Giulianova	26	28
4	Portocivitanovese	26	27
5	Sulmona	26	26
6	Chieti	26	25
7	Fermana	26	25
8	Teramo	26	24
9	Tolentino	26	23
10	Vastese	26	23
11	Portorecanati	26	22
12	Ascoli (N)	26	21
13	Sangiorgese	26	21
14	Fabriano	26	14

(N) Relegated and later readmitted to Serie C.

=== Final round ===
Pos	Team	Pld	Pts
1	Centese	10	12
2	Gubbio	10	11
3	Grosseto	10	11
4	Maceratese	10	11
5	Massese	10	8
6	Civitacastellana	10	6

== Southern Italy ==
Southern Italy sides were divided in three rounds (gironi). The winners and the runners-up qualified to a tournament to determine the sole team promoted to 1947–48 Serie B.

=== Girone A ===
Campania

Pos	Team	Pld	Pts
1	Nocerina	24	37
2	Turris	24	32
3	Afragolese	24	29
4	Stabia	24	29
5	Portici	24	29
6	Nola (Note: Financially relegated.)	24	26
7	Gragnano	24	23
8	Sangiuseppese	24	21
9	Angri	24	21
10	Ercolanese	24	20
11	Frattese	24	20
12	Bagnolese (Note: Re-admitted instead of Nola.)	24	18
13	Colombari	26	5
14	Polla (Note: Retired during the championship.)	–	0

=== Girone B ===
Apulia and Campania

Pos	Team	Pld	Pts
1	Benevento	26	41
2	Audace Monopoli	26	36
3	Avellino	26	35
4	Molfetta	26	28
5	Potenza	26	27 (Note: 1 point deducted.)
6	Castellana	26	26
7	San Ferdinando (Note: Renounced to take to part to 1947–48 Serie C.)	26	25
8	Incedit Foggia	26	24
9	Azzaretti Carbonara	26	24
10	Barletta	26	23
11	San Pietro Vernotico	26	21
12	Marimist Brindisi	26	21
13	Lucera	26	19
14	Trani	26	11
15	Baldassarre (Note: Retired during the championship.)	–	0

=== Girone C ===
Calabria and Sicily

Pos	Team	Pld	Pts
1	Giostra Messina	20	32
2	Messina	20	28 (Note: Promoted after tie-breaker: Messina-Reggina 4-1, Messina-Crotone 1-1, Reggina-Crotone 2-0)
3	Reggina	20	28
4	Crotone	20	28
5	Villese (Note: Financially relegated.)	20	24
6	Catania	20	20
7	Acireale	20	17
8	Termini Imerese	20	13
9	Marsala	20	11 (Note: 3 points deducted.)
10	Drepanum (Note: Re-admitted instead of Villese.)	20	10
11	Comunale Siracusano	20	0

=== Final round ===
Pos	Team	Pld	Pts
1	Nocerina	10	13 (Note: Nocerina promoted after tie-breaker: Nocerina-Audace Monopoli 4-1)
2	Audace Monopoli	10	13
3	Turris	10	12
4	Giostra Messina (Note: Merged with Messina after this season.)	10	11
5	Messina	10	6
6	Benevento	10	3 (Note: 2 points deducted.)
