= Serie C =

Italian association football league

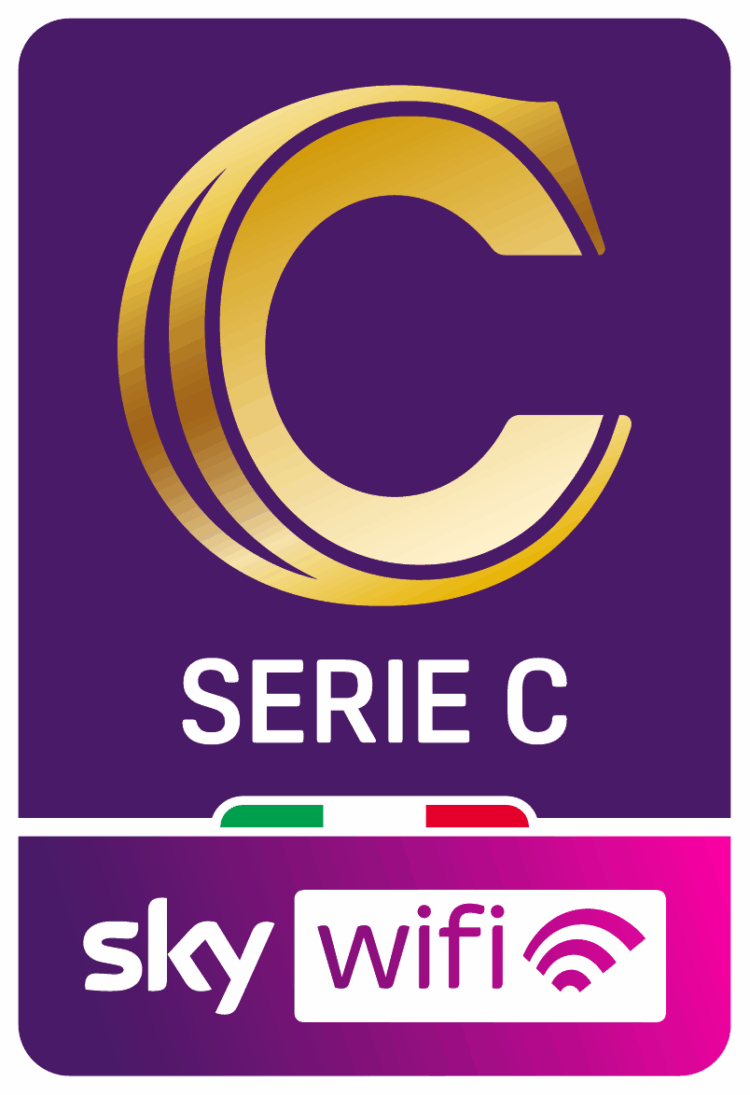
- Organising body: Lega Italiana Calcio Professionistico
- Founded: 1935; 91 years ago (Note: Refounded in 2014 in a single group as Lega Pro; renamed in 2017 as Serie C.)
- Country: Italy
- Confederation: UEFA
- Divisions: 3
- Number of clubs: 60
- Level on pyramid: 3
- Promotion to: Serie B
- Relegation to: Serie D
- Domestic cup: Coppa Italia
- League cup(s): Supercoppa di Serie C Coppa Italia Serie C
- Current champions: Vicenza (Group A); Arezzo (Group B); Benevento (Group C) (2025–26)
- Most championships: Prato (6 titles)
- Broadcasters: Sky Sport; Now; Rai Sport; FIFA+ (outside Italy)
- Sponsor: Sky Wifi
- Website: lega-pro.com
- Current: 2026–27 Serie C

The Serie C (Italian pronunciation: [ˈsɛːrje (t)ˈtʃi]), officially known as Serie C Sky Wifi for sponsorship purposes, is the third-highest division in the Italian football league system after Serie B and Serie A. The Lega Italiana Calcio Professionistico (Lega Pro) is the governing body that operates the Serie C.

The unification of the Lega Pro Prima Divisione and the Lega Pro Seconda Divisione as Lega Pro Divisione Unica (often also abbreviated as Lega Pro) in 2014 reintroduced the format of the original Serie C that existed between 1935 and 1978 (before the split into Serie C1 and Serie C2). In May 2017, the Lega Pro assembly unanimously approved renaming the competition to its original name, Serie C.

== History ==
A third division above the regional leagues was first created in Italy in 1926, when fascist authorities decided to reform the major championships on a national basis, increasing the number of teams participating by promoting many regional teams from the Third Division (Terza Divisione) to the Second Division (Seconda Divisione).

A new league running this Second Division, the Direttorio Divisioni Inferiori Nord (Northern Directory of Lower Divisions) was set up in Genoa, while football activity in the southern part of the country was run by the Direttorio Divisioni Inferiori Sud which later became the Direttorio Meridionale (Southern Directory). These leagues did not last long; after another reform they were disbanded between 1930 and 1931. Some bigger clubs who owned large pitches with dimensions of 100x60 metres were promoted to the First Division (Prima Divisione); a league defined and structured as the "National Championship".

The Second Division had no relegations to regional leagues as most teams were reelected at the beginning of each new season. Once a critical threshold was reached, the Italian federation decided to close the two leagues and move all teams to the "Direttori Regionali" (Regional Committees) so that the labour-intensive job of organisation was delegated to more efficient and organised regional staff.

The most successful teams coming from the Second Divisions in 5 years (from 1926–27 to 1930–31) formed six ever-growing sections of the First Division (Prima Divisione) which at the beginning had just a few teams in just one section from southern Italy.

This championship was organized by the same league governing Serie A and Serie B (the "Direttorio Divisioni Superiori"), although, unlike the two higher divisions, it was structured in local groups with geographical criteria. The number of clubs belonging to the Prima Divisione continued to increase every year, until FIGC decided to rename it Serie C (at the beginning of the 1935–36 season) while a subsequent large reduction in 1948 led to the creation of a sole national division in 1952–53.

The reform that created the current league was decided by Bruno Zauli in 1959 as he built on the incomplete work started by the former president Ottorino Barassi to make professional football fully recognised and organised. While Lega Calcio had a stated mission of organising professional and national divisions, the new Lega Nazionale Semiprofessionisti based in Florence had to regulate the two semiprofessional and subnational divisions: Serie C and Serie D, with the first one adopting a format of three groups of 20 teams each. In 1978 the semiprofessional sector was abolished; Serie D became an amateur section while Serie C was divided into two professional divisions (Serie C1 and Serie C2), and the league changed its name to Lega Professionisti Serie C. On 20 June 2008, the league was restructured and took its current name Lega Italiana Calcio Professionistico.

After the league reform of 2014, the two previous divisions of Lega Pro Prima Divisione and Lega Pro Seconda Divisione were ultimately merged into a new league; the Lega Pro Divisione Unica more informally known simply as Lega Pro. This is the league structure currently in operation; comprising 60 teams that are divided geographically in three groups of 20 each. At the end of each season, four teams are promoted to Serie B (three group winners, plus one coming from a promotion playoff involving the three group runners-up). Meanwhile, nine teams are relegated to Serie D: the last-placed team from each group goes down directly, whereas teams placed between 16th and 19th in each group play a relegation playoff (officially referred to as play-out), with the two losing teams from each group also relegated.

In May 2017, the Lega Pro assembly unanimously approved the return to the original name Serie C. The 2017–18 Serie C season included 19 teams in each of the three divisions after adjustments were made for excluded clubs.

== Format ==
Serie C is composed of 60 teams divided equally into three groups split horizontally in geographical terms, from north to south. During the regular season, teams play in a round-robin format solely within their group, with the two halves of the season having exactly the same order of fixtures. Three points are awarded for a win, one for a draw and none for a loss. At the end of the regular season one table per group is determined, based on points. If two or more teams are tied on points, the following tie-breaking criteria apply:

1. Head-to-head points;
2. Head-to-head goal difference;
3. Goal difference;
4. Goals scored;
5. Lower goals against;
6. Wins;
7. Lower losses;
8. Away wins;
9. Lower home losses.

A total of 4 teams are promoted to Serie B and 9 teams are relegated to Serie D. The winning team of each group is directly promoted and qualifies for Supercoppa di Serie C. Teams which have finished in the bottom of the league are directly relegated. The other divisional changes are determined through a complex system of promotion and relegation play-offs.

=== Promotion play-offs ===
Logo 2020–23

28 teams compete to achieve the only available spot for Serie B. 27 of them are the teams which have finished in the 2nd to 10th positions (9 per group). The 28th team is the winner of Coppa Italia Serie C. There are a total of six rounds:

- First round. Fixtures pair the 5th v 10th, 6th v 9th and 7th v 8th-placed teams;
- Second round. Fixtures pair the 4th v the worst-placed team and the best-placed team v the 2nd best-placed team from the previous round.

First round and Second round consist in single-leg games and, if teams are tied after regular time, the higher-placed team advances. 6 teams (2 per group) advance to the next round.

- Third round. The three 3rd-placed teams, Coppa Italia Serie C winner and the best-placed team from the previous round are seeded. Fixtures are drawn;
- Quarter-finals. The three 2nd-placed teams and the best-placed team from the previous round are seeded. Fixtures are drawn.

Third round and Quarter-finals consist in two-legged games, with the seeded team playing at home for the second leg, and, if teams are tied on aggregate, the seeded team advances. The four winning teams reach the Final four, composed of:

- Semi-finals;
- Final.

Final four fixtures are drawn, all games are two-legged and, if teams are tied on aggregate, the winner is decided by extra-time and a penalty shootout if required.

In order to determine the best-placed team, the following criteria apply:

1. League position;
2. Points;
3. Wins;
4. Goals scored;
5. Draw.

Phase	Round	Clubs remaining	Clubs involved	From previous round	Entries in this round	Teams entering at this round
Group phase	First round	28	18	none	18	Teams in the 5th to 10th positions
Group phase	Second round	19	12	9	3	4th-placed teams
National phase	Third round	13	10	6	4	3rd-placed teams and Coppa Italia Serie C winner
National phase	Quarter-finals	8	8	5	3	2nd-placed teams
Final four	Semi-finals	4	4	4	none	
Final four	Final	2	2	2	none	

If the winner of Coppa Italia Serie C:

1. finishes in the top three, qualifies for the relegation play-offs, is relegated directly, or just declines to participate, its spot goes to the runners-up or, subordinately, if they meet the same requirements, to the 4th-placed team playing in the same group as the winner. Thus, the 5th-placed team advances automatically to the Second round and faces the worst-placed team from the First round, whose fixtures now pair the 6th v 11th, 7th v 10th and 8th v 9th-placed teams;
2. finishes in the 4th to 10th positions, the 11th-placed team playing in the same group qualifies for the First round. Fixtures of the First round and Second round still respect the order of the seven participating teams as seen before, with the best-placed team (that can be the 4th or 5th-placed team if Coppa Italia Serie C winner finished 4th) entering the Second round and facing the worst-placed team among the other six which play the First round;
3. gives its spot to the runners-up and they finish in the 4th to 10th positions, the 11th-placed team playing in the same group as the runners-up qualifies for the First round (for fixtures see the point 2).

=== Relegation play-offs ===
The number of teams that play the relegation playoffs, usually referred to as play-out in Italian, can vary. Usually, fixtures pair the 16th v 19th and 17th vs 18th-placed teams. Matches are two-legged, the higher-placed team plays at home for second leg and, if teams are tied on aggregate, the lower-placed team is relegated to Serie D. However, if the higher-placed team finishes nine or more points ahead of the lower-placed team, play-out is cancelled and the team is relegated directly.

=== Reserve teams ===
Reserve teams of Serie A clubs may be admitted to Serie C, subject to the applicable FIGC regulations. A reserve team may be promoted to Serie B, but it cannot compete in the same division as its senior team or in a higher division. If the senior team and reserve team would otherwise compete in the same league, the reserve team must play in the division below.

== Homegrown players ==
To encourage the development of homegrown players, all Lega Pro clubs were capped to use no more than 16 players in their squads that were older than 23 years of age (in 2019–20 season, player born before 1 January 1997), plus two wildcards for long serving players of the clubs. The clubs could use an unlimited number of under-23 players.

== Clubs ==
=== 2026–27 teams ===
==== Group A (North) ====
11 teams from Lombardy, 4 teams from Veneto, 3 teams from Piedmont, 1 team from Emilia-Romagna and 1 team from Trentino-Alto Adige/Südtirol.

Location of teams in 2026–27 Serie C (Group A)
Location of teams in 2026–27 Serie C (Group A) (Lombardy)

Club	City	Stadium	Capacity
AlbinoLeffe	Albino and Leffe	AlbinoLeffe Stadium (Zanica)	1,791
Alcione Milano	Milan	Ernesto Breda (Sesto San Giovanni)	3,523
Arzignano Valchiampo	Arzignano	Tommaso Dal Molin	1,690
Carpi	Carpi	Sandro Cabassi	5,510
Cittadella	Cittadella	Piercesare Tombolato	7,623
Desenzano	Desenzano del Garda	Comunale Gino Corioni (Ospitaletto)	9,000
Dolomiti Bellunesi	Belluno, Feltre and Sedico	Zugni Tauro (Feltre)	1,700
Folgore Caratese	Carate Brianza	XXV Aprile	1,450
Giana Erminio	Gorgonzola	Città di Gorgonzola	3,766
Juventus Next Gen	Turin	Giuseppe Moccagatta (Alessandria)	5,827
Lecco	Lecco	Rigamonti-Ceppi	5,508
Lumezzane	Lumezzane	Tullio Saleri	4,150
Novara	Novara	Silvio Piola (Novara)	17,875
Ospitaletto	Ospitaletto	Comunale Gino Corioni	9,000
Pergolettese	Crema	Giuseppe Voltini	4,095
Pro Vercelli	Vercelli	Silvio Piola (Vercelli)	5,526
Renate	Renate	XXV Aprile (Carate Brianza)	1,450
Trento	Trento	Briamasco	3,000
Treviso	Treviso	Omobono Tenni	10,000
Union Brescia	Brescia	Mario Rigamonti	19,550

==== Group B (Centre) ====
3 teams from Emilia-Romagna, 3 teams from Lazio, 3 teams from Tuscany, 2 teams from Abruzzo, 2 teams from Liguria, 2 teams from Marche, 2 teams from Umbria, 1 team from Lombardy, 1 team from Molise and 1 team from Sardinia.

Location of teams in 2026–27 Serie C (Group B)

Club	City	Stadium	Capacity
Atalanta U23	Bergamo	Comunale di Caravaggio (Caravaggio)	2,180
Campobasso	Campobasso	Antonio Molinari	25,000
Forlì	Forlì	Tullo Morgagni	3,500
Grosseto	Grosseto	Carlo Zecchini	9,779
Gubbio	Gubbio	Pietro Barbetti	4,939
Guidonia Montecelio	Guidonia Montecelio	Comunale di Guidonia Montecelio	2,900
Latina	Latina	Domenico Francioni	9,310
Livorno	Livorno	Armando Picchi	14,312
Ostia Mare	Ostia, Rome	Pasquale Giannattasio	1,500
Pescara	Pescara	Stadio Adriatico – Giovanni Cornacchia	20,476
Perugia	Perugia	Renato Curi	23,625
Pianese	Piancastagnaio	Comunale di Piancastagnaio	1,500
Pineto	Pineto	Pavone-Mariani	1,500
Ravenna	Ravenna	Bruno Benelli	12,020
Reggiana	Reggio Emilia	MAPEI Stadium - Città del Tricolore	21,525
Sambenedettese	San Benedetto del Tronto	Riviera delle Palme	13,786
Spezia	La Spezia	Stadio Alberto Picco	12,273
Torres	Sassari	Vanni Sanna	6,145
Vado	Vado Ligure	Giuseppe Sivori (Sestri Levante)	1,500
Vis Pesaro	Pesaro	Tonino Benelli	4,898

==== Group C (South) ====
7 teams from Apulia, 7 teams from Campania, 2 teams from Basilicata, 2 teams from Calabria, 1 team from Lombardy and 1 team from Sicily.

Location of teams in 2026–27 Serie C (Group C)
Location of teams in 2026–27 Serie C (Group C) (Campania and Basilicata)

Club	City	Stadium	Capacity
Altamura	Altamura	Antonio D'Angelo	2,800
Audace Cerignola	Cerignola	Domenico Monterisi	7,453
Bari	Bari	San Nicola	58,270
Barletta	Barletta	Cosimo Puttilli	10,000
Casarano	Casarano	Giuseppe Capozza	6,500
Casertana	Caserta	Alberto Pinto	12,000
Catania	Catania	Angelo Massimino	20,881
Cavese	Cava de' Tirreni	Simonetta Lamberti	5,200
Cosenza	Cosenza	San Vito-Gigi Marulla	20,987
Crotone	Crotone	Ezio Scida	16,640
Foggia	Foggia	Pino Zaccheria	25,085
Giugliano	Giugliano in Campania	Alberto De Cristofaro	6,030
Inter Milan U23	Milan	Ernesto Breda (Sesto San Giovanni)	3,523
Monopoli	Monopoli	Vito Simone Veneziani	6,880
Picerno	Picerno	Donato Curcio	1,600
Potenza	Potenza	Alfredo Viviani	4,977
Salernitana	Salerno	Stadio Arechi	20,194
Savoia	Torre Annunziata	Alfredo Giraud	10,750
Scafatese	Scafati	Giovanni Vitiello	2,650
Sorrento	Sorrento	Italia	3,600

=== Seasons in Serie C ===
This is the complete list of the clubs that took part in the 38 Serie C seasons played from the 1935–36 season until the 1977–78 season (participation in the editions of the 1945–46, 1946–47 and 1947–48 seasons, championships that due to World War II, are excluded from the list as they were divided into two completely independent leagues), the three Lega Pro seasons played from the 2014–15 season until the 2016–17 season, and from the 2017–18 season. The teams in bold competed in Serie C in the 2021–22 season.

- **35** times: Lecce
- **33** times: **Piacenza**
- **31** times: Cosenza
- **30** times: **Prato**
- **29** times: Cremonese, Empoli, Salernitana, **Siracusa**, Treviso
- **28** times: Biellese, Rimini
- **27** times: **Ravenna**
- **26** times: Ancona, **Arezzo**, Legnano
- **25** times: Savona, **Siena**
- **24** times: **Mestre**, **Sambenedettese**
- **23** times: Mantova, **Pistoiese**
- **22** times: **Casertana**, Chieti, Crotone, Lecco, Maceratese, **Trapani**
- **21** times: Parma, **Reggina**
- **20** times: Forlì, Grosseto, **Lucchese**, Pescara, Pro Patria, Sanremese, Taranto
- **19** times: Ascoli, **Carrarese**, Casale, L'Aquila, **Livorno**, Marzotto, **Pisa**, Seregno, Spezia, Udinese
- **18** times: Foggia, Pro Vercelli, **Reggiana**
- **17** times: **Alessandria**, Barletta, Entella, Marsala, Potenza
- **16** times: **Juve Stabia**, Messina, **Monza**, Pavia, Torres, Varese, Venezia, Vigevano
- **15** times: Brindisi, **Catanzaro**, Monfalcone, Perugia, **Pontedera**
- **14** times: Avellino, Benevento, **Padova**, Savoia
- **13** times: Bolzano, Cesena, Como, Gallaratese, Massese, **Matera**, Rapallo, SPAL
- **12** times: **Akragas**, Crema, Jesi, **Fano**, **Olbia**, **Pordenone**, Pro Gorizia, Sestrese, Solbiatese, Trento, **Triestina**, Vis Pesaro
- **11** times: Asti, Carbosarda, **Catania**, Derthona, Fanfulla, **Teramo**, Ternana
- **10** times: Acireale, Carpi, Montevarchi, Omegna, Signa,
- **9** times: Baracca Lugo, Cagliari, Molfetta, Ponziana, Rovigo, Trani, Vastese, Viareggio
- **8** times: **Bisceglie**, Civitavecchia, Falck, Forlimpopoli, Giulianova, Grion Pola, Ilva Bagnolese, Piombino, Sangiovannese, Sorrento
- **7** times: Acqui, Audace, Bari, Clodia Sottomarina, **Cuneo**, Fiumana, **Gubbio**, Imolese, Imperia, Ivrea, Nocerina, Novara, Saronno, Turris, Verbania
- **6** times: Ampelea, **Bassano Virtus**, Belluno, Caratese, Latina, MATER, Modena, **Paganese**, Pontedecimo, Ponte San Pietro, Rivarolese, Rovereto, Tevere Roma, Vittorio Veneto, **Vicenza**, **Viterbese**
- **5** times: Andrea Doria, Cantù, Foligno, Frosinone, Juventus Domo, Palazzolo, Pinerolo, Pro Lissone, Redaelli Rogoredo, Riccione, Rosignano Solvay, San Donà, Schio, Trevigliese, Vado
- **4** times: Alba Roma, **AlbinoLeffe**, Alfa Romeo, Battipagliese, Cavese, Cecina, Città di Castello, Colleferro, Edera Trieste, **FeralpiSalò**, **Fermana**, Fossanese, Fucecchio, **Giana Erminio**, **Pro Piacenza**, Internapoli, Manfredonia, Martina Franca, Massiminiana, Monsummanese, Nardò, Nissa, Orbetello, Pirelli, **Renate**, Sant'Angelo, **Santarcangelo**, Saviglianese, SIAI Marchetti, **Südtirol**, Suzzara, Toma Maglie
- **3** times: Albenga, Aosta, Armando Casalini, Arsenale Venezia, Campobasso, Cerignola, Cirio, Civitanovese, **Fidelis Andria**, Forte dei Marmi, Gerli, Igea Virtus, Juventus Siderno, Libertas Trieste, Lumezzane, Lupa Roma, Meda, Melfi, Molinella, **Monopoli**, Mortara, Palmese, Parabiago, Pieris, Rieti, Scafatese, SIME Popoli, Tuttocuoio, Villasanta, Vogherese
- **2** times: Agrigento, Ala Littoria, Albese, Amatori Bologna, Breda, Bondenese, Cinzano, Codogno, Dipendenti Municipali La Spezia, Enna, FEDIT, **Fondi**, Galliate, Ischia Isolaverde, Lanciano, Luino, Magenta, Novese, Panigale, Pergocrema, Pietro Resta, Pro Italia, Racing Roma, Rizzoli, Sora, Sparta Novara, Tivoli, Varazze, Verona, **Virtus Francavilla**, VV.FF. Palermo, VV.FF. Roma
- **1** time: 94º Reparto Reggimento Distrettuale, Abbiategrasso, Alcamo, Andreanelli, Ardens, A.R.S.A., **Arzachena**, Aullese, Aversa Normanna, Avio Calcio, Avio Squadra, Aviosicula Palermo, Brescia, Budrio, Cantiere Tosi, Caproni, Centese, Centrale del Latte di Genova, Chinotto Neri, Cittadella, Corniglianese, Cossatese, Cynthia, FIAT Torino, Fortitudo Trieste, Gavinovese, **Gavorrano**, Genoa, Giovinezza, Guastalla, Ilva Savona, Isotta Fraschini, Juve Pomigliano, Juventina Palermo, Lanciotto, Legnago, Luparense, Magazzini Generali, Marzotto Manerbio, Melzo, Mirandolese, Mogliano, Montebelluna, Palermo-Juventina, Pellizzari Arzignano, Pro Enna, Pro San Giorgio, Pro Sesto, Ragusa, Real Vicenza, R.S.T. Littorio, San Marino, Sebinia, Sestri Levante, Settimese, **Sicula Leonzio**, Tenente Mario Passamonte, Torviscosa, Ventimigliese, Vigor Lamezia, Villafranca, Vincenzo Benini, Virtus Spoleto, Vis Nova, Vittorio Necchi, Vibonese.

== Domestic broadcasting rights ==
Season	Pay-TV rights	Free-to-air rights
2014-2015	―	Sportube
2015-2016	―	Sportube
2016-2017	Sportube	―
2017-2018	Eleven Sports; DAZN; OneFootball (5 matches per round)	Local broadcasters Rai and Sportitalia (one match each)
2018-2019	Eleven Sports; DAZN; OneFootball (5 matches per round)	Local broadcasters Rai and Sportitalia (one match each)
2019-2020	Eleven Sports; DAZN; OneFootball (5 matches per round)	Local broadcasters Rai and Sportitalia (one match each)
2020-2021	Eleven Sports; DAZN; OneFootball (5 matches per round)	Local broadcasters Rai and Sportitalia (one match each)
2021-2022	Eleven Sports; DAZN; OneFootball (5 matches per round)	Local broadcasters Rai and Sportitalia (one match each)
2022-2023	Eleven Sports; DAZN; OneFootball (5 matches per round)	Local broadcasters Rai and Sportitalia (one match each)
2023-2024	Sky	Rai (48 co-exclusive matches, play-offs and play-outs)
2024-2025	Sky	Rai (48 co-exclusive matches, play-offs and play-outs)
2025-2026	Sky	Rai (48 co-exclusive matches, play-offs and play-outs)
2026-2027	Sky	Rai (48 co-exclusive matches, play-offs and play-outs)
2027-2028	Sky	Rai (48 co-exclusive matches, play-offs and play-outs)

== Champions ==
For Serie C1 and Lega Pro Prima Divisione winners, see Lega Pro Prima Divisione and for Serie C2 and Lega Pro Seconda Divisione winners, see Lega Pro Seconda Divisione between 1978–79 and 2013–14

Serie C

- 1935–36 – Venezia, Cremonese, Spezia, Catanzaro
- 1936–37 – Padova, Vigevano, Sanremese, Anconitana, Taranto
- 1937–38 – SPAL, Fanfulla Lodi, Casale, Siena, Salernitana
- 1938–39 – Brescia, Catania
- 1939–40 – Reggiana, Vicenza, Maceratese
- 1940–41 – Prato, Fiumana
- 1941–42 – Cremonese, Juventina Palermo
- 1942–43 – Varese, Pro Gorizia
- 1943–45 – no national competition due to World War II
- 1945–46 – Mestrina, Prato, Perugia, Alba Ala Roma, Benevento, Lecce, Leone Palermo
- 1946–47 – Magenta, Vita Nova P.S. Pietro, Bolzano, Centese, Nocerina
- 1947–48 – competed amongst 18 regional leagues, no promotion to Serie B, no overall champions
- 1948–49 – Fanfulla Lodi, Udinese, Prato, Avellino
- 1949–50 – Seregno, Treviso, Anconitana, Messina
- 1950–51 – Monza, Marzotto Valdagno, Piombino, Juve Stabia
- 1951–52 – Cagliari
- 1952–53 – Pavia
- 1953–54 – Parma
- 1954–55 – Bari
- 1955–56 – Venezia
- 1956–57 – Prato
- 1957–58 – Reggiana
- 1958–59 – OZO Mantova, Catanzaro
- 1959–60 – Pro Patria, Prato, Foggia
- 1960–61 – Modena, Lucchese, Cosenza
- 1961–62 – Triestina, Cagliari, Foggia
- 1962–63 – Varese, Prato, Potenza
- 1963–64 – Reggiana, Livorno, Trani
- 1964–65 – Novara, Pisa, Reggina
- 1965–66 – Savona, Arezzo, Salernitana
- 1966–67 – Monza, Perugia, Bari
- 1967–68 – Como, Cesena, Ternana
- 1968–69 – Piacenza, Arezzo, Casertana
- 1969–70 – Novara, Massese, Casertana
- 1970–71 – Reggiana, Genoa, Sorrento
- 1971–72 – Lecco, Ascoli, Brindisi
- 1972–73 – Parma, SPAL, Avellino
- 1973–74 – Alessandria, Sambenedettese, Pescara
- 1974–75 – Piacenza, Modena, Catania
- 1975–76 – Monza, Rimini, Lecce
- 1976–77 – Cremonese, Pistoiese, Bari
- 1977–78 – Udinese, SPAL, Nocerina

Lega Pro

- 2014–15 – Novara, Teramo (stripped of title due to match fixing, awarded to Ascoli), Salernitana
- 2015–16 – Cittadella, SPAL, Benevento
- 2016–17 – Cremonese, Venezia, Foggia

Serie C

- 2017–18 – Livorno, Padova, Lecce
- 2018–19 – Virtus Entella, Pordenone, Juve Stabia
- 2019–20 – Monza, Vicenza, Reggina
- 2020–21 – Como, Perugia, Ternana
- 2021–22 – Südtirol, Modena, Bari
- 2022–23 – Feralpisalò, Reggiana, Catanzaro
- 2023–24 – Mantova, Cesena, Juve Stabia
- 2024–25 – Padova, Virtus Entella, Avellino
