= 1944 Campionato Alta Italia =

Football championship of the Italian Social Republic

The 1944 Divisione Nazionale, better known as Campionato Alta Italia was a football championship organized by the Italian Social Republic and disputed in Northern and Central Italy in 1944 among Serie A and Serie B teams plus others.

The tournament was won by Spezia, and officially recognized as an "honorary" title by the Italian Football Federation (FIGC) only in 2002, following a long dispute. Following the decision of FIGC in 2002, Spezia is authorized by the Italian Federation to exhibit a tricolour badge on the official jerseys which is unique, being the only example of a permanent one in Italy. The badge has a different shape and size compared to the ordinary Scudetto.

== Background ==
Following the American liberation of Tunisia and later Sicily in 1943, Italy suffered heavy bombings by the Allied Powers. The consequent multiple damages on railways and streets imposed to the FIGC to plan a special mixed championship for the 1943–44 season, with three different regional groups to reduce the teams movements. However, at the eve of his dismissal, Benito Mussolini suspended all sport activities.

After Italy defeat in World War II, with the country divided by the "Gothic Line", the Italian Football Federation split in two: while the official FIGC remained in the south, under the rule by the Kingdom of Italy, the northern FIGC, ruled by the Italian Social Republic, moved its headquarters to Milan and organized a "campionato di divisione nazionale misto" (mixed national division championship). The so-called Campionato Alta Italia (High Italy Championship) was the only Italian championship organized on a more than regional basis: in Central and Southern Italy many regional championship were held. Originally, the Roman Championship won by Lazio was part of the Alta Italia qualifications, but the Liberation of Rome changed the plan.

The Spezia players had to obtain the status of Firefighters from the La Spezia local command in order to be able to play football games traveling to other cities, as freedom of movement was restricted during war time in Italy. Similarly, Torino Calcio players were allowed to move freely and play football carrying FIAT documents. In 1944 the Grande Torino, similarly to Spezia as VVFF, participated with the denomination Torino FIAT.

In the northern FIGC's original plans, the winning team in the tournament would have been recognized as Champion of Italy; however; after the end of the championship, a statement from the northern Federation, following political pressure, announced that Spezia wouldn't be awarded the "Scudetto" title. Only in 2002 the Spezia title was officially recognised by FIGC as a decoration.

Following the decision of FIGC in 2002, Spezia Calcio is authorized by the Italian Federation to exhibit a tricolour badge on the official jerseys which is unique, being the only example of a permanent one in Italy. The badge has a different shape and size compared to the ordinary Scudetto.

== Qualifications ==
=== Piedmont and Liguria ===
==== Standings ====
Pos	Team	Pld	W	D	L	GF	GA	GD	Pts	Qualification
1	Torino FIAT	18	16	2	0	78	19	+59	34	Qualified
2	Juventus Cisitalia	18	12	3	3	44	25	+19	27	Qualified
3	Biellese	18	12	0	6	44	32	+12	24	
4	Liguria	18	10	3	5	40	25	+15	23	
5	Genova 1893	18	9	2	7	34	31	+3	20	
6	Novara	18	8	1	9	28	33	−5	17	
7	Asti	18	5	3	10	21	36	−15	13	
8	Casale	18	4	2	12	20	37	−17	10	
8	Alessandria	18	4	2	12	13	46	−33	10	
10	Cuneo	18	1	0	17	8	46	−38	2	

==== Results ====
Home \ Away	ALE	AST	BIE	CSL	CUN	GEN	JUV	LIG	NOV	TOR
Alessandria		1–3	0–4	1–0	2–0	0–2	2–2	0–0	1–0	0–4
Asti	0–1		2–3	0–1	3–2	1–3	0–2	0–0	4–2	0–4
Biellese	5–1	3–0		4–3	2–0	3–1	1–2	5–4	3–2	1–2
Casale	2–0	0–2	0–2		2–0	0–2	0–2	2–4	2–2	1–4
Cuneo	3–2	0–2	0–2	0–2		0–3	0–2	0–2	0–2	0–3
Genova 1893	3–0	1–1	1–2	2–0	3–2		2–0	1–3	2–1	4–4
Juventus Cisitalia	4–0	2–2	3–2	5–1	6–1	3–1		4–3	2–0	0–0
Liguria	4–1	4–0	2–0	0–0	2–0	2–1	4–3		1–0	1–2
Novara	3–1	1–0	2–1	2–0	2–0	2–1	1–2	3–2		1–3
Torino FIAT	7–0	6–1	7–1	5–4	4–0	7–1	5–0	3–2	8–2	

Source: Almanacco Illustrato del Calcio - La Storia 1898-2004, Panini Edizioni, Modena, September 2005 (in Italian)
Legend: Blue = home team win; Yellow = draw; Red = away team win.

=== Lombardy ===
==== Standings ====
Pos	Team	Pld	W	D	L	GF	GA	GD	Pts	Qualification
1	Ambrosiana-Inter	14	10	1	3	30	13	+17	21	Qualified
2	Varese	14	6	4	4	26	20	+6	16	Tie-breaker
3	Brescia	14	7	2	5	24	20	+4	16	Tie-breaker
4	Fanfulla	14	5	5	4	17	17	0	15	
5	Milano	14	5	3	6	18	16	+2	13	
5	Pro Patria	14	4	5	5	12	14	−2	13	
7	Cremonese	14	3	4	7	13	24	−11	10	
8	Atalanta	14	3	2	9	12	28	−16	8	

==== Results ====
Home \ Away	AMB	ATA	BRE	CRE	FAN	MIL	PPA	VAR
Ambrosiana-Inter		2–1	8–2	3–1	3–1	0–2	2–0	3–0
Atalanta	1–2		3–2	2–0	0–0	0–2	1–0	1–4
Brescia	0–1	1–0		0–0	4–1	1–0	1–1	4–1
Cremonese	1–2	2–1	0–4		1–1	0–0	3–0	1–1
Fanfulla	2–1	3–1	0–1	1–0		3–1	1–0	1–1
Milano	1–3	6–0	3–2	0–2	1–0		1–1	0–0
Pro Patria	0–0	1–1	2–1	2–0	0–0	2–0		3–1
Varese	1–0	3–0	0–1	7–2	3–3	2–1	2–0	

Source: Almanacco Illustrato del Calcio - La Storia 1898-2004, Panini Edizioni, Modena, September 2005 (in Italian)
Legend: Blue = home team win; Yellow = draw; Red = away team win.

Tie-breaker

Team 1	Score	Team 2
Brescia (Italy)	0-1(aet)	(Italy) Varese

Varese advanced to the semifinals

=== Veneto ===
==== Group A ====
Standings

Pos	Team	Pld	W	D	L	GF	GA	GD	Pts	Qualification
1	Venezia	12	10	0	2	43	12	+31	20	Qualified
2	Treviso	12	8	1	3	36	11	+25	16 (Note: 1 point deducted?)	Qualified
2	Padova	12	8	0	4	27	18	+9	16	
4	Bassano	12	6	0	6	22	31	−9	12	
5	Mestre	12	1	5	6	10	21	−11	7	
6	Legnago	12	2	2	8	19	35	−16	6	
6	Rovigo	12	2	2	8	9	38	−29	6	

Notes:

Results

Home \ Away	BAS	LGN	MST	PAD	ROV	TRV	VEN
Bassano		4–1	1–0	0–3	5–2	0–7	0–1
Legnago	1–4		1–1	3–1	6–0	1–4	0–3
Mestre	0–2	2–2		0–2	0–0	1–1	1–2
Padova	7–2	7–1	2–1		1–0	1–3	2–0
Rovigo	0–1	3–2	1–1	0–1		2–0	1–3
Treviso	2–1	2–0	5–0	3–0	7–0		1–3
Venezia	7–2	4–1	2–3	5–0	11–0	2–1	

Source: Almanacco Illustrato del Calcio - La Storia 1898-2004, Panini Edizioni, Modena, September 2005 (in Italian)
Legend: Blue = home team win; Yellow = draw; Red = away team win.

==== Group B ====
Pos	Team	Pld	W	D	L	GF	GA	GD	Pts	Qualification
1	Vicenza	10	8	1	1	32	7	+25	17	Qualified
2	Verona	10	5	3	2	18	15	+3	13	Qualified
3	Lanerossi Schio	10	5	2	3	16	16	0	12	
4	DAM Valdagno	10	5	1	4	15	15	0	10 (Note: 1 point deducted.)	
5	Monti Padova	10	1	1	8	12	31	−19	3	
6	Sambonifacese	10	1	2	7	16	25	−9	2 (Note: 2 points deducted.)	
7	Audace San Michele	2	0	0	2	1	7	−6	0	Withdrew (Note: Audace San Michele and Pellizzari Arzignano withdrew during the championship. All their matches were invalidated.)
7	Pellizzari Arzignano	2	0	0	2	1	8	−7	0	Withdrew

Notes:

Results

Home \ Away	ASM	DAM	LAN	MON	PEL	SMB	HEL	VIC
Audace San Michele								
DAM Valdagno			2–0	1–0		– (Note: The match DAM Valdagno-Sambonifacese wasn't disputed. FIGC decided that both the teams had lost the match and had 1 and 2 points deducted respectively.)	0–0	1–2
Lanerossi Schio		3–1		1–0		2–0 (Note: Forfeit)	4–0	1–1
Monti Padova		2–3	1–1			4–1	1–2	1–5
Pellizzari Arzignano								
Sambonifacese		1–3	2–3	10–1			0–0	0–2
Hellas Verona	2-0 (Note: Audace San Michele and Pellizzari Arzignano withdrew during the championship. All their matches were voided.)	2–0	5–0	4–2	6-0	2–2		3–1
Vicenza	5-1	5–0	4–1	3–0	2-1	4–0	2–0	

Source: Almanacco Illustrato del Calcio - La Storia 1898-2004, Panini Edizioni, Modena, September 2005 (in Italian)
Legend: Blue = home team win; Yellow = draw; Red = away team win.

==== Final round ====
Treviso and Vicenza withdrew before the start of the round

Team 1	Agg.	Team 2	1st leg	2nd leg
Venezia (Italian Social Republic)	7-3	(Italian Social Republic) Verona	5-1	2-2

Both Venezia and Verona were admitted to the semifinals.

=== Venezia Giulia ===
==== Standings ====
Pos	Team	Pld	W	D	L	GF	GA	GD	Pts	Qualification
1	Ampelea Isola d'Istria	14	10	2	2	35	17	+18	22	Qualified
2	Triestina	14	8	3	3	28	11	+17	19	Qualified
3	Pro Gorizia	14	6	4	4	21	21	0	16	
4	Monfalcone	14	6	2	6	19	22	−3	14	
5	San Giusto	14	4	5	5	14	14	0	13	
5	Udinese	14	5	3	6	17	25	−8	13	
7	Cormonese	14	4	0	10	16	28	−12	8	
8	Ponziana	14	3	1	10	13	25	−12	7	

==== Results ====
Home \ Away	AMP	COR	MFA	PON	PGO	SGI	TRI	UDI
Ampelea Isola d'Istria		4–2	3–0	5–2	4–1	1–1	2–0	6–2
Cormonese	1–4		2–1	1–0	0–1	3–1	0–4	0–2
Monfalcone	1–2	1–0		2–1	1–1	4–1	2–1	1–0
Ponziana	0–1	0–4	1–0		1–3	2–0	1–1	1–0
Pro Gorizia	3–1	2–1	1–1	3–2		1–1	0–3	3–1
San Giusto	0–1	2–0	1–2	1–0	2–0		0–0	4–0
Triestina	3–0	3–1	4–0	3–2	2–1	0–0		3–0
Udinese	1–1	3–1	4–3	1–0	1–1	0–0	2–1	

Source: Almanacco Illustrato del Calcio - La Storia 1898-2004, Panini Edizioni, Modena, September 2005 (in Italian)
Legend: Blue = home team win; Yellow = draw; Red = away team win.

=== Emilia ===
==== Group A ====
Standings

Pos	Team	Pld	W	D	L	GF	GA	GD	Pts	Qualification
1	Bologna	6	5	0	1	22	8	+14	10	Qualified
2	Cesena	6	4	0	2	12	5	+7	8	Qualified
3	Panigale	6	3	0	3	9	12	−3	6	
4	San Pietro in Casale	6	0	0	6	3	21	−18	−2 (Note: 2 points deducted)	

Notes:

Results

Home \ Away	BOL	CES	PAN	SPC
Bologna		2–0	4–0	2–1
Cesena	5–0		2–0	2–0
Panigale	1–3	3–2		3–1
San Pietro in Casale	1–11	0–1	0–2	

Source: Almanacco Illustrato del Calcio - La Storia 1898-2004, Panini Edizioni, Modena, September 2005 (in Italian)
Legend: Blue = home team win; Yellow = draw; Red = away team win.

==== Group B ====
Standings

Pos	Team	Pld	W	D	L	GF	GA	GD	Pts	Qualification
1	Faenza	8	4	3	1	18	7	+11	11	Qualified
1	Forlimpopoli	8	5	1	2	17	11	+6	11	Qualified
3	Ravenna	8	4	1	3	17	7	+10	9	
4	Imola	8	4	0	4	14	17	−3	8	
5	Forlì	8	0	1	7	3	27	−24	1	

Results

Home \ Away	FAE	FOR	FRL	IML	RAV
Faenza		1–1	4–1	5–0	1–1
Forlì	1–2		1–5	0–1	0–3
Forlimpopoli	2–2	3–0		3–2	2–1
Imola	0–3	7–0	1–0		2–1
Ravenna	1–0	5–0	0–1	5–1	

Source: Almanacco Illustrato del Calcio - La Storia 1898-2004, Panini Edizioni, Modena, September 2005 (in Italian)
Legend: Blue = home team win; Yellow = draw; Red = away team win.

==== Group C ====
Standings

Pos	Team	Pld	W	D	L	GF	GA	GD	Pts	Qualification
1	Modena	8	6	2	0	17	6	+11	14	Qualified (Note: Carpi qualified on goal difference.)
2	Carpi	8	4	3	1	19	6	+13	11	Qualified
2	Reggiana	8	5	1	2	13	9	+4	11	
4	Mantova	8	1	1	6	11	28	−17	3	
5	Centese	8	0	1	7	11	22	−11	1	

Notes:

Results

Home \ Away	CRP	CEN	MAN	MOD	REA
Carpi		2–1	6–1	0–0	1–1
Centese	1–5		2–2	1–2	0–1
Mantova	0–4	3–1		1–3	1–2
Modena	1–1	4–3	5–0		1–0
Reggiana	1–0	3–2	5–3	0–1	

Source: Almanacco Illustrato del Calcio - La Storia 1898-2004, Panini Edizioni, Modena, September 2005 (in Italian)
Legend: Blue = home team win; Yellow = draw; Red = away team win.

==== Group D ====
Standings

Pos	Team	Pld	W	D	L	GF	GA	GD	Pts	Qualification
1	VV.FF. Spezia	8	5	3	0	14	6	+8	13	Qualified
2	Corradini Suzzara	8	5	1	2	15	8	+7	11	Qualified
3	Fidentina	8	2	4	2	20	20	0	8	
4	Parma	8	2	3	3	8	12	−4	7	
5	Orlandi Busseto	8	0	1	7	7	18	−11	0 (Note: 1 point deducted)	

Notes:

Results

Home \ Away	COR	FID	ORL	PAR	VFS
Corradini Suzzara		6–0	2–0	2–1	0–2
Fidentina	2–3		2–1	7–1	1–1
Orlandi Busseto	1–2	3–3		0–1	1–2
Parma	0–0	1–1	4–1		0–0
VV.FF. Spezia	2–0	4–4	2–0	1–0	

Source: Almanacco Illustrato del Calcio - La Storia 1898-2004, Panini Edizioni, Modena, September 2005 (in Italian)
Legend: Blue = home team win; Yellow = draw; Red = away team win.

=== Tuscany ===
==== Standings ====
The qualified team, Lucchese, was excluded from the championship following the allied invasion of Tuscany.

=== Lazio ===
==== Standings ====
Lazio was excluded from the championship following the liberation of Rome. The organisation of the regional tournament, from then on known as Campionato romano di guerra 1943-1944, was taken over by the Kingdom of Italy.

== Semifinals ==
=== Group A (Piedmont and Lombardy) ===
==== Standings ====
Pos	Team	Pld	W	D	L	GF	GA	GD	Pts	Qualification
1	Torino FIAT	6	3	2	1	21	12	+9	8	Qualified
2	Juventus Cisitalia	6	3	1	2	15	9	+6	7	
3	Ambrosiana-Inter	6	2	2	2	12	13	−1	6	
4	Varese	6	1	1	4	6	20	−14	3	

==== Results ====
Home \ Away	AMB	JUV	TOR	VAR
Ambrosiana-Inter		2–1	3–3	3–0
Juventus Cisitalia	1–0		3–1	6–1
Torino FIAT	6–2	3–3		2–1
Varese	2–2	2–1	0–6	

Source: Almanacco Illustrato del Calcio - La Storia 1898-2004, Panini Edizioni, Modena, September 2005 (in Italian)
Legend: Blue = home team win; Yellow = draw; Red = away team win.

=== Group B (Veneto and Venezia Giulia) ===
Verona withdrew before the start of the semifinals.

==== Standings ====
Pos	Team	Pld	W	D	L	GF	GA	GD	Pts	Qualification
1	Venezia	4	2	2	0	3	0	+3	6	Qualified
2	Ampelea Isola d'Istria	3	1	0	2	2	4	−2	2 (Note: Ampelea Isola d'Istria and Triestina renounced to play the last match: Venezia was already qualified and there were public security problems due to the war and the rivalry between the two teams' fans.)	
2	Triestina	3	0	2	1	1	2	−1	2	

==== Results ====
Home \ Away	AMP	TRI	VEN
Ampelea Isola d'Istria		– (Note: Ampelea Isola d'Istria and Triestina renounced to play the last match: Venezia was already qualified and there were public security problems due to the war and the rivalry between the two teams' fans.)	0–1
Triestina	1–2		0–0
Venezia	2–0 (Note: Decided by the FIGC.)	0–0	

Source: Almanacco Illustrato del Calcio - La Storia 1898-2004, Panini Edizioni, Modena, September 2005 (in Italian)
Legend: Blue = home team win; Yellow = draw; Red = away team win.

=== Group C (Emilia) ===
==== Round 1 ====
===== Group A =====
Standings

Pos	Team	Pld	W	D	L	GF	GA	GD	Pts	Qualification
1	Bologna	6	4	1	1	11	5	+6	9	Qualified
2	Cesena	6	4	0	2	13	6	+7	8	
3	Forlimpopoli	6	2	2	2	10	11	−1	6	
4	Faenza	6	0	1	5	5	17	−12	1	

Results

Home \ Away	BOL	CES	FAE	FRL
Bologna		2–0	3–1	3–1
Cesena	2–0		5–1	2–0
Faenza	0–2	0–2		0–2
Forlimpopoli	1–1	3–2	3–3	

Source: Almanacco Illustrato del Calcio - La Storia 1898-2004, Panini Edizioni, Modena, September 2005 (in Italian)
Legend: Blue = home team win; Yellow = draw; Red = away team win.

===== Group B =====
Standings

Pos	Team	Pld	W	D	L	GF	GA	GD	Pts	Qualification
1	VV.FF. Spezia	6	5	0	1	14	4	+10	10	Qualified
2	Corradini Suzzara	6	2	1	3	7	10	−3	4 (Note: 1 point deducted)	
2	Carpi	6	2	1	3	5	7	−2	4	
4	Modena	6	2	0	4	3	8	−5	3	

Notes:

Results

Home \ Away	CRP	COR	MOD	VFS
Carpi		1–1	0–1	2–1
Corradini Suzzara	2–0 (Note: Decided by the FIGC.)		2–0	2–5
Modena	0–2	2–0		0–2
VV.FF. Spezia	2–0	2–0	2–0	

Source: Almanacco Illustrato del Calcio - La Storia 1898-2004, Panini Edizioni, Modena, September 2005 (in Italian)
Legend: Blue = home team win; Yellow = draw; Red = away team win.

==== Round 2 ====
Team 1	Agg.	Team 2	1st leg	2nd leg
Bologna (Italian Social Republic)	0-4	(Italian Social Republic) VV.FF. Spezia	0-2	0-2

VV.FF. Spezia didn't play the semifinals, due to the retirement of Lucchese (the semifinalist of Tuscany), and they were directly admitted to the final.

== Final round ==
=== Standings ===
Pos	Team	Pld	W	D	L	GF	GA	GD	Pts	Result
1	VV.FF. Spezia	2	1	1	0	3	2	+1	3	Champions
2	Torino FIAT	2	1	0	1	6	4	+2	2	
3	Venezia	2	0	1	1	3	6	−3	1	

=== Results ===
Team 1	Score	Team 2
Venezia (Italy)	1-1	(Italy) VV.FF. Spezia
VV.FF. Spezia (Italy)	2-1	(Italy) Torino FIAT
Torino FIAT (Italy)	5-2	(Italy) Venezia

== References and sources ==
- Fabrizio Calzia and Paolo Rabajoli, Lo Scudetto per sempre – I Vigili del fuoco della Spezia Campioni d’Italia 1944, Sagep e Il Secolo XIX
