= 1954–55 Serie C =

17th edition of an Italian football league division

Serie C
- Season: 1954–55
- Champions: Bari
- Runner up: Livorno
- Relegated: Fanfulla; Lecce; Bolzano; Carrarese

The 1954–55 Serie C was the seventeenth edition of Serie C, the third highest league in the Italian football league system.

== Final classification ==
Pos	Team	Pld	W	D	L	GF	GA	GR	Pts	Promotion or relegation
1	Bari	34	18	9	7	40	21	1.905	45	Promoted to Serie B
2	Livorno	34	17	11	6	53	32	1.656	45	Promoted to Serie B
3	Catanzaro	34	14	10	10	45	34	1.324	38	
4	Empoli	34	15	7	12	52	42	1.238	37	
5	Cremonese	34	16	5	13	49	42	1.167	37	
6	Sanremese	34	14	8	12	53	41	1.293	36	
7	Lecco	34	12	11	11	49	46	1.065	35	
8	Venezia	34	13	9	12	37	37	1.000	35	
9	Piombino	34	12	11	11	27	28	0.964	35	
10	Sambenedettese	34	11	12	11	37	37	1.000	34	
11	Carbosarda	34	10	14	10	36	36	1.000	34	
12	Piacenza	34	13	8	13	37	46	0.804	34	
13	Siracusa	34	12	9	13	33	43	0.767	33	
14	Prato	34	12	9	13	41	43	0.953	33	Relegation tie-breaker
15	Fanfulla	34	13	7	14	42	34	1.235	33	Relegation tie-breaker
16	Lecce	34	10	6	18	42	57	0.737	26	Relegated to IV Serie
17	Bolzano	34	8	6	20	35	66	0.530	22	Relegated to IV Serie
18	Carrarese	34	5	10	19	31	54	0.574	20	Relegated to IV Serie

Bari ranked 1st for best goal average.

== Relegation tie-breaker ==
Team 1	Score	Team 2
Fanfulla (Italy)	0-2	(Italy) Prato

Fanfulla relegated to IV Serie.
