= 1951–52 Serie B =

Italian football league season

Serie B
- Season: 1951–52
- Champions: Roma; 1st title

Serie B 1951-52 team distribution

The Serie B 1951–52 was the twentieth tournament of this competition played in Italy since its creation.

== Teams ==
Monza, Valdagno, Piombino and Stabia had been promoted from Serie C, while Roma and Genoa had been relegated from Serie A.

== Events ==
A provisional fifth relegation was added to reduce the league.

FIGC’s President Ottorino Barassi imposed a playoff between the second club in B and the seventeenth in A to reduce the Serie A.

== Final classification ==
Pos	Team	Pld	W	D	L	GF	GA	GR	Pts	Promotion or relegation
1	Roma (P, C)	38	22	9	7	62	24	2.583	53	Promotion to Serie A
2	Brescia	38	18	16	4	44	24	1.833	52	Promotion play-offs
3	Messina	38	16	13	9	37	23	1.609	45	
4	Catania	38	17	10	11	48	39	1.231	44	
5	Genoa	38	17	8	13	61	38	1.605	42	
6	Piombino	38	15	11	12	48	39	1.231	41	
6	Treviso	38	14	13	11	44	38	1.158	41	
8	Modena	38	12	15	11	51	46	1.109	39	
8	Salernitana	38	13	13	12	44	43	1.023	39	
10	Vicenza	38	13	12	13	47	40	1.175	38	
10	Verona	38	14	10	14	46	44	1.045	38	
12	Fanfulla	38	13	11	14	43	49	0.878	37	
12	Siracusa	38	14	9	15	39	56	0.696	37	
14	Marzotto	38	12	12	14	48	47	1.021	36	
14	Monza	38	11	14	13	30	43	0.698	36	
16	Venezia (R)	38	10	14	14	38	47	0.809	34	Relegation to Serie C
16	Livorno (R)	38	12	10	16	33	43	0.767	34	Relegation to Serie C
18	Pisa (R)	38	10	11	17	32	44	0.727	31	Relegation to Serie C
19	Reggiana (R)	38	8	8	22	38	70	0.543	24	Relegation to Serie C
20	Stabia (Note: 1 point deducted.) (R)	38	5	9	24	35	81	0.432	18	Relegation to Serie C

Source: Panini
(C) Champions; (P) Promoted; (R) Relegated

== Results ==
Home \ Away	BRE	CTN	FAN	GEN	LIV	MAR	MES	MOD	MON	PIO	PIS	REA	ROM	SAL	SIR	STA	TRV	VEN	HEL	VIC
Brescia		0–0	1–0	1–1	2–0	0–1	1–0	0–0	3–1	1–0	1–0	1–0	1–0	1–1	2–1	1–0	0–0	2–2	4–0	1–0
Catania	0–0		2–1	4–1	3–1	1–0	0–1	1–1	3–0	1–1	1–0	4–1	0–1	1–1	1–0	4–2	2–1	2–0	1–1	3–1
Fanfulla	0–1	3–1		2–0	1–0	1–1	0–0	2–1	1–1	0–0	1–0	4–0	1–1	0–0	2–0	4–1	3–1	1–0	0–1	1–1
Genoa	1–2	2–2	2–0		3–0	2–2	3–1	0–2	3–0	3–0	2–2	2–1	1–0	0–1	4–0	5–0	1–0	2–2	2–0	2–0
Livorno	3–2	0–1	0–1	1–0		3–2	1–0	0–0	1–1	0–0	1–2	2–0	1–0	1–1	1–0	1–1	1–2	2–0	2–2	2–0
Marzotto	1–1	2–0	1–0	2–1	1–0		0–0	0–0	4–0	1–2	3–0	2–1	2–3	0–1	1–0	4–0	0–0	0–0	2–3	2–3
Messina	0–1	0–0	2–0	0–0	3–1	0–0		1–0	0–0	2–0	0–0	0–0	0–1	2–1	0–1	4–1	2–1	2–0	0–0	1–0
Modena	2–2	2–0	2–2	1–0	2–0	4–0	3–0		1–1	1–1	3–1	3–1	0–2	0–0	8–2	3–1	2–2	1–1	0–0	0–2
Monza	2–3	2–1	0–0	1–0	1–0	1–1	1–1	0–2		2–1	0–0	1–1	0–2	2–0	3–0	0–1	1–0	1–0	1–0	1–0
Piombino	1–1	1–0	2–1	2–1	0–0	2–2	1–4	0–1	2–1		0–0	4–0	3–1	1–2	0–1	2–0	4–0	3–0	2–0	2–1
Pisa	0–0	0–1	0–1	1–0	0–2	1–0	0–3	5–0	0–0	1–1		2–1	2–0	1–1	1–0	2–1	2–0	0–0	1–3	0–0
Reggiana	0–0	0–1	3–2	0–4	1–1	5–1	0–0	5–2	0–0	1–2	3–1		0–7	2–1	2–0	3–1	1–1	2–0	1–1	0–1
Roma	0–0	3–0	2–1	1–2	3–0	3–1	1–0	0–0	1–0	2–0	2–1	4–0		2–0	6–0	3–0	2–1	2–0	1–0	1–0
Salernitana	0–1	0–1	2–0	0–2	2–1	2–0	0–1	5–1	2–0	2–0	0–0	2–0	2–2		1–0	3–1	1–1	1–1	3–1	2–2
Siracusa	1–0	3–1	1–1	2–1	1–0	0–3	1–3	1–1	1–1	1–0	4–1	2–1	0–0	2–1		0–0	0–0	3–1	2–0	2–2
Stabia	2–2	1–1	0–2	0–2	1–2	2–3	1–2	1–1	1–1	2–4	1–5	2–1	0–0	1–1	2–4		2–1	2–1	2–0	0–2
Treviso	1–0	0–0	1–0	1–1	0–0	0–0	0–0	3–1	4–0	2–1	2–0	3–0	2–0	4–1	1–1	2–1		1–0	2–1	1–1
Venezia	0–0	4–1	5–3	1–4	1–1	2–1	1–2	1–0	2–1	0–0	1–0	1–0	2–2	4–0	0–0	1–1	1–0		1–0	0–0
Hellas Verona	3–3	1–0	3–1	0–0	3–0	1–1	2–0	1–0	1–2	0–2	2–0	3–0	0–0	3–0	3–0	2–0	0–1	2–2		1–0
Vicenza	0–2	1–3	0–0	3–1	0–1	2–1	0–0	2–0	0–0	1–1	3–0	2–1	1–1	1–1	1–2	2–0	5–2	2–0	5–2	

Source: Almanacco Illustrato del Calcio - La Storia 1898-2004, Panini Edizioni, Modena, September 2005 (in Italian)
Legend: Blue = home team win; Yellow = draw; Red = away team win.

== Serie A qualification play-off ==
Since it was decided to reduce the number of Serie A teams from 20 to 18 for the 1952-1953 season, only the top 16 teams in Serie A were guaranteed to remain there the following season, and only the first-placed team in Serie B was guaranteed a direct promotion to Serie A. The 18th team would be decided in a one-game playoff between the 17th-placed team in Serie A and the 2nd-placed team in Serie B.

The 3 last-placed teams in Serie A were guaranteed relegation. However, due to a tie for 17th place between Lucchese and Triestina, the teams had to play a two-legged tie-breaking series to determine which team would be relegated and which team qualified for the playoff.

Game played in Valdagno on 13 July

Team 1	Score	Team 2
Brescia (Italy)	0-1	(Italy) Triestina

Triestina maintained its place in Serie A.

== References and sources ==
- Almanacco Illustrato del Calcio - La Storia 1898-2004, Panini Edizioni, Modena, September 2005
