= 1955–56 Serie C =

The 1955–56 Serie C was the eighteenth edition of Serie C, the third highest league in the Italian football league system.

== Final classification ==
| Pos | Team | Pld | W | D | L | GF | GA | GR | Pts | Promotion or relegation |
|---|---|---|---|---|---|---|---|---|---|---|
| 1 | Sambenedettese | 34 | 17 | 10 | 7 | 61 | 37 | 1.649 | 44 | Promoted to Serie B |
| 2 | Venezia | 34 | 17 | 10 | 7 | 41 | 23 | 1.783 | 44 | Promoted to Serie B |
| 3 | Carbosarda | 34 | 17 | 9 | 8 | 48 | 30 | 1.600 | 43 | |
| 4 | Cremonese | 34 | 15 | 9 | 10 | 53 | 42 | 1.262 | 39 | |
| 5 | Lecco | 34 | 14 | 11 | 9 | 43 | 43 | 1.000 | 39 | |
| 6 | Vigevano | 34 | 12 | 11 | 11 | 50 | 43 | 1.163 | 35 | |
| 7 | Sanremese | 34 | 14 | 7 | 13 | 40 | 39 | 1.026 | 35 | |
| 8 | Siracusa | 34 | 13 | 9 | 12 | 43 | 44 | 0.977 | 35 | |
| 9 | Piacenza (Note: Relegated to IV Serie for illicit in the match Piombino-Piacenza.) | 34 | 11 | 12 | 11 | 51 | 48 | 1.063 | 34 | Relegated to IV Serie |
| 10 | Prato | 34 | 10 | 13 | 11 | 39 | 36 | 1.083 | 33 | |
| 11 | Catanzaro | 34 | 11 | 11 | 12 | 42 | 42 | 1.000 | 33 | |
| 12 | Treviso | 34 | 8 | 17 | 9 | 36 | 42 | 0.857 | 33 | |
| 13 | Molfetta | 34 | 12 | 9 | 13 | 40 | 49 | 0.816 | 33 | |
| 14 | Mestrina | 34 | 13 | 6 | 15 | 37 | 41 | 0.902 | 32 | |
| 15 | Colleferro | 34 | 8 | 15 | 11 | 30 | 37 | 0.811 | 31 | Relegation tie-breaker |
| 16 | Pavia | 34 | 8 | 15 | 11 | 38 | 47 | 0.809 | 31 | Relegation tie-breaker |
| 17 | Empoli | 34 | 8 | 5 | 21 | 27 | 53 | 0.509 | 21 | Relegated to IV Serie |
| 18 | Piombino | 34 | 1 | 15 | 18 | 27 | 50 | 0.540 | 17 | Relegated to IV Serie |

== Relegation tie-breaker ==
| Team 1 | Score | Team 2 |
|---|---|---|
| Colleferro (Italy) | 0-1 | (Italy) Pavia |

Colleferro relegated to IV Serie.
