= Roberto Taliento =

Italian footballer

Personal information
- Date of birth: 8 July 1999 (age 27)
- Place of birth: Segrate, Italy
- Height: 1.86 m (6 ft 1 in)
- Position: Goalkeeper

Team information
- Current team: Club Milano

Youth career
- Atalanta

Senior career*
Years	Team	Apps	(Gls)
2017–2020	Atalanta	0	(0)
2017–2019	→ Giana Erminio (loan)	21	(0)
2019–2020	→ Südtirol (loan)	7	(0)
2021	Monopoli	9	(0)
2021–2022	Novara	1	(0)
2022–2023	Stresa Vergante	31	(0)
2023–2024	Magenta		
2024–2025	Casatese Merate	20	(0)
2025–	Club Milano	8	(0)
- * Club domestic league appearances and goals as of 25 June 2026

Roberto Taliento (born 8 July 1999) is an Italian footballer who plays as a goalkeeper for Serie D club Club Milano.

== Career ==
=== Atalanta ===
Born in Segrate, Taliento was a youth exponent of Atalanta.

==== Loan to Giana Erminio ====
On 17 July 2017, Taliento was loaned to Serie C club Giana Erminio on a season-long loan deal. On 8 November he made his professional debut in Serie C for Giana Erminio in a 4–3 home win over Piacenza, after 4 days, on 11 November, he kept his first clean sheet in a 0–0 away draw against Pisa. On 19 November he kept his second clean sheet in a 5–0 home win over Prato and after one week, on 26 November, Taliento kept his third clean in a 3–0 away win over Lucchese. Taliento ended his season-long loan to Giana Erminio with 19 appearances, 6 clean sheets and 33 goals conceded.

On 14 July 2018 his loan was extended for another season. Taliento started his second season at Giana Erminio with a 1–0 away win over Alessandria in the first round of Coppa Italia. On 5 August he played in a 4–0 away defeat against Crotone in the second round. On 16 September he played his first match and he kept his first clean sheet of the season in Serie C in a 0–0 away draw against Vicenza Virtus. Taliento ended his second season on loan at Giana Erminio with only 5 appearances, 10 goals conceded and 2 clean sheets.

==== Loan to Südtirol ====
On 12 July 2019, Taliento was loaned to Serie C club Südtirol on a season-long loan deal. Six months later, on 19 January 2020, he made his debut for the club in a 4–1 home win over Rimini. Three days later, on 22 January, he kept his first clean sheet for Südtirol in a 2–0 home win over Vis Pesaro and eleven days later, on 2 February, he kept his second clean sheet in a 5–0 home win over Arzignano Valchiampo. On 16 February he kept his third clean sheet in a 2–0 home win over Alma Juventus Fano. Taliento ended his season-long loan to Südtirol with 7 appearances, 5 goals conceded and 3 clean sheet.

=== Monopoli ===
On 13 January 2021, Taliento joined Monopoli as a free agent until the end of the season. Five weeks later, on 21 February, he made his debut for the club as a starter and he also kept his first clean sheet in a 1–0 home win over Cavese.

=== Novara ===
On 9 December 2021, he moved to Novara as a free agent.

== Career statistics ==
=== Club ===
As of match played 15 May 2022

Club	Season	League			Cup		Europe		Other		Total	
Club	Season	League	Apps	Goals	Apps	Goals	Apps	Goals	Apps	Goals	Apps	Goals
Giana Erminio (loan)	2017–18	Serie C	18	0	0	0	—		1 (Note: All appearance(s) in Serie C play-off.)	0	19	0
Giana Erminio (loan)	2018–19	Serie C	3	0	2	0	—		—		5	0
Südtirol (loan)	2019–20	Serie C	7	0	0	0	—		—		7	0
Monopoli	2020–21	Serie C	9	0	0	0	—		—		9	0
Novara	2021–22	Serie D	1	0	0	0	—		—		1	0
Career total			38	0	2	0	—		1	0	41	0
