= 1952–53 Serie C =

Serie C
- Season: 1952–53
- Promoted: Pavia and Alessandria
- Relegated: Reggiana, Vigevano, Stabia and Molfetta
- Matches played: 612
- Goals scored: 740 (1.21 per match)
- Top goalscorer: Mario Tortul (21)
- Biggest home win: Reggiana 6–0 Pisa
- Biggest away win: Vigevano 1–10 Empoli
- Highest scoring: Vigevano 1–10 Empoli

The 1952–53 Serie C was the fifteenth edition of Serie C, the third highest league in the Italian football league system.

The tournament was organized in a single table for the first time.

== Events ==
The league was organized into a single division of 18 teams.

- 5 had been relegated from Serie B after 1951–52 season;
- 11 had confirmed their places in the third division for the performances in 1951–52 Serie C;
- 2 obtained the place after a 4 teams qualification round.

No team had been promoted from lower divisions in 1951–52 season.

Each team played a total of 34 matches (17 at home, 17 away). The 2–1–0 point system was used for the classification.

At the end of the 34th round, teams at the first two positions of the classification were promoted in Serie B for the 1953–54 season. On the contrary, teams which finished their league at the last four places were relegated in IV Serie.

== Teams ==
Club	City	Stadium	1951–52 season	
Alessandria U.S.	Alessandria	Stadio Giuseppe Moccagatta	4th in C/A	Serie C 1952–53 team distribution
U.S. ArsenalTaranto	Taranto	Stadio Valentino Mazzola	2nd in C/D	Serie C 1952–53 team distribution
Empoli F.C.	Empoli	Stadio Carlo Castellani	2nd in C/C	Serie C 1952–53 team distribution
U.S. Lecce	Lecce	Stadio Carlo Pranzo	3rd in C/D	Serie C 1952–53 team distribution
U.S. Livorno	Livorno	Stadio Comunale	16th in B	Serie C 1952–53 team distribution
A.C. Mantova	Mantua	Stadio Danilo Martelli	3rd in C/B	Serie C 1952–53 team distribution
A.S. Molfetta	Molfetta	Stadio Paolo Poli	4th in C/D	Serie C 1952–53 team distribution
A.S. Parma	Parma	Stadio Ennio Tardini	2nd in C/B	Serie C 1952–53 team distribution
F.C. Pavia	Pavia	Stadio Pietro Fortunati	3rd in C/A	Serie C 1952–53 team distribution
Piacenza F.C.	Piacenza	Stadio Barriera Genova	1st in C/B	Serie C 1952–53 team distribution
Pisa S.C.	Pisa	Arena Garibaldi	18th in B	Serie C 1952–53 team distribution
A.C. Reggiana	Reggio Emilia	Stadio Mirabello	19th in B	Serie C 1952–53 team distribution
U.S. Sambenedettese	San Benedetto del Tronto	Stadio Fratelli Ballarin	3rd in C/C	Serie C 1952–53 team distribution
U.S. Sanremese	Sanremo	Polisportivo Comunale	2nd in C/A	Serie C 1952–53 team distribution
A.C. Stabia	Castellammare di Stabia	Stadio San Marco	20th in B	Serie C 1952–53 team distribution
U.S. A. Toma Maglie	Maglie	Stadio Tamborino–Frisari	1st in C/D	Serie C 1952–53 team distribution
A.C. Venezia	Venice	Stadio Pier Luigi Penzo	16th in B	Serie C 1952–53 team distribution
A.C. Vigevano	Vigevano	Stadio Comunale	1st in C/A	Serie C 1952–53 team distribution

== Final classification ==
Pos	Team	Pld	W	D	L	GF	GA	GD	Pts	Promotion or relegation
1	Pavia	34	22	4	8	54	29	+25	48	Promoted to Serie B
2	Alessandria	34	17	12	5	54	31	+23	46	Promoted to Serie B
3	ArsenalTaranto	34	16	10	8	44	34	+10	42	
4	Sanremese	34	17	3	14	54	40	+14	37	
5	Empoli	34	13	11	10	49	37	+12	37	
6	Parma	34	14	8	12	47	31	+16	36	
7	Livorno	34	12	11	11	30	33	−3	35	
8	Pisa	34	12	9	13	38	45	−7	33	
9	Venezia	34	13	7	14	30	43	−13	33	
10	Piacenza	34	11	10	13	49	44	+5	32	
11	Toma Maglie	34	11	10	13	32	33	−1	32	
12	Mantova	34	13	6	15	36	45	−9	32	
13	Sambenedettese	34	11	9	14	36	45	−9	31	
14	Lecce	34	11	9	14	35	44	−9	31	
15	Molfetta	34	7	16	11	34	45	−11	30	Relegated to IV Serie
15	Stabia	34	7	10	17	34	58	−24	24	Relegated to IV Serie
17	Vigevano	34	8	6	20	38	67	−29	22	Relegated to IV Serie
18	Reggiana	34	9	13	12	46	37	+9	11 (Note: 20 points deducted for an illicit.)	Relegated to IV Serie

== Results ==
Home \ Away	ALE	ARS	EMP	LCE	LIV	MAN	MOL	PAR	PAV	PIA	PIS	REA	SBN	SNR	STA	TOM	VEN	VIG
Alessandria		1–1	1–0	3–0	3–1	4–1	2–2	1–0	0–0	2–2	2–0	1–0	3–0	1–0	2–0	2–0	4–1	3–1
ArsenalTaranto	2–0		1–1	1–2	3–1	0–0	0–0	1–1	1–0	1–1	2–0	1–0	2–0	1–0	3–1	2–1	0–1	4–2
Empoli	1–0	1–1		2–0	1–0	3–0	1–2	1–0	2–1	0–0	0–0	4–1	1–0	1–1	1–1	1–1	3–1	2–1
Lecce	0–0	1–2	1–2		0–0	2–0	4–2	0–1	3–2	1–0	0–0	1–1	2–0	2–1	1–1	0–0	2–1	3–1
Livorno	3–3	0–1	3–1	1–0		1–2	0–0	0–0	2–1	2–1	2–0	1–1	1–0	1–0	1–0	1–0	0–1	3–1
Mantova	3–3	0–1	2–0	3–1	2–2		3–1	1–0	0–2	0–2	1–1	3–2	5–1	1–4	2–0	1–0	2–0	0–2
Molfetta	0–0	0–1	1–1	2–0	0–0	0–1		1–2	1–1	0–0	1–1	2–0	0–0	0–0	2–1	1–1	2–0	2–0
Parma	2–0	4–1	0–0	1–1	0–0	1–0	4–1		1–2	2–0	4–0	1–2	2–0	1–0	4–0	2–1	5–0	5–2
Pavia	0–0	2–0	3–2	4–2	5–0	3–0	4–1	2–0		2–1	1–0	2–1	2–0	2–1	2–0	1–0	2–1	1–0
Piacenza	1–2	4–2	1–1	4–1	1–0	1–2	2–2	1–1	3–0		3–1	2–2	4–0	2–0	3–0	1–2	1–3	1–0
Pisa	3–3	1–0	2–1	1–1	0–0	0–1	2–0	0–0	0–1	2–1		2–1	4–1	0–2	3–0	1–0	3–1	3–1
Reggiana	1–1	1–1	3–0	1–2	1–2	0–0	4–2	1–0	0–1	0–0	6–0		1–1	2–0	5–1	0–0	3–1	4–0
Sambenedettese	2–0	1–1	3–0	2–0	2–0	1–0	1–2	1–0	2–1	3–1	1–1	0–0		4–0	3–0	1–0	0–0	0–0
Sanremese	1–2	3–4	2–1	1–0	1–0	3–0	6–2	2–1	1–0	2–1	0–2	3–1	4–1		4–1	2–0	2–0	4–2
Stabia	2–0	1–1	1–3	0–0	0–0	2–0	2–2	2–0	1–1	1–2	3–1	0–0	2–2	1–0		5–2	1–1	2–3
Toma Maglie	0–1	2–0	1–1	1–2	0–0	1–0	0–0	2–0	1–2	2–2	2–1	2–1	3–1	0–0	2–0		1–0	2–1
Venezia	0–3	1–0	1–0	2–0	1–0	0–0	0–0	1–1	2–1	2–0	2–1	0–0	1–0	2–1	1–0	0–2		0–0
Vigevano	1–1	0–1	1–10	1–0	1–2	1–0	1–0	4–1	0–1	3–0	1–2	0–0	2–2	1–3	1–2	0–0	3–2	

Updated to match(es) played on unknown. Source: Il Corriere dello Sport – year 1953, available on emeroteca.coni.it (in Italian)
Legend: Blue = home team win; Yellow = draw; Red = away team win.
