= 1951–52 Serie C =

The 1951–52 Serie C was the fourteenth edition of Serie C, the third highest league in the Italian football league system.

FIGC reduced the number of teams to form only one national group.
As also Serie A and Serie B had to be a bit reduced to thirty-four matchdays, only the four best clubs of each group in Serie C had the possibility to hold their rank.

== Regular season ==
=== Group A (North-West) ===
Pos	Team	Pld	Pts	Result
1	Vigevano	34	51	Play-off
2	Sanremese	34	47	
3	Pavia	34	47	
4	Alessandria	34	45	Play-off
5	Lecco	34	42	Relegated to IV Serie
6	Rivarolese	34	41	Relegated to IV Serie
7	Savona	34	40	Relegated to IV Serie
8	Casale	34	34	Relegated to IV Serie
9	Fossanese	34	34	Relegated to IV Serie
10	Ponte San Pietro	34	33	Relegated to IV Serie
11	Saronno	34	29	Relegated to IV Serie
12	Pro Vercelli	34	29	Relegated to IV Serie
13	Aosta	34	29	Relegated to IV Serie
14	Crema	34	28	Relegated to IV Serie
15	Seregno	34	25	Relegated to IV Serie
16	Biellese	34	23	Relegated to IV Serie
17	Varese	34	23	Relegated to IV Serie
18	Gallaratese	34	18	Relegated to IV Serie

=== Group B (North-East) ===
Pos	Team	Pld	Pts	Result
1	Piacenza	34	55	Play-off
2	Parma	34	52	
3	Mantova	34	52	
4	Marzoli Palazzolo	34	48	Play-off
5	Trento (R)	34	40	Relegated to IV Serie
6	SAICI Torviscosa (R)	34	40	Relegated to IV Serie
7	Pro Lissone (R)	34	38	Relegated to IV Serie
8	Forlì (R)	34	34	Relegated to IV Serie
9	Sandonà (R)	34	31	Relegated to IV Serie
10	Ravenna (R)	34	31	Relegated to IV Serie
11	Cremonese (R)	34	31	Relegated to IV Serie
12	Mestrina (R)	34	30	Relegated to IV Serie
13	Pro Gorizia (R)	34	29	Relegated to IV Serie
14	Ponziana (R)	34	27	Relegated to IV Serie
15	Villasanta (R)	34	25 (Note: 1 point deducted.)	Relegated to IV Serie
16	Parabiago (R)	34	24	Relegated to IV Serie
17	Rovereto (R)	34	18	Relegated to IV Serie
18	Edera (R)	34	7 (Note: 3 points deducted.)	Relegated to IV Serie

Source: Panini
(R) Relegated

=== Group C (Centre) ===
Pos	Team	Pld	Pts	Result
1	Cagliari	34	52	Play-off
2	Empoli	34	46	
3	Sambenedettese	34	45	
4	Siena	34	43	Play-off
5	Prato	34	42	Relegated to IV Serie
6	Rapallo Ruentes	34	41	Relegated to IV Serie
7	Chinotto Neri Roma	34	39	Relegated to IV Serie
8	Arezzo	34	38	Relegated to IV Serie
9	Carbosarda	34	36	Relegated to IV Serie
10	Pontedera	34	31	Relegated to IV Serie
11	Chieti	34	31	Relegated to IV Serie
12	Jesina	34	30	Relegated to IV Serie
13	Anconitana	34	29	Relegated to IV Serie
14	Spezia	34	27	Relegated to IV Serie
15	Lanciotto	34	26	Relegated to IV Serie
16	Rosignano Solvay	34	25	Relegated to IV Serie
17	Fermana	34	22	Relegated to IV Serie
18	Maceratese	34	11	Relegated to IV Serie

=== Group D (South) ===
Pos	Team	Pld	Pts	Result
1	Toma Maglie	34	50	Play-off
2	ArsenalTaranto	34	46	
3	Lecce	34	45	
4	Molfetta	34	43	Play-off
5	Cosenza	34	39	Relegated to IV Serie
6	Bari	34	36	Relegated to IV Serie
7	Brindisi	34	35	Relegated to IV Serie
8	Catanzaro	34	35	Relegated to IV Serie
9	Casertana	34	32	Relegated to IV Serie
10	Crotone	34	30	Relegated to IV Serie
11	Nissena	34	30	Relegated to IV Serie
12	Palmese	34	29	Relegated to IV Serie
13	Benevento	34	28	Relegated to IV Serie
14	BPD Colleferro	34	25	Relegated to IV Serie
15	Marsala	34	24 (Note: 1 point deducted.)	Relegated to IV Serie
16	Foggia	34	20 (Note: 14 points deducted.)	Relegated to IV Serie
17	Reggina	34	17	Relegated to IV Serie
18	Latina	34	16	Relegated to IV Serie

== Play-off ==
=== Promotion ===
Pos	Team	Pld	Pts
1	Cagliari (P, C)	6	11
2	Piacenza	6	7
3	Toma Maglie	6	3
4	Vigevano	6	3

Source: Panini
(C) Champions; (P) Promoted

=== Relegation ===
Pos	Team	Pld	Pts
1	Alessandria	6	8
2	Molfetta	6	7
3	Marzoli Palazzolo (R)	6	6
4	Siena (R)	6	3

Source: Panini
(R) Relegated
