= 1957–58 Serie C =

Italian football league season

The 1957–58 Serie C was the twentieth edition of Serie C, the third highest league in the Italian football league system.

There were no relegations in order to expand and create two geographic groups. The expansion was needed to reduce the costs of away matches.

== Final classification ==
Pos	Team	Pld	W	D	L	GF	GA	GD	Pts	Promotion or relegation
1	Reggiana	34	17	9	8	49	33	+16	43	Promoted to Serie B
2	Vigevano	34	16	9	9	52	39	+13	41	Promoted to Serie B
3	Ravenna	34	16	8	10	62	39	+23	40	
4	Carbosarda	34	15	10	9	42	34	+8	40	
5	Pro Vercelli	34	15	8	11	35	26	+9	38	
6	Siena	34	12	14	8	39	35	+4	38	
7	Biellese	34	12	12	10	40	30	+10	36	
8	Legnano	34	12	11	11	53	41	+12	35	
9	Catanzaro	34	15	5	14	43	46	−3	35	
10	Fedit Roma	34	11	12	11	32	32	0	34	
11	Reggina	34	11	10	13	24	36	−12	32	
12	Cremonese	34	11	9	14	29	43	−14	31	
13	Siracusa	34	11	9	14	37	53	−16	31	
14	Salernitana	34	10	10	14	32	44	−12	30	
15	Pro Patria	34	11	7	16	42	45	−3	29	
16	Mestre	34	11	6	17	39	40	−1	28	
17	Livorno	34	10	6	18	40	58	−18	26	
18	Sanremese	34	7	11	16	35	51	−16	25	
