= SSD Sanremese Calcio =

Italian football club

Sanremese
- Full name: Società Sportiva Dilettantistica; Sanremese Calcio srl
- Nicknames: Biancoazzurri (Blue-white), Matuziani (old name of the people of San Remo), Sanre (abbreviation of team name)
- Founded: 1904 (football division in 1911); 1987 (refounded); 2009 (refounded); 2012 (refounded); 2015 (refounded)
- Ground: Stadio Comunale di Sanremo, Sanremo, Italy
- Capacity: 4,000
- Chairman: Alessandro Masu
- Head Coach: Gianluca Festa
- League: Serie D
- 2025–26: Serie D/A, 7th
- Website: www.sanremesecalcio.it
Home colours	Away colours

Società Sportiva Dilettantistica Sanremese Calcio, commonly referred to as Sanremese, is an Italian association football club, based in Sanremo, Liguria. It currently plays in Serie D.

The historical U.S. Sanremese was liquidated in 1987. The present-day club was established in 2015.

== History ==
=== From 1904 to 1987 ===
The club was founded in 1904 as U.S. Sanremese, but the football team was founded only in 1911. The US Sanremese was born by the merger of the first two local teams: the Ausonia and the Speranza.

The team played three seasons in Serie B from 1937–38 to 1939–40 when they were relegated in Serie C. In the 1937–38 season gets the 9th place in Serie B that is the best result ever in club history.

It's the only Italian team to have played in every championship of Serie C in a sole national division from 1952–53 to 1957–58.

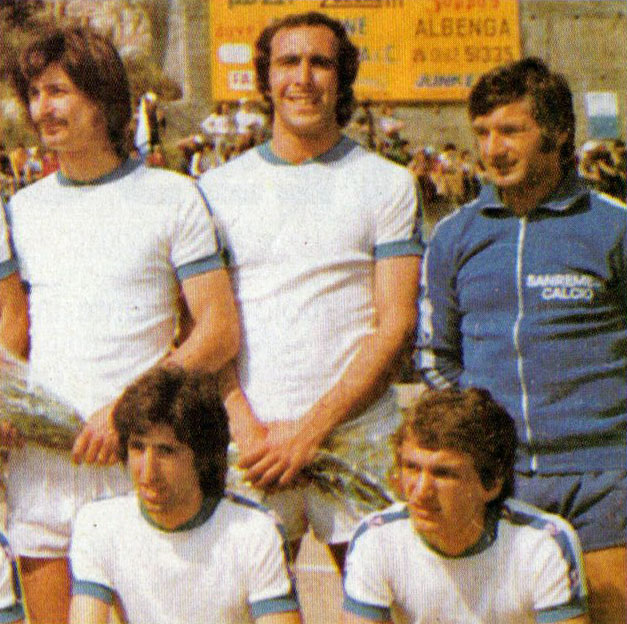
Giampiero Ventura with Sanremese in the 1974–75 season

The team from 1977–78 to 1978–79 came from Serie D to Serie C1. The club played seven consecutive seasons in Serie C1 from 1979 to 1980, when it achieved an historic 4th place, to 1985–86 when they retreated in Serie C2 and the next year in Serie D.

==== Anglo-Italian Cup ====
In the season 1980–81 it played the Anglo-Italian Cup, called in this year Talbot Challenge Cup. The team won 3–1 with Hungerford Town and 2–1 with Bridgend Town, draw 2–2 with Oxford City and lost 1–0 with Poole Town. It ranked third in the group with 7 points, dominated by Modena then won the competition.

==== The bankruptcy ====
In the summer of 1987 the company fell after 83 years of existence because of the large debts.

=== From 1987 to 2008 ===
==== The rebirth ====
The club was refounded in 1987 allocating by the Terza Categoria as Sanremese Football Club 1904

On 1992 with the merger with Sanremo 80, it filming the historic name of U.S. Sanremese Calcio 1904.

==== Eccellenza ====
In the league 1991–92 and 1995–96 the club won the regional Eccellenza Liguria gaining promotion to Serie D and the 1995–96 Regional Coppa Italia Liguria:.

==== Between Serie C2 and Serie D ====
In the season 1997–98 won the Serie D and lost in the final scudetto with the Giugliano. The team played two seasons in Serie C2 from 1998–99 to 1999–2000 when it retreated to Serie D.

The club played four seasons in Serie D from 2000–01 to 2001–04 when was admitted to Serie C2.

The team played three seasons in Serie C2 from 2004–05 to 2006–07 when it retreated to Serie D.

On the season 2005–06 lost the final Coppa Italia Serie C with the Gallipoli lose away 1–0 and at home wins 2–1.

From November 2007, most of the players leave the team, become in the meantime USD Sanremese 1904, which was in strong crisis of liquidity, for non-payment of wages, thus leading to relegation from the Serie D.

==== The radiation ====
On 10 July 2008 the club was declared inactive to the FIGC after being refused entry to the League of Eccellenza, because of the large debts.

In summer 2008, the last president Carlo Barillà refounded the team with the same name of U.S.D. Sanremese 1904, that played in the season 2008–09 in Seconda Categoria.

=== From 2009 to 2011 ===
==== The second refoundation ====
On 4 August 2009 the Ospedaletti-Sanremo, just promoted from the Promozione Ligure girone A, after the agreement with Carlo Barillà for the cessation of the homonymous team that he was founded, changes name in U.S.D. Sanremese Calcio 1904: so the company's family Del Gratta has been the only legitimate heir of the old society.

==== 2009–10 Eccellenza ====
In the league 2009–10, coached by Giancarlo "Carlo" Calabria Sanremese wins the regional Eccellenza Liguria gaining promotion in Serie D. and the Regional Coppa Italia Liguria:. It eliminated in the Coppa Italia Dilettanti 2009-2010 from Bolzano, in the quarter-finals losing for 1–2 at home and equalizing 0–0 away.

==== 2010–11 Lega Pro Seconda Divisione ====
On 4 August 2010 became U.S. Sanremese Calcio 1904 the team obtained the admission into Lega Pro Seconda Divisione group A for the 2010–11 season. The club initially survived relegation on the pitch after a 3-2 aggregate win over Sacilese Calcio in the playoff round.

===== The owners Del Gratta arrested resign =====
After the arrest, of 15 March 2011, of Marco and his father Riccardo Del Gratta, respectively President and Director General, the company was temporarily administered by Giancarlo Lupi, a brother-in-law of the President Marco Del Gratta.

They are accused of being the beneficiaries of the alleged threats and extortions to players of Sanremese, so that the latter rescind the onerous contracts signed in the summer.

Since 16 March 2011, after the resignations of the owners Marco and Riccardo Del Gratta, the new CEO was Giuseppe Fava, who was previously responsible for the youth sector.

===== Liquidation =====
On 30 June 2011, the club wasn't able to enter 2011–12 Lega Pro Seconda Divisione for failure to submit the required surety agreement and was so subsequently liquidated.

=== The new Sanremese ===
After a year of inactivity, in the summer 2012 the club was refounded as A.S.D. Sanremese by the entrepreneur Luca Colangelo and currently president, restarting from Terza Categoria Savona/Imperia. In the summer 2013 the club placed 2nd was promoted to repechage in Seconda Categoria.

Its home stadium has been the Campo Sportivo Pian di Poma in Sanremo.

The club on 6 October 2013, after a disastrous start on the group AB of Seconda Categoria Liguria sacked Mattia Moraglia, the coach of last season, replaced until the resignations of 21 October by Marco Pinto and after by Fabrizio Gatti. The club was promoted to Prima Categoria after the play off round.

In 2015, the club gave up its membership to allow another local club, ASD Carlin's Boys, to change its name to Unione Sanremo and restart from Eccellenza. The club won the Coppa Italia Dilettanti in 2016, thus ensuring automatic promotion to Serie D on their first year. The club was renamed Sanremese Calcio in 2019.

Its home stadium is the Stadio Comunale in Sanremo.

== Chronology ==
Chronology of Sanremese
1904 – The club was founded in 1904 as Unione Sportiva Sanremese 1904.; 1911 – US Sanremese Calcio 1904 born by the merger of the first two local teams: the Ausonia and the Speranza.; 1932–1933 – Unione Sportiva Sanremese Calcio 1904, until then affiliated with the U.L.I.C., plays in his first championship of F.I.G.C. in the group A of Seconda Divisione liguria.; 1933–1934 – 1st in the group A of Seconda Divisione Liguria. Promoted to Prima Divisione.; 1934–1935 – 1st in the group D of Prima Divisione, last in the final round B.; 1935–36 – 1st in the group C of Serie Con a par with Spezia. It wins 1–0 the tie-breakers for promotion, but was canceled because of technical error, and then renounce the repeat play, remaining in Serie C.; 1936–37 – 1st in the group C of Serie C. Promoted to Serie B.; 1937–38 – 9th in Serie B.; 1938–39 – 11th in Serie B.; 1939–40 – 17th in Serie B. Relegated to Serie C.; 1940–41 – 2nd in the group D of Serie C.; 1941–42 – 8th in the group D of Serie C.; 1942–43 – 5th in the group E of Serie C.; 1943–45: Not played for the Second World War.; 1945–46 – Plays in the regional league; 1946–47 – 2nd in the final round of group A of Lega Nord of Serie C.; 1947–48 – 3rd in the group A of Lega Nord of Serie C.; 1948–49 – 4th in the group A of Serie C.; 1949–50 – 3rd in the group A of Serie C.; 1950–51 – 2nd in the group A of Serie C.; 1951–52 – 2nd in the group A of Serie C.; 1952–53 – 4th in Serie C.; 1953–54 – 4th in Serie C.; 1954–55 – 6th in Serie C.; 1955–56 – 6th in Serie C.; 1956–57 – 12th in Serie C.; 1957–58 – 18th in Serie C.; 1958–59 – 8th in the group A of Serie C.; 1959–60 – 8th in the group A of Serie C.; 1960–61 – 11th in the group A of Serie C.; 1961–62 – 8th in the group A of Serie C.; 1962–63 – 18th in the group A of Serie C. Relegated to Serie D.; 1963–64 – 9th in the group A of Serie D.; 1964–65 – 14th in the group A of Serie D.; 1965–66 – 7th in the group A of Serie D.; 1966–67 – 4th in the group A of Serie D.; 1967–68 – 4th in the group A of Serie D.; 1968–69 – 10th in the group A of Serie D.; 1969–70 – 17th in the group A of Serie D. Relegated to Promozione Liguria.; 1970–71 – 2nd in the group A of Promozione Liguria.; 1971–72 – 12th in the group A of Promozione Liguria.; 1972–73 – 10th in the group A of Promozione Liguria.; 1973–74 – 2nd in the group A of Promozione Liguria.; 1974–75 – 1st in the group A of Promozione Liguria. Promoted to Serie D.; 1975–76 – 6th in the group A of Serie D.; 1976–77 – 13th in the group A of Serie D.; 1977–78 – 5th in the group A of Serie D. Admitted to Serie C2.; 1978–79 – 1st in the group A of Serie C2. Promoted to Serie C1.; 1979–80 – 4th in the group A of Serie C1.; 1980–81 – 8th in the group A of Serie C1. It played the Anglo-Italian Cup.; 1981–82 – 11th in the group A of Serie C1.; 1982–83 – 12th in the group A of Serie C1.; 1983–84 – 14th th in the group A of Serie C1.	1984–85 – 12th in the group A of Serie C1.; 1985–86 – 18th in the group A of Serie C1. Relegated to Serie C2.; 1986–87 – 17th in the group A of Serie C2.; 1987 – The company fouls and was refounded allocating by the Terza Categoria as Sanremese Football Club 1904.; 1987–88 – 1st in Terza Categoria Imperia.; 1988–89 – 1st in the group A of Seconda Categoria Liguria.; 1989–90 – 1st in the group A of Prima Categoria Liguria.; 1990–91 – 3rd in the group A of Promozione Liguria. Promoted to Eccellenza Liguria.; 1991–92 – 1st in Eccellenza Liguria. Promossa to CND.; 1992–93 – With the merger with Sanremo 80, it filming the historic name of U.S. Sanremese Calcio 1904. 10th in the group C of Campionato Nazionale Dilettanti.; 1993–94 – 17th in the group A of Campionato Nazionale Dilettanti. Relegated to Eccellenza Liguria.; 1994–95 – 9th in Eccellenza Liguria.; 1995–96 – 1st in Eccellenza Liguria. Promoted to CND. Wins the Regional Coppa Italia Liguria; 1996–97 – 3rd in the group A of Campionato Nazionale Dilettanti.; 1997–98 – 1st in the group A of Campionato Nazionale Dilettanti. Promoted to Serie C2, lost in the amateur final scudetto with the Giugliano.; 1998–99 – 10th in the group A of Serie C2.; 1999-00 – 18th in the group A of Serie C2. Relegated to Serie D.; 2000–01 – 11th th in the group A of Serie D.; 2001–02 – 5th in the group A of Serie D.; 2002–03 – 4th in the group E of Serie D. 2nd in the promotion play-off.; 2003–04 – 2nd in the group E of Serie D. Wins the promotion play-off with Sestese and Lavagnese. Admitted Serie C2.; 2004–05 – 6th in the group A of Serie C2.; 2005–06 – 7th in the group A of Serie C2. Lost the final Coppa Italia Serie C with the Gallipoli.; 2006–07 – 18th in the group A of Serie C2. Relegated to Serie D.; 2007–08 – 16th in the group A of Serie D. Lost the relegation playout against Casale and relegated.; 2008 – On 10 July 2008, the club was declared inactive to the FIGC after being refused entry to the League of Eccellenza, because of the large debts. In summer 2008, the last president Carlo Barillà refounded the team with the same name of U.S.D. Sanremese 1904, that played in the season 2008–09 in Seconda Categoria.; 2008–09 – 10th in Seconda Categoria.; 2009–10- On 4 August 2009 the Ospedaletti-Sanremo, just promoted from the Promozione Ligure girone A, after the agreement with Carlo Barillà for the cessation of the homonymous team that he was founded, changes name in U.S.D. Sanremese Calcio 1904. It wins the regional Eccellenza Liguria gaining promotion in Serie D and the Regional Coppa Italia Liguria:. It eliminated in the Coppa Italia Dilettanti 2009-2010 from Bolzano, in the quarter-finals losing for 1–2 at home and equalizing 0–0 away.; 2010 -On 4 August 2010 became U.S. Sanremese Calcio 1904 the team obtained the admission directly in Lega Pro Seconda Divisione.; 2010–2011 – 16th of Lega Pro Seconda Divisione. Wins the relegation play-out against Sacilese Calcio for 2–1 at home and 1–1 away. Excluded from Lega Pro due to severe financial issues.; 2011 – The company was liquidated.; 2012 – The club was refounded allocating by the Terza Categoria as A.S.D. Sanremese.; 2012–13 – 2nd in Terza Categoria Savona/Imperia. Promoted to repechage in Seconda Categoria.; 2013–14 – 2° in Seconda Categoria Liguria girone AB.; 2014–15 – ° in Prima Categoria Liguria girone A.

== Italian Football Championship ==
The U.S. Sanremese Calcio 1904 has played 60 national leagues:

- 3 times in Serie B: the first on 1937–38, the last on 1939–40
- 38 times in Lega Pro: the first on 1934–35, the last on 2010–11
- 19 times in Serie D: the first on 1963–64, the last on 2007–08.

== Colors and badge ==
The team's colors are light blue and white, the second shirt is red.

== Stadio Comunale ==
The A.S.D. Sanremese such as the historic U.S. Sanremese Calcio 1904 played at the Stadio Comunale of Sanremo, site in Corso Mazzini 15.

In the 2012–13 season had played here in Promozione Liguria girone A the A.S.D. Carlin's Boys, team founded in 1947 by the co-founder Carlo Carcano and currently main team of the city.

The stadium has the grass field and a capacity of around 4,000 seats:

- 850 in covered tribune
- 2250 in hailstorm: 1050 in the upper ring, 1200 in than lower
- 850 in the area for the guests
- 8 in the balcony floor for the reporters and three locations for the cameras.

== Honours ==
- Serie C:
  - Winners: Serie C 1936-37, Serie C 1946-47 group A (Note: Second in the final round A of the Northern of Serie C: it is non-promoted in Serie B.)
- Serie C2:
  - Winner: Serie C2 1978–79
- Serie D:
  - Promoted: 1997–98
  - National Runners-up: 1997–98
- Eccellenza Liguria:
  - Winners: 1991–92, 1995–96, 2009–10
- Coppa Italia Serie C:
  - Runners-up: 2005–06
- Coppa Italia Dilettanti:
  - Winners: 2015–16
- Regional Coppa Italia Liguria:
  - Winners: 1995–96, 2009–10
