= Altin Hoxha =

Albanian footballer (born 1990)

Personal information
- Full name: Altin Hoxha
- Date of birth: 21 October 1990 (age 36)
- Place of birth: Durrës, Albania
- Position: Midfielder

Team information
- Current team: Centese

Youth career
- Teuta

Senior career*
Years	Team	Apps	(Gls)
2009–2014	Teuta	97	(2)
2014	→ Besa (loan)	1	(0)
2014–2015	Besëlidhja	23	(5)
2016	Korabi	7	(0)
2016–2017	Montegiorgio Calcio		
2017–2018	Helvia Recina 1975		
2019–2021	US Campagnola		
2021–	Centese		

International career
2008–2009	Albania U19	0	(0)
2010–2012	Albania U21	5	(1)
- * Club domestic league appearances and goals as of 15 May 2016

Altin Hoxha (born 21 October 1990) is an Albanian footballer who plays for Italian club Centese.

== Career ==
=== Club career ===
In the summer 2015, Hoxha was set to sign with Italian Serie D club Fermana FC. Hoxha played two friendly games for the club and was offered a contract. While waiting for his work permit, Hoxha was training with his former club Teuta. However, he never got the work permit, why he signed with Korabi in 2016.

In the 2016–17 season, Hoxha returned to Italy, and played for Eccellenza club Montegiorgio Calcio. In the 2017–18 season, he played for Helvia Recina 1975.

After two season at US Campagnola, Hoxha moved to Centese in July 2021.
