= 1953–54 Serie C =

The 1953–54 Serie C was the sixteenth edition of Serie C, the third highest league in the Italian football league system.

== Final classification ==
Pos	Team	Pld	W	D	L	GF	GA	GD	Pts	Promotion or relegation
1	Parma (C, P)	34	17	9	8	45	23	+22	43	Promoted to Serie B
2	ArsenalTaranto (P)	34	19	5	10	50	36	+14	43	Promoted to Serie B
3	Venezia	34	14	14	6	36	29	+7	42	
4	Sanremese	34	14	11	9	49	34	+15	39	
5	Carbosarda	34	14	11	9	41	38	+3	39	
6	Lazio	34	13	12	9	42	36	+6	38	
7	Livorno	34	14	10	10	42	37	+5	38	
8	Catanzaro	34	15	7	12	50	41	+9	37	
9	Piacenza	34	14	8	12	63	42	+21	36	
10	Lecco	34	12	11	11	36	27	+9	35	
11	Empoli	34	11	12	11	37	35	+2	34	
12	Sambenedettese	34	12	10	12	40	40	0	34	
13	Siracusa	34	12	10	12	35	36	−1	34	
14	Carrarese	34	10	11	13	31	46	−15	31	
15	Toma Maglie (R)	34	11	6	17	41	58	−17	28	Relegated to IV Serie
16	Pisa (R)	34	7	8	19	31	66	−35	22	Relegated to IV Serie
17	Lucchese (R)	34	8	5	21	42	56	−14	21	Relegated to IV Serie
18	Mantova (R)	34	4	10	20	22	53	−31	17 (Note: 1 point deducted for a renouncement)	Relegated to IV Serie

Source: Panini
(C) Champions; (P) Promoted; (R) Relegated
