= A.S.D. Castnes 2020 =

Italian football club

- Full name: Associazione Sportiva Dilettantistica Castnes 2020
- Founded: 1919 (Panigal); 1966 (Casteldebole); 2007 (Casteldebole Panigal); 2014 (Borgo Panigale)
- Ground: Stadio Guerrino Negrini, Bologna; Campo Sterlino (former)
Home colours	Away colours

A.S.D. Castnes 2020 is an Italian association football club located in Borgo Panigale, a suburb of Bologna.

== History ==
The club was founded in 1919 as Società Sportiva Panigal.

In 1939, the club changed its name to Società Sportiva Panigale and later to Associazione Calcio Panigale.

In the 1942–43 Serie C season, the club finished second and, after taking part to the Campionato Alta Italia 1944, was admitted to the Serie B–C Alta Italia 1945–46. The club, however, finished last and was immediately relegated to Serie C. In the 1947–48 season the club finished 10th in Serie C and, due to reform of the championship, was relegated to Promozione, never appearing in a professional division again.

In the 1960s, the club reverted to its original name.

In 2007, the club merged with A.S.D. Casteldebole 1966, changing its denomination to A.S.D. Casteldebole Panigal 1919 (Associazione Sportiva Dilettantistica).

For the start of the 2014/15 season the club was renamed again to Borgo Panigale. F.C. before changing to its current title A.S.D. Castnes 2020 in 2020.

Former crest as Casteldebole Panigal 1919

Former crest as Borgo Panigal
