= Suzzara Sport Club =

Italian football club

Suzzara
- Full name: Suzzara Sport Club
- Founded: 1919; 2000 (refounded)
- Ground: Stadio Italo Allodi, Suzzara, Italy
- Chairman: Luca Rossi
- League: Promotion Lombardy/D
- 2019–20: Promotion Lombardy – B, 4th
Home colours	Away colours

Suzzara Sport Club is an Italian association football club located in Suzzara, Lombardy. It currently plays in Promozione. Its colors are white and black.

The club was first founded in 1919 and spent 2 seasons in Serie B.
