= Pro Palazzolo SSD =

Association football club in Italy

Pro Palazzolo
- Club badge of Pro Palozzolo
- Full name: Pro Palazzolo Società Sportiva Dilettantistica
- Founded: 1913; 1989 (refounded); 1998 (refounded); 2015 (refounded); 2023 as present-day Pro Palazzolo
- Ground: Stadio Comunale, Palazzolo sull'Oglio, Italy
- Capacity: 6,000
- Chairman: Claudio Forlani
- Manager: Mauro Belotti
- League: Serie D
- 2025–26: Serie D/D, 5th (qualified for wild card play-off)
- Website: www.propalazzolo.com
Home colours	Away colours

Pro Palazzolo Società Sportiva Dilettantistica, commonly referred to as just Pro Palazzolo, is an Italian association football club located in Palazzolo sull'Oglio, Lombardy. It currently plays in Serie D.

== History ==
It was founded in 1913.

Between 1989 (when it acquired the sports title of G.S. Telgate of Telgate) and 1996, the club played a total of four seasons in Serie C1 and three in Serie C2.

After a long but steady decline, the club, under the new denomination of Pro Palazzolo, climbed back up the league pyramid from 2015 onwards and was admitted to Serie D in 2023 after acquiring the sports title of Franciacorta.

== Colours and badge ==
Pro Palazzolo's main color is sky blue.
