= AC Magenta =

Italian football club

Magenta
- Full name: Associazione Calcio Magenta
- Nicknames: Gialloblù (yellow-blue); Aquile (eagle)
- Founded: 1945
- Ground: Stadio Comunale Commendator Francesco Plodari, Magenta, Italy
- Capacity: 500
- Chairman: Emiliano Cofrancesco
- Manager: Maurizio Ganz
- League: Eccellenza Lombardia
- 2024–25: Serie D/B, 17th (relegated)
Home colours	Away colours

Associazione Calcio Magenta is an Italian association football club located in Magenta, Lombardy. It currently plays in Eccellenza Lombardia. Its colors are blue and yellow.

The club was founded in 1945 and spent the 1947–48 season in Serie B North.
