= FC Bolzano 1996 =

Italian football club

- Full name: Football Club Bolzano 1996
- Nickname(s): Biancorossi (The Red & White), Aquile (The Eagles)
- Founded: 1931; 94 years ago as Associazione Calcio Bolzano; 1933 (refounded); 1937 (refounded); 1996 (refounded)
- Dissolved: 26 May 2017; 8 years ago (merged)
- Ground: Stadio Druso
- Capacity: 5,539
- 2014–15: Promozione/Bolzano, 10th
- Website: https://www.fcbolzano96.it/
Home colours	Away colours

Football Club Bolzano 1996, commonly known as FC Bolzano or simply Bolzano (pronounced [bolˈtsaːno]), was an Italian football club based in Bolzano, Trentino-Alto Adige/Südtirol. The club last competed in Promozione, the sixth tier of the Italian football league system, before merging in 2015 with Associazione Sportiva Dilettantistica Virtus Don Bosco, to form a new club called ASDC Virtus Bolzano. After the merger, the club did not dissolve immediately, continuing to operate its youth sector until 2017.

Founded as a football-only club in 1931 and known by its final name since 1996, FC Bolzano eventually expanded its activities to include other sports over the years. It was the first club from Trentino-Alto Adige/Südtirol to compete in Serie B, the second tier of Italian football, although never during the era of a round-robin tournament. Until the 2022–23 season — when FC Südtirol made its debut in Serie B — no other team from the region had matched this achievement. For this reason, FC Bolzano held the most prominent footballing tradition in the region for over seventy years.

== Honours ==
- Serie C
  - Champions (1): 1946–47
