= Centese Calcio =

Association football club

Centese
- Full name: Centese Calcio Associazione Sportiva Dilettantistica
- Founded: 1913 (A.C. Centese)
- Ground: Stadio Loris Bulgarelli, Cento, Italy
- Capacity: 4,500
- Chairman: Alberto Tino Fava
- Manager: Mario Lega
- League: Prima Categoria
- Website: www.asdcentesecalcio.com
Home colours	Away colours

Centese Calcio Associazione Sportiva Dilettantistica (commonly referred to as Centese) is an Italian association football club located in Cento, Emilia-Romagna. It currently plays in Promozione. Its colors are blue and white.

The current club took the place of the historical Associazione Calcio Centese that went bankrupt in 2016. The club was formerly known as Centese Calcio .

Centese spent the 1947–48 season in Serie B North.
