= ASD Fanfulla =

Italian football club

Fanfulla
- Full name: Associazione Sportiva Dilettantistica Fanfulla
- Nickname: Guerriero (Warrior)
- Founded: 1874 (as multisports club); 1908 (football department); 2015 (refounded)
- Ground: Stadio Dossenina, Lodi, Italy
- Capacity: 2,184
- Chairman: Alessandro Tufo
- Manager: Alberto Cuomo
- League: Eccellenza Lombardia
- 2024–25: Serie D/B, 18th (relegated)
- Website: https://www.asdfanfulla.it/
Home colours	Away colours

Associazione Sportiva Dilettantistica Fanfulla is an Italian association football club located in Lodi, Lombardy. The club name comes from Bartolomeo Fanfulla from Lodi, one of 13 Italian knights who defeated the French in the challenge of Barletta in 1503. For this reason the Lodi team is also called Guerriero (warrior in Italian) by its supporters.

In 1974 the club was awarded the Gold Star for sports merits.

Fanfulla, one of the oldest football and sports clubs in Italy, was founded on 18 October 1874 as a multisports club under the denomination Società Lodigiana di Ginnastica e Scherma (Lodi club of gymnastics and fencing), and its football department was founded in 1908. Fanfulla played 13 Serie B leagues during the 1940s and the 1950s, and now plays in fifth-tier Eccellenza. Its colors are black and white.

== Honours ==
- Coppa Italia Serie C: 1
  - Winners: 1983–84
