= Atletico Piombino =

Italian football club

- Full name: Atletico Piombino
- Founded: 1921; 104 years ago
- Ground: Stadio Magona, Piombino, Italy
- Capacity: 2.500
- Chairman: Massimiliano Spagnesi
- Manager: Massimiliano Miano
- League: Eccellenza – Toscana
Home colours	Away colours

Atletico Piombino is an Italian association football club located in Piombino, Tuscany. It currently plays in Eccellenza. Its colors are light blue and black.

== History ==
The club was founded in 1921 as U.S. Piombino Calcio and spent three seasons in Serie B in which it defeated more famous teams such as A.S.Roma and Calcio Catania. The side disbanded in 1996 and was refounded as A.S. Piombino. It changed its denomination to the current one in 2004, but from the fans it's called as only "il Piombino". Piombino actually play in Eccellenza Toscana, the fifth level of Italian football.
