= Vigevano Calcio =

Association football club

Vigevano
- Full name: Vigevano Calcio S.r.l.
- Founded: 1921
- Ground: Stadio Dante Merlo, Vigevano, Italy
- Capacity: 3,000
- Chairman: Demetrio Sartiano
- Manager: David Sassarini
- League: Eccellenza Lombardy
- 2010–11: Serie D/A, 18th (relegated)
Home colours	Away colours

Vigevano Calcio, commonly referred to as Vigevano, is an Italian football club based in Vigevano, Lombardy.

In the season 2010–11, from Serie D group A relegated to Eccellenza Lombardy.

Its colors are light blue and white.

Previously known as Giovani Calciatori Vigevanesi (English: Young Vigevanese Footballers), the team took part in 11 Serie B seasons, mainly in the 1930s and 1940s.
