= 1971–72 Serie C =

The 1971–72 Serie C was the thirty-fourth edition of Serie C, the third highest league in the Italian football league system.

== Girone A ==
Serie C Gir. A 1971-72 team distribution
Serie C Gir. B 1971-72 team distribution
Serie C Gir. B 1971-72 team distribution in Tuscany
Serie C Gir. C 1971-72 team distribution
Serie C Gir. C 1971-72 team distribution in Campania

Pos	Team	Pld	W	D	L	GF	GA	GD	Pts	Promotion or relegation
1	Lecco (P)	38	18	15	5	48	24	+24	51	Promoted to Serie B
2	Alessandria	38	14	19	5	36	25	+11	47	
3	Udinese	38	16	14	8	44	28	+16	46	
4	Solbiatese	38	15	15	8	41	29	+12	45	
5	Cremonese	38	13	18	7	33	25	+8	44	
6	Verbania	38	14	12	12	37	24	+13	40	
7	Venezia	38	14	12	12	41	35	+6	40	
8	Trento	38	11	18	9	35	32	+3	40	
9	Padova	38	14	11	13	45	40	+5	39	
10	Legnano	38	10	19	9	28	28	0	39	
11	Belluno	38	12	14	12	32	40	−8	38	
12	Savona	38	11	15	12	28	32	−4	37	
13	Derthona	38	12	12	14	35	43	−8	36	
14	Piacenza	38	9	16	13	31	36	−5	34	
15	Rovereto	38	7	19	12	27	31	−4	33	
16	Seregno	38	9	15	14	24	31	−7	33	
17	Pro Vercelli	38	10	12	16	36	46	−10	32	
18	Treviso (R)	38	7	18	13	20	31	−11	32 (Note: Relegated for goal difference.)	Relegated to Serie D
19	Imperia (R)	38	7	13	18	25	45	−20	27	Relegated to Serie D
20	Pro Patria (R)	38	7	13	18	18	39	−21	27	Relegated to Serie D

Source: Panini
(P) Promoted; (R) Relegated

== Girone B ==
Pos	Team	Pld	W	D	L	GF	GA	GD	Pts	Promotion or relegation
1	Ascoli (P)	38	23	12	3	64	20	+44	58	Promoted to Serie B
2	Parma	38	17	16	5	48	26	+22	50	
3	S.P.A.L.	38	15	16	7	47	29	+18	46	
4	Sambenedettese	38	15	16	7	40	23	+17	46	
5	Massese	38	12	20	6	36	28	+8	44	
6	Prato	38	13	15	10	32	27	+5	41	
7	Lucchese	38	11	17	10	39	35	+4	39	
8	Rimini	38	13	13	12	46	50	−4	39	
9	Olbia	38	12	14	12	28	33	−5	38	
10	Viareggio	38	10	17	11	48	53	−5	37	
11	Empoli	38	9	18	11	35	33	+2	36	
12	Spezia	38	8	20	10	30	32	−2	36	
13	Viterbese	38	12	12	14	34	42	−8	36	
14	Pisa	38	9	17	12	30	31	−1	35	
15	Anconitana	38	11	12	15	39	43	−4	34	
16	Giulianova	38	8	18	12	29	38	−9	34	
17	Maceratese	38	11	10	17	30	43	−13	32	
18	Sangiovannese (R)	38	9	12	17	22	35	−13	30	Relegated to Serie D
19	Imola (R)	38	9	11	18	29	56	−27	29	Relegated to Serie D
20	Entella (R)	38	2	16	20	23	52	−29	20	Relegated to Serie D

(P) Promoted; (R) Relegated

== Girone C ==
Pos	Team	Pld	W	D	L	GF	GA	GD	Pts	Promotion or relegation
1	Brindisi (P)	38	21	13	4	53	16	+37	55	Promoted to Serie B
2	Lecce	38	16	18	4	36	20	+16	50	
3	Trani	38	17	12	9	40	25	+15	46	
4	Salernitana	38	16	12	10	41	30	+11	44	
5	Pro Vasto	38	14	15	9	26	23	+3	43	
6	Casertana	38	16	8	14	35	31	+4	40	
7	Frosinone	38	13	13	12	24	24	0	39	
8	Turris	38	13	12	13	38	28	+10	38	
9	Messina	38	12	14	12	37	38	−1	38	
10	Matera	38	12	13	13	33	31	+2	37	
11	Chieti	38	13	11	14	38	40	−2	37	
12	Avellino	38	9	18	11	33	30	+3	36	
13	Cosenza	38	11	14	13	28	34	−6	36	
14	Potenza	38	12	12	14	34	42	−8	36	
15	Acquapozzillo	38	10	15	13	24	26	−2	35	
16	Siracusa	38	9	17	12	31	39	−8	35	
17	Crotone	38	10	15	13	23	34	−11	35	
18	Pescara (R)	38	9	16	13	32	34	−2	34	Relegated to Serie D
19	Martina (R)	38	9	13	16	29	45	−16	31	Relegated to Serie D
20	Savoia (R)	38	4	7	27	10	55	−45	15	Relegated to Serie D

(P) Promoted; (R) Relegated

== References and sources ==
- Almanacco Illustrato del Calcio – La Storia 1898–2004, Panini Edizioni, Modena, September 2005
