= Mario Tontodonati =

Italian footballer

Personal information
- Date of birth: August 31, 1923
- Place of birth: Scafa, Italy
- Date of death: June 24, 2009 (aged 85)
- Place of death: Fontecchio, Italy
- Position: Striker

Senior career*
Years	Team	Apps	(Gls)
1937–1940	Simaz Popoli		
1940–1943	Pescara	90	(31)
1944–1946	Pescara		
1946–1948	Bari	77	(16)
1948–1951	Roma	90	(28)
1951–1952	Lucchese	30	(7)
1952–1953	Torino	9	(0)
1953–1959	Pescara		
1965–1966	Pescara	1	(0)
- * Club domestic league appearances and goals

Mario Tontodonati (August 31, 1923 in Scafa – June 24, 2009 in Fontecchio) was an Italian professional football player. He played for 7 seasons (206 games, 51 goals) in the Serie A for A.S. Bari, A.S. Roma, A.S. Lucchese Libertas 1905 and A.C. Torino.

== Professional career ==
In September 1948, Tontodonati was initially acquired by Inter alongside Tommaso Maestrelli, but he was immediately transferred to Roma under manager Fulvio Bernardini as part of the deal that sent Amedeo Amadei to Milan.

Tontodonati scored in the ninth minute on his debut for Roma against Bologna in the opening match of the season. He added two goals in his second appearance, scoring in the 10th and 68th minutes of a 4–2 win over Triestina, helping Roma start the season with consecutive victories.

Roma were defeated 4–0 in their third match and ultimately finished the season in 14th place. Tontodonati was the club's leading scorer that season and continued to be a regular contributor over the following two years. He left the club after the 1950–51 season, during which Roma were relegated for the first time in their history.
