= 1972–73 Serie D =

Serie D
- Season: 1972–73
- Promoted: Gaviese; Bolzano; Clodiasottomarina; Riccione; Grosseto; Latina; Nocerina; Pescara; Marsala
- Relegated: Ivrea (repecheaged); Juventus Domo; Arona; Cisanese; Guastalla; Sassuolo; Torvis Snia; San Donà; Alense; Faenza; Serenissima; Sangiorgese; R.M. Firenze (repecheaged); Sarzanese; Libertas Tavarnelle; Palestrina; Tevere Roma; Guspini; Battipagliese; Pomigliano; Savoia; Gallipoli; Poggiardo; Audace Cerignola; Nicastro; Avola; AMAT Palermo

The 1972–73 Serie D was the twenty-third edition of Serie D, the fourth highest league in the Italian football league system.

A total of 162 teams contested the league, divided into nine groups (in Italian: Gironi) of 18 teams.

== League tables ==
=== Girone A ===
Pos	Team	Pld	W	D	L	GF	GA	GD	Pts	Promotion, qualification or relegation
1	Gaviese (C, P)	34	19	12	3	53	21	+32	50	Promotion to Serie C
2	Albese	34	18	11	5	54	24	+30	47	
3	Ignis Varese	34	15	13	6	43	23	+20	43	
4	Imperia	34	15	10	9	35	27	+8	40	
5	Pro Patria	34	12	15	7	38	28	+10	39	
6	Asti Macobi	34	9	17	8	26	25	+1	35	
7	Borgosesia	34	12	11	11	34	34	0	35	
8	Omegna	34	8	18	8	32	28	+4	34	
9	Albenga	34	9	16	9	30	32	−2	34	
10	Canelli	34	11	11	12	39	41	−2	33	
11	Biellese	34	9	15	10	28	34	−6	33	
12	Novese	34	9	14	11	33	32	+1	32	
13	Istituto Sociale Cafasse	34	12	7	15	34	37	−3	31	
14	Borgomanero	34	7	17	10	23	27	−4	31	
15	Casale	34	7	17	10	25	34	−9	31	
16	Ivrea (Note: Ivrea were relegated to 1973–74 Promozione, but they were later admitted to 1973–74 Serie D through repechage.)	34	9	9	16	29	49	−20	27	Relegation to Promozione
17	Juventus Domo (R)	34	5	12	17	28	57	−29	22	Relegation to Promozione
18	Arona (R)	34	5	5	24	19	50	−31	15	Relegation to Promozione

Updated to match(es) played on May 1973. Source: CalcioDiEccellenza.it
(C) Champions; (P) Promoted; (R) Relegated

=== Girone B ===
Pos	Team	Pld	W	D	L	GF	GA	GD	Pts	Promotion, qualification or relegation
1	Bolzano (C, P)	34	18	14	2	45	14	+31	50	Promotion to Serie C
2	Melzo	34	18	12	4	40	22	+18	48	
3	Carpi	34	13	15	6	36	22	+14	41	
4	Pergolettese	34	14	13	7	35	22	+13	41	
5	Romanese	34	9	17	8	38	35	+3	35	
6	Anaune	34	9	16	9	32	25	+7	34	
7	Crema	34	13	8	13	40	36	+4	34	
8	Oltisarco	34	11	12	11	37	34	+3	34	
9	Trevigliese	34	11	12	11	35	36	−1	34	
10	Meda 1913	34	12	10	12	30	38	−8	34	
11	Fanfulla	34	11	11	12	32	34	−2	33	
12	San Giorgio Sassuolo	34	8	16	10	27	23	+4	32	
13	Arco	34	9	13	12	21	27	−6	31	
14	Pro Sesto	34	9	12	13	22	25	−3	30	
15	Pavia	34	8	14	12	28	37	−9	30	
16	Cisanese (R)	34	6	15	13	16	30	−14	27	Relegation to Promozione
17	Guastalla (R)	34	6	13	15	24	45	−21	25	Relegation to Promozione
18	Sassuolo (R)	34	4	11	19	24	57	−33	19	Relegation to Promozione

Updated to match(es) played on May 1973. Source: CalcioDiEccellenza.it
(C) Champions; (P) Promoted; (R) Relegated

=== Girone C ===
Pos	Team	Pld	W	D	L	GF	GA	GD	Pts	Promotion, qualification or relegation
1	Clodiasottomarina (C, P)	34	22	8	4	49	24	+25	52	Promotion to Serie C
2	Treviso	34	17	10	7	37	16	+21	44	
3	Mestrina	34	17	9	8	47	21	+26	43	
4	Adriese	34	13	15	6	27	18	+9	41	
5	Audace	34	12	15	7	33	27	+6	39	
6	Montebelluna	34	12	13	9	36	33	+3	37	
7	Bassano Virtus	34	13	11	10	27	25	+2	37	
8	Portogruaro	34	11	11	12	33	26	+7	33	
9	Malo	34	10	13	11	36	36	0	33	
10	Pordenone	34	11	10	13	34	36	−2	32	
11	Rovigo	34	12	7	15	28	35	−7	31	
12	Monfalcone	34	6	18	10	17	26	−9	30	
13	Coneglianese	34	7	15	12	25	34	−9	29	
14	Legnago	34	8	12	14	33	39	−6	28	
15	Pro Gorizia	34	9	10	15	32	43	−11	28	
16	Torvis Snia (R)	34	8	10	16	18	37	−19	26	Relegation to Promozione
17	San Donà (R)	34	7	11	16	32	42	−10	25	Relegation to Promozione
18	Alense (R)	34	7	10	17	22	48	−26	24	Relegation to Promozione

Updated to match(es) played on May 1973. Source: CalcioDiEccellenza.it
(C) Champions; (P) Promoted; (R) Relegated

=== Girone D ===
Pos	Team	Pld	W	D	L	GF	GA	GD	Pts	Promotion, qualification or relegation
1	Riccione (C, P)	34	20	10	4	43	19	+24	50	Promotion to Serie C
2	Bellaria	34	17	16	1	50	16	+34	50	
3	Cattolica	34	14	14	6	36	23	+13	42	
4	Forlì	34	15	9	10	36	25	+11	39	
5	Spoleto	34	11	16	7	32	22	+10	38	
6	Città di Castello	34	12	14	8	37	31	+6	38	
7	Imola	34	13	11	10	34	25	+9	37	
8	Fermana	34	12	11	11	38	33	+5	35	
9	Pergolese	34	10	14	10	26	28	−2	34	
10	Gubbio	34	10	11	13	37	40	−3	31	
11	Foligno	34	10	11	13	33	37	−4	31	
12	Baracca Lugo	34	9	13	12	29	34	−5	31	
13	Civitanovese	34	9	13	12	32	40	−8	31	
14	Fano	34	8	13	13	21	27	−6	29	
15	Jesi	34	8	12	14	30	44	−14	28	
16	Faenza (R)	34	7	11	16	24	45	−21	25	Relegation to Promozione
17	Serenissima (R)	34	8	7	19	18	42	−24	23	Relegation to Promozione
18	Sangiorgese (R)	34	4	12	18	20	45	−25	20	Relegation to Promozione

Updated to match(es) played on May 1973. Source: CalcioDiEccellenza.it
(C) Champions; (P) Promoted; (R) Relegated

==== Promotion play-offs ====
2 June 1973
Bellaria	0–1	Riccione	Stadio La Fiorita, Cesena

Riccione promoted to Serie C.

=== Girone E ===
Pos	Team	Pld	W	D	L	GF	GA	GD	Pts	Promotion, qualification or relegation
1	Grosseto (C, P)	34	20	10	4	47	19	+28	50	Promotion to Serie C
2	Siena	34	17	11	6	45	25	+20	45	
3	Pistoiese	34	10	20	4	28	17	+11	40	
4	Pontedera	34	13	12	9	34	27	+7	38	
5	Pietrasanta	34	13	11	10	44	33	+11	37	
6	Sangiovannese	34	12	12	10	30	25	+5	36	
7	Figline	34	11	13	10	28	27	+1	35	
8	Sansepolcro	34	11	13	10	28	29	−1	35	
9	Poggibonsi	34	11	12	11	32	26	+6	34	
10	Camaiore	34	11	10	13	32	33	−1	32	
11	Entella	34	11	10	13	39	40	−1	32	
12	Orbetello	34	10	12	12	27	31	−4	32	
13	Sestri Levante	34	11	9	14	34	37	−3	31	
14	Carrarese	34	7	17	10	20	26	−6	31	
15	Lerici	34	10	10	14	20	28	−8	30	
16	R.M. Firenze (Note: R.M. Firenze were initially relegated to Promozione due to the goal difference rule, but they were later admitted to 1973–74 Serie D through repechage.)	34	9	12	13	29	41	−12	30	Relegation to Promozione
17	Sarzanese (R)	34	7	12	15	22	34	−12	26	Relegation to Promozione
18	Libertas Tavarnelle (R)	34	4	10	20	25	56	−31	18	Relegation to Promozione

Updated to match(es) played on May 1973. Source: CalcioDiEccellenza.it
(C) Champions; (P) Promoted; (R) Relegated

=== Girone F ===
Pos	Team	Pld	W	D	L	GF	GA	GD	Pts	Promotion, qualification or relegation
1	Latina (C, P)	34	17	15	2	29	8	+21	49	Promotion to Serie C
2	VJS Velletri	34	13	15	6	29	20	+9	41	
3	L'Aquila	34	11	18	5	25	17	+8	40	
4	Cassino	34	12	15	7	43	27	+16	39	
5	ALMAS	34	12	15	7	39	28	+11	39	
6	Orvietana	34	11	17	6	35	24	+11	39	
7	Civitavecchia	34	13	12	9	39	25	+14	38	
8	STEFER Roma	34	10	17	7	30	26	+4	37	
9	OMI Roma	34	12	12	10	23	20	+3	36	
10	Nuorese	34	9	17	8	17	18	−1	35	
11	Alatri	34	9	15	10	32	32	0	33	
12	Monteponi Iglesias	34	9	14	11	29	27	+2	32	
13	Alghero	34	10	11	13	25	28	−3	31	
14	Romulea	34	8	14	12	25	34	−9	30	
15	Sora	34	6	16	12	16	33	−17	28	
16	Palestrina (R)	34	6	13	15	23	40	−17	25	Relegation to Promozione
17	Tevere Roma (R)	34	4	15	15	17	38	−21	23	Relegation to Promozione
18	Guspini (R)	34	5	7	22	22	53	−31	17	Relegation to Promozione

Updated to match(es) played on May 1973. Source: CalcioDiEccellenza.it
(C) Champions; (P) Promoted; (R) Relegated

=== Girone G ===
Pos	Team	Pld	W	D	L	GF	GA	GD	Pts	Promotion, qualification or relegation
1	Nocerina (C, P)	34	16	17	1	37	15	+22	49	Promotion to Serie C
2	Benevento	34	18	11	5	45	12	+33	47	
3	Pro Salerno	34	19	9	6	52	26	+26	47	
4	Castrovillari	34	14	11	9	33	31	+2	39	
5	Campobasso	34	10	14	10	22	23	−1	34	
6	Sessana	34	11	12	11	37	38	−1	34	
7	Palmese	34	12	9	13	36	28	+8	33	
8	Terzigno	34	12	9	13	32	33	−1	33	
9	Cavese	34	11	11	12	34	37	−3	33	
10	Puteolana	34	10	13	11	28	32	−4	33	
11	Lavello	34	9	13	12	30	38	−8	31	
12	Flacco Venosa	34	12	7	15	26	36	−10	31	
13	Portici	34	10	11	13	22	40	−18	31	
14	Ischia Isolaverde	34	10	10	14	34	32	+2	30	
15	Paganese	34	9	12	13	32	31	+1	30	
16	Battipagliese (R)	34	7	14	13	27	33	−6	28	Relegation to Promozione
17	Pomigliano (R)	34	8	11	15	23	39	−16	27	Relegation to Promozione
18	Savoia (R)	34	7	8	19	24	50	−26	22	Relegation to Promozione

Updated to match(es) played on May 1973. Source: CalcioDiEccellenza.it
(C) Champions; (P) Promoted; (R) Relegated

=== Girone H ===
Pos	Team	Pld	W	D	L	GF	GA	GD	Pts	Promotion, qualification or relegation
1	Pescara (C, P)	34	21	10	3	49	18	+31	52	Promotion to Serie C
2	Teramo	34	19	10	5	48	22	+26	48	
3	Pro Lanciano	34	15	16	3	41	11	+30	46	
4	Nardò	34	15	14	5	44	25	+19	44	
5	Martina	34	17	9	8	45	19	+26	43	
6	Fasano	34	15	10	9	44	33	+11	40	
7	Monopoli	34	11	12	11	24	23	+1	34	
8	Santegidiese	34	9	16	9	34	33	+1	34	
9	Sulmona	34	9	14	11	36	36	0	32	
10	Termoli	34	10	12	12	22	28	−6	32	
11	Putignano	34	9	13	12	35	36	−1	31	
12	Angolana	34	8	14	12	25	33	−8	30	
13	Manduria	34	9	12	13	33	47	−14	30	
14	Fidelis Andria	34	7	15	12	29	35	−6	29	
15	Bitonto	34	7	12	15	22	36	−14	26	
16	Gallipoli (R)	34	6	13	15	16	37	−21	25	Relegation to Promozione
17	Poggiardo (R)	34	2	14	18	17	53	−36	18	Relegation to Promozione
18	Audace Cerignola (R)	34	2	14	18	12	51	−39	18	Relegation to Promozione

Updated to match(es) played on May 1973. Source: CalcioDiEccellenza.it
(C) Champions; (P) Promoted; (R) Relegated

=== Girone I ===
Pos	Team	Pld	W	D	L	GF	GA	GD	Pts	Promotion, qualification or relegation
1	Marsala (C, P)	34	20	9	5	42	15	+27	49	Promotion to Serie C
2	Leonzio	34	16	11	7	37	23	+14	43	
3	Milazzo	34	13	12	9	30	22	+8	38	
4	Massiminiana	34	13	12	9	29	33	−4	38	
5	Paternò	34	12	14	8	31	27	+4	38	
6	Enna	34	12	11	11	35	35	0	35	
7	Bagheria	34	11	13	10	32	33	−1	35	
8	Ragusa	34	11	13	10	29	30	−1	35	
9	Caltagirone	34	10	13	11	29	25	+4	33	
10	Palmi	34	11	11	12	39	40	−1	33	
11	Akragas	34	12	9	13	29	37	−8	33	
12	Gioiese	34	10	12	12	38	28	+10	32	
13	Nuova Igea	34	10	12	12	27	34	−7	32	
14	Folgore Castelvetrano	34	9	13	12	26	31	−5	31	
15	Cantieri Navali	34	10	11	13	27	33	−6	31	
16	Nicastro (R)	34	9	11	14	32	33	−1	29	Relegation to Promozione
17	Avola (R)	34	8	13	13	26	31	−5	29	Relegation to Promozione
18	AMAT Palermo (R)	34	4	10	20	18	56	−38	18	Relegation to Promozione

Updated to match(es) played on May 1973. Source: CalcioDiEccellenza.it
(C) Champions; (P) Promoted; (R) Relegated
