= 1988–89 Serie C2 =

Serie C2
- Season: 1988–89
- Champions: Casale; Chievo; Fidelis Andria; Campania Puteolana
- Promoted: Casale; Alessandria; Chievo; Carpi; Fidelis Andria; Ternana; Campania Puteolana; Siracusa
- Relegated: Ilva; Voghera; Sorso; Ospitaletto (repecheaged); Pordenone; Giorgione; Riccione (repecheaged); San Marino; Bisceglie (repecheaged); Sorrento; Benevento; Cynthia; Gela; Afragolese; Juve Stabia
- Matches played: 1,226

The 1988–89 Serie C2 was the eleventh edition of Serie C2, the fourth highest league in the Italian football league system.

A total of 72 teams contested the league, divided into four groups (in Italian: Gironi) of 18 teams.

== League tables ==
=== Girone A ===
Pos	Team	Pld	W	D	L	GF	GA	GD	Pts	Promotion, qualification or relegation
1	Casale (C, P)	34	16	16	2	33	13	+20	48	Promotion to Serie C1
2	Alessandria (P)	34	16	15	3	32	12	+20	47	Promotion to Serie C1
3	Siena	34	13	15	6	39	27	+12	41	
4	Pavia	34	13	14	7	25	21	+4	40	
5	Oltrepò	34	13	12	9	40	26	+14	38	
6	Poggibonsi	34	13	12	9	37	27	+10	38	
7	Massese '82 (Note: Massese '82 were docked 3 points.)	34	14	12	8	48	38	+10	37	
8	Pro Vercelli	34	11	14	9	29	27	+2	36	
9	Sarzanese	34	10	15	9	28	28	0	35	
10	Cecina	34	8	18	8	23	22	+1	34	
11	Olbia	34	7	19	8	20	21	−1	33	
12	Rondinella	34	9	12	13	29	31	−2	30	
13	Tempio	34	9	12	13	27	33	−6	30	
14	Pontedera	34	6	17	11	36	40	−4	29	
15	Cuoiopelli	34	5	19	10	18	28	−10	29	
16	Ilva (R)	34	9	10	15	35	35	0	28	Relegation to Interregionale
17	Vogherese (R)	34	9	10	15	31	44	−13	28	Relegation to Interregionale
18	Sorso (R)	34	1	6	27	16	73	−57	8	Relegation to Interregionale

Updated to match(es) played on 4 June 1989. Source: RSSSF.com
(C) Champions; (P) Promoted; (R) Relegated

=== Girone B ===
Pos	Team	Pld	W	D	L	GF	GA	GD	Pts	Promotion, qualification or relegation
1	Chievo (C, P)	34	18	12	4	41	15	+26	48	Promotion to Serie C1
2	Carpi	34	15	15	4	36	14	+22	45	Promotion to Serie C1
3	Legnano	34	16	8	10	41	26	+15	40	
4	Novara	34	12	16	6	27	18	+9	40	
5	Sassuolo	34	14	11	9	40	32	+8	39	
6	Forlì	34	10	16	8	27	18	+9	36	
7	Pro Sesto	34	8	20	6	22	20	+2	36	
8	Telgate	34	13	9	12	38	36	+2	35	
9	Ravenna	34	8	16	10	27	32	−5	32	
10	Varese	34	7	18	9	20	26	−6	32	
11	Suzzara	34	7	17	10	21	27	−6	31	
12	Treviso	34	7	17	10	22	30	−8	31	
13	Orceana	34	7	16	11	30	39	−9	30	
14	Pergocrema	34	9	12	13	31	41	−10	30	
15	Juventus Domo (O)	34	5	19	10	14	21	−7	29	Qualification to relegation play-offs
16	Ospitaletto (Note: Ospitaletto were relegated to 1989–90 Interregionale after losing relegation play-offs, but they were later admitted to 1989–90 Serie C2 through repechage.)	34	9	11	14	28	36	−8	29	Qualification to relegation play-offs
17	Pordenone (R)	34	8	11	15	23	38	−15	27	Relegation to Interregionale
18	Giorgione (R)	34	6	10	18	23	42	−19	22	Relegation to Interregionale

Updated to match(es) played on 4 June 1989. Source: RSSSF.com
(C) Champions; (O) Play-off winners; (P) Promoted; (R) Relegated

==== Relegation play-offs ====
	Result		Place and date
Juventus Domo	1–1 aet 7–6 p	Ospitaletto	Legnano, 11 June 1989

=== Girone C ===
Pos	Team	Pld	W	D	L	GF	GA	GD	Pts	Promotion, qualification or relegation
1	Fidelis Andria (C, P)	34	21	6	7	42	19	+23	48	Promotion to Serie C1
2	Ternana (O, P)	34	21	6	7	50	24	+26	48	Promotion to Serie C1
3	Chieti	34	18	12	4	43	24	+19	48	Qualification to promotion play-offs
4	Trani	34	15	11	8	35	22	+13	41	
5	Celano	34	14	11	9	24	20	+4	39	
6	Gubbio	34	11	12	11	28	23	+5	34	
7	Martina	34	11	11	12	32	29	+3	33	
8	Teramo	34	10	13	11	27	31	−4	33	
9	Fano	34	11	9	14	36	36	0	31	
10	Giulianova	34	9	13	12	29	32	−3	31	
11	Jesi	34	10	11	13	31	36	−5	31	
12	Lanciano	34	9	13	12	27	38	−11	31	
13	Fasano	34	8	13	13	27	35	−8	29	
14	Potenza	34	8	13	13	21	36	−15	29	
15	Civitanovese	34	10	9	15	22	38	−16	29	
16	Riccione (Note: Riccione were relegated to 1989–90 Interregionale, but they were later admitted to 1989–90 Serie C2 through repechage.)	34	7	13	14	22	30	−8	27	Relegation to Interregionale
17	San Marino (R)	34	7	12	15	30	37	−7	26	Relegation to Interregionale
18	Bisceglie (Note: Bisceglie were relegated to 1989–90 Interregionale, but they were later admitted to 1989–90 Serie C2 through repechage.)	34	5	14	15	22	38	−16	24	Relegation to Interregionale

Updated to match(es) played on 4 June 1989. Source: RSSSF.com
(C) Champions; (O) Play-off winners; (P) Promoted; (R) Relegated

==== Promotion play-offs ====
	Result		Place and date
Ternana	0–0 aet 3–1 p	Chieti	Cesena, 11 June 1989

=== Girone D ===
Pos	Team	Pld	W	D	L	GF	GA	GD	Pts	Promotion, qualification or relegation
1	Campania Puteolana (C, P)	34	19	11	4	44	13	+31	49	Promotion to Serie C1
2	Siracusa (P)	34	15	14	5	38	25	+13	44	Promotion to Serie C1
3	Cavese	34	13	17	4	29	15	+14	43	
4	Leonzio	34	12	13	9	33	26	+7	37	
5	Sorrento (Note: Sorrento were relegated to 1989–90 Interregionale due to financial problems.) (R)	34	12	12	10	35	33	+2	36	Relegation to Interregionale
6	Lodigiani	34	10	16	8	33	32	+1	36	
7	Nola	34	10	16	8	31	35	−4	36	
8	Crotone	34	10	15	9	36	32	+4	35	
9	Vigor Lamezia	34	11	12	11	28	32	−4	34	
10	Turris	34	11	11	12	37	43	−6	33	
11	Trapani	34	9	14	11	34	33	+1	32	
12	Latina	34	7	18	9	28	27	+1	32	
13	Battipagliese	34	7	18	9	30	36	−6	32	
14	Benevento (Note: Benevento were relegated to 1989–90 Interregionale due to financial problems.) (R)	34	7	16	11	27	29	−2	30	Relegation to Interregionale
15	Cynthia (Note: Cynthia were relegated to 1989–90 Interregionale due to financial problems.) (R)	34	9	12	13	28	33	−5	30	Relegation to Interregionale
16	Juventina Gela (R)	34	8	13	13	37	44	−7	29	Relegation to Interregionale
17	Afragolese (R)	34	4	15	15	25	43	−18	23	Relegation to Interregionale
18	Juve Stabia (R)	34	4	13	17	17	40	−23	21	Relegation to Interregionale

Updated to match(es) played on 4 June 1989. Source: RSSSF.com
(C) Champions; (P) Promoted; (R) Relegated
