= 1945–46 Serie B-C =

Italian football league season

Serie B-C North
- Season: 1945–46
- Champions: Alessandria; 1st title

This special Serie B-C championship was organized with geographical criteria with Serie B and the best Serie C teams from Northern Italy taking part. For this reason, it is not included in the statistics even if it was an official tournament.

Just after the Allied disbandment of the fascist Higher Directory, the major clubs from US-occupied Northern Italy replaced it by a provisional football league, the High Italy League (Lega Alta Italia), which organized the expanded local section of the Serie B.

Spezia asked to be admitted to Serie A. After the refusal of FIGC, Spezia decided to join the regional leagues. Ultimately, Spezia was admitted to Serie B in the following season.

== Teams ==
Northern Italy had 12 Serie B clubs: six regular and three re-admitted teams of the last pre-war season, and three clubs promoted from Serie C. However, newly-promoted Varese obtained a yearly break for huge wartime damages, while Spezia Calcio did not join.

All Serie C guests advancing to the final round were granted a titular Serie B licence.

Three groups were created: Western, Central and Eastern.

== Group A ==
=== Final classification ===
| Pos | Team | Pld | W | D | L | GF | GA | GR | Pts | Qualification or relegation |
|---|---|---|---|---|---|---|---|---|---|---|
| 1 | Alessandria (A) | 22 | 13 | 4 | 5 | 42 | 20 | 2.100 | 30 | Qualification to Final round |
| 1 | Vigevano (G, A, P) | 22 | 12 | 6 | 4 | 26 | 13 | 2.000 | 30 | Qualification to Final round |
| 3 | Pro Vercelli (G) | 22 | 11 | 5 | 6 | 32 | 23 | 1.391 | 27 | |
| 4 | Piacenza (G) | 22 | 12 | 2 | 8 | 44 | 36 | 1.222 | 26 | |
| 5 | Casale (G) | 22 | 10 | 4 | 8 | 36 | 27 | 1.333 | 24 | |
| 5 | Novara | 22 | 9 | 6 | 7 | 23 | 15 | 1.533 | 24 | |
| 7 | Biellese (G) | 22 | 8 | 5 | 9 | 31 | 28 | 1.107 | 21 | |
| 7 | Vogherese (G) | 22 | 7 | 7 | 8 | 31 | 33 | 0.939 | 21 | |
| 9 | Sestrese (G) | 22 | 8 | 4 | 10 | 30 | 40 | 0.750 | 20 | |
| 10 | Savona | 22 | 6 | 5 | 11 | 28 | 39 | 0.718 | 17 | |
| 11 | Ausonia Spezia (G, R) | 22 | 3 | 6 | 13 | 14 | 38 | 0.368 | 12 | Relegation to Serie C |
| 12 | Cuneo (G, R) | 22 | 4 | 4 | 14 | 18 | 43 | 0.419 | 12 | Relegation to Serie C |

Source: Panini
(A) Advance to a further round; (G) Guests; (P) Promoted; (R) Relegated

=== Results ===
| Home \ Away | ALE | AUS | BIE | CSL | CUN | NOV | PIA | PVE | SVN | SES | VIG | VOG |
|---|---|---|---|---|---|---|---|---|---|---|---|---|
| Alessandria | | 8–0 | 2–1 | 1–2 | 2–1 | 2–0 | 2–3 | 4–1 | 1–0 | 2–1 | 1–0 | 5–0 |
| Ausonia Spezia | 0–0 | | 0–1 | 0–1 | 0–0 | 0–1 | 2–2 | 1–0 | 0–0 | 1–0 | 1–3 | 1–1 |
| Biellese | 0–0 | 1–2 | | 1–1 | 4–0 | 1–0 | 4–0 | 0–4 | 4–2 | 1–1 | 0–0 | 3–0 |
| Casale | 3–1 | 1–0 | 2–1 | | 3–0 | 1–0 | 0–1 | 1–1 | 4–1 | 8–1 | 0–1 | 2–1 |
| Cuneo | 0–1 | 3–2 | 0–0 | 2–0 | | 1–1 | 4–0 | 0–2 | 3–4 | 1–0 | 0–1 | 1–2 |
| Novara | 0–0 | 4–0 | 1–0 | 2–1 | 0–0 | | 3–1 | 1–0 | 3–0 | 4–1 | 0–0 | 0–0 |
| Piacenza | 2–5 | 1–0 | 1–2 | 4–2 | 7–0 | 2–1 | | 1–0 | 1–0 | 6–1 | 1–0 | 7–2 |
| Pro Vercelli | 0–1 | 1–0 | 1–0 | 1–1 | 4–1 | 2–0 | 2–1 | | 4–1 | 3–2 | 2–1 | 1–1 |
| Savona | 2–0 | 2–2 | 1–4 | 3–0 | 1–0 | 1–1 | 1–2 | 4–0 | | 0–3 | 1–1 | 1–1 |
| Sestrese | 1–0 | 2–1 | 3–2 | 2–2 | 2–1 | 1–0 | 1–1 | 0–1 | 1–2 | | 1–0 | 4–0 |
| Vigevano | 2–2 | 2–1 | 3–1 | 1–0 | 3–0 | 1–0 | 1–0 | 1–1 | 2–1 | 2–0 | | 1–0 |
| Vogherese | 1–2 | 4–0 | 4–0 | 2–1 | 4–0 | 0–1 | 3–0 | 1–1 | 2–0 | 2–2 | 0–0 | |

Updated to match(es) played on unknown. Source: Almanacco Illustrato del Calcio - La Storia 1898-2004, Panini Edizioni, Modena, September 2005 (in Italian)
Legend: Blue = home team win; Yellow = draw; Red = away team win.

== Group B ==
=== Final classification ===
| Pos | Team | Pld | W | D | L | GF | GA | GR | Pts | Qualification or relegation |
|---|---|---|---|---|---|---|---|---|---|---|
| 1 | Cremonese (A) | 22 | 12 | 9 | 1 | 39 | 11 | 3.545 | 33 | Qualification to Final round |
| 2 | Pro Patria (A) | 22 | 10 | 8 | 4 | 34 | 21 | 1.619 | 28 | Qualification to Final round |
| 3 | Lecco (G) | 22 | 9 | 9 | 4 | 28 | 18 | 1.556 | 27 | |
| 4 | Legnano (G) | 22 | 9 | 8 | 5 | 36 | 28 | 1.286 | 26 | |
| 5 | Como (G) | 22 | 9 | 6 | 7 | 31 | 22 | 1.409 | 24 | |
| 6 | Crema (G) | 22 | 8 | 7 | 7 | 32 | 25 | 1.280 | 23 | |
| 7 | Fanfulla | 22 | 8 | 5 | 9 | 28 | 37 | 0.757 | 21 | |
| 8 | Pro Sesto (G) | 22 | 6 | 7 | 9 | 20 | 21 | 0.952 | 19 | |
| 9 | Seregno (G) | 22 | 8 | 2 | 12 | 23 | 33 | 0.697 | 18 | |
| 10 | Gallaratese (G) | 22 | 4 | 8 | 10 | 18 | 29 | 0.621 | 16 | |
| 10 | Mantova (G) | 22 | 6 | 4 | 12 | 22 | 42 | 0.524 | 16 | |
| 12 | Trento (G, R) | 22 | 4 | 5 | 13 | 17 | 41 | 0.415 | 13 | Relegation to Serie C |

Source: Panini
(A) Advance to a further round; (G) Guests; (R) Relegated

=== Results ===
| Home \ Away | COM | CRM | CRE | FAN | GLR | LCO | LEG | MAN | PPA | PSE | SER | TRN |
|---|---|---|---|---|---|---|---|---|---|---|---|---|
| Como | | 0–1 | 1–1 | 3–1 | 2–0 | 1–1 | 2–0 | 5–2 | 2–1 | 2–0 | 0–1 | 4–0 |
| Crema | 0–2 | | 1–3 | 1–1 | 1–0 | 1–1 | 7–1 | 4–1 | 2–2 | 1–0 | 2–3 | 2–1 |
| Cremonese | 2–0 | 1–0 | | 1–1 | 4–0 | 1–1 | 1–1 | 5–0 | 2–0 | 1–1 | 2–1 | 5–0 |
| Fanfulla | 0–0 | 1–1 | 0–2 | | 3–1 | 2–1 | 3–2 | 2–2 | 0–2 | 1–0 | 2–0 | 1–0 |
| Gallaratese | 1–1 | 1–1 | 1–1 | 2–1 | | 1–1 | 1–0 | 1–0 | 0–0 | 0–0 | 1–2 | 3–0 |
| Lecco | 3–1 | 0–0 | 1–0 | 3–0 | 1–0 | | 2–2 | 3–1 | 3–1 | 1–0 | 1–2 | 0–0 |
| Legnano | 2–1 | 2–0 | 0–0 | 5–1 | 3–0 | 2–0 | | 5–0 | 3–1 | 0–0 | 1–1 | 2–0 |
| Mantova | 1–0 | 1–0 | 1–2 | 0–2 | 1–1 | 0–2 | 3–0 | | 1–1 | 1–0 | 1–0 | 2–2 |
| Pro Patria | 1–1 | 1–1 | 1–1 | 3–0 | 3–2 | 0–0 | 3–0 | 1–0 | | 2–0 | 1–0 | 3–0 |
| Pro Sesto | 1–0 | 1–2 | 0–3 | 5–2 | 0–0 | 2–0 | 1–1 | 3–1 | 0–0 | | 3–0 | 1–1 |
| Seregno | 0–1 | 1–4 | 0–1 | 2–1 | 2–1 | 0–0 | 0–1 | 3–2 | 1–3 | 1–2 | | 3–2 |
| Trento | 1–2 | 1–0 | 0–0 | 1–3 | 2–1 | 1–3 | 1–1 | 0–1 | 2–4 | 1–0 | 1–0 | |

Updated to match(es) played on unknown. Source: Almanacco Illustrato del Calcio - La Storia 1898-2004, Panini Edizioni, Modena, September 2005 (in Italian)
Legend: Blue = home team win; Yellow = draw; Red = away team win.

== Group C ==
=== Final classification ===
| Pos | Team | Pld | W | D | L | GF | GA | GR | Pts | Qualification or relegation |
|---|---|---|---|---|---|---|---|---|---|---|
| 1 | Padova (A) | 22 | 11 | 7 | 4 | 35 | 18 | 1.944 | 29 | Qualification to Final round |
| 1 | Reggiana (G, A, P) | 22 | 11 | 7 | 4 | 32 | 19 | 1.684 | 29 | Qualification to Final round |
| 3 | Parma (G) | 22 | 12 | 4 | 6 | 36 | 20 | 1.800 | 28 | |
| 3 | Verona | 22 | 11 | 6 | 5 | 34 | 22 | 1.545 | 28 | |
| 5 | Suzzara (G) | 22 | 11 | 4 | 7 | 25 | 18 | 1.389 | 26 | |
| 6 | Treviso (G) | 22 | 9 | 5 | 8 | 30 | 28 | 1.071 | 23 | |
| 7 | Pro Gorizia | 22 | 7 | 8 | 7 | 26 | 24 | 1.083 | 22 | |
| 8 | Cesena (G) | 22 | 5 | 10 | 7 | 29 | 24 | 1.208 | 20 | |
| 8 | S.P.A.L. (G) | 22 | 6 | 8 | 8 | 29 | 28 | 1.036 | 20 | |
| 10 | Udinese | 22 | 6 | 6 | 10 | 21 | 32 | 0.656 | 18 | |
| 11 | Forlì (G) | 22 | 4 | 5 | 13 | 21 | 48 | 0.438 | 13 | |
| 12 | Panigale (G, R) | 22 | 2 | 4 | 16 | 19 | 56 | 0.339 | 8 | Relegation to Serie C |

Source: Panini
(A) Advance to a further round; (G) Guests; (P) Promoted; (R) Relegated

=== Results ===
| Home \ Away | CES | FOR | PAD | PAN | PAR | PGO | REA | SPA | SUZ | TRV | UDI | HEL |
|---|---|---|---|---|---|---|---|---|---|---|---|---|
| Cesena | | 4–0 | 0–0 | 3–1 | 0–1 | 0–0 | 5–0 | 3–1 | 2–0 | 3–3 | 1–1 | 1–1 |
| Forlì | 2–1 | | 2–1 | 2–2 | 0–2 | 1–1 | 1–1 | 2–2 | 2–1 | 2–1 | 0–2 | 0–1 |
| Padova | 0–0 | 4–1 | | 2–0 | 2–2 | 5–2 | 0–0 | 2–1 | 2–1 | 4–0 | 3–3 | 2–1 |
| Panigale | 2–2 | 4–2 | 1–1 | | 1–7 | 0–2 | 0–5 | 0–3 | 1–2 | 1–2 | 3–1 | 0–4 |
| Parma | 1–0 | 4–0 | 0–3 | 1–0 | | 1–0 | 0–2 | 4–1 | 0–0 | 4–0 | 3–1 | 4–1 |
| Pro Gorizia | 3–1 | 2–0 | 0–0 | 3–0 | 1–0 | | 2–4 | 2–0 | 0–1 | 2–1 | 1–1 | 1–1 |
| Reggiana | 2–0 | 1–0 | 0–0 | 2–0 | 0–1 | 1–1 | | 2–1 | 2–1 | 2–1 | 3–0 | 1–1 |
| SPAL | 0–0 | 5–1 | 3–1 | 0–0 | 1–1 | 2–2 | 0–0 | | 1–0 | 1–1 | 2–0 | 0–0 |
| Suzzara | 1–1 | 3–1 | 1–0 | 3–0 | 0–1 | 1–0 | 0–0 | 2–1 | | 3–1 | 2–1 | 1–0 |
| Treviso | 2–1 | 2–0 | 1–0 | 2–0 | 3–0 | 1–1 | 2–0 | 2–0 | 0–0 | | 0–0 | 3–0 |
| Udinese | 2–0 | 0–0 | 0–1 | 4–2 | 0–1 | 1–0 | 1–3 | 0–3 | 1–0 | 2–1 | | 0–0 |
| Hellas Verona | 1–1 | 4–2 | 1–0 | 3–1 | 2–0 | 2–0 | 2–1 | 3–1 | 1–2 | 2–1 | 3–0 | |

Updated to match(es) played on unknown. Source: Almanacco Illustrato del Calcio - La Storia 1898-2004, Panini Edizioni, Modena, September 2005 (in Italian)
Legend: Blue = home team win; Yellow = draw; Red = away team win.

== Final round ==
=== Final classification ===
| Pos | Team | Pld | W | D | L | GF | GA | GR | Pts | Promotion |
|---|---|---|---|---|---|---|---|---|---|---|
| 1 | Alessandria (P, C) | 10 | 7 | 1 | 2 | 21 | 6 | 3.500 | 15 | Promotion to Serie A |
| 2 | Pro Patria | 10 | 4 | 3 | 3 | 10 | 6 | 1.667 | 11 | |
| 3 | Vigevano | 10 | 4 | 2 | 4 | 11 | 11 | 1.000 | 10 | |
| 4 | Reggiana | 10 | 4 | 1 | 5 | 8 | 13 | 0.615 | 9 | |
| 5 | Cremonese | 10 | 3 | 2 | 5 | 7 | 12 | 0.583 | 8 | |
| 6 | Padova | 10 | 3 | 1 | 6 | 10 | 19 | 0.526 | 7 | |

Source: Panini
(C) Champions; (P) Promoted

=== Results ===
| Home \ Away | ALE | CRE | PAD | PPA | REA | VIG |
|---|---|---|---|---|---|---|
| Alessandria | | 1–0 | 6–2 | 1–0 | 5–0 | 2–0 |
| Cremonese | 0–0 | | 2–1 | 1–0 | 2–1 | 2–3 |
| Padova | 0–2 | 1–0 | | 1–4 | 2–0 | 1–1 |
| Pro Patria | 1–1 | 0–0 | 3–1 | | 1–0 | 0–0 |
| Reggiana | 1–0 | 3–0 | 1–0 | 0–0 | | 2–1 |
| Vigevano | 1–3 | 2–0 | 0–1 | 1–0 | 2–0 | |

Updated to match(es) played on unknown. Source: Almanacco Illustrato del Calcio - La Storia 1898-2004, Panini Edizioni, Modena, September 2005 (in Italian)
Legend: Blue = home team win; Yellow = draw; Red = away team win.

== Footnotes ==
On 16 May 1946 the Lega Calcio was created. Under agreements between FIGC, Northern and Southern clubs, all clubs from this championship out of the last ones were admitted to the Northern Serie B.

== References and sources ==
- Almanacco Illustrato del Calcio - La Storia 1898-2004, Panini Edizioni, Modena, September 2005
