= Delfino Pescara 1936 =

Association football club in Italy

Pescara
- Full name: Delfino Pescara 1936 S.p.A.
- Nicknames: I Delfini (The Dolphins); I Biancazzurri (The White and Blues); Gli Adriatici (The Adriatics)
- Founded: 1936; 90 years ago 2009; 17 years ago (refounded)
- Stadium: Stadio Adriatico – Giovanni Cornacchia
- Capacity: 20,476
- Owner: Delfino Capital Srl
- President: Daniele Sebastiani
- Head coach: Antonio Buscè
- League: Serie C Group B
- 2025–26: Serie B, 20th of 20 (relegated)
- Website: pescaracalcio.com
Home colours	Away colours	Third colours

Delfino Pescara 1936, commonly referred to as Pescara, is a professional Italian football club based in Pescara, Abruzzo.

The club was formed in 1936 and currently plays in Serie B, following their victory in the 2024–25 Serie C promotion play-offs. Pescara has competed in seven seasons in Serie A, 1977–78, 1979–80, 1987–88, 1988–89, 1992–93, 2012–13 and last participated in 2016–17. The team's official colours are white and light blue varied between either azure or sky blue, manifested in striped shirts with white socks and shorts.

== History ==
Aside from a spell in Serie B in the 1940s, Pescara had a relatively undistinguished history until promotion to Serie B in 1974. With players like Giorgio Repetto and Bruno Nobili in the midfield, they managed to win their first promotion to Serie A in 1977 after winning the promotion play-off, but ultimately finished their first season in Serie A in last place. A second promotion after a play-off followed, but once more they would be relegated from the top flight and then descended to Serie C1 within two years.

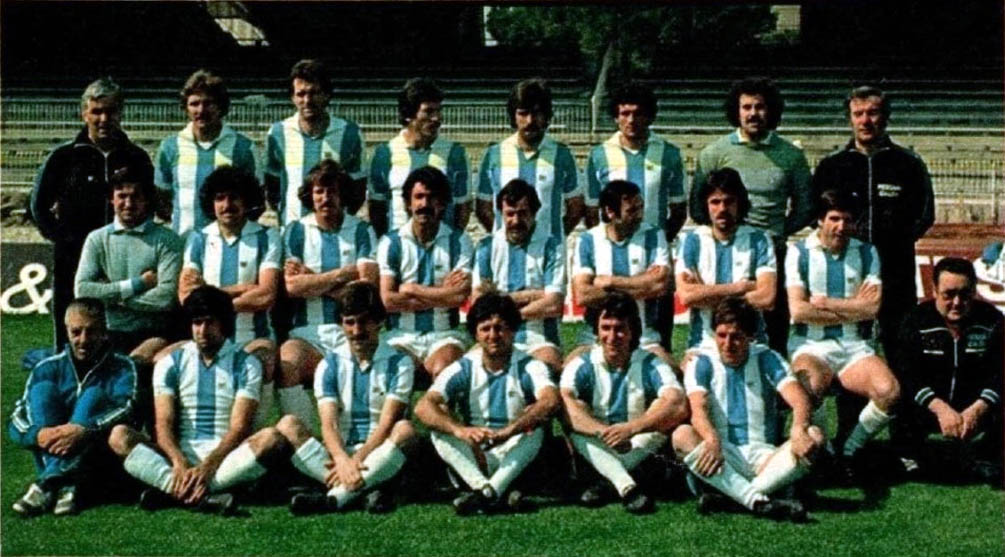
A team of Pescara Calcio in 1979

Nonetheless, after returning to Serie B after a year, Pescara would enjoy a revival after the appointment of Giovanni Galeone as coach in 1986. His philosophy of attacking football saw the Biancazzurri promoted to Serie A as champions in 1987, where they lasted two years with players such as Júnior and Blaž Slišković among the club's star players. Galeone would return during the 1990–91 season and oversaw another promotion the following year.

After relegation, Pescara remained in Serie B side throughout the 1990s, narrowly missing promotion in 1999. Relegation to C1 followed in 2001, with promotion in 2003 being followed by two revoked relegations in a row due to bankruptcy and scandals affecting other clubs. Pescara was ultimately relegated in the 2006–07 season, with three presidential and managerial changes during the season. In December 2008, the debt-ridden club was legally declared out of business and its control passed to a bankruptcy trustee appointed by the Court of Pescara. In February 2009, a takeover from a group named Delfino Pescara 1936 was finalized with Deborah Caldora becoming the first woman to serve as chairman of the club. In the meantime, results did not improve significantly and in March, Giuseppe Galderisi was dismissed from the head coaching post with Antonello Cuccureddu being appointed as the new boss.

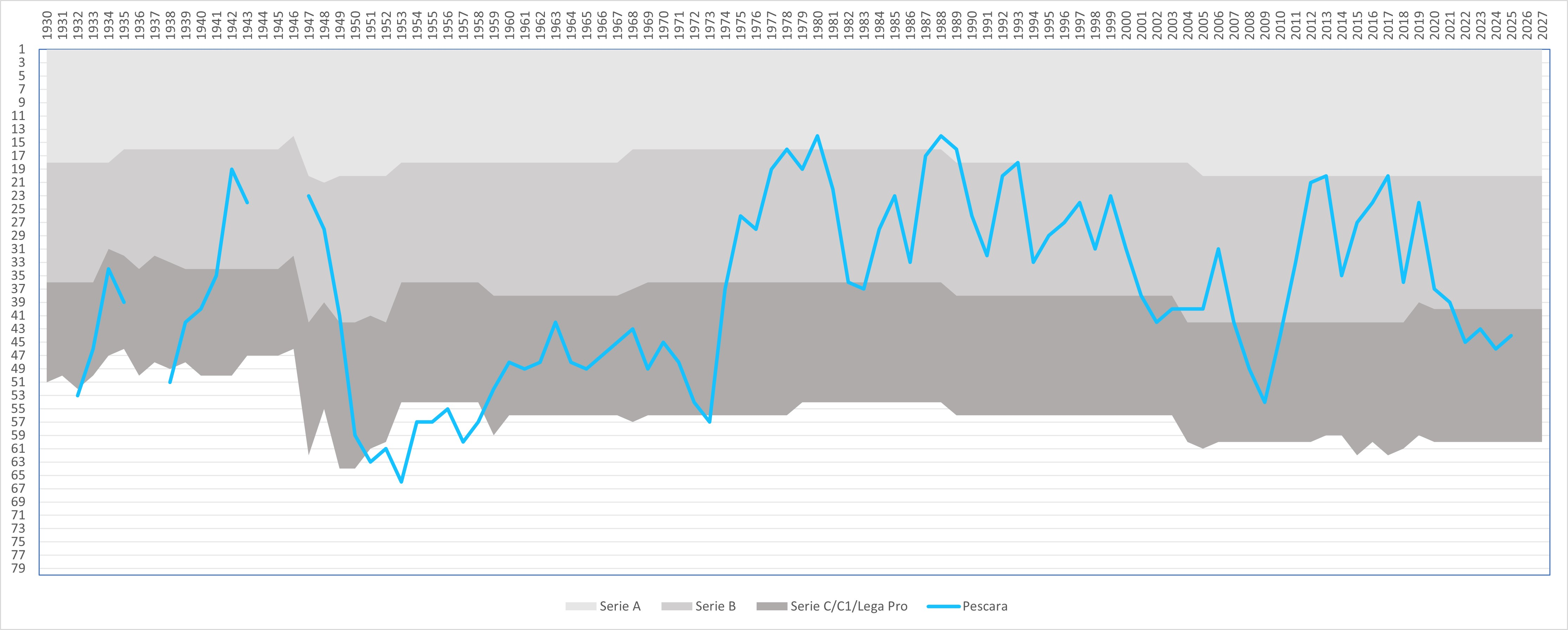
The performance of Pescara in the Italian football league structure since the first season of a unified Serie A (1929–30)

At the beginning of the 2009–10 season, Eusebio Di Francesco was appointed as the new coach. Pescara finished second in Girone B of Lega Pro Prima Divisione and qualified for the promotional play-offs. They defeated Reggiana in the semi-final and Verona in the final and subsequently returned to Serie B after a three-year absence. The following season started with the appointment of Zdeněk Zeman as new head coach; the Czech manager immediately brought Pescara back into national coverage thanks to his well-known all-attacking playing style that turned out to match perfectly with promising youngsters such as Marco Verratti with loanees Ciro Immobile and Lorenzo Insigne, who guided the squad to promotion to Serie A. Pescara secured promotion to the top-level after a 19-year absence after defeating Sampdoria with a 3–1 score in an away match on 20 May 2012. In the last minute of the final game of the regular season, Pescara striker Riccardo Maniero netted the winner in a match against Nocerina to claim Pescara's second Serie B title after Torino's draw away to AlbinoLeffe.

Pescara's 2012–13 campaign in Serie A – after losing Zeman, Verratti, Immobile and Insigne – ended with relegation back to the second tier. Three years later, under World Cup winner Massimo Oddo, the team returned to Serie A with a 3–1 aggregate win over Trapani in the playoff final. Zeman returned in February 2017 to the team, who again lasted just one year at the top before being relegated in last place.

In August 2018, Pescara launched a public mini-bond investment opportunity via sports investment platform Tifosy to raise a minimum of €2,000,000. The investment scheme raised a total of €2,300,000 to develop the club's youth sector and facilities.

Following an online competition to ease children's boredom during the coronavirus lockdown, the team adopted six-year-old Luigi D'Agostino's shirt design for the 2020 season.

After a poor 2020–21 campaign, the side were relegated to Serie C, the third tier of Italian football. However, during the 2024–25 Serie C, Pescara finished 4th in their group, thus qualifying for the second round promotion play-offs, where they would beat Pianese to move on to the next round. In the national phase, they would beat Catania in a 2–2 aggregate and went on to beat Vis Pesaro in the second round. In the final four, they would beat Audace Cerignola to qualify for the finals, and went on to face Ternana. Although winning the first leg, Ternana would tie the aggregate in the second leg, however, after beating the team 3–1 in penalties, thus securing them promotion to the 2025–26 Serie B after 4 years of relegation from the second tier. On their return to Serie B, they debuted on August 23 with a 3–1 loss against Cesena.

== Supporters ==
One of Pescara's main rivals is Bari.

== Players ==
=== Current squad ===
As of 1 September 2026

Note: Flags indicate national team as defined under FIFA eligibility rules; some limited exceptions apply. Players may hold more than one non-FIFA nationality.

No.	Pos.	Nation	Player
1	GK	ALB	Enis Ujkaj
2	DF	ITA	Riccardo Capellini
3	DF	ITA	Gaetano Letizia
5	MF	ALB	Erdis Kraja
6	MF	NGR	Victor Eletu
7	MF	ITA	Lorenzo Meazzi
8	MF	ITA	Leonardo Graziani
10	FW	ITA	Davide Merola
11	FW	ITA	Gianmarco Cangiano
12	GK	ITA	Nicolò Profeta
13	DF	ITA	Jacopo La Barba
14	MF	ITA	Luca Valzania
15	DF	ITA	Giorgio Altare
17	MF	CAN	Massimo Gatto
18	DF	ITA	Matteo Milan
19	MF	ITA	Michele D'Ausilio (on loan from Avellino)

No.	Pos.	Nation	Player
20	DF	ITA	Francesco Donati
21	FW	ITA	Andrea Ferraris
22	GK	ITA	Ivan Saio
23	DF	ITA	Filippo Pellacani
24	MF	ITA	Filippo Guccione
25	DF	ITA	Lapo Valori
27	MF	ITA	Bilal Erradi
28	MF	ITA	Christian D'Errico
30	MF	ITA	Giuseppe Saccomanni
32	DF	ITA	Matteo Motta
36	DF	ITA	Emanuele Troiano
37	FW	ITA	Pablo Vitali
39	FW	ITA	Luigi Morazzini
44	MF	ITA	Jacopo Sardo (on loan from AC Milan)
49	FW	CAN	Michael Zeppieri
97	FW	ITA	Giacomo Parigi

=== Out on loan ===
Note: Flags indicate national team as defined under FIFA eligibility rules; some limited exceptions apply. Players may hold more than one non-FIFA nationality.

No.	Pos.	Nation	Player
—	DF	ITA	Davide Giannini (at Potenza until 30 June 2027)

== Coaching staff ==
As of 2 July 2025

Position	Name
Sporting director	(Italy) Pasquale Foggia
Head coach	(Italy) Vacant
Assistant coach	(Italy) Vacant
Technical assistant	(Italy) Diego Labricciosa
Match analyst and technical assistant	(Italy) Massimo Carcarino
Goalkeeping coach	(Italy) Fabrizio Zambardi
Social doctors	(Italy) Emanuela Spada (Italy) Angelo Circolone (Italy) Lorenzo Mazzocchetti
Health consultant	(Italy) Gabriele Tavolieri (Italy) Stefano Guarracini
Athletic trainer	(Italy) Antonio Del Fosco
Rehab coach	(Italy) Carlo Cavasinni
Physiotherapists	(Italy) Marco Rossi (Italy) Rocco Trivarelli (Italy) Andrea Giannini
Administrative manager	(Italy) Elena Di Stefano
Marketing manager	(Italy) Pietro Falconio
Marketing	(Italy) Andrea Scazzosi
Team manager	(Italy) Francesco Troiano
Support liaison officer	(Italy) Alessandro Cupaiolo
Responsible for combating abuse, violence, and discrimination	(Italy) Attorney Domenico Giorgetti
Head of communications	(Italy) Massimo Mucciante
Event management delegate	(Italy) Luigi Gramenzi
Deputy event management delegate	(Italy) Andrea Blasioli
Press office	(Italy) Andrea Mazzetti
Official store	(Italy) Catia Crocetta (Italy) Erika Mascitti
Kitman	(Italy) Luciano Palombi (Italy) Cristian Cremonese (Romania) Geanina Olariu
Youth sector president	(Italy) Marco Tortora
Youth sector director	(Italy) Antonio Bocchetti
Youth sector and football school coordinator	(Italy) Angelo Londrillo
President of Piccoli Delfini	(Italy) Filippo Falconio

== Managerial history ==
Name	Nationality	Years
Edmondo De Amicis	(Italy)	1937–38
Pietro Piselli	(Italy)	1938–39
Armando Bonino	(Italy)	1939–40
Mario Pizziolo	(Italy)	1940–41
Luigi Ferrero	(Italy)	1941–43
Edmondo De Amicis	(Italy)	1944–45
Giuseppe Marchi	(Italy)	1945–46
József Bánás	(Hungary)	1946–47
Mario Pizziolo	(Italy)	1947–48
Gino Piccinini	(Italy)	1948–49
Benedetto Stella	(Italy)	1949–50
Luigi Del Grosso	(Italy)	1950–53
Umberto De Angelis	(Italy)	1953–55
Alfredo Notti	(Italy)	1955–56
Alfredo Monza; Renato Piacentini; Orazio Sola	(Italy) (Italy) (Italy)	1956–57
Renato Piacentini	(Italy)	1957–58
Aurelio Marchese; Mario Tontodonati	(Italy) (Italy)	1958–59
Ljubo Benčić; Mario Tontodonati	(Socialist Federal Republic of Yugoslavia) (Italy)	1959–61
Umberto De Angelis	(Italy)	1961–62
Leonardo Costagliola	(Italy)	1962–63
Ljubo Benčić; Renato Piacentini	(Socialist Federal Republic of Yugoslavia) (Italy)	1963–64
Ljubo Benčić; Vincenzo Marsico	(Socialist Federal Republic of Yugoslavia) (Italy)	1964–65
Antonio Giammarinaro; Alfredo Notti	(Italy) (Italy)	1965–66
Sergio Cervato	(Italy)	1966–67
Antonio Giammarinaro	(Italy)	1967–68
Gianni Seghedoni; Mario Tontodonati	(Italy) (Italy)	1968–69
Dante Lacorata; Mario Tontodonati	(Italy) (Italy)	1969–70
Francesco Capocasale	(Italy)	1970–71
Enzo Falini; Vitaliano Patricelli	(Italy) (Italy)	1971–72
Domenico Rosati	(Italy)	1972–76
Giancarlo Cadé	(Italy)	1976–78
Antonio Valentín Angelillo	(Italy)	1978–79
Gustavo Giagnoni; Claudio Tobia; Mario Tontodonati	(Italy) (Italy) (Italy)	1979–80
Aldo Agroppi	(Italy)	1980–81
Giuseppe Chiappella; Saul Malatrasi; Mario Tiddia	(Italy) (Italy) (Italy)	1981–82
Domenico Rosati	(Italy)	1982–84
Enrico Catuzzi	(Italy)	1984–86
Giovanni Galeone	(Italy)	1986–89
Ilario Castagner; Edoardo Reja	(Italy) (Italy)	1989–90
Giovanni Galeone; Carlo Mazzone	(Italy) (Italy)	1990–91
Giovanni Galeone	(Italy)	1991–92
Vincenzo Zucchini	(Italy)	1992–93
Gianni Corelli; Giorgio Rumignani; Franco Scoglio; Vincenzo Zucchini	(Italy) (Italy) (Italy) (Italy)	1993–94
Francesco Oddo; Giorgio Rumignani	(Italy) (Italy)	1994–95
Luigi Maifredi; Francesco Oddo	(Italy) (Italy)	1995–96
Delio Rossi	(Italy)	July 1996 – June 1997
Adriano Buffoni; Maurizio Viscidi	(Italy) (Italy)	1997–98
Luigi De Canio; Francesco Giorgini	(Italy) (Italy)	July 1998 – June 1999
Giovanni Galeone	(Italy)	July 1999 – Nov 2000
Tarcisio Burgnich; Giovanni Galeone; Delio Rossi	(Italy) (Italy) (Italy)	2000–01
Ivo Iaconi	(Italy)	July 2001 – May 2004
Cetteo Di Mascio	(Italy)	May 2004 - June 2004
Giovanni Simonelli	(Italy)	June 2004 – June 2005
Maurizio Sarri	(Italy)	July 2005 – July 2006
Davide Ballardini; Aldo Ammazzalorso; Luigi De Rosa; Vincenzo Vivarini	(Italy) (Italy) (Italy) (Italy)	July 2006 – June 2007
Franco Lerda	(Italy)	July 2007 – June 2008
Giuseppe Galderisi	(Italy)	July 2008 – March 2009
Antonello Cuccureddu	(Italy)	2009–10
Eusebio Di Francesco	(Italy)	Jan 2010 – June 2011
Zdeněk Zeman	(Czech Republic)	June 2011 – June 2012
Giovanni Stroppa	(Italy)	June 2012 – November 2012
Cristiano Bergodi	(Italy)	November 2012 – March 2013
Cristian Bucchi	(Italy)	March 2013 – June 2013
Pasquale Marino	(Italy)	June 2013 – February 2014
Serse Cosmi	(Italy)	February 2014 – July 2014
Marco Baroni	(Italy)	August 2014 – May 2015
Massimo Oddo	(Italy)	May 2015 – February 2017
Luciano Zauri (caretaker)	(Italy)	February 2017
Zdeněk Zeman	(Czech Republic)	February 2017 – March 2018
Massimo Epifani	(Italy)	March 2018 – April 2018
Giuseppe Pillon	(Italy)	April 2018 – May 2019
Luciano Zauri	(Italy)	June 2019 – January 2020
Nicola Legrottaglie	(Italy)	January 2020 – July 2020
Andrea Sottil	(Italy)	July 2020 – August 2020
Massimo Oddo	(Italy)	August 2020 – November 2020
Roberto Breda	(Italy)	November 2020 – January 2021
Gianluca Grassadonia	(Italy)	January 2021 – June 2021
Gaetano Auteri	(Italy)	June 2021 – April 2022
Luciano Zauri	(Italy)	April 2022 – June 2022
Alberto Colombo	(Italy)	June 2022 – June 2022
Zdeněk Zeman	(Czech Republic)	June 2022 – February 2024
Giovanni Bucaro	(Italy)	February 2024 – March 2024
Emmanuel Cascione	(Italy)	March 2024 – July 2024
Silvio Baldini	(Italy)	July 2024 – June 2025

== Honours ==
- Serie B
  - Champions (2): 1986–87, 2011–12
- Serie C
  - Champions (1): 1973–74,
- Serie D
  - Champions (1): 1972–73,

== Divisional movements ==
Series	Years	Last	Promotions	Relegations
A	7	2016–17	-	▼6 (1978, 1980, 1989, 1993, 2013, 2017)
B	39	2020–21	▲6 (1977, 1979, 1987, 1992, 2012, 2016)	▼5 (1949, 1982, 2001, 2007, 2021)
C	29	2024–25	▲6 (1941, 1974, 1983, 2003, 2010, 2025)	▼3 (1935✟, 1950, 1972)
75 out of 90 years of professional football in Italy since 1929
D	10	1972–73	▲1 (1938, 1958, 1973)	never
E	1	1936–37	▲1 (1937)	never

• Forerunner red-blue AC Pescara (1932–1935) included
