= US Ausonia Spezia =

Italian football club

Ausonia Spezia
- Full name: Unione Sportiva Ausonia Spezia
- Founded: 1919
- Dissolved: 1950
- Ground: unknown, La Spezia, Italy
Home colours	Away colours

Unione Sportiva Ausonia Spezia was an Italian association football club located in La Spezia.

The club was admitted to the 1945–46 Serie B-C after merging with the Afterwork Spezia, the second club in the city. However, the following season Ausonia was relegated to Serie C 1946–47. The club was immediately relegated to Promozione and later dissolved.

== See also ==
- Spezia Calcio
- 1945–46 Serie B-C Alta Italia
- Serie C 1946–47
