= Francesco Oddo =

Italian footballer and manager

Francesco Oddo (born 24 August 1946) is an Italian football manager and former player.

== Career ==
Born in Trapani, Sicily, but resident of Città Sant'Angelo, Abruzzo, Oddo started his coaching career in 1988 with Giulianova of the Serie C2 league.

In 1990, he became head coach of Serie B club Avellino, successively managing several other teams from the same league such as Modena and Pescara.

Oddo made his debut in a Serie A coaching position during the 1995–96 season, with Reggiana, ending the season with an unfortunate relegation. He then had two other Serie A stints as head coach at Salernitana, where he took over the last eight matches of the season from Delio Rossi in 1999, and Venezia. As of May 1999, Salernitana had a streak of five clean sheets in a row under Oddo. As of April 2000, Venezia had a streak of four unbeaten matches, also under Oddo.

He later also coached Messina during the 2002–03 Serie B season.

== Personal life ==
Francesco is the father of the former S.S. Lazio, A.C. Milan, Bayern Munich, and Italy right-back Massimo Oddo, who had a successful career both at club and international level, winning the 2006 FIFA World Cup and the 2006–07 UEFA Champions League, among other titles.
