= 1972–73 Serie B =

Italian football league season

Serie B
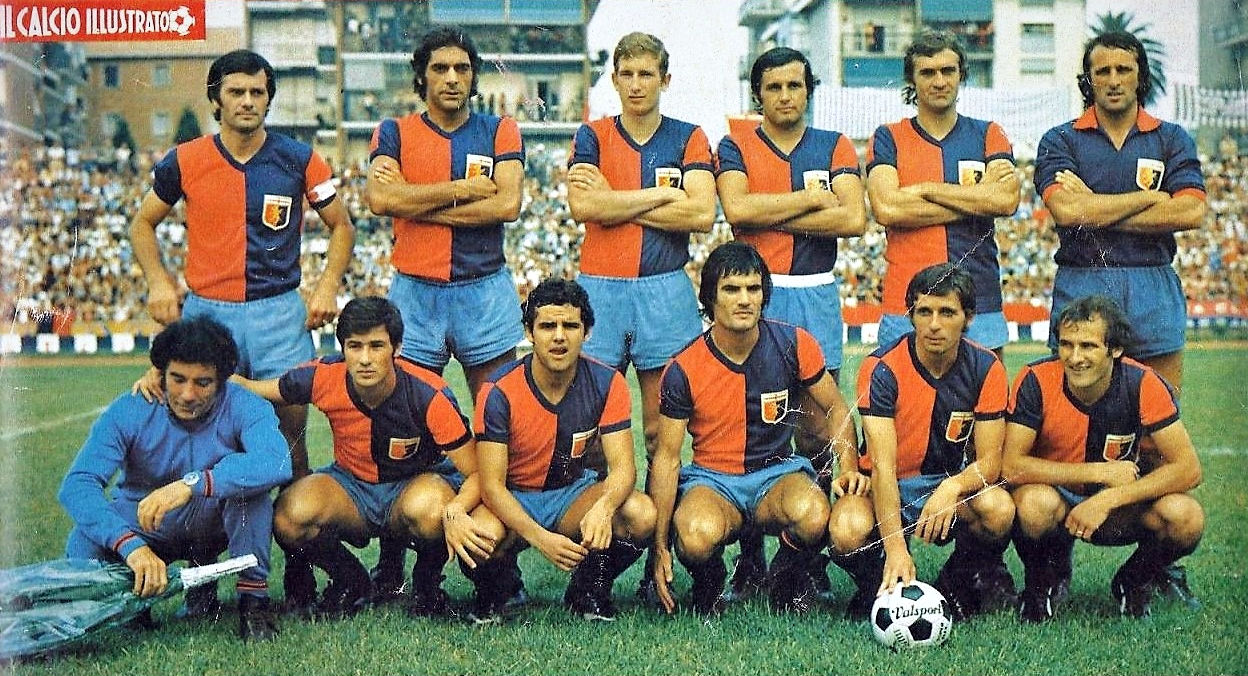
- 1972–73 Genoa squad
- Season: 1972–73
- Champions: Genoa; 4th title

Serie B 1972-73 team distribution

The Serie B 1972–73 was the forty-first tournament of this competition played in Italy since its creation.

== Teams ==
Lecco, Ascoli and Brindisi had been promoted from Serie C, while Catanzaro, Mantova and Varese had been relegated from Serie A.

== Final classification ==
Pos	Team	Pld	W	D	L	GF	GA	GD	Pts	Promotion or relegation
1	Genoa (P, C)	38	20	13	5	47	26	+21	53	Promotion to Serie A
2	Cesena (P)	38	17	15	6	36	21	+15	49	Promotion to Serie A
3	Foggia (P)	38	19	11	8	37	25	+12	49	Promotion to Serie A
4	Ascoli	38	20	8	10	45	31	+14	48	
5	Catania	38	14	15	9	29	20	+9	43	
6	Varese	38	13	16	9	30	26	+4	42	
7	Brindisi	38	12	17	9	32	24	+8	41	
8	Catanzaro	38	12	15	11	38	27	+11	39	
9	Novara	38	13	12	13	37	37	0	38	
10	Reggiana	38	11	15	12	31	31	0	37	
11	Como	38	11	14	13	31	33	−2	36	
12	Bari	38	10	16	12	29	33	−4	36	
13	Arezzo	38	9	16	13	24	29	−5	34	
14	Perugia	38	11	11	16	29	34	−5	33	
15	Taranto	38	8	17	13	29	39	−10	33	
16	Reggina	38	6	19	13	18	26	−8	31	
17	Brescia	38	7	17	14	26	37	−11	31	
18	Mantova (R)	38	8	15	15	19	32	−13	31	Relegation to Serie C (Note: Mantova and Monza relegated for goal difference.)
19	Monza (R)	38	8	15	15	24	39	−15	31	Relegation to Serie C
20	Lecco (R)	38	5	15	18	19	40	−21	25	Relegation to Serie C

Source: Panini
(C) Champions; (P) Promoted; (R) Relegated

== Results ==
Home \ Away	ARE	ASC	BAR	BRE	BRI	CTN	CTZ	CES	COM	FOG	GEN	LCO	MAN	MON	NOV	PER	REA	REG	TAR	VAR
Arezzo		0–0	1–1	0–0	1–0	1–0	1–1	2–0	0–0	1–1	0–1	1–1	2–1	2–0	1–1	2–0	1–0	1–0	0–0	0–0
Ascoli	3–1		4–0	2–0	2–1	2–0	0–0	1–0	2–0	0–2	1–0	3–0	1–0	4–1	0–0	2–1	1–0	2–0	1–0	0–1
Bari	1–0	1–1		2–1	1–0	0–0	3–1	1–1	1–1	0–1	1–1	0–0	0–0	3–1	1–0	0–1	1–1	2–1	3–2	0–0
Brescia	1–1	1–1	1–0		1–1	1–0	0–3	0–1	2–0	1–1	1–1	1–1	1–2	0–0	2–0	1–0	0–0	0–0	2–0	2–0
Brindisi	1–0	0–1	1–1	1–0		1–0	0–0	1–2	2–2	0–0	3–0	3–1	1–1	1–0	3–0	2–1	0–0	2–1	1–1	1–0
Catania	1–0	0–1	1–0	1–1	0–0		1–0	1–0	1–0	0–0	1–2	3–0	2–0	1–0	1–0	2–0	3–0	0–0	1–1	1–1
Catanzaro	0–0	3–1	0–0	2–0	1–0	0–1		3–0	0–0	2–0	1–0	1–1	3–0	1–0	1–1	0–1	1–0	1–1	2–2	3–0
Cesena	2–0	2–0	1–0	1–1	0–0	0–0	0–0		1–0	3–0	1–1	3–0	2–1	1–0	0–0	2–0	1–0	2–1	2–0	2–1
Como	1–1	0–2	1–0	1–1	1–0	2–2	1–0	0–1		2–1	2–0	1–1	1–0	2–0	0–1	2–1	3–1	0–0	2–2	1–1
Foggia	2–0	1–0	0–0	2–0	0–0	1–0	1–0	0–0	1–0		1–2	1–0	0–2	2–0	3–1	1–0	3–1	1–0	1–1	1–0
Genoa	1–0	6–1	1–0	3–0	0–1	1–1	1–1	2–1	0–0	3–1		1–0	3–0	1–0	1–0	2–1	2–1	2–1	1–0	3–2
Lecco	0–0	0–1	0–1	1–1	1–2	0–0	1–0	0–0	2–1	0–2	0–0		2–0	1–2	0–1	3–1	0–1	0–0	1–1	0–0
Mantova	1–0	0–0	0–3	1–1	1–0	1–2	2–0	1–1	0–1	0–1	0–0	1–1		0–0	1–0	1–0	0–0	0–1	1–0	0–0
Monza	1–1	1–1	1–1	0–0	0–0	2–0	0–0	0–0	1–0	0–1	1–1	0–0	1–0		3–3	1–0	0–3	0–0	1–0	1–1
Novara	2–0	1–3	1–0	1–0	0–0	0–0	1–0	2–0	2–1	1–1	1–2	0–1	0–0	5–3		4–2	1–0	1–0	3–0	2–2
Perugia	0–0	1–0	2–0	2–0	0–0	1–0	1–1	0–0	0–0	1–0	0–0	2–0	0–0	2–0	2–0		1–1	0–0	0–0	1–2
Reggiana	2–1	3–0	3–1	1–1	0–0	0–0	2–1	1–2	1–2	1–1	1–1	1–0	0–0	0–0	1–0	1–3		0–0	1–0	2–0
Reggina	2–0	0–0	0–0	1–0	1–1	0–1	2–2	0–0	1–0	1–2	0–1	1–0	0–0	0–2	0–0	0–0	0–1		1–0	0–0
Taranto	1–0	2–1	2–0	2–1	1–1	0–0	0–3	1–1	0–0	0–0	0–0	1–0	1–1	0–1	2–1	2–1	0–0	2–2		1–0
Varese	0–2	2–0	0–0	1–0	2–1	1–1	2–0	0–0	1–0	2–0	0–0	2–0	1–0	1–0	0–0	2–0	0–0	0–0	2–1	

Source: Almanacco Illustrato del Calcio - La Storia 1898-2004, Panini Edizioni, Modena, September 2005 (in Italian)
Legend: Blue = home team win; Yellow = draw; Red = away team win.

== Attendances ==
#	Club	Average
1	Genoa	30,166
2	Bari	14,522
3	Cesena	11,892
4	Taranto	10,589
5	Foggia	9,690
6	Catanzaro	9,492
7	Reggiana	9,283
8	Catania	8,094
9	Mantova	7,754
10	Brescia	7,410
11	Ascoli	6,134
12	Reggina	6,087
13	Brindisi	6,080
14	Lecco	5,725
15	Perugia	5,585
16	Como	5,115
17	Varese	4,438
18	Novara	4,222
19	Monza	4,213
20	Arezzo	4,191

== References and sources ==
- Almanacco Illustrato del Calcio - La Storia 1898-2004, Panini Edizioni, Modena, September 2005

Specific
