= SS Leonzio 1909 =

Italian football club

Leonzio 1909
- Full name: Associazione Sportiva Dilettantistica Società Sportiva Leonzio 1909
- Founded: 1909; founded as Sport Club Leonzio; 1988; refounded as Società Sportiva Atletico Leonzio; 1994; refounded as Società Sportiva Leonzio 1909; 2003; refounded as Associazione Calcio Sporting Leonzio 1909; 2012; refounded as Associazione Sportiva Dilettantistica Atletico Leonzio; 2013; refounded as Associazione Sportiva Dilettantistica Sicula Leonzio (from 2017 called Sicula Leonzio); 2020 (dissolved); 2021; refounded as Associazione Sportiva Dilettantistica F.C. Leonzio 1909; 2022; refounded as Associazione Sportiva Dilettantistica S.S. Leonzio 1909
- Ground: Sicula Trasporti Stadium–Stadio Angelino Nobile, Lentini, Italy
- Capacity: 3,500
- Chairman: Gaetano Nardo
- Manager: Giuseppe Calvaruso
- League: Eccellenza Sicily Group B
- Website: https://www.leonzio1909.it

ASD SS Leonzio 1909, also commonly known as Leonzio, is an Italian football club located in Lentini.

They participate in the 2026–27 Eccellenza, the fifth level of the Italian football league system.

== History ==
=== Origins (1909–1980s) ===
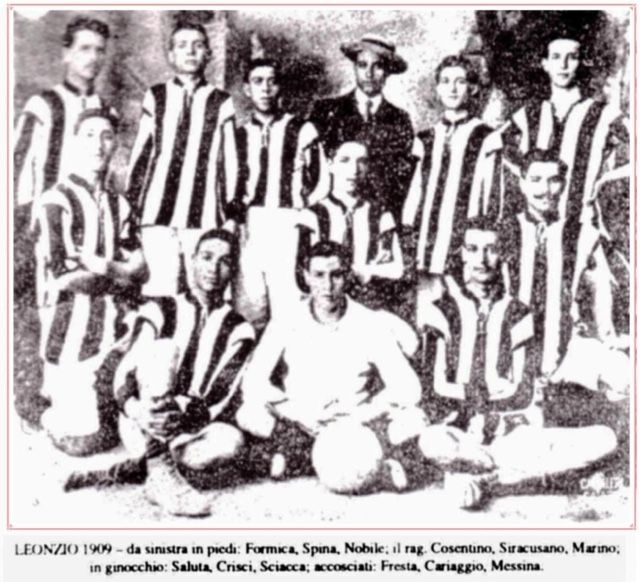
Sport Club Leonzio in 1909.

The club was founded in 1909 as Sport Club Leonzio by some students attending the Technical and Commercial Institute of Augusta. Among them, Giuseppe Messina, Angelino Nobile and Francesco Siracusano were from Lentini. They chose black and white as the club's colours. In 1914, the marchioness Riso organised a four-team competition that saw the participation of US Catanese, Megara Augusta, Leonzio, and Carlentini. The award consisted of a diploma and a gold medal. Leonzio reached the final, in which they had to face Carlentini in an away match in the nearby town in what was the first derby of Leonzio's history. However, the first match was suspended because a brawl erupted. The organisers decided to replay the game in the neutral venue of Agnone Bagni. Leonzio eventually won the competition, attracting the first interest of Lentinesi in football.

After decades of participating in regional and juvenile tournaments, Leonzio was admitted to the 1945–46 Serie C. At the end of the season, economic troubles, which have characterised the club throughout its history, prevented Leonzio from renewing its league registration. After 10 additional years spent in minor regional championships, the club was admitted through a repechage to 1956–57 Promozione Sicilia, the higher tier of regional tournaments in Sicily. The club remained in this league for three seasons, but was relegated to Prima Categoria in the 1959–60 season. Leonzio had to wait until the 1968–69 season to be promoted back to the fourth tier of the Italian football league system, conquering the 1969–70 Serie D under the management of Adelmo Prenna, who was also a player for the team.

Starting from the 1969–70 season, Leonzio competed for ten consecutive seasons in Serie D, achieving second place as the best result in the 1972–73 Serie D.

=== Atletico Leonzio era (1988–1994) ===
One of the most prominent eras of the Lentinese club started in 1988, when Società Sportiva Atletico Leonzio was formed after the fusion between Società Sportiva Leonzio (which would have been relegated to the Seconda Categoria Sicilia for the 1988–89 season) and Società Sportiva Atletico Catania. This new society joined the 1988–89 Serie C2. In the fifth consecutive season in Serie C2, Atletico Leonzio achieved second place in Girone C, being promoted to 1993–94 Serie C1. However, the chairman Franco Proto decided to move the club to Catania at the end of the season. The fusion with Atletico Catania was, therefore, disrupted. The old club was reformed by the name of Società Sportiva Leonzio 1909, which enrolled the 1994–95 Campionato Nazionale Dilettanti.

=== Refoundations and return to regional leagues (1995–2013) ===
At the end of the season, S.S. Leonzio 1909 were relegated to the 1995–96 Eccellenza Sicily, in which they remained for six seasons before being relegated again to Promozione at the end of the 2000–01 season. In the summer of 2002, the title of the freshly promoted to Serie D Misterbanco was moved to Lentini under the nomination of Associazione Calcio Lentini, This new team participated in the 2002–03 Serie D, but at the end of the season it was relegated to Eccellenza after losing relegation playoffs to Nuova Vibonese. In the meanwhile, S.S. Leonzio 1909 had participated in 2002–03 Promozione, being relegated to 2003–04 Prima Categoria at the end of the season.

A new denomination, Associazione Calcio Sporting Leonzio 1909, was given to A.C. Lentini in the 2003 summer. A.C.S. Leonzio 1909 enrolled in the 2003–04 Serie D. Even though the relegation was barely avoided by winning the relegation playoffs, the endless financial problems of the club forced them to join the 2004–05 Eccellenza instead with the name Associazione Calcio Leonzio 1909. By the 2009–10 season, Leonzio, which in the meanwhile had taken the name Associazione Sportiva Dilettantistica Leonzio, sank to Prima Categoria. That season, they reached the promotion playoffs but lost to Real San Cristoforo after a tough 0–5 home defeat. However, Leonzio was admitted to the 2010–11 Promozione through a repechage.

On April 2, 2011, Leonzio was promoted to Eccellenza by winning 1–0 against Comiso. Leonzio ended the 2011–12 Eccellenza at the fifteenth place with only 6 points. In August 2012, Leonzio still had no chairman and did not enrol in any league. As a consequence, Associazione Sportiva Dilettantistica Atletico Leonzio restarted from Terza Categoria, the bottom of the Italian league system.

=== Sicula Leonzio era and return to Serie C (2013–2017) ===
On July 1, 2013, a new club, named Associazione Sportiva Dilettantistica Sicula Leonzio and formed from the title of Real Belpassese, was admitted to Promozione. Sicula Leonzio achieved third place at the end of the season, but they lost the promotion playoffs against Comprensorio Normanno, missing the promotion to Eccellenza. However, Sicula Leonzio achieved two promotions in a row in the following two seasons. During the 2014–15 season, the club finished first and was promoted directly. During the 2015–16 season, Sicula Leonzio achieved third place and then beat 3–1 (a.e.t.) Troina in the semifinal and 1–0 Acireale in the final of the promotion playoffs. As a result, the team qualified for the national playoffs for the promotion to Serie D, when they beat San Giorgio 1926 in the semi-final and Real Metapontino in the final.

Sicula Leonzio managed to keep a clean sheet for the first six league games of the 2016–17 Serie D (Girone I), receiving attention from the national Italian media as being the only team among the 264 professional football clubs in the first four tiers of Italian football league system having not conceded a goal up to that point. On November 22, 2016, Francesco Cozza was appointed as a new manager, replacing Seby Catania. Under the new management, Sicula Leonzio achieved a record 15 winning streak, and obtained the promotion – the third in a row – to the 2017–18 Serie C with three games to spare. This result meant a return to the third tier of Italian football after 23 years of absence for the club of Lentini. As a result, the club became a società a responsabilità limitata (S.r.l.), changing the name to Sicula Leonzio. After the Poule Scudetto, in which Leonzio lost to Monza in the semi-final, Cozza resigned his managerial position to become the manager of Taranto, being replaced by Pino Rigoli.

=== Serie C and dismissal (2017–2020) ===
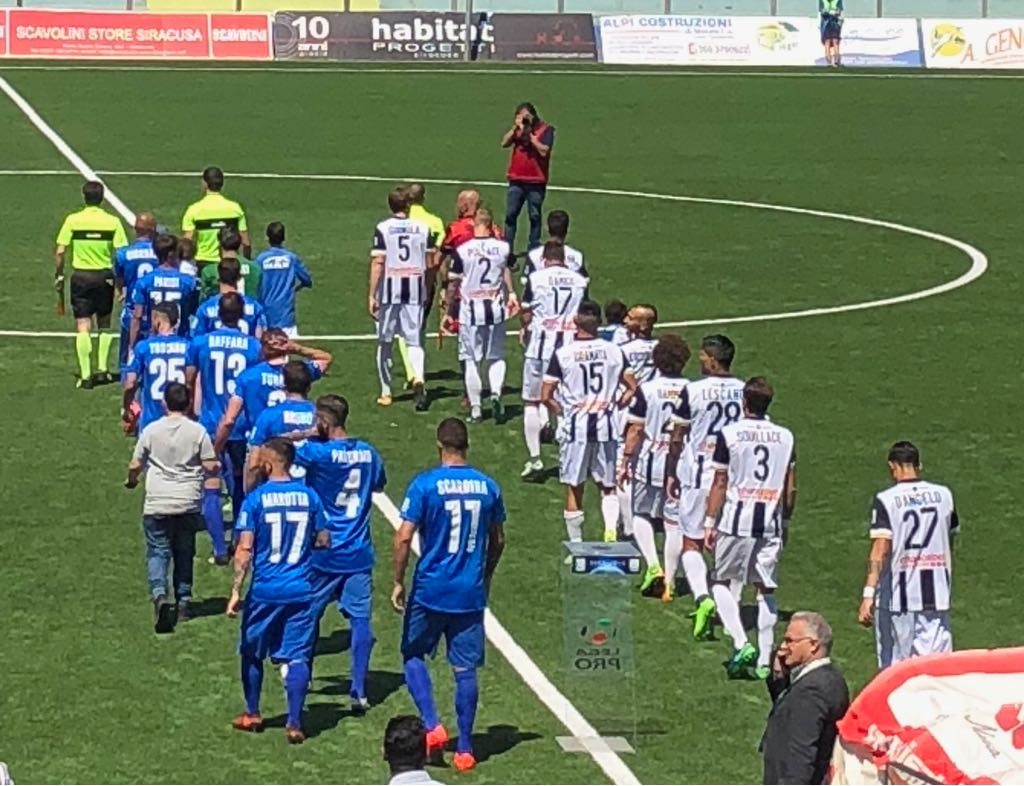
Leonzio vs Siracusa in Serie C on 6 May 2018.

After a difficult start in the 2017–18, in which Leonzio had won only three of 16 matches, Rigoli was replaced by Aimo Diana as manager on December 5, 2017. With Diana as a manager, Sicula Leonzio achieved a final tenth place, which meant participating in the promotion playoffs that the club, however, lost against Cosenza Calcio.

For the new season, Leonzio appointed Paolo Bianco as manager in July 2018. However, Bianco resigned in December 2018, replaced by Vincenzo Torrente. Torrente leaves the managerial role at the end of the season, with the club finishing 13th in the league.

The 2019–20 season saw Vito Grieco appointed as manager, temporarily replaced by Giovanni Bucaro amid disappointing results. Although the team managed to avoid relegation by winning the playoffs against Bisceglie, the club was dismissed in August 2020 following the failure to register the team to the 2020–21 Serie C season because of judiciary issues faced by President Giuseppe Leonardi.

=== The short-lived F.C. Leonzio 1909 (2021) ===
In August 2021, a new club, named Associazione Sportiva Dilettantistica FC Leonzio 1909 and formed from the title of A.S.D. Siracusa, was admitted to Eccellenza. After two consecutive withdrawals, Leonzio was excluded from the league by the Lega Nazionale Dilettanti.

=== Another refoundation: S.S. Leonzio 1909 (2022–) ===
In the summer of 2022, the club was once again refounded under the denomination of Associazione Sportiva Dilettantistica Società Sportiva Leonzio 1909 and the presidency of Gaetano Vinci. They were admitted to the 2022–23 Eccellenza, where they finished in fourth place but lost the playoff semifinal 3–2 after extra time to Città di Taormina. In the following season, Leonzio finished 14th, but won the playout final against Messana to avoid relegation. In the 2024–25 Eccellenza season, Leonzio finished eighth, improved to sixth place in 2025–26.

Ahead of the 2026–27 season, Leonzio appointed Giuseppe Calvaruso as head coach under the presidency of Gaetano Nardo, who had previously served as vice-president following the club's 2022 refoundation. The season also saw the reopening of the Stadio Angelino Nobile to spectators following several months of closure.

== Colours and badge ==
Leonzio's colours are black and white.

== Stadium ==
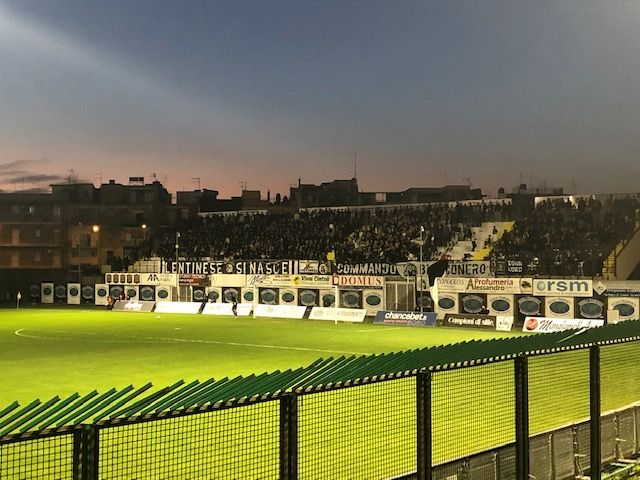
The Angelino Nobile's terrace

Leonzio plays its home matches at the Stadio Angelino Nobile, which has a capacity of c. 3,500.

From 2018 to 2020, Leonzio's stadium, Angelino Nobile, was named Sicula Trasporti Stadium–Stadio Angelino Nobile for sponsorship reasons; before July 2018, it was known as Stadio Angelino Nobile.

== Honours ==
=== Sub-national titles ===
Serie C2

- Promoted: 1992–93

Serie D

- Promoted: 2016–17
- Runners-up: 1972–73 (Girone I)
