= 1956–57 Serie B =

Italian football league season

Serie B
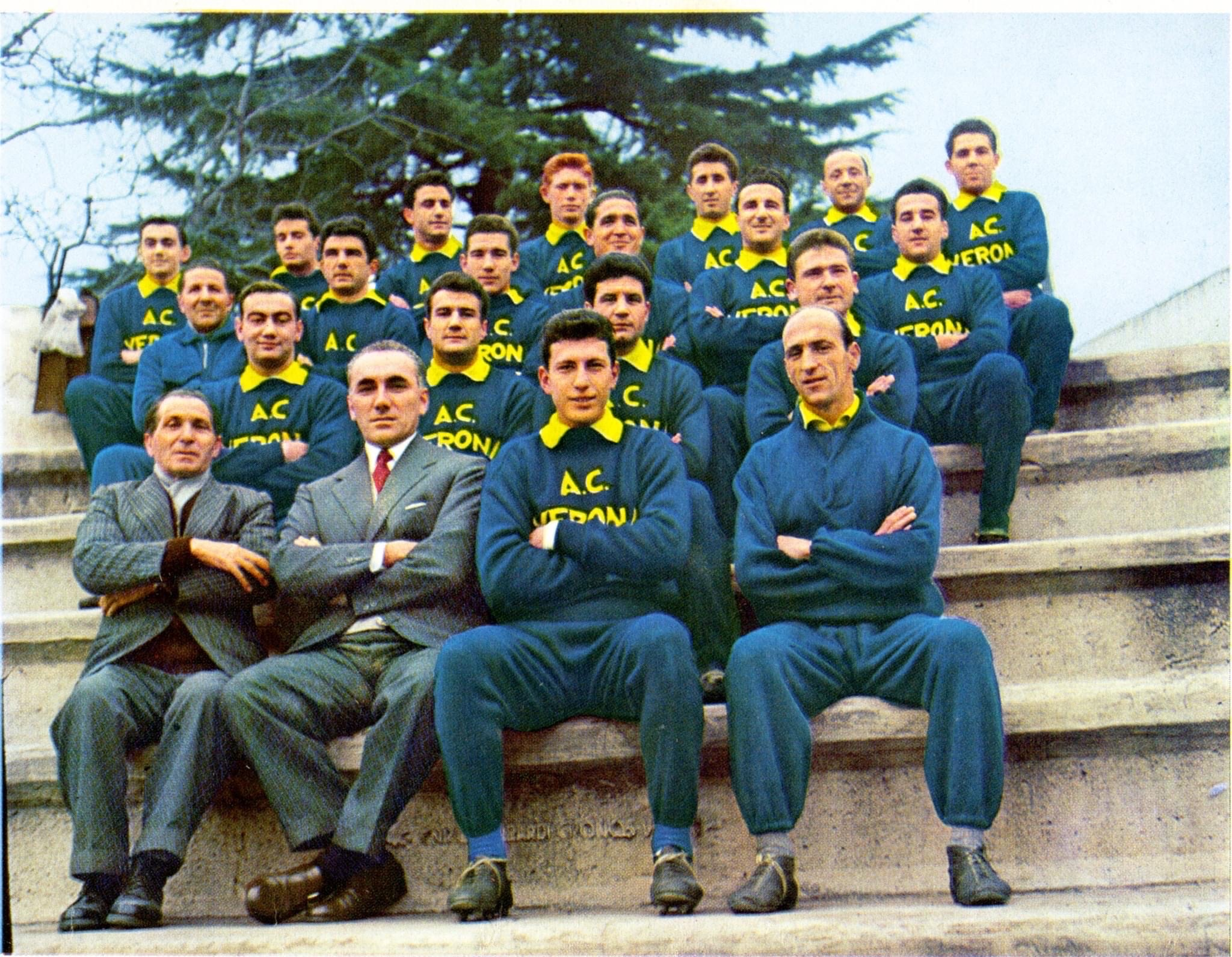
- 1956–57 Serie B winning Verona squad
- Season: 1956–57
- Champions: Verona; 1st title

Serie B 1956-57 team distribution

The Serie B 1956–57 was the twenty-fifth tournament of this competition played in Italy since its creation.

== Teams ==
Venezia and Sambenedettese had been promoted from Serie C, while Novara and Pro Patria had been relegated from Serie A.

== Final classification ==
Pos	Team	Pld	W	D	L	GF	GA	GR	Pts	Promotion or relegation
1	Verona (P, C)	34	17	10	7	46	29	1.586	44	Promotion to Serie A
2	Alessandria (P)	34	17	9	8	57	36	1.583	43	Serie A after tie-breaker
3	Brescia	34	19	5	10	42	29	1.448	43	Promotion tie-breaker
4	Catania	34	18	6	10	53	31	1.710	42	
5	Venezia	34	15	11	8	46	27	1.704	41	
6	Novara	34	11	14	9	39	38	1.026	36	
6	Como	34	13	10	11	37	38	0.974	36	
8	Simmenthal-Monza	34	14	6	14	44	44	1.000	34	
9	Marzotto	34	10	13	11	38	40	0.950	33	
10	Cagliari	34	11	10	13	30	34	0.882	32	
10	Bari	34	12	8	14	31	41	0.756	32	
12	Parma	34	9	13	12	33	38	0.868	31	
12	Modena (Note: Modena F.C. changed its name to Zenit Modena F.C. at the end of the season.)	34	11	9	14	32	37	0.865	31	
14	Messina	34	9	11	14	28	35	0.800	29	
14	Sambenedettese	34	8	13	13	32	45	0.711	29	
16	Taranto	34	10	8	16	35	47	0.745	28	
17	Pro Patria (R)	34	7	11	16	35	49	0.714	25	Relegation to Serie C
18	Legnano (R)	34	7	9	18	31	51	0.608	23	Relegation to Serie C

Source: Panini
(C) Champions; (P) Promoted; (R) Relegated

== Results ==
Home \ Away	ALE	BAR	BRE	CAG	CTN	COM	LEG	MAR	MES	MOD	NOV	PAR	PPA	SBN	SMN	TAR	VEN	HEL
Alessandria		4–2	2–1	1–1	1–0	3–3	4–2	0–0	3–1	2–0	2–0	2–0	2–1	4–1	2–0	3–1	1–1	3–1
Bari	0–0		4–1	0–0	1–0	1–0	0–1	0–1	1–0	1–0	2–2	0–2	2–1	2–0	1–0	3–2	0–2	2–1
Brescia	1–0	4–1		2–1	0–1	2–0	1–0	1–1	2–1	2–0	1–0	2–0	2–2	0–0	1–0	2–0	1–0	0–1
Cagliari	0–0	0–0	1–0		1–0	3–0	1–1	2–0	1–0	0–1	1–1	2–0	2–1	1–1	0–2	0–0	2–0	3–1
Catania	2–2	1–0	2–0	2–1		3–0	3–0	3–0	1–0	1–0	4–1	2–1	2–0	0–0	3–1	2–0	1–1	1–1
Como	1–0	2–0	1–2	1–0	1–0		1–1	3–1	1–0	2–1	0–2	0–1	2–2	1–0	2–1	3–1	1–0	4–3
Legnano	3–2	0–0	0–1	3–2	1–1	0–0		1–1	2–0	1–2	1–2	1–2	1–0	1–1	1–1	2–1	0–1	2–1
Marzotto	1–2	1–1	1–0	0–0	1–4	2–1	2–0		0–1	1–0	0–0	3–1	2–1	4–1	2–2	0–1	1–2	2–0
Messina	1–1	1–0	0–1	2–0	1–3	0–0	1–0	2–2		1–0	0–0	2–2	0–0	3–0	0–0	2–0	2–0	0–0
Modena	2–3	1–1	0–1	1–0	1–0	2–1	3–0	1–1	1–1		3–1	2–0	0–1	0–0	2–1	3–2	0–0	1–1
Novara	0–4	5–3	4–0	3–0	1–1	0–0	2–0	1–1	1–0	5–1		1–0	0–0	2–1	1–0	0–0	1–1	0–0
Parma	2–0	0–0	0–0	4–0	2–1	0–0	2–1	0–0	2–1	0–0	0–0		2–2	4–0	2–3	1–1	0–0	0–2
Pro Patria	0–1	1–0	2–2	1–2	2–3	1–3	2–1	1–3	2–2	1–1	2–2	0–0		4–1	2–1	1–0	0–3	1–2
Sambenedettese	1–1	0–1	2–1	0–0	0–2	1–1	2–0	3–1	2–1	0–2	0–0	1–1	2–0		4–0	3–0	1–1	0–2
Simm.-Monza	2–1	0–1	1–4	2–0	2–1	0–0	1–1	2–1	4–0	2–0	1–0	3–0	0–1	3–1		3–2	3–1	2–0
Taranto	2–1	3–1	0–3	1–2	2–1	2–1	4–1	1–0	0–0	0–0	2–0	4–1	0–0	0–1	2–0		1–1	0–0
Venezia	2–0	1–0	0–1	2–1	3–0	2–0	2–1	1–1	1–2	2–1	4–0	1–1	2–0	1–1	5–1	2–0		0–0
Hellas Verona	1–0	4–0	1–0	1–0	3–2	1–1	2–1	1–1	2–0	2–0	3–1	1–0	1–0	1–1	0–0	4–0	2–1	

Source: Almanacco Illustrato del Calcio - La Storia 1898-2004, Panini Edizioni, Modena, September 2005 (in Italian)
Legend: Blue = home team win; Yellow = draw; Red = away team win.

== Promotion tie-breaker ==
Team 1	Score	Team 2
Alessandria (Italy)	2-1	(Italy) Brescia

Alessandria promoted to Serie A.

== References and sources ==
- Almanacco Illustrato del Calcio - La Storia 1898-2004, Panini Edizioni, Modena, September 2005
