= Bilal Erradi =

Italian footballer (born 2001)

Personal information
- Date of birth: 22 February 2001 (age 25)
- Place of birth: Borgomanero, Italy
- Height: 1.75 m (5 ft 9 in)
- Position: Midfielder

Team information
- Current team: Pescara
- Number: 27

Youth career
- Pro Vercelli

Senior career*
Years	Team	Apps	(Gls)
2019–2022	Pro Vercelli	28	(0)
2022–2023	Juve Stabia	2	(1)
2023	Sorrento	12	(3)
2023–2024	Juve Stabia	29	(2)
2024–2026	Potenza	51	(3)
2026–	Pescara	0	(0)
- * Club domestic league appearances and goals as of 26 April 2026

Bilal Erradi (born 22 February 2001) is an Italian professional footballer who plays as a midfielder for Serie C Group B club Pescara.

== Club career ==
Formed in Pro Vercelli youth system, Erradi made his first team debut for Serie C on 25 September 2019 against Pontedera.

On 15 May 2021, he extended his contract with the club.

On 18 January 2022, he moved to Juve Stabia. Erradi's contract with Juve Stabia was terminated by mutual consent on 18 January 2023.

On 1 July 2024, Erradi signed a two-year contract with Potenza.
