= Giovanni Galeone =

Italian football player and manager (1941–2025)

Personal information
- Date of birth: 25 January 1941
- Place of birth: Naples, Italy
- Date of death: 2 November 2025 (aged 84)
- Place of death: Udine, Italy
- Height: 1.75 m (5 ft 9 in)
- Position: Midfielder

Senior career*
Years	Team	Apps	(Gls)
1957–1958	Ponziana Trieste		
1958–1959	Monza		
1959–1960	Arezzo		
1960–1961	Avellino		
1962–1963	Vis Pesaro		
1963–1964	Nuorese		
1964–1965	Entella		
1965–1966	Monfalcone		
1966–1974	Udinese		

Managerial career
- 1975–1976: Pordenone
- 1976–1977: Adriese
- 1978–1979: Cremonese
- 1979–1980: Sangiovannese
- 1980–1981: Grosseto
- 1981–1983: Udinese (youth team)
- 1983–1986: SPAL
- 1986–1989: Pescara
- 1989–1990: Como
- 1990–1993: Pescara
- 1994–1995: Udinese
- 1995–1997: Perugia
- 1997–1998: Napoli
- 1999–2001: Pescara
- 2003–2004: Ancona
- 2006–2007: Udinese
- * Club domestic league appearances and goals

Giovanni Galeone (25 January 1941 – 2 November 2025) was an Italian football manager and player.

== Playing career ==
Galeone, born in Naples, moved to Northern Italy in his youth, and played as a midfielder for eight different teams between 1957 and 1966. That summer, he moved to Udinese, where he played for the rest of his career.

== Managerial career ==
Galeone started his coaching career at the age of 34 for Serie D team Pordenone, in 1975–76, securing eleventh place in the league in his debut season. His first coaching experience in a professional league came in the 1978–79 season for Cremonese in Serie C1, but ended soon with his dismissal.

After a few other experiences, including three fairly successful seasons at SPAL in Serie C1, in 1986–87, Galeone signed for Serie B team Pescara. In his first season at the club, he led the team to the Serie B championship title, which also meant a promotion to Serie A. The following season, under his management, Pescara managed not to be relegated from Serie A for the first time in the club's history. He left Pescara in 1989, when Pescara was relegated to Serie B, but returned to the club a year later and secured another promotion to Serie A in 1991–92.

Galeone then served as head coach for Udinese Calcio in 1994–95, obtaining a Serie A promotion, Perugia in 1995–96, where he obtained his fourth and final Serie A promotion, and Napoli in 1997–98. He returned to Pescara for the third time in 1999, managing the team for two seasons.

In his later years, he managed Ancona in 2003–04 and Udinese in 2006–07. In July 2007, he returned to Pescara one last time, this time as a technical consultant, but left the club after only a month.

== Style of management ==
Galeone was a strong advocate of the 4–3–3 formation, zonal marking, and an attacking style of playing, which, alongside Arrigo Sacchi, made him one of the most innovative Italian football coaches in the late 1980s; his system was inspired by that of Nils Liedholm, is often retroactively compared to that of Zdeněk Zeman, who also later used a 4–3–3 formation with a strong attacking philosophy.

== Death ==
Galeone died on 2 November 2025, aged 84, in Udine, Italy.
