= Ferdinando Piro =

Italian footballer

Personal information
- Date of birth: 12 June 1977 (age 49)
- Place of birth: Naples, Italy
- Positions: Midfielder; forward

Senior career*
Years	Team	Apps	(Gls)
1995	Nocerina	4	(0)
1995–1997	Parma	6	(1)
1996–1997	→ Pro Patria (loan)	27	(1)
1997	Varese	5	(0)
1997–1998	Solbiatese Arno	24	(1)
1998–1999	Valle d'Aosta		
1999–2001	Moncalieri		
2001–2003	Ivrea		
2003–2004	Sant'Angelo		
2005	Villacidrese		
2005–2006	Como		
2006	Castellana		
2006–2007	Renate		
2008–2010	Meletolese		
2011	Pro Piacenza		
2013–2014	Montecchio Maggiore		
2014–2015	Biancazzurra		
2016	Luzzara		
2017	Colorno		
2018	Viadana		
2019–2020	Terme Monticelli		
- * Club domestic league appearances and goals

Ferdinando Piro (born 12 June 1977) is an Italian former footballer.

== Career ==
For the 1995–96 season, Piro signed for Parma in the Serie A from Nocerina in the Serie C2. However, he suffered injuries during his stint there and was sent on loan to Pro Patria. By 2001, he was playing in Serie D, the Italian fourth division. In the amateur leagues, Piro claimed "there is an impressive presumption, some people do not accept the fact that you can teach something and are only afraid that you will steal their place".
