= Scafa =

- Comune
- Comune di Scafa
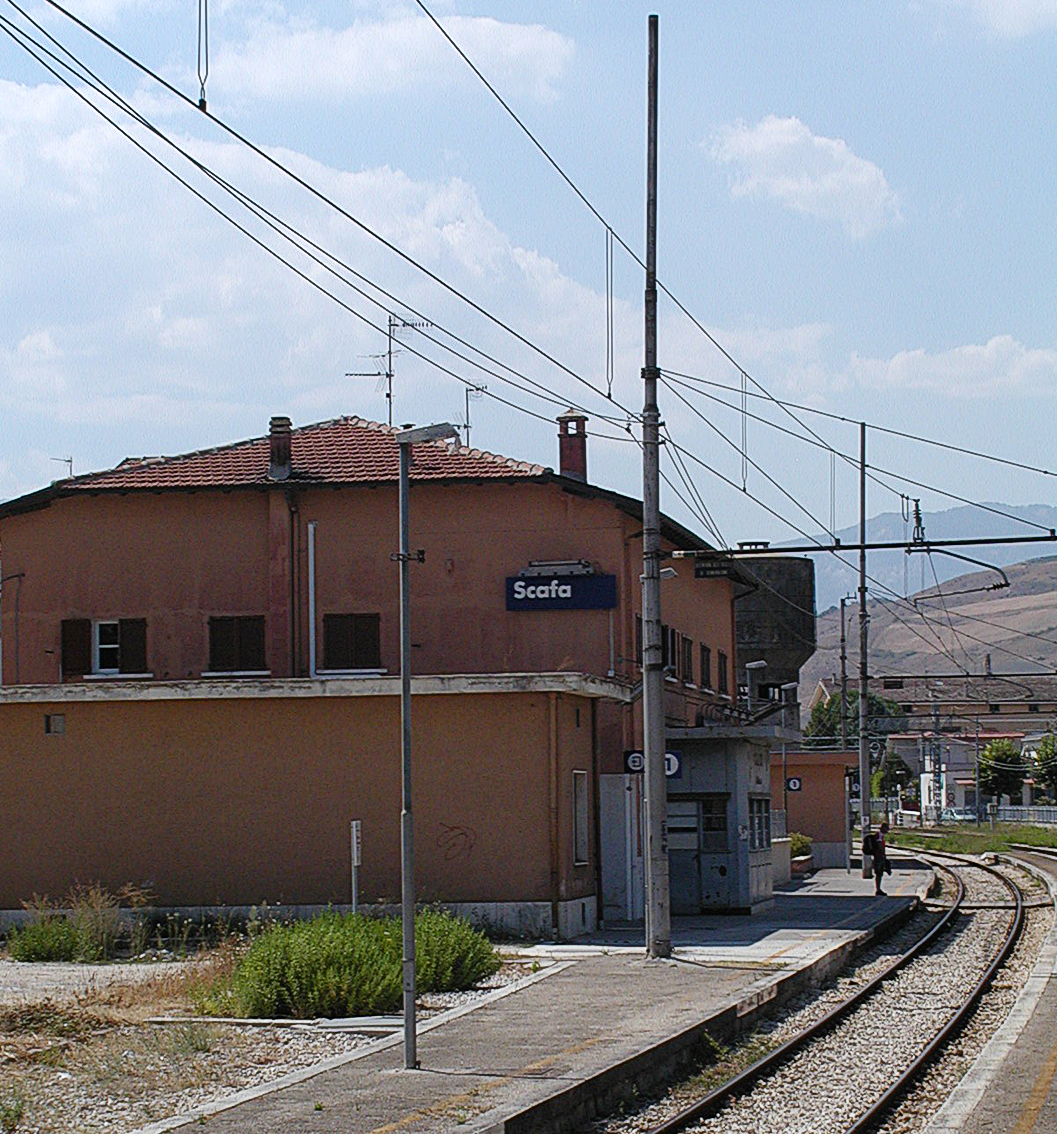
- View of Scafa

- Location within Italy Location within Abruzzo
- Coordinates: 42°16′N 14°1′E
- Country: Italy
- Region: Abruzzo
- Province: Pescara (PE)
- Frazioni: Colli Mampioppo, Crosta, Decontra, Marulli, Pianapuccia, Zappino

Government
  - Mayor: Maurizio Giancola

Area
  - Total: 10.34 km^{2} (3.99 sq mi)
- Elevation: 108 m (354 ft)

Population (28 February 2017)
  - Total: 3,712
  - Density: 359.0/km^{2} (929.8/sq mi)
- Demonym: Scafaroli
- Time zone: UTC+1 (CET)
  - Summer (DST): UTC+2 (CEST)
- Postal code: 65027
- Dialing code: 085
- Website: Official website

Scafa is a comune and town in the Province of Pescara in the Abruzzo region of Italy. It has an exit of the motorway between Pescara and Rome. Its lively center offers the surrounding communities many of the services that a bigger city would provide. Examples include a 24 hr Carrefour Market, two self-service laundromats and a public pool. The two driving schools and multiple small shops offer a variety of products. Nearby the Parco Lavino offers opportunities to connect to nature. The high sulfur content of the pools above the historic mill vary in color from deep blue to aquamarine to cloudy pale baby blue. The nearby GlobuliGreen geodome offers a cool comfortable and meditative place to enjoy music, performances, and social connection.
