= Domenico Rosati =

Italian politician (1929–2024)

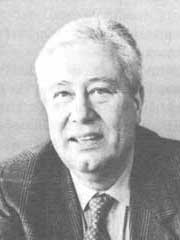

Member of the Senate of the Republic of Italy for Arezzo
- In office 2 July 1987 – 22 April 1992

Personal details
- Born: 5 February 1929 Vetralla (Viterbo), Italy
- Died: 14 October 2024 (aged 95) Rome, Italy
- Party: DC
- Education: Sapienza University of Rome
- Occupation: Trade unionist

Domenico Rosati (5 February 1929 – 14 October 2024) was an Italian trade unionist and politician. A member of Christian Democracy, he served in the Senate of the Republic from 1987 to 1992. He was a graduate in law from the University of Rome, a professional journalist, and he has worked in the ACLI (Christian Associations of Italian Workers) since the 1950s, first as director of the periodical Azione Sociale, then as a member of the Presidency Council since 1968. In 1972 he became vice president, and was national president of the ACLI from 30 May 1976 to 12 May 1987. His election as national president took place on the basis of a document approved unanimously by the National Council of the ACLI which committed the movement to operate within the ecclesiastical community and confirmed the class and anti-capitalist choice and in particular the legitimacy of the political pluralism of Catholics. Under his presidency, a solid relationship was re-established between the association and the ecclesiastical hierarchy, a relationship which had weakened considerably at the beginning of the 1970s, following the condemnation of Pope Paul VI (19 June 1971). Rosati wanted to give ACLI the imprint of a "civil society movement for the reform of politics" that would be characterized by the themes of peace, work and democracy, not in opposition to the parties but for their regeneration.

Rosati died in Rome on 14 October 2024, at the age of 95.
