= Aurora Pro Patria 1919 =

Italian football club

Pro Patria
- Full name: Aurora Pro Patria 1919 S.r.l.
- Nickname: I Tigrotti (The Little Tigers)
- Founded: 1919; 107 years ago 1995; 31 years ago (refounded); 2009; 17 years ago (refounded)
- Ground: Stadio Carlo Speroni, Busto Arsizio, Italy
- Capacity: 4,627
- President: Patrizia Testa
- Manager: Leandro Greco
- League: Serie D
- 2025–26: Serie C Group A, 19th of 20 (relegated)
- Website: http://www.aurorapropatria1919.com/
Home colours	Away colours

Aurora Pro Patria 1919, commonly referred to as Pro Patria, is an Italian football club based in Busto Arsizio, Lombardy. It currently plays in Serie C, group A. In Latin, Pro Patria translates to "For the Fatherland".

== History ==
=== Pro Patria et Libertate ===
The club was founded in 1919.

The club has played in Serie A fourteen times mostly during the first half of the 20th century, the last time being in 1955–56.

In 1995 the club, then officially named Pro Patria et Libertate, was disqualified from Serie D.

=== Pro Patria Gallaratese G.B. ===
The Gallaratese of Gallarate was admitted to Serie C2, in order to keep the historical brand alive, it changed its name to Pro Patria Gallaratese G.B. (G.B. being for Gallarate and Busto Arsizio, respectively): the club is considered the direct heir of Pro Patria et Libertate.

The club played in the fourth tier until 2002, when the club won promotion to Serie C1 via the playoffs. In 2008 the club was relegated to Serie C2 after losing in the playoffs to Hellas Verona by 2–1 on aggregate, but was later readmitted to Lega Pro Prima Divisione to fill a vacancy.

In June 2008, a club takeover was completed and ambitious plans for a return to Serie B were unveiled. However, impressive performances in the Lega Pro Prima Divisione 2008–09 were accompanied by financial troubles, which led to the club being declared insolvent by the local magistrate in April 2009 due to excessive financial debts. The club's president was later arrested and has to stand trial on charges related to the bankruptcy. The drive to Serie B came to nothing for the team in a most bitter way; badly losing the home return match of their playoff final against Padova, who played with 10 men after an early sending off.

=== Aurora Pro Patria 1919 ===
On 27 June 2009 Aurora Pro Patria 1919, owned by the Tesoro family, construction businessmen from Apulia, acquired the sports title from the liquidator of the old company.

In the season 2009–10 it was relegated to Lega Pro Seconda Divisione. In the 2012–13 season it was promoted to Lega Pro Prima Divisione. In the 2014–15 season it was relegated to Serie D, but it was readmitted to Lega Pro to fill vacancies. However, a second consecutive relegation to Serie D brought the club down to the amateur levels of Italian football. Pro Patria is one of the most important football clubs in the Varese area but due to recent performances on the pitch, the team has never been able to reach the same level of fame as before.

==== 2013 racism incident ====
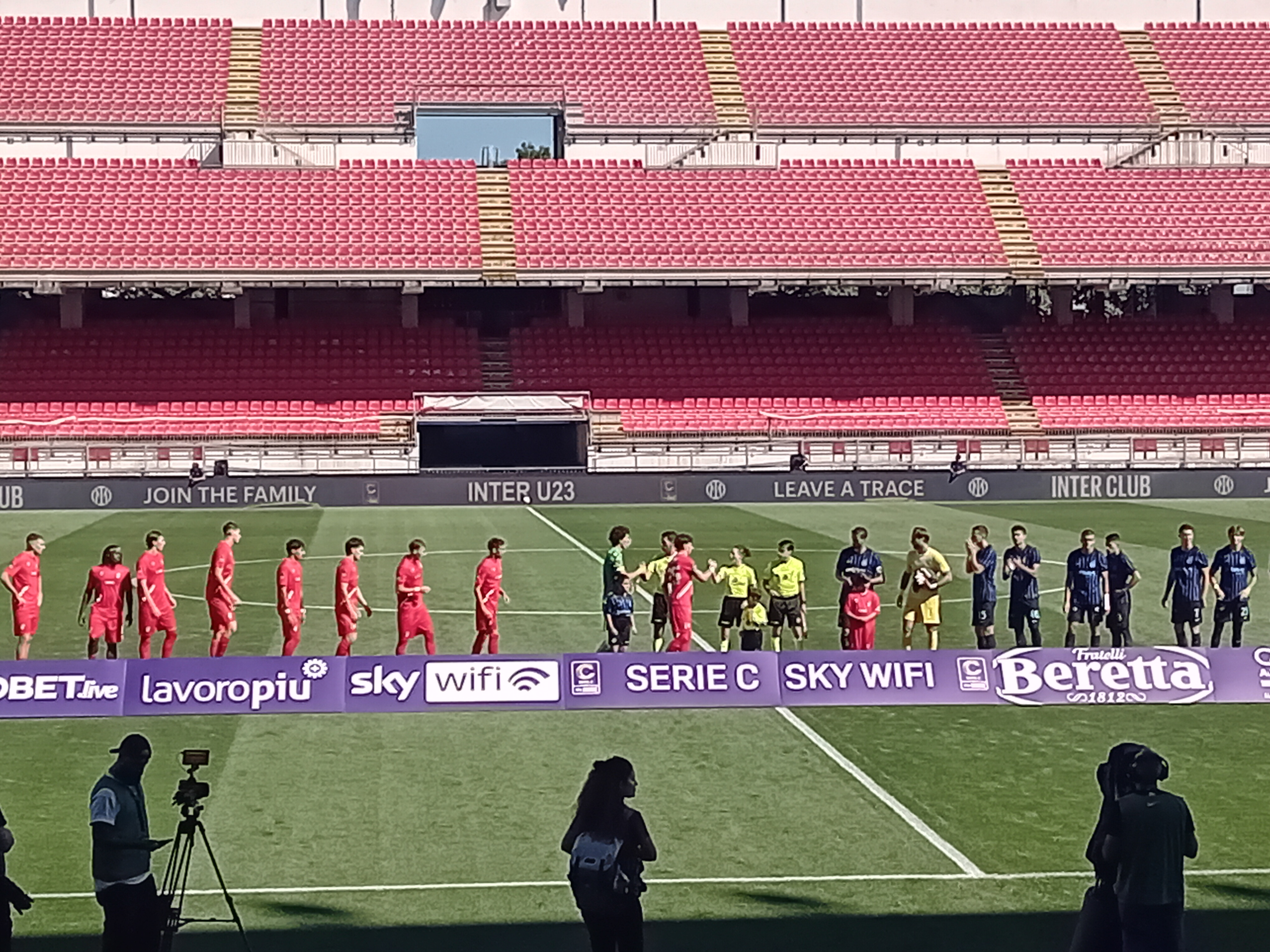
Inter U23 Vs Pro Patria in 2025

On 3 January 2013, the club was hosting A.C. Milan in a friendly match, when a small group of people in the crowd aimed abusive chants at brown skinned A.C. Milan players, including M'Baye Niang, Urby Emanuelson, Sulley Muntari and Kevin-Prince Boateng. Boateng reacted angrily, kicking the ball into the stands, before the entire Milan team walked off the field in protest, causing the game to be abandoned. The final verdict on the incident, however, stated that the punishment handed down was not in reference to racism allegations. Pro Patria was forced to play one game behind closed doors because of this incident.

== Players ==
=== Current squad ===
As of 2 February 2026

Note: Flags indicate national team as defined under FIFA eligibility rules; some limited exceptions apply. Players may hold more than one non-FIFA nationality.

No.	Pos.	Nation	Player
1	GK	ITA	William Rovida
4	MF	ITA	Pietro Reggiori
5	MF	ITA	Alessandro Di Munno
6	DF	ITA	Alessandro Sassaro
7	FW	ITA	Alessandro Orfei
8	MF	ITA	Andrea Schiavone
9	FW	ITA	King Udoh
10	FW	ITA	Ferdinando Mastroianni
11	FW	FRA	Bertony Renelus
12	GK	ITA	Ryan Gnonto
13	DF	ITA	Tommaso Aliata
14	FW	ITA	Giorgio Citterio
17	MF	EST	Georgi Tunjov
19	DF	ITA	Christian Travaglini

No.	Pos.	Nation	Player
20	DF	ITA	Christian Mora
21	MF	ITA	Tommaso Ricordi
22	GK	ITA	Matteo Zamarian (on loan from Inter U23)
23	MF	ITA	Jacopo Frosali (on loan from Pisa)
24	MF	ITA	Andrea Marra
25	MF	ITA	Davide Ferri
26	DF	ITA	Alberto Masi
27	FW	ITA	Luca Giudici
28	GK	ITA	Andrea Sala
30	FW	ITA	Leonardo Ferrario
31	DF	ITA	Gian Filippo Felicioli
39	DF	ITA	Mattia Motolese (on loan from Bologna)
40	MF	ITA	Thomas Schirò
70	FW	ITA	Jacopo Desogus (on loan from Cittadella)

=== Out on loan ===
Note: Flags indicate national team as defined under FIFA eligibility rules; some limited exceptions apply. Players may hold more than one non-FIFA nationality.

No.	Pos.	Nation	Player
—	DF	ITA	Christian Dimarco (at Foggia until 30 June 2026)
—	DF	ITA	Matteo Viti (at Imperia until 30 June 2026)

No.	Pos.	Nation	Player
—	MF	ITA	Niccolò Bagatti (at Monopoli until 30 June 2026)
—	FW	ITA	Simone Andrea Ganz (at Piacenza until 30 June 2026)

== Supporters ==
=== Twinning and rivalries ===
The Pro Patria supporters are twinned with those of Triestina Pro Patria supporters are divided by rivalries with Novara and Legnano

== Notable former players ==
- (Italy) Ferdinando Piro
- (Italy) Bruno Bolchi
- (Romania) Norberto Hofling
- (Italy) Federico Gatti
- (Hungary) László Kubala

== Honours ==
- Serie B

Winners: 1946–47 (Group A)

- Serie D

Winners: 2017–18

== Divisional movements ==
Series	Years	First	Last	Promotions	Relegations
A	12	1929–30	1955–56		▼3 (1933, 1953, 1956)
B	13	1933–34	1965–66	▲3 (1927, 1947, 1954)	▼3 (1935, 1957, 1966)
C +C2	38 +19	1935–36	2025–26	▲2 (1941, 1960) ▲3 (1982 C2, 2002 C2, 2013 C2)	▼3 (1978 C1, 1983 C1, 2010 C1) ▼4 (1972, 1988, 2016, 2026)
82 out of 94 years of professional football in Italy since 1929
D	10	1972–73	2017–18	▲3 (1975, 1995, 2018)	▼1 (1992)
E	2	1992–93	1993–94	▲1 (1994)	never
