= Fontecchio =

- Comune
- Comune di Fontecchio
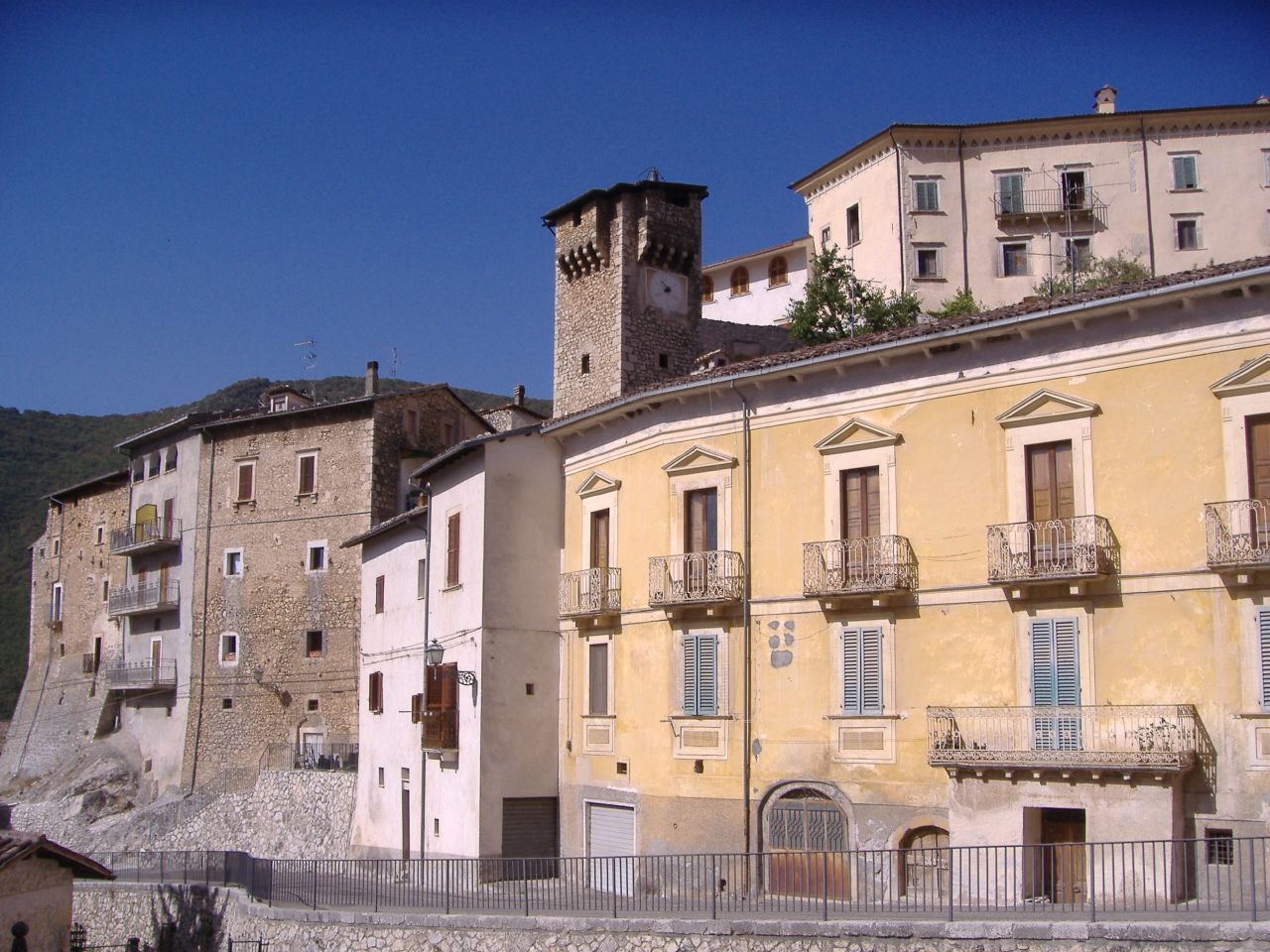

- Location within Abruzzo
- Coordinates: 42°13′50″N 13°36′24″E
- Country: Italy
- Region: Abruzzo
- Province: L'Aquila (AQ)
- Frazioni: San Pio di Fontecchio

Government
  - Mayor: Sabrina Ciancone (since March 30, 2010) (Dalla parte di Fontecchio - On the Side of Fontecchio)

Area
  - Total: 16.89 km^{2} (6.52 sq mi)
- Elevation: 668 m (2,192 ft)

Population (December 31, 2014)
  - Total: 401
  - Density: 23.7/km^{2} (61.5/sq mi)
- Demonym: Fontecchiani or Fonticulani
- Time zone: UTC+1 (CET)
  - Summer (DST): UTC+2 (CEST)
- Postal code: 67020
- Dialing code: 0862
- Patron saint: Saint Blaise
- Saint day: February 3
- Website: http://www.fontecchio.gov.it/

Fontecchio is a comune and town in the Province of L'Aquila in the Abruzzo region of Italy. The small, medieval village is located within the Monte Sirente community and the Sirente-Velino Regional Park.

== History ==
There is archaeological evidence of the Roman settlement of Fonticulanum down on the Aterno river. In the Middle Ages a castle was built on top of the hill and the population moved up there. The condottiero Braccio da Montone ("Fortebraccio") (1368–1424) tried and failed to capture the castle in the 14th century.

Today you can see a well conserved historical centre. Many fragments of ancient monuments are displayed in the L'Aquila museum.

== Transport ==
Fontecchio has a stop on the Terni–Sulmona railway, with trains to L'Aquila and Sulmona.
