= 1973–74 Serie C =

The 1973–74 Serie C was the thirty-sixth edition of Serie C, the third highest league in the Italian football league system.

== Girone A ==
Serie C Gir. A 1973-74 team distribution
Serie C Gir. B 1973-74 team distribution
Serie C Gir. B 1973-74 team distribution in Tuscany
Serie C Gir. C 1973-74 team distribution
Serie C Gir. C 1973-74 team distribution in Campania

Pos	Team	Pld	W	D	L	GF	GA	GD	Pts	Promotion or relegation
1	Alessandria	38	21	11	6	39	17	+22	53	Promoted to Serie B
2	Udinese	38	18	11	9	49	29	+20	47	
3	Monza	38	18	10	10	43	28	+15	46	
4	Venezia	38	15	16	7	41	30	+11	46	
5	Lecco	38	15	15	8	38	21	+17	45	
6	Seregno	38	17	10	11	37	30	+7	44	
7	Mantova	38	13	15	10	34	31	+3	41	
8	Pro Vercelli	38	12	15	11	40	26	+14	39	
9	Vigevano	38	15	9	14	43	38	+5	39	
10	Bolzano	38	15	9	14	37	33	+4	39	
11	Belluno	38	11	15	12	44	41	+3	37	
12	Solbiatese	38	12	13	13	24	34	−10	37	
13	Trento	38	10	15	13	33	33	0	35	
14	Padova	38	11	13	14	34	41	−7	35	
15	Legnano	38	9	15	14	27	36	−9	33	
16	Gavinovese	38	9	15	14	31	50	−19	33	
17	Clodiasottomarina	38	9	14	15	25	39	−14	32	
18	Savona	38	9	13	16	28	39	−11	31	Relegated to Serie D
19	Triestina	38	6	14	18	22	44	−22	26	Relegated to Serie D
20	Derthona	38	4	14	20	19	48	−29	22	Relegated to Serie D

== Girone B ==
Pos	Team	Pld	W	D	L	GF	GA	GD	Pts	Promotion or relegation
1	Sambenedettese	38	22	10	6	49	25	+24	54	Promoted to Serie B
2	Rimini	38	16	13	9	49	29	+20	45	
3	Lucchese	38	12	20	6	36	27	+9	44	
4	Massese	38	15	13	10	37	25	+12	43	
5	Piacenza	38	14	15	9	38	29	+9	43	
6	Pisa	38	14	14	10	30	26	+4	42	
7	Modena	38	14	13	11	40	35	+5	41	
8	Cremonese	38	11	18	9	38	33	+5	40	
9	Grosseto	38	13	13	12	41	33	+8	39	
10	Giulianova	38	11	17	10	31	27	+4	39	
11	Spezia	38	11	16	11	33	27	+6	38	
12	Riccione	38	9	20	9	30	33	−3	38	
13	Livorno	38	10	15	13	26	32	−6	35	
14	Empoli	38	12	10	16	32	38	−6	34	
15	Torres	38	10	14	14	29	35	−6	34	
16	Ravenna	38	11	12	15	28	34	−6	34	
17	Aquila Montevarchi	38	10	14	14	22	35	−13	34	
18	Viareggio	38	8	16	14	26	31	−5	32	Relegated to Serie D
19	Olbia	38	10	11	17	27	44	−17	31	Relegated to Serie D
20	Prato	38	4	12	22	19	63	−44	20	Relegated to Serie D

== Girone C ==
Pos	Team	Pld	W	D	L	GF	GA	GD	Pts	Promotion or relegation
1	Pescara	38	19	16	3	43	17	+26	54	Promoted to Serie B
2	Lecce	38	20	14	4	46	18	+28	53 (Note: 1 point deducted.)	
3	Casertana	38	17	11	10	41	24	+17	45	
4	Nocerina	38	13	19	6	36	26	+10	45	
5	Turris	38	15	11	12	44	35	+9	41	
6	Sorrento	38	13	12	13	32	30	+2	38	
7	Siracusa	38	12	14	12	27	31	−4	38	
8	Salernitana	38	13	11	14	31	29	+2	37	
9	Frosinone	38	11	15	12	30	32	−2	37	
10	Trapani	38	9	19	10	29	32	−3	37	
11	Chieti	38	11	14	13	43	42	+1	36	
12	Acireale	38	11	14	13	28	27	+1	36	
13	Crotone	38	10	16	12	26	35	−9	36	
14	Matera	38	14	7	17	33	37	−4	35	
15	Pro Vasto	38	10	15	13	26	33	−7	35	
16	Barletta	38	11	12	15	25	32	−7	34	
17	Marsala	38	9	15	14	24	37	−13	33	
18	Cosenza	38	9	15	14	25	41	−16	33 (Note: Relegated for goal difference.)	Relegated to Serie D
19	Juve Stabia	38	7	15	16	24	41	−17	29	Relegated to Serie D
20	Latina	38	5	17	16	15	29	−14	27	Relegated to Serie D

== References and sources ==
- Almanacco Illustrato del Calcio – La Storia 1898–2004, Panini Edizioni, Modena, September 2005
