= ASD Riccione 1929 =

Italian football club

Riccione
- Full name: Associazione Sportiva Dilettantistica Riccione 1929 s.r.l.
- Founded: 1929; 2010 (refounded)
- Ground: Stadio Italo Niccoletti, Riccione, Italy
- Capacity: 7,000
- Chairman: Paolo Croatti
- Manager: Andrea Benedetti
- League: Promozione
- 2012–13: Serie D/D, 13th
Home colours	Away colours

Associazione Sportiva Dilettantistica Riccione 1929 is an Italian football club located in Riccione, Emilia-Romagna. It currently plays in Promozione.

== History ==
=== Valleverde Riccione FC ===
Riccione was founded in 1929 as Valleverde Riccione Football Club. In summer 2010 his sports title of Serie D was transferred to Real Rimini, after the Batani family left the club because of management problems with the president Paolo Croatti.

=== ASD Riccione 1929 ===
The club was immediately refounded as Associazione sportiva dilettantistica Riccione 1929, acquiring the sports title of Eccellenza Emilia-Romagna club Associazione Sportiva Dilettantistica Del Conca, based in Morciano di Romagna.

The new team is the legitimate heir of the former Valleverde Riccione, finally having a company composed of people of Riccione.

In the 2010–11 season Riccione has won group B of Eccellenza Emilia-Romagna and has returned in Serie D.

== Colors and badge ==
Its colors are white and blue.
