= List of Serie C champions and promotions =

Serie C champions and promotions since its establishment, including the competition under previous names, are as follows:

== Seconda Divisione ==
Parentheses denote other teams promoted.

- 1926–27 – Monza, (Carrarese), (Ponziana), (Terni)
- 1927–28 – Edera Trieste, (Rivarolese), (Saronno), (Viareggio), (Seregno), (Forlì)
- 1928–29 – Vogherese, Vigevanesi, Pavia, Clarense, Mirandolese, Rovigo, Empoli

== Prima Divisione ==
Parentheses denote other teams promoted.

- 1929–30 – Udinese, (Libertas), (Derthona), (Palermo)
- 1930–31 – Comense, Vigevanesi, Cagliari
- 1931–32 – Giovanni Grion, Messina, Sampierdarenese
- 1932–33 – Initially: Perugia, Foggia, Vezio Parducci Viareggio, Following expansion: Catanzarese, Seregno, SPAL, Pavia, Vicenza, Derthona
- 1933–34 – Aquila, Pisa, Lucchese, Catania
- 1934–35 – Taranto, Siena

== Serie C (1935–78) ==
Parentheses denote other teams promoted.

- 1935–36 – Venezia, Cremonese, Spezia, Catanzaro
- 1936–37 – Padova, Vigevano, Sanremese, Anconitana, Taranto
- 1937–38 – SPAL, Fanfulla Lodi, Casale, Siena, Salernitana
- 1938–39 – Brescia, Catania
- 1939–40 – Reggiana, Vicenza, Maceratese
- 1940–41 – Prato, Fiumana
- 1941–42 – Cremonese, Juventina Palermo
- 1942–43 – Varese, Pro Gorizia
- 1943–45 – no national competition due to World War II
- 1945–46 – Mestrina, Prato, Perugia, Alba Ala Roma, Benevento, Lecce, Leone Palermo
- 1946–47 – Magenta, Vita Nova P.S. Pietro, Bolzano, Centese, Nocerina
- 1947–48 – competed amongst 18 regional leagues, no promotion to Serie B, no overall champions
- 1948–49 – Fanfulla Lodi, Udinese, Prato, Avellino
- 1949–50 – Seregno, Treviso, Anconitana, Messina
- 1950–51 – Monza, Marzotto Valdagno, Piombino, Juve Stabia
- 1951–52 – Cagliari
- 1952–53 – Pavia, (Alessandria)
- 1953–54 – Parma, (ArsenalTaranto)
- 1954–55 – Bari, (Livorno)
- 1955–56 – Venezia, (Sambenedettese)
- 1956–57 – Prato, (Lecco)
- 1957–58 – Reggiana, (Vigevano)
- 1958–59 – OZO Mantova, Catanzaro
- 1959–60 – Pro Patria, Prato, Foggia
- 1960–61 – Modena, Lucchese, Cosenza
- 1961–62 – Triestina, Cagliari, Foggia
- 1962–63 – Varese, Prato, Potenza
- 1963–64 – Reggiana, Livorno, Trani
- 1964–65 – Novara, Pisa, Reggina
- 1965–66 – Savona, Arezzo, Salernitana
- 1966–67 – Monza, Perugia, Bari
- 1967–68 – Como, Cesena, Ternana
- 1968–69 – Piacenza, Arezzo, Casertana
- 1969–70 – Novara, Massese, Casertana
- 1970–71 – Reggiana, Genoa, Sorrento
- 1971–72 – Lecco, Ascoli, Brindisi
- 1972–73 – Parma, SPAL, Avellino
- 1973–74 – Alessandria, Sambenedettese, Pescara
- 1974–75 – Piacenza, Modena, Catania
- 1975–76 – Monza, Rimini, Lecce
- 1976–77 – Cremonese, Pistoiese, Bari
- 1977–78 – Udinese, SPAL, Nocerina

== Serie C1 (1978–2008) ==
Group A

Season	Winner	Runner up
1978–79	Como	Parma
1979–80	Varese	Rimini
1980–81	Reggiana	Cremonese
1981–82	Atalanta	Monza
1982–83	Triestina	Padova
1983–84	Parma	Bologna
1984–85	Brescia	Lanerossi Vicenza
1985–86	Parma	Modena
1986–87	Piacenza	Padova
1987–88	Ancona	Monza
1988–89	Reggiana	Triestina
1989–90	Modena	Lucchese
1990–91	Piacenza	Venezia
1991–92	SPAL	Monza
1992–93	Ravenna	Vicenza

Group B

Season	Winner	Runner up
1978–79	Matera	Pisa
1979–80	Catania	Foggia
1980–81	Cavese	Sambenedettese
1981–82	Arezzo	Campobasso
1982–83	Empoli	Pescara
1983–84	Bari	Taranto
1984–85	Catanzaro	Palermo
1985–86	Messina	Taranto
1986–87	Catanzaro	Barletta
1987–88	Licata	Cosenza
1988–89	Cagliari	Foggia
1989–90	Taranto	Salernitana
1990–91	Casertana	Palermo
1991–92	Ternana	Fidelis Andria
1992–93	Palermo	Acireale

Season	Winner	Playoff Winner
1993–94	Chievo	Como
1994–95	Bologna	Pistoiese
1995–96	Ravenna	Empoli
1996–97	Treviso	Monza
1997–98	Cesena	Cremonese
1998–99	Alzano Virescit	Pistoiese
1999–00	Siena	Cittadella
2000–01	Modena	Como
2001–02	Livorno	Triestina
2002–03	Treviso	AlbinoLeffe
2003–04	Arezzo	Cesena
2004–05	Cremonese	Mantova
2005–06	Spezia	Genoa
2006–07	Grosseto	Pisa
2007–08	Sassuolo	Cittadella

Season	Winner	Playoff Winner
1993–94	Perugia	Salernitana
1994–95	Reggina	Avellino
1995–96	Lecce	Castel di Sangro
1996–97	Fidelis Andria	Ancona
1997–98	Cosenza	Ternana
1998–99	Fermana	Savoia
1999–00	Crotone	Ancona
2000–01	Palermo	Messina
2001–02	Ascoli	Catania
2002–03	Avellino	Pescara
2003–04	Catanzaro	Crotone
2004–05	Rimini	Avellino
2005–06	Napoli	Frosinone
2006–07	Ravenna	Avellino
2007–08	Salernitana	Ancona

== Lega Pro Prima Divisione (2008–14) ==
Group A

Season	Winner	Playoff Winner
2008–09	Cesena	Padova
2009–10	Novara	Varese
2010–11	Gubbio	Verona
2011–12	Ternana	Pro Vercelli
2012–13	Trapani	Carpi
2013–14	Virtus Entella	Pro Vercelli

Group B

Season	Winner	Playoff Winner
2008–09	Gallipoli	Crotone
2009–10	Portogruaro	Pescara
2010–11	Nocerina	Juve Stabia
2011–12	Spezia	Virtus Lanciano
2012–13	Avellino	Latina
2013–14	Perugia	Frosinone

== Serie C2 (1978–2008) ==
=== Seasons from 1978–79 to 1990–91 ===
Season	Group A Winner	Group B Winner	Group C Winner	Group D Winner
1978–79	Sanremese	Cremapergo	Fano	Rende
1979–80	Prato	Modena	Giulianova	Cosenza
1980–81	Rhodense	Padova	Casertana	Campania
1981–82	Carrarese	Ancona	Siena	Barletta
1982–83	Prato	Legnano	Francavilla	Messina
1983–84	Livorno	Pavia	Jesi	Reggina
1984–85	Siena	Virescit Boccaleone	Brindisi	Licata
1985–86	Lucchese	Centese	Teramo	Nocerina
1986–87	Torres	Ospitaletto	Vis Pesaro	Frosinone
1987–88	Carrarese	Mantova	Perugia	Palermo
1988–89	Casale	Chievo	Fidelis Andria	Puteolana
1989–90	Siena	Varese	Fano	Battipagliese
1990–91	Alessandria	Palazzolo	Chieti	Ischia

=== Seasons from 1991–92 to 2007–08 ===
Season	Group A Winner	Group B Winner	Group C Winner
1991–92	Ravenna	Vis Pesaro	Potenza
1992–93	Mantova	Pistoiese	Juve Stabia
1993–94	Crevalcore	Gualdo	Trapani
1994–95	Brescello	Montevarchi	Nocerina
1995–96	Novara	Treviso	Avezzano
1996–97	Lumezzane	Ternana	Battipagliese
1997–98	Varese	SPAL	Marsala
1998–99	Pisa	Viterbese	Catania
1999–2000	Spezia	Torres	Messina
2000–01	Padova	Lanciano	Taranto
2001–02	Prato	Teramo	Martina
2002–03	Pavia	Florentia Viola	Foggia
2003–04	Mantova	Grosseto	Frosinone
2004–05	Pro Sesto	Massese	Manfredonia
2005–06	Venezia	Cavese	Gallipoli
2006–07	Legnano	Foligno	Sorrento
2007–08	Pergocrema	Reggiana	Benevento

== Lega Pro Seconda Divisione (2008–14) ==
=== Seasons from 2008–09 to 2010–11 ===
Season	Group A Winner	Group A Playoff Winner	Group B Winner	Group B Playoff Winner	Group C Winner	Group C Playoff Winner
2008–09	Varese	Como	Figline	Giulianova	Cosenza	Pescina V.d.G.
2009–10	Südtirol	Spezia	Lucchese	Gubbio	Juve Stabia	Cisco Roma
2010–11	Tritium	FeralpiSalò	Carpi	Carrarese	Latina	Trapani

=== Seasons from 2011–12 to 2013–14 season ===
Season	Group A Winner	Group A Playoff Winner	Group B Winner	Group B Playoff Winner
2011–12	Treviso	Cuneo	Perugia	Paganese
2012–13	Pro Patria	Venezia	Salernitana	L'Aquila
2013–14	Bassano Virtus	Alessandria	Messina	Casertana

== Lega Pro (2014–2017) ==
Season	Group A Winner	Group B Winner	Group C Winner	Playoff Winner
2014–15	Novara	Teramo stripped of title due to match fixing, awarded to Ascoli	Salernitana	Como
2015–16	Cittadella	SPAL	Benevento	Pisa
2016–17	Cremonese	Venezia	Foggia	Parma

== Serie C (2017–) ==
Season	Group A Winner	Group B Winner	Group C Winner	Playoff Winner
2017–18	Livorno	Padova	Lecce	Cosenza
2018–19	Virtus Entella	Pordenone	Juve Stabia	Pisa, Trapani
2019–20	Monza	Vicenza	Reggina	Reggiana
2020–21	Como	Perugia	Ternana	Alessandria
2021–22	Südtirol	Modena	Bari	Palermo
2022–23	Feralpisalò	Reggiana	Catanzaro	Lecco
2023–24	Mantova	Cesena	Juve Stabia	Carrarese
2024–25	Padova	Virtus Entella	Avellino	Pescara
2025–26	Vicenza	Arezzo	Benevento	Ascoli
