= 1929–30 in Italian football =

Year in sports

Football in Italy
- Season: 1929–30

Men's football
- Serie A: Ambrosiana
- Serie B: Casale

The 1929–30 season was the 28th season of competitive football in Italy. This was the first season that the Italian Football Championship was revised from having regional and interregional rounds, to a single-tier round-robin format league.

== National team ==
=== Italy national football team ===
==== Friendlies ====
1 December 1929^{1} International friendly	Italy	6–1	Portugal	Milan, Italy
14:30 CET (UTC+01:00)	Mihalic 6', 88'; Orsi 36', 37'; Baloncieri 51'; Sallustro 77'	Report	Soares 29'	Stadium: San Siro; Attendance: 25,000; Referee: Louis Baert (Belgium)

9 February 1930 International friendly	Italy	4–2	Switzerland	Rome, Italy
14:30 CET (UTC+01:00)	Magnozzi 22'; Orsi 26'; Meazza 37', 39'	Report	Poretti 17', 19'	Stadium: Stadio Nazionale PNF; Attendance: 30,000; Referee: E. Gray (England)

2 March 1930 International friendly	Germany	0–2	Italy	Frankfurt, Germany
15:00 CET (UTC+01:00)		Report	Baloncieri 53'; Meazza 75'	Stadium: Waldstadion; Attendance: 45,000; Referee: Paul Ruoff (Switzerland)

6 April 1930 International friendly	Netherlands	1–1	Italy	Amsterdam, Netherlands
15:00 AT (UTC+00:20)	van den Broek 63'	Report	Baloncieri 24'	Stadium: Olympic Stadium; Attendance: 30,000; Referee: Peco Bauwens (Germany)

22 June 1930 International friendly	Italy	2–3	Spain	Bologna, Italy
16:00 CET (UTC+01:00)	Costantino 3', 40'	Report	Regueiro 30', 72'; Ventolrà 87'	Stadium: Stadio Littoriale; Attendance: 46,000; Referee: Raphaël van Praag (Belgium)

==== 1927–30 Central European International Cup ====
11 May 1930 1927–30 Central European International Cup	Hungary	0–5	Italy	Budapest, Hungary
16:00 CET (UTC+01:00)		Report	Meazza 17', 65', 70'; Magnozzi 72'; Costantino 84'	Stadium: Üllői úti stadion Attendance: 40,000; Referee: Peco Bauwens (Germany)

== League season ==
=== Serie A ===
Pos	Team	Pld	W	D	L	GF	GA	GD	Pts	Qualification or relegation
1	Ambrosiana (C)	34	22	6	6	85	38	+47	50	1930 Mitropa Cup
2	Genova 1893	34	20	8	6	60	36	+24	48	1930 Mitropa Cup
3	Juventus	34	19	7	8	56	31	+25	45	
4	Torino	34	16	7	11	52	31	+21	39	
5	Napoli	34	14	9	11	61	51	+10	37	
6	Roma	34	15	6	13	73	52	+21	36	
7	Bologna	34	14	8	12	56	46	+10	36	
8	Alessandria	34	14	8	12	55	49	+6	36	
9	Pro Vercelli	34	12	9	13	52	60	−8	33	
10	Brescia	34	13	7	14	45	56	−11	33	
11	Milan	34	11	10	13	52	48	+4	32	
12	Modena	34	11	8	15	48	55	−7	30	
13	Pro Patria	34	12	6	16	46	64	−18	30	
14	Livorno	34	12	5	17	51	79	−28	29	
15	Lazio	34	10	8	16	49	50	−1	28	
16	Triestina	34	11	6	17	52	78	−26	28	
17	Padova (R)	34	11	4	19	34	52	−18	26	1930–31 Serie B
18	Cremonese (R)	34	4	8	22	31	83	−52	16	1930–31 Serie B

Source: lega-calcio.it (in Italian)
Rules for classification: 1) points; 2) goal average
(C) Champions; (R) Relegated

=== Serie B ===
Pos	Team	Pld	W	D	L	GF	GA	GD	Pts	Promotion or relegation
1	Casale (P)	34	22	5	7	85	39	+46	49	1930–31 Serie A (Note: Casale and Legnano promoted for the 1930–31 Serie A season.)
2	Legnano (P)	34	19	8	7	56	31	+25	46	1930–31 Serie A
3	La Dominante (Note: La Dominante renamed A.C. Liguria at the end of the season.)	34	18	6	10	53	53	0	42	
4	Fiorentina	34	16	8	10	64	39	+25	40	
5	Pistoiese	34	17	6	11	46	36	+10	40	
6	Hellas Verona	34	17	5	12	48	47	+1	39	
7	Venezia	34	17	4	13	60	58	+2	38	
8	Atalanta	34	11	15	8	37	26	+11	37	
9	Bari	34	16	4	14	72	40	+32	36	
10	Novara	34	15	6	13	63	41	+22	36	
11	Monfalconese	34	16	3	15	57	44	+13	35	
12	Parma	34	12	8	14	38	27	+11	32	
13	Lecce	34	11	8	15	39	44	−5	30	
14	Spezia	34	12	6	16	36	54	−18	30	
15	Biellese (R)	34	11	3	20	34	58	−24	25	1930–31 Prima Divisione (Note: Biellese, Reggiana, Prato and Fiumana(-1) point deducted, relegated to the 1930–31 Prima Divisione.)
16	Reggiana (R)	34	8	7	19	45	75	−30	23	1930–31 Prima Divisione
17	Prato (R)	34	5	7	22	27	72	−45	17	1930–31 Prima Divisione
18	Fiumana (R)	34	6	5	23	26	72	−46	17	1930–31 Prima Divisione

Source: lega-calcio.it (in Italian)
Rules for classification: 1) points; 2) head-to-head points; 3) head-to-head goal difference; 4) head-to-head goals scored; 5) goal difference; 6) number of goals scored.
(P) Promoted; (R) Relegated

=== Prima Divisione ===
Group A (Northern)

P	Team	Pld	W	D	L	GF	GA	GD	Pts	Promotion or relegation
1.	Lucchese	24	13	4	7	39	31	+8	30	Promotion tie-breaker
2.	Rivarolese	24	14	2	8	45	30	+15	30	Promotion tie-breaker
3.	Savona	24	11	6	7	35	28	+7	28	
3.	Carrarese	24	11	6	7	38	29	+9	28	
5.	Viareggio	24	10	6	8	39	20	+19	26	
5.	Ventimigliese	24	9	8	7	32	28	+4	26	
7.	Acqui	24	9	7	8	32	26	+6	25	
8.	Sestrese	24	11	2	11	32	39	-7	24	
9.	Pro Lissone	24	9	5	10	38	37	+1	23	
9.	Empoli	24	9	4	11	30	43	-13	22	
11.	Pisa	24	5	9	10	26	39	-13	19	
12.	Rapallo Ruentes	24	7	4	13	30	43	-13	18	
13.	Sestri Levante	24	5	3	16	26	49	-23	12	
n.c.	Astigiani	-	-	-	-	-	-	-	-	Retired
n.c.	Corniglianese	-	-	-	-	-	-	-	-	Retired

	Promotion tie-breaker		City and date
Lucchese	1–0	Rivarolese	La Spezia, 15 June 1930

Group B (Northern)

P	Team	Pld	W	D	L	GF	GA	GD	Pts	Promotion or relegation
1.	Derthona	28	17	6	5	76	34	+42	40	Promoted to Serie B
2.	Comense	28	15	8	5	44	20	+24	38	
3.	Canottieri Lecco	28	13	6	9	49	40	+9	32	
4.	Monza	28	11	9	8	39	35	+4	31	
4.	Fanfulla	28	14	3	11	45	34	+11	31	
6.	Gallaratese	28	12	6	10	45	44	+1	30	
7.	Piacenza	28	10	7	11	53	43	+10	27	
7.	Vogherese	28	11	5	12	53	45	+8	27	
7.	Crema	28	11	5	12	52	58	-6	27	
7.	Varese	28	10	7	11	30	35	-5	27	
11.	Pavia	28	8	10	10	45	54	-9	26	
12.	Seregno	28	8	9	11	37	46	-9	25	
13.	Vigevanesi	28	10	4	14	40	48	-8	24	
14.	Codogno	28	7	9	12	31	53	-22	23	Later readmitted
15.	Saronno	28	3	6	19	18	68	-50	12	Later readmitted

Group C (Northern)

P	Team	Pld	W	D	L	GF	GA	GD	Pts	Promotion or relegation
1.	Udinese	28	18	6	4	63	28	+35	42	Promoted to Serie B
2.	SPAL	28	17	5	6	81	38	+43	39	
3.	ASPE Trieste	28	14	8	6	47	29	+18	36	
4.	Pro Gorizia	28	14	7	7	52	28	+24	35	
5.	Mirandolese	28	12	7	9	40	36	+4	31	
5.	Treviso	28	11	9	8	49	49	0	31	
7.	Clarense	28	12	6	10	49	42	+7	30	
7.	Anconitana	28	10	10	8	39	34	+5	30	
9.	Forlì	28	11	4	13	45	43	+2	26	
10.	Mantova	28	8	9	11	42	56	-14	25	
11.	Thiene	28	8	5	15	48	58	-10	21	
11.	Faenza	28	7	7	14	30	50	-20	21	
11.	Carpi	28	6	9	13	31	54	-23	21	
14.	Grion Pola	28	7	6	15	30	49	-19	20	Later readmitted
15.	Pro Rovigo	28	5	2	21	30	82	-52	12	Later readmitted

Southern

P	Team	Pld	W	D	L	GF	GA	GD	Pts	Promotion or relegation
1.	Palermo	28	20	2	6	59	17	+42	42	Promoted to Serie B
2.	Messina	28	14	7	7	57	34	+23	35	
2.	Nocerina	28	15	5	8	46	38	+8	35	Relegated to Seconda Divisione for money problems
2.	Foggia	28	13	9	6	48	32	+16	35	
5.	Cagliari	28	14	6	8	47	23	+24	34	
6.	Siracusa	28	15	2	11	46	40	+6	32	
7.	Salernitana	28	13	4	11	52	49	+3	30	
8.	Maceratese	28	13	3	12	47	43	+4	29	
9.	Ternana	28	12	3	13	32	46	-14	27	
9.	Taranto	28	10	7	11	64	44	+20	27	
11.	Virtus Lanciano	28	9	8	11	38	51	-13	24	Retired
12.	Vomero Napoli	28	7	9	12	35	49	-14	23	
13.	Stabia	28	8	2	18	28	59	-31	18	Relegated to Seconda Divisione for money problems
14.	Acquavivese	28	4	5	19	21	58	-37	13	Relegated to Seconda Divisione for money problems
15.	Foligno	28	4	6	17	23	60	-37	12	Later readmitted

National final

	Semi-finals		City and date
Palermo	2–1	Lucchese	Naples, 6 July 1930
Udinese	2–0	Derthona	forfait

	Final		City and date
Udinese	3–1	Palermo	Rome, 13 July 1930

Udinese is crowned national champion of Prima Divisione.
