= 1929–30 Prima Divisione =

Prima Divisione
- Season: 1929–30
- Champions: Udinese
- Promoted: Lucchese; Derthona; US Palermo
- Relegated: solely disbanded clubs
- Matches played: 1,680

The 1929–30 Prima Divisione was the third level league of the 30th Italian football championship.

In 1928, FIGC had decided a reform of the league structure of Italian football. The top-level league was the National Division, composed by the two divisions of Serie A and Serie B. Under them, there were the local championship, the major one being the First Division, that in 1935 will take the name of Serie C. The winners of the four groups of First Division would be promoted to Serie B, whereas the scheduled relegations were annulled by the Federation which expanded the division.

== Teams ==
Club selection was different between the two parts of the country. The North admitted 37 out of the 43 clubs of the previous year, solely without promoted and disbanded teams, and 7 promoted club from the Second Division plus Pro Lissone as last-minute team. The South chose 14 best clubs from the five regions of the special Southern Championship, plus Foligno as guest.

== Regulation ==
Four groups of 15 teams, thirty matchdays. Group winners were promoted, ultimate and penultimate clubs should be relegated. A national title was assigned.

== Northern division ==
=== Girone A ===
Final classification

Pos	Team	Pld	W	D	L	GF	GA	GD	Pts	Promotion or relegation
1	Lucchese (P)	24	13	4	7	39	31	+8	30	Promoted to Serie B
2	Rivarolese	24	14	2	8	45	30	+15	30	Promotion tie-breaker
3	Savona	24	11	6	7	35	28	+7	28	
3	Carrarese	24	11	6	7	38	29	+9	28	
5	Viareggio	24	10	6	8	39	20	+19	26	
5	Ventimigliese	24	9	8	7	32	28	+4	26	
7	Acqui	24	9	7	8	32	26	+6	25	
8	Sestrese	24	11	2	11	32	39	−7	24	
9	Pro Lissone	24	9	5	10	38	37	+1	23	
9	Empoli	24	9	4	11	30	43	−13	22	
11	Pisa	24	5	9	10	26	39	−13	19	
12	Rapallo Ruentes	24	7	4	13	30	43	−13	18	
13	Sestri Levante	24	5	3	16	26	49	−23	12 (Note: 1 point deducted)	
14	Astigiani (E)	0	0	0	0	0	0	0	0 (Note: Not classified because Astigiani got retired (final forfeit) before match 27th)	Retired
15	Corniglianese (E)	0	0	0	0	0	0	0	0 (Note: Not classified because S.S. Corniglianese got retired (final forfeit) after 16 matches)	Retired

Source: Panini
(E) Eliminated; (P) Promoted
Notes:

	Promotion tie-breaker		City and date
Lucchese	1 - 0	Rivarolese	La Spezia, June 15, 1930

Lucchese was promoted to 1930–31 Serie B.
Final table was compiled by Direttorio Divisioni Superiori (D.D.S.) just by points and published by the sports newspaper Il Littoriale on Saturday June 14 page 6 in report no. 40 dated June 11 just indicating: Corniglianese and Astigiani retired.

Results

Home \ Away	ACQ	AST	CAR	COR	EMP	LUC	PIS	PLI	RAP	RIV	SVN	SES	SLE	Ven	VIA
Acqui		2–0	2–1	5–0	6–0	1–2	1–0	1–0	3–2	1–0	1–0	2–0	1–1	2–0	1–1
Astigiani (Note: Astigiani got retired after 26 matches.)	3–1		0–1	4–0	0–2	.–.	4–2	0–1	4–0	1–0	1–2	.–.	1–0	0–2	2–3
Carrarese	1–1	2–0		2–0	2–0	5–0	2–1	1–1	4–0	2–1	2–0	2–0	2–1	4–1	2–1
Corniglianese (Note: Corniglianese got retired after 16 matches.)	.–.	.–.	.–.		0–1	.–.	0–2	1–0	.–.	.–.	1–3	.–.	1–2	0–2	0–2
Empoli	2–1	2–1	1–0	.–.		2–0	1–2	0–0	1–0	6–1	2–2	3–2	1–0	1–1	2–1
Lucchese	1–0	2–1	3–0	.–.	0–0		2–0	3–3	2–1	2–1	3–0	2–0	3–0	2–1	1–0
Pisa	3–3	1–1	1–1	.–.	2–1	0–0		2–0	4–4	2–2	1–1	2–0	3–2	0–0	0–0
Pro Lissone	1–1	3–1	4–2	.–.	2–0	1–0	3–0		2–0	1–3	5–1	1–1	4–3	4–0	2–2
Rapallo Ruentes	1–0	1–1	0–0	3–0	2–0	1–3	0–0	3–0		5–2	0–0	1–2	2–1	3–1	2–1
Rivarolese	1–0	4–0	4–0	3–0	2–0	5–2	1–0	4–1	3–0		0–1	1–0	3–0	3–1	2–1
Savona	4–1	6–0	2–1	.–.	1–0	1–1	2–0	4–1	3–1	1–1		1–0	2–0	2–3	2–0
Sestrese	1–0	.–.	0–0	3–0	2–3	3–1	2–0	1–0	4–1	1–2	3–2		4–3	1–0	2–1
Sestri Levante	0–2	0–0	3–2	.–.	4–1	2–0	2–1	0–2	1–0	0–2	1–3	3–0		0–0	0–3
Ventimiglia	2–0	4–2	1–1	.–.	3–1	1–1	4–1	1–0	2–0	1–0	0–0	3–1	3–1		0–0
Viareggio	1–1	3–0	2–0	3–1	2–1	3–0	4–1	1–0	4–0	0–1	2–1	5–0	4–0	0–0	

Updated to match(es) played on unknown. Source: Annogol 1929-30, Geo Edizioni, Empoli, June 2003 (in Italian)
Legend: Blue = home team win; Yellow = draw; Red = away team win.

=== Girone B ===
Final classification

Pos	Team	Pld	W	D	L	GF	GA	GD	Pts	Promotion or relegation
1	Derthona (P)	28	17	6	5	76	34	+42	40	Promoted to Serie B
2	Comense	28	15	8	5	44	20	+24	38	
3	Canottieri Lecco	28	13	6	9	49	40	+9	32	
4	Monza	28	11	9	8	39	35	+4	31	
4	Fanfulla	28	14	3	11	45	34	+11	31	
6	Gallaratese	28	12	6	10	45	44	+1	30	
7	Piacenza	28	10	7	11	53	43	+10	27	
7	Vogherese	28	11	5	12	53	45	+8	27	
7	Crema	28	11	5	12	52	58	−6	27	
7	Varese	28	10	7	11	30	35	−5	27	
11	Pavia	28	8	10	10	45	54	−9	26	
12	Seregno	28	8	9	11	37	46	−9	25	
13	Vigevanesi	28	10	4	14	40	48	−8	24	
14	Codogno (T)	28	7	9	12	31	53	−22	23	Later readmitted (Note: Relegated and later readmitted to Prima Divisione.)
15	Saronno (T)	28	3	6	19	18	68	−50	12	Later readmitted

Source: Panini
(P) Promoted; (T) Qualified, but not yet for the particular phase indicated
Notes:

Results

Home \ Away	CAL	COD	COM	CRM	DER	FAN	GLR	MON	PAV	PIA	SAR	SER	VAR	VIG	VOG
Canottieri Lecco		3–0	2–2	3–2	2–2	1–0	1–0	1–1	3–3	1–0	9–0	2–1	3–0	4–2	2–1
Codogno	2–1		0–1	2–0	2–0	1–0	3–3	1–1	0–0	0–0	5–1	1–1	0–0	1–0	1–0
Comense	3–0	2–0		2–1	1–1	2–0	2–0	1–2	0–0	1–0	5–0	0–0	4–0	4–0	0–0
Crema	2–0	2–1	2–1		6–3	2–0	2–0	5–1	3–1	3–3	2–1	0–1	0–0	6–1	3–3
Derthona	4–0	5–1	4–0	7–1		0–1	2–0	2–2	5–1	6–0	3–0	8–0	3–0	3–1	4–2
Fanfulla	3–0	4–1	0–1	2–0	1–0		4–0	1–0	4–2	2–1	2–1	3–1	5–1	2–0	1–0
Gallaratese	1–0	4–3	1–1	1–0	6–1	1–1		1–0	2–2	2–2	1–0	2–1	3–1	4–1	1–2
Monza	1–2	1–1	1–2	4–1	0–0	5–3	2–1		4–1	3–0	3–0	0–0	1–0	2–1	3–2
Pavia	0–4	2–2	1–3	1–0	2–3	2–1	1–2	0–0		5–1	4–1	3–0	2–2	4–2	2–1
Piacenza	5–2	4–0	0–0	6–0	3–2	6–0	5–2	1–2	3–1		2–0	3–0	0–0	2–2	4–1
Saronno	1–0	1–1	0–1	1–1	1–1	2–0	0–0	0–0	1–1	0–2		1–4	1–2	2–2	3–2
Seregno	1–1	1–1	0–2	5–3	2–1	1–1	0–1	2–0	1–1	1–0	4–3		2–2	3–1	1–1
Varese	3–2	4–1	2–1	4–0	0–1	1–0	3–1	2–0	0–0	0–0	2–0	2–1		0–1	1–0
Vigevanesi	2–0	5–0	0–0	3–1	0–2	0–0	3–2	0–0	4–1	3–1	3–0	0–2	1–0		1–2
Vogherese	1–1	6–1	3–2	2–3	2–2	2–1	1–3	4–0	1–2	3–0	4–0	2–1	3–1	2–1	

Updated to match(es) played on unknown. Source: Annogol 1929-30, Geo Edizioni, Empoli, June 2003 (in Italian)
Legend: Blue = home team win; Yellow = draw; Red = away team win.

=== Girone C ===
Final classification

Pos	Team	Pld	W	D	L	GF	GA	GD	Pts	Promotion or relegation
1	Udinese (P, C)	28	18	6	4	63	28	+35	42	Promoted to Serie B
2	SPAL	28	17	5	6	81	38	+43	39	
3	ASPE Trieste	28	14	8	6	47	29	+18	36	
4	Pro Gorizia	28	14	7	7	52	28	+24	35	
5	Mirandolese	28	12	7	9	40	36	+4	31	
5	Treviso	28	11	9	8	49	49	0	31	
7	Clarense	28	12	6	10	49	42	+7	30	
7	Anconitana	28	10	10	8	39	34	+5	30	
9	Forlì	28	11	4	13	45	43	+2	26	
10	Mantova	28	8	9	11	42	56	−14	25	
11	Thiene	28	8	5	15	48	58	−10	21	
11	Faenza	28	7	7	14	30	50	−20	21	
11	Carpi	28	6	9	13	31	54	−23	21	
14	Grion Pola (T)	28	7	6	15	30	49	−19	20	Later readmitted (Note: Relegated to Seconda Divisione and later readmitted to Prima Divisione.)
15	Pro Rovigo (T)	28	5	2	21	30	82	−52	11 (Note: 1 point deducted)	Later readmitted

Source: Panini
(C) Champions; (P) Promoted; (T) Qualified, but not yet for the particular phase indicated
Notes:

Results

Home \ Away	ANC	PON	CRP	CLA	FAE	FOR	GRP	MAN	MIR	PGO	PRV	SPA	THI	TRV	UDI
Anconitana		0–0	0–0	1–2	2–0	3–3	1–1	3–1	2–0	2–2	2–0	1–0	4–0	2–1	3–1
Ponziana	2–1		2–1	3–1	4–1	0–0	2–0	0–1	2–1	2–1	7–0	2–2	0–0	3–0	0–1
Carpi	1–1	0–0		1–0	1–0	1–1	3–2	2–2	1–0	0–2	0–3	1–0	3–2	1–2	0–0
Clarense	3–1	1–2	3–0		2–2	2–1	5–2	1–1	0–0	1–0	2–1	2–5	2–1	1–1	2–0
Faenza	0–0	3–0	1–1	0–3		1–1	3–0	1–1	1–2	1–2	2–0	0–3	2–1	4–2	1–1
Forlì	1–0	1–2	4–1	2–1	1–0		3–1	3–1	2–1	2–1	0–1	0–0	3–0	2–0	0–1
Grion Pola	1–1	2–4	3–1	1–0	3–2	2–0		1–0	0–2	1–0	1–1	0–4	4–1	1–2	0–1
Mantova	2–1	1–1	2–2	1–1	0–0	1–2	0–0		0–2	2–1	5–1	1–3	2–1	4–1	1–7
Mirandolese	2–1	0–0	1–1	1–0	2–0	2–1	0–0	4–1		1–1	2–0	6–2	6–2	1–1	1–2
Pro Gorizia	0–0	2–3	3–1	3–2	7–0	4–1	3–0	5–0	0–0		4–2	2–0	1–0	0–0	0–1
Pro Rovigo	1–2	2–1	4–2	0–3	0–2	3–1	2–1	0–2	0–1	0–2		1–4	0–4	2–2	2–3
SPAL	2–2	3–1	5–2	1–1	5–0	3–1	3–0	7–1	2–1	4–1	3–0		4–1	6–1	4–2
Thiene	2–2	1–2	4–1	3–2	1–0	3–1	4–3	1–3	0–0	0–1	5–2	3–2		1–2	0–0
Treviso	3–1	2–1	2–1	5–2	1–1	3–2	0–0	3–2	9–0	1–1	2–1	2–2	1–1		0–4
Udinese	4–0	1–1	5–1	2–2	2–3	4–1	1–0	3–2	3–1	0–0	7–1	3–1	3–1	1–0	

Updated to match(es) played on unknown. Source: Annogol 1929-30, Geo Edizioni, Empoli, June 2003 (in Italian)
Legend: Blue = home team win; Yellow = draw; Red = away team win.

== Southern division ==
Final classification

Pos	Team	Pld	W	D	L	GF	GA	GD	Pts	Promotion or relegation
1	Palermo (P)	28	20	2	6	59	17	+42	42	Promoted to Serie B
2	Messina	28	14	7	7	57	34	+23	35	
2	Nocerina (D, R)	28	15	5	8	46	38	+8	35	Relegated for money problems
2	Foggia	28	13	9	6	48	32	+16	35	
5	Cagliari	28	14	6	8	47	23	+24	34	
6	Siracusa	28	15	2	11	46	40	+6	32	
7	Salernitana	28	13	4	11	52	49	+3	30	
8	Maceratese	28	13	3	12	47	43	+4	29	
9	Ternana	28	12	3	13	32	46	−14	27	
9	Taranto	28	10	7	11	64	44	+20	27	
11	Virtus Lanciano (E)	28	9	8	11	38	51	−13	25 (Note: 1 point deducted)	Disbanded
12	Vomero Napoli	28	7	9	12	35	49	−14	23	
13	Stabia (D, R)	28	8	2	18	28	59	−31	18	Relegated for money problems
14	Acquavivese (D, R)	28	4	5	19	21	58	−37	13	Relegated for money problems
15	Foligno (T)	27	4	6	17	23	60	−37	13	Later readmitted (Note: Relegated and later readmitted to Prima Divisione.)

Source: Panini
(D) Disqualified; (E) Eliminated; (P) Promoted; (R) Relegated; (T) Qualified, but not yet for the particular phase indicated
Notes:

Results

Home \ Away	ACQ	CAG	FOG	FOL	MAC	MES	NOC	PAL	SAL	SIR	STA	TAR	TER	VLN	VOM
Acquavivese		1–2	1–1	0–0	2–1	1–4	0–2	0–3	0–0	2–3	4–0	0–0	0–3	0–0	3–1
Cagliari	5–0		0–1	3–0	4–1	2–0	1–1	2–1	3–0	3–0	2–1	0–0	2–1	5–0	3–0
Foggia	4–0	1–0		4–0	2–2	5–0	1–1	2–1	3–1	2–1	3–0	2–2	2–1	1–1	0–0
Foligno	3–0	0–2	1–1		0–2	0–1	1–2	0–2	2–1	0–2	2–0	2–1	0–1	1–1	0–0
Maceratese	2–1	0–0	3–2	2–1		2–1	3–0	1–0	4–0	4–0	2–0	0–1	0–1	4–2	4–0
Messina	2–1	1–1	1–0	3–1	2–2		2–0	0–1	7–1	2–0	2–1	2–1	9–0	3–3	6–2
Nocerina	2–1	2–1	1–1	6–1	3–0	1–1		0–1	2–1	1–0	2–1	4–2	2–0	3–2	1–1
Palermo	2–0	1–0	4–0	2–2	4–1	1–0	5–0		2–0	4–1	4–0	2–0	3–0	1–2	1–1
Salernitana	4–0	0–0	3–2	3–2	2–0	1–1	2–3	2–1		3–2	7–0	4–1	3–1	2–2	3–1
Siracusa	1–0	2–2	1–0	3–1	3–1	1–0	3–2	0–1	1–0		2–1	3–2	1–0	5–1	4–0
Stabia	3–2	1–2	0–1	5–1	1–0	1–0	1–0	0–4	1–3	1–3		2–1	3–1	1–1	1–0
Taranto	1–0	3–0	4–0	9–0	4–1	2–2	0–1	1–3	4–1	2–2	4–3		6–1	6–0	4–2
Ternana	2–0	1–0	0–2	3–1	3–1	3–0	1–3	2–0	3–1	1–0	1–0	2–1		2–0	1–1
Virtus Lanciano	2–0	2–1	1–1	0–0	2–1	0–1	4–0	0–2	1–2	2–1	1–1	4–2	2–0		0–2
Vomero Napoli	6–1	2–1	1–2	2–1	3–2	2–2	1–0	0–2	0–2	1–2	3–0	1–1	1–1	1–1	

Updated to match(es) played on unknown. Source: Annogol 1929-30, Geo Edizioni, Empoli, June 2003 (in Italian)
Legend: Blue = home team win; Yellow = draw; Red = away team win.

== National final ==
	Semi-finals		City and date
Palermo	2 - 1	Lucchese	Naples, July 6, 1930
Udinese	2 - 0	Derthona	forfait

	Final		City and date
Udinese	3 - 1	Palermo	Rome, July 13, 1930

Udinese is crowned national champion of Prima Divisione.
