= 1930–31 Prima Divisione =

Prima Divisione
- Season: 1930–31
- Promoted: Como; Vigevano Calcio; US Cagliari
- Relegated: solely disbanded clubs

The 1930–31 Prima Divisione was the third-level league of the 31st Italian football championship.

In 1928, FIGC had decided a reform of the league structure of Italian football. The top-level league was the National Division, composed by the two divisions of Serie A and Serie B. Under them, there were the local championship, the major one being the First Division, that in 1935 will take the name of Serie C. Starting from this season, the winners of the six groups of First Division would be admitted to the final rounds, where three tickets of promotion to Serie B were available, whereas the scheduled relegations were annulled by the Federation which expanded the division.

== Teams ==
The Northern section rose from 45 to 56 clubs including twelve teams from the disbanded lower inter-regional Authority. The Southern section rose from 15 to 24 clubs including quite all the provincial capitals under FIGC decision.

== Regulation ==
Four groups of 14 teams in the Northern section with two little final groups, thirty-two matchdays. Final group winners were promoted, ultimate and penultimate clubs in the regular season should be relegated.

Two groups of 12 teams in the Southern section with a Southern final.

== Northern division ==
Qualified (for regular season's groups)
Promoted (for final rounds)
Relegated

=== Girone A ===
Final classification

Pos	Team	Pld	W	D	L	GF	GA	GD	Pts	Qualification or relegation
1	SPAL	26	18	4	4	70	32	+38	40	Qualified
2	Pro Gorizia	26	13	10	3	47	17	+30	36	Qualified
3	Vicenza	26	13	9	4	47	32	+15	35	
4	Treviso	26	11	10	5	46	29	+17	32	
5	Thiene	26	11	5	10	54	44	+10	27	
5	Mantova	26	11	5	10	38	42	−4	27	
7	Esperia Trieste (Note: At the end of the season merges with Ponzianini F.C. Trieste, giving rise to the S.S. Ponziana of Trieste.)	26	9	8	9	40	31	+9	26	
8	Grion Pola	26	10	5	11	49	46	+3	25	
9	Finale Emilia (E)	26	9	6	11	41	43	−2	24	Disbanded (Note: Bankruptcy)
10	Fiumana	26	8	6	12	35	36	−1	22	
11	Mirandolese	26	8	4	14	42	52	−10	20	
12	Dolo	26	8	3	15	43	64	−21	18 (Note: 1 point deducted.)	
12	Rovigo	26	8	2	16	37	67	−30	18	
14	Carpi (T)	26	3	7	16	24	66	−42	12 (Note: 1 point deducted?)	

Source: Panini
(E) Eliminated; (T) Qualified, but not yet for the particular phase indicated
Notes:

Results

Home \ Away	CRP	DOL	ESP	FIN	FIU	GRP	MAN	MIR	PGO	ROV	SPA	THI	TRV	VIC
Carpi		3–0	0–3	1–1	1–0	1–6	1–0	1–1	0–2	1–2	1–3	0–0	2–2	2–2
Dolo	5–0		2–0	0–0	0–2	1–2	2–1	3–1	2–2	3–1	2–5	4–2	1–1	2–1
Esperia Trieste	4–0	2–3		1–2	1–1	3–3	2–0	5–0	2–1	3–0	2–1	2–0	0–2	2–2
Finale Emilia	3–1	7–2	3–4		2–1	2–0	2–0	5–3	0–1	2–0	3–4	2–1	1–2	1–0
Fiumana	3–1	2–1	0–0	0–0		5–1	1–1	1–0	0–1	4–0	1–0	2–1	0–0	0–1
Grion Pola	2–0	3–0	1–0	2–0	7–1		6–0	3–0	1–1	0–0	2–3	0–1	3–3	1–3
Mantova	3–0	3–1	1–0	2–0	1–0	4–0		3–0	1–4	2–1	2–2	3–3	1–0	2–1
Mirandolese	2–0	5–0	0–0	1–1	2–0	5–1	1–2		0–0	5–1	2–3	2–0	3–4	1–3
Pro Gorizia	4–0	6–1	1–1	1–0	1–0	0–2	1–1	5–0		2–0	1–1	3–1	0–0	2–2
Rovigo	3–2	4–3	0–1	4–2	4–2	2–1	4–4	0–4	2–6		1–2	2–1	0–1	1–4
SPAL	1–1	7–3	2–0	4–0	3–1	1–0	2–0	0–2	3–1	3–1		3–0	2–0	0–1
Thiene	4–3	9–1	1–0	4–0	1–1	6–0	3–1	3–0	1–2	3–1	2–1		3–0	1–1
Treviso	9–1	4–1	1–1	4–2	2–0	2–2	1–0	1–0	0–0	4–1	1–2	1–1		0–0
Vicenza	1–1	1–0	1–1	2–1	4–2	2–0	3–0	5–0	0–0	1–0	2–2	2–0	2–1	

Updated to match(es) played on unknown. Source: Almanacco Illustrato del Calcio - La Storia 1898-2004, Panini Edizioni, Modena, September 2005 (in Italian)
Legend: Blue = home team win; Yellow = draw; Red = away team win.

=== Girone B ===
Final classification

Pos	Team	Pld	W	D	L	GF	GA	GD	Pts	Qualification or relegation
1	Forlì	26	15	6	5	68	35	+33	36	Qualified
2	Reggiana	26	16	3	7	59	30	+29	35	Qualified
3	Piacenza	26	16	2	8	53	26	+27	34	
4	Viareggio	26	14	6	6	37	23	+14	34	
5	Dop. Portuale Livorno (Note: At the end of the season merges with U.S. Livorno.) (E)	26	14	6	6	46	31	+15	34	Merged
6	Anconitana	26	13	3	10	37	27	+10	29	
7	Pisa	26	11	6	9	44	36	+8	28	
8	Ravenna	26	11	4	11	34	37	−3	26	
9	Carrarese P.Binelli	26	7	7	12	29	43	−14	21	
9	Prato	26	9	3	14	33	51	−18	21	
11	Fiorenzuola	26	8	4	14	38	44	−6	20	
12	Empoli	26	6	6	14	25	41	−16	18	
12	Faenza	26	6	6	14	26	65	−39	18	
14	Littorio Firenze (T)	26	4	2	20	22	60	−38	9 (Note: 1 point deducted.)	

Source: Panini
(E) Eliminated; (T) Qualified, but not yet for the particular phase indicated
Notes:

Results

Home \ Away	ANC	CAR	DPO	EMP	FAE	FRN	FOR	Lit	PIA	PIS	PRA	RAV	REA	VIA
Anconitana		2–0	1–2	2–1	5–0	2–0	1–1	2–0	1–0	3–2	5–0	2–0	2–1	1–0
Carrarese	1–0		0–2	2–1	5–0	1–1	1–1	2–0	3–1	2–2	0–2	5–0	1–0	0–0
Dop. Portuale	2–0	3–1		4–1	5–1	1–0	4–2	0–3	1–1	2–1	2–1	3–0	2–2	3–1
Empoli	1–1	1–1	2–2		1–0	3–1	2–1	1–1	1–0	2–2	3–0	0–1	0–2	0–1
Faenza	1–1	1–1	1–1	1–0		3–2	2–3	2–2	0–2	3–1	3–2	1–1	1–2	2–0
Fiorenzuola	3–1	2–0	0–1	3–0	5–0		2–2	1–0	0–1	0–1	3–1	3–1	0–1	1–1
Forlì	3–2	3–1	5–0	3–0	0–0	3–2		3–0	2–1	5–0	6–1	1–2	2–1	8–0
Littorio Firenze	0–2	1–0	0–2	1–2	2–3	2–3	0–5		4–2	1–4	2–6	1–0	0–3	1–0
Piacenza	0–1	3–0	1–0	3–0	8–0	2–1	3–2	6–0		1–0	2–1	4–1	5–0	3–0
Pisa	1–0	2–0	0–0	2–0	5–0	3–1	1–1	2–0	4–1		4–0	2–2	3–0	0–0
Prato	1–0	4–0	2–1	1–1	1–0	4–1	1–4	2–1	0–1	2–0		1–2	3–3	1–1
Ravenna	2–1	2–2	0–0	1–0	2–0	6–2	1–4	2–0	0–1	4–0	3–0		1–0	1–2
Reggiana	2–0	7–0	2–1	4–3	4–0	3–1	5–1	5–2	1–1	4–0	1–0	3–0		2–0
Viareggio	2–0	2–0	4–0	1–0	4–0	1–1	1–1	3–0	3–0	2–1	4–0	1–0	2–0	

Updated to match(es) played on unknown. Source: Almanacco Illustrato del Calcio - La Storia 1898-2004, Panini Edizioni, Modena, September 2005 (in Italian)
Legend: Blue = home team win; Yellow = draw; Red = away team win.

=== Girone C ===
Final classification

Pos	Team	Pld	W	D	L	GF	GA	GD	Pts	Qualification or relegation
1	Comense	26	18	8	0	71	20	+51	44	Qualified
2	Seregno	26	15	5	6	45	24	+21	35	Qualified
3	Pro Lissone	26	15	3	8	37	35	+2	33	
4	Gallaratese	26	13	5	8	37	33	+4	31	
5	Isotta Fraschini (E)	26	12	6	8	39	29	+10	30	Disbanded
6	Biellese	26	10	6	10	36	31	+5	26	
7	Canottieri Lecco	26	9	7	10	38	34	+4	25	
7	Monza	26	10	5	11	35	39	−4	25	
9	Fanfulla	26	9	5	12	50	58	−8	23	
10	Saronno	26	9	4	13	35	44	−9	22	
11	Crema	26	9	3	14	37	49	−12	21	
12	Varese	26	7	6	13	26	36	−10	20	
13	Clarense	26	3	10	13	22	49	−27	16	
14	Desio (E)	26	4	5	17	20	46	−26	13	Disbanded (Note: Renounced to play to the following season.)

Source: Panini
(E) Eliminated
Notes:

Results

Home \ Away	BIE	CAL	CLA	COM	CRM	DES	FAN	GLR	ISO	MON	PLI	SAR	SER	VAR
Biellese		2–1	2–2	1–1	0–2	1–0	3–0	2–0	0–2	2–0	4–1	4–1	0–1	4–1
Canottieri Lecco	0–6		1–1	1–1	3–1	3–0	3–1	2–0	2–2	2–1	4–0	2–2	0–1	1–0
Clarense	0–4	1–1		1–0	2–2	0–0	2–0	1–2	1–2	1–3	0–1	0–2	0–0	1–0
Comense	3–1	3–0	6–2		6–0	6–2	4–0	4–1	1–1	3–1	4–1	1–0	4–2	2–1
Crema	1–0	2–0	3–1	1–1		0–2	3–4	1–4	3–0	3–1	2–1	1–0	0–2	3–1
Desio	0–0	1–1	0–0	1–3	3–3		3–1	1–2	1–0	0–2	1–2	2–0	1–3	1–0
Fanfulla	0–0	2–0	5–2	1–1	5–0	2–1		1–1	2–1	5–1	3–0	4–4	1–3	3–0
Gallaratese	1–0	2–0	1–0	0–3	2–1	4–0	3–0		2–3	1–1	0–0	3–2	1–1	1–0
Isotta Fraschini	0–0	3–0	2–0	0–2	1–0	3–0	5–2	1–1		1–0	3–1	1–2	1–0	0–0
Monza	0–0	1–3	1–1	2–5	3–1	2–1	4–3	3–0	2–1		0–2	1–0	2–0	2–0
Pro Lissone	2–1	1–0	1–1	0–0	1–0	1–0	3–2	0–1	1–2	3–1		2–1	2–1	3–0
Saronno	1–5	2–0	2–0	3–4	3–1	2–0	3–0	2–0	1–2	3–0	2–1		2–0	1–1
Seregno	2–0	3–0	2–0	0–0	2–1	1–0	5–0	3–0	2–1	1–1	3–5	2–1		4–0
Varese	3–0	2–0	2–0	0–2	2–1	3–0	4–0	1–3	2–2	1–2	0–2	1–1	1–1	

Updated to match(es) played on unknown. Source: Almanacco Illustrato del Calcio - La Storia 1898-2004, Panini Edizioni, Modena, September 2005 (in Italian)
Legend: Blue = home team win; Yellow = draw; Red = away team win.

=== Girone D ===
Final classification

Pos	Team	Pld	W	D	L	GF	GA	GD	Pts	Qualification or relegation
1	Vigevanesi	24	16	5	3	68	19	+49	37	Qualified
2	Pavia (Note: Qualified after tie-breaker: Pavia-Vogherese 3-2)	24	14	3	7	49	25	+24	31	Qualified
3	Vogherese	24	14	3	7	49	27	+22	31	
4	Savona	24	12	4	8	41	33	+8	28	
5	Braidese (D, R)	24	9	7	8	29	37	−8	25	Relegated for waiver
5	Rivarolese	24	10	5	9	30	32	−2	25	
7	Ventimigliese	24	10	3	11	42	33	+9	23	
8	Acqui	24	9	4	11	35	42	−7	22	
9	Sestrese	24	9	3	12	41	42	−1	21	
10	Imperia	24	7	6	11	30	56	−26	20	
11	Rapallo Ruentes	24	6	7	11	25	42	−17	19	
12	Abbiategrasso	24	6	4	14	28	54	−26	16	
13	Codogno	24	5	4	15	24	49	−25	14	
14	Sestri Levante (D, R)	0	0	0	0	0	0	0	0	Retired

Source: Panini
(D) Disqualified; (R) Relegated
Notes:

Results

Home \ Away	ABB	ACQ	BRA	COD	IMP	PAV	RAP	RIV	SVN	SES	Ven	VIG	VOG
Abbiategrasso		1–1	3–1	1–1	1–2	2–1	3–1	2–0	2–3	3–1	1–1	0–3	3–1
Acqui	4–1		1–1	2–0	5–0	2–3	2–0	2–0	0–2	2–1	1–0	1–7	1–2
Bra	2–1	3–0		2–1	1–1	1–2	0–0	0–2	1–0	5–2	1–0	1–1	1–0
Codogno	0–0	0–0	1–2		5–0	0–0	3–0	1–3	2–1	2–0	2–0	2–4	0–3
Imperia	0–0	3–2	1–3	3–1		2–0	5–0	2–2	1–1	2–0	1–3	1–1	0–4
Pavia	1–0	3–1	1–0	6–0	4–0		3–0	5–0	2–0	2–0	3–1	1–3	2–0
Rapallo Ruentes	3–1	4–0	4–1	2–2	0–0	1–5		0–0	1–1	1–0	4–1	0–0	4–2
Rivarolese	3–1	3–0	2–1	2–0	2–3	3–1	1–0		0–0	0–1	0–3	0–3	2–0
Savona	5–1	3–1	2–0	2–1	4–2	2–0	3–1	1–1		3–0	2–1	2–1	3–0
Sestrese	1–2	2–1	11–0	2–0	5–0	3–3	1–2	2–1	2–0		1–0	3–0	0–0
Ventimiglia	3–1	1–3	2–0	5–0	8–1	2–0	3–0	0–0	2–1	1–1		1–3	2–0
Vigevanesi	6–1	3–1	0–0	6–0	2–0	0–1	3–0	3–0	6–0	6–0	3–1		4–0
Vogherese	7–0	1–0	0–0	2–0	2–0	2–1	2–0	4–1	3–1	5–1	4–0	1–1	

Updated to match(es) played on unknown. Source: Almanacco Illustrato del Calcio - La Storia 1898-2004, Panini Edizioni, Modena, September 2005 (in Italian)
Legend: Blue = home team win; Yellow = draw; Red = away team win.

=== Final rounds ===
Girone A
Final classification

Pos	Team	Pld	W	D	L	GF	GA	GD	Pts	Promotion
1	Comense (P)	6	4	2	0	19	4	+15	10	Promoted to Serie B
2	SPAL	6	3	1	2	11	11	0	7	
3	Pavia	6	1	2	3	12	15	−3	4	
4	Reggiana	6	0	3	3	8	20	−12	3	

Source: Panini
(P) Promoted

Results

Home \ Away	COM	PAV	REA	SPA
Comense		4–1	7–0	3–0
Pavia	2–2		4–0	2–4
Reggiana	1–1	3–3		2–2
SPAL	0–2	2–0	3–2	

Updated to match(es) played on unknown. Source: Almanacco Illustrato del Calcio - La Storia 1898-2004, Panini Edizioni, Modena, September 2005 (in Italian)
Legend: Blue = home team win; Yellow = draw; Red = away team win.

Girone B
Final classification

Pos	Team	Pld	W	D	L	GF	GA	GD	Pts	Promotion
1	Vigevanesi (P)	6	4	1	1	16	9	+7	9	Promoted to Serie B
2	Pro Gorizia	6	4	0	2	15	10	+5	8	
3	Forlì	6	2	0	4	10	12	−2	4	
4	Seregno	6	1	1	4	5	15	−10	3	

Source: Panini
(P) Promoted

Results

Home \ Away	FOR	PGO	SER	VIG
Forlì		4–1	2–0	2–3
Pro Gorizia	3–1		4–0	2–1
Seregno	2–0	1–3		1–1
Vigevanesi	3–1	3–2	5–1	

Updated to match(es) played on unknown. Source: Almanacco Illustrato del Calcio - La Storia 1898-2004, Panini Edizioni, Modena, September 2005 (in Italian)
Legend: Blue = home team win; Yellow = draw; Red = away team win.

Comense and Vigevanesi promoted to 1931–32 Serie B.

== Southern division ==
=== Girone E ===
Final classification

Pos	Team	Pld	W	D	L	GF	GA	GD	Pts	Qualification
1	Salernitana	22	16	3	3	38	13	+25	35	Qualified
2	Littorio Vomero	22	14	2	6	45	38	+7	30	
3	Messina	22	12	3	7	50	26	+24	27	
4	Reggina	22	10	5	7	35	28	+7	25	
5	Cotoniere Angri	22	8	7	7	30	32	−2	23	
6	Catania	22	10	1	11	47	36	+11	21	
7	Catanzarese	22	8	5	9	31	32	−1	21	
7	Gladiator	22	8	5	9	23	35	−12	21	
9	Siracusa	22	8	4	10	28	30	−2	20	
10	Cosenza	22	5	4	13	27	51	−24	14	
11	Bagnolese	22	6	2	14	34	44	−10	13 (Note: 1 point deducted.)	
12	Savoia (T)	22	4	5	13	22	42	−20	11 (Note: 2 points deducted.)	

Source: Panini
(T) Qualified, but not yet for the particular phase indicated
Notes:

Results

Home \ Away	BAG	CTN	CTZ	COS	CAN	GLA	LVO	MES	REG	SAL	SAV	SIR
Bagnolese		3–1	0–0	3–0	3–2	1–0	1–2	2–3	4–1	2–1	1–1	0–2
Catania	7–1		5–1	7–1	2–0	3–1	5–1	2–1	3–2	0–1	3–0	1–1
Catanzarese	2–1	3–0		2–1	0–1	5–0	3–1	2–0	1–0	2–2	2–3	1–1
Cosenza	2–6	4–1	2–2		1–1	2–0	1–0	1–1	0–2	1–0	3–0	3–0
Cotoniere Angri	4–2	4–1	0–0	2–1		1–1	1–1	2–1	1–1	1–1	3–1	2–1
Gladiator	1–0	2–1	2–1	3–0	1–0		2–2	1–1	1–0	1–2	2–1	0–1
Littorio Vomero	2–1	2–1	1–0	4–1	3–2	3–1		1–0	4–0	2–0	3–1	1–0
Messina	3–1	1–0	5–1	3–0	0–0	9–0	5–2		5–0	1–2	2–0	2–0
Reggina	2–1	3–2	2–0	2–1	4–1	0–0	2–1	4–0		0–0	3–0	4–0
Salernitana	1–0	0–1	3–1	4–0	4–0	1–0	4–1	2–1	1–0		2–0	1–0
Savoia	3–1	2–0	0–2	1–1	2–0	1–1	2–4	1–2	1–1	0–2		1–1
Siracusa	2–1	2–1	2–1	5–1	0–1	0–3	5–2	0–1	1–1	0–1	3–1	

Updated to match(es) played on unknown. Source: Almanacco Illustrato del Calcio - La Storia 1898-2004, Panini Edizioni, Modena, September 2005 (in Italian)
Legend: Blue = home team win; Yellow = draw; Red = away team win.

=== Girone F ===
Final classification

Pos	Team	Pld	W	D	L	GF	GA	GD	Pts	Qualification or relegation
1	Cagliari	22	15	5	2	51	16	+35	35	Qualified
2	Taranto	22	14	3	5	55	18	+37	31	
3	Foggia	22	14	2	6	41	30	+11	30	
4	Tranese	22	10	5	7	41	24	+17	25	
5	Maceratese	22	9	5	8	28	32	−4	23	
5	Perugia	22	9	5	8	29	21	+8	23	
7	Molfetta	22	8	5	9	29	31	−2	21	
8	Ascoli	22	7	5	10	23	32	−9	19	
8	Foligno	22	7	5	10	18	37	−19	19	
10	Biscegliese (E)	22	5	6	11	21	32	−11	16	Disbanded
11	Brindisi (E)	22	5	5	12	25	48	−23	15	Disbanded
12	Terni F.C. (T)	22	2	3	17	9	49	−40	5 (Note: 2 points deducted.)	

Source: Panini
(E) Eliminated; (T) Qualified, but not yet for the particular phase indicated
Notes:

Results

Home \ Away	ASC	BIS	BRI	CAG	FOG	FOL	MAC	MOL	PER	TAR	TER	TRA
Ascoli		0–0	1–0	1–1	0–1	1–1	4–1	1–0	1–1	1–2	2–0	1–5
Bisceglie	3–2		0–0	0–2	2–1	4–3	1–2	1–1	1–0	1–2	2–0	0–0
Brindisi	2–0	1–1		2–7	2–7	1–0	2–0	1–2	2–2	1–1	5–0	1–1
Cagliari	2–0	1–1	3–0		1–1	3–0	4–0	3–0	3–0	2–0	3–0	2–0
Foggia	3–0	3–2	3–1	1–2		2–1	2–1	3–0	1–0	2–1	2–1	2–1
Foligno	2–1	1–0	2–0	1–1	2–1		0–0	0–2	0–0	0–3	2–1	2–1
Maceratese	1–0	2–1	5–0	2–2	1–1	1–0		1–0	1–0	0–2	4–1	4–3
Molfetta	1–1	3–1	2–1	2–3	1–2	0–1	1–1		2–0	2–2	1–0	2–1
Perugia	3–2	4–2	4–0	0–1	3–0	2–0	2–1	0–0		2–0	2–0	3–1
Taranto	4–0	0–2	4–1	2–0	4–0	11–0	4–0	4–1	1–0		4–0	0–0
Terni FC	0–2	2–0	0–2	1–3	1–3	1–0	0–0	0–2	2–2	0–1		0–0
Tranese	1–2	2–0	3–0	2–1	3–0	0–0	2–0	2–1	2–0	3–2	2–0	

Updated to match(es) played on unknown. Source: Almanacco Illustrato del Calcio - La Storia 1898-2004, Panini Edizioni, Modena, September 2005 (in Italian)
Legend: Blue = home team win; Yellow = draw; Red = away team win.

=== Final round ===
	Final round		City and date
Salernitana	1 - 1	Cagliari	Salerno, April 26, 1931
Cagliari	2 - 1	Salernitana	Cagliari, May 3, 1931

Final classification

Pos	Team	Pld	W	D	L	GF	GA	GD	Pts	Promotion
1	Cagliari (P)	2	1	1	0	3	2	+1	3	Promoted to Serie B
2	Salernitana	2	0	1	1	2	3	−1	1	

Source: Panini
(P) Promoted

Cagliari promoted to 1931–32 Serie B.
