= 1931–32 Prima Divisione =

Prima Divisione
- Season: 1931–32
- Promoted: Sampierdarenese; Grion Pola; Messina
- Relegated: solely disbanded clubs

The 1931–32 Prima Divisione was the third level league of the 32nd Italian football championship.

In 1928, FIGC had decided a reform of the league structure of Italian football. The top-level league was the National Division, composed by the two divisions of Serie A and Serie B. Under them, there were the local championship, the major one being the First Division, that in 1935 will take the name of Serie C. Starting from 1930-31 season, the winners of the six groups of First Division would be admitted to the final rounds, where three tickets of promotion to Serie B were available, whereas the scheduled relegations were annulled by the Federation which expanded the division.

== Teams ==
The championship rose from 80 to 90 clubs with a special guest. Five new teams had arrived from the regional leagues.

== Regulation ==
Six groups of 15 teams with two three final groups, thirty-six matchdays. Final group winners were promoted, ultimate clubs in the regular season should be relegated.

== Girone A ==
=== Final classification ===
Pos	Team	Pld	W	D	L	GF	GA	GD	Pts	Qualification or relegation
1	SPAL	22	16	3	3	63	23	+40	35	Qualified
2	Grion Pola	22	14	4	4	50	38	+12	32	Qualified
3	Mantova	22	15	1	6	53	38	+15	31	
4	Fiumana	22	11	7	4	40	26	+14	29	
5	Ponziana	22	11	6	5	46	33	+13	28	
6	Thiene	22	13	2	7	45	53	−8	28	
7	Treviso	22	12	3	7	44	35	+9	27	
8	Vicenza	22	10	5	7	42	30	+12	25	
9	Rovigo	22	8	7	7	39	29	+10	23	
10	Pro Gorizia	22	8	5	9	35	38	−3	21	
11	Mestrina	22	8	4	10	32	52	−20	20	
12	Schio	22	4	4	14	18	51	−33	11 (Note: 1 point deducted?)	
13	Mirandolese (D, R)	22	2	3	17	21	64	−43	7	Relegated by the FIGC (Note: Renounced to play to the following season.)
14	Dolo (D, R)	0	–	–	–	–	–	—	0	Retired and relegated (Note: Retired after 18 matches. All their results were voided.)
15	Lonigo (R, E)	0	–	–	–	–	–	—	0	Retired and disbanded (Note: Retired after 17 matches. All their results were voided.)

Source: Panini
(D) Disqualified; (E) Eliminated; (R) Relegated

=== Results ===
Home \ Away	DOL	FIU	GRP	LON	MAN	MST	MIR	PON	PGO	ROV	SCH	SPA	THI	TRV	VIC
Dolo		.–.	.–.	2–2	.–.	2–0	2–3	1–1	.–.	0–1	2–2	2–3	0–2	1–2	1–3
Fiumana	4–0		3–0	4–1	2–0	2–2	5–2	2–2	2–1	0–0	2–0	1–0	2–0	2–0	4–2
Grion Pola	5–0	3–1		3–0	1–0	2–1	5–0	1–1	4–0	1–0	4–0	1–1	7–2	4–1	1–0
Lonigo	.–.	2–3	.–.		2–1	3–3	.–.	.–.	0–0	1–1	2–1	.–.	1–2	.–.	2–3
Mantova	3–0	2–1	3–1	.–.		1–0	5–1	4–0	5–2	3–1	2–0	2–3	2–0	4–2	3–1
Mestrina	2–1	1–1	2–2	.–.	1–2		4–2	1–0	1–0	1–0	2–3	0–1	4–1	3–1	1–4
Mirandolese	2–0	0–4	0–1	5–0	1–3	0–2		0–2	0–1	0–0	2–3	2–3	1–0	0–2	1–1
Ponziana	.–.	0–1	2–2	8–0	7–0	7–2	2–2		1–2	3–0	4–1	2–1	2–1	1–1	2–4
Pro Gorizia	11–1	3–0	0–3	.–.	1–1	6–1	3–0	0–0		1–1	2–0	1–5	1–0	1–2	3–1
Rovigo	.–.	.–.	1–0	.–.	1–0	2–0	4–0	0–1	5–1		4–1	2–1	5–1	2–2	1–1
Schio	3–1	1–1	1–2	.–.	3–4	0–1	0–4	0–2	0–0	1–1		0–2	0–2	0–2	0–2
SPAL	9–1	2–0	7–0	6–0	4–1	4–0	6–1	3–0	0–2	7–2	4–1		1–1	2–0	2–1
Thiene	.–.	0–2	4–2	3–1	2–1	6–0	3–2	2–1	3–2	5–1	0–2	0–3		4–1	1–0
Treviso	5–1	2–1	0–2	4–0	3–1	1–1	1–0	3–0	1–0	2–1	0–1	2–0	3–0		2–1
Vicenza	.–.	1–0	5–1	.–.	0–1	5–0	2–0	0–1	1–1	1–1	4–1	1–1	3–0	2–1	

Updated to match(es) played on unknown. Source: Almanacco Illustrato del Calcio - La Storia 1898-2004, Panini Edizioni, Modena, September 2005 (in Italian)
Legend: Blue = home team win; Yellow = draw; Red = away team win.

== Girone B ==
=== Final classification ===
Pos	Team	Pld	W	D	L	GF	GA	GD	Pts	Qualification or relegation
1	Forlì	26	19	6	1	67	24	+43	44	Qualified
2	Pavia	26	17	6	3	74	32	+42	40	Qualified
3	Prato	26	17	1	8	67	37	+30	35	
4	Reggiana	26	13	3	10	57	48	+9	29	
5	Codogno	26	10	7	9	29	31	−2	27	
6	Piacenza	26	11	4	11	59	44	+15	26	
7	Aquila Montevarchi	26	10	4	12	57	62	−5	24	
8	Vogherese	26	9	5	12	39	43	−4	22 (Note: 1 point deducted)	
8	Ravenna	26	8	6	12	36	47	−11	22	
10	Faenza (E)	26	9	3	14	41	55	−14	21	Disbanded
11	Carpi	26	9	3	14	39	43	−4	19 (Note: 2 points deducted)	
11	83ª L. M.V.S.N. Fiorenzuola	26	8	4	14	40	75	−35	19	
13	Fanfulla	26	6	5	15	32	60	−28	17	
14	Russi	26	5	5	16	29	65	−36	15	
15	Littorio Firenze (R, E)	0	–	–	–	–	–	—	0	Excluded and disbanded (Note: Excluded from the championship.)

Source: Panini
(E) Eliminated; (R) Relegated

=== Results ===
Home \ Away	AMO	CRP	COD	FAE	FAN	FRN	FOR	Lit	PAV	PIA	PRA	RAV	REA	RUS	VOG
Aquila Montevarchi		1–1	1–0	4–1	3–3	1–2	2–2	5–0	1–1	3–4	4–2	4–3	5–1	5–1	1–1
Carpi	4–2		1–2	2–1	4–2	4–0	1–2	3–0	0–2	1–0	0–2	4–1	0–1	3–1	5–1
Codogno	3–0	2–0		1–0	0–0	2–1	1–3	1–0	2–0	0–0	0–2	1–0	3–2	3–0	0–0
Faenza	4–1	3–2	1–0		2–1	1–1	1–3	4–2	2–3	4–0	1–3	2–2	1–0	1–0	2–1
Fanfulla	3–1	3–0	2–2	3–1		2–2	1–2	3–1	1–2	0–4	0–2	2–1	1–2	2–2	2–1
Fiorenzuola	2–6	1–0	3–0	5–4	2–3		0–3	2–1	1–2	1–0	1–4	0–2	1–0	3–1	1–1
Forlì	5–1	2–2	1–1	4–1	4–0	5–0		3–0	3–2	2–0	3–0	2–1	2–1	2–0	1–0
Littorio Firenze	1–0	1–1	0–5	.–.	.–.	0–2	1–1		0–4	.–.	0–4	0–0	1–0	2–1	.–.
Pavia	2–1	3–0	6–1	2–0	4–1	9–1	1–1	9–0		2–1	2–0	6–0	6–0	4–1	1–0
Piacenza	7–1	5–1	1–0	3–0	8–0	2–2	1–4	4–1	3–3		4–0	2–0	5–1	2–0	3–1
Prato	4–3	2–1	3–2	3–0	3–0	5–1	3–1	5–0	2–2	4–0		2–1	7–1	8–1	0–1
Ravenna	2–1	1–0	0–0	2–3	2–0	3–2	1–5	3–1	1–1	1–1	4–2		0–0	3–1	2–3
Reggiana	5–1	2–1	1–1	3–1	2–1	6–1	2–2	7–2	1–3	6–0	3–2	2–1		6–0	5–0
Russi	2–3	1–1	0–2	4–4	1–1	1–4	0–2	6–1	3–1	3–1	1–0	0–0	2–1		2–0
Vogherese	1–0	0–1	3–0	2–0	3–1	8–2	1–1	4–1	4–4	3–2	0–2	1–2	0–2	3–1	

Updated to match(es) played on unknown. Source: Almanacco Illustrato del Calcio - La Storia 1898-2004, Panini Edizioni, Modena, September 2005 (in Italian)
Legend: Blue = home team win; Yellow = draw; Red = away team win.

== Girone C ==
=== Final classification ===
Pos	Team	Pld	W	D	L	GF	GA	GD	Pts	Qualification
1	Seregno	28	18	8	2	51	20	+31	44	Qualified
2	Saronno (Note: Promoted after tie-breaker: Lecco-Saronno 2-3.)	28	16	5	7	68	34	+34	38 (Note: 1 bonus point?)	Qualified
3	Lecco	28	16	6	6	64	33	+31	38	
4	Monza	28	15	5	8	55	33	+22	35	
5	Clarense	28	14	4	10	43	34	+9	32	
6	Pro Lissone	28	11	9	8	50	41	+9	31	
7	Gallaratese	28	13	4	11	66	54	+12	30	
8	Galliatese	28	10	8	10	45	47	−2	28	
9	Varese	28	9	9	10	36	30	+6	27	
10	Biellese	28	9	7	12	36	55	−19	25	
11	Vis Nova Giussano	28	9	7	12	36	42	−6	25	
12	Intrese	28	8	8	12	33	49	−16	24	
13	Crema	28	8	5	15	35	59	−24	21	
14	Trevigliese	28	6	2	20	32	85	−53	14	
15	Abbiategrasso (T)	28	3	5	20	37	71	−34	11	

Source: Panini
(T) Qualified, but not yet for the particular phase indicated

=== Results ===
Home \ Away	ABB	BIE	CLA	CRM	GLR	GTS	INT	LCO	MON	PLI	SAR	SER	TVG	VAR	VNG
Abbiategrasso		2–2	1–2	3–4	2–3	2–2	1–1	0–2	1–3	3–3	2–3	0–2	2–2	1–0	4–0
Biellese	3–1		1–0	2–0	2–1	2–1	1–1	3–2	2–2	2–2	1–1	0–4	3–0	2–0	0–0
Clarense	6–1	4–0		0–1	2–1	1–0	2–0	1–1	1–0	2–0	0–0	1–0	5–0	0–0	1–0
Crema	2–1	2–0	1–4		2–0	3–1	4–1	0–9	0–0	0–1	1–3	1–1	2–3	1–1	1–1
Gallaratese	5–0	4–1	5–1	1–0		6–1	6–1	2–2	2–2	4–2	3–2	3–0	5–1	0–0	1–0
Galliatese	4–0	2–0	1–1	2–1	3–1		0–2	2–1	1–1	1–1	2–1	0–2	2–0	1–0	5–0
Intra	2–1	1–1	2–3	2–0	2–1	3–1		1–1	3–1	2–2	0–0	2–1	1–1	1–2	2–1
Lecco	5–4	1–0	3–0	3–1	6–1	2–1	5–1		2–1	2–1	2–1	2–2	7–1	1–0	1–0
Monza	3–1	7–1	1–0	3–2	4–1	1–1	4–0	1–0		2–1	3–4	2–0	6–1	2–0	2–0
Pro Lissone	2–1	2–1	4–1	2–2	4–2	5–1	0–0	2–0	2–1		1–0	0–0	3–0	0–1	4–0
Saronno	2–0	5–1	3–0	4–0	6–3	2–2	4–1	2–2	1–0	3–0		0–1	5–0	6–0	5–3
Seregno	2–0	3–2	1–0	3–1	3–0	2–2	2–0	0–0	3–1	3–1	5–2		3–0	1–0	2–0
Trevigliese	1–3	1–2	1–2	3–0	1–4	3–1	1–0	3–0	0–1	3–1	1–4	0–2		2–4	0–4
Varese	3–0	3–1	3–1	3–0	1–1	2–2	1–0	1–2	0–1	2–2	0–2	0–0	9–0		0–0
Vis Nova Giussano	2–0	3–0	3–2	2–3	3–0	1–1	2–1	1–0	3–0	2–2	0–0	0–0	4–3	0–0	

Updated to match(es) played on unknown. Source: Almanacco Illustrato del Calcio - La Storia 1898-2004, Panini Edizioni, Modena, September 2005 (in Italian)
Legend: Blue = home team win; Yellow = draw; Red = away team win.

== Girone D ==
=== Final classification ===
Pos	Team	Pld	W	D	L	GF	GA	GD	Pts	Qualification or relegation
1	Savona	30	20	2	8	64	35	+29	42	Qualified
2	Sampierdarenese	30	16	9	5	50	34	+16	41	Qualified
3	Rapallo Ruentes	30	12	10	8	40	32	+8	34	
4	Empoli	30	13	7	10	52	33	+19	33	
5	Andrea Doria	30	13	7	10	45	35	+10	33	
6	Derthona	30	14	4	12	53	47	+6	32	
7	Pisa	30	12	7	11	62	40	+22	31	
7	Ventimigliese	30	12	7	11	36	36	0	31	
7	"Vezio Parducci" Viareggio	30	13	5	12	46	50	−4	31	
10	Carrarese "Pietrino Binelli"	30	13	3	14	48	49	−1	29	
10	Lucchese	30	13	3	14	39	46	−7	29	
12	Rivarolese (D, R)	30	9	9	12	41	51	−10	27	Relegated by the FIGC (Note: Excluded from Prima Divisione 1932-33.)
13	Sestrese	30	10	6	14	44	51	−7	26	
14	Imperia	30	9	5	16	35	43	−8	22 (Note: 1 point deducted)	
15	Acqui (R)	30	6	8	16	31	59	−28	19	Relegated
16	Pontedecimo (T)	30	6	6	18	25	70	−45	18	

Source: Panini
(D) Disqualified; (R) Relegated; (T) Qualified, but not yet for the particular phase indicated

=== Results ===
Home \ Away	ACQ	ADO	CAR	DER	EMP	IMP	LUC	PIS	PON	RAP	RIV	SAM	SVN	SES	Ven	VIA
Acqui		3–0	2–0	0–0	1–1	1–0	0–2	1–1	3–1	1–1	1–1	0–3	1–2	2–2	0–0	1–0
Andrea Doria	3–1		2–1	1–0	2–0	2–1	1–0	3–3	5–0	3–0	2–3	1–1	1–2	2–1	1–0	4–0
Carrarese	2–3	0–2		2–0	1–0	4–1	2–0	2–1	5–0	2–2	2–1	1–1	1–2	3–2	3–1	4–0
Derthona	1–0	1–0	4–1		5–2	2–1	3–1	1–0	3–1	2–3	7–2	3–2	2–0	2–1	6–0	4–0
Empoli	2–0	3–0	3–0	4–1		1–0	2–0	1–0	5–0	3–0	0–1	4–0	1–0	4–0	1–0	1–1
Imperia	1–2	2–1	0–2	2–0	2–1		6–1	2–0	2–1	1–0	4–1	1–2	0–1	0–0	1–0	2–2
Lucchese	1–0	1–1	1–0	5–1	3–2	1–0		0–1	2–1	2–2	1–2	3–1	3–1	3–0	2–2	1–2
Pisa	2–0	0–1	6–2	4–1	3–1	4–2	1–2		5–1	2–0	6–0	0–0	5–0	5–0	2–0	2–2
Pontedecimo	1–1	2–1	2–2	1–0	1–1	0–0	1–2	3–1		1–1	0–1	0–0	1–3	2–1	1–2	3–1
Rapallo Ruentes	3–0	1–1	1–0	1–1	3–2	1–0	3–0	1–1	1–0		2–0	0–0	1–0	4–0	1–0	4–0
Rivarolese	8–1	3–3	2–0	0–0	1–1	1–1	2–1	2–2	0–1	1–1		1–1	3–2	0–1	2–1	1–1
Sampierdarenese	3–1	2–2	3–2	2–1	1–0	2–0	2–0	4–3	3–0	3–1	1–0		3–1	1–1	0–1	3–1
Savona	4–2	2–0	2–0	3–0	3–3	2–0	3–0	2–0	3–0	1–2	5–1	4–1		3–0	3–1	4–0
Sestrese	3–0	0–0	1–3	1–1	1–1	5–1	3–0	3–0	1–0	3–1	2–1	1–2	0–4		2–0	2–1
Ventimiglia	3–2	1–0	1–0	3–1	1–1	2–1	0–1	1–1	5–0	0–0	1–0	1–1	1–1	3–2		4–0
Viareggio	7–2	1–0	4–0	4–0	2–1	1–1	1–0	2–1	5–0	1–0	2–0	0–1	2–3	2–0	1–0	

Updated to match(es) played on unknown. Source: Almanacco Illustrato del Calcio - La Storia 1898-2004, Panini Edizioni, Modena, September 2005 (in Italian)
Legend: Blue = home team win; Yellow = draw; Red = away team win.

== Girone E ==
=== Final classification ===
Pos	Team	Pld	W	D	L	GF	GA	GD	Pts	Qualification or relegation
1	Perugia	26	17	4	5	71	22	+49	38	Qualified
2	Foggia	26	16	3	7	74	27	+47	35	Qualified
3	Foligno	26	13	8	5	35	19	+16	34	
4	Ternana	26	14	3	9	47	37	+10	31	
5	Torres	26	13	4	9	38	33	+5	30	
6	Grosseto	26	12	4	10	45	29	+16	28	
7	Sepre Avanti, Piombino	26	11	4	11	41	45	−4	26	
7	Arezzo	26	11	4	11	30	40	−10	26	
9	Robur	26	11	3	12	38	38	0	25	
10	Ascoli	26	8	6	12	32	43	−11	21 (Note: 1 point deducted.)	
11	Littorio Vomero (E)	26	9	3	14	28	49	−21	19 (Note: 2 points deducted.)	Disbanded
11	Anconitana	26	6	8	12	24	44	−20	19	
13	Emilio Bianchi, Ancona (E)	26	5	4	17	26	62	−36	14	Merged (Note: Merged with Anconitana.)
14	Gladiator	26	5	4	17	24	65	−41	12	
15	Maceratese (R, E)	0	–	–	–	–	–	—	0	Retired (Note: Retired after 8 matches. All their games were voided. A new Maceratese was refounded.)

Source: Panini
(E) Eliminated; (R) Relegated

=== Results ===
Home \ Away	ANC	ARE	ASC	BIA	FOG	FOL	GLA	GRO	LVO	MAC	PER	PIO	ROB	TER	SST
Anconitana		1–0	0–0	0–1	1–1	0–0	1–0	4–2	0–2	.–.	1–0	3–0	2–0	0–2	1–1
Arezzo	3–2		2–1	2–0	1–0	1–1	3–0	0–0	5–0	.–.	0–2	1–0	1–0	2–0	1–0
Ascoli	3–1	3–1		2–0	0–1	1–1	2–0	1–2	3–2	.–.	1–2	2–0	2–0	1–1	0–0
Bianchi Ancona	1–1	0–0	2–2		1–3	1–0	2–0	2–0	1–2	6–0	0–3	1–1	4–0	0–3	1–2
Foggia	1–1	8–0	5–1	4–0		2–0	8–0	2–1	7–1	.–.	4–1	6–0	4–2	5–2	4–0
Foligno	5–1	2–1	1–0	2–0	2–0		2–0	0–1	1–0	.–.	1–1	2–0	0–0	1–0	4–0
Gladiator	1–1	1–3	2–1	5–2	1–2	2–0		1–1	0–0	.–.	1–1	0–2	0–2	1–2	1–2
Grosseto	7–0	2–1	3–1	4–1	1–0	0–1	8–0		1–2	.–.	0–0	3–1	4–0	2–0	1–0
Littorio Vomero	2–1	1–0	2–2	1–0	1–0	1–3	1–2	0–2		.–.	1–0	1–0	1–1	5–0	0–2
Maceratese	.–.	1–1	.–.	.–.	.–.	.–.	4–5	.–.	.–.		.–.	.–.	.–.	.–.	.–.
Perugia	4–0	7–0	7–0	8–2	3–2	0–0	7–1	1–0	3–0	4–0		3–0	4–0	2–0	2–0
Piombino	2–1	4–1	1–2	4–2	1–1	2–2	4–2	1–4	2–0	.–.	2–1		2–1	4–1	1–1
Robur	3–0	1–1	3–1	6–0	2–0	0–0	2–3	3–0	1–0	1–1	0–2	2–0		3–2	4–1
Ternana	3–1	3–0	1–0	3–1	0–4	1–1	5–0	1–1	3–0	.–.	2–0	2–0	1–0		3–1
Torres	0–0	1–0	1–2	3–1	4–0	3–0	1–0	1–0	3–1	.–.	3–1	3–2	1–2	3–1	

Updated to match(es) played on unknown. Source: Almanacco Illustrato del Calcio - La Storia 1898-2004, Panini Edizioni, Modena, September 2005 (in Italian)
Legend: Blue = home team win; Yellow = draw; Red = away team win.

== Girone F ==
=== Final classification ===
Pos	Team	Pld	W	D	L	GF	GA	GD	Pts	Qualification or relegation
1	Salernitana	28	19	5	4	51	19	+32	43	Qualified
2	Messina	28	18	5	5	75	30	+45	41	Qualified
3	Siracusa	28	17	3	8	64	28	+36	37	
3	Savoia	28	16	5	7	53	32	+21	37	
5	Taranto	28	15	5	8	40	42	−2	35	
6	Catania	28	15	4	9	59	31	+28	34	
6	Reggina	28	12	10	6	50	29	+21	34	
8	Cosenza	28	15	3	10	56	36	+20	33	
9	Catanzarese	28	11	5	12	39	38	+1	26 (Note: 1 point deducted.)	
10	Calcio Molfetta	28	9	7	12	32	44	−12	25	
11	Trani (E)	28	9	6	13	32	42	−10	23	Disbanded
12	Bagnolese	28	5	7	16	25	60	−35	16	
13	Peloro Messina	28	5	5	18	25	63	−38	14	
14	Cotoniere Angri	28	3	5	20	17	62	−45	10	
15	Stabiese (T)	28	1	5	22	16	78	−62	5 (Note: 2 points deducted.)	

Source: Panini
(E) Eliminated; (T) Qualified, but not yet for the particular phase indicated

=== Results ===
Home \ Away	BAG	CTN	CTZ	COS	CAN	MES	MOL	PEL	REG	SAL	SAV	SIR	STA	TAR	TRN
Bagnolese		2–2	1–1	0–0	2–2	0–2	0–0	5–1	1–3	0–1	0–1	2–1	3–1	1–0	1–1
Catania	9–0		3–0	3–0	4–1	4–1	4–0	2–0	4–2	0–1	4–2	1–1	2–0	2–0	2–0
Catanzarese	3–0	1–0		2–1	1–0	1–2	1–0	1–1	2–2	2–2	0–1	2–1	5–0	1–2	0–2
Cosenza	5–1	2–1	4–0		2–0	3–4	7–2	2–0	1–0	1–0	3–0	4–2	5–0	4–1	2–0
Cotoniere Angri	4–1	0–0	0–2	0–1		5–2	0–1	0–2	0–2	2–4	0–1	1–1	2–0	0–1	1–0
Messina	3–0	6–3	2–1	2–0	8–1		2–1	3–0	2–2	2–0	3–1	2–4	5–0	8–1	6–0
Molfetta	1–0	0–1	3–2	2–0	0–0	1–0		4–0	1–1	0–1	3–2	0–3	4–0	1–3	1–1
Peloro Messina	1–1	1–4	0–3	1–1	3–0	0–3	0–2		2–1	0–4	1–2	0–0	5–4	1–2	2–1
Reggina	5–0	3–1	0–0	4–1	3–0	0–0	4–1	1–1		1–1	2–0	2–1	4–0	3–3	1–0
Salernitana	3–0	1–0	2–0	2–1	4–0	1–0	3–0	2–0	0–0		1–0	2–0	6–1	1–0	2–0
Savoia	1–0	3–0	2–1	3–1	3–1	0–0	1–1	4–1	2–0	1–1		2–1	6–1	4–0	4–0
Siracusa	3–0	2–0	2–1	1–0	7–0	3–1	4–0	4–0	3–2	2–0	3–1		5–0	1–1	5–0
Stabiese	1–2	0–0	0–2	1–0	0–0	0–2	1–1	1–1	0–1	1–1	1–3	0–2		0–1	1–0
Taranto	2–0	1–0	1–4	1–1	2–0	0–0	2–1	4–2	2–1	3–2	1–1	2–0	2–1		2–0
Trani	2–1	0–2	4–0	4–3	3–0	1–1	1–1	1–0	0–0	0–1	2–2	2–1	5–0	2–0	

Updated to match(es) played on unknown. Source: Almanacco Illustrato del Calcio - La Storia 1898-2004, Panini Edizioni, Modena, September 2005 (in Italian)
Legend: Blue = home team win; Yellow = draw; Red = away team win.

== Final rounds ==
=== Girone A ===
Pos	Team	Pld	W	D	L	Pts	Promotion	GRP	FOG	SAL	FOR
1	Grion Pola (P)	6	3	1	2	7	1932–33 Serie B		4–2	4–2	1–0
2	Foggia	6	3	0	3	6		1–1		3–2	6–2
3	Salernitana	6	3	0	3	6		3–0	5–2		1–0
4	Forlì	6	2	1	3	5		1–1	5–1	8–0	

Updated to match(es) played on unknown. Source: Almanacco Illustrato del Calcio - La Storia 1898-2004, Panini Edizioni, Modena, September 2005 (in Italian)
(P) Promoted

=== Girone B ===
Pos	Team	Pld	W	D	L	Pts	Promotion	MES	SPA	SVN	SAR
1	Messina (P)	4	3	0	1	6	1932–33 Serie B		3–0	3–0	
2	SPAL	4	2	0	2	4		1–2		6–0	
3	Savona	4	1	0	3	2		2–0	2–3		
4	Saronno (Note: Renounced to play the final round.)	0	0	0	0	0					

Updated to match(es) played on unknown. Source: Almanacco Illustrato del Calcio - La Storia 1898-2004, Panini Edizioni, Modena, September 2005 (in Italian)
(P) Promoted

=== Girone C ===
Pos	Team	Pld	W	D	L	Pts	Promotion	SAM	PER	PAV	SER
1	Sampierdarenese (P)	6	4	1	1	9	1932–33 Serie B		3–2	4–2	3–2
2	Perugia	6	4	0	2	8		2–1		2–1	9–1
3	Pavia	6	2	2	2	6		3–3	4–1		1–1
4	Seregno	6	0	1	5	1		1–2	0–2	0–1	

Updated to match(es) played on unknown. Source: Almanacco Illustrato del Calcio - La Storia 1898-2004, Panini Edizioni, Modena, September 2005 (in Italian)
(P) Promoted
