= Stadio Libero Lolli =

Sport facility in Mirandola, Italy

Libero Lolli stadium
- Stadio Libero Lolli
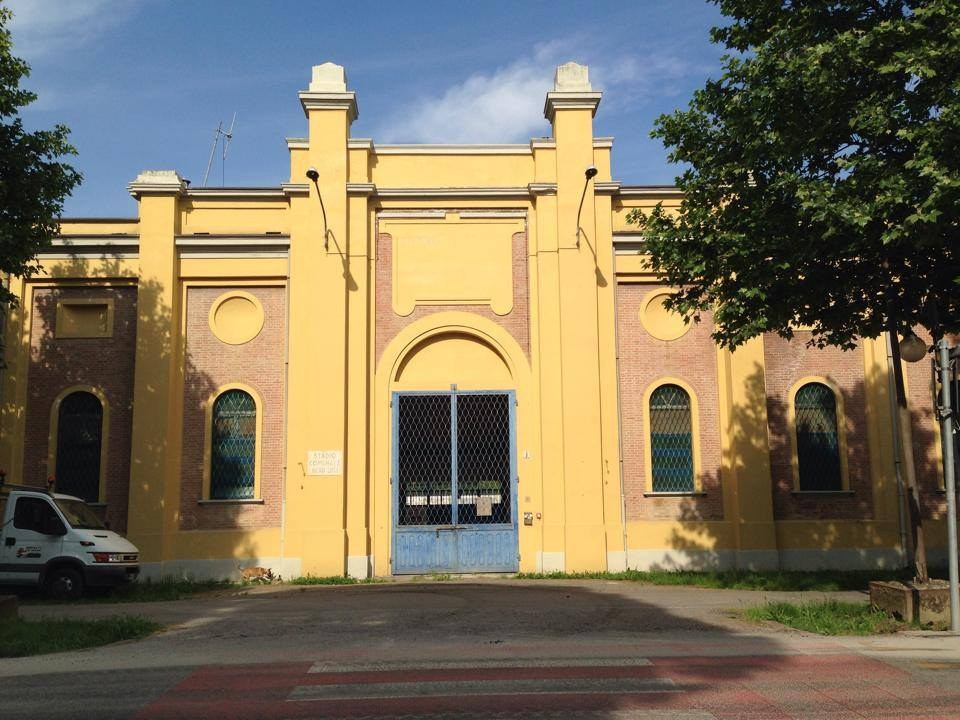
- Stadium facade
- Interactive map of Libero Lolli stadium
- Address: viale Circonvallazione est, 21; Mirandola; Italy
- Coordinates: 44.888399°N 11.070073°E
- Elevation: 18 m (59 ft) -->
- Owner: Municipality of Mirandola
- Operator: Ge. Me. Sport srl
- Capacity: 400
- Type: Football stadium
- Surface: Grass

Construction
- Groundbreaking: 1920
- Opened: 1929
- Architect: Mario Guerzoni

Libero Lolli stadium is a sport facility in Mirandola, in the province of Modena, Italy.

The stadium is dedicated to the memory of Libero Lolli, a Mirandola footballer who died prematurely on 23 September 1934 at the age of just 24, shortly before his debut in Serie A with the Livorno, and brother of Nino Lolli (first mayor of Mirandola after the Second World War).

The stadium hosted the home matches of the Unione Sportiva Mirandolese from 1920 to 2005, and later those of Mortizzuolese. In the 1998–1999 season, all the home matches of the women's Serie A championship of Bellentani Modena, holder of the title of Italian champion at the time, were played at Lolli stadium.

== History ==
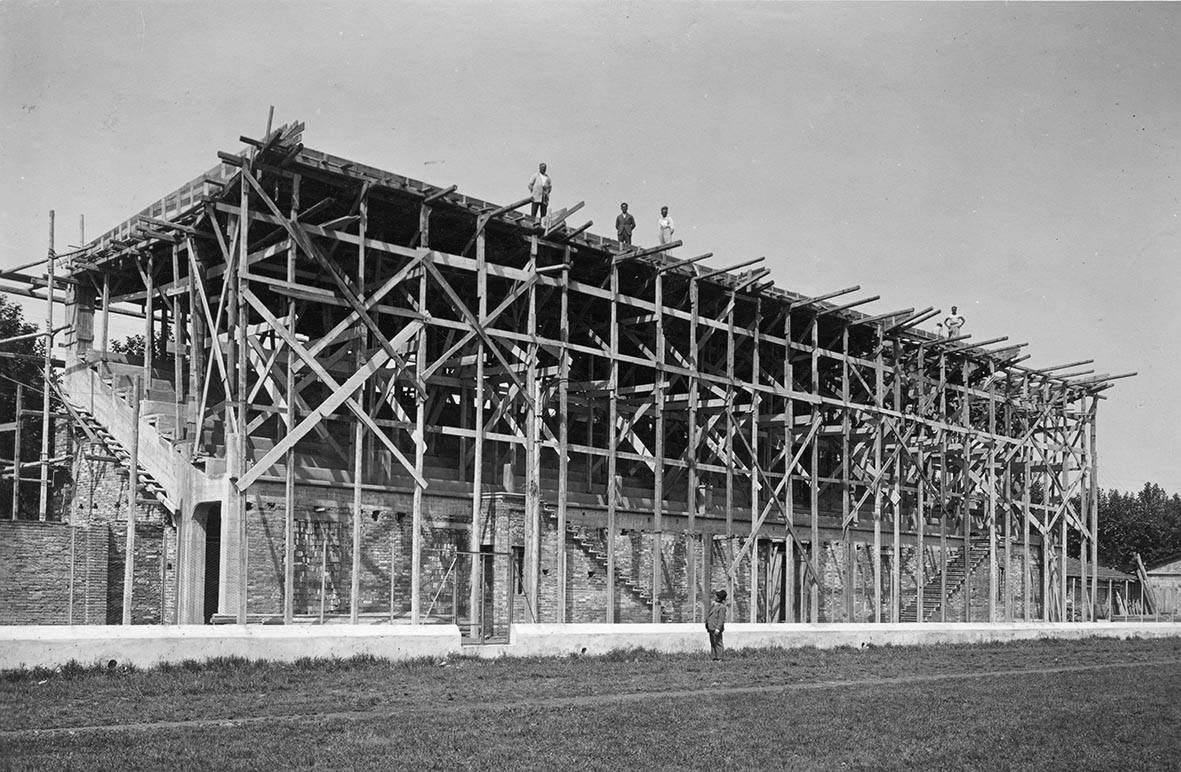
Building grandstand (1929)

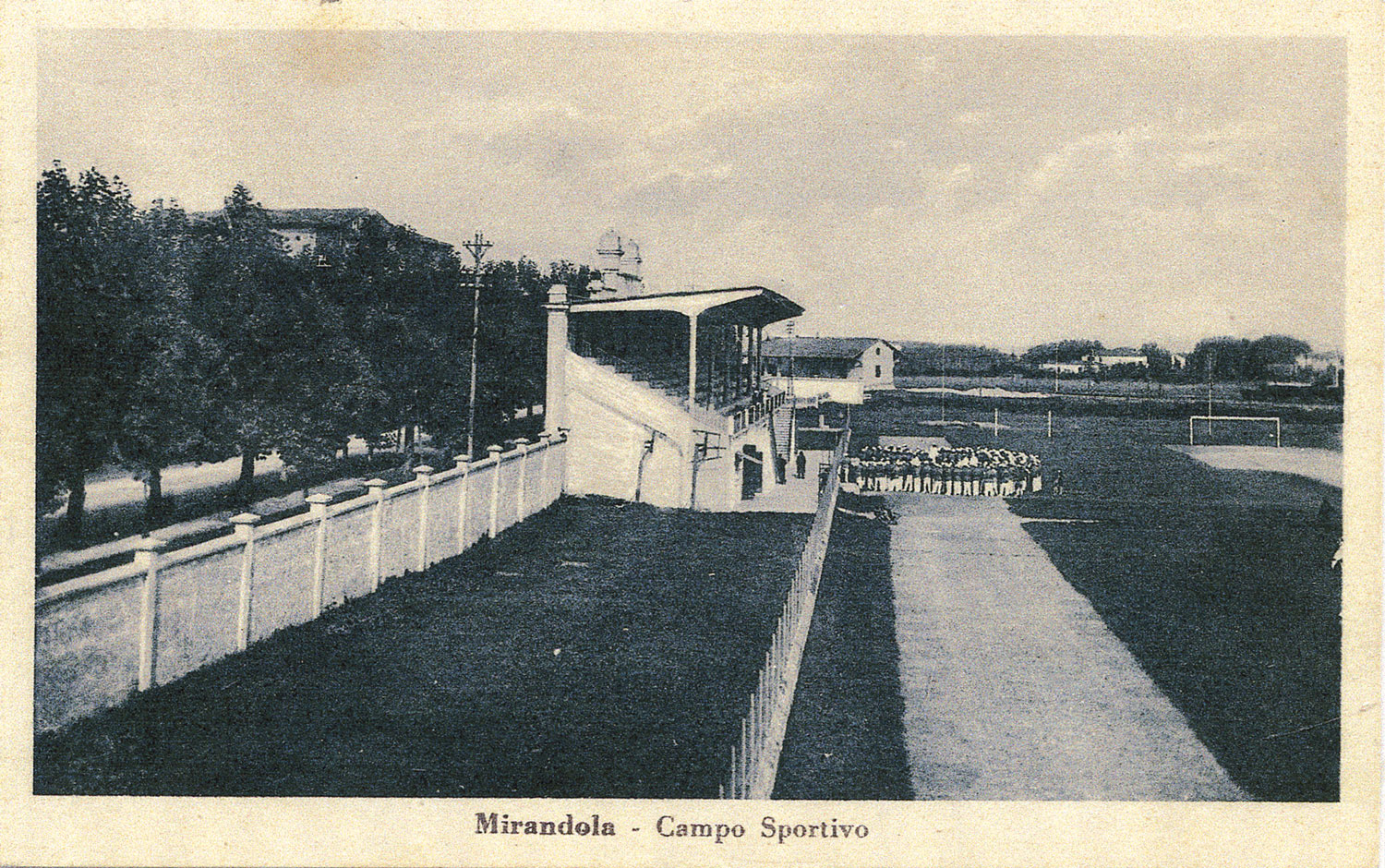
Inauguration of the Mirandola stadium (1930)

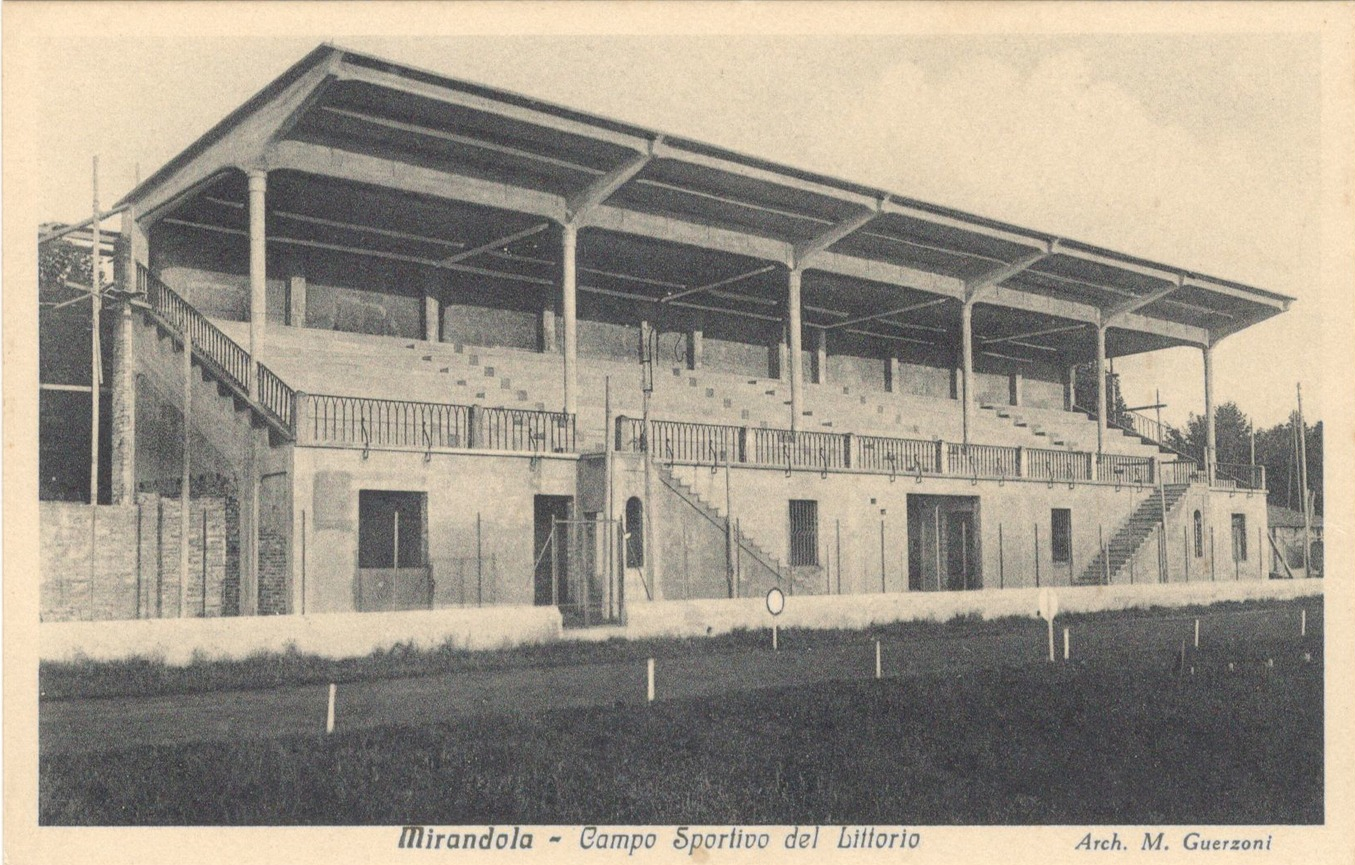
Mirandola - Campo Sportivo del Littorio

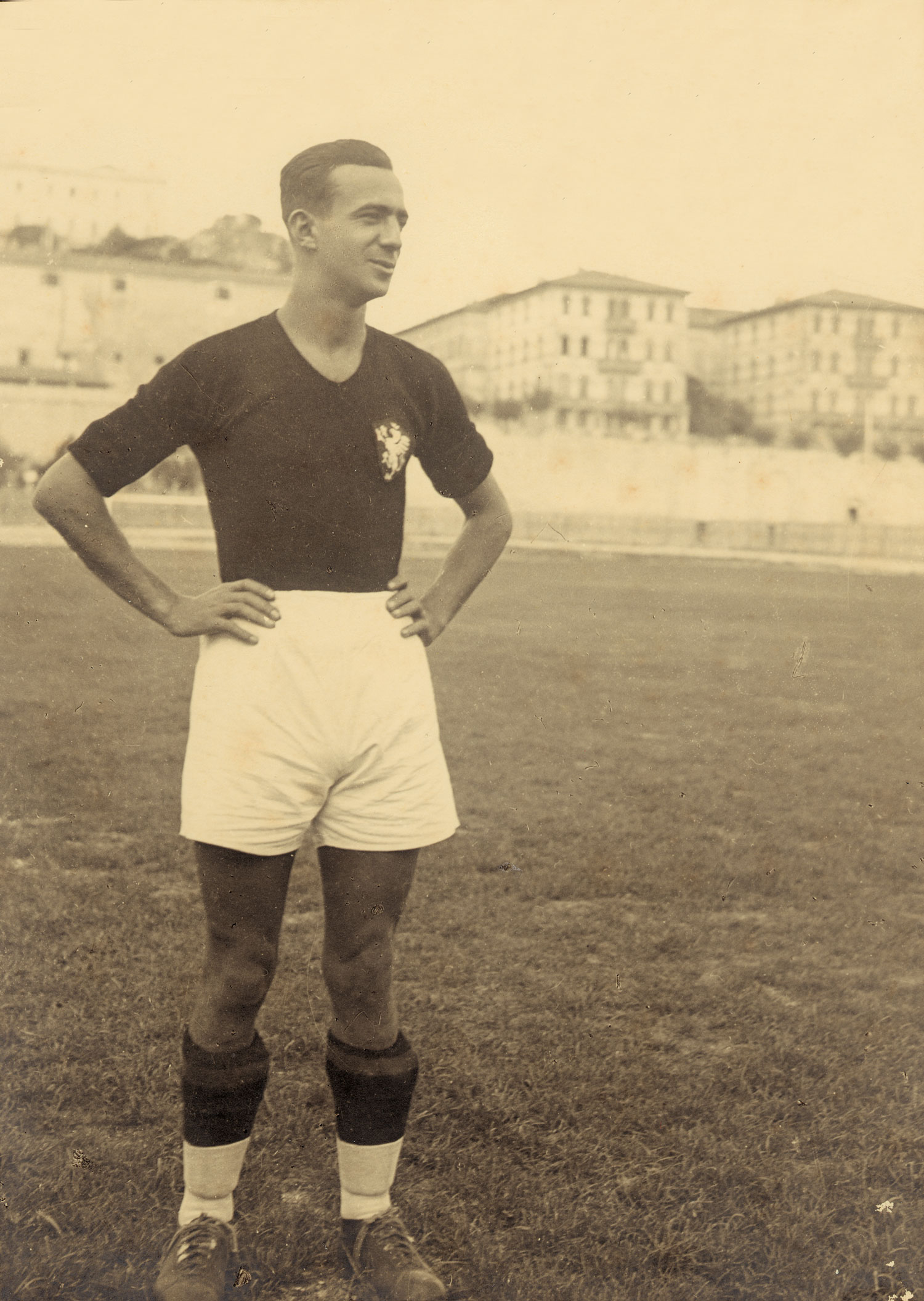
Libero Lolli (1930)

History of football in Mirandola began on 15 March 1911, when the "Foot-Ball Club Giovanni Pico" was founded, which asked the municipal administration for the concession of a plot of land of about 3 biolche (9,000 square metres (11,000 sq yd)) placed in the 9<up>th</up> trunk Spalti in order to build a sports field. However, the land was leased, so the first playing field was built on the side of the west ring road. This first football experience ended, however, with the outbreak of the First World War.

During the Fascist era it was decided to build a larger sports facility, also to serve the military of the Mussolini barracks and the students of the National Physical Education School of Milizia Volontaria per la Sicurezza Nazionale (MVSN) for premilitary instructors and sportmen. The school managed to train about 2,000 instructors a year, reaching its peak in 1934 with almost 5,000 graduates.

In the 1928–1929 season, the U.S. Mirandolese team reached the first place in group E of the Second Division on equal terms with GS Farini, who was beaten (2-0) in the play-off played in Mantua on 9 June 1929. The victory allowed Mirandolese to play in the Prima Divisione for 3 years. In 1929 construction work began on the spectator stand, designed by architect Mario Guerzoni (1884-1956) and inaugurated in 1930.

Among Mirandola's footballers who played on the field of the Lolli Stadium are to be remembered: Oreste Benatti (Bighina), Mario Castorri (Bacic), Libero and Nino Lolli, Evaristo Malavasi (Beg), Emilio Furlani (Milietto), Gianni Cappi, Silvano Bottecchi (Spinon), Fermo Benatti, Nando Paltrinieri, Antonio Marchetti, Livio Luppi, Nunzio Cavazza, Ilario Righini, Marco Marchetti, Mauro Muracchini and Roberto Razzaboni.

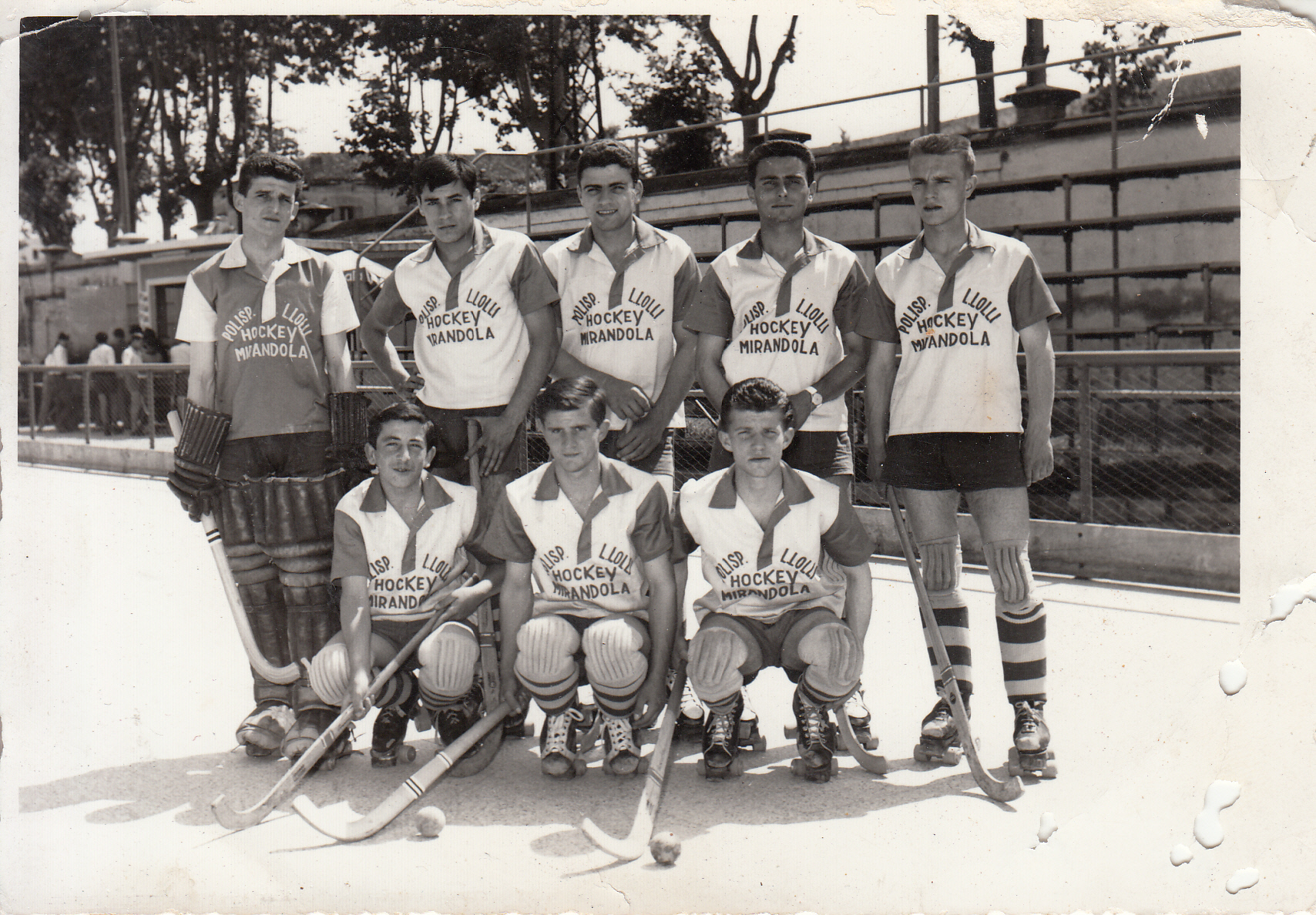
Polisportiva Lolli roller hockey team on the rink next to the football field (1958)

Inside the sports area, in 1954 a skating rink was built next to the grandstand on which the Polisportiva Giovanni Pico roller hockey team competed for many years.

In May 2012 the historical building of the stands and the surrounding wall were damaged by the earthquake in Emilia. In November 2012, temporary changing rooms were set up and the "Coverciano grandstand" was repaired. 347 donations were received from private citizens for a total of €55,489.66 for the restoration of the stadium.

In 2017 the municipal administration announced the disposal of the Lolli stadium, whose grassy land will be used for the construction of new flats and shops. In addition, the grandstand (bound by the Superintendence of Cultural Heritage as a historic building) will be refurbished to serve a public garden.

== Bibliography ==
- Alberto Bombarda; Massimo Bruno (2012). Un secolo di calcio a Mirandola.

== Filmography ==
- Teruzzi in visita alla Scuola Ufficiali Benito Mussolini on YouTube

== See also ==
- Unione Sportiva Mirandolese
