= Derby delle Isole =

Italian Serie A and Serie B derby

- Location: Sardinia; Sicily
- Teams: Cagliari Calcio; Palermo
- First meeting: Palermo 1–0 Cagliari (27 October 1929); 1929–30 Prima Divisione
- Latest meeting: Cagliari 2–1 Palermo (12 August 2023); Coppa Italia
- Stadiums: Sardegna Arena (Cagliari); La Favorita (Palermo)

Statistics
- Total meetings: 68
- Most player appearances: Daniele Conti (23)
- Top scorer: David Suazo (4)
- All-time record: Cagliari: 30; Draw: 23; Palermo: 15

The Derby delle Isole ("Derby of the Islands") is an Italian association football rivalry between Cagliari Calcio and Palermo. Cagliari Calcio play at Unipol Domus, in Cagliari, Sardinia, while Palermo play at La Favorita in Palermo, Sicily; the two grounds are approximately 250 mi (402.34 km) apart.

The teams have played 68competitive matches in all competitions since 1929.

== Head-to-head ==
The teams have played 28 matches in Serie A, 30 matches in Serie B, 6 matches in Coppa Italia and 4 matches in Serie C.

=== Statistics ===
| Competition | Played | Cagliari wins | Draws | Palermo wins | Cagliari goals | Palermo goals |
|---|---|---|---|---|---|---|
| Serie A | 28 | 11 | 8 | 9 | 35 | 35 |
| Serie B | 30 | 12 | 13 | 5 | 39 | 31 |
| Coppa Italia | 6 | 4 | 2 | 0 | 13 | 6 |
| Serie C | 4 | 2 | 1 | 1 | 4 | 3 |
| Total | 68 | 29 | 24 | 15 | 91 | 75 |

=== Full list of results ===
Fixtures from 1968 to 2019 featuring League games and Coppa Italia.

League

| # | Season | Date | Competition | Home Team | Result | Away Team | Stadium | Attendance | H2H |
|---|---|---|---|---|---|---|---|---|---|
| 1 | 1968–69 | 29 September 1968 | Serie A | Cagliari | 3–0 | Palermo | Stadio Amsicora | 28,000 | +1 |
| 2 | 1968–69 | 2 February 1969 | Serie A | Palermo | 0–0 | Cagliari | La Favorita | – | +1 |
| 3 | 1969–70 | 14 December 1969 | Serie A | Palermo | 1–0 | Cagliari | La Favorita | – | 0 |
| 4 | 1969–70 | 5 April 1970 | Serie A | Cagliari | 2–0 | Palermo | Stadio Amsicora | – | +1 |
| 5 | 1972–73 | 15 October 1972 | Serie A | Cagliari | 2–0 | Palermo | Stadio Sant'Elia | – | +2 |
| 6 | 1972–73 | 11 February 1973 | Serie A | Palermo | 0–1 | Cagliari | Stadio Cibali | – | +3 |
| 7 | 2001–02 | 3 September 2001 | Serie B | Palermo | 0–0 | Cagliari | La Favorita | 21,446 | +3 |
| 8 | 2001–02 | 20 January 2002 | Serie B | Cagliari | 4–0 | Palermo | Stadio Sant'Elia | – | +4 |
| 9 | 2002–03 | 26 October 2002 | Serie B | Palermo | 1–1 | Cagliari | Stadio Renzo Barbera | 25,443 | +4 |
| 10 | 2002–03 | 30 March 2003 | Serie B | Cagliari | 2–2 | Palermo | Stadio Sant'Elia | 8,000 | +4 |
| 11 | 2003–04 | 14 September 2003 | Serie B | Palermo | 1–0 | Cagliari | Stadio Renzo Barbera | 26,576 | +3 |
| 12 | 2003–04 | 15 February 2004 | Serie B | Cagliari | 3–2 | Palermo | Stadio Sant'Elia | 18,000 | +4 |
| 13 | 2004–05 | 19 December 2004 | Serie A | Palermo | 3–0 | Cagliari | Stadio Renzo Barbera | 32,927 | +3 |
| 14 | 2004–05 | 8 May 2005 | Serie A | Cagliari | 0–0 | Palermo | Stadio Sant'Elia | 13,000 | +3 |
| 15 | 2005–06 | 4 December 2005 | Serie A | Palermo | 2–2 | Cagliari | Stadio Renzo Barbera | 27,000 | +3 |
| 16 | 2005–06 | 9 April 2006 | Serie A | Cagliari | 1–1 | Palermo | Stadio Sant'Elia | 10,000 | +3 |
| 17 | 2006–07 | 18 November 2006 | Serie A | Cagliari | 1–0 | Palermo | Stadio Sant'Elia | 12,000 | +4 |
| 18 | 2006–07 | 7 April 2007 | Serie A | Palermo | 1–3 | Cagliari | Stadio Renzo Barbera | 21,655 | +5 |
| 19 | 2007–08 | 23 September 2007 | Serie A | Cagliari | 0–1 | Palermo | Stadio Sant'Elia | 10,000 | +4 |
| 20 | 2007–08 | 17 February 2008 | Serie A | Palermo | 2–1 | Cagliari | Stadio Renzo Barbera | 21,829 | +3 |
| 21 | 2008–09 | 7 December 2008 | Serie A | Cagliari | 1–0 | Palermo | Stadio Sant'Elia | 12,000 | +4 |
| 22 | 2008–09 | 3 May 2009 | Serie A | Palermo | 5–1 | Cagliari | Stadio Renzo Barbera | 27,847 | +3 |
| 23 | 2009–10 | 6 December 2009 | Serie A | Palermo | 2–1 | Cagliari | Stadio Renzo Barbera | 18,693 | +2 |
| 24 | 2009–10 | 18 April 2010 | Serie A | Cagliari | 2–2 | Palermo | Stadio Sant'Elia | 10,000 | +2 |
| 25 | 2010–11 | 29 August 2010 | Serie A | Palermo | 0–0 | Cagliari | Stadio Renzo Barbera | 28,612 | +2 |
| 26 | 2010–11 | 16 January 2011 | Serie A | Cagliari | 3–1 | Palermo | Stadio Sant'Elia | 8,000 | +3 |
| 27 | 2011–12 | 21 September 2011 | Serie A | Palermo | 3–2 | Cagliari | Stadio Renzo Barbera | 18,965 | +2 |
| 28 | 2011–12 | 11 February 2012 | Serie A | Cagliari | 2–1 | Palermo | Stadio Sant'Elia | 6,000 | +3 |
| 29 | 2012–13 | 15 September 2012 | Serie A | Palermo | 1–1 | Cagliari | Stadio Renzo Barbera | 12,625 | +3 |
| 30 | 2012–13 | 27 January 2013 | Serie A | Cagliari | 1–1 | Palermo | Stadio Is Arenas | 10,000 | +3 |
| 31 | 2014–15 | 6 January 2015 | Serie A | Palermo | 5–0 | Cagliari | Stadio Renzo Barbera | 18,268 | +2 |
| 32 | 2014–15 | 17 May 2015 | Serie A | Cagliari | 0–1 | Palermo | Stadio Sant'Elia | 6,000 | +1 |
| 33 | 2016–17 | 31 October 2016 | Serie A | Cagliari | 2–1 | Palermo | Stadio Sant'Elia | 14,625 | +2 |
| 34 | 2016–17 | 2 April 2017 | Serie A | Palermo | 1–3 | Cagliari | Stadio Renzo Barbera | 11,938 | +3 |
| 35 | 2022–23 | 18 December 2022 | Serie B | Palermo | 2–1 | Cagliari | Stadio Renzo Barbera | 16,812 | +2 |
| 36 | 2022–23 | 13 May 2017 | Serie B | Cagliari | 2–1 | Palermo | Stadio Sant'Elia | 15,502 | +3 |

Cup

| # | Season | Date | Competition | Home Team | Result | Away Team | Stadium | Attendance | Round |
|---|---|---|---|---|---|---|---|---|---|
| 1 | 2017–18 | 12 August 2017 | Coppa Italia | Cagliari | 1–1 (Note: Cagliari won 4–2 on penalties.) | Palermo | Stadio Olimpico Grande Torino | 1,126 | Third round |
| 2 | 2018–19 | 12 August 2018 | Coppa Italia | Cagliari | 2–1 | Palermo | Sardegna Arena | 7,000 | Third round |
| 3 | 2023–24 | 12 August 2023 | Coppa Italia | Cagliari | 2–1 (a.e.t.) | Palermo | Unipol Domus | 14,917 | First round |

== Records ==
=== All-time top goalscorers ===
Players in bold are still active in the derby.

| Rank | Nation | Player | Club(s) | Years | League | Coppa Italia | Overall |
|---|---|---|---|---|---|---|---|
| 1 | (Italy) | Luigi Riva | Cagliari | 1963–1977 | 4 | 1 | 5 |
| 1 | (Italy) | Luigi Piras | Cagliari | 1973–1987 | 4 | 1 | 5 |
| 2 | (Honduras) | David Suazo | Cagliari | 1999–2007 | 4 | 0 | 4 |
| 3 | (Italy) | Daniele Dessena | Cagliari | 2009–2010, 2012–2019 | 3 | 0 | 3 |
| 3 | (Italy) | Fabrizio Miccoli | Palermo | 2007–2013 | 3 | 0 | 3 |
| 3 | (Italy) | **Leonardo Pavoletti** | Cagliari | 2017–2018, 2018–present | 1 | 2 | 3 |

=== All-time most appearances ===
Players in bold are still active in the derby.

| Rank | Nation | Player | Club(s) | Years | League | Coppa Italia | Overall |
|---|---|---|---|---|---|---|---|
| 1 | (Italy) | Daniele Conti | Cagliari | 1999–2015 | 23 | 0 | 23 |
| 2 | (Italy) | Alessandro Agostini | Cagliari | 2004, 2004–2012 | 14 | 0 | 14 |
| 3 | (Italy) | Francesco Pisano | Cagliari | 2004–2015 | 13 | 0 | 13 |
| 4 | (Italy) | Andrea Cossu | Cagliari | 2005–2006, 2008–2015, 2017–2018 | 10 | 1 | 11 |
| 4 | (Uruguay) | Diego López | Cagliari | 1998–2010 | 11 | 0 | 11 |
| 6 | (Honduras) | David Suazo | Cagliari | 1999–2007 | 10 | 0 | 10 |
| 6 | (Italy) | Mauro Esposito | Cagliari | 2001–2007 | 10 | 0 | 10 |
| 6 | (Italy) | Mattia Cassani | Palermo | 2006–2011 | 10 | 0 | 10 |

=== Results ===
==== Biggest wins (5+ goals) ====
| Winning margin | Result | Date | Competition |
|---|---|---|---|
| **5** | **Palermo** 5–0 Cagliari | 6 January 2015 | 2014–15 Serie A |

==== Most total goals in a match ====
| Goals | Result | Date | Competition |
|---|---|---|---|
| **6** | **Palermo** 5–1 Cagliari | 3 May 2009 | 2008–09 Serie A |
| | **Palermo** 4–2 Cagliari | 1 May 1932 | 1931–32 Serie B |
| **5** | **Palermo** 3–2 Cagliari | 21 September 2011 | 2011–12 Serie A |
| **5** | **Palermo** 5–0 Cagliari | 6 January 2015 | 2014–15 Serie A |

=== Honours ===
| Cagliari | Competition | Palermo |
National
| **1** | Serie A | — |
| 1 | Serie B | **5** |
| 4 | Serie C/Serie C1/Serie C2 | **5** |
| **6** | Prima Divisione (defunct) | 1 |
| 1 | Coppa Italia Serie C | 1 |
| 13 | Total | 12 |
