= Oreste Benatti =

Italian footballer (1906–?)

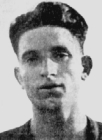
- Benatti circa 1920

Personal information
- Date of birth: 11 June 1906
- Place of birth: Mirandola, Italy
- Position: Forward

Senior career*
Years	Team	Apps	(Gls)
1926–1927	Mirandolese		
1927–1928	Reggiana	20	(4)
1928–1930	Roma	60	(12)
1930–1931	Lecce	34	(11)
1931–1934	Napoli	64	(6)
1934	Spezia	2	(0)
1934	Trento		
1934–1936	Bagnolese		
- * Club domestic league appearances and goals

Oreste Benatti (born 11 June 1906) was an Italian footballer who played as a forward, usually as a winger, although he was also capable of playing as a striker. Known in particular for his speed, offensive movement, quick feet, technical ability, dribbling skills, and consistency as a footballer, he spent four seasons in the Italian Serie A, with A.S. Roma and S.S.C. Napoli, scoring 16 goals in 94 games.

== Career ==
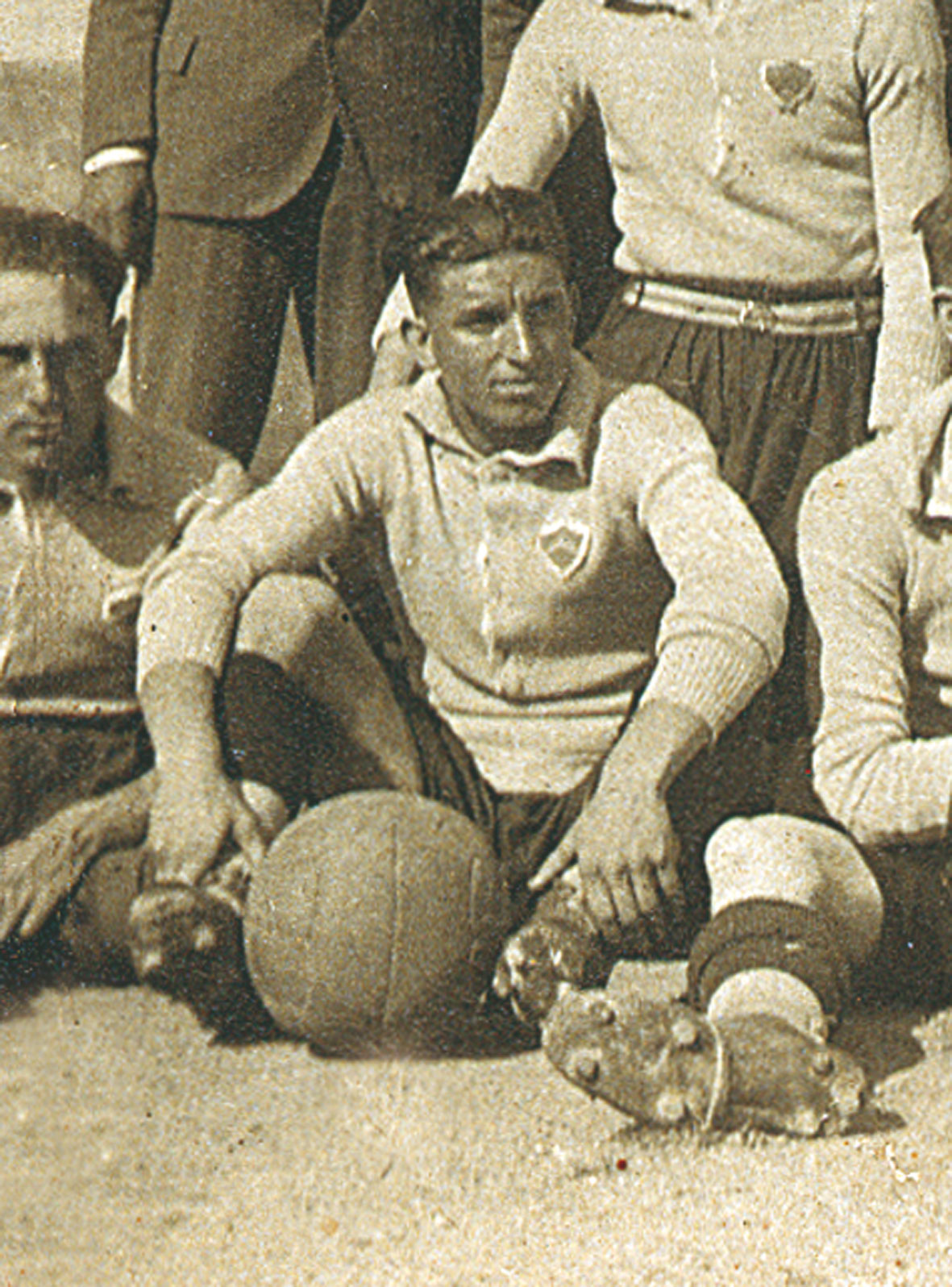
Oreste Benatti (1926)

Benatti was born in Mirandola. He began his career with Reggiana in 1927 in the Divisione Nazionale, the Italian First Division at the time, before moving to Roma the following season, where he remained for two seasons in total. He made his debut in the Serie A with Roma on 6 October 1929, in a 3–1 defeat to Alessandria. He played for Lecce in Serie B during the 1930–31 season, before moving to Napoli for the next three seasons. He also played for Spezia and Trento before joining Bagnolese in the Italian lower divisions for the final two seasons of his career, retiring from professional football in 1936.
