= US Mirandolese =

Italian football club

Mirandolese
- Full name: Unione Sportiva Mirandolese
- Founded: 1920
- Dissolved: 2005
- Ground: Libero Lolli stadium Mirandola, Italy
- Capacity: 400
- Coordinates: 44°53′18″N 11°04′12″E
Home colours	Away colours

Unione Sportiva Mirandolese was an Italian football club based in the city of Mirandola, in the province of Modena, Italy.

== History ==
The history of football in Mirandola began on 15 March 1911, when the 'Foot-Ball Club Giovanni Pico' was founded, which asked the municipal council for the concession of a plot of land of about 3 biolche, equivalent to 9,000 square metres (11,000 sq yd), located in the 9th Spalti trunk in order to build a sports field. However, the land was leased, so the first pitch was built on the side of the western ring road. This first football experience ended with the outbreak of the World War I.

U.S. Mirandolese was founded in 1920. In the 1928–1929 season, it reached the first place in the Second Division group E on a par with G.S. Farini, who was beaten (2–0) in the playoff game played in Mantua on 9 June 1929: this victory allowed U.S. Mirandolese to play in the Prima Divisione the next 1929-30 season. The team remained in the Prima Divisione also in 1930-31 and 1931-32 seasons.

After WWII, Mirandolese played 3 years in Serie C (Lega Nazionale Alta Italia). After returning to the regional division for a few decades, U.S. Mirandolese won the Promozione in the 1956–57 season and entered Serie D, where it played for twelve consecutive seasons.

Mirandolese was most successful at the regional level in the 1980s. After winning the Regional Promotion Championship 1978–1979, the team remained in the Interregional Championship for ten consecutive years, often finishing near the top of the ranking.

The double relegation in 1991 marked the beginning of the collapse that awaited Mirandolese in the following years. Since the 1990s, Mirandolese mainly played in the Prima Categoria, with some appearances in Promozione and Eccellenza. Mirandolese folded in 2005.

Notable local footballers who played in US Mirandolese: Oreste Benatti (Bighina), Mario Castorri (Bacic), Libero and Nino Lolli, Evaristo Malavasi. (Beg), Emilio Furlani. (Milietto), Gianni Cappi, Silvano Bottecchi. (Spinon), Fermo Benatti, Nando Paltrinieri, Antonio Marchetti, Livio Luppi, Nunzio Cavazza, Ilario Righini, Marco Marchetti, Mauro Muracchini and Roberto Razzaboni.

== Colors ==
The colors of U.S. Mirandolese were yellow and blue. The first shirt was in vertical yellow-blue stripes with blue shorts. The second shirt was almost entirely white with yellow-blue lapels.

== Bibliography ==
- Alberto Bombarda; Massimo Bruno (2012). Un secolo di calcio a Mirandola.

== See also ==
- Libero Lolli stadium
