= 1931–32 Serie B =

Italian football league season

Serie B
- Season: 1931–32
- Champions: Palermo; 1st title

Serie B 1931-32 team distribution

The 1931–32 Serie B was the third tournament of this competition played in Italy since its creation.

== Teams ==
Como, Vigevano and Cagliari had been promoted from Prima Divisione, while Livorno and Legnano had been relegated from Serie A.

== Final classification ==
Pos	Team	Pld	W	D	L	GF	GA	GD	Pts	Promotion or relegation
1	Palermo (P, C)	34	21	8	5	80	35	+45	50	Promotion to Serie A
2	Padova (P)	34	19	9	6	79	26	+53	47	Promotion to Serie A
3	Verona	34	17	7	10	61	50	+11	41	
4	Atalanta	34	13	13	8	57	42	+15	39	
4	Vigevanesi	34	16	7	11	57	46	+11	39	
6	Cremonese	34	13	11	10	43	43	0	37	
7	Spezia	34	13	10	11	53	36	+17	36	
7	Livorno	34	13	10	11	54	43	+11	36	
9	Comense	34	13	9	12	47	49	−2	35	
9	Monfalcone	34	13	9	12	42	50	−8	35	
11	Pistoiese	34	13	8	13	49	50	−1	34	
11	Legnano	34	14	6	14	50	54	−4	34	
13	Cagliari (Note: 1 point deducted.)	34	12	8	14	41	38	+3	31	
14	Serenissima Venezia	34	10	10	14	43	56	−13	30	
14	Novara	34	12	6	16	40	54	−14	30	
16	Udinese (R)	34	9	7	18	43	66	−23	25	Relegation to Prima Divisione
17	Lecce (Note: 2 points deducted for financial problems. Lecce was later re-founded in 1934 with a completely new team, and it was restored in Serie C in 1936.) (R, E)	34	8	7	19	23	51	−28	21	Bankruptcy
18	Parma (R)	34	3	3	28	25	98	−73	9	Relegation to Prima Divisione

Source: Panini
(C) Champions; (E) Eliminated; (P) Promoted; (R) Relegated

== Results ==
Home \ Away	ATA	CAG	COM	CRE	LCE	LEG	LIV	MFA	NOV	PAD	PAL	PAR	PST	SEV	SPE	UDI	HEL	VIG
Atalanta		6–4	1–1	3–0	2–0	1–2	0–0	0–0	2–0	1–0	0–0	7–0	3–1	1–1	1–1	7–0	2–0	2–0
Cagliari	3–0		2–2	3–0	0–0	0–1	1–1	2–0	3–0	0–2	2–1	2–0	3–1	2–1	0–0	0–0	0–2	2–1
Comense	2–0	2–1		0–0	2–0	0–0	4–0	0–0	2–0	0–0	0–4	4–3	2–1	0–0	2–0	2–2	0–3	2–1
Cremonese	2–1	1–0	3–1		1–0	1–2	1–1	1–1	1–4	1–4	2–0	1–0	6–0	1–0	0–0	6–1	0–0	2–1
Lecce	0–0	0–2	3–2	1–1		0–2	0–2	4–0	1–0	0–1	1–2	1–0	0–2	1–0	1–1	2–1	2–0	2–1
Legnano	1–1	3–2	1–1	2–1	2–1		1–1	0–1	2–1	1–1	1–2	3–1	2–3	2–0	2–1	2–0	1–3	1–2
Livorno	2–0	0–2	3–2	2–3	4–0	2–1		5–0	4–0	2–0	1–1	5–0	0–0	1–1	1–0	3–0	0–1	5–1
Monfalcone	2–3	1–1	2–3	0–2	4–0	2–0	3–1		7–0	3–1	2–0	2–1	1–1	0–0	2–1	1–0	3–0	0–2
Novara	2–2	1–0	0–1	0–0	0–0	2–0	2–0	2–0		2–2	2–5	3–0	1–0	3–0	2–0	2–1	1–3	0–0
Padova	7–0	2–0	1–0	1–1	2–1	1–1	4–1	4–0	4–0		2–2	6–0	4–0	4–1	2–0	6–2	6–0	0–0
Palermo	5–1	4–1	5–0	2–1	3–1	4–2	1–1	0–1	4–1	0–0		6–0	4–1	3–1	1–1	4–1	3–1	4–0
Parma	1–1	0–1	1–3	5–0	0–0	2–1	0–1	1–4	0–4	1–7	0–2		0–2	0–2	0–2	2–5	3–0	1–1
Pistoiese	0–0	2–1	1–0	1–1	4–0	1–3	2–2	5–0	2–0	0–2	1–1	3–0		4–2	3–1	1–0	3–3	0–1
Serenissima V.	0–2	1–0	1–0	0–0	2–1	5–2	2–2	0–0	2–1	1–2	1–2	4–1	2–1		2–1	2–4	1–1	0–0
Spezia	2–2	1–1	5–3	2–0	2–0	5–2	2–0	0–0	2–0	2–0	1–2	1–0	1–1	4–0		2–0	4–0	5–1
Udinese	3–2	1–0	0–1	0–1	0–0	1–2	1–0	0–0	1–2	1–1	1–1	3–0	1–2	1–4	1–0		3–5	5–1
Hellas Verona	0–3	0–0	2–1	1–1	3–0	2–1	6–1	7–0	2–2	1–0	1–2	2–0	1–0	5–0	2–1	2–2		2–1
Vigevanesi	0–0	1–0	3–2	4–1	3–0	3–1	1–0	3–0	1–0	1–0	3–0	9–2	2–0	4–4	2–2	0–1	3–0	

Source: Almanacco Illustrato del Calcio - La Storia 1898-2004, Panini Edizioni, Modena, September 2005 (in Italian)
Legend: Blue = home team win; Yellow = draw; Red = away team win.
