= 1930–31 Serie B =

Italian football league season

Serie B
- Season: 1930–31
- Champions: Fiorentina; 1st title

Serie B 1930-31 team distribution

The 1930–31 Serie B was the second tournament of this competition played in Italy since its creation.

== Teams ==
Derthona, Lucchese, Udinese and Palermo had been promoted from Prima Divisione, while Cremonese and Padova had been relegated from Serie A.

== Events ==
Following a reform of the third division, the relegations were reduced from four to three.

== Final classification ==
Pos	Team	Pld	W	D	L	GF	GA	GD	Pts	Promotion or relegation
1	Fiorentina (P, C)	34	18	10	6	54	27	+27	46	Promotion to Serie A
2	Bari (P)	34	18	10	6	57	33	+24	46	Promotion to Serie A
3	Palermo	34	18	8	8	54	31	+23	44	
4	Padova	34	18	7	9	77	51	+26	43	
5	Verona	34	19	4	11	68	43	+25	42	
6	Atalanta	34	15	11	8	62	35	+27	41	
7	Cremonese	34	16	9	9	68	46	+22	41	
8	Novara (Note: 1 point deducted.)	34	17	5	12	52	48	+4	38	
9	Serenissima Venezia	34	13	10	11	49	50	−1	36	
10	Pistoiese	34	14	7	13	54	42	+12	35	
11	Monfalcone	34	9	10	15	34	51	−17	28	
12	Spezia	34	10	8	16	35	54	−19	28	
13	Parma	34	10	7	17	45	64	−19	27	
14	Lecce	34	10	6	18	44	53	−9	26	
15	Udinese	34	7	11	16	58	78	−20	25	Relegation tie-breaker
16	Lucchese (R)	34	9	7	18	33	70	−37	25	Prima Divisione after tie-breaker
17	Derthona (R)	34	7	7	20	43	65	−22	21	Relegation to Prima Divisione
18	Liguria (Note: They became Sampierdarenese after the end of this season.) (R)	34	6	7	21	33	79	−46	19	Relegation to Prima Divisione

Source: Panini
(C) Champions; (P) Promoted; (R) Relegated

== Results ==
Home \ Away	ATA	BAR	CRE	DER	FIO	LCE	LIG	LUC	MFA	NOV	PAD	PAL	PAR	PST	SEV	SPE	UDI	HEL
Atalanta		0–1	4–2	1–3	0–0	5–0	2–0	2–0	1–1	2–0	5–2	3–0	0–0	2–0	1–1	2–0	3–3	3–1
Bari	0–0		4–1	2–0	2–2	1–0	5–0	2–1	3–1	2–0	0–1	2–1	2–0	2–1	4–1	1–0	7–0	3–1
Cremonese	2–2	2–2		2–0	0–0	3–1	4–1	5–1	5–0	0–0	1–1	0–0	4–2	4–2	2–1	2–2	4–1	4–0
Derthona	1–3	0–0	1–2		1–1	5–2	1–1	3–0	2–0	2–1	1–2	1–1	5–1	1–4	2–1	0–1	2–2	1–2
Fiorentina	1–0	4–0	3–1	2–0		2–1	1–0	1–1	4–1	1–2	1–0	1–0	5–0	1–1	2–0	2–0	3–2	2–0
Lecce	1–0	0–1	0–1	3–1	1–0		3–1	1–1	1–0	6–0	1–2	0–0	1–2	1–1	2–3	4–2	3–1	0–0
Liguria	0–4	1–0	0–2	4–3	1–1	1–3		1–1	4–2	1–2	0–2	3–2	0–2	0–1	1–1	2–2	4–2	1–2
Lucchese	1–1	0–0	1–4	1–0	0–3	1–0	0–1		1–0	1–2	3–3	0–2	4–0	1–0	1–1	3–0	3–0	2–0
Monfalcone	2–4	5–3	2–1	1–0	2–1	2–0	1–1	0–1		2–0	1–4	0–0	0–0	0–1	0–0	2–0	1–1	1–0
Novara	2–0	1–2	2–1	3–1	1–0	4–2	2–0	4–0	0–0		2–0	2–1	3–1	0–2	0–0	2–1	6–2	3–2
Padova	3–2	0–0	4–2	6–2	1–2	1–0	4–0	4–0	2–2	6–2		3–1	2–2	2–1	2–0	4–1	4–1	4–0
Palermo	1–1	0–0	3–1	4–1	2–0	1–0	6–0	6–1	3–1	1–0	1–0		2–1	1–0	3–1	1–0	2–1	3–0
Parma	0–0	0–1	0–1	4–0	1–3	3–2	2–0	5–2	1–0	0–1	2–0	0–0		4–2	4–1	0–1	0–0	2–5
Pistoiese	2–4	1–0	1–1	1–0	0–0	0–0	3–1	4–0	0–0	3–1	2–0	1–2	6–2		0–2	4–1	4–2	2–0
Serenissima V.	1–3	1–1	2–1	0–0	2–2	2–2	4–1	1–0	2–3	1–0	5–1	2–1	1–1	2–1		2–1	2–1	4–0
Spezia	1–0	2–2	1–2	1–0	1–1	0–2	2–1	2–0	0–0	2–2	1–1	1–1	3–1	2–1	0–2		2–0	0–1
Udinese	3–2	2–2	1–1	2–2	1–2	3–1	1–1	7–1	4–1	1–1	5–4	0–1	3–2	1–1	2–0	1–2		1–3
Hellas Verona	0–0	4–0	1–0	4–1	2–0	3–0	6–1	5–0	1–0	2–1	2–2	4–1	4–0	2–1	5–0	5–0	1–1	

Source: Almanacco Illustrato del Calcio - La Storia 1898-2004, Panini Edizioni, Modena, September 2005 (in Italian)
Legend: Blue = home team win; Yellow = draw; Red = away team win.

== Relegation tie-breaker ==
Played in Bologna, 12 July 1931

Team 1	Score	Team 2
Udinese	7-0	Lucchese

Lucchese were relegated to Prima Divisione.
