= Faenza Calcio =

Italian football club

- Founded: 1912
- Ground: Comunale Bruno Neri
- Capacity: 2,800
- Head coach: (Italy) Alberto Fiorentini
- League: Eccellenza
- Website: http://www.faenzacalcio.it/
Home colours	Away colours

Faenza Calcio is an Italian professional football team based in Faenza. The team is a member of the Eccellenza.

== Current squad ==
2016/17 squad

Note: Flags indicate national team as defined under FIFA eligibility rules; some limited exceptions apply. Players may hold more than one non-FIFA nationality.

No.	Pos.	Nation	Player
—	GK	(Italy) ITA	Alessandro Lega
—	GK	(Italy) ITA	Federico Bentivoglio
—	GK	(Italy) ITA	Simone Lusa
—	GK	(Italy) ITA	Edoardo Tassinari
—	DF	(Italy) ITA	Matteo Piraccini
—	DF	(Italy) ITA	Filippo Pezzi
—	DF	(Italy) ITA	Denis Melandri
—	DF	(Italy) ITA	Francesco Lanzoni
—	DF	(Italy) ITA	Nicola Giorgi
—	DF	(Italy) ITA	Marco Gavelli
—	DF	(Italy) ITA	Diego Franceschini
—	DF	(Italy) ITA	Manuel Calamini

No.	Pos.	Nation	Player
—	MF	(Italy) ITA	Filippo Bentini
—	MF	(Italy) ITA	Federico Amerighi
—	MF	(Italy) ITA	Victor Teleman
—	MF	(Italy) ITA	Stefano Savioni
—	MF	(Italy) ITA	Daniele Mordini
—	MF	(Italy) ITA	Lorenzo Franceschini
—	MF	(Italy) ITA	Simone Errani
—	MF	(Italy) ITA	Nicolò Dalmonte
—	FW	(Italy) ITA	Matteo Negrini
—	FW	(Italy) ITA	Alberto Poggiolini
—	FW	(Italy) ITA	Marco Fontana
—	FW	(Italy) ITA	Mattia Nicolini
