= AC Crema 1908 =

Italian football club

Crema
- Full name: Associazione Calcio Crema; 1908
- Founded: 1908; 118 years ago
- Ground: Stadio Giuseppe Voltini, Crema, Italy
- Capacity: 4,095
- Chairman: Enrico Zucchi
- Manager: Michele Piccolo
- League: Serie D
- 2025–26: Serie D/D, 10th
Home colours	Away colours

Associazione Calcio Crema 1908 is an Italian association football club located in Crema, Lombardy. It currently plays in Serie D Group D. Its colors are black and white.

The club took part in two Serie B seasons immediately after the second World War, led by world champion Renato Olmi.

In early 2025 the club had a new group of owners from Finland.
