= USD Rivarolese 1906 =

Italian football club

Rivarolese
- Full name: Unione Sportiva Dilettantistica Rivarolese 1906
- Founded: 1906
- Dissolved: 2009 (merged with Chieri)
- Ground: Centro Polisportivo, Rivarolo Canavese, Italy
- 2008–09: Serie D/A, 13th (fold)
Home colours	Away colours

Unione Sportiva Dilettantistica Rivarolese 1906 was an Italian association football club located in Rivarolo Canavese, Piedmont. It last played in Serie D. Its colors were maroon, white and black, and it was founded in 1906.

Rivarolese was promoted from Regional Eccellenza league in 2005/2006, after having won its round. In 2009 it was merged with Chieri of Piedmont (which finished 13th in 2008–09 Eccellenza Piedmont A) and transferred to Chieri.

The side is not to be confused with another Rivarolese, which played in the Italian Championship first league between the first and second World Wars: that team was based in Rivarolo Ligure, a suburb of Genoa.
