= FS Sestrese Calcio 1919 =

Italian football club

Sestrese
- Full name: Fratellanza Sportiva Sestrese Calcio 1919
- Founded: 1919; 106 years ago
- Ground: Stadio Giuseppe Piccardo, Genoa, Italy
- Chairman: Sebastiano Sciortino
- Manager: Cristiano Rossetti
- League: Eccellenza Liguria
- 2022–23: Eccellenza Liguria, 16th
- Website: http://sestresecalcio.com
Home colours	Away colours

Fratellanza Sportiva Sestrese Calcio 1919 (in English Fratellanza means Brotherhood) is an Italian football club located in Sestri Ponente, a suburb of Genoa, Liguria. It currently plays in Eccellenza Liguria, having last been in Serie B of Northern Italy in 1947.

== Colors and badge ==
Its colors are green and white.

== Honours ==
In 1991 Sestrese won the Coppa Italia Dilettanti di Eccellenza.

During the first half of the 20th century Fratellanza Sportiva also had a Tamburello team, which won the national title ("Campione d'Italia") in 1927, 1928, 1929, 1948 and 1949.

== Famous former coaches ==
- (Italy) Dario Bonetti
- (Hungary) Ferenc Hirzer
