= ASD HSL Derthona =

Italian association football club

Derthona
- Full name: Associazione Sportiva Dilettantistica HSL Derthona
- Founded: 1908; 118 years ago
- Ground: Stadio Fausto Coppi, Tortona, Italy
- Capacity: 2,700
- Chairman: Fabio Toso
- Manager: Giovanni Zichella
- League: Serie D/A
- 2025–26: Serie D/A, 14th
Home colours	Away colours

Associazione Sportiva Dilettantistica HSL Derthona, also known as Derthona, is a football club based in Tortona, Piedmont, Italy. Derthona currently plays in Serie D.
