= ASD AVC Vogherese 1919 =

Italian football club

Vogherese
- Full name: Associazione Sportiva Dilettantistica AVC Vogherese 1919
- Nicknames: Rossoneri (the red&blacks), AVC
- Founded: 1919; 1959, 2015, 2019 (refounded)
- Ground: Stadio Comunale Giovanni Parisi, Voghera
- Capacity: 4,000
- Chairman: Oreste Cavaliere
- Manager: Andrea Macchetti
- League: Serie D Girone B
- 2023–24: 14th
Home colours	Away colours

Associazione Sportiva Dilettantistica AVC Vogherese 1919 (briefly Vogherese or Voghera) is an Italian football club, based in the town Voghera, Lombardy that plays in Serie D. It plays at Voghera's Stadio Comunale Giovanni Parisi, with a capacity of 4,000 seats. The team colors (e.g. uniforms and badge) are red and black, as is its nickname "Rossoneri" (literally "the red and blacks").

== Foundation ==
Historic badge

Associazione Vogherese Calcio was founded on 26 November 1919 at the Trattoria Pistone.

After a dozen championships between second and first division, in 1930 Vogherese lost the playoff for promotion to Serie B in Piacenza for three goals to two.

In 1932, the Italy national team played a winning friendly in Voghera, by six to two.

In the late 1930s until 1942 the Vogherese were called V.I.S.A. Voghera, only to return to A.V.C. Vogherese in championship 1942–43.

Between 1945 and 1948 was the peak for football in Voghera with three consecutive seasons in Serie B. Then the relegation to Serie C in the 1950s, in 1959 the company experienced a severe financial crisis that led to the cessation of sport.

== Refoundation ==
To continue the football tradition of A.C. Voghera, the Associazione Ragazzi Cairoli, founded in 1948 took the place of Vogherese, recovering only in 1994 the name of the bankrupt company, competing in amateur tournaments Lombard until its return to Serie D.

At the end of the 1980–81 season it was promoted to the Serie C2, remaining so until the 1987–88 season.

Demoted in Serie D, the team would still play between this league and Serie C2: it was relegated from C2 at the end of the 1998–99 season.

Although the team finished the season in third place and managed to win the playoffs, it was not enough to get the repechage to Serie C2.

In the 2010–11 season, Voghera gained access to the Serie D promotion play-off, advancing through the group stage to the semifinals, where it was eliminated by Rimini.

=== Liquidation and following refoundations ===
In summer 2013, the club was not able to enter 2013–14 Serie D and so was subsequently liquidated.

The first attempt to re-start the activity took place in 2015, when three football clubs based in Voghera (Nord Voghera, Torrevillese and Orione) united in a new company called Associazione Sportiva Dilettantistica Voghera, which joined the Prima Categoria in 2015-2016 and was promoted to Promozione in 2017–2018. However, just one year later, the club again filed for bankruptcy, withdrawing from the championship in winter 2018.

After some months, businessman Oreste Cavaliere took over A.S.D. OltrepòVoghera (another club based in Voghera, playing its football in Eccellenza), renaming it Associazione Sportiva Dilettantistica AVC Vogherese 1919 and re-starting the "rossoneri" history.
