= AS Pro Gorizia =

Association football club in Italy

Pro Gorizia
- Full name: Associazione Sportiva Dilettantistica Pro Gorizia
- Founded: 1923; 103 years ago
- Ground: Stadio Campagnuzza, Gorizia, Italy
- Capacity: 1,000
- Manager: Fabio Franti
- League: Eccellenza
- Website: progorizia.altervista.org
Home colours	Away colours

Associazione Sportiva Dilettantistica Pro Gorizia is an Italian association football club located in Gorizia, Friuli-Venezia Giulia. It plays in Eccellenza. Its colors are blue and white.

The club was founded in 1923 and spent two seasons in Serie B just after World War II.
