= 1939–40 Coppa Italia =

Tournament details
- Country: Italy
- Dates: 3 Sept 1939 – 15 June 1940
- Teams: 158

Final positions
- Champions: Fiorentina (1st title)
- Runners-up: Genova 1893

Tournament statistics
- Matches played: 170
- Goals scored: 608 (3.58 per match)
- Top goal scorer(s): Italo Salvadori (7 goals)

The 1939–40 Coppa Italia was the seventh Coppa Italia, the major Italian domestic cup. The competition was won by Fiorentina.

== Serie C elimination round ==
Home team	Score	Away team
Ponziana	5-0	Grion Pola
Sandonatese	4-1	Pordenone
Fiumana	6-0	Ampelea Isola
Pro Gorizia	3-4 (aet)	Monfalcone
Giovinezza	0-2	Treviso
Vicenza	4-0	Mestre
Schio	4-4 (aet)	Marzotto Valdagno
Trento	1-1 (aet)	Audace
Como	3-2	Seregno
Mantova	2-1	Rovigo
Reggiana	2-0	Redaelli
Casalini	2-1	Pirelli
Piacenza	0-2	Cremonese
Ardens Bergamo	1-5	Alfa Romeo
Parma	5-1	Pavese
Monza	2-1	Pro Ponte
Varese	3-0	Lecco
Crema	4-1	Falck
Cantù	2-1	Codogno
Pro Patria	2-3	Legnano
Asti	1-1 (aet)	Casale
Gallaratese	1-4	Cusiana
Biellese	5-0	Juventus Domo
Caratese	2-1	Gerli Cusano Milanino
Saviglianese	5-3	Pinerolo
Ilva Savona	3-1	Cuneo
Acqui	2-0	Vado
Manlio Cavagnaro	6-0	Tigullia
Albenga	1-2	Andrea Doria
Pontedera	2-1	Spezia
Entella	4-2	Littorio Rivarolo
Carrarese	2-1	Empoli
Prato	4-1	Signe
Grosseto	1-2	Cecina
Arezzo	1-3	San Giovanni Valdarno
Montevarchi Calcio Aquila	5-0	Tiferno
Ravenna	6-1	Baracca Lugo
Forlì	0-3	Carpi
Borzacchini	2-0	Jesi
Libertas Rimini	3-0	Vis Pesaro
Ferrara	6-0	Forlimpopoli
Dinasimaz Popoli	3-1	Interamnia Teramo
Aeronautica Umbra	3-1	Gubbio
Alma Juventus Fano	3-0	Ascoli
Sambenedettese	0-3	Macerata
Aquila	0-1	Supertessile Rieti
Pescara	4-0	Giulianova
Civitavecchia	2-1	Ilva Bagnolese
Orbetello	2-7	MATER
Savoia	5-0	Alba Motor
Baratta Battipaglia	1-0	Potenza
Stabia	2-1	Sora
Taranto	1-4	Salernitana
Molfetta	0-2	Bisceglie
Lecce	1-1 (aet)	Taranto
Brindisi	5-1	Foggia
Messina	4-1	Cosenza
Siracusa	1-1 (aet)	Agrigento

Replay matches

Home team	Score	Away team
Marzotto Valdagno	4-3	Schio
Audace	2-0	Trento
Casale	2-0	Asti
Taranto	2-1	Lecce
Agrigento	0-0 (aet) *	Siracusa

* Siracusa qualify after drawing of lots.

== First round ==
6 clubs were added (Valpolcevera, Pistoiese, Juventus Siderno, Manfredonia, Cagliari, and GIL Terranova).

Home team	Score	Away team
Valpolcevera	2-0	Andrea Doria
Monfalcone	2-2 (aet)	Sandonatese
Treviso	3-2	Marzotto Valdagno
Mantova	4-3 (aet)	Casalini
Vicenza	2-1	Audace
Fiumana	4-0	Ponziana
Parma	1-0 (aet)	Cremonese
Monza	2-1	Como
Reggiana	3-2 (aet)	Crema
Varese	0-0 (aet)	Alfa Romeo
Legnano	4-1	Cusiana
Biellese	2-0	Casale
Ilva Savona	5-0	Saviglianese
Manlio Cavagnaro	3-2	Acqui
Caratese	2-2 (aet)	Cantù
Pistoiese	0-1	Pontedera
Entella	4-0	Carrarese
Prato	8-0	Cecina
Carpi	3-2	Ravenna
San Giovanni Valdarno	2-0 (aet)	Montevarchi Calcio Aquila
Ferrara	2-3 (aet)	Libertas Rimini
Borzacchini	2-0	Aeronautica Umbra
Macerata	1-0	Alma Juventus Fano
Supertessile Rieti	0-3	MATER
Pescara	2-1 (aet)	Dinasimaz Popoli
Salernitana	2-0	Juventus Siderno
Messina	0-1	Siracusa
Savoia	1-0	Civitavecchia
Stabia	3-2	Baratta Battipaglia
Bisceglie	4-0	Manfredonia
Cagliari	9-0	GIL Terranova
Brindisi	0-0 (aet)	Taranto

Replay matches

Home team	Score	Away team
Sandonatese	2-1	Monfalcone
Alfa Romeo	0-1	Varese
Cantù	1-0	Caratese
Taranto	2-1	Brindisi

== Second round ==
Home team	Score	Away team
Parma	0-1 (aet)	Varese
Fiumana	4-0	Sandonatese
Reggiana	2-1	Mantova
Legnano	2-3	Monza
Biellese	3-1	Cantù
Libertas Rimini	1-3 (aet)	Carpi
Vicenza	5-1	Treviso
Entella	1-2	Manlio Cavagnaro
Ilva Savona	2-0	Valpolcevera
Pontedera	1-0	Prato
Borzacchini	2-0	Cagliari
Pescara	2-2 (aet)	Macerata
Stabia	1-2	Siracusa
Taranto	1-2	Bisceglie
MATER	4-1	San Giovanni Valdarno
Savoia	2-1 (aet)	Salernitana

Replay match

Home team	Score	Away team
Macerata	6-0	Pescara

== Serie B elimination round ==
Home team	Score	Away team
Atalanta	4-2	Udinese
Padova	0-1	Brescia

== Third round ==
16 Serie B clubs were added (Hellas Verona, Vigevano, Atalanta, Brescia, Pro Vercelli, Sanremese, Alessandria, Lucchese, Livorno, Catania, Siena, Pisa, Anconitana-Bianchi, Molinella, Juventina Palermo, and Fanfulla).

Home team	Score	Away team
Fiumana	1-0	Hellas Verona
Reggiana	4-0	Vigevano
Atalanta	3-3 (aet)	Brescia
Biellese	5-4	Pro Vercelli
Manlio Cavagnaro	2-1	Sanremese
Ilva Savona	1-0	Alessandria
Lucchese	0-1	Livorno
Catania	5-2	MATER
Borzacchini	0-1	Siena
Vicenza	4-2 (aet)	Monza
Carpi	1-1 (aet)	Pontedera
Macerata	1-0 (aet)	Pisa
Savoia	2-1	Bisceglie
Anconitana-Bianchi	2-2 (aet)	Molinella
Siracusa	1-0	Juventina Palermo
Varese	4-1	Fanfulla

Replay matches

Home team	Score	Away team
Brescia	4-0	Atalanta
Pontedera	1-0	Carpi
Molinella	0-1	Anconitana-Bianchi

== Round of 32 ==
16 Serie A clubs were added (Novara, Milano, Fiorentina, Triestina, Lazio, Roma, Juventus, Ambrosiana-Inter, Torino, Modena, Venezia, Napoli, Genova 1893, Bari, Bologna, and Liguria).

Home team	Score	Away team
Novara	0-2	Milano
Fiorentina	7-1	Manlio Cavagnaro
Triestina	1-2 (aet)	Lazio
Roma	6-1	Pontedera
Biellese	0-3	Juventus
Ambrosiana-Inter	1-2	Torino
Venezia	2-1	Varese
Savoia	1-3	Napoli
Macerata	3-2	Vicenza
Brescia	4-2	Siracusa
Anconitana-Bianchi	1-3	Modena
Siena	5-3	Ilva Savona
Bari	2-0	Catania
Bologna	3-1	Livorno
Reggiana	1-2 (aet)	Genova 1893
Fiumana	0-0 (aet)	Liguria

Replay match

Home team	Score	Away team
Liguria	4-2	Fiumana

== Round of 16 ==
Home team	Score	Away team
Juventus	3-1	Roma
Lazio	2-0	Macerata
Milano	1-1 (aet)	Fiorentina
Napoli	0-1	Genova 1893
Modena	3-1	Venezia
Siena	0-2	Bari
Liguria	2-1	Bologna
Brescia	3-1	Torino

Replay match

Home team	Score	Away team
Fiorentina	5-0	Milano

== Quarter-finals ==
Home team	Score	Away team
Modena	1-2 (aet)	Genova 1893
Fiorentina	4-1	Lazio
Juventus	3-0	Brescia
Bari	3-0	Liguria

== Semi-finals ==
Home team	Score	Away team
Fiorentina	3-0	Juventus
Genova 1893	2-0	Bari

== Final ==
15 June 1940

Fiorentina	1–0	Genova 1893
Celoria 26'

Stadio Giovanni Berta, Florence

== Top goalscorers ==
Rank	Player	Club	Goals
1	(Italy) Italo Salvadori	Vicenza	7
2	(Italy) Giuseppe Chiesa	Vicenza	6
2	(Italy) Enrico Grazioli	Brescia	6
4	(Italy) Rodolfo Volk	Fiumana	5
4	(Italy) Virgilio Cavalieri	Fiumana	5
4	(Italy) Otello Trombetta	MATER	5
4	(Italy) Mario Celoria	Fiorentina	5
4	(Italy) Giuseppe Baldini	Fiorentina	5
4	(Italy) Piero Antona	Fiorentina	5
4	(Italy) Walter Rambaldi	Prato	5
4	(Italy) Luciano Degara	Biellese	5
