= 1940–41 Serie C =

Serie C
- Season: 1940–41
- Promoted: Pro Patria; Fiumana; Prato; Pescara
- Relegated: many disbanded clubs

The 1940–41 Serie C was the sixth edition of Serie C, the third highest league in the Italian football league system.

== Legend ==
Promoted
Relegated

== Girone A ==
Pos	Team	Pld	Pts
1	Fiumana	27	36
2	Lanerossi Schio	27	34
3	Ponziana	27	31
4	Treviso	27	33
5	SPAL	27	30
6	DAM Valdagno	27	29
7	CRDA Monfalcone	27	28
8	Mestre	27	27
9	Grion Pola	27	26
10	Rovigo	27	25
11	Ampelea Isola d'Istria	27	22
12	Pieris	27	21 (Note: 1 point deducted.)
13	Pro Gorizia	27	16
14	Belluno (R)	27	16
15	Sandonatese (D, R)	14	13 (Note: Retired during the championship. Retour matches were voided. They had 19 points at the retirement.)

Source: Panini
(D) Disqualified; (R) Relegated

== Girone B ==
Pos	Team	Pld	Pts
1	Audace San Michele	30	43
2	Mantova	30	38
3	Vigevano	30	37
4	Pirelli Milano	30	36
5	Parma	30	35
6	Corradini Suzzara	30	34
7	Crema	30	34
8	Cremonese	30	32
9	Falck Sesto S.G.	30	30
10	Casalini Brescia	30	27
11	Alfa Romeo	30	26
12	Redaelli Rogoredo	30	30
13	Pro Palazzolo (Note: Renounced to play in 1941–42 Serie C.) (D, R)	30	25
14	Piacenza (Note: Later readmitted to Serie C.) (T)	30	23
15	Pro Ponte S. Pietro (R)	30	18 (Note: 1 point deducted.)
16	Monza (R)	30	14

Source: Panini
(D) Disqualified; (R) Relegated; (T) Qualified, but not yet for the particular phase indicated

== Girone C ==
Pos	Team	Pld	Pts
1	Pro Patria	30	52
2	Biellese	30	44
3	Varese	30	40
4	Gallaratese	30	39
5	Casale	30	34
6	Como	30	32
7	Seregno	30	32
8	Juventus Domo	30	30
9	Legnano	30	29
10	Galliate	30	27
11	Cantù	30	23 (Note: 1 point deducted. Cusiana’s activity suspended for WW2.)
12	Caratese	30	22
13	Dop. Meda	30	21
14	Lecco (Note: Later readmitted to Serie C.) (T)	30	19
15	Pavese (T)	30	19
16	Cusiana Omegna (R)	30	15

Source: Panini
(R) Relegated; (T) Qualified, but not yet for the particular phase indicated

== Girone D ==
Pos	Team	Pld	Pts
1	Cavagnaro GE–Sestri	24	34
2	Sanremese	24	32
3	Cuneo	24	30
4	Acqui	24	29
5	Varazze	24	26
6	Asti	24	25
7	Rapallo	24	24
8	Albenga	24	23
9	Savigliano	24	23
10	Ilva Savona (Note: Renounced to play in 1941–42 Serie C.) (D, R)	24	22
11	Littorio GE–Rivarolo	24	15
12	Pinerolo	24	12 (Note: 1 point deducted.)
13	Entella (D)	13	11 (Note: Retired during the championship. Retour matches were voided. They had 17 points at the retirement. Later readmitted for war reasons.)
14	Valpolcevera (D, R, E)	13	9 (Note: Retired during the championship. Retour matches were voided. Activity interrupted for war reasons.)
15	Vado (E)	-	0 (Note: Did not play. Activity interrupted for war reasons.)

Source: Panini
(D) Disqualified; (E) Eliminated; (R) Relegated

== Girone E ==
Pos	Team	Pld	Pts
1	Prato	29	49
2	Pontedera	29	44
3	Grosseto	29	40
4	Carrarese	29	31
5	Carpi	29	29
6	Forte dei Marmi	29	29
7	Amatori Bologna	29	28
8	San Giovanni V.	29	28
9	Arezzo	29	27
10	Orbetello	29	26
11	Cecina	29	26
12	Signe	29	25
13	Gambacciani Empoli	29	23
14	Tiferno (R)	29	22
15	Aquila Montevarchi (Note: Later readmitted to Serie C.) (T)	29	13
16	Aullese (D, R)	15	9 (Note: Retired during the championship. Retour were voided.)

Source: Panini
(D) Disqualified; (R) Relegated; (T) Qualified, but not yet for the particular phase indicated

== Girone F ==
Pos	Team	Pld	Pts
1	Pescara	27	42 (Note: Qualified for better goal difference.)
2	Ravenna	27	42
3	Teramo	27	41
4	Forlì	27	37
5	Imolese	27	33
6	Chieti	27	31
7	Lanciano (Note: Renounced to play in 1941–42 Serie C.) (D, R)	27	28
8	Fano	27	27
9	Libertas Rimini	27	25
10	Molinella	27	24
11	Forlimpopoli	27	21
12	Vis Pesaro	27	17
13	Ascoli	27	16
14	Sambenedettese (D, R)	13	6 (Note: Retired during the championship. Retour matches were voided. 7 points at the retirement.)
15	Baracca Lugo (T)	27	2 (Note: 3 points deducted.)
16	Gubbio (D, R)	-	0 (Note: Retired at the beginning of the championship. Activity suspended for war reasons.)

Source: Panini
(D) Disqualified; (R) Relegated; (T) Qualified, but not yet for the particular phase indicated

== Girone G ==
Pos	Team	Pld	Pts
1	Borzacchini Terni	26	39 (Note: Qualified for better goal difference.)
2	M.A.T.E.R.	26	39
3	Salernitana	26	34
4	Bagnolese	26	31
5	Alba Motor Roma	26	28
6	Savoia	26	28
7	Cavese	26	25
8	L'Aquila	26	23
9	Supertessile Rieti (D, R)	26	23 (Note: 1 point deducted.)
10	Perugia	26	23
11	Foligno	26	19
12	Baratta Battipaglia	26	19
13	Civitavecchia	26	17
14	Stabia (T)	26	15
15	Sora (D, R)	-	0 (Note: Retired during the championship. All their matches were voided. 3 points at the retirement. Activity interrupted for war.)

Source: Panini
(D) Disqualified; (R) Relegated; (T) Qualified, but not yet for the particular phase indicated

== Girone H ==
Pos	Team	Pld	Pts
1	Siracusa	22	31
2	Lecce	22	30
3	Juventina Palermo	22	30
4	Taranto	22	28
5	Brindisi	22	25
6	Catania	22	25
7	Cosenza	22	22
8	Molfetta	22	17
9	Trani	22	16
10	Foggia	22	15 (Note: 1 point deducted.)
11	Bisceglie	22	13
12	Potenza	22	10
13	Messina (D, E)	-	0 (Note: Retired during the championship. All their matches were voided.)

Source: Panini
(D) Disqualified; (E) Eliminated

== Final rounds ==
=== Girone A ===
Pos	Team	Pld	Pts
1	Prato (P)	6	7
2	Pro Patria (P)	6	7
3	Siracusa	6	6
4	Cavagnaro Genova–Sestri	6	4

Source: Panini
(P) Promoted

=== Girone B ===
Pos	Team	Pld	Pts
1	Fiumana (P)	6	8
2	Pescara (P)	6	8
3	Borzacchini Terni	6	6
4	Audace San Michele	6	2

Source: Panini
(P) Promoted
