= 2021–22 LR Vicenza season =

Vicenza
2021–22 season
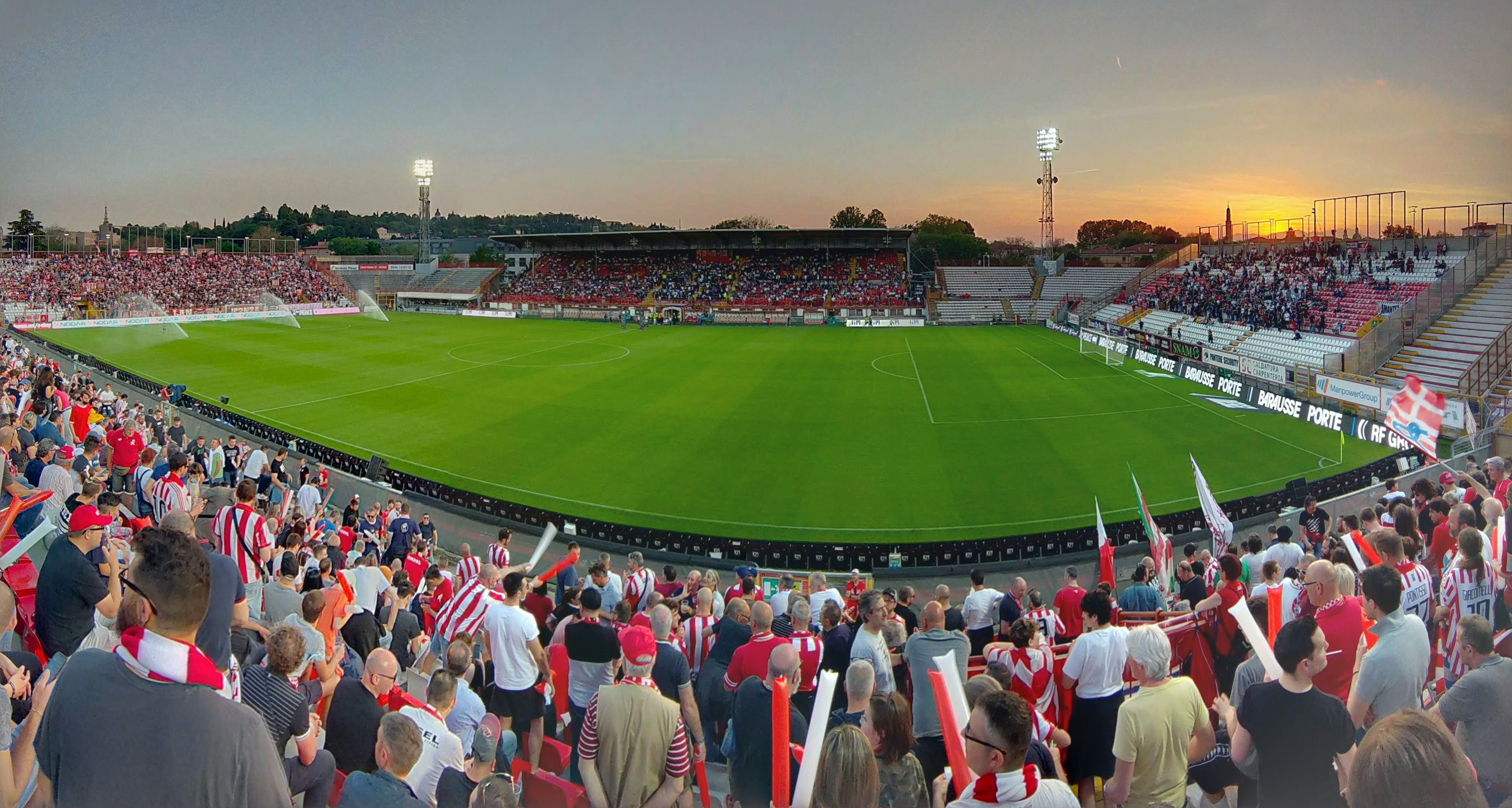
- Relegation play-out versus Cosenza
- Chairman: Renzo Rosso
- Head coach: Domenico Di Carlo (until 22 September); Cristian Brocchi (from 22 September to 11 April); Francesco Baldini (from 12 April)
- Stadium: Stadio Romeo Menti
- Serie B: 17th (relegated)
- Coppa Italia: First round
- Biggest win: Pordenone 2–4 Vicenza

Fourth kit

The 2021–22 season was L.R. Vicenza's second consecutive season in second division of the Italian football league, the Serie B, and the 120th as a football club.

== Players ==
=== First-team squad ===
As of 31 January 2022

Note: Flags indicate national team as defined under FIFA eligibility rules; some limited exceptions apply. Players may hold more than one non-FIFA nationality.

No.	Pos.	Nation	Player
4	DF	FRA	Sebastien De Maio
5	MF	FRA	Anthony Taugourdeau
6	MF	ITA	Loris Zonta (Captain)
7	MF	ITA	Michele Cavion (on loan from Salernitana)
9	FW	ITA	Davide Diaw (on loan from Monza)
10	FW	ITA	Stefano Giacomelli
11	MF	ITA	Filippo Ranocchia (on loan from Juventus)
13	DF	ITA	Nicola Pasini
14	DF	ITA	Emanuele Padella
15	DF	ITA	Matteo Bruscagin
16	MF	GBS	Janio Bikel (on loan from Vancouver)
17	DF	ITA	Riccardo Brosco
20	MF	FRA	Charles Boli (on loan from Lens)
21	GK	ITA	Nikita Contini (on loan from Napoli)

No.	Pos.	Nation	Player
22	GK	ITA	Matteo Grandi
23	DF	ITA	Daniel Cappelletti
26	MF	ITA	Luca Crecco (on loan from Pescara)
30	MF	ITA	Luca Rigoni
34	MF	ITA	Nicola Dalmonte
39	FW	ITA	Tommaso Mancini
69	FW	ITA	Riccardo Meggiorini
70	FW	NED	Alessio Da Cruz (on loan from Parma)
73	DF	ITA	Thomas Sandon
78	FW	ITA	Filippo Alessio
91	FW	POL	Łukasz Teodorczyk
94	DF	BEL	Jordan Lukaku (on loan from Lazio)
98	GK	ITA	Alessandro Confente

=== Out on loan ===
Note: Flags indicate national team as defined under FIFA eligibility rules; some limited exceptions apply. Players may hold more than one non-FIFA nationality.

No.	Pos.	Nation	Player
—	GK	SLO	Rok Brzan (at Adriese)
—	GK	ITA	Semuel Pizzignacco (at Renate)
—	GK	ITA	Alberto Zecchin (at Cartigliano)
—	DF	ITA	Nicholas Fantoni (at ACR Messina)
—	DF	ITA	Mario Ierardi (at Pescara)
—	DF	ITA	Enrico Rossi (at Legnago)
—	MF	ITA	Jean Freddi Greco (at Catania)
—	MF	ITA	Federico Proia (at Brescia)

No.	Pos.	Nation	Player
—	MF	ITA	Simone Tronchin (at Virtus Verona)
—	MF	BEL	Jari Vandeputte (at Catanzaro)
—	MF	ITA	Leonardo Zarpellon (at Virtus Verona)
—	FW	ITA	Tommaso Busatto (at ACR Messina)
—	FW	GAM	Lamin Jallow (at Fehérvár)
—	FW	ITA	Samuele Longo (at Modena)
—	FW	TOG	Issa Ouro Agouda (at Clodiense)

== Pre-season and friendlies ==
Win Draw Loss

24 July 2021 Friendly	Vicenza (Italy)	0–3	(Italy) Cagliari	Vicenza, Italy
16:00 CEST (UTC+2)			Marin 16'; Pavoletti 50'; Dalbert 61'	Stadium: Stadio Romeo Menti; Attendance: 800; Referee: Mario Saugo

30 July 2021 Friendly	Vicenza (Italy)	0–1	(Italy) Lecce	Vicenza, Italy
20:00 CEST (UTC+2)				Stadium: Stadio Romeo Menti

7 August 2021 Friendly	Sassuolo (Italy)	3–1	(Italy) Vicenza	Sassuolo, Italy
18:00 CEST (UTC+2)	Haraslín 7'; Boga 51'; Raspadori 53'	Report	Diaw 24' (pen.)	Stadium: Stadio Enzo Ricci; Referee: Antonio Rapuano

4 September 2021 Friendly	Arzignano Valchiampo (Italy)	1–1	(Italy) Vicenza	Arzignano, Italy
16:00 CEST (UTC+2)				Stadium: Stadio Tommaso Dal Molin

== Competitions ==
=== Overall record ===
Competition	First match	Last match	Starting round	Final position	Record							
Competition	First match	Last match	Starting round	Final position	Pld	W	D	L	GF	GA	GD	Win %
Serie B	21 August 2021	6 May 2022	Matchday 1	17th	38	9	7	22	38	59	−21	23.68
Serie B relegation play-out	12 May 2022	20 May 2022	First leg	Runners-up	2	1	0	1	1	2	−1	50.00
Coppa Italia	15 August 2021		First round	First round	1	0	0	1	2	4	−2	0.00
Total					41	10	7	24	41	65	−24	24.39

Source: Soccerway

=== Serie A ===
==== League table ====
Pos	Team	Pld	W	D	L	GF	GA	GD	Pts	Promotion, qualification or relegation
15	SPAL	38	9	15	14	46	54	−8	42	
16	Cosenza (O)	38	8	11	19	36	59	−23	35	Qualification for relegation play-out
17	Vicenza (R)	38	9	7	22	38	59	−21	34 (Note: Vicenza finished ahead of Alessandria on head-to-head points: Vicenza 2–1 Alessandria, Alessandria 0–1 Vicenza.)	Qualification for relegation play-out
18	Alessandria (R)	38	8	10	20	37	59	−22	34	Relegation to Serie C
19	Crotone (R)	38	4	14	20	41	61	−20	26	Relegation to Serie C

Source: Lega Serie B (in Italian), Soccerway (in English)
Rules for classification: 1) Points; 2) Head-to-head points; 3) Head-to-head goal difference; 4) Goal difference; 5) Goals scored; 6) Draw.
(O) Play-off winners; (R) Relegated

==== Results summary ====
Overall								Home						Away					
Pld	W	D	L	GF	GA	GD	Pts	W	D	L	GF	GA	GD	W	D	L	GF	GA	GD
38	9	7	22	38	59	−21	34	5	5	9	22	26	−4	4	2	13	16	33	−17

Source: Serie B

==== Results by round ====
Round	1	2	3	4	5	6	7	8	9	10	11	12	13	14	15	16	17	18	19	20	21	22	23	24	25	26	27	28	29	30	31	32	33	34	35	36	37	38
Ground																																						
Result	L	L	L	L	L	L	W	L	L	D	L	L	L	W	L	L	L	D	L	W	L	D	D	D	D	W	L	W	L	L	W	L	D	L	L	W	W	W
Position	18	18	17	19	19	20	19	19	19	19	19	19	19	19	19	19	20	20	20	20	20	19	19	19	19	18	18	18	18	18	18	18	18	18	18	18	18	17

Source: Serie B
A = Away; H = Home; W = Win; D = Draw; L = Loss

==== Matches ====
The league fixtures were announced on 24 July 2021.

28 August 2021	Vicenza	0–2	Frosinone	Vicenza
				Stadium: Stadio Romeo Menti

18 September 2021	Vicenza	1–3	Pisa	Vicenza
				Stadium: Stadio Romeo Menti

26 September 2021	Vicenza	0–1	Cremonese	Vicenza
				Stadium: Stadio Romeo Menti

16 October 2021	Vicenza	0–1	Reggina	Vicenza
				Stadium: Stadio Romeo Menti

27 October 2021	Vicenza	1–1	Monza	Vicenza
				Stadium: Stadio Romeo Menti

20 November 2021	Vicenza	2–3	Brescia	Vicenza
				Stadium: Stadio Romeo Menti

30 November 2021	Vicenza	2–3	Benevento	Vicenza
				Stadium: Stadio Romeo Menti

12 December 2021	Vicenza	0–1	Como	Vicenza
				Stadium: Stadio Romeo Menti

23 January 2022	Vicenza	3–3	Cittadella	Vicenza
				Stadium: Stadio Romeo Menti

30 January 2022	Vicenza	2–1	Alessandria	Vicenza
				Stadium: Stadio Romeo Menti

12 February 2022	Vicenza	0–0	Cosenza	Vicenza
				Stadium: Stadio Romeo Menti

19 February 2022	Vicenza	1–1	SPAL	Vicenza
				Stadium: Stadio Romeo Menti

26 February 2022	Vicenza	1–0	Pordenone	Vicenza
				Stadium: Stadio Romeo Menti

6 March 2022	Vicenza	3–1	Ternana	Vicenza
				Stadium: Stadio Romeo Menti

15 March 2022	Vicenza	0–1	Parma	Vicenza
				Stadium: Stadio Romeo Menti

20 March 2022	Vicenza	2–0	Ascoli	Vicenza
				Stadium: Stadio Romeo Menti

6 April 2022	Vicenza	1–1	Crotone	Vicenza
				Stadium: Stadio Romeo Menti

18 April 2022	Vicenza	1–2	Perugia	Vicenza
				Stadium: Stadio Romeo Menti

30 April 2022	Vicenza	2–1	Lecce	Vicenza
				Stadium: Stadio Romeo Menti

==== Relegation play-out ====
12 May 2022 First leg	Vicenza	1–0	Cosenza	Vicenza
20:30 CEST (UTC+2)	Maggio 90'	Report		Stadium: Stadio Romeo Menti

20 May 2022 Second leg	Cosenza	2–0 (2–1 agg.)	Vicenza	Cosenza
20:30 CEST (UTC+2)		Report		Stadium: Stadio San Vito-Gigi Marulla

=== Coppa Italia ===
15 August 2021 First round	Empoli	4–2	Vicenza	Empoli
17:45 CEST (UTC+2)	Bajrami 11'; Haas 30'; Mancuso 37'; Luperto (yellow card) 57'; Ricci (yellow card) 64'; Crociata 88'	Report	Rigoni (yellow card) 31'; Dalmonte (yellow card) 32', (goal) 39'; Lanzafame 56'; Pontisso (yellow card) 66'; Di Pardo (yellow card) 82'	Stadium: Stadio Carlo Castellani; Attendance: 0 Referee: Juan Luca Sacchi
