= 2023–24 LR Vicenza season =

LR Vicenza
2023–24 season
- Manager: Aimo Diana (until 18 December)
- Stadium: Stadio Romeo Menti
- Serie C Group A: 3rd
- Promotion play-offs: National phase second round
- Coppa Italia Serie C: Quarter-finals
- Top goalscorer: League: Franco Ferrari (16); All: Franco Ferrari (16)

The 2023–24 season was LR Vicenza's 122nd season in existence and second consecutive season in the Serie C. They also competed in the Coppa Italia Serie C.

== Players ==
=== First-team squad ===
As of 2 September 2023

Note: Flags indicate national team as defined under FIFA eligibility rules; some limited exceptions apply. Players may hold more than one non-FIFA nationality.

No.	Pos.	Nation	Player
1	GK	SLO	Rok Bržan
5	DF	ITA	Giuliano Laezza
8	MF	ITA	Michele Cavion
9	FW	ITA	Franco Ferrari
10	MF	BRA	Ronaldo
11	FW	ITA	Alex Rolfini
12	GK	ITA	Samuele Massolo
13	DF	ITA	Nicola Pasini
15	MF	ITA	Jean Freddi Greco
17	MF	ITA	Fabio Scarsella
18	MF	ITA	Simone Tronchin
20	MF	ESP	Kaleb Jiménez (on loan from Salernitana)
21	MF	ITA	Riccardo Cataldi
24	DF	ITA	Federico Valietti (on loan from Genoa)

No.	Pos.	Nation	Player
26	DF	ITA	Filippo De Col
28	DF	ITA	Christian Corradi
29	MF	ITA	Federico Proia
32	DF	ITA	Filippo Costa
44	MF	ITA	Raul Talarico
55	DF	SRB	Vladimir Golemić
68	DF	ITA	Mario Ierardi
73	DF	ITA	Thomas Sandon
98	GK	ITA	Alessandro Confente
99	MF	ITA	Matteo Della Morte
—	DF	ITA	Alberto Lattanzio
—	MF	ITA	Fausto Rossi
—	FW	ITA	Jacopo Pellegrini (on loan from Sassuolo)

=== Other players under contract ===
Note: Flags indicate national team as defined under FIFA eligibility rules; some limited exceptions apply. Players may hold more than one non-FIFA nationality.

No.	Pos.	Nation	Player
—	DF	FRA	Sebastien De Maio
—	DF	ITA	Nicholas Fantoni

No.	Pos.	Nation	Player
—	DF	ITA	Federico Paoloni
—	DF	ITA	Mattia Santi

=== Out on loan ===
Note: Flags indicate national team as defined under FIFA eligibility rules; some limited exceptions apply. Players may hold more than one non-FIFA nationality.

No.	Pos.	Nation	Player
—	DF	ITA	Christian Corradi (at Roma U19 until 30 June 2024)
—	MF	ITA	Stefano Cester (at Torres until 30 June 2024)
—	MF	ITA	Nicola Dalmonte (at SPAL until 30 June 2024)

No.	Pos.	Nation	Player
—	MF	ITA	Loris Zonta (at Taranto until 30 June 2024)
—	FW	ITA	Filippo Alessio (at Hellas Verona U19 until 30 June 2024)

== Transfers ==
=== In ===
Pos.	Player	Transferred from	Fee	Date	Source

=== Out ===
Pos.	Player	Transferred to	Fee	Date	Source

== Pre-season and friendlies ==
Win Draw Loss Fixtures

19 August 2023 18th Alfonso Santagiuliana Memorial	Vicenza (Italy)	4–0	(Italy) Arzignano Valchiampo
20:30 CEST (UTC+2)	Ferrari 45'; Jiménez 77'; Proia 79'; Tronchin 84'	Report		Attendance: 1,686; Referee: Carlo Rinaldi

26 August 2023 Friendly	Vicenza (Italy)	0–1	(Italy) Virtus Verona
18:30 CEST (UTC+2)			Toffanin 58'

== Competitions ==
=== Overall record ===
Competition	First match	Last match	Starting round	Final position	Record							
Competition	First match	Last match	Starting round	Final position	Pld	W	D	L	GF	GA	GD	Win %
Serie C	4 September 2023	28 April 2024	Matchday 1	3rd	38	20	11	7	52	30	+22	52.63
Promotion play-offs	14 May 2024		First round		3	2	1	0	3	0	+3	66.67
Coppa Italia Serie C	7 November 2023	13 December 2023	Second round	Quarter-finals	3	2	1	0	5	2	+3	66.67
Total					44	24	13	7	60	32	+28	54.55

Source: Soccerway

=== Serie C ===
==== League table ====
Pos	Team	Pld	W	D	L	GF	GA	GD	Pts	Qualification
1	Mantova (P)	38	24	8	6	72	31	+41	80	Promotion to Serie B and Supercoppa di Serie C
2	Padova	38	21	14	3	55	28	+27	77	National play-offs 2nd round
3	Vicenza	38	20	11	7	52	30	+22	71	National play-offs 1st round
4	Triestina	38	19	7	12	61	44	+17	64	Group play-offs 2nd round
5	Atalanta U23	38	16	11	11	43	36	+7	59	Group play-offs 1st round

Updated to match(es) played on 28 April 2024. Source: Lega Pro, Soccerway (in English)
Rules for classification: 1) Points; 2) Head-to-head points; 3) Head-to-head goal difference; 4) Goal difference; 5) Goals scored; 6) Lower goals against; 7) Wins; 8) Lower losses; 9) Away wins; 10) Lower home losses.
(Note: Head-to-head record is used only after all the matches between the teams in question have been played)
(P) Promoted

==== Results summary ====
Overall								Home						Away					
Pld	W	D	L	GF	GA	GD	Pts	W	D	L	GF	GA	GD	W	D	L	GF	GA	GD
38	20	11	7	52	30	+22	71	12	5	2	27	10	+17	8	6	5	25	20	+5

Source: Worldfootball

==== Results by round ====
Round	1	2	3	4	5	6	7	8	9	10	11	12	13	14	15	16	17	18	19
Ground	H	A	H	A	H	H	A	H	A	A	H	A	H	A	H	A	H	A	H
Result	D	W	W	D	W	W	L	L	D	L	D	W	W	L	W	D	L	L	W
Position	10	2	2	4	3	2	3	5	6	8	8	7	6	6	5	5	5	8	7

Source: Worldfootball
A = Away; H = Home; W = Win; D = Draw; L = Loss

==== Matches ====
The league fixtures were unveiled on 7 August 2023.

4 September 2023 1	Vicenza	0–0	AlbinoLeffe	Vicenza
20:45 CEST (UTC+2)				Stadium: Stadio Romeo Menti; Referee: Andrea Zanotti

17 September 2023 3	Vicenza	1–0	Lumezzane	Vicenza
18:30 CEST (UTC+2)				Stadium: Stadio Romeo Menti

24 September 2023 5	Vicenza	1–0	Pergolettese	Vicenza
16:15 CEST (UTC+2)				Stadium: Stadio Romeo Menti

30 September 2023 6	Vicenza	3–0	Atalanta U23	Vicenza
20:45 CEST (UTC+2)				Stadium: Stadio Romeo Menti

15 October 2023 8	Vicenza	1–2	Renate	Vicenza
16:15 CEST (UTC+2)				Stadium: Stadio Romeo Menti

24 October 2023 10	Fiorenzuola	3–1	Vicenza	Fiorenzuola d'Arda
20:45 CEST (UTC+2)	Alberti 44'; Omoregbe 68', 86'		Pellegrini 83'	Stadium: Stadio comunale

29 October 2023 11	Vicenza	1–1	Padova	Vicenza
14:00 CET (UTC+1)	De Col 30'		Radrezza 83'	Stadium: Stadio Romeo Menti

3 November 2023 12	Arzignano Valchiampo	0–1	Vicenza	Arzignano
20:45 CEST (UTC+2)			De Col 90+2'	Stadium: Stadio Tommaso Dal Molin

11 November 2023 13	Vicenza	3–1	Pro Patria	Vicenza
18:30 CET (UTC+1)				Stadium: Stadio Romeo Menti

18 November 2023 14	Legnago Salus	1–0	Vicenza	Legnago
14:00

25 November 2023 15	Vicenza	2–0	Pro Sesto	Vicenza
20:45				Stadium: Stadio Romeo Menti

3 December 2023 16	Novara	2–2	Vicenza	Novara
14:00

8 December 2023 17	Vicenza	0–2	Mantova	Vicenza
17:00				Stadium: Stadio Romeo Menti

17 December 2023 18	Trento	4–1	Vicenza	Trento
14:00

22 December 2023 19	Vicenza	1–0	Alessandria	Vicenza
20:45				Stadium: Stadio Romeo Menti

6 January 2024 20	AlbinoLeffe	0–0	Vicenza	Zanica
14:00				Stadium: AlbinoLeffe Stadium

14 January 2024 21	Vicenza	3–1	Giana Erminio	Vicenza
18:30				Stadium: Stadio Romeo Menti

20 January 2024 22	Lumezzane	2–1	Vicenza	Lumezzane
16:15				Stadium: Stadio Tullio Saleri

28 January 2024 23	Vicenza	0–0	Virtus Verona	Vicenza
18:30				Stadium: Stadio Romeo Menti

3 February 2024 24	Pergolettese	0–2	Vicenza	Crema
18:30

10 February 2024 25	Atalanta U23	1–2	Vicenza	Caravaggio
18:30				Stadium: Stadio Comunale

13 February 2024 26	Vicenza	2–0	Pro Vercelli	Vicenza
20:30				Stadium: Stadio Romeo Menti

17 February 2024 27	Renate	0–2	Vicenza	Renate
16:15

25 February 2024 28	Vicenza	2–0	Triestina	Vicenza
16:00				Stadium: Stadio Romeo Menti

6 March 2024 30	Padova	1–1	Vicenza	Padua
20:45

10 March 2024 31	Vicenza	1–0	Arzignano Valchiampo	Vicenza
20:45				Stadium: Stadio Romeo Menti

16 March 2024 32	Pro Patria	0–1	Vicenza	Busto Arsizio
18:30

19 March 2024 29	Vicenza	1–1	Fiorenzuola	Vicenza
19:30				Stadium: Stadio Romeo Menti
Note: The match was originally scheduled for 3 March 2024, but was postponed due to pitch conditions after storm.

23 March 2024 33	Vicenza	1–1	Legnago Salus	Vicenza
17:30				Stadium: Stadio Romeo Menti

7 April 2024 35	Vicenza	2–1	Novara	Vicenza
18:30				Stadium: Stadio Romeo Menti

10 April 2024 34	Pro Sesto	1–1	Vicenza	Sesto San Giovanni
18:00				Stadium: Stadio Ernesto Breda

14 April 2024 36	Mantova	1–2	Vicenza	Mantua
18:30

20 April 2024 37	Vicenza	2–0	Trento	Vicenza
18:30	Della Morte 18'; Ronaldo 25'			Stadium: Stadio Romeo Menti

28 April 2024 38	Alessandria	1–2	Vicenza	Alessandria
16:30 CEST (UTC+2)	Busatto 37' (pen.); Gega (yellow card) 46' (yellow-red card) 71'		Busato 89'; Ferrari 90+5' (pen.)	Stadium: Stadio Giuseppe Moccagatta; Referee: Andrea Zoppi

==== Promotion play-offs ====
===== National phase first round =====
14 May 2024 Second leg	Taranto	0–1	Vicenza	Taranto
20:30 CEST (UTC+2)

18 May 2024 Second leg	Vicenza	0–0 (1–0 agg.)	Taranto	Vicenza
21:00 CEST (UTC+2)				Stadium: Stadio Romeo Menti

===== National phase second round =====
22 May 2024 First leg	Vicenza	2–0	Padova	Vicenza
20:30 CEST (UTC+2)	Ferrari 10', 50'			Stadium: Stadio Romeo Menti

25 May 2024 Second leg	Padova	v	Vicenza	Padua
20:30 CEST (UTC+2)

=== Coppa Italia Serie C ===
7 November 2023 Second round	Vicenza	3–2 (a.e.t.)	Pro Patria	Vicenza
18:30 CET (UTC+1)	De Col 6'; Rolfini 11'; Tronchin 105'		Citterio 49'; Parker 54' (pen.)	Stadium: Stadio Romeo Menti
