= 1970–71 Serie D =

Fourth Italian football championship

The Serie D 1970-1971 was the twelfth edition of the semi-professional competition of the present-day Lega Pro.

== Rules ==
Nine geographical independent championships. In each group: first team promoted, last three teams relegated.

== Group A (North-West) ==
	team	Pti	note
1.	Pro Vercelli	50	promoted (tiebreaker)
2.	Biellese	50
3.	Sarzanese	44
4.	Astimacobi	43
5.	Cossatese	43
6.	Gaviese	36
7.	Canelli	31
8.	Albenga	30
9.	Borgomanero	30
10.	Borgosesia	30
11.	Ivrea	30
12.	Arona	29
13.	Casale	29
14.	Sestrese	29
15.	Rapallo Ruentes	29
16.	Omegna	28	re-elected
17.	Cuneo	26	relegated
18.	Aosta	25	relegated

== Group B (Lombardy) ==
	team	Pti	note
1.	CREMONESE	53	promoted
2.	Trevigliese	48
3.	Crema	40
4.	Fanfulla	40
5.	Pavia	38
6.	Pro Sesto	37
7.	Pergolettese	36
8.	Moglia	34
9.	Guastalla	33
10.	Vigevano	32
11.	Melzo	32
12.	Falck Vobarno	31
13.	Gallaratese	30
14.	Meda	30
15.	Sassuolo	29
16.	Carpi	27	re-elected
17.	S. Angelo Lodigiano	24	relegated
18.	San Secondo Parmense	18	relegated

== Group C (North-East) ==
	team	Pti	note
1.	BELLUNO	48	promoted
2.	Portogruaro	46
3.	Arco	44
4.	Bolzano	43
5.	Pordenone	42
6.	Clodia	37
7.	Audace San Michele	35
8.	San Donà	33
9.	Mestrina	31
10.	Schio	31
11.	Oltrisarco	31
12.	Lignano	31
13.	Malo	29
14.	Bassano	29
15.	Valdagno	27
16.	Passirio Merano	26	relegated
17.	Vittorio Veneto	25	relegated
18.	Giorgione	24	relegated

== Group D (Emily-Marches) ==
	team	Pti	note
1.	GIULIANOVA	48	promoted
2.	Bellaria	47
3.	Rovigo	47
4.	Riccione	43
5.	Fano	38
6.	Sangiorgese	37
7.	Vis Pesaro	35
8.	Civitanovese	34
9.	Teramo	33
10.	Jesi	33
11.	Fermana	32
12.	Serenissima	31
13.	Baracca Lugo	31
14.	Cervia	31
15.	Forlì	30
16.	Pergolese	28	relegated
17.	Cesenatico	17	relegated
18.	Passamonti Camerino	17	relegated

== Group E (Tuscany and more) ==
	team	Pti	note
1.	SANGIOVANNESE	47	promoted
2.	Pistoiese	43
3.	Città Castello	43
4.	Carrarese	42
5.	Foligno	38
6.	Sansepolcro	37
7.	Grosseto	36
8.	Pietrasanta	35
9.	Siena	35
10.	Forte De Marmi	34
11.	Gubbio	34
12.	Pontedera	30
13.	Spoleto	30
14.	Camaiore	29
15.	Rondinella	29
16.	Quarrata	29	re-elected (tiebreaker)
17.	Fortis Borgo San Lorenzo	23	relegated
18.	Signe	18	relegated

== Group F (Lazio-Sardinia) ==
	team	Pti	note
1.	FROSINONE	54	promoted
2.	Latina	52
3.	Almas Roma	39
4.	Romulea	37
5.	Calangianus	35
6.	Velletri	33
7.	Palestrina	32
8.	Tevere Roma	32
9.	L'Aquila	32
10.	Alatri	32
11.	Alghero	31
12.	Tharros Oristano	31
13.	Guspini	30
14.	Sora	30
15.	Civitavecchia	30
16.	Forza e Coraggio Avezzano	29	relegated
17.	Anzio	27	relegated
18.	Formia	27	relegated

== Group G (South-West) ==
	team	Pti	note
1.	TURRIS	50	promoted
2.	Ischia	44
3.	Paganese	40
4.	Battipagliese	39
5.	Palmese	38
6.	Portici	37
7.	Nicastro	36
8.	Puteolana	35
9.	Cavese	35
10.	Nocerina	35
11.	Juve Stabia	32
12.	Terzigno	31
13.	Angri	31
14.	Castrovillari	30
15.	Benevento	30
16.	Morrone Cosenza	29	relegated
17.	Sessana	28	relegated
18.	S. Agata	12	relegated

== Group H (South-East) ==
	team	Pti	note
1.	TRANI	53	promoted
2.	Cerignola	47
3.	Angolana	45
4.	Andria	44
5.	Molfetta	41
6.	Termoli	40
7.	Pro Lanciano	37
8.	Bitonto	36
9.	Manfredonia	35
10.	Poggiardo	35
11.	Manduria	34
12.	Monopoli	33
13.	Nardò	30
14.	Lavello	27
15.	Policoro	26
16.	Flacco Venosa	21	relegated
17.	Mesagne	14	relegated
18.	Novoli	13	relegated

== Group I (Far South) ==
	team	Pti	note
1.	SIRACUSA	47	promoted (tiebreaker)
2.	Cantieri Navali Palermo	47
3.	Massimiana	41
4.	Akragas	40
5.	Marsala	38
6.	Trapani	38
7.	Caltagirone	34
8.	Nissa	33
9.	Leonzio	33
10.	Paternò	32
11.	Folgore Castelvetrano	32
12.	Avola	31
13.	Floridia	31
14.	Juve Bagheria	29
15.	Ragusa	29
16.	Canicattì	29	relegated
17.	Netina	26	relegated
18.	A.MA.T. Palermo	22	relegated

== References and sources ==
- Almanacco Illustrato del Calcio - La Storia 1898-2004, Panini Edizioni, Modena, September 2005

Specific
