= 1967–68 Serie D =

Fourth Italian football championship

The Serie D 1967-1968 was the ninth edition of the semi-professional competition of the present-day Lega Pro.

== Rules ==
Nine geographical independent championships. In each group: first team promoted, last three teams relegated.

== Group A (North-West) ==
	team	Pti	note
1.	MACOBI ASTI	43	promoted
2.	Pro Vercelli	41
3.	Omegna	39
4.	Sanremese	37
5.	Castor Torino	36
6.	Sestrese	36
7.	Cossatese	35
8.	Borgomanero	35
9.	Alassio	34
10.	Cuneo	34
11.	Ivrea	33
12.	Casale	33
13.	Albenga	33
14.	Sestri Levante	33
15.	Imperia	32
16.	Asti	31	relegated
17.	Gruppo C Genova	28	relegated
18.	Ligorna	15	relegated

- Pro Vercelli -4 decisive points

== Group B (Lombardy) ==
	team	Pti	note
1.	CREMONESE	48	promoted
2.	Derthona	44
3.	Pergolettese	44
4.	Seregno	41
5.	Vigevano	38
6.	Parma	34
7.	Fanfulla	33
8.	Pro Sesto	33
9.	Gallaratese	32
10.	Voghera	32
11.	Lilion Snia Varedo	32
12.	Moglia	32
13.	Mirandolese	32
14.	San Secondo PR	31
15.	Leoncelli Vescovato	29
16.	Valtrompia	28	relegated
17.	Guastalla	25	relegated
18.	Saronno	24	relegated

== Group C (North-East) ==
	team	Pti	note
1.	SOTTOMARINA	48	promoted
2.	Rovereto	47
3.	Pordenone	46
4.	Trento	41
5.	Rovigo	37
6.	Portogruaro	35
7.	Alense	34
8.	Jesolo	33
9.	Passirio Merano	33
10.	Vittorio Veneto	32
11.	Saici Torviscosa	32
12.	Coneglianese	31
13.	Belluno	31
14.	San Donà	31
15.	Schio	31
16.	Audace San Michele Extra	30	relegated
17.	Ponziana Trieste	22	relegated
18.	Olivo Arco	18	relegated

== Group D (Emily-Marches) ==
	team	Pti	note
1.	FORLÍ	51	promosso
2.	Riccione	49
3.	Fano	46
4.	Baracca Lugo	43
5.	Imola	37
6.	Cus Urbino	33
7.	San Crispino	32
8.	Carpi	32
9.	Faenza	32
10.	Civitanovese	31
11.	Cervia	31
12.	Fermana	30
13.	Tolentino	30
14.	Fabriano	29
15.	Progresso Castelmaggiore	29
16.	Porto Recanati	29	relegated (tiebreaker)
17.	Serenissima San Marino	27	relegated
18.	San Lazzaro	21	relegated

== Group E (Tuscany-Umbria) ==
	team	Pti	note
1.	VIAREGGIO	51	promoted
2.	Grosseto	50
3.	Aquila Montevarchi	44
4.	Foligno	44
5.	Lucchese	40
6.	Sarzanese	38
7.	Viterbese	36
8.	Piombino	35
9.	Sansepolcro	35
10.	Cecina	32
11.	Poggibonsi	32
12.	Pietrasanta	32
13.	Quarrata	30
14.	Sangiovannese	29
15.	Le Signe	28
16.	Cuoiopelli	26	relegsre
17.	Narnese	17	relegated
18.	Orvietana	16	relegated

== Group F (Lazio-Sardinia) ==
	team	Pti	note
1.	OLBIA	47	promoted
2.	Frosinone	43
3.	Tempio	38
4.	Alatri	38
5.	Latina	37
6.	Sorso	36
7.	Tevere Roma	35
8.	Anzio	34
9.	Alghero	34
10.	Civitavecchiese	32
11.	Calangianus	32
12.	Tharros Oristano	32
13.	Formia	31
14.	Carbonia	30
15.	Romulea	29
16.	Sant'Elena Quartu	26	relegated
17.	Colleferro	24	relegated
18.	Rieti	21	relegated

- Latina -13 decisive points

== Group G (South-West) ==
	team	Pti	note
1.	MATERA	56	promoted
2.	Savoia	52
3.	Nocerina	43
4.	Angri	41
5.	Paganese	41
6.	Puteolana	40
7.	Scafatese	40
8.	Turris	38
9.	Battipagliese	31
10.	Benevento	31
11.	Juve Stabia	29
12.	Maddalonese	27
13.	Melfi	27
14.	Ischia	27
15.	Sessana	26
16.	Bernalda	26	relegated (tiebreaker)
17.	Acerrana	24	relegated
18.	Policoro	16	relegated

== Group H (South-East) ==
	team	Pti	note
1.	BRINDISI	54	promoted
2.	Bisceglie	45
3.	Manfredonia	44
4.	Martinafranca	43
5.	Pro Vasto	43
6.	Poggiardo	39
7.	Novoli	37
8.	Cerignola	37
9.	Molfetta	33
10.	Giulianova	32
11.	Andria	31
12.	Toma Maglie	31
13.	Campobasso	28
14.	Gloria Chieti	27
15.	Forza e Coraggio Avezzano	25
16.	Acquaviva	24	relegated
17.	Interamnia Teramo	21	relegated
18.	Liberty Bari	18	relegated

== Group I (Far South) ==
	team	Pti	note
1.	MARSALA	50	promoted (tiebreaker)
2.	Acquapozzillo	50
3.	Paolana	39
4.	Ragusa	38
5.	Folgore Castelvetrano	38
6.	Nissa	36
7.	Nicastro	35
8.	Enna	35
9.	Cantieri Palermo	34
10.	Palmese	34
11.	Paternò	30
12.	Juventina Palermo	30
13.	Juve Siderno	30
14.	Alcamo	30
15.	Floridia	29
16.	Polistena	29	relegated (tiebreaker)
17.	Nuova Igea	28	relegated
18.	Vibonese	16	regated

== References and sources ==
- Almanacco Illustrato del Calcio - La Storia 1898-2004, Panini Edizioni, Modena, September 2005

Specific
