= Montevarchi Calcio Aquila 1902 =

Italian football club

Montevarchi Aquila
- Full name: Montevarchi Calcio Aquila 1902 Srl
- Founded: 1902
- Ground: Stadio Gastone Brilli Peri, Montevarchi, Italy
- Capacity: 7,200
- Chairman: Angelo Livi
- Manager: Nico Lelli
- League: Serie D Group E
- 2023–24: Serie D Group E, 10th of 18
Home colours	Away colours

Montevarchi Calcio Aquila 1902 is an Italian professional football club, based in Montevarchi, Tuscany. It plays in Serie D Group E.

The manager is Athos Rigucci.

== History ==
=== Foundation ===
The club was founded in 1902 as Società Ciclistica Aquila and in 1926 was renamed Club Sportivo Aquila Montevarchi.

=== Dissolution ===
On 24 November 2011 it was declared bankrupt and immediately excluded from the championship of Eccellenza Tuscany with the consequent radiation from the Italian football.

== Rivalry ==
Its main rivalries of Tuscany included Arezzo, Carrarese, Sangiovannese, Siena, Viareggio, Poggibonsi, Prato, Lucchese, Pistoiese and Massese and those outside the region included Alessandria, Foligno, Pavia and Gualdo.

== Colors and badge ==
The team's colours are red and dark purple.

== Players ==
=== First team squad ===
As of 22 July 2024.

Note: Flags indicate national team as defined under FIFA eligibility rules; some limited exceptions apply. Players may hold more than one non-FIFA nationality.

No.	Pos.	Nation	Player
3	DF	ITA	Tommaso Artini
10	MF	ITA	Christian Rufini
13	DF	ITA	Tommaso Lucatuorto
16	FW	ITA	Edoardo Priore
17	MF	ITA	Marco Bontempi
21	FW	ITA	Leonardo Lorenzini
24	MF	ITA	Riccardo Croci
28	MF	ITA	Luca Lischi
30	FW	ITA	Francesco Virgillito
77	MF	ITA	Andrea Casagni
99	MF	ITA	Lorenzo Boncompagni
—	GK	ITA	Emanuele Conti
—	MF	ITA	Alberto Picchi
—	DF	ITA	Sean Martinelli
—	MF	ITA	Antonio Borgaia
—	DF	ITA	Christian Farini

No.	Pos.	Nation	Player
—	MF	ITA	Andrea Orlandi
—	DF	ITA	Lorenzo Vecchi
—	FW	ITA	Tommaso Carcani
—	GK	ITA	Lorenzo Antonielli
—	DF	ITA	Federico Ficini
—	MF	ITA	Alessandro Zhupa (on loan from SS Arezzo)
—	MF	ITA	Jacopo Ciofi
—	GK	ITA	Nicola Testoni
—	FW	ITA	Alessandro Morozzi
—	DF	ITA	Giuseppe Scaglione
—	MF	ITA	Andrea Nardi
—	MF	ITA	Davide Sesti
—	DF	ITA	Cosimo Bigazzi

=== Out on loan ===
Note: Flags indicate national team as defined under FIFA eligibility rules; some limited exceptions apply. Players may hold more than one non-FIFA nationality.

No. / Pos. / Nation / Player; — / MF / ITA / Alessandro Morozzi (at Fortis Juventus until 30 June 2024)	No. / Pos. / Nation / Player; — / MF / ITA / Andrea Nardi (at Sansovino until 30 June 2024)

== League and cup history ==
Season	A	Tier 2	Tier 3	Tier 4	Tier 5	Tier 6	Tier 7	Tier 8	Pts.	Pl.	W	L	T	GF	GA	GD
1929–30						3 (A)										
1930–31					2 (A)											
1931–32					7 (B)											
1932–33				3 (F)												
1933–34				7 (F)												
1934–35				2 (F)												
1935–36			13 (C)						17	28	5	6	17	29	47	−18
1936–37				4 (A)												
1937–38				11												
1938–39				1 (A)												
1939–40			5 (F)													
1940–41			15 (E)													
1941–42			13 (C)													
1942–43			13 (C)													
1945–46			14 (A, S. Cen)													
1946–47			7 (D, Cen)													
1947–48			4 (N, Cen)													
1948–49					17 (H, Cen.)											
1949–50				3 (A)												
1950–51				3 (A)												
1951–52				1 (F)												
1952–53				2 (C)												
1953–54				3 (C)												
1954–55				2 (C)												
1955–56				2 (B)												
1956–57				3 (B)												
1957–58					10 (B)											
1958–59					2 (B)											
1959–60				7 (C)												
1960–61				3 (C)												
1961–62				1 (C)												
1962–63					8 (B)											
1963–64					8 (B)											
1964–65					2 (B)											
1965–66					1 (B)											
1966–67					1 (B)											
1967–68				3 (D)												
1968–09				4 (E)												
1969–70				1 (D)												
1970–71			18 (B)													
1971–72				1 (E)												
1972–73			9 (B)													
1973–74			14 (B)													
1974–75			14 (B)													
1975–76			18 (B)													
1976–77				6 (E)												
1977–78					3 (E)											
1978–79				2 (A)												
1979–80			15 (B)													
1980–81				5 (C)												
1981–82				18 (C)												
1982–83					2 (E)											
1983–84					1 (E)											
1984–85				10 (A)												
1985–86				16 (A)												
1998–87				11 (A)												
1987–88				2 (A)												
1988–89			8 (A)													
1989–90			17 (A)													
1990–91				15 (A)												
1991–92				3 (B)												
1992–93				8 (B)												
1993–94				10 (B)												
1994–95				1 (B)												
1995–96			12 (A)													
1996–97			9 (A)													
1997–98			12 (A)													
1998–99			7 (A)													
1999–2000			17 (A)													
2000–01				13 (B)												
2001–02				7 (A)												
2002–03				12 (B)												
2003–04				18 (B)												
2004–05				9 (B)												
2005–06				16 (B)												
2006–07					7 (E)											
2007–08					15 (E)											
2008–09					4 (E)											
2009–10					11 (E)											
2010–11					15 (E)				35	34	9	17	8	39	50	−11
2012–13								1 (L)								

=== Relegation play-out result history ===
- 2005–06: Relegated to Serie D after losing out to Prato
- 2007–08: Stayed in Serie D after defeating Cecina

== Honours ==
- Coppa Italia Dilettanti (one title)
  - Winners: 1983–84
