= 1941–42 Serie C =

The 1941–42 Serie C was the seventh edition of Serie C, the third highest league in the Italian football league system.

== Legend ==
Promoted
Relegated

== Girone A ==
Pos	Team	Pld	Pts
1	Pro Gorizia	30	47
2	SPAL	30	42
3	Lanerossi Schio	30	41
4	Pieris	30	35
5	Treviso	30	34
6	Ponziana	30	32
7	Mestre	30	32
8	Audace San Michele	30	32
9	DAM Valdagno	30	31
10	CRDA Monfalcone	30	28
11	Ampelea Isola d'Istria	30	25
12	Bassano	30	25
13	Rovigo	30	24
14	Vittorio Veneto (T)	30	22
15	Grion Pola (Note: Later readmitted to Serie C.) (T)	30	19
16	Pordenone (R)	30	11

Source: Panini
(R) Relegated; (T) Qualified, but not yet for the particular phase indicated

== Girone B ==
Pos	Team	Pld	Pts
1	Cremonese	30	49
2	Parma	30	47
3	Mantova	30	38
4	Corradini Suzzara	30	38
5	Verona	30	38
6	Falck Sesto S.G.	30	33
7	Caproni Trento	30	30
8	Marzotto Manerbio (E)	30	29
9	Gerli Cusano Milanino	30	28
10	Crema	30	28
11	Pirelli Milano	30	27
12	Lecco	30	24
13	Breda Sesto S.G.	30	23
14	Alfa Romeo (R, E)	30	19
15	Pavese (Note: Pavese and Necchi merged to recreate AC Pavia.) (T)	30	17
16	Necchi Pavia (R, E)	30	12

Source: Panini
(E) Eliminated; (R) Relegated; (T) Qualified, but not yet for the particular phase indicated

== Girone C ==
Pos	Team	Pld	Pts
1	Varese	30	51 (Note: Qualified for goal difference.)
2	Vigevano	30	51
3	Gallaratese	30	45
4	Abbiategrasso	30	40
5	Juventus Domo	30	37
6	Redaelli Rogoredo	30	34
7	Seregno	30	32
8	Piacenza	30	31
9	Como	30	30
10	Legnano	30	25
11	Lissone	30	23
12	Cantù	30	23
13	Sparta Novara	30	17
14	Galliate (D, R, E)	30	17 (Note: 1 point deducted.)
15	Meda (Note: Later readmitted to 1942–43 Serie C.) (T)	30	12
16	Caratese (T)	30	11

Source: Panini
(D) Disqualified; (E) Eliminated; (R) Relegated; (T) Qualified, but not yet for the particular phase indicated

== Girone D ==
Pos	Team	Pld	Pts
1	Cuneo	30	50
2	Biellese	30	49
3	Pro Vercelli	30	40
4	Asti	30	38
5	Cavagnaro Genova–Sestri	30	35
6	Rapallo	30	35
7	Casale	30	33
8	Sanremese	30	33
9	Cinzano	30	27
10	Acqui	30	25
11	Entella	30	23
12	Aosta	30	21
13	Savigliano	30	21
14	Derthona (T)	30	18
15	Ivrea (T)	30	17
16	Varazze (Note: Varazze went in wartime break until 1945.) (R, E)	30	15

Source: Panini
(E) Eliminated; (R) Relegated; (T) Qualified, but not yet for the particular phase indicated

== Girone E ==
Pos	Team	Pld	Pts
1	M.A.T.E.R.	28	46
2	Alba Motor Roma	28	43
3	Pontedera	28	37
4	Dop. Spezia	28	33
5	Grosseto	28	33
6	Perugia	28	32
7	Cecina	28	32 (Note: 1 point deducted.)
8	Forte dei Marmi	28	29
9	Orbetello	28	26
10	Empoli	28	24
11	Signe	28	23
12	Carrarese	28	19
13	Aquila Montevarchi	28	17
14	San Giovanni V. (T)	28	13
15	Arezzo (Note: Later readmitted to Serie C.) (T)	28	12
16	Lanciano (E)	0	0

Source: Panini
(E) Eliminated; (T) Qualified, but not yet for the particular phase indicated

== Girone F ==
Pos	Team	Pld	Pts
1	Anconitana–Bianchi	30	53
2	Forlì	30	43
3	Cesena	30	42
4	Panigale	30	39
5	Fano	30	32
6	Rimini	30	32
7	Ravenna	30	31
8	Vis Pesaro	30	30
9	Maceratese	30	28
10	Baracca Lugo	30	27
11	Imolese	30	26
12	Ascoli	30	25
13	Forlimpopoli	30	22
14	Amatori Bologna (T)	30	21
15	Carpi (Note: Later readmitted to Serie C.) (T)	30	19 (Note: 2 points deducted.)
16	Molinella (R)	30	8

Source: Panini
(R) Relegated; (T) Qualified, but not yet for the particular phase indicated

== Girone G ==
Pos	Team	Pld	Pts
1	Salernitana	28	43
2	Borzacchini Terni	28	41
3	Cavese	28	36
4	Ala Littoria Roma	28	35
5	Stabia	28	34
6	Bagnolese	28	32
7	AUSA Foligno	28	28
8	Baratta Battipaglia	28	27
9	V.V.F. Roma	28	26
10	L'Aquila	28	25
11	Savoia	28	24
12	Chieti	28	22
13	Casertana	28	18
14	Civitavecchia (T)	28	16
15	Scafatese (Note: Later readmitted to Serie C.) (T)	28	13

Source: Panini
(T) Qualified, but not yet for the particular phase indicated

== Girone H ==
Pos	Team	Pld	Pts
1	Palermo–Juve	24	38
2	Siracusa	24	35
3	Aviosicula Palermo (E)	24	33
4	V.V.F. Palermo	24	31
5	Lecce	24	30
6	Catania	24	29
7	Cosenza	24	24 (Note: 1 point deducted.)
8	Taranto	24	21
9	Trani	24	18
10	Foggia	24	17
11	Brindisi	24	14
12	Potenza	24	11
13	Molfetta	24	8
14	Armando Diaz (E)	0	0

Source: Panini
(E) Eliminated

== Final rounds ==
=== Girone A ===
Pos	Team	Pld	Pts
1	Cremonese (P)	4	4 (Note: Promoted for goal difference.)
2	M.A.T.E.R. (P)	4	4
3	Pro Gorizia	4	4
4	Salernitana (D)	-	0 (Note: Excluded from the final rounds for illicit.)

Source: Panini
(D) Disqualified; (P) Promoted

=== Girone B ===
Pos	Team	Pld	Pts
1	Palermo–Juve (P)	6	7
2	Anconitana–Bianchi (P)	6	6 (Note: Promoted for goal difference.)
3	Varese	6	6
4	Cuneo	6	5

Source: Panini
(P) Promoted
