= Val Liona =

- Comune
- Comune di Val Liona
- Location within Italy Location within Veneto
- Coordinates: 45°24′36″N 11°28′27″E
- Country: Italy
- Region: Veneto
- Province: Vicenza (VI)
- Frazioni: Campolongo, Grancona, San Gaudenzio, San Germano dei Berici, Spiazzo, Villa del Ferro

Government
  - Mayor: Maurizio Fipponi

Area
  - Total: 27.85 km^{2} (10.75 sq mi)

Population (31 August 2017)
  - Total: 3,047
  - Density: 109.4/km^{2} (283.4/sq mi)
- Demonym: vallionesi
- Time zone: UTC+1 (CET)
  - Summer (DST): UTC+2 (CEST)
- Postal code: 36044
- Dialing code: 0444
- Website: Official website

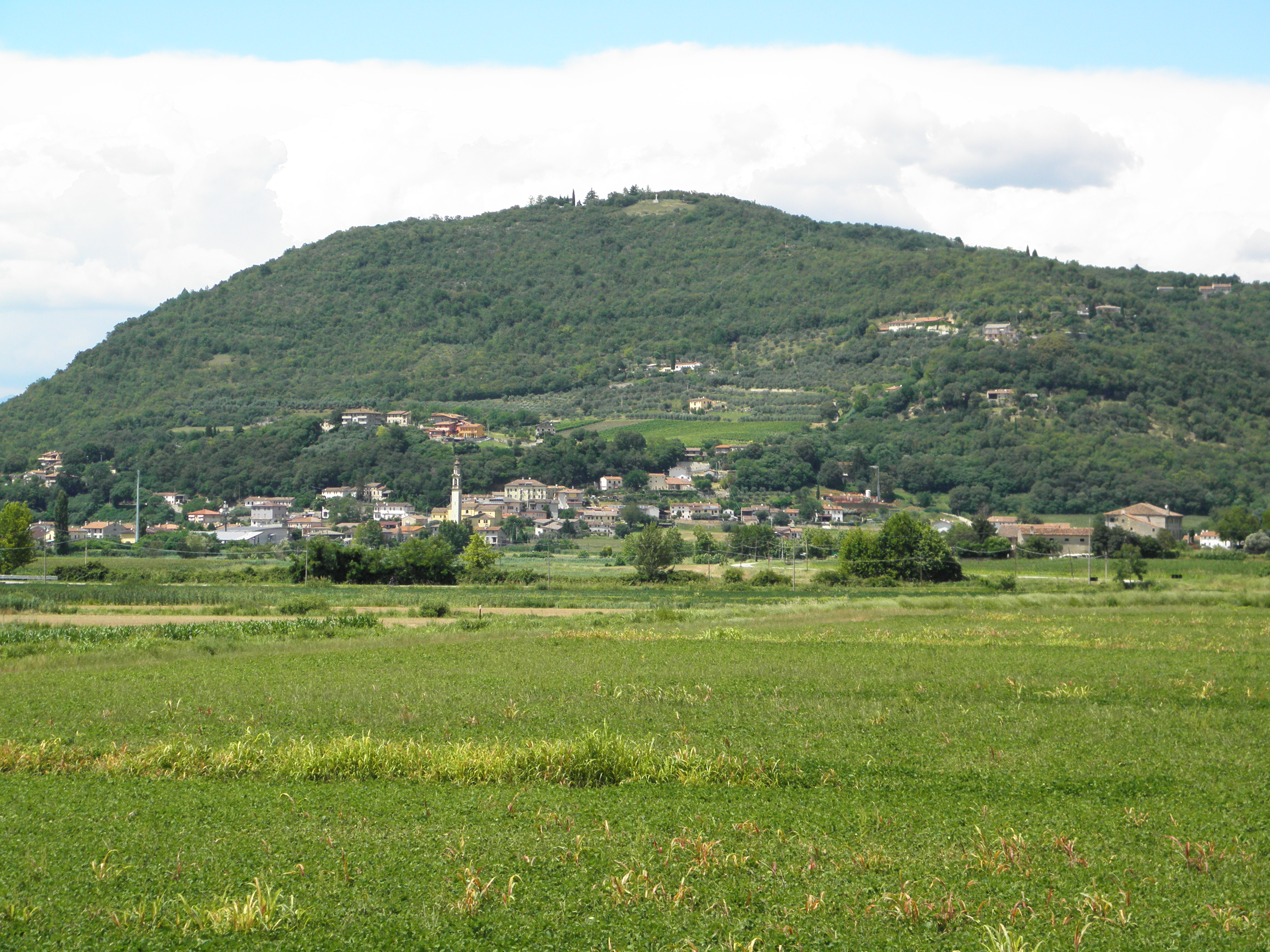
San Germano dei Berici, a hamlet of Val Liona

Val Liona is a commune in the province of Vicenza, Veneto, Italy.

It was established on 17 February 2017 by the merger of Grancona and San Germano dei Berici.

== Sports ==
Boca Ascesa Val Liona is an Italian association football club, based in this city.
