= Grancona =

- Frazione
- Location of Grancona in Italy
- Coordinates: 45°25′N 11°27′E
- Country: Italy
- Region: Veneto
- Province: Vicenza (VI)
- Comune: Val Liona

Area
  - Total: 12 km^{2} (4.6 sq mi)

Population (28 February 2007)
  - Total: 1,888
  - Density: 160/km^{2} (410/sq mi)
- Time zone: UTC+1 (CET)
  - Summer (DST): UTC+2 (CEST)
- Postal code: 36040
- Dialing code: 0444
- Website: Official website

Grancona is a frazione of Val Liona in the province of Vicenza, Veneto, Italy since 2017.

== Sports ==
=== Boca Ascesa Val Liona ===
Boca Ascesa Val Liona is an Italian association football club, based in this city. It currently plays in Eccellenza.

Its colors are black and green.
