= San Germano dei Berici =

- Frazione
- Location of San Germano dei Berici in Italy
- Coordinates: 45°24′N 11°28′E
- Country: Italy
- Region: Veneto
- Province: Vicenza (VI)
- Comune: Val Liona

Area
  - Total: 15 km^{2} (5.8 sq mi)

Population (28 February 2007)
  - Total: 1,167
  - Density: 78/km^{2} (200/sq mi)
- Time zone: UTC+1 (CET)
  - Summer (DST): UTC+2 (CEST)
- Postal code: 36040
- Dialing code: 0444

San Germano dei Berici is a frazione of Val Liona in the province of Vicenza, Veneto, Italy since 2017. It is east of SP500.

== Sources ==
- (Google Maps)
