= Daniel Cappelletti =

Italian footballer (born 1991)

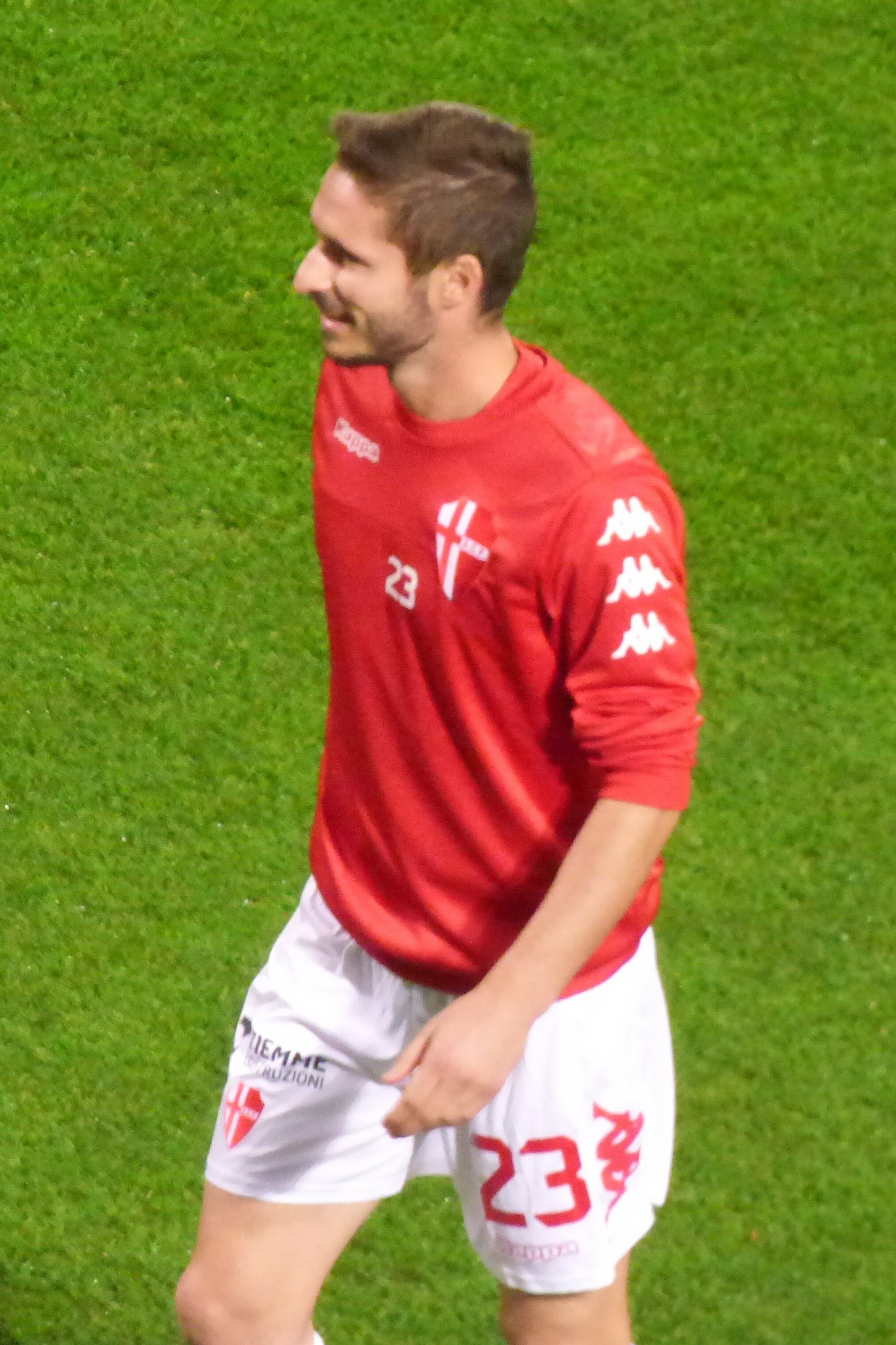
- Cappelletti in 2018

Personal information
- Date of birth: 9 October 1991 (age 35)
- Place of birth: Cantù, Italy
- Height: 1.81 m (5 ft 11 1/2 in)
- Position: Defender

Team information
- Current team: Treviso
- Number: 8

Youth career
- –2005: Como
- Cantù San Paolo
- 2009–2010: Palermo

Senior career*
| Years | Team | Apps | (Gls) |
| 2010–2014 | Palermo | 0 | (0) |
| 2010–2011 | → Padova (loan) | 3 | (0) |
| 2011–2012 | → Sassuolo (loan) | 0 | (0) |
| 2012 | → Juve Stabia (loan) | 3 | (0) |
| 2012–2014 | → Südtirol (loan) | 52 | (2) |
| 2014–2016 | Cittadella | 59 | (3) |
| 2016–2019 | Padova | 100 | (8) |
| 2019–2023 | Vicenza | 79 | (0) |
| 2023–2024 | Brindisi | 15 | (0) |
| 2024–2026 | Trento | 60 | (2) |
| 2026 | Vicenza | 8 | (1) |
| 2026– | Treviso | 1 | (0) |

International career
| 2011 | Italy U-21 B | 3 | (0) |
- * Club domestic league appearances and goals as of 23 August 2026

Daniel Cappelletti (born 9 October 1991) is an Italian professional footballer who plays as a defender for Serie C Group A club Treviso.

Cappelletti started his early career as a full-back, but transformed into centre-back with Südtirol.

== Biography ==
Born in Cantù, Lombardy, Cappelletti started his career at Como and then Cantù San Paolo. In January 2009 he was signed by Sicily club Palermo. He was a regular member of Primavera under-20 team in 2009–10 season.

In August 2010 he left for Serie B club Padova along with Davide Succi, with option to buy half of the registration rights for €400,000 and €500,000 respectively. Cappelletti made his debut on 2 October, replacing José Ángel Crespo at half time. That season he played 3 games in the Italian second division, substituted Crespo twice and left-back Trevor Trevisan once. He made his only start in 2010–11 Coppa Italia. That match Padova used a 3–4–3 formation and he was one of the 3 defenders.

On 1 July 2011, he left for another second division club Sassuolo along with Karim Laribi. However, he did not play any match for the first match but played for Sassuolo's Primavera (literally "Spring") team as overage player. On 5 January 2012, he moved to fellow second division club Juve Stabia.

On 13 July 2012, Palermo agreed a loan deal with Lega Pro Prima Divisione club South Tyrol, where he was a centre-back. On 11 July the temporary deal was renewed.

On 4 July 2019, he signed a 2-year contract with Vicenza.

On 2 September 2023, Cappelletti moved to Brindisi on a two-year contract.

On 1 February 2024, Cappelletti moved to Trento until the end of the 2023–24 season.

=== Representative team ===
Cappelletti was selected by Lombardy regional "student" team for 2007 Coppa Nazionale Primavera, a tournament compete by representative teams of Italian regions. The team finished as the second in the Group 3 and eliminated. He did not get any international caps until spotted by Italy under-21 Serie B representative team in 2011, where he played as a left-back against Serbian First League Selection twice and Russian First League Selection once.
