= Otello Trombetta =

Italian footballer

Personal information
- Date of birth: October 13, 1915
- Place of birth: Rome, Italy
- Position: Striker

Senior career*
Years	Team	Apps	(Gls)
1934–1935	Savoia Roma		
1935–1936	Roma	4	(1)
1936–1937	L'Aquila	16	(1)
1937–1940	M.A.T.E.R.		
1940–1944	Alba Roma		
1947–1948	Tirrenia Roma		
- * Club domestic league appearances and goals

Otello Trombetta (October 13, 1915 – unknown) was an Italian professional football player.

He played four games, scoring one goal in the Serie A 1935–36 season for A.S. Roma.
