= Filippo De Col =

Italian footballer

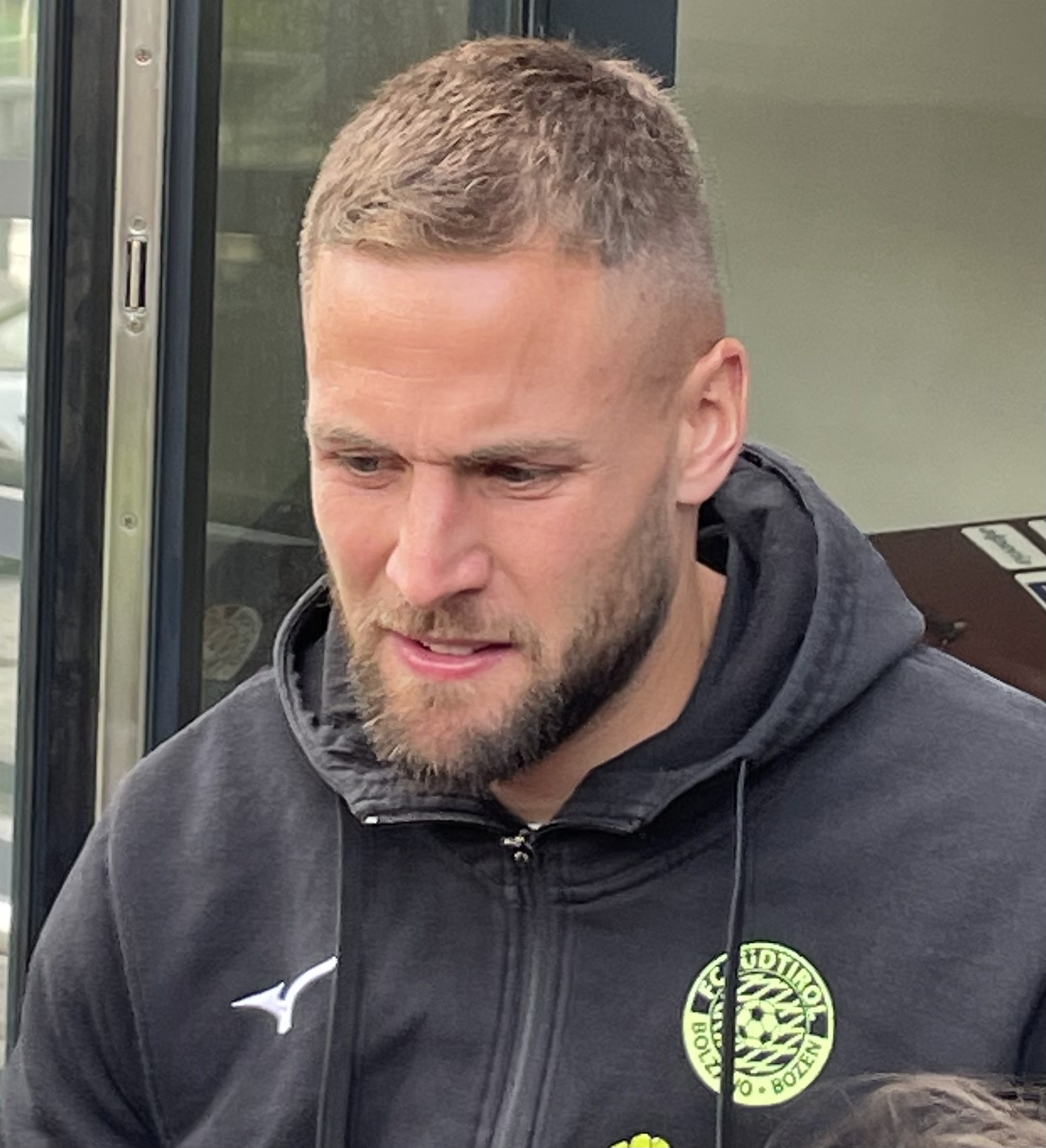

Personal information
- Date of birth: 28 October 1993 (age 33)
- Place of birth: Agordo, Italy
- Height: 1.84 m (6 ft 0 in)
- Position: Right back

Team information
- Current team: Arezzo
- Number: 26

Youth career
- 2009–2011: Milan

Senior career*
Years	Team	Apps	(Gls)
2011–2012	Legnago Salus	31	(2)
2012–2013	Virtus Entella	31	(2)
2013–2014	Verona	0	(0)
2013–2014	→ Virtus Lanciano (loan)	36	(0)
2014–2019	Spezia	110	(0)
2015–2016	→ Cesena (loan)	4	(0)
2020–2021	Virtus Entella	25	(0)
2021–2023	Südtirol	68	(3)
2023–2025	Vicenza	57	(2)
2025–	Arezzo	22	(1)

International career
2013–2014	Italy U20	3	(0)
2014	Italy U21	2	(0)
- * Club domestic league appearances and goals as of 30 April 2026

Filippo De Col (born 28 October 1993) is an Italian professional footballer who plays as a right defender for Serie B club Arezzo.

== Career ==
De Col started his professional career at Milan, leaving the club in 2011, signing with Legnago Salus. After an outstanding season in Serie D, he then signed with Virtus Entella in July 2012.

On 1 July 2013 De Col signed with Serie A-bound Verona, being immediately loaned to Virtus Lanciano, in Serie B.

De Col and colleague Claudio Terzi were involved in a WhatsApp match-fixing scandal along with Emanuele Calaiò at the end of the 2017–18 season.

On 2 September 2019, his contract with Spezia was dissolved by mutual consent.

On 23 January 2020, he returned to Virtus Entella, signing a contract until the end of the 2019–20 season with an extension option.

On 17 June 2021, he joined Südtirol on a two-year contract.

After two seasons at Südtirol, De Col moved to Vicenza on contract until 30 June 2025.
