= ASD Boca Ascesa Val Liona =

Italian football club

Boca Ascesa
- Full name: Associazione Sportiva Dilettantistica Boca Ascesa Val Liona
- Founded: 1969; 57 years ago as, A.C. Grancona Calcio; 1908; 118 years ago as, A.S.D. Nuovo Calcio Grancona; 2012; 14 years ago as, A.S.D. Boca Ascesa Val Liona (takeover)
- Dissolved: 2015
- Ground: Stadio Comunale di Grancona, Val Liona, Italy
- Capacity: 2,000
Home colours	Away colours

A.S.D. Boca Ascesa Val Liona is an Italian association football club located in Val Liona, Veneto.

== History ==
The origins of football in Grancona go back to 1969 when was founded A.C. Grancona Calcio that was refounded in 2005 as A.S.D. Nuovo Calcio Grancona.

In summer 2012 after the acquisition of the sports title of Eccellenza club Nuova Valdagno, based in Valdagno, the club changed its name to Boca Ascesa Val Liona.

== Colors and badge ==
Its colors are black and orange.
