= US Fiumana =

Italian football club

Fiumana
- Full name: Unione Sportiva Fiumana
- Founded: 2 September 1926; 98 years ago
- Dissolved: 25 April 1945; 80 years ago, rebranded as S.C.F. Quarnero and later as HNK Rijeka
- Ground: Stadio Comunale del Littorio
- Capacity: 8,000
Home colours	Away colours

Unione Sportiva Fiumana or U.S. Fiumana was an Italian football club based in the present-day Croatian city of Rijeka and the predecessor of HNK Rijeka. The club was active between 1926 and 1945, at the time when the city was part of the Kingdom of Italy and was commonly referred to by its Italian name Fiume. The club's home was the present-day Stadion Kantrida, which was at the time called Stadio Comunale del Littorio.

During its existence the club competed in the Italian league system, spending most of the time in the second and third levels, finishing their last season as 4th in Group A of the 1942–43 Serie C. Between 1943 and 1946 the club continued to play under the Fiumana name and in 1946 its management decided to rebrand the side into S.C.F. Quarnero in order to be able to take part in the first Yugoslav championship.

== History ==
The club was founded in 1926 as Unione Sportiva Fiumana after the forced merger of Gloria Fiume into Olympia Fiume operated by the fascist authorities in line with the reorganisation of Italian football clubs occurred with the publishing of the Viareggio charter. Fiumana played in the First Division (Prima divisione), which was the second level of the Italian Football Championship, and reached the National Division (Divisione Nazionale), the first level of Italian football in 1928. The same year it also won the prestigious Federal Cup that substituted the Coppa Italia in those years. After 1929, it competed in Serie B in the 1929–1930 and 1941–1942 seasons.

== Honours ==
- Serie C:
  - Winners (1): 1940–41
- Coppa Federale
  - Winners (1): 1927–28
