= Thomas Sandon =

Italian footballer

Personal information
- Date of birth: 11 July 2003 (age 23)
- Place of birth: Abano Terme, Italy
- Height: 1.85 m (6 ft 1 in)
- Position: Left-back

Team information
- Current team: Vicenza
- Number: 73

Youth career
- Vicenza

Senior career*
Years	Team	Apps	(Gls)
2021–	Vicenza	116	(3)

International career^{‡}
2021–2022	Italy U19	7	(0)
- * Club domestic league appearances and goals as of 29 April 2026 ‡ National team caps and goals as of 21 November 2021

Thomas Sandon (born 11 July 2003) is an Italian professional football player who plays for Vicenza.

== Club career ==
Having come through the youth ranks of Vicenza, Thomas Sandon made his professional debut for the Venetian team on the 3 October 2021, replacing Daniel Cappelletti in a 4–2 away Serie B win against Pordenone.

== International career ==
Sandon is a youth international for Italy, having become a regular with the under-19 since August 2021.
