= Filippo Alessio =

Italian footballer

Personal information
- Date of birth: 24 December 2004 (age 21)
- Place of birth: Montebelluna, Italy
- Height: 1.89 m (6 ft 2 in)
- Position: Forward

Team information
- Current team: Vicenza
- Number: 24

Youth career
- 2018–2021: Vicenza
- 2023: → Empoli (loan)
- 2023–2024: → Roma (loan)

Senior career*
Years	Team	Apps	(Gls)
2021–	Vicenza	31	(1)
2023	→ Empoli (loan)	0	(0)
2023–2024	→ Roma (loan)	0	(0)
2024–2025	→ Atalanta U23 (loan)	32	(6)

International career^{‡}
2021	Italy U18	3	(0)
- * Club domestic league appearances and goals as of 29 April 2026 ‡ National team caps and goals as of 13 November 2021

Filippo Alessio (born 24 December 2004) is an Italian professional footballer who plays as a forward for Serie B club Vicenza.

== Club career ==
After joining Vicenza in 2018 and coming through their youth ranks, Alessio made his professional debut for the club on 30 November 2021, coming in as a substitute during a Serie B match against Benevento. He collected two other senior appearances throughout the season, as Vicenza eventually got relegated to Serie C.

On 14 July 2022, Alessio officially extended his contract with the club until 2026.

On 31 January 2023, Alessio was loaned by Empoli for their Under-19 squad, with an option to buy.

On 24 July 2023, Alessio was loaned to Roma, with an option to buy.

On 30 August 2024, Alessio moved on loan to Atalanta with an option to buy, he was assigned to their reserve squad Atalanta U23.

== International career ==
Alessio has represented Italy at youth international level, having played for the under-18 national team.
