= Nocerina =

Nocerina may refer to:

- A.S.G. Nocerina, was an Italian football club based in Nocera Inferiore, founded in 1910 and folded in 2015, also known as "Associazione Giovanile Nocerina 1910"
- A.S.D. Nocerina 1910, is an Italian football club that relocated from Campagna to Nocera Inferiore in 2015
- diminutive form of Nocera Inferiore
