= AC Cantù GS San Paolo =

Italian football club

Cantù San Paolo
- Full name: Associazione Calcio Cantù; Gruppo Sportivo San Paolo; Associazione Sportiva Dilettantistica
- Founded: 2000
- Ground: Stadio Comunale San Paolo, Cantù, Italy
- Capacity: 1,000
- Chairman: Filippo Carlo Maria Confalonieri
- Manager
- League: Eccellenza Lombardia
- 2011–12: Serie D/A, 18th (relegated)
Home colours	Away colours

Associazione Calcio Cantù Gruppo Sportivo San Paolo Associazione Sportiva Dilettantistica is an Italian association football club, based in Cantù, Lombardy. It currently plays in Eccellenza Lombardia.

== History ==
=== Cantù San Paolo ===
A.C. Cantù G.S. San Paolo A.S.D. was founded in the summer of 2000, with the merger between A.C. Cantù (founded in 1910 and playing in Seconda Categoria Lombardy) and G.S. San Paolo (founded in 1985 and playing in Prima Categoria Lombardy). The team took part in the Prima Categoria and its second attempt to conquer the Promozione.

In the 2008–2009 season, Cantù San Paolo was promoted to Serie D by beating Fondi 2–1 in the national play-off final. In the 2011–2012 season, it was relegated to Eccellenza.

=== The football in Cantù before the merger ===
==== A.C. Cantù ====
The origins of football in Cantù go back to 1910, when Club Sportivo Canturino was founded. The field of play and training was the stage of Milan. After playing for three years with the teams at Como Ulice, which was affiliated to the two dispute FIGC and the Quarta Divisione championship, gaining a second place in 1924–1925, which earned him admission to the Terza Divisione in 1925–1926.

It got the best placement in the season 1926–1927, finishing in second place with three points from Seregno, but suddenly stopped the activity, remaining idle for a season. In season 1928–1929, under the name Dopolavoro Cantù, they burned all stages: in the space of three seasons, they played in Prima Categoria (1932–1933).

It retired at the end of the 1933–1934 First Division championship for financial reasons, until reappearing in the Lombardy regional championships with the return of young people after the end of the war in Ethiopia. It then started affiliating with the new name of Associazione Calcio Cantù.

===== The years of Serie C =====
The forties are the golden era of football in the town of Brianza. The team, on a regular grenade, disputes the Serie C, participating in the Cup three times in Italy. The best result was achieved in the domestic cup in the 1939–1940 season, when it was eliminated from the Biellese to the third qualifying round after overcoming Codogno and Caratese.

===== The post-war period and the first failure =====
In 1960, the team, due to economic failures, was forced to abandon the competitive activity.

===== The restart with F.C. Cantù =====
The following year, he founded a new club, the Football Club Cantù, whose playing field is always on the green rectangle of Milan. The sailing team championships in the Prima Categoria and Seconda Categoria (current leagues Promozione and Eccellenza) have been held for many years.

===== The arrival of Mobil Girgi and return to Serie D =====
In 1971, the Mobil Girgi company, engaged in the furnishing sector, took over the company, which became F.C. Arredi Girgi Cantù, and paved the way for the return of Cantù to competitive football levels. In the season 1972–1973, they won the Prima Categoria and were promoted to Serie D.

During the first year of Serie D (1973–1974), Cantù finished 13th, with two points more than the relegation places. The next year (season 1974–1975), the team was fired from the championship duel with Pro Patria and freedom for promotion to Serie C; finally, the promotion was lost. Direct comparisons both ended in a draw, fatal to the team's 1–0 defeat. Cantù was promoted on May 14 in Lodi during the recovery against the Fanfulla, which gave mathematics the chance to promotion for Cantù. They then separated by three points, with two matches to play. The following season was the last in Serie D: the second-lowest disappointing season, and it initiated the decline of society. The only positive of this disappointing season was the debut of a player who then won the Scudetto with the Inter shirt: Gianfranco Matteoli.

===== Decline =====
From that moment, because of the abandonment of the family Girgi for political conflicts, Cantù began an inexorable decline. It led to sinking to the bottom in just a few years, playing so many leagues between the Prima Categoria and Seconda Categoria.

==== G.S. San Paolo ====
G.S. San Paolo was founded in 1985, and towards the end of the nineties, it surpassed the city society of A.C. Cantù, playing in Prima Categoria.

== Colors and badge ==
The team's colors are all-dark red.
