= ASD Cecina =

Italian football club

Cecina
- Full name: Associazione Sportiva Dilettante Cecina
- Founded: 1924
- Ground: Stadio Loris Rossetti, Cecina, Italy
- Capacity: 2,000
- Chairman: Francesco Paolo Manno
- Manager: Roberto Galbiati
- League: Serie D/D
- 2008–09: Serie D/E, 10th
| Home colours | Away colours |

Associazione Sportiva Dilettante Cecina is an Italian association football club located in Cecina, Tuscany. It currently plays in Serie D. Its colors are red and blue.
