= History of Atalanta BC =

History of an Italian football club

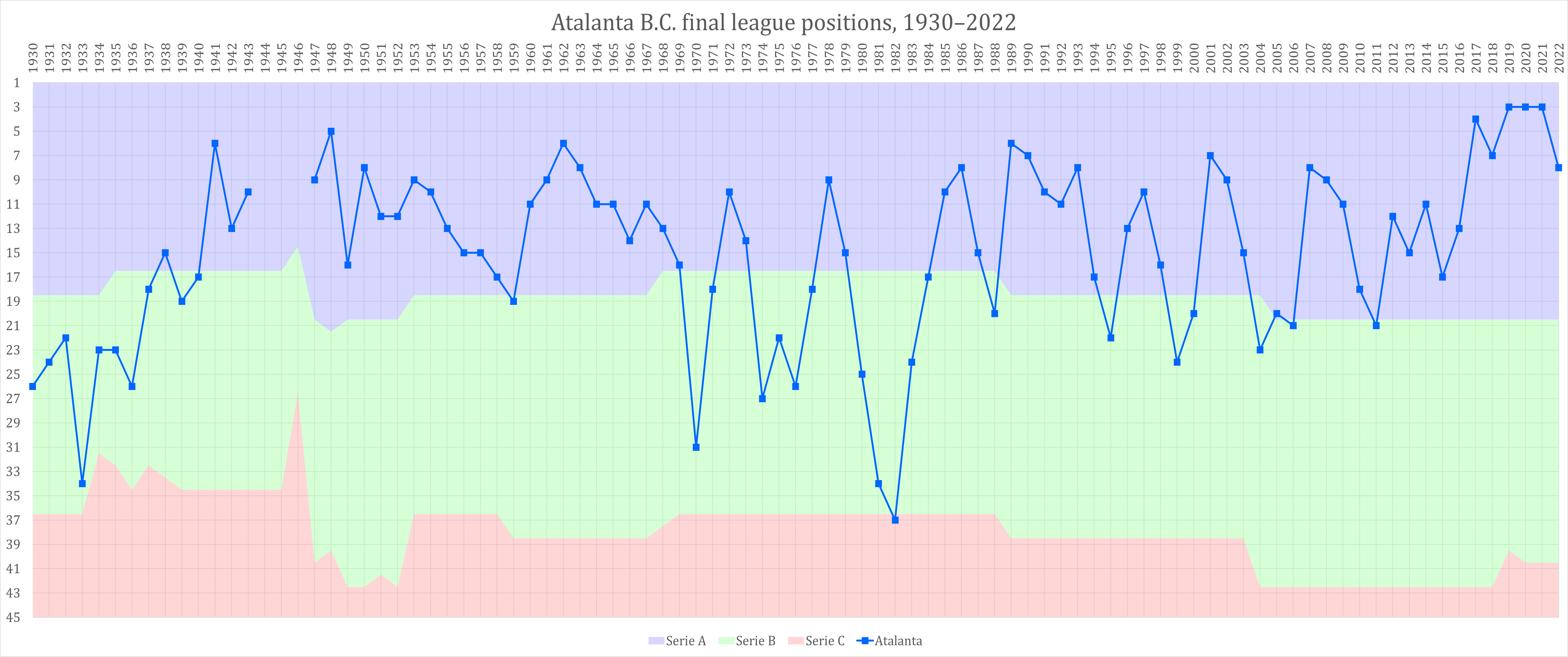
Performances of Atalanta in the Italian league since the first season of a unified Serie A

The history of Atalanta Bergamasca Calcio covers over 110 years of Italian professional football club Atalanta BC, commonly referred to as Atalanta (or its nicknames, La Dea, the Orobici, and the Nerazzurri), from its founding in 1907 to the present day. Atalanta is based in Bergamo, Lombardy, Italy and has played its home matches at the Gewiss Stadium since 1928. It currently competes in Serie A, the top tier of the Italian football league system.

Atalanta was founded in 1907 by Liceo Classico Paolo Sarpi students in Bergamo and was named after the Greek mythological athlete of the same name. The club merged with another club also based in Bergamo in 1920, adopting its current name (Atalanta Bergamasca Calcio) and colors (black and blue) after this merger. Atalanta spent much of the 1920s and 1930s in the second division, reaching Serie A for the first time in 1937. The club then enjoyed nearly three decades in Serie A (1940–1969), only missing out in 1958–59. In the following years, the club experienced more movements between the top two divisions, even spending one season (1981–82) in the third division, though returned to the top tiers and qualified for several UEFA competitions—a European Cup Winners' Cup and two UEFA Cups—between 1987 and 1990 under coach Emiliano Mondonico. In the 1990s and 2000s, Atalanta again moved several times between Serie A and Serie B. The club was most recently promoted in 2011 and has been in Serie A for twelve consecutive seasons since then. Between 2017 and 2025, under coach Gian Piero Gasperini, the club enjoyed its best ever league finishes and participated in the UEFA Champions League and UEFA Europa League.

As of the 2024–25 season, Atalanta has spent a total of 64 seasons in Serie A, 28 seasons in Serie B (winning it five times), (Note: The club also won the Prima Divisione, the predecessor to Serie B, in 1927–28, for a total of six first-place finishes in the second division.) and only one in Serie C. Atalanta has spent the most seasons in the top flight of any Italian club not based in a regional capital; because of these consistent performances, as well as Serie B titles and performances in continental competitions, the club is sometimes called the Regina delle provinciali ("queen of the provincial clubs"), though has never won the Scudetto. Atalanta has won two major trophies in its history: the Coppa Italia in 1963 and the Europa League in 2024. The club reached the Coppa Italia final on five other occasions (in 1987, 1996, 2019, 2021, and 2024) and participated in UEFA competitions in eleven seasons in total; prior to winning the Europa League in 2024, the club's best finishes were the quarterfinals of the Champions League in 2020 and semifinals of the now-defunct UEFA Cup Winners' Cup in 1988.

== Early years (1900–1920) ==
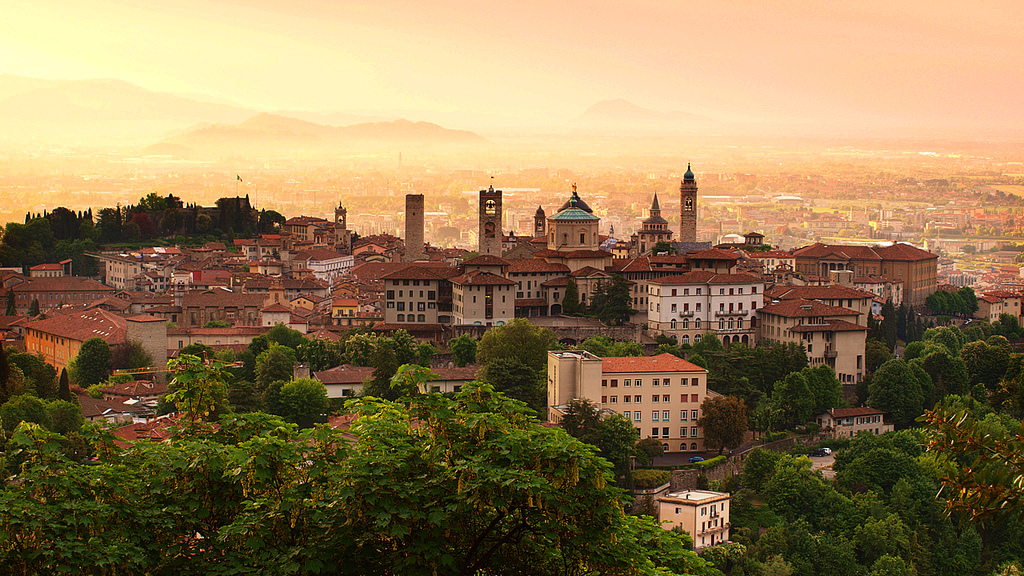
Bergamo's historical Città Alta

At the turn of the 20th century, the main sporting associations in Bergamo were the Società Bergamasca di Ginnastica e Scherma (also called simply Bergamasca), founded in 1878, and the Giovane Orobia, founded in 1901. These were both located in the Città Alta (the historical "high city", situated at the base of the Bergamo Alps, which begin immediately north of the city), where they were less accessible to residents of the Città Bassa ("low city"; borgo). The origins of the modern club can be traced back to a split from the Giovane Orobia with the intent of creating a sports club in the Borgo.

The first football association based in Bergamo was called Foot Ball Club Bergamo, founded by Swiss emigrants on 15 October 1904. It participated in regional championships (organized by the Italian Football Federation) until it was disbanded in 1911; its remnants were absorbed into rival sports club Bergamasca, which would establish a football team in 1913.

The club was founded on 17 October 1907 by Liceo Classico Paolo Sarpi students Eugenio Urio, Giulio and Ferruccio Amati, Alessandro Forlini, and Giovanni Roberti. A day later, they unanimously agreed to name the club Atalanta after the female athlete of the same name from Greek mythology, giving rise to the name Società Bergamasca di Ginnastica e Sports Atletici Atalanta. The new club immediately established a football team, though it would not be recognized by the Italian Football Federation (FIGC) until 1914. Prior to this recognition and inauguration of a playing field, the club only played friendly matches; these were played first at the Piazza d'Armi and later in the Campo di Marte in the city center. The club's first playing field was then established on the Via Maglio del Lotto in Bergamo, near the railway connecting Bergamo to Milan; it had a seated capacity of 1000 spectators.

Football director and haberdasher Pietro Carimanti strongly pushed for the club's recognition by the FIGC. During this time, the club wore a black and white kit. The club also actively competed in other sports such as gymnastics, fencing, cycling, and swimming. Three athletes from Atalanta participated in the Olympic Games: Guido Calvi and 1911 Italian 5000-meter champion Alfonso Orlando participated in the 1912 Olympics in Stockholm, while Costante Lussana, also an Italian 5000-meter champion, participated in the 1920 Olympics in Antwerp.

Following recognition from the FIGC, the club participated in the 1914–15 Promozione, then the second-highest level of the Italian football league system. In its first competitive season, the club finished second in its group and finished fourth in the final round.

During the suspension of official sporting events following the outbreak of World War I, which Italy entered in 1915, Atalanta took part in several friendly tournaments. These included the Coppa Lissone, in which host club Pro Lissone defeated Atalanta 2–1 in the final, the 1916 Coppa Lombardia, and the 1916–17 Coppa Legnano. Because the first-team players had gone into battle, these competitions were contested by youth players. Later during the war, the club was forced to sell the land containing its field amid economic problems. On 11 November 1918, a week after the war ended, former footballer Antonio Festa (who, before the war, played for Bergamasca), founded the Circolo Studentesco (Student Circle) to rejuvenate enthusiasm towards football in the city.

At the beginning of 1919, Atalanta resumed its pre-war activities, though with a depleted squad containing only eleven players (two goalkeepers and nine outfield players). To field a complete team, goalkeeper Francesco Aragano volunteered to fill the vacancy in central midfield. However, the club was temporarily without a field to play competitive matches, having sold its land during the war. As a solution, entrepreneur and philanthropist Betty Ambiveri sold the Campo della Clementina (Clementina field), an older venue in Seriate that hosted sporting events such as cycling, to the club. The new field was inaugurated as the Atalanta Stadium and hosted 14,000 spectators in its first match against La Dominante of Genoa.

The club then prepared to challenge for admission to the Prima Categoria, the top tier of the Italian football league system. However, the Italian Football Federation announced that it would only allow one club from Bergamo to participate in the 1919–20 Prima Categoria. Both Atalanta and Bergamasca were eligible, though because a strong rivalry existed between the clubs, a competitive playoff was necessary to determine which club would participate. The playoff match was held on 5 October 1919 in Brescia; Atalanta won the match 2–0. Atalanta went on to finish third in Lombardy Group B, securing a place in the next season's Prima Categoria.

In February 1920, a merger between the two Bergamo clubs nevertheless occurred after an assembly; the new club was named Atalanta Bergamasca di Ginnastica e Scherma 1907, shortened to Atalanta Bergamasca Calcio. The merger was completed on 4 April 1920 and Enrico Luchsinger became the new club's first president. Following the merger, the team's colors were also decided: the black and white of Atalanta and the blue and white of Bergamasca were combined into a blue and black (nerazzurri) kit. The club retains the name and colors resulting from this merger to the present day.

== Between the wars and Serie A debut (1920–1940) ==
In the first season after the merger, Atalanta finished fourth in Lombardy Group E. The next season, Atalanta finished third in the group won by Cremonese in the FIGC championship (there were two top-level championships that season following the formation of the secessionist Italian Football Confederation (CCI); the CCI dissolved a year later). At the end of the 1921–22 season, Atalanta played its first match against a foreign team, a 2–2 draw in a friendly against Swiss club Aarau.

In the 1922–23 season, Atalanta won its group in the Seconda Divisione, though the club was not promoted due to the FIGC restructuring the league system. Despite this, the club received a cup from the Regional Committee for its group victory and advanced to the national finals, though lost over two legs to Carpi. After another third-place finish in its Seconda Divisione group, Atalanta finished third-to-last in the 1924–25 Seconda Divisione and risked relegation, saved only following a double playoff against Trevigliese and Canottieri Lecco.

In 1925, Cesare Lovati was hired as the club's first true professional coach. The club also welcomed its first foreign players at this time, center-forward Gedeon Eugen Lukács and mezzala Jeno Hauser, both Hungarian. Lukács scored 13 goals in 20 games that season and finished top scorer of the club, while Hauser scored 7 goals in 19 games. The club finished third in its group, three points behind group winner Biellese.

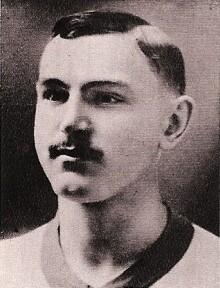
Imre Payer (shown here in 1913), who coached Atalanta three times during the 1920s and 1930s

At the end of the season, in 1926, the FIGC changed its rules to only allow one foreign player per squad instead of two. This prompted the club to keep Lukács (sending Hauser back to Hungary) for the next Prima Divisione season. (Note: This was the second Italian tier, known as the Seconda Divisione from 1921 to 1926. The top flight (highest tier), known as the Prima Divisione during this period, was renamed Divisione Nazionale.) In the 1926–27 Prima Divisione, Lukács scored 20 goals in 17 games, including five in a 6–0 home win against Monfalconese, which remains the most goals scored by a single Atalanta player in a match. This helped the club finish second in its group with 26 points, one point behind group winner Pro Patria. With this result, Atalanta qualified for a promotion playoff, though was defeated 6–1 by Fiumana in Rijeka and thus remained in the second division.

The club hired Hungarian coach Imre Payer, its first foreign coach, in 1927 to try to challenge for promotion to the top flight. However, this appointment required the departure of Lukács, as only one foreigner was allowed in the club (in any position—player or coaching staff) per the FIGC rules. Despite his departure, the club was able to achieve good results, winning its Prima Divisione group with 30 points in 18 matches. By winning its group, Atalanta qualified for the national second division finals against Bari, Biellese, and Pistoiese. Bari was eliminated from the playoffs following losses to Biellese and Pistoiese, though the remaining three teams were tied, requiring a second round of playoffs. Biellese subsequently withdrew, thereby forfeiting its matches; the Prima Divisione winner would therefore be decided in a single playoff match on neutral ground between Atalanta and Pistoiese. Atalanta won this match 3–0, winning the Prima Divisione (its first second division triumph) and promotion to the top flight.

In 1928, a new stadium was built for the club on the Viale Margherita (now the Viale Giulio Cesare), in the Borgo Santa Caterina neighborhood; Atalanta plays its home matches at this stadium to the present day. The new stadium was much larger than the Clementina stadium, with a capacity of 12,000 spectators, and also included a running track. The stadium was originally named after fascist Mario Brumana; this was common naming practice in fascist Italy. On 1 November 1928, the new stadium hosted its first unofficial match, in which Atalanta defeated Triestina 4–2. As Prime Minister Benito Mussolini desired a more lavish opening, the official opening match was played on 23 December 1928 against La Dominante Genova, in front of over 14,000 spectators. Atalanta won this match 2–0.

During the 1928–29 season, youth goalkeeper Carlo Ceresoli made his top-flight debut at age 18 under new coach Aldo Cevenini. After several more years in Bergamo, he would move to Inter Milan, and win the 1938 FIFA World Cup with the Italy national team. At the end of the season, however, Atalanta did not finish among the top eight teams in its group and was not admitted to Serie A, the new single-group Italian top flight contested by 16 teams, for the 1929–30 season. Atalanta instead was admitted to the 1929–30 edition of the new second tier, Serie B.

Hungarian player-manager József Viola was in charge for the next few seasons. The club almost reached promotion to Serie A several times, coming closest with a sixth-place finish in 1931, five points behind promoted Bari and Fiorentina. During these years, the club featured players such as Vittorio Casati, who has the most appearances of any Atalanta player in Serie B (202); Francesco Simonetti, future assistant coach; and Luigi Tentorio, who would hold various management positions at the club as well as become Italy national team head coach in the two decades following World War II. At the end of the 1931–32 season, the club faced economic problems and almost failed to register for the championship. This necessitated the sale of Ceresoli to Inter for 100,000 lire. The club's struggles continued after this sale, though; the club only escaped relegation to the third tier after the FIGC expanded Serie B to include more teams in 1933 (no teams were relegated from Serie B at the end of that season).

The club finished in the middle of Serie B for the next few seasons, also winning a Coppa Disciplina—a trophy awarded for fair play—in the 1935–36 season. On 7 November 1935, Atalanta played its first ever match in the Coppa Italia, a 2–0 home defeat to Viareggio. In the 1936–37 season, under the guidance of new coach Ottavio Barbieri, Atalanta achieved its first promotion to Serie A with a second-place finish in Serie B.

Atalanta made its Serie A debut on 12 September 1937 in a 0–0 away draw against Genoa. A week later, the club played its first home game in Serie A against Juventus at the Brumana stadium in front of over 15,000 spectators, losing 1–0. Despite initial enthusiasm, the club would only win four matches throughout the season, all of them at home. This led the club to a second-to-last-place finish and relegation to Serie B. Although this relegation led to the sale of midfielder Giuseppe Bonomi to Roma for 120,000 lire, the team of this period also featured midfielder Severo Cominelli, Atalanta's second-highest scorer (behind only Cristiano Doni) with 62 career goals for the club.

Following this relegation, it did not take long for Atalanta to return to the top flight. The club narrowly missed promotion in 1939 because of an inferior goal quotient (Note: Goal quotient is the ratio of goals scored to goals conceded; it is not to be confused with goal difference, which is the difference of goals scored and goals conceded.) to Venezia, with whom Atalanta was tied for second place. The next season, president Nardo Bertoncini appointed new coach Ivo Fiorentini. Atalanta went on to finish first in the 1939–40 Serie B and achieve promotion to Serie A; this triumph came without a single defeat at home and 25 goals in 31 appearances from striker Giovanni Gaddoni, the most by an Atalanta player in a single league season.

== Serie A consistency (1940–1959) ==
Upon returning to the top flight in the 1940–41 season, Atalanta achieved its first ever victory against Juventus (3–0) and also defeated reigning champion Bologna en route to a sixth-place finish. By virtue of its performances this season, Atalanta earned its long-standing reputation as the Regina delle provinciali ("queen of the provincial clubs"). Atalanta continued in Serie A under Hungarian coach János Nehadoma until the league was suspended because of World War II in 1943. Despite the sales of several key players, and a 9–1 loss against Torino (the worst in the club's history), Nehadoma's team achieved a 13th-place finish in 1942 and a ninth-place finish in 1943.

Italy was split in two parts after the fall of the fascist regime in 1943 and the onset of the Italian Civil War, rendering a unified national championship impossible until the 1945–46 season. Despite this suspension, in early 1944, a regional championship was held in Northern Italy—the Campionato Alta Italia—in which Atalanta participated but did not reach the final stage. After the war ended, Lombardy senator Daniele Turani invested in the club to repair financial losses during the war. Atalanta finished mid-table in its first post-war season, during which two-time world champion Giuseppe Meazza played for the club. As fascism no longer existed in Italy after the end of the war, the stadium was renamed the Stadio Comunale ("City Stadium"). Upon reopening of borders in Europe, the club was once again able to recruit foreign players; Hungarian midfielder Mihály Kincses and attacker Sándor Olajkár played for Atalanta during the 1946–47 season, the former scoring 9 goals in 21 appearances and the latter making 7 appearances without scoring. Over the next few years, the club played consistently in the top flight and achieved some good results against metropolitan teams, earning a reputation as the provinciale terribile (terrible provincial team). These included four victories in eight matches between 1945 and 1949 against the Grande Torino, the Torino team that won the Scudetto each of these seasons. In the 1947–48 Serie A, Atalanta achieved a fifth-place finish under coach Ivo Fiorentini (who returned for a second spell at the club). This campaign included victories over the Grande Torino, Milan, Bologna, and Inter (3–0 at San Siro), and was the club's highest league finish until 2017. As a result of Atalanta's performances this season, goalkeeper Giuseppe Casari and midfielder Giacomo Mari became the first Atalanta players to be called up to the Italy national team; they formed part of the squads for the 1948 Summer Olympics in London and 1950 FIFA World Cup.

The following season proved to be much harder for Atalanta. Fiorentini resigned in March 1949 after the team obtained three points in seven matches and was replaced by Carlo Carcano. following this managerial change, the club only secured Serie A safety on the final matchday. For the 1949–50 season, Giovanni Varglien was appointed as the club's new coach. He implemented changes to the squad and system following controversy and doubts from the previous season. Also in summer 1949, Cominelli left the club for SPAL and Mari left for Juventus. Mari's replacement, Stefano Angeleri, arrived at Atalanta from Juventus; he would later captain the team and accumulate 324 appearances in 11 years. The FIGC also revised its rules to allow three foreigners per squad. This allowed the club to sign Danish forwards Jørgen Sørensen and Karl Hansen, in addition to already-present Swedish midfielder Bertil Nordahl.

Under Varglien, Atalanta was at the top of the Serie A table after the first two matches, the first of which was a 6–2 away win against Bologna featuring a hat-trick by Hansen. Although the club dropped to eighth place following a drop of the form by the end of the season, scoring 40 points in total, the club scored 66 goals during the campaign, then the record for a single season. (Note: This record stood until the 2018–19 season, in which the club scored 77 goals.) Three players scored over ten goals: Hansen (18), Sørensen (17), and forward Emilio Caprile (14).

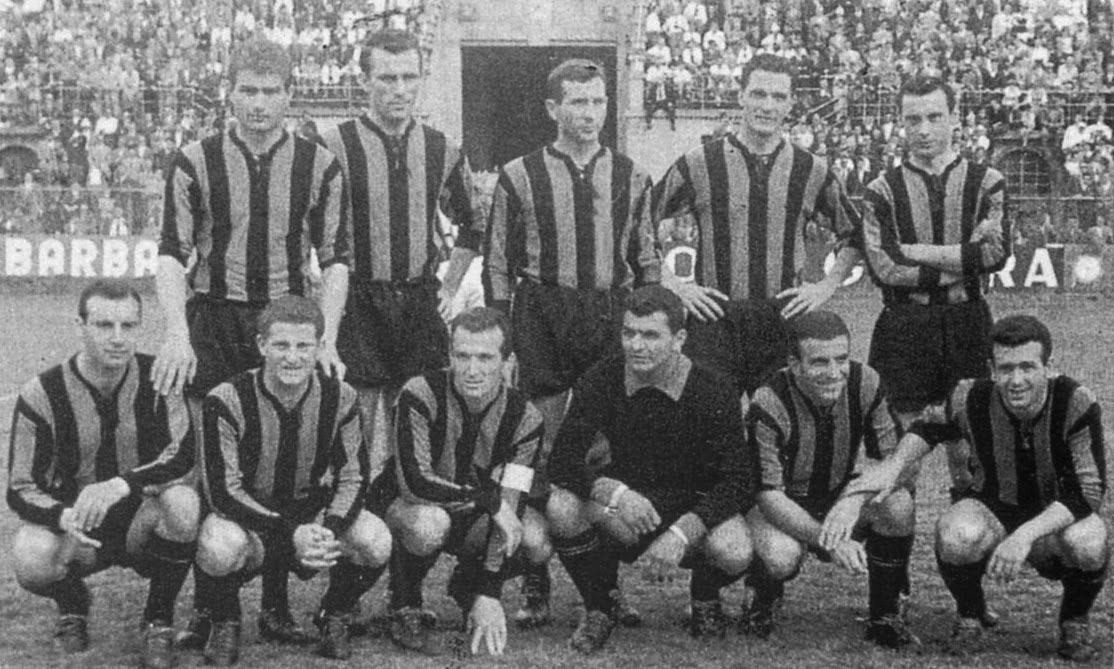
Atalanta team in the 1959–60 season

In the early 1950s, the club continued to perform consistently in Serie A and launched the careers of young players such as Battista Rota, Giulio Corsini, and Gaudenzio Bernasconi. In summer 1954, the club sold Rota to Bologna (though he would return in 1961) and appointed Luigi Bonizzoni as the new coach. The 1954–55 season saw Atalanta struggle in offense. The team escaped relegation thanks to 16 goals from Danish midfielder Poul Rasmussen—who arrived in 1952 to replace Swedish forward Hasse Jeppson after a then-world record 105-million lire sale to Napoli—as well as defensive solidity. With only 38 goals conceded, Atalanta had the second-best defense in Serie A, behind only Milan, who won the league that season.

In 1955, Atalanta featured in the first football match broadcast on RAI, a 2–0 home win over Triestina on 15 October. Two years later (1957–58), the club was at the bottom of the standings for most of the season, only escaping the relegation zone on the final matchday with an away win against Padova. Despite securing Serie A safety on the field, the club was accused of match fixing and was subsequently relegated by the FIGC, while Padova defender Giovanni Azzini, who was allegedly involved in this incident, received a lifetime ban from football. Atalanta unsuccessfully appealed this verdict in July 1958, confirming its relegation for the 1958–59 season, though the club secured a return to Serie A by winning Serie B for the second time in its history under the guidance of Austrian coach Karl Adamek (who arrived midway through the previous season). In November 1959, after the club already won promotion on the field and was again competing in Serie A, it was revealed that the allegations of match fixing were false: the club received an amnesty and Azzini's ban was reduced to two years.

== Coppa Italia and continental competitions (1959–1971) ==
Several important foreign players arrived in the late 1950s and early 1960s, including Argentine forward and midfielder Humberto Maschio, Danish midfielder Flemming Nielsen, and Sweden national team captain Bengt Gustavsson. Atalanta also made its first appearances in European competitions during this time, featuring for the first time in the Coppa dell'Amicizia (Friendship Cup, contested by various Italian and French clubs) in 1959, before also participating in the 1960 and 1961 editions. The club reached the semi-finals of the 1961–62 Mitropa Cup, where it was eliminated (3–2 on aggregate) by Hungarian club Vasas. Additionally, the club participated in the Coppa delle Alpi (Cup of the Alps) in 1963, losing the final against Juventus 3–2 on 26 June.

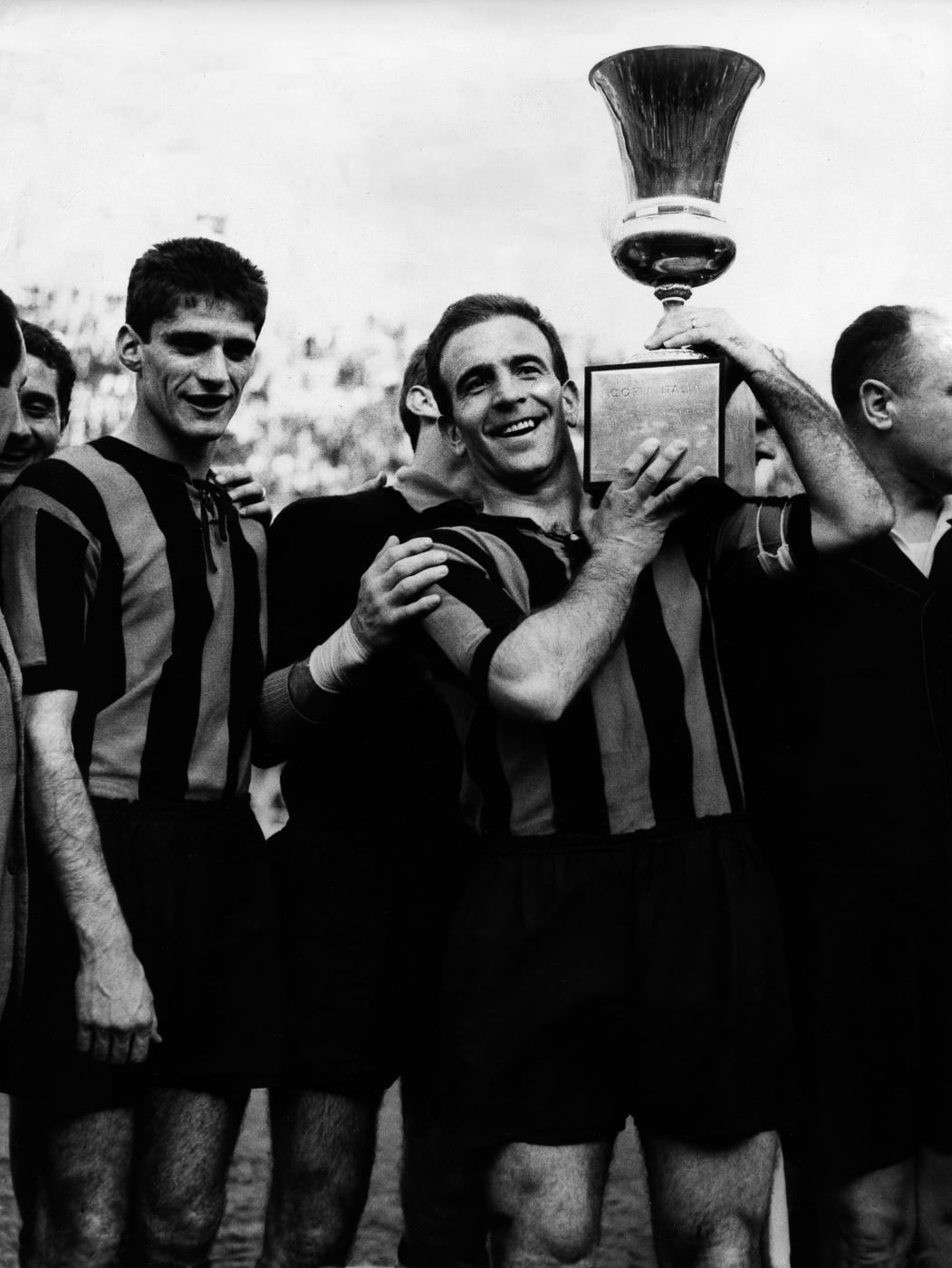
Atalanta players Angelo Domenghini and Piero Gardoni hoisting the 1962–63 Coppa Italia after defeating Torino 3–1 in the final

Following a sixth-place league finish in 1961–62, and concurrently with an eighth-place league finish in 1962–63, Atalanta won its first major trophy, the 1962–63 Coppa Italia. The 1962–63 team was guided by coach Paolo Tabanelli and captain Piero Gardoni, who grew up at the club and played nine years for the senior team as a full-back. En route to the final, Atalanta defeated Como in the first round (4–2, after extra time), then Catania (2–1), Padova (2–0), and Bari (1–0). The final was played against Torino at San Siro on 2 June 1963; Atalanta won 3–1 thanks to a hat-trick by striker Angelo Domenghini. At the end of the 1962–63 season, Tabanelli's contract was unexpectedly not renewed despite the Coppa Italia victory; he was replaced by Carlo Quario. By winning the Coppa Italia, Atalanta qualified for the 1963–64 European Cup Winners' Cup; this was the club's first appearance in a major UEFA competition. However, the club was eliminated in the first round by Portuguese club Sporting CP; after a 3–3 draw on aggregate, Sporting CP won 3–1 in extra time during a playoff in which Atalanta goalkeeper Pierluigi Pizzaballa was injured, leaving the team with one man less.

On 2 February 1964, Atalanta lost 7–1 at home against Fiorentina; this was the club's worst ever home defeat. This result outraged the fans, requiring police intervention to prevent violence between them and the players. Quario's tactical choices were also questioned, causing him to be sacked after the match and replaced by Carlo Ceseroli. The club would eventually finish in the middle of the standings, but the season was marred by Turani's death on 25 April 1964. Attilio Vincentini, who was nominated by ex-coach Luigi Tentorio, replaced him as president that summer. Tentorio left club management (and the world of football altogether) in 1966 when all football clubs were made into joint-stock companies, for he fundamentally disagreed with this idea. Later in the 1960s, Atalanta participated in a few continental (though not UEFA) competitions: the Intertoto Cup (then also known as the Coppa Piano Karl Rappan) in 1966–67 and the Mitropa Cup in 1967–68 and 1968–69. The 1967–68 season saw Atalanta only narrowly escape relegation: Tabanelli, having returned for a second stint as manager in 1967, was replaced as coach by former captain Stefano Angeleri during the season due to poor results. After succumbing to a last-minute 1–0 loss against SPAL on the third-to-last day, a result which tied both clubs at 22 points, Atalanta's survival was ensured thanks to better results than the latter in the final two matches. However, the club would not escape relegation in 1969, ending a run of ten consecutive seasons in the top flight. In February 1969, Giacomo Baracchi took over as president following Vicentini's resignation, though he would be replaced as president after just one year by Achille Bortolotti—who had already been a partial shareholder for several years—following disagreements in management among Bortolotti, Baracchi, and Massimo Masserini.

During the next season, Atalanta went through three different coaches—Corrado Viciani, Renato Gei, and Battista Rota—and experienced a negative club record of 772 minutes (seven consecutive matches) without scoring. These results saw Atalanta sink in the standings, and it only avoided relegation to Serie C (the third tier) on goal difference with a draw against Mantova on the final matchday. Results improved during the next season under new coach Giulio Corsini, who amalgamated many youth players in the squad including defenders Gaetano Scirea and Giovanni Vavassori, as well as midfielders Adelio Moro and Giuseppe Doldi, and lead the team to promotion at the end of the season.

== Decline and reemergence (1971–1986) ==
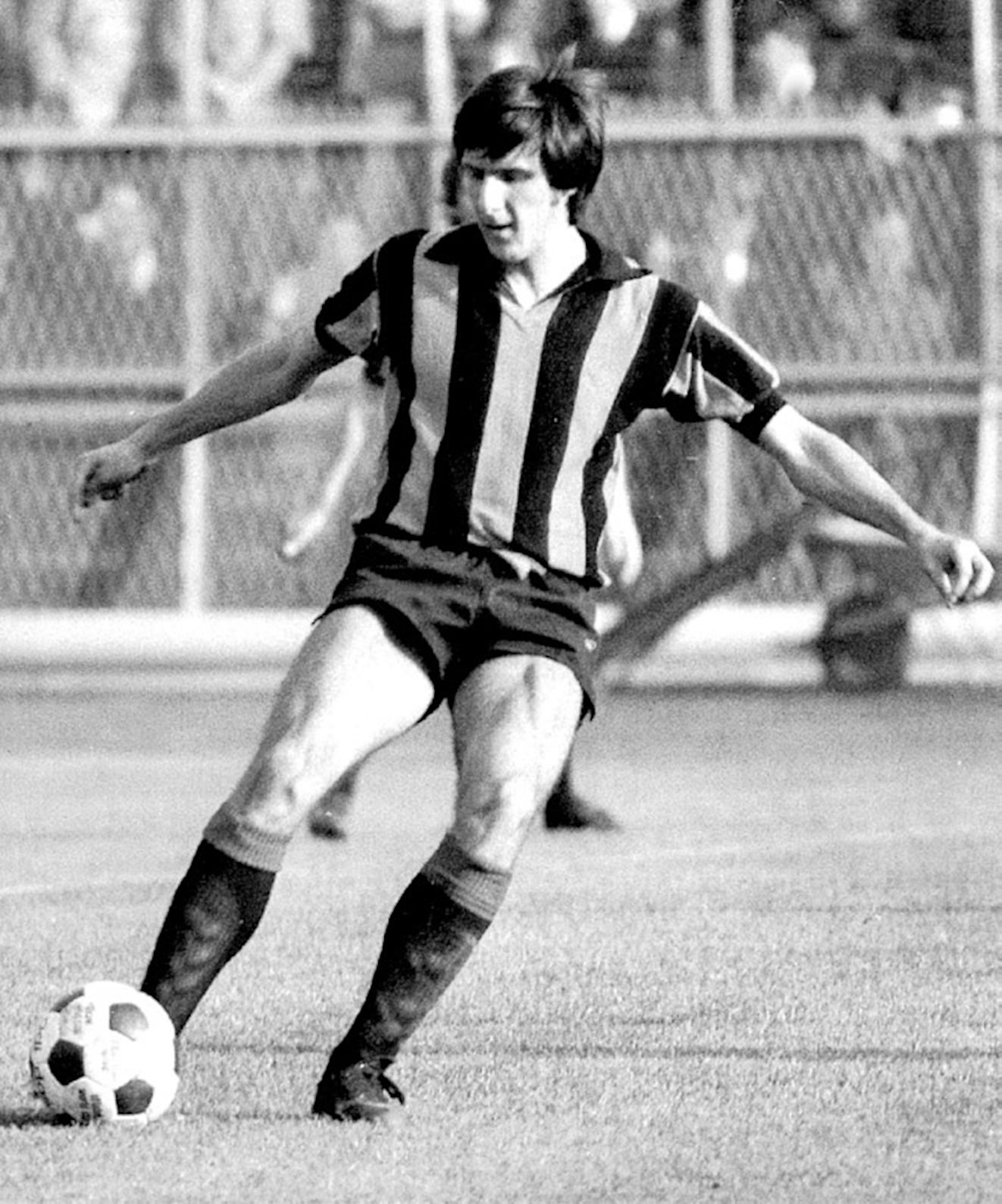
Gaetano Scirea with Atalanta in the 1972–73 season; he would later move to Juventus in 1974 and be recognized as one of the greatest ever Italian defenders

Upon returning to Serie A, Atalanta finished comfortably in tenth place in 1972, but was relegated in 1973 after just two years back in the top flight. At the beginning of the 1972–73 season, Atalanta did not concede a goal in its first six matches and was considered very solid defensively, but then collapsed in a 9–3 loss against Milan, leaving both the players and visiting fans at San Siro shocked. (Note: With a total of 12 goals, it was the highest-scoring match in Serie A history and earned the nickname La Grande Abbuffata (the Great Feast).) Atalanta then struggled throughout the season and was relegated on the final matchday due to inferior goal difference—the heavy loss against Milan proving decisive for the club's relegation. The club also missed the possibility to secure safety in the final three matches of the season, losing each of them.

Following this relegation, the club would spend four years in Serie B. In 1974–75, the club briefly changed ownership and Enzo Sensi became president, though Bortolotti returned as president the following season. In 1975–76, Giancarlo Cadé was appointed as coach to challenge for promotion, and the club acquired young winger Antonio Cabrini in a co-ownership deal with Juventus. Despite these changes, due to sharp differences in home and away form as well as numerous injuries, the club was unable to achieve promotion. Instead, with the club not yet safe from relegation to Serie C, Cadé resigned with three matches remaining and was replaced by former player and new coach Gianfranco Leoncini, who guided the club to three consecutive wins and safety in Serie B. Leoncini was not confirmed as coach, though, and was replaced by Battista Rota, who returned for his second spell as coach after steering the club away from relegation in 1970. Cabrini also moved permanently to Juventus in 1976, and would later win the 1982 FIFA World Cup with Italy.

The next season, under Rota, and thanks to the contributions of players such as midfielder Pietro Fanna, striker Ezio Bertuzzo, and goalkeeper Pizzaballa (who returned mid-season to the club at age 38), Atalanta secured a third-place finish in Serie B. Atalanta subsequently achieved promotion to Serie A via the playoffs against Cagliari and Pescara. In 1978, the club ensured another year in Serie A with a ninth-place finish. However, in the 1978–79 season, Atalanta failed to win a Serie A match until matchday 14; the club would eventually be relegated, again due to inferior goal difference.

After Atalanta was relegated in 1979 and failed to obtain promotion in 1980, Bortolotti passed the presidency to his son Cesare. The club experienced a difficult start to the 1980–81 season, in which several well-known Serie A clubs such as Milan and Lazio also participated in Serie B as punishment for involvement in a match-fixing scandal. The presence of Serie A regulars and a long sequence of poor results saw Atalanta fall towards the bottom of the Serie B table and led to the dismissal of coach Bruno Bolchi in January 1981. Giulio Corsini was then re-appointed as his replacement, but the club's results did not improve and it was relegated to Serie C1 for the first time in its history. This was a major setback for the club and a shock for the fans, for it was the first time the club would play outside the top two tiers.

Many changes from the bench to corporate management ensued that summer, among them the appointment of Ottavio Bianchi as coach for the 1981–82 Serie C1 campaign. Owing to its history and corporate solidity, the media considered the club a heavy favorite for promotion. Under this new management, Atalanta demonstrated its strength and obtained many positive results, winning promotion to Serie B after just one season. The club won group A with 49 points, losing only twice and having the best defense in Serie C1. Atalanta spent the next two seasons in Serie B, finishing eighth in the 1982–83 tournament (after which Bianchi was replaced by Nedo Sonetti) and winning the 1983–84 tournament to return to Serie A, having been absent for the better part of a decade. That season, striker Marco Pacione and playmaker Marino Magrin finished among the top scorers of Serie B, respectively with 15 and 13 goals. Also in 1984, midfielder and Sweden international Glenn Strömberg arrived at the club, where he would remain for eight years and win the Guldbollen—an award given to the best male Swedish footballer each year—in 1985.

== Mondonico era and UEFA competitions (1986–1994) ==
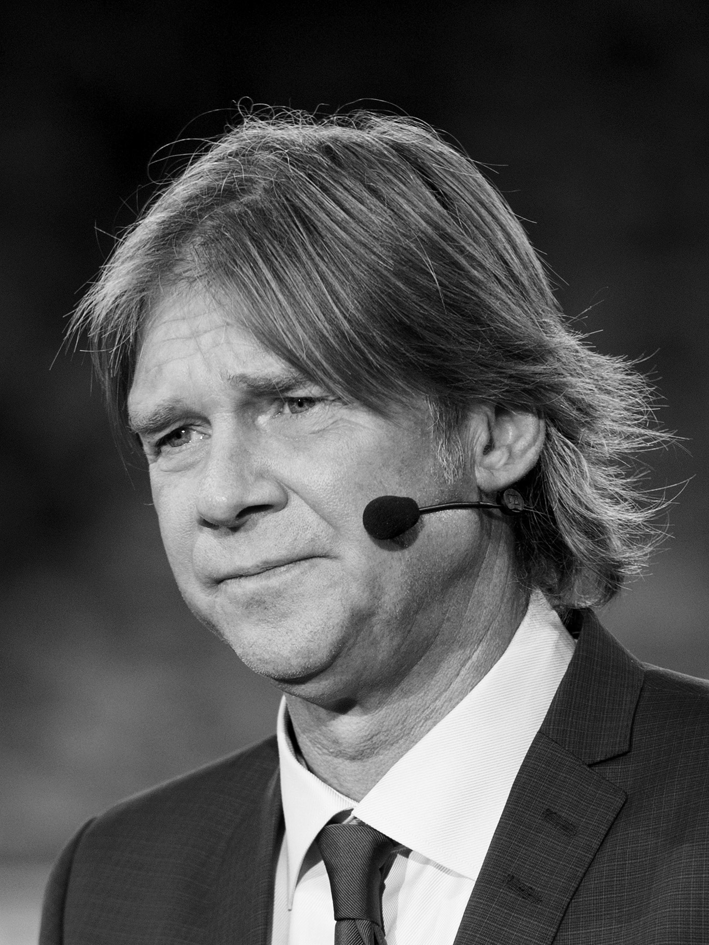
Glenn Strömberg (shown here in 2013), who played for Atalanta from 1984 to 1992 and captained the team from 1988 to 1992

Atalanta remained in Serie A until 1987, when it was relegated on the final matchday following a last-minute loss against Fiorentina. Despite having been relegated, the club reached its second Coppa Italia final, beating Parma and Cremonese en route to the final. However, it lost over two legs (4–0 on aggregate) to Napoli, who also won the league that season. As Napoli qualified for the European Cup with its league triumph, the Cup Winners' Cup spot was passed to Atalanta. This was thus the club's second appearance in the competition and its second in UEFA competitions following its debut in the 1963–64 edition.

The 1987–88 season was a turning point for the club. Under coach Emiliano Mondonico, Atalanta secured promotion to Serie A at the end of the season despite initial pessimism, a double commitment, and a close promotion race near the end of the season; the club finished fourth, just one point clear in the final promotion spot. In the Cup Winners' Cup, the club reached the semi-finals despite playing in Serie B. Though the club lost its first match away 2–1 to Welsh club Merthyr Tydfil, a result that the Italian sports media considered an upset and a setback, Atalanta recovered with a 2–0 home win in the return leg. The club then defeated Greek club OFI (2–1 on aggregate) before knocking out Sporting SC (3–1 on aggregate) in the quarter-finals in a rematch of their 1963 encounter. In the semi-finals, Atalanta was eliminated by Belgian club K.V. Mechelen, who won both legs 2–1 and went on to win the competition. This run to the semi-finals was the best performance in a UEFA competition by a club not playing in its country's top flight league. (Note: Welsh club Cardiff City also reached the semi-finals of the 1967–68 Cup Winners' Cup while playing outside a top flight league. However, it played in the English Football League Second Division because Wales did not have its own league system at the time. Atalanta therefore achieved the best run at a UEFA competition of a club playing in its country's second tier.)

Upon returning to Serie A, Strömberg became team captain, and Atalanta brought in young goalkeeper Fabrizio Ferron—who would perform consistently at the club for eight seasons—and Brazilian forward Evair. In its first season after being promoted, Atalanta finished sixth in Serie A in 1989 and qualified for the UEFA Cup for the first time in its history. On its debut, however, the club was eliminated by Russian club Spartak Moscow in the first round, drawing 0–0 at home before losing 2–0 in Moscow. Atalanta also reached the semi-finals of the Coppa Italia, losing 6–3 on aggregate to eventual winner Sampdoria. In the 1989–90 season, Atalanta further reinforced its attack by bringing in Argentina international forward Claudio Caniggia; the club finished seventh in Serie A and earned a second consecutive UEFA cup qualification. Among other exploits in the league, in the 1988–89 and 1989–90 seasons, Atalanta achieved back-to-back away victories (both 1–0) against Juventus; Atalanta also nearly reached the semi-finals of the 1989–90 Coppa Italia, though was controversially eliminated in the group stage in a 1–1 draw against Milan, following an episode that was widely viewed as unsportsmanlike and that has since fueled the rivalry between the two clubs' supporters.

Despite obtaining a second consecutive qualification for the UEFA cup, the end of the 1989–90 season was marred by Bortolotti's death; he died in a car accident the night of 6–7 June 1990. His father Achille briefly held the presidency until former defender and entrepreneur Antonio Percassi purchased the club.

In summer 1990, Mondonico left Atalanta for Torino and was replaced by Pierluigi Frosio. Under new management in the 1990–91 season, Atalanta reached the quarter-finals of the UEFA cup, overcoming Croatian club Dinamo Zagreb, Turkish club Fenerbahçe, and German club 1. FC Köln in the first three rounds. Despite reaching the quarter-finals, the club replaced Frosio with Bruno Giorgi midway through the season, after a poor run of form left the club in fourth-to-last place in Serie A in January. After this change, the club would be eliminated from the UEFA cup by domestic rival Inter (2–0 on aggregate), who would eventually win the tournament. In Serie A, Atalanta recovered some ground to achieve a mid-table finish in Serie A, though did not qualify for UEFA competitions. Percassi also worked to further develop the club's youth sector. In 1991, he appointed Fermo (Mino) Favini as a scout; he would recruit many promising players to the club, and the club won its first national youth championship in 1993.

Starting in 1992, the Bortolotti Cup was held annually in memory of presidents Achille and Cesare Bortolotti, featuring Atalanta and various invited guests. In the following years, Atalanta earned several more upper mid-table finishes, but did not qualify for any UEFA competitions. The club came closest in 1993 under coach Marcelo Lippi, when it entered the final matchday needing a victory against relegation-threatened Genoa to qualify for the UEFA Cup, though succumbed to a 1–0 defeat on neutral ground; (Note: The match was played on neutral ground as punishment for the behavior of Atalanta fans during the previous derby against Brescia.) a seventh-place finish thus saw the club fall just short of qualification. Following this near-miss, Percassi sought to raise the club's ambitions and appointed emerging coach Francesco Guidolin for the 1993–94 season. Under Percassi, the club also ambitiously purchased Franck Sauzée, Olympique Marseille midfielder and newly crowned European champion. Despite these arrivals, Atalanta had a poor campaign: Guidolin was sacked after ten matches, which saw the club in second-to-last place with only six points and the worst defense in the league, and was replaced by Cesare Prandelli as caretaker manager amid financial difficulties. Although Prandelli enjoyed success with the youth team during these years, he could not steer the club away from relegation, as it would finish in second-to-last place in Serie A. Also in 1994, following modernization of the Tribuna Giulio Cesare, the Stadio Comunale was renamed the Stadio Atleti Azzurri d'Italia ("Blue athletes of Italy").

== Fluctuating performances (1994–2008) ==
In February 1994, Percassi sold the club to entrepreneur Ivan Ruggeri. At the end of the season, Ruggeri reinstated Mondonico as coach, who led Atalanta back to Serie A after having done so previously in 1988. While in Serie B, the club participated in the 1994–95 Anglo-Italian Cup, its last international cup for the next 22 years. Despite a difficult start in Serie B, the club obtained numerous positive results including seven consecutive victories, and secured promotion with a victory over Salernitana on the final matchday.

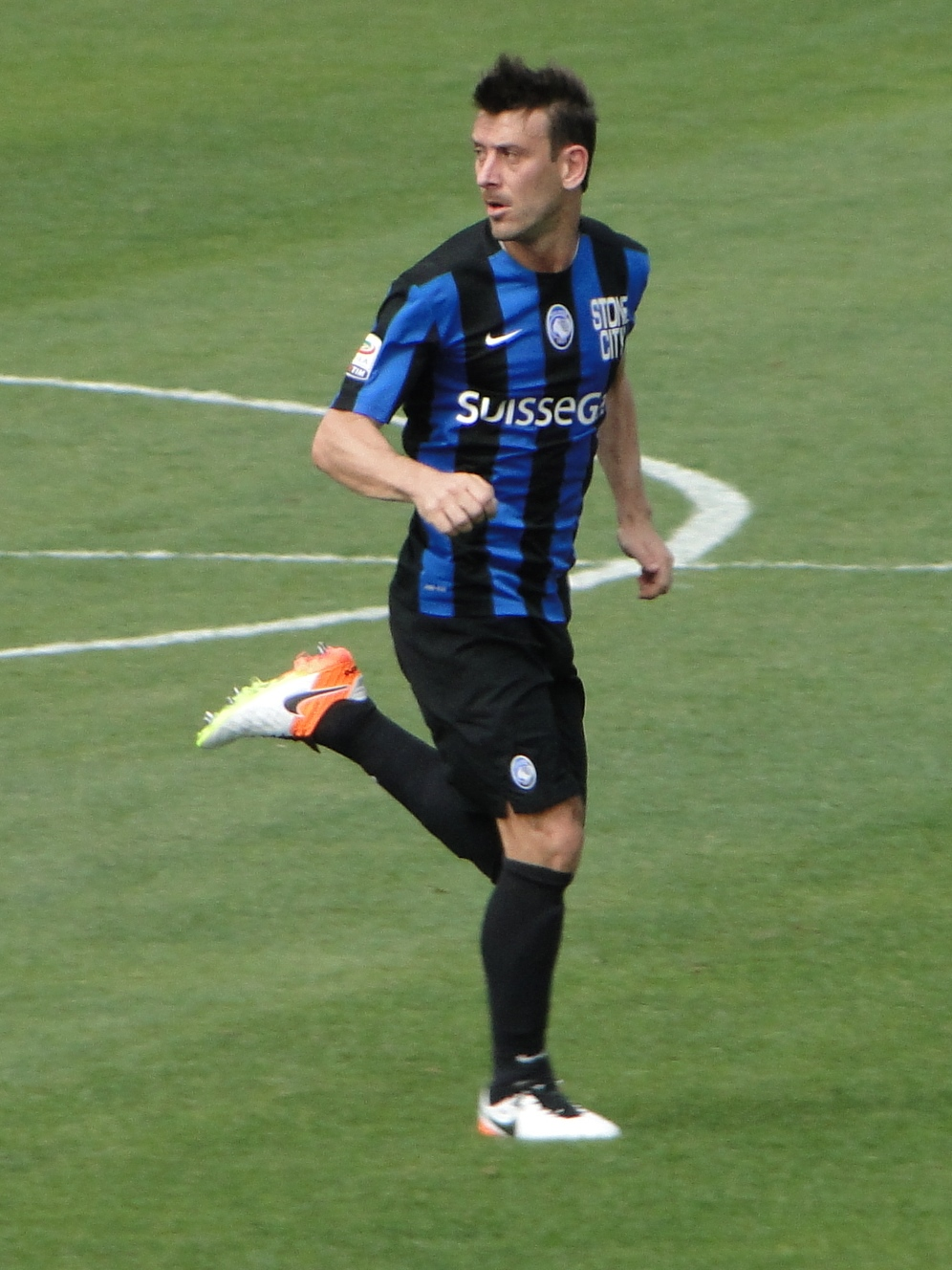
Gianpaolo Bellini, shown here in 2016, who spent his entire career at Atalanta

The next few years saw Atalanta achieve two mid-table finishes in Serie A. In the 1995–96 season, Christian Vieri (who would be sold to Juventus after this season) led the attack; the club reached its third Coppa Italia final that season, though lost against Fiorentina (3–0 over two legs). Future Champions League and 2006 World Cup winner Filippo Inzaghi led the attack during the 1996–97 campaign: Inzaghi scored 24 goals for Atalanta that season, finishing as the Capocannoniere (league top scorer). He remains the only Atalanta player to win Capocannoniere, and despite moving to the likes of Juventus and later Milan after that season, did not enjoy such a prolific season again in Serie A. The 1996–97 season was however marred by another major loss: in February 1997, 22-year-old forward Federico Pisani died in a car accident. The club retired his shirt number (14) and nicknamed the Curva Nord of the Bergamo stadium—the one typically occupied by the Atalanta ultras—the Curva Pisani in his honor.

In the 1997–98 season, Atalanta was again in difficulty despite a promising start (10 points in 6 matches), after having sold its offensive trio della meraviglie ("trio of wonders") formed by Inzaghi, Gianluigi Lentini, and Domenico Morfeo in summer 1997. The club struggled offensively throughout the season, having lost its initial momentum, and fell towards the relegation zone. Following a 3–0 loss in a relegation battle against Piacenza in the fourth-to-last match, the club's hopes of remaining afloat in Serie A diminished. Relegation was confirmed on the final matchday with a draw against Juventus and unfavorable results in other matches, leading to Mondonico's dismissal. Former player Bortolo Mutti was then appointed as the new coach for the 1998–99 season. The club finished sixth in Serie B, missing out on promotion, and leading to the departure of Mutti after only one season.

Another former player, Giovanni Vavassori, was appointed as head coach of the senior team in 1999, after winning several trophies with the Primavera team during the 1990s. The club also chose to invest in its youth system, spending an estimated 3.5 billion lire per year in 2000, far more than any other provincial club in Italy. As the club often lacked the money to purchase world-class players from abroad, it heavily emphasized youth development since the 1970s. Under the guidance of Vavassori and with the help of homegrown players in the senior team, as well as the return of Caniggia (though he would leave at the end of the season), the club achieved promotion to Serie A. Among these players was defender Gianpaolo Bellini, who made his debut under Mutti during the previous season in Serie B; he would spend his entire career at Atalanta (retiring in 2016, after 18 years) and record a total of 435 appearances, the most of any player for the club. Atalanta started the 2000–01 season in Serie A well, and went on to finish seventh, five points short of UEFA cup qualification. This season also saw the top-flight debuts of many youth players who were considered promising, among them twin defenders Cristian and Damiano Zenoni and goalkeeper Ivan Pelizzoli, who would also be called up to the Italy national team. Additionally, during that season, several Atalanta players were accused of match fixing in a 1–1 Coppa Italia draw with Pistoiese in August 2000, for which betting patterns were deemed unusual and investigated; initially, they faced bans of up to a year, but these allegations were later dropped for lack of evidence.

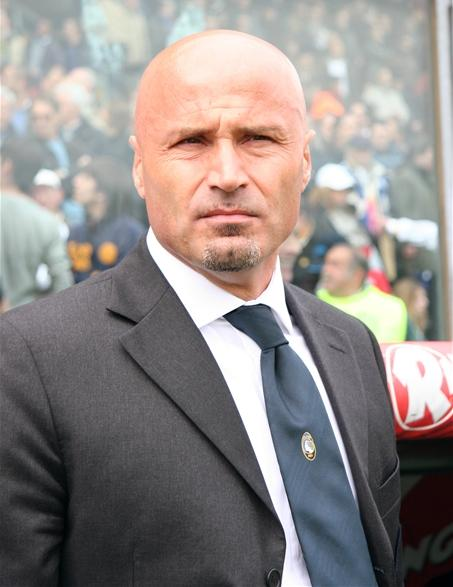
Stefano Colantuono as Atalanta coach in 2007

In summer 2001, Ruggeri sought to improve the team's performances by selling youth players to economically stronger teams (Pelizzoli to reigning champion Roma, Cristian Zenoni and Massimo Donati to Milan) and using that money to bring more famous players to the club. Among them was forward Gianni Comandini, whose 30-billion lire purchase was Atalanta's most expensive at the time. However, the new arrivals did not mix well with the squad or lead to improved results. Atalanta eventually would finish in ninth place that season, though with one more point than the previous season. The 2001–02 season also saw good performances of attacking midfielder Cristiano Doni, who was already part of the first team under Mutti in 1998; he scored 16 goals for Atalanta in 30 appearances, earning a call-up to the Italy national team for the 2002 FIFA World Cup.

Despite two seasons of positive results, Atalanta struggled during the 2002–03 season, experiencing a run of poor results (among them many draws) in the second half of the season. Following a defeat against Perugia, Vavassori was sacked in a desperate attempt to save the club from relegation in the final five matches. He was replaced by Primavera coach Giancarlo Finardi, though the club failed to secure safety after losing the relegation playout against Reggina (2–1 on aggregate). At the end of the season, Finardi returned to the Primavera bench, and was replaced as first-team coach by former Vicenza coach Andrea Mandorlini. In the 46-match 2003–04 Serie B campaign, Atalanta enjoyed a 24-match unbeaten run and remained near the top of the standings; the club eventually finished fifth and was promoted to Serie A. Following a poor run of results in Serie A—7 points from 14 matches—Mandorlini was dismissed and Delio Rossi was appointed in his place. The club eventually was relegated after just one season back in Serie A.

In summer 2005, the club replaced Rossi with young coach Stefano Colantuono. In his first season in charge, he led the team back to Serie A. The club won the 2005–06 Serie B with a total of 81 points and a club record of 24 victories in a league campaign. Atalanta's upward trajectory continued in Serie A in 2006–07, when the club finished in eighth place with 50 points, only four points behind Empoli and UEFA Cup qualification. Despite this success, Colantuono left Atalanta for Palermo; Atalanta replaced him with former Chievo coach Luigi Delneri in summer 2007 as a result.

== Transitional years and new management (2008–2016) ==
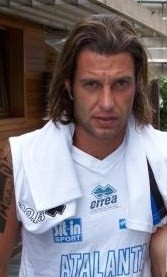
Cristiano Doni, who scored 112 goals (the most of any Atalanta player) in ten years for the club

In January 2008, president Ivan Ruggeri suffered a cerebral hemorrhage. As his health deteriorated, his son Alessandro, who was CEO, assumed the presidency, while his daughter Francesca was named vice president. In the meantime, Atalanta remained near the middle of the standings; despite defeating Milan twice, the club finished ninth and did not qualify for European competitions. In September 2008, Alessandro officially became club president in place of his father. In the 2008–09 season, the club enjoyed many positive results, including several victories over the season's top finishers, though these were not enough to achieve a European qualification.

Alessandro Ruggeri appointed Angelo Gregucci as the club's new coach, following Delneri's move to Sampdoria after the 2008–09 season. This appointment did not last long; the club sacked Gregucci on 21 September 2009 after losing its first four matches. He was replaced by former Arezzo and Bari coach Antonio Conte. Under Conte, the club obtained two wins and three draws in his first five matches, but obtained a series of poor results afterwards: 13 points obtained from 13 league matches. This poor form, combined with elimination from the Coppa Italia by Lega Pro (third tier) club Lumezzane, resulted in Conte having an altercation with the Atalanta supporters and subsequently resigning on 6 January 2010 following a defeat to Napoli. Primavera coach Valter Bonacina took over as interim coach for one match, before Bortolo Mutti returned to the club for his second coaching spell. Under Mutti, Atalanta obtained 22 points in the next 19 matches as it fought for survival, though results did not improve, especially away from home. The club's relegation to Serie B was confirmed on the penultimate matchday. On 14 May 2010, majority shareholders Alessandro and Francesca Ruggeri announced the sale of the company. Antonio Percassi acquired 70% of the club's shares on 4 June, returning as club president after sixteen years.

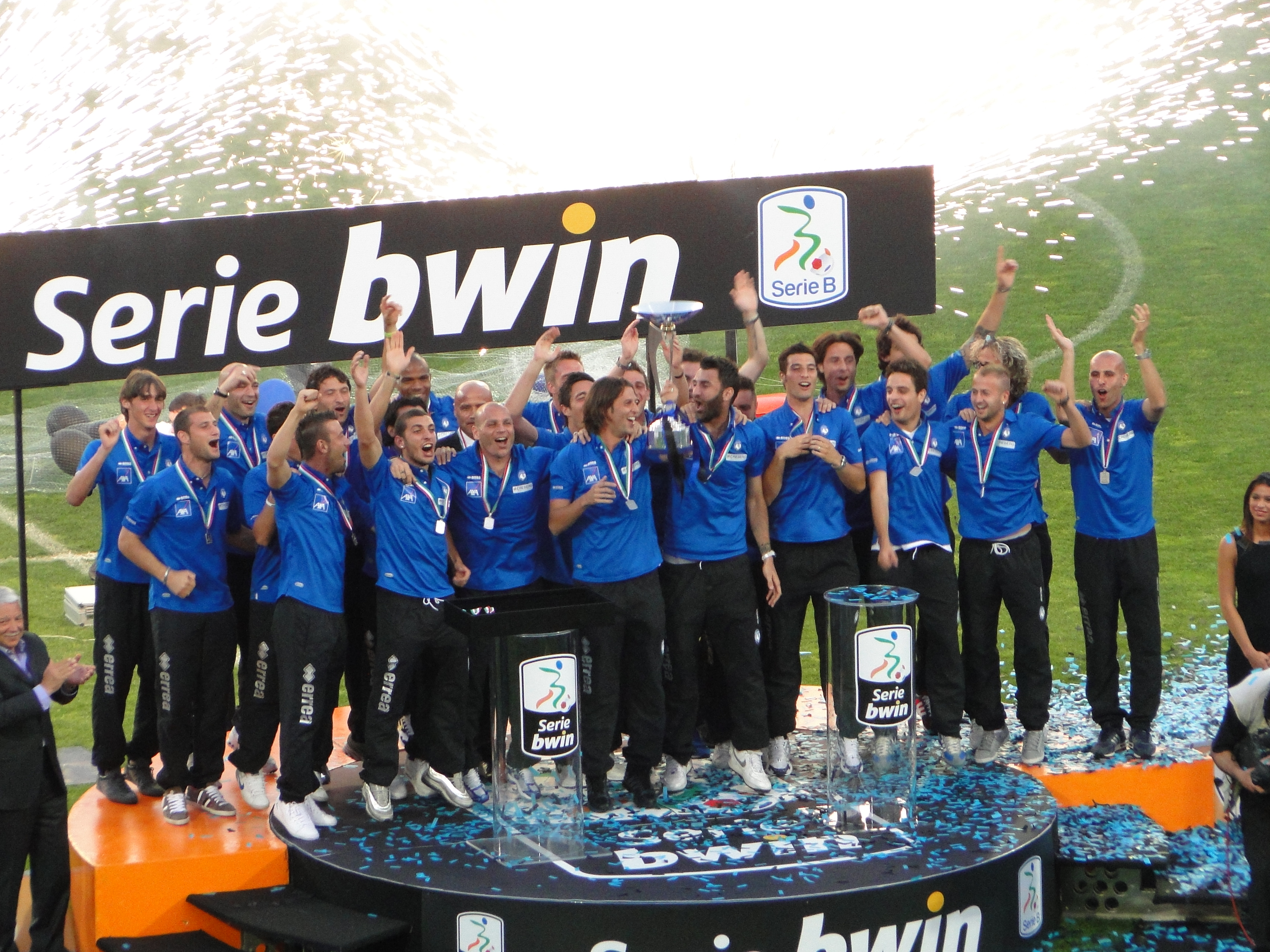
2010–11 Atalanta team, shown here celebrating its triumph in Serie B and promotion to Serie A

At the end of the 2009–10 season, Mutti departed and was replaced as coach by Stefano Colantuono. Colantuono returned to the club after three years, having left Torino after losing the Serie B playoffs; Under this new management, Atalanta achieved promotion to Serie A after only one season in Serie B. Atalanta won Serie B with a total of 79 points and secured promotion with three days to spare; this was the club's second-best Serie B performance after the 2005–06 campaign, during which Colantuono was also in charge.

The following summer, though, captain Cristiano Doni was listed among the suspects for involvement in a match-fixing scandal (also known as Calcioscommesse). Atalanta faced a six-point penalty in the 2011–12 Serie A standings, and Doni was handed a three-and-a-half-year ban from all football-related activities on 19 August, effectively ending his career. Defender Thomas Manfredini was also accused of involvement in the scandal and was initially handed a three-year ban, though he would later be acquitted. Also that summer, Atalanta signed Argentine forward Germán Denis, who would become one of the club's most prolific scorers with 56 goals in four-and-a-half seasons. At the start of the season, Atalanta obtained 10 points in its first four matches, while the company worked to defend itself and its players from these accusations. Atalanta went on to obtain 52 points before the six-point penalty, setting a new club record for most points in Serie A. (Note: At the time, this was the club's point record in the three points for a win era; the club's previous highest league finishes occurred when wins were worth two points.) This followed from consistent performances throughout the season (26 points in each half) and the fourth-best defense in the league with 43 goals conceded, on par with Bologna and Fiorentina. The club secured Serie A safety on the fourth-to-last matchday.

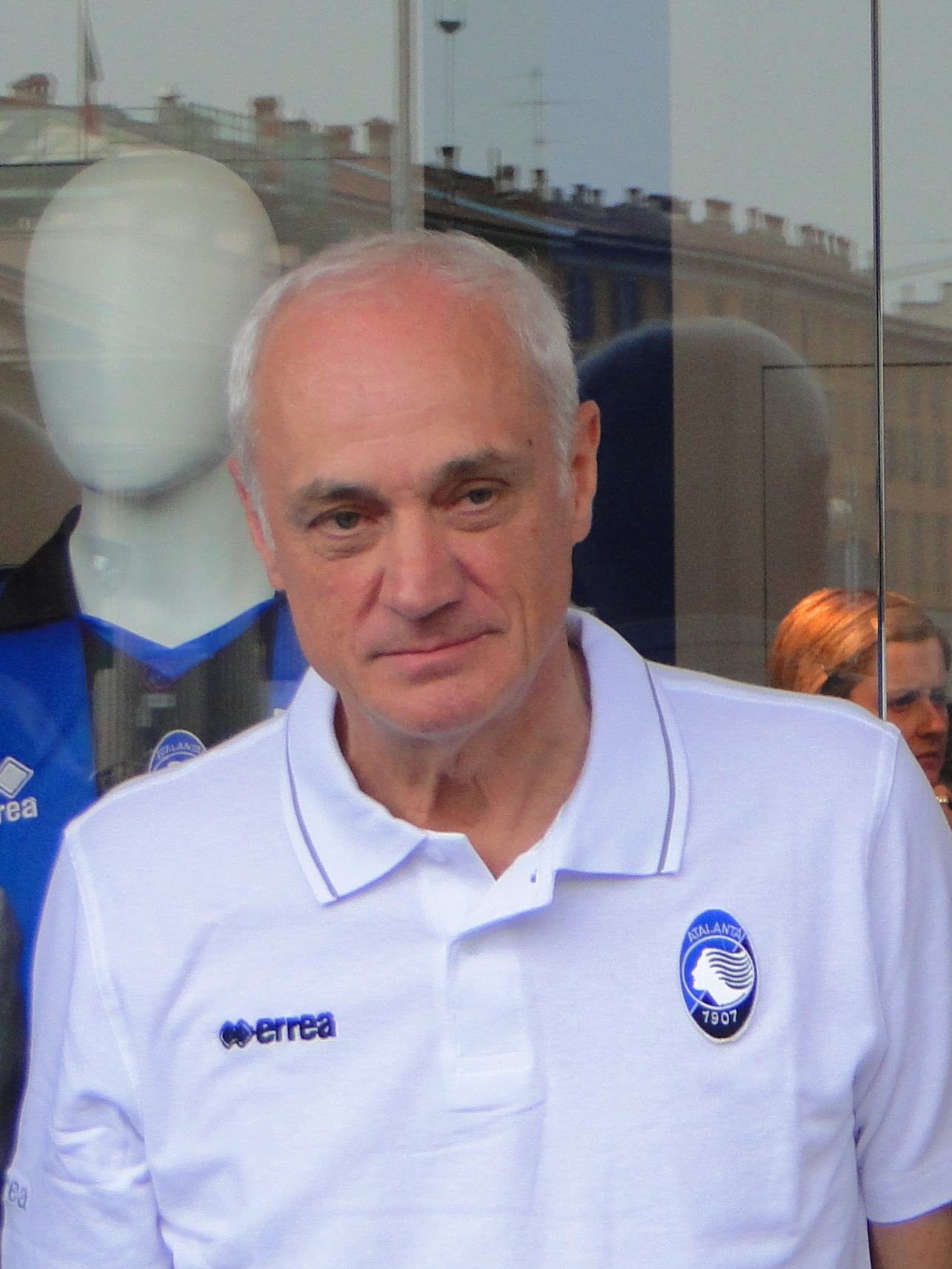
President Antonio Percassi in 2012

On 31 May 2012, following the second round of investigation in Cremona, Atalanta received a two-point penalty in the 2012–13 Serie A and a 25,000 euro fine for the Padova–Atalanta match, while Doni received a new two-year ban. In the 2012–13 season, Atalanta was in sixth place after the first quarter of the season. The club's performances declined later in the season, but the club mathematically secured Serie A safety with two matches to spare.

The 2013–14 season began with the club only obtaining three points in the first five matches, with one win and four defeats. Atalanta then won its next six games, a club record at the time. (Note: This record stood until the 2019–20 season, in which the club enjoyed a run of nine consecutive victories.) The club secured Serie A safety with 46 points and seven matches to spare, improving over Delneri's 2008–09 campaign (in which safety was obtained with five matches to spare). Despite temporarily being tied on points in sixth place with Verona, the club only obtained four points during the remainder of the season, eventually finishing eleventh with 50 points.

Atalanta had a more difficult Serie A campaign in the 2014–15 season, risking relegation with 23 points in 25 matches following a poor run of form. Colantuono was consequently sacked and replaced by Edoardo Reja, under whom Atalanta obtained 14 points in 13 games (with two victories, eight draws, and three defeats) and eventually finished in 17th place (just above the relegation zone). Reja then led the club to a strong start in the 2015–16 season (11 points in the first six matches), but the club then went 14 matches without a win (from 6 December to 20 March, when the club defeated Bologna 2–0 at home). Nevertheless, Atalanta obtained a 13th-place finish and remained in Serie A.

== Gasperini era and new heights (2016–2025) ==
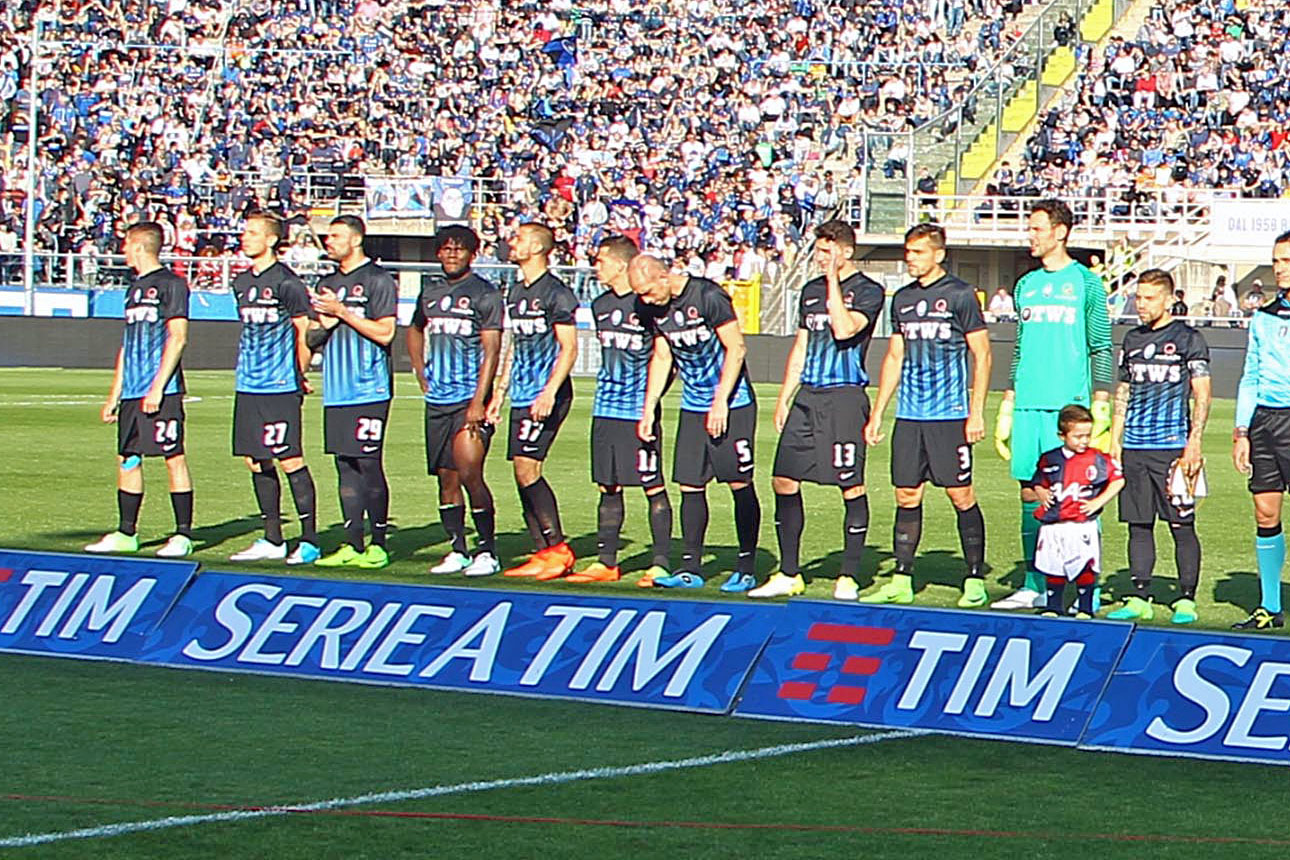
Atalanta team, shown here before its home match against Bologna, that would finish fourth in Serie A in 2017

Reja's contract was not renewed at the end of the 2015–16 season, leading to his departure and replacement with Genoa coach Gian Piero Gasperini. Atalanta began the 2016–17 season with only three points in the first five matches, leaving Gasperini at risk of being sacked. However, with integration of many youth players into the first team, among them midfielders Roberto Gagliardini and Franck Kessié and defenders Mattia Caldara and Andrea Conti, the club's performances steadily improved throughout the season, and the players' eventual sales helped consolidate the club financially. Atalanta was then able to acquire the stadium in Bergamo in 2017 from the comune for €8.6 million, becoming one of only four Serie A clubs to own its home stadium. (Note: The other three are Juventus, Sassuolo, and Udinese. All the remaining Serie A clubs play in municipally-owned stadiums.) This acquisition allowed the club to authorize a renovation project for the stadium; renovation work started in 2019 and was initially expected to be completed in 2021, though completion of the final phase was first delayed until late 2022 and then until August 2024.

On 13 May 2017, Atalanta secured a place among the top six teams in Serie A with a 1–1 home draw against Milan, which guaranteed qualification for UEFA competitions after 26 years of absence. Thanks to a win on the final matchday, combined with other favorable results, Atalanta finished fourth in Serie A, besting its previous record of fifth in 1948. The club also bested its records of total points in Serie A (72) and total victories in Serie A (21). As a result of Atalanta's success this season, many of the team's players were called up to their national teams, several for the first time.

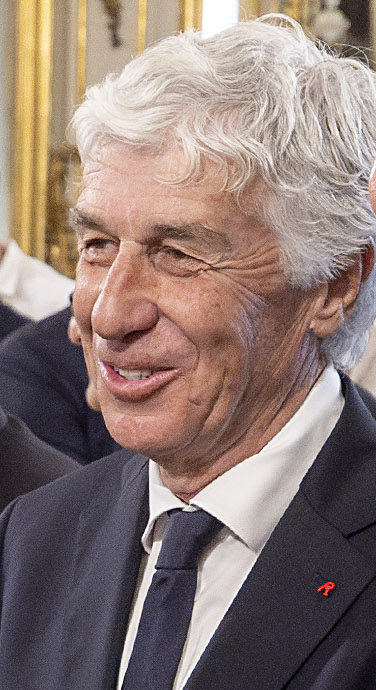
Gian Piero Gasperini, under whom Atalanta achieved its highest ever league finishes and qualified for the Champions League

In the 2017–18 season, Atalanta finished in seventh place with 60 points and thus gained entry to the third qualifying round of the 2018–19 UEFA Europa League. This result was achieved in spite of a double commitment—which some pundits believed would cause the club to struggle—and a tough start to the season in the league (9 points in 7 matches). In the Europa League, the club was drawn into Group E with French club Lyon, English club Everton, and Cypriot club Apollon Limassol; Atalanta finished top of the group unbeaten with 14 points. (Note: The club played its Europa League home matches at the Mapei Stadium in Reggio Emilia because the stadium in Bergamo did not comply with UEFA standards.) The club then advanced to the round of 32, where it was eliminated 4–3 on aggregate by German club Borussia Dortmund. During this season, Atalanta also reached the semi-finals of the Coppa Italia for the first time since 1996, though was narrowly defeated by Juventus, losing both legs 1–0. In the league, Atalanta slowly climbed to seventh place—arriving there with a win over Udinese on 31 March—and held on for the remainder of the season to ensure qualification.

Atalanta began the 2018–19 season by defeating Bosnian club Sarajevo and Israeli club Hapoel Haifa in Europa League qualifiers, though was eliminated by Danish club Copenhagen in a penalty shootout prior to the group stage. At the start of the Serie A campaign, the club experienced a run of negative results (6 points after 8 matches). Atalanta then went on to recover substantially, winning its next four matches (including a 4–1 victory against Inter), and obtaining 41 points during the latter half of the season. The club boasted the best attack in the league with 77 goals scored (breaking its previous record), and with a 3–1 victory against Sassuolo on the final matchday, achieved a record third-place finish with 69 points and qualified for the UEFA Champions League for the first time in its history. The club also reached its fourth Coppa Italia final this season, eliminating Cagliari (2–0), defending champion Juventus (3–0), and Fiorentina (5–4 on aggregate), though controversially lost the final against Lazio 2–0.

The 2019–20 season featured Atalanta's Champions League debut; the club was drawn into Group C with Dinamo Zagreb, Ukrainian champion Shakhtar Donetsk, and English champion Manchester City. Following an agreement with both Milan clubs, Atalanta would play its home matches in the competition at San Siro, as the stadium in Bergamo was undergoing renovations to comply with UEFA standards. Atalanta began its Champions League campaign with three consecutive losses and 11 goals conceded, but managed to qualify for the knockout phase following a 1–1 home draw against Manchester City and victories against Dinamo Zagreb at home (2–0) and Shakhtar away (3–0), along with favorable results in other matches. Atalanta thus became the second ever club to advance after losing its first three matches. In the meantime, the club continued to enjoy success in Serie A, despite the double commitment that caused the club to drop points in the early part of the season; obtaining a 5–0 home win over Milan and a 7–0 away win over Torino, Atalanta's largest ever Serie A victory. A month later, in the Champions League round of 16, Atalanta defeated Spanish club Valencia 8–4 on aggregate; forward Josip Iličić scored all four of his side's goals in the second leg. The season then came to a halt due to the COVID-19 pandemic for three months, in which the Province of Bergamo was the epicenter in Italy. The outbreak in the region has been partially blamed on the attendance of Atalanta–Valencia, dubbed "Game Zero" by the Associated Press. The season resumed in late June and Atalanta eventually achieved a second consecutive third-place finish in the league and Champions League qualification. This campaign saw the club best its records for total points in a Serie A season (78), goals scored (98), (Note: The season total of 98 league goals was the highest of any Serie A side in 70 years.) and consecutive Serie A victories (9). (Note: The club later bested this record with a run of 11 consecutive Serie A victories in the 2024–25 season.) On 12 August, the club faced French champion Paris Saint-Germain in the quarter-finals of the Champions League, though was eliminated following a 2–1 defeat.

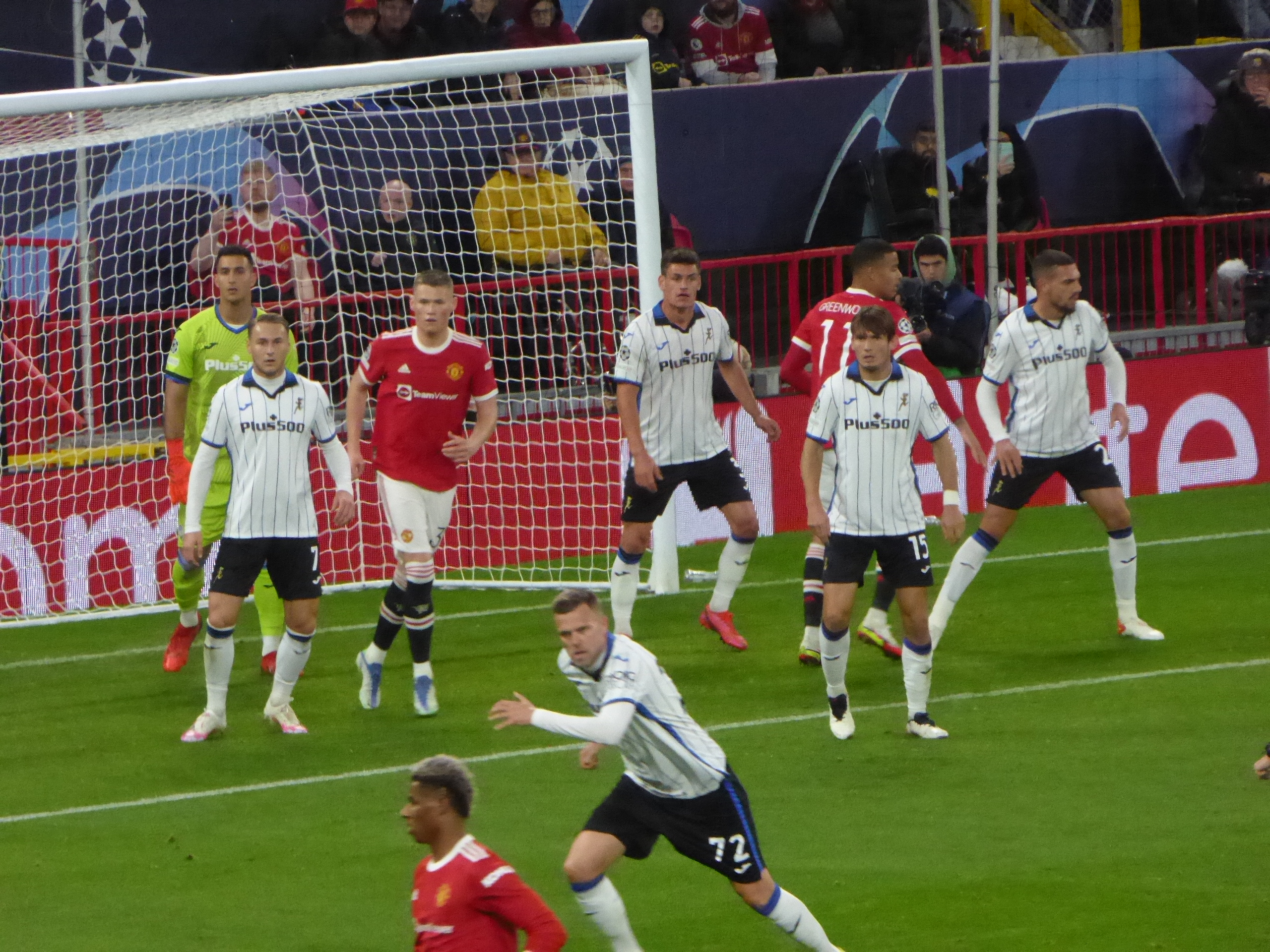
Champions League match between Manchester United and Atalanta in 2021

In the 2020–21 season, Atalanta was drawn into Champions League Group D with English champion Liverpool, Dutch champion Ajax, and Danish champion Midtjylland; the stadium in Bergamo also passed inspection from UEFA, permitting it to host Champions League matches. Atalanta defeated Midtjylland and drew against Ajax, but then succumbed to a 5–0 home defeat against Liverpool. Despite this setback, Atalanta won the reverse fixture at Anfield 2–0. Following a 1–1 home draw against Midtjylland—a match rumored to have catalyzed the mid-season departure of captain Alejandro (Papu) Gómez from the club—Atalanta secured qualification to the knockout phase with a 1–0 away win against Ajax. However, the club was eliminated in the round of 16 by Spanish club Real Madrid, losing 4–1 on aggregate. On 15 May 2021, Atalanta secured qualification to its third consecutive Champions League with a 4–3 victory against Genoa. The club also reached the Coppa Italia final for the second time in three years after defeating Cagliari (3–1), Lazio (3–2), and Napoli (3–1 over two legs), though lost the final against Juventus 2–1 amid controversy. The club finished the season in third place, matching its record of 78 points from the previous season. As a result of Atalanta's performances, a total of 12 players were summoned to their national teams for UEFA Euro 2020 and the 2021 Copa América. Five different Atalanta players contributed a total of seven goals at Euro 2020, the joint-most different goalscorers from one club in any edition of the tournament. (Note: The other clubs sharing this record are Anderlecht in 1984, Barcelona in 2000, Real Madrid in 2012, and Manchester City and Juventus both in 2021.)

The 2021–22 season was a setback for Atalanta compared to the previous few years under Gasperini. In the Champions League, the club was drawn into Group F with English club Manchester United, Spanish club Villarreal, and Swiss champion Young Boys. With one win, two losses, and three draws, Atalanta finished third in the group, failing to reach the knockout phase; instead, the club qualified to the knockout round playoffs of the Europa League. In the Europa League, the club overcame Greek club Olympiacos (5–1 on aggregate) and German club Bayer Leverkusen (4–2 on aggregate), though was eliminated in the quarter-finals by German club RB Leipzig (1–3 on aggregate). This was nonetheless the club's joint-best finish in the Europa League, matching its quarter-final run in 1991. In Serie A, Atalanta finished eighth with 59 points despite achieving its best-ever point total in the first half of the season (38), failing to qualify for any European competition for the first time since Gasperini was appointed. Many factors (e.g., dubious officiating, many injuries, and market choices) were cited for this relative underperformance, especially long negative streaks during the second half of the season. In February 2022, the club also underwent a partial change in ownership: American investor Stephen Pagliuca acquired a 55% stake of La Dea srl—the club's controlling company—in a co-ownership agreement with Percassi, and was named co-chairman.

Starting lineups for the 2024 Europa League final, which Atalanta won 3–0

Gasperini remained at Atalanta in spite of the club's failure to qualify for European competitions, though under new ownership, sporting director Giovanni Sartori was replaced by Lee Congerton and Tony D'Amico. Fans and pundits questioned whether this signified the end of an era or the start of a new one for the club. In July 2022, defender José Luis Palomino was suspended for failing a doping test, though would return four months later following a successful appeal; nevertheless, his suspension led to inclusion of several youth academy players in the first team. The 2022–23 season featured a unique pause—lasting nearly two months between rounds 15 and 16—due to the 2022 FIFA World Cup, at which four Atalanta players participated with their national teams. Atalanta began the 2022–23 season with a ten-game unbeaten streak, though lost four of the next five games. The club experienced positive and negative streaks throughout the season, though would never fall outside the top seven places in Serie A, and went on to secure a fifth-place finish, directly qualifying to the group stage of the 2023–24 UEFA Europa League.

On 4 August 2023, Atalanta established a reserve team in Serie C, becoming the second Italian club to do so. Prior to the start of the 2023–24 season, the club made its most expensive signing ever – forward El Bilal Touré from UD Almería – and also brought in Gianluca Scamacca from West Ham United and Charles De Ketelaere on loan from Milan; the club revitalized its attack following its record sale of Rasmus Højlund to Manchester United. Atalanta was drawn in a Europa League group with Portuguese club Sporting CP, Austrian club Sturm Graz, and Polish club Raków Częstochowa, and would finish top of the group with 14 points and no defeats. In the knockout stage, Atalanta defeated Sporting CP 3–2 on aggregate in a rematch of their group stage encounters, setting up a quarter-final encounter with Liverpool, which the club would win 3–1 on aggregate (including a 3–0 victory at Anfield). Atalanta then defeated French club Olympique Marseille 4–1 on aggregate in the semifinal, thereby reaching its first ever final of a UEFA competition. Concurrently, the club also reached its third Coppa Italia final in six seasons following victories over Sassuolo, Milan, and Fiorentina, though lost the final against Juventus 1–0 following an early goal by Dušan Vlahović. One week later, on 22 May 2024, Atalanta faced Bayer Leverkusen – a side that had gone 51 matches unbeaten – in the Europa League final in Dublin; Atalanta won the match 3–0 thanks to a hat-trick by Ademola Lookman. This was the club's first major trophy since 1963 and Gasperini's first trophy as manager. The club also secured qualification to the following season's Champions League with two league matches remaining.

Having won the Europa League, Atalanta qualified for the 2024 UEFA Super Cup in Warsaw, facing Champions League winner Real Madrid; Atalanta lost the match 2–0. Atalanta subsequently enjoyed a strong start to the season, including an 11-game winning streak in Serie A, which propelled the club to the top of the table at the end of 2024. The team would also finish ninth in the Champions League league phase in its new format, though was eliminated by Club Brugge in the playoff 5–2 on aggregate. In early 2025, the team also lost momentum in Serie A, especially in home matches. However, the team never dropped below third place in the standings, and continued to perform well in away matches, including a 4–0 victory against Juventus in Turin. Atalanta concluded the season in third place, securing its fifth Champions League qualification under Gasperini. At the end of the season, Gasperini announced that he would leave the club a year before the expiry of his contract, after nine years and over 400 competitive matches in charge. Gasperini became head coach of Roma, while Atalanta appointed Ivan Jurić – who had previously been a player and assistant manager under Gasperini – as his successor.
