= List of Atalanta BC managers =

List of managers of the football club

Atalanta Bergamasca Calcio is an Italian professional football club based in Bergamo, Lombardy, Italy. The club was founded in 1907 and it currently competes in Serie A, the top tier of the Italian football league system. Since the establishment of a unified league structure in 1929, Atalanta has spent a total of 65 seasons in Serie A, 28 seasons in Serie B, and one season in Serie C.

Throughout its history, Atalanta has had a total of 61 managers, including player-managers, assistant managers acting as head coach, and caretaker managers. Thirteen managers were in charge on multiple occasions. The club hired its first professional coach, Cesare Lovati, in 1925. Atalanta's only managers to win a major trophy were Paolo Tabanelli, under whom the club won the Coppa Italia in 1963, and Gian Piero Gasperini, under whom the club won the 2023–24 UEFA Europa League.

== Managerial history ==
=== Longest-serving managers ===
Gian Piero Gasperini, who led the club to its highest league finishes and five qualifications for the UEFA Champions League – as well as a Europa League title in 2024 – oversaw 439 competitive matches for Atalanta in his nine-year spell with the club (2016 to 2025). He became the club's longest-serving manager on 9 October 2022, when he oversaw his 300th game with Atalanta, and also had the longest uninterrupted tenure as Atalanta manager (nine consecutive seasons).

The club's second longest-serving manager was Emiliano Mondonico, who oversaw 299 matches in all competitions in two spells (1987–90 and 1994–98), including some of the club's matches in the European Cup Winners' Cup and the UEFA Cup. Stefano Colantuono, who also was manager on two different occasions (2005–07 and 2010–15), was the club's third-longest serving manager, with 281 appearances in total.

Other relatively long-serving managers include Ivo Fiorentini, Battista Rota, Ferruccio Valcareggi, Giovanni Vavassori, Nedo Sonetti, Giulio Corsini, Luigi Bonizzoni, and Imre Payer, all of whom recorded over 100 appearances as manager.

== List of managers ==
No.	Name	Nationality	From	To	Achievements	Refs
1	Cesare Lovati	(Italy)	1 July 1925	30 June 1927		
2	Imre Payer	(Hungary)	1 July 1927	30 June 1929	1927–28 Prima Divisione: Winners (1st second tier title and promotion)	
3	Luigi Cevenini	(Italy)	1 July 1929	30 June 1930		
4	József Viola (Note: Player-manager)	(Hungary)	1 July 1930	5 February 1933		
5	Imre Payer	(Hungary)	5 February 1933	30 June 1933		
6	Angelo Mattea	(Italy)	1 July 1933	30 June 1935		
7	Imre Payer	(Hungary)	1 July 1935	30 June 1936		
8	Ottavio Barbieri	(Italy)	1 July 1936	30 June 1938		
9	Géza Kertész	(Hungary)	1 July 1938	30 June 1939		
10	Ivo Fiorentini	(Italy)	1 July 1939	30 June 1941	1939–40 Serie B: Winners (2nd title)	
11	János Nehadoma	(Hungary)	1 July 1941	25 November 1945		
12	Giuseppe Meazza	(Italy)	25 November 1945	13 January 1946		
13	Luis Monti	(Italy)	13 January 1946	24 November 1946		
14	Ivo Fiorentini	(Italy)	25 November 1946	7 March 1949	1947–48 Serie A: Fifth place, the club's highest league finish until 2017	
15	Alberto Citterio	(Italy)	7 March 1949	13 March 1949		
16	Carlo Carcano	(Italy)	13 March 1949	30 June 1949		
17	Giovanni Varglien	(Italy)	1 July 1949	31 December 1950		
18	Denis Charles Neville	(England)	1 January 1951	15 October 1951		
19	Carlo Ceresoli	(Italy)	16 October 1951	30 June 1952		
20	Luigi Ferrero	(Italy)	1 July 1952	31 January 1954		
21 (Note: Co-managers)	Francesco Simonetti, Luigi Tentorio	(Italy) (Italy)	1 February 1954	30 June 1954		
22	Luigi Bonizzoni	(Italy)	1 July 1954	15 April 1957		
23	Carlo Rigotti	(Italy)	16 April 1957	24 November 1957		
24	Giuseppe Bonomi	(Italy)	25 November 1957	22 December 1957		
25	Karl Adamek	(Austria)	23 December 1957	30 June 1959	1958–59 Serie B: Winners (3rd title)	
26	Ferruccio Valcareggi	(Italy)	1 July 1959	30 June 1962		
27	Paolo Tabanelli	(Italy)	1 July 1962	30 June 1963	1962–63 Coppa Italia: Winners (1st title)	
28	Carlo Alberto Quario	(Italy)	1 July 1963	2 February 1964		
29	Carlo Ceresoli	(Italy)	3 February 1964	30 June 1964		
30	Ferruccio Valcareggi	(Italy)	1 July 1964	30 June 1965		
31	Héctor Puricelli	(Uruguay)	1 July 1965	4 October 1965		
32	Stefano Angeleri	(Italy)	5 October 1965	30 June 1967		
33	Paolo Tabanelli	(Italy)	1 July 1967	15 April 1968		
34	Stefano Angeleri	(Italy)	16 April 1968	2 March 1969		
35	Silvano Moro	(Italy)	3 March 1969	28 April 1969		
36	Carlo Ceresoli	(Italy)	29 April 1969	30 June 1969		
37	Corrado Viciani	(Italy)	1 July 1969	14 December 1969		
38	Renato Gei	(Italy)	14 December 1969	17 April 1970		
39	Battista Rota	(Italy)	17 April 1970	30 June 1970		
40	Giulio Corsini	(Italy)	1 July 1970	11 November 1973		
41	Heriberto Herrera	(Paraguay)	11 November 1973	17 November 1974		
42	Angelo Piccioli	(Italy)	18 November 1974	30 June 1975		
43	Giancarlo Cadé	(Italy)	1 July 1975	30 May 1976		
44	Gianfranco Leoncini	(Italy)	1 June 1976	30 June 1976		
45	Battista Rota	(Italy)	1 July 1976	30 June 1980		
46	Bruno Bolchi	(Italy)	1 July 1980	18 January 1981		
47	Giulio Corsini	(Italy)	19 January 1981	30 June 1981		
48	Ottavio Bianchi	(Italy)	1 July 1981	30 June 1983	1981–82 Serie C1 Group A: Winners (1st title)	
49	Nedo Sonetti	(Italy)	1 July 1983	30 June 1987	1983–84 Serie B: Winners (4th title); 1986–87 Coppa Italia: Runners-up	
50	Emiliano Mondonico	(Italy)	1 July 1987	30 June 1990	1987–88 European Cup Winners' Cup: Semi-finals; 1988–89 Serie A: Sixth place and qualification to the 1989–90 UEFA Cup; 1989–90 Serie A: Seventh place and qualification to the 1990–91 UEFA Cup	
51	Pierluigi Frosio	(Italy)	1 July 1990	29 January 1991	1990–91 UEFA Cup: Quarter-finals (Note: Atalanta changed manager midway through the 1990–91 season. Frosio led the club to the quarter-finals under his tenure, while Giorgi was on the bench for both legs of the quarter-final match.)	
52	Bruno Giorgi	(Italy)	29 January 1991	30 June 1992	1990–91 UEFA Cup: Quarter-finals	
53	Marcello Lippi	(Italy)	1 July 1992	30 June 1993		
54	Francesco Guidolin	(Italy)	1 July 1993	2 November 1993		
55	Andrea Valdinoci, Cesare Prandelli (Note: Caretaker manager)	(Italy) (Italy)	2 November 1993	30 June 1994		
56	Emiliano Mondonico	(Italy)	1 July 1994	30 June 1998	1995–96 Coppa Italia: Runners-up	
57	Bortolo Mutti	(Italy)	1 July 1998	30 June 1999		
58	Giovanni Vavassori	(Italy)	1 July 1999	21 April 2003		
59	Giancarlo Finardi	(Italy)	21 April 2003	4 June 2003		
60	Andrea Mandorlini	(Italy)	10 June 2003	5 December 2004		
61	Delio Rossi	(Italy)	6 December 2004	30 June 2005		
62	Stefano Colantuono	(Italy)	1 July 2005	30 June 2007	2005–06 Serie B: Winners (5th title)	
63	Luigi Delneri	(Italy)	1 July 2007	30 June 2009		
64	Angelo Gregucci	(Italy)	1 July 2009	21 September 2009		
65	Antonio Conte	(Italy)	21 September 2009	7 January 2010		
66	Valter Bonacina	(Italy)	7 January 2010	10 January 2010		
67	Bortolo Mutti	(Italy)	11 January 2010	10 June 2010		
68	Stefano Colantuono	(Italy)	14 June 2010	4 March 2015	2010–11 Serie B: Winners (6th title)	
69	Edoardo Reja	(Italy)	4 March 2015	13 June 2016		
70	Gian Piero Gasperini	(Italy)	14 June 2016	1 June 2025	2016–17 Serie A: Fourth place and UEFA Europa League qualification 2018–19 Coppa Italia: Runners-up; 2019–20 UEFA Champions League: Quarter-finals; 2020–21 Coppa Italia: Runners-up; 2018–19, 2019–20, 2020–21, 2024–25 Serie A: Third place (the club's highest ever league finishes) and UEFA Champions League qualification 2021–22 UEFA Europa League: Quarter-finals; 2023–24 Coppa Italia: Runners-up; 2023–24 UEFA Europa League: Winners (1st title)	
71	Ivan Jurić	(Croatia)	6 June 2025	10 November 2025		
72	Raffaele Palladino	(Italy)	11 November 2025	9 June 2026	2025–26 Serie A: Seventh place and UEFA Conference League qualification	
