= List of Atalanta BC seasons =

Atalanta Bergamasca Calcio is an Italian professional football club based in Bergamo, Lombardy, who play their matches in Stadio Atleti Azzurri d'Italia. The club was formed in 1907, and joined the Italian league in 1929.

The club has won the Prima Divisione (predecessor of Serie A) once and the Coppa Italia once. They won the Serie B six times and the Serie C once. They also won the UEFA Europa League in 2024.

This list details the club's achievements in major competitions, and the top scorers for each season. Records of local or regional competitions are not included due to them being considered of less importance.

== Key ==
- Pld = Matches played
- W = Matches won
- D = Matches drawn
- L = Matches lost
- GF = Goals for
- GA = Goals against
- Pts = Points
- Pos. = Final position
- Serie A = 1st Tier in Italian League
- Serie B = 2nd Tier in Italian League
- Serie C = 3rd Tier in Italian League
- Prima Categoria = 1st Tier (until 1922)
- Promozione = 2nd Tier (until 1922)
- Prima Divisione = 1st Tier (until 1926)
- Prima Divisione = 2nd Tier (1926–1929)
- Seconda Divisione = 2nd Tier (until 1926)
- Seconda Divisione = 3rd Tier (1926–1929)
- Divisione Nazionale = 1st Tier (1926–1929)
- F = Final
- SF = Semi-finals
- QF = Quarter-finals
- R16 = Last 16
- R32 = Last 32
- QR1 = First qualifying round
- QR2 = Second qualifying round
- QR3 = Third qualifying round
- PO = Play-offs
- KPO = Knockout phase play-offs
- 1R = First round
- 2R = Second round
- 3R = Third round
- GS = Group stage
- 2GS = Second group stage
- EC = European Cup (1955–1992)
- UCL = UEFA Champions League (1993–present)
- CWC = UEFA Cup Winners' Cup (1960–1999)
- UC = UEFA Cup (1971–2008)
- UEL = UEFA Europa League (2009–present)
- UECL = UEFA Conference League (2021–present)
- USC = UEFA Super Cup
- INT = Intercontinental Cup (1960–2004)
- WC = FIFA Club World Cup (2005–present)

Champions	Runners-up	Promoted	Relegated	1st Tier	2nd Tier	3rd Tier

== Seasons ==
Results of league and cup competitions by season
Season	Division	Pld	W	D	L	GF	GA	Pts	Pos.	Coppa Italia	Supercoppa Italiana	Cup	Result	Player(s)	Goals
Season	League									Coppa Italia	Supercoppa Italiana	UEFA – FIFA		Top goalscorer(s)	
1914–15	Promozione (2) Finale	10 9	6 3	1 2	3 4	15 8	11 11	13 11	2nd 4th					Delmo Covezzi	17
1915–16	World War I														
1916–17	World War I														
1917–18	World War I														
1919–20	Prima Categoria (1) Lombarda Girone B	10	5	1	4	11	16	11	3rd					Enrico Tirabassi	3
1920–21	Prima Categoria (1) Lombarda Girone E	6	1	1	4	6	15	3	4th					A Ravazio	8
1921–22	Prima Categoria (1) Lombarda Girone B	6	3	0	3	9	14	6	3rd					Giacomo Cornolti	3
1922–23	Seconda Divisione (2) Lega Nord Girone C	14	8	4	2	34	12	20	1st					Felice Martinelli	7
1924–25	Seconda Divisione (2) Lega Nord Girone B	18	3	10	5	14	22	16	7th					Giacomo Cornolti	4
1925–26	Seconda Divisione (2) Lega Nord Girone A	20	10	6	4	38	22	26	4th					Gedeon Lukács	13
1926–27	Prima Divisione (2) Girone B	18	11	4	3	45	27	26	2nd					Luigi Poggia	23
1927–28	Prima Divisione (2) Girone A	18	13	4	1	41	10	30	1st					Romano Buschi	13
1928–29	Divisione Nazionale (1) Girone A	30	6	8	16	27	53	20	14th					Carlo Gianelli	8
1929–30	Serie B (2)	34	11	15	8	37	26	37	8th					Giulio Panzeri	7
1930–31	Serie B (2)	34	15	11	8	62	35	41	6th					Renato Sanero Amerigo Bedetti	11
1931–32	Serie B (2)	34	13	13	8	57	42	39	4th					Renato Sanero	17
1932–33	Serie B (2)	32	9	5	18	52	60	23	16th					Giulio Panzeri	14
1933–34	Serie B (2) Girone B	24	9	8	7	31	24	26	5th					Renato Sanero	6
1934–35	Serie B (2) Girone B	24	12	6	10	38	35	30	7th					Sereno Gianesello	10
1935–36	Serie B (2)	34	13	6	15	25	50	32	10th	2R				Giulio Longhi	7
1936–37	Serie B (2)	30	14	11	5	48	25	39	2nd	3R				Dario Savio	11
1937–38	Serie A (1)	30	4	8	18	22	50	15	15th	QF				Alessandro Fornasaris	7
1938-39	Serie B (2)	34	15	13	6	43	26	43	3rd	1R				Severo Cominelli Nicolò Nicolosi	8
1939–40	Serie B (2)	34	19	9	6	62	31	47	1st	3R				Giovanni Gaddoni	26
1940–41	Serie A (1)	30	11	9	10	45	38	31	6th	R32				Severo Cominelli	11
1941–42	Serie A (1)	30	8	8	14	34	47	24	13th	R16				Edmondo Fabbri Giovanni Gaddoni	8
1942–43	Serie A (1)	30	11	6	13	34	44	28	9th	R16				Adriano Gè	12
1943–44	World War II														
1944–45	World War II														
1945–46	Serie A (1)	26	7	7	12	21	28	21	9th					Walter Del Medico	6
1946–47	Serie A (1)	38	11	15	12	40	52	37	8th					Arnaldo Salvi	10
1947–48	Serie A (1)	40	16	12	12	48	41	44	5th					Mario Astorri	9
1948–49	Serie A (1)	38	11	9	18	40	58	31	15th					Edmondo Fabbri Renato Miglioli	6
1949–50	Serie A (1)	38	17	6	15	66	60	40	8th					Karl Aage Hansen	18
1950–51	Serie A (1)	38	10	12	16	48	69	32	14th					Jørgen Sørensen	20
1951–52	Serie A (1)	38	13	8	17	54	61	34	12th					Hasse Jeppson	22
1952–53	Serie A (1)	34	10	12	12	52	53	32	8th					Poul Rasmussen	18
1953–54	Serie A (1)	34	10	11	13	54	53	31	10th					Adriano Bassetto	17
1954–55	Serie A (1)	34	8	12	14	35	38	28	15th					Poul Rasmussen	16
1955–56	Serie A (1)	34	11	9	14	50	55	31	15th					Adriano Bassetto	18
1956–57	Serie A (1)	34	9	13	12	36	44	31	14th					Adriano Bassetto	15
1957–58	Serie A (1)	34	6	16	12	29	49	28	17th					Raul Conti Marino Perani	6
1958–59	Serie B (2)	38	18	15	5	62	30	51	1st	R16				Giovanni Zavaglio	13
1959–60	Serie A (1)	34	9	13	12	31	39	31	11th	QF				Humberto Maschio	9
1960–61	Serie A (1)	34	9	13	12	35	41	31	9th	2R				Angelo Longoni Enrico Nova	8
1961–62	Serie A (1)	34	13	12	9	39	38	38	6th	2R				Humberto Maschio	11
1962–63	Serie A (1)	34	12	10	12	43	44	34	8th	W				Dino da Costa	12
1963–64	Serie A (1)	34	7	16	11	26	43	30	8th	QF		CWC	1R	Angelo Domenghini	9
1964–65	Serie A (1)	34	7	16	11	19	28	30	11th	3R				Bruno Petroni	10
1965–66	Serie A (1)	34	9	11	14	24	37	29	12th	3R				Enrico Nova	15
1966–67	Serie A (1)	34	9	13	12	28	43	31	11th	1R				Giancarlo Danova	6
1967–68	Serie A (1)	30	10	5	15	26	42	25	12th	2R				Giuseppe Savoldi	13
1968–69	Serie A (1)	30	4	11	15	25	45	19	16th	GS				Sergio Clerici	10
1969–70	Serie B (2)	38	8	17	13	30	29	33	15th	GS				Adriano Novellini	9
1970–71	Serie B (2)	38	15	17	6	41	25	47	2nd	GS				Adelio Moro	10
1971–72	Serie A (1)	30	9	8	13	21	26	26	10th	GS				Sergio Magistrelli	13
1972–73	Serie A (1)	30	5	14	11	16	33	24	14th	2GS				Sergio Pellizzaro	8
1973–74	Serie B (2)	38	11	14	13	24	24	36	11th	2GS				Emanuele Gattelli Sergio Pellizzaro	6
1974–75	Serie B (2)	38	14	11	13	37	36	39	6th	GS				Alberto Rizzati	8
1975–76	Serie B (2)	38	13	12	13	26	24	38	9th	GS				Raffaello Vernacchia	6
1976–77	Serie B (2)	38	19	11	8	44	26	49	2nd	GS				Ezio Bertuzzo	15
1977–78	Serie A (1)	30	6	15	9	28	32	27	9th	GS				Augusto Scala Angelo Paina	15
1978–79	Serie A (1)	30	6	12	12	20	33	24	15th	GS				Salvatore Garritano	5
1979–80	Serie B (2)	38	11	16	11	29	24	38	9th	GS				Augusto Scala Ezio Bertuzzo	5
1980–81	Serie B (2)	38	9	12	17	28	40	30	18th	GS				Carlo De Bernardi	9
1981–82	Serie C1 (3) Girone A	34	17	15	2	42	15	49	1st					Bortolo Mutti	20
1982–83	Serie B (2)	38	10	17	11	30	27	37	8th	GS				Marino Magrin Marco Pacione	6
1983–84	Serie B (2)	38	16	17	5	49	28	49	1st	GS				Marino Magrin Marco Pacione	15
1984–85	Serie A (1)	30	5	18	7	20	32	28	10th	GS				Marino Magrin	7
1985–86	Serie A (1)	30	7	15	8	27	26	29	8th	R16				Aldo Cantarutti	10
1986–87	Serie A (1)	30	7	7	16	16	22	21	15th	RU				Giuseppe Incocciati Marino Magrin	9
1987–88	Serie B (2)	38	14	19	5	50	34	47	4th	GS		CWC	SF	Oliviero Garlini	22
1988–89	Serie A (1)	34	11	14	9	37	32	36	6th	SF				Evair	11
1989–90	Serie A (1)	34	12	11	11	36	43	35	7th	GS		UC	1R	Claudio Caniggia	10
1990–91	Serie A (1)	34	11	13	10	38	37	35	10th	R16		UC	QF	Evair	14
1991–92	Serie A (1)	34	10	14	10	31	33	34	11th	R16				Carlos Alberto Bianchezi Claudio Caniggia	9
1992–93	Serie A (1)	34	14	8	12	42	44	36	8th	2R				Maurizio Ganz	15
1993–94	Serie A (1)	34	5	11	18	35	65	21	17th	R16				Maurizio Ganz	11
1994–95	Serie B (2)	38	17	15	6	49	36	66	4th	2R				Maurizio Ganz	14
1995–96	Serie A (1)	34	11	6	17	38	50	39	13th	RU				Domenico Morfeo	12
1996–97	Serie A (1)	34	11	11	12	44	46	44	10th	1R				Filippo Inzaghi	25
1997–98	Serie A (1)	34	7	11	16	25	48	32	16th	R16				Nicola Caccia	7
1998–99	Serie B (2)	38	14	19	5	44	27	32	6th	QF				Nicola Caccia	19
1999–2000	Serie B (2)	38	17	12	9	51	34	63	2nd	R16				Nicola Caccia	22
2000–01	Serie A (1)	34	10	14	10	38	34	44	7th	QF				Nicola Ventola	11
2001–02	Serie A (1)	34	12	9	13	41	50	45	9th	QF				Cristiano Doni	16
2002–03	Serie A (1)	34	8	14	12	35	47	38	15th	R32				Cristiano Doni	10
2003–04	Serie B (2)	46	19	20	7	59	36	77	5th	GS				Igor Budan Carmine Gautieri	11
2004–05	Serie A (1)	38	8	11	19	34	45	35	20th	QF				Andrea Lazzari	10
2005–06	Serie B (2)	42	24	9	9	61	39	81	1st	R16				Nicola Ventola	15
2006–07	Serie A (1)	38	12	14	12	56	54	50	8th	3R				Cristiano Doni Riccardo Zampagna	13
2007–08	Serie A (1)	38	12	12	14	52	56	48	9th	3R				Cristiano Doni	12
2008–09	Serie A (1)	38	13	8	17	45	48	47	11th	4R				Sergio Floccari	12
2009–10	Serie A (1)	38	9	8	21	37	53	35	18th	4R				Simone Tiribocchi	11
2010–11	Serie B (2)	42	22	13	7	61	35	79	1st	3R				Simone Tiribocchi	14
2011–12	Serie A (1)	38	13	13	12	41	43	52	12th	3R				Germán Denis	16
2012–13	Serie A (1)	38	11	9	18	39	56	40	15th	R16				Germán Denis	15
2013–14	Serie A (1)	38	15	5	18	43	51	50	11th	R16				Germán Denis	13
2014–15	Serie A (1)	38	7	16	15	38	57	37	17th	R16				Germán Denis	8
2015–16	Serie A (1)	38	11	12	15	41	47	45	13th	4R				Alejandro Gómez	7
2016–17	Serie A (1)	38	21	9	8	62	41	72	4th	R16				Alejandro Gómez	16
2017–18	Serie A (1)	38	16	12	10	57	39	60	7th	SF		UEL	R32	Josip Iličić	15
2018–19	Serie A (1)	38	20	9	9	77	46	69	3rd	RU		UEL	PO	Duván Zapata	28
2019–20	Serie A (1)	38	23	9	6	98	48	78	3rd	R16		UCL	QF	Josip Iličić	21
2020–21	Serie A (1)	38	23	9	6	90	47	78	3rd	RU		UCL	R16	Luis Muriel	26
2021–22	Serie A (1)	38	16	11	11	65	48	59	8th	QF		UCL UEL	GS QF	Luis Muriel Mario Pašalić	14
2022–23	Serie A (1)	38	19	7	12	66	48	64	5th	QF				Ademola Lookman	15
2023–24	Serie A (1)	38	21	6	11	72	42	69	4th	RU		UEL	W	Gianluca Scamacca	19
2024–25	Serie A (1)	38	22	8	8	78	37	74	3rd	QF	SF	UCL USC	KPO RU	Mateo Retegui	28
2025–26	Serie A (1)	38	15	14	9	51	36	59	7th	SF		UCL	R16	Gianluca Scamacca	14
