= Quario =

Quario is an Italian surname. Notable people with the surname include:

- Carlo Alberto Quario (1913–1984), Italian footballer and manager
- Maria Rosa Quario (born 1961), Italian alpine skier
