= 1963 Coppa Italia final =

15th Coppa Italia final
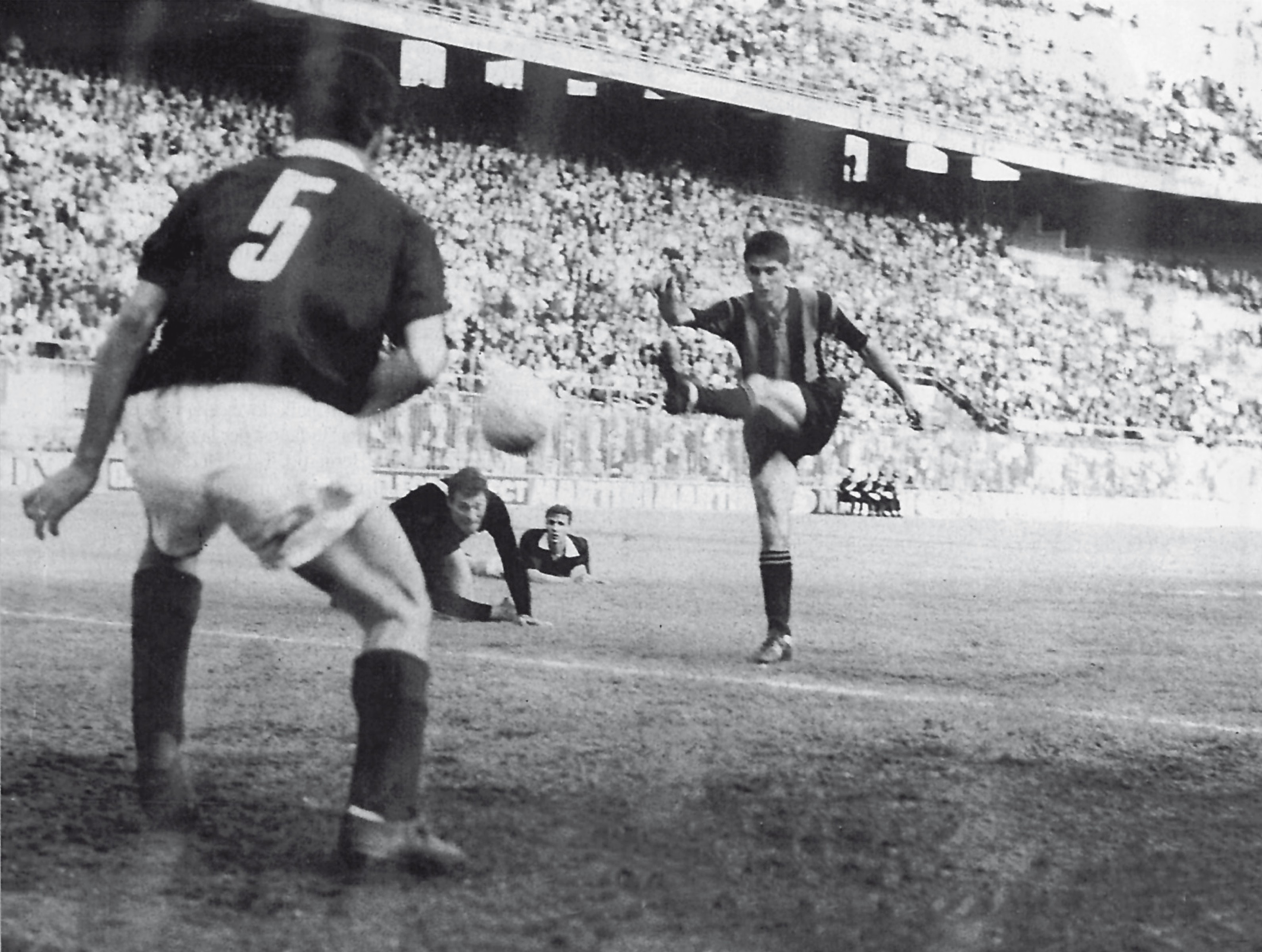
- Atalanta's Domenghini scores his hat-trick
- Event: 1962–63 Coppa Italia
| Atalanta | Torino |
| 3 | 1 |
- Date: 2 June 1963
- Venue: San Siro, Milan
- Referee: Antonio Sbardella
- Attendance: 30,000

The 1963 Coppa Italia final was the final of the 1962–63 Coppa Italia, played on 2 June 1963 between Atalanta and Torino. Atalanta won 3–1 for its first major trophy, which was also their last until 2024. Celebrations somewhat subdued as Bergamo-native Pope John XXIII died the following day.

== Match ==
2 June 1963

| Atalanta | 3–1 | Torino |
|---|---|---|
| Domenghini 4', 48', 81' | | Ferrini 84' |

San Siro, Milan
Attendance: 30,000
Referee: Antonio Sbardella

| Atalanta | Torino |

| GK | 1 | (Italy) Pierluigi Pizzaballa |
| DF | 2 | (Italy) Piero Gardoni |
| DF | 3 | (Italy) Franco Nodari |
| DF | 4 | (Italy) Alfredo Pesenti |
| MF | 5 | (Italy) Umberto Colombo |
| MF | 6 | (Argentina) Salvatore Calvanese |
| MF | 7 | (Denmark) Flemming Nielsen |
| MF | 8 | (Italy) Giorgio Veneri |
| FW | 9 | (Italy) Luciano Magistrelli |
| FW | 10 | (Italy) Angelo Domenghini |
| FW | 11 | (Italy) Mario Mereghetti |
Manager:
(Italy) Paolo Tabanelli

| GK | 1 | (Italy) Lido Vieri |
| DF | 2 | (Italy) Enzo Bearzot |
| DF | 3 | (Italy) Luciano Buzzacchera |
| DF | 4 | (Italy) Remo Lancioni |
| DF | 5 | (Italy) Fabrizio Poletti |
| DF | 6 | (Italy) Roberto Rosato |
| MF | 7 | (Italy) Giorgio Ferrini |
| FW | 8 | (Italy) Carlo Crippa |
| FW | 9 | (Italy) Giancarlo Danova |
| FW | 10 | (England) Gerry Hitchens |
| FW | 11 | (Spain) Joaquín Peiró |
Manager:
(Italy) Giacinto Ellena
