= Piero Gardoni =

Italian footballer (1934–1994)

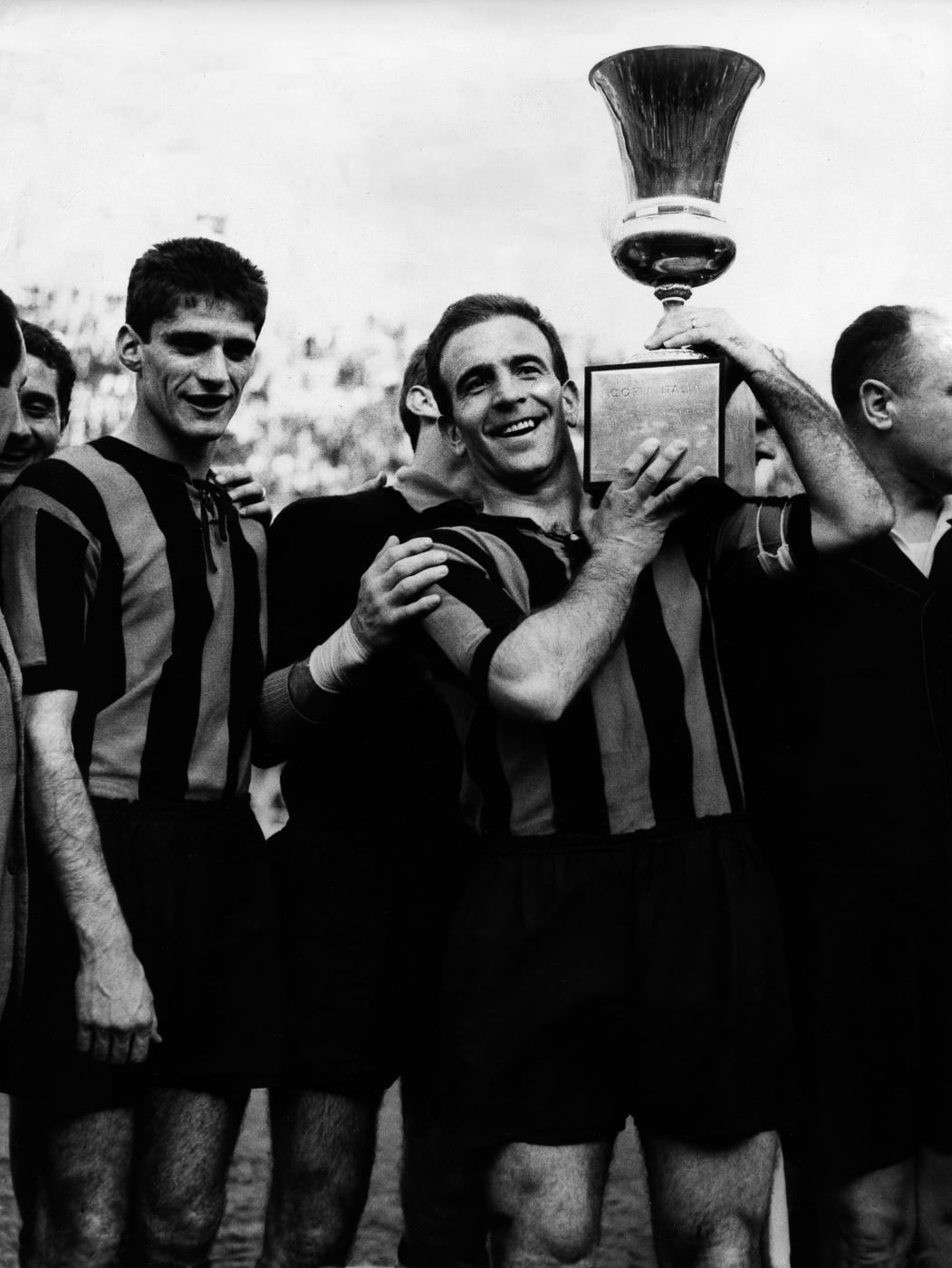
- Gardoni (right) lifting the 1962–63 Coppa Italia

Personal information
- Date of birth: 12 February 1934
- Place of birth: Bergamo, Italy
- Date of death: 15 December 1994 (aged 60)
- Place of death: Sarnico, Italy
- Position: Defender

Senior career*
Years	Team	Apps	(Gls)
1953–1967	Atalanta	209	(1)
1953–1954	→ Caravaggio (loan)	26	(1)
1954–1957	→ Palazzolo (loan)	84	(0)
1957–1958	→ Reggiana (loan)	30	(0)
1967–1968	Reggina	32	(0)
1968–1969	Pergolettese	1	(0)
Total		382	(2)
- * Club domestic league appearances and goals

Piero Gardoni (12 February 1934 – 15 December 1994) was an Italian professional footballer who played as a defender. He played for various Italian clubs, most notably Atalanta, where he spent nine seasons and captained the team to its Coppa Italia victory in 1963.

== Career ==
Gardoni was born in Borgo Palazzo, Bergamo, in 1934, and grew up playing in the youth sector of his hometown club Atalanta. In 1953, Gardoni joined local Serie D club Caravaggio on loan for one season to gain playing experience. He then spent three seasons on loan at Palazzolo, also in Serie D, and one year on loan at Reggiana in Serie C, where he helped the club earn promotion to Serie B in 1958.

Gardoni then returned to Atalanta, where he would spend the next nine seasons. In his first season with the Atalanta senior team, Gardoni won the 1958–59 Serie B and promotion to Serie A. He was then named captain in 1960. In the 1962–63 season, Gardoni captained Atalanta to its first (and so far only) Coppa Italia triumph, forming part of a defensive line that allowed only three shots on target in the final against Torino; Atalanta won the match 3–1. The following season, Gardoni scored his first and only goal for Atalanta, in a 2–1 Serie A victory over Vicenza. In total, he recorded 213 appearances with Atalanta (209 in national league competitions and 4 in cup competitions) and played in various defensive roles: he began his career as a full-back and evolved into a libero.

In 1967, Gardoni left Atalanta for Serie B club Reggina, where he spent one season. He retired as a player after a short spell with Serie D club Pergolettese in 1969.

== Later life, death, and legacy ==
After retiring as a footballer, Gardoni worked in insurance. In the 1990s, he co-owned an insurance agency in Zogno with his son Marco Gardoni. Following a cancer diagnosis, Gardoni disappeared on 12 December 1994 and committed suicide three days later; his body was found in the Oglio river.

Gardoni is remembered for his grit and aerial strength as a defender and for his honest and humble demeanor as a person, as well as for his dedication to Atalanta. As the captain of the team that won the Coppa Italia in 1963, Gardoni is considered an icon by Atalanta ultras and is commemorated in their choreographic displays. Gardoni is also the subject of the fan song Ol Piero, written by Luciano Ravasio.

== Honors ==
Palazzolo

- IV Serie: 1955

Reggiana

- Serie C: 1958

Atalanta

- Serie B: 1959
- Coppa Italia: 1963
