= Battista Rota =

Italian footballer (1932–2018)

Personal information
- Date of birth: 18 July 1932
- Place of birth: Bergamo, Italy
- Date of death: 10 July 2018 (aged 85)
- Place of death: Bergamo, Italy
- Position: Defender

Senior career*
Years	Team	Apps	(Gls)
1950–1954	Atalanta	86	(5)
1954–1960	Bologna	125	(0)
1960–1961	SPAL	23	(0)
1961–1964	Atalanta	50	(0)

International career
1952	Italy	2	(0)

Managerial career
- 1966: Seregno
- 1970: Atalanta
- 1970–1976: Cremonese
- 1976–1980: Atalanta
- 1980–1982: SPAL
- 1982–1983: Modena
- 1983–1988: Piacenza
- 1988–1989: Vicenza Virtus
- 1989–1991: Palazzolo
- 1991–1992: Lecco
- 1992–1993: Pergocrema
- 1993–1994: Lecco
- 1995: Lecco
- * Club domestic league appearances and goals

Battista Rota (Italian pronunciation: [batˈtista ˈrɔːta]; (18 July 1932 – 10 July 2018) was an Italian footballer who played as a defender. He competed in the men's tournament at the 1952 Summer Olympics.

== Honours ==
=== Club ===
Atalanta

- Coppa Italia: 1962–63
