= Renato Sanero =

Italian footballer

Personal information
- Date of birth: October 24, 1907
- Place of birth: Turin, Italy
- Position: Striker

Senior career*
Years	Team	Apps	(Gls)
1926–1927	Juventus	0	(0)
1927–1928	Lazio	13	(4)
1928–1930	Juventus	19	(11)
1930–1935	Atalanta	129	(44)
1935–1939	Padova	56	(28)
- * Club domestic league appearances and goals

Renato Sanero (born October 24, 1907, in Turin) was an Italian professional football player.
