= Ezio Bertuzzo =

Italian footballer and coach

Personal information
- Date of birth: 23 July 1952
- Place of birth: Settimo Torinese, Italy
- Date of death: 23 February 2014 (aged 61)
- Place of death: Turin, Italy
- Position: Striker

Youth career
- 196?–1969: Torino

Senior career*
Years	Team	Apps	(Gls)
1969–1970	Torino	0	(0)
1970–1971	Canelli	31	(6)
1971–1972	Asti	29	(10)
1972–1975	Brescia	80	(25)
1975–1976	Bologna	15	(1)
1976–1977	Atalanta	40	(13)
1978–1979	Cesena	6	(0)
1979–1982	Atalanta	91	(14)
1982–1983	Asti	29	(4)
1983–1984	Crotone	40	(6)
1984–1985	Pinerolo	?	(8)
1985–1987	Saviglianese	?	(?)

Managerial career
- 199?: Torino (Youth)
- 2004–2013: Bassano Virtus (Youth)
- 2013–2014: Gassino San Raffaele (Youth)
- * Club domestic league appearances and goals

Ezio Bertuzzo (23 July 1952 – 23 February 2014) was an Italian football coach and player, whose career as a striker spanned from the mid-1960s until 1987. In the 1981–82 season, his Atalanta team won the Serie C1 Group A championship. He began his coaching career in the 1990s until his death in 2014, coaching youth teams in his later years.

Bertuzzo died in February 2014 of an undisclosed incurable disease in Turin. He was 61.
