= Imre Payer =

Hungarian footballer

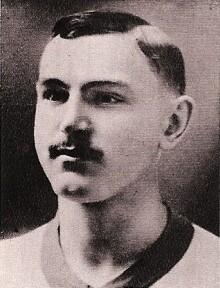

Personal information
- Date of birth: 1 June 1888
- Place of birth: Sopronkövesd, Austria-Hungary
- Date of death: 15 August 1957 (aged 69)

International career
| Years | Team | Apps | (Gls) |
- Hungary

Imre Payer (1 June 1888 – 15 August 1957) was a Hungarian footballer. He competed in the men's tournament at the 1912 Summer Olympics.
