= Severo Cominelli =

Italian footballer

Personal information
- Date of birth: 11 November 1915
- Place of birth: Ponte Nossa, Italy
- Date of death: 20 April 1998 (aged 82)
- Height: 1.70 m (5 ft 7 in)
- Position: Midfielder

Senior career*
Years	Team	Apps	(Gls)
1933–1934	Gallaratese		
1934–1941	Atalanta	194	(55)
1941–1943	Internazionale	46	(5)
1943–1944	Atalanta	13	(5)
1945–1947	Internazionale	70	(1)
1947–1949	Atalanta	57	(5)
1949–1950	SPAL	28	(0)
- * Club domestic league appearances and goals

Severo Cominelli (11 November 1915 – 20 April 1998) was an Italian professional football player. Considered one of the best footballers in Atalanta's history.
