= Karl Adamek =

Austrian footballer (1910–2000)

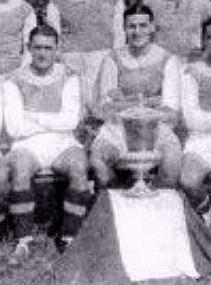
- Karl Adamek (left) in 1933 at FK Austria Vienna.

Personal information
- Date of birth: 23 July 1910
- Place of birth: Vienna, Austria-Hungary
- Date of death: 8 January 2000 (aged 89)
- Position: Defender

Senior career*
Years	Team	Apps	(Gls)
1927–1929	Brigittenauer AC		
1929–1931	Wiener AC		
1931	Floridsdorfer AC		
1931–1932	Brigittenauer AC		
1932–1933	Austria Wien		
1933–1935	Le Havre AC		
1935–1937	Austria Wien		

International career
1932–1937	Austria	8	(0)

Managerial career
- 1948–1949: FC Biel
- 1950–1957: IFK Norrköping
- 1957–1958: Austria Wien
- 1958–1959: Atalanta
- 1960: Örgryte IS
- 1965–1966: Sturm Graz
- SV Stockerau
- 1970: Bodø/Glimt
- 1971: HamKam
- * Club domestic league appearances and goals

Karl Adamek (23 July 1910 in Vienna – 8 January 2000) was an Austrian football player and manager. A defender, he made eight appearances for the Austria national team.
