= Antonio Sbardella =

Italian footballer, referee, and sports official (1925-2002)

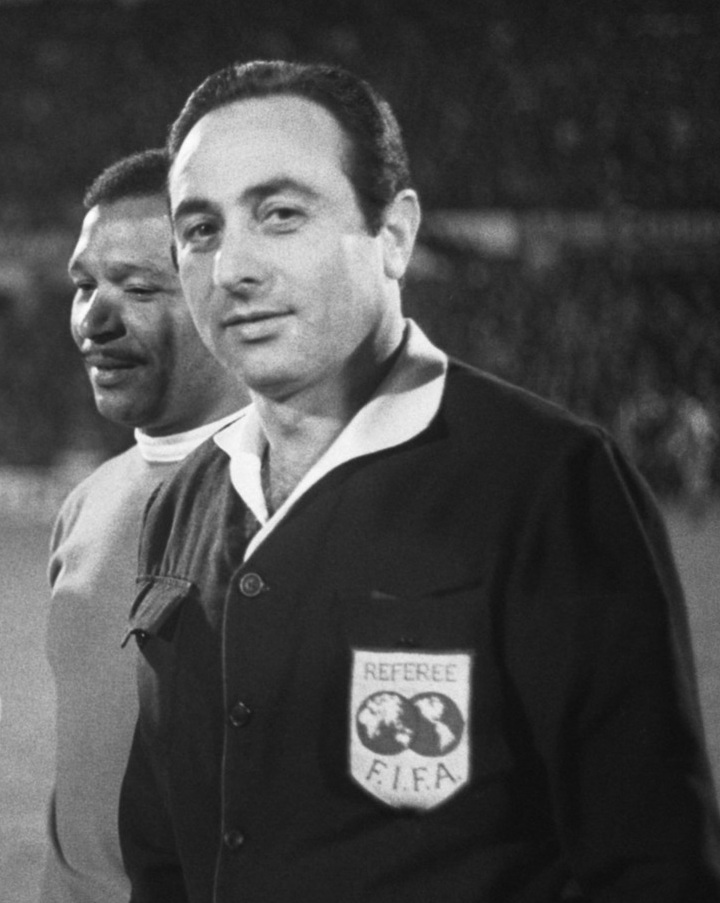
- Sbardella in 1969
- Born: 17 October 1925; Palestrina, Kingdom of Italy
- Died: 14 January 2002 (aged 76); Rome, Italy

Domestic
Years	League	Role
–1971	Serie A	Referee

International
Years	League	Role
1964–1971	FIFA listed	Referee

Antonio Sbardella (17 October 1925 – 14 January 2002) was an Italian football player, referee and sports official. He is best known for refereeing at the 1970 FIFA World Cup.

== Career ==
Born in Palestrina near Rome, Sbardella first got involved in football playing as a goalkeeper at youth levels of the local powerhouse Lazio. However Sbardella never appeared in the Serie A as he failed to rise through the ranks at Lazio, and he eventually finished his playing career at Artiglio, a small Rome-based Serie C club.

He then took up refereeing, and in his domestic career he officiated a total of 167 Serie A matches. Along with Concetto Lo Bello he was considered one of the top two Italian referees of the 1960s and 1970s.

The pinnacle of his career came at the 1970 FIFA World Cup in Mexico, in which he refereed two matches, including the match for third place between West Germany and Uruguay. Sbardella had been designated to referee the final, but was eventually replaced by East Germany's Rudi Glöckner because Italy national football team had reached the final.

In club football his highlights include officiating two Coppa Italia finals (the 1963 final between Atalanta and Torino and the 1966 final between Catanzaro and Fiorentina), and the second leg of the 1967 Inter-Cities Fairs Cup final between Leeds United and Dinamo Zagreb.

After retiring from refereeing, Sbardella became a Sport Manager of Lazio, Roma and Triestina football clubs in the 1970s and 1980s. The greatest satisfactions came from the period spent at Lazio, when together with Tommaso Maestrelli, he managed to build a team with many unruly talents, who kept at bay but gave to the club of president Lenzini the Italian championship of 1974.
