= Stefano Angeleri =

Italian footballer and coach (1926–2012)

Personal information
- Date of birth: 26 August 1926
- Place of birth: Castellazzo Bormida, Italy
- Date of death: 31 January 2012 (aged 85)
- Height: 1.73 m (5 ft 8 in)
- Position: Midfielder

Senior career*
Years	Team	Apps	(Gls)
1939–1940	Oratorio Ovada		
1940–1943	Acqui		
1945–1947	Voghera	31	(0)
1947–1949	Juventus	47	(2)
1949–1960	Atalanta	317	(2)

Managerial career
- 1961–1965: Atalanta (youth)
- 1965–1969: Atalanta
- 1969–1972: Parma
- 1973: Modena
- 1973–1976: Seregno
- 1976–1978: Cremonese
- 1978–1980: Casale
- 1980–1981: Pergocrema
- 1982: Sant'Angelo
- 1982–1983: Piacenza
- 1983–1985: Seregno
- 1985–1986: Lecco
- * Club domestic league appearances and goals

Stefano Angeleri (26 August 1926 – 31 January 2012) was an Italian footballer and coach.
