= Giulio Corsini =

Italian footballer (1933–2009)

Personal information
- Date of birth: 28 September 1933
- Place of birth: Bergamo, Italy
- Date of death: 31 December 2009 (aged 76)
- Place of death: Bergamo, Italy
- Height: 1.72 m (5 ft 8 in)
- Position: Defender

Senior career*
Years	Team	Apps	(Gls)
1952–1957	Atalanta	129	(2)
1957–1964	Roma	145	(1)
1964–1968	Mantova	76	(0)
Total		350	(3)

Managerial career
- 1968–1970: Mantova (assistant)
- 1970–1974: Atalanta
- 1974–1975: Sampdoria
- 1975: Lazio
- 1976–1977: Cesena
- 1977–1978: Atalanta (youth)
- 1978–1979: Bari
- 1980–1981: Atalanta
- * Club domestic league appearances and goals

Giulio Corsini (28 September 1933 – 31 December 2009) was an Italian professional football player and coach.

== Career ==
A defender, Corsini played for 15 seasons (327 games, three goals) in the Serie A for Atalanta, Roma and Mantova.

After finishing his career as a player, he led Atalanta to promotion to Serie A in his first season as head coach. After they were relegated, he was fired before he could bring them back. When he took reign of Sampdoria next, Sampdoria was supposed to play on the second level Serie B. However, due to a scandal and penalties on other teams, Sampdoria kept their Serie A spot. With the roster already assembled for Serie B, Sampdoria had to fight hard to avoid relegation. After the season, he was hired by Lazio, but was fired after eight games in the next season in which Lazio gained five points and were second from the bottom. Next, he was hired by Cesena, who qualified for the UEFA Cup for the first time in their history. Cesena was knocked out of the cup in the first round and he was fired again. He did not work in the Serie A after that.

== Honours ==
Roma

- Inter-Cities Fairs Cup: 1960–61
- Coppa Italia: 1963–64
