= Carlo Alberto Quario =

Italian footballer and coach (1913–1984)

Personal information
- Date of birth: 14 March 1913
- Place of birth: Vercelli, Italy
- Date of death: 30 August 1984 (aged 71)
- Position: Striker

Senior career*
Years	Team	Apps	(Gls)
1932–1933	Ambrosiana-Inter (B team)		
1933–1934	Pavia	3	(0)
1934–1935	Ambrosiana-Inter	0	(0)
1935–1936	Anconitana		
1937–1938	Falck Sesto San Giovanni		
1938–1939	Pro Vercelli	34	(21)
1939–1941	Napoli	51	(16)
1941–1942	Ambrosiana-Inter	16	(6)
1942–1943	Biellese	15	(12)
1945–1947	Brescia	16	(4)
1947–1950	Pavia		

Managerial career
- 1950–1951: Bolzano
- 1951–1953: Toma Maglie
- 1953–1954: Parma
- 1954–1955: Cagliari
- 1955–1959: Venezia
- 1959–1960: Brescia
- 1960–1963: Venezia
- 1963–1964: Atalanta
- 1964–1968: Marzotto Valdagno
- 1968–1969: Venezia
- * Club domestic league appearances and goals

Carlo Alberto Quario (born 14 March 1913 in Vercelli; died 30 August 1984) was an Italian professional football player and coach.
