= 1962–63 Coppa Italia =

Italian Football Federation domestic cup competition

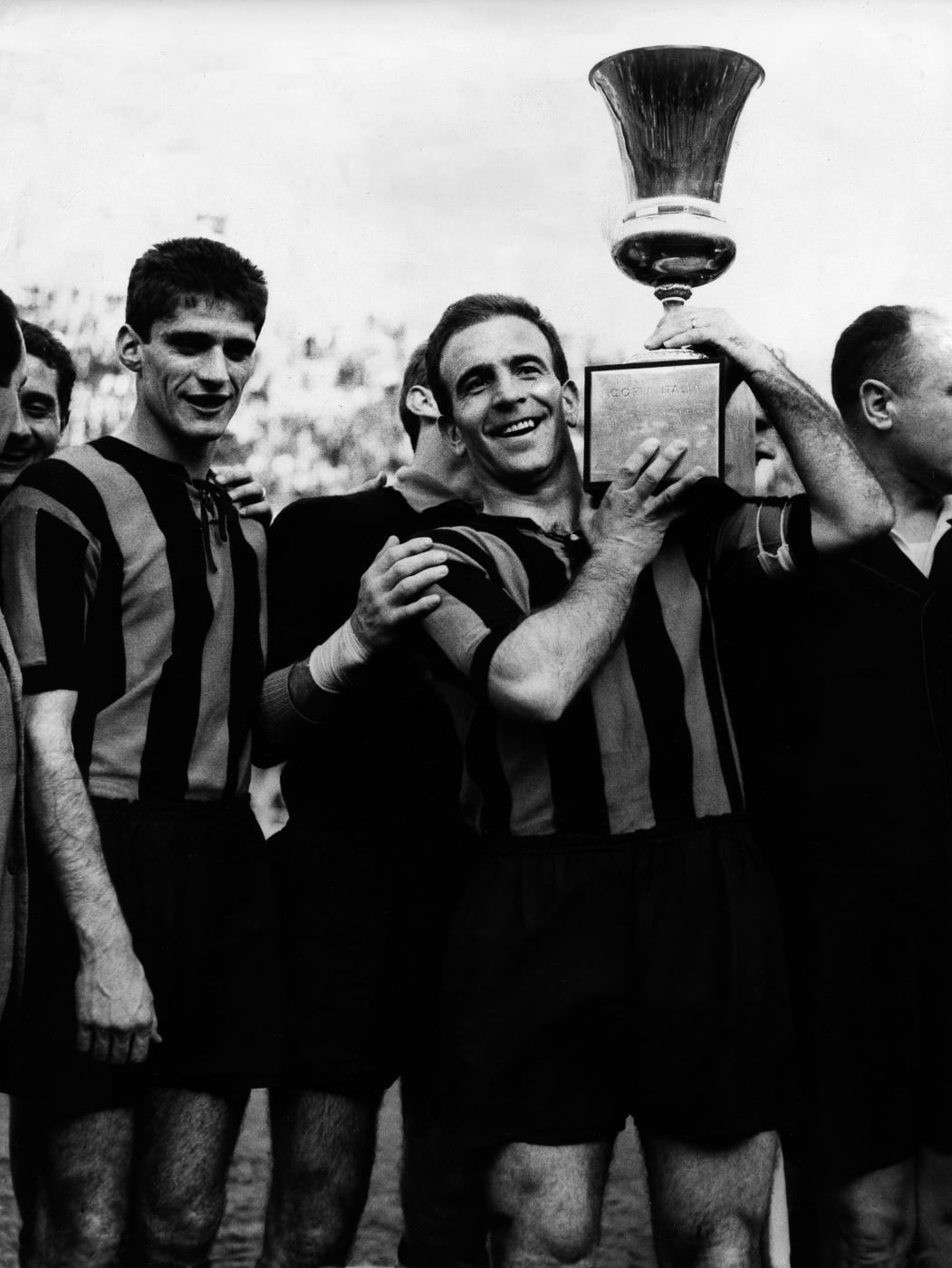
- Atalanta's captain Gardoni lift the trophy

Tournament details
- Country: Italy
- Dates: 1 September 1962 – 2 June 1963
- Teams: 38

Final positions
- Champions: Atalanta (1st title)
- Runners-up: Torino

Tournament statistics
- Matches played: 37
- Goals scored: 116 (3.14 per match)
- Top goal scorer(s): Angelo Domenghini (5 goals)

The 1962–63 Coppa Italia, the 16th Coppa Italia, was an Italian Football Federation domestic cup competition won by Atalanta. This was the club's first major trophy, and the only one until they won the 2023–24 UEFA Europa League.

== First round ==
Home team	Score	Away team
Padova	2–1	Vicenza
Udinese	0–3	Genoa
Cosenza	3–4 (a.e.t.)	Catania
Lazio	0–3	Fiorentina
Cagliari	1–5	Roma
Catanzaro	3–0	SPAL
Messina	2–1	Napoli
Bari	1–0	Palermo
Como	2–4 (a.e.t.)	Atalanta
Alessandria	0–5	Inter Milan
Parma	0–1	Milan
Pro Patria	1–2	Sampdoria
Triestina	1–1 (a.e.t.)*	Torino
Sambenedettese	0–1	Bologna
Foggia	3–0	Modena
Brescia	2–5	Juventus
Monza	2–3	Venezia
Lucchese	1–1 (a.e.t.)*	Mantova
Hellas Verona	3–0	Lecco

* Torino and Lucchese qualified after drawing of lots.

== Intermediate round ==
Home team	Score	Away team
Fiorentina	0-2	Genoa
Roma	3-1	Catanzaro
Foggia	0-2	Juventus

== Round of 16 ==
Home team	Score	Away team
Atalanta	2-1	Catania
Roma	2-5	Genoa
Milan	0-1	Sampdoria
Bologna	2-2 (p: 3–4)	Torino
Juventus	3-1	Venezia
Bari	2-0	Messina
Hellas Verona	1-1 (p: 6–5)	Lucchese
Internazionale	1-2	Padova

p=after penalty shoot-out

== Quarter-finals ==
Home team	Score	Away team
Atalanta	2-0	Padova
Bari	2-1 (aet)	Genoa
Sampdoria	0-2	Torino
Juventus	0-1	Hellas Verona

== Semi-finals ==
Home team	Score	Away team
Torino	2-1	Hellas Verona
Atalanta	1-0	Bari

== Final ==
2 June 1963

Atalanta	3–1	Torino
Domenghini 4', 48', 81'		Ferrini 84'

San Siro, Milan
Attendance: 30,000
Referee: Antonio Sbardella

== Top goalscorers ==
Rank	Player	Club	Goals
1	(Italy) Angelo Domenghini	Atalanta	5
2	(Italy) Bruno Nicolè	Juventus	4
3	(Italy) Giampaolo Piaceri	Torino	3
