= Sarpi =

Sarpi may refer to:

- Sarpi, Georgia, a village by the Black Sea
- Sarpi, Paschim Bardhaman, a census town in West Bengal, India
- Paolo Sarpi, 16th-century Venetian Servite friar and historian
  - Liceo Classico Paolo Sarpi, a high school in Bergamo, Italy

== See also ==
- Sarpy (disambiguation)
- Sapri, a town and comune in Salerno, Italy
