= Education in Italy =

Ministero dell'Istruzione e del Merito
- Minister of Education and Merit: Giuseppe Valditara

National education budget (2016)
- Budget: €65 billion

General details
- Primary languages: Italian
- System type: public
- Compulsory primary education: 1859

Literacy (2015)
- Total: 99.2%
- Post secondary: 386,000

Education in Italy is compulsory from 6 to 16 years of age, and is divided into five stages: kindergarten (scuola dell'infanzia), primary school (scuola primaria or scuola elementare), lower secondary school (scuola secondaria di primo grado or scuola media inferiore), upper secondary school (scuola secondaria di secondo grado or scuola media superiore), and university (università). Education is free in Italy and free education is available to children of all nationalities who are residents in Italy. Italy has both a private and public education system.

In 2018, the Italian secondary education was evaluated as below the OECD average. Italy scored below the OECD average in reading and science, and near OECD average in mathematics. Mean performance in Italy declined in reading and science, and remained stable in mathematics. Trento and Bolzano scored at an above the national average in reading. A wide gap exists between northern schools, which perform near average, and schools in the south, that had much poorer results. The 2018 Progress in International Reading Literacy Study ranks children in Italy 16th for reading.

Tertiary education in Italy is divided between public universities, private universities and the prestigious and selective superior graduate schools, such as the Scuola Normale Superiore di Pisa. Bologna University, founded in 1088, is the oldest university in continuous operation, as well as one of the leading academic institutions in Italy and Europe. The Bocconi University, Università Cattolica del Sacro Cuore, LUISS, Polytechnic University of Turin, Polytechnic University of Milan, Sapienza University of Rome, and University of Milan are also ranked among the best in the world.

== History ==
Literacy rates in Italy in 1861, shortly after the proclamation of the Kingdom of Italy. Italy lacks Lazio and the Triveneto, which were subsequently annexed.

In Italy a state school system or Education System has existed since 1859, when the Legge Casati (Casati Act) mandated educational responsibilities for the forthcoming Italian state (Italian unification took place in 1861). The Casati Act made primary education compulsory, and had the goal of increasing literacy. This law gave control of primary education to the single towns, of secondary education to the provinces, and the universities were managed by the State. Even with the Casati Act and compulsory education, in rural (and southern) areas children often were not sent to school (the rate of children enrolled in primary education would reach 90% only after 70 years) and the illiteracy rate (which was nearly 80% in 1861) took more than 50 years to halve.

The next important law concerning the Italian education system was the Gentile Reform. This act was issued in 1923, thus when Benito Mussolini and his National Fascist Party were in power. In fact, Giovanni Gentile was appointed the task of creating an education system deemed fit for the fascist system. The compulsory age of education was raised to 14 years, and was somewhat based on a ladder system: after the first five years of primary education, one could choose the scuola media, which would give further access to the liceo and other secondary education, or the avviamento al lavoro (work training), which was intended to give a quick entry into the low strates of the workforce. The reform enhanced the role of the liceo classico, created by the Casati Act in 1859 (and intended during the Fascist era as the peak of secondary education, with the goal of forming the future upper classes), and created the Technical, Commercial and Industrial institutes and the liceo scientifico. The liceo classico was the only secondary school that gave access to all types of higher education until 1968. The influence of Gentile's Italian idealism was great, and he considered the Catholic religion to be the "foundation and crowning" of education. In 1962, the avviamento al lavoro was abolished, and all children up to 14 years had to follow a single program, encompassing primary education (scuola elementare) and middle school (scuola media).

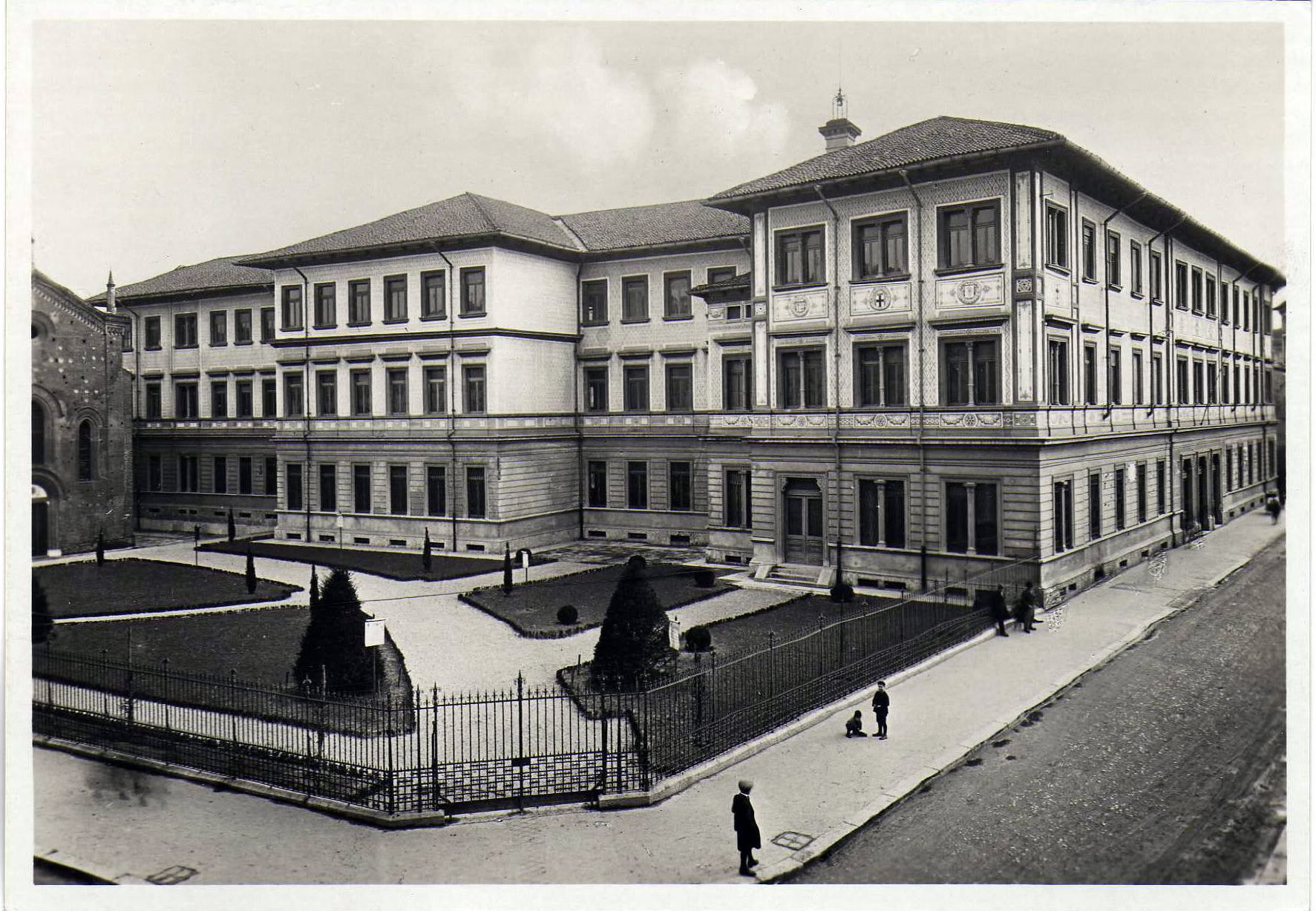
A high school in Milan in the 1920s

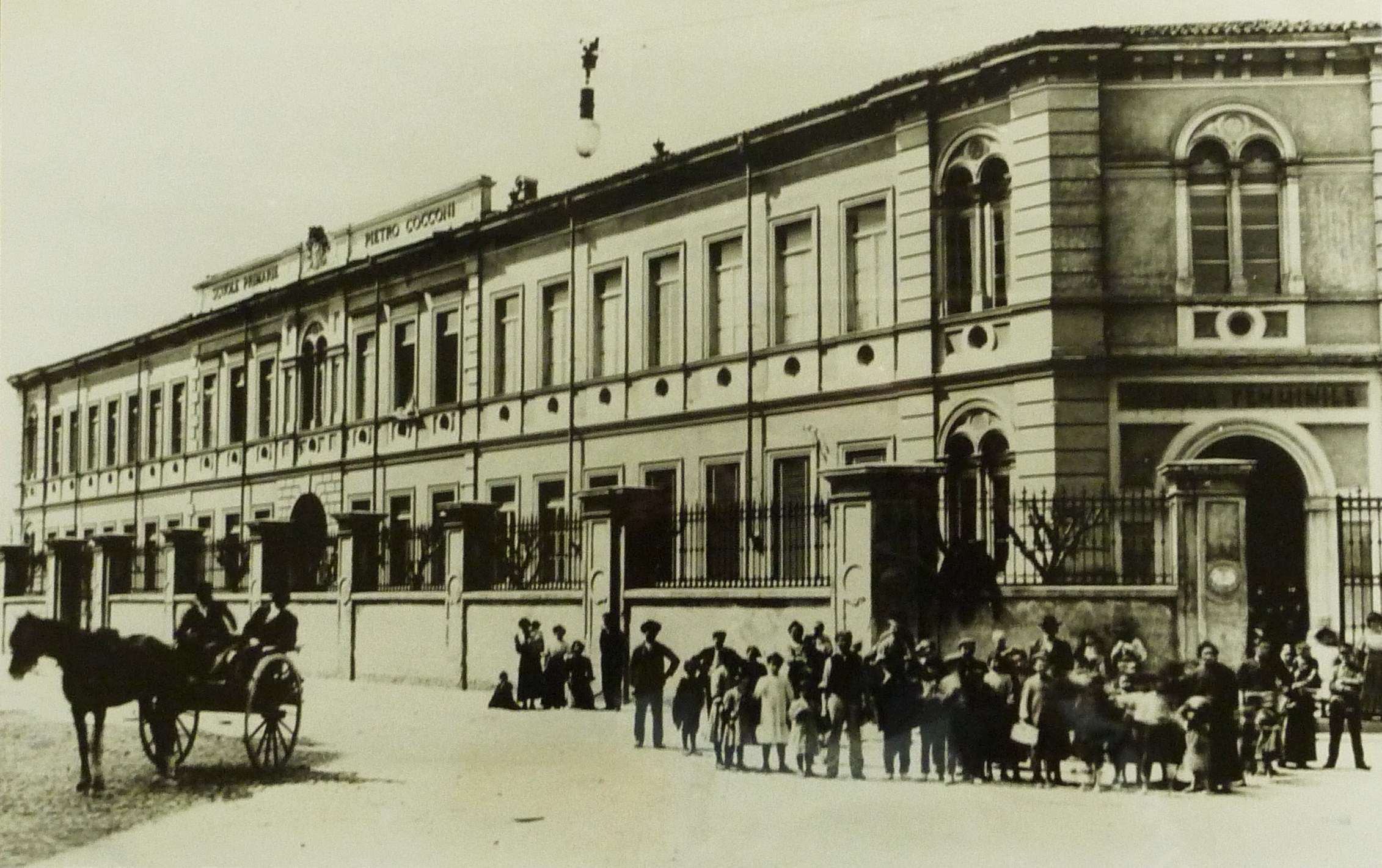
A primary school in Parma in 1905

From 1962 to the present day, the main structure of Italian primary (and secondary) education remained largely unchanged, even if some modifications were made: a narrowing of the gap between males and females (through the merging of the two distinct programmes for technical education, and the optional introduction of mixed-gender gym classes), a change in the structure of secondary school (legge Berlinguer) and the creation of new licei, istituti tecnici and istituti professionali, offering students a broader range of options.

In 1999, in accordance with the guidelines laid down by the Bologna Process, the Italian university system switched from the old system (vecchio ordinamento, which led to the traditional five-year Laurea degree), to the new system (nuovo ordinamento). The nuovo ordinamento split the former Laurea into two tracks: the Laurea triennale (a three-year degree akin to the Bachelor's Degree), followed by the 2-year Laurea specialistica (Master's Degree), the latter renamed Laurea Magistrale in 2007. A credit system was established to quantify the amount of work needed by each course and exam (25 work hours = 1 credit), as well as enhance the possibility to change course of studies and facilitate the transfer of credits for further studies or go on exchange (e.g. Erasmus Programme) in another country. However, it is now established that there is just a five-year degree Laurea Magistrale a Ciclo Unico for programmes such as Law and a six-year degree for Medicine.

In 2019, education minister Lorenzo Fioramonti announced that in 2020 Italy would become the first country in the world to make the study of climate change and sustainable development mandatory for students.

== Primary education ==
An Italian handwriting script, taught in primary school

Primary school (scuola primaria, also known as scuola elementare), is commonly preceded by three years of non-compulsory nursery school (or kindergarten, asilo). Primary school lasts five years. Until middle school, the educational curriculum is the same for all pupils: although one can attend a private or state-funded school, the subjects studied are the same (with the exception of special schools for the blind or the hearing-impaired): the students are given a basic education in Italian, English, mathematics, natural sciences, history, geography, social studies, and physical education. Some schools also have Spanish or French, musical arts and visual arts.

Students usually start primary school at 6, but students born between January and March who are still 5 years old can access primary school early; this is called primina and the students doing it are called anticipatari. For example, a student born in February 2002 can attend primary school with students born in 2001.

Until 2004, pupils had to pass an exam to access middle school (scuola secondaria di primo grado), which comprised in the composition of a short essay in Italian, a written math test, and an oral test on the other subjects. The exam has now been discontinued and pupils can now directly enter middle school without any exam.

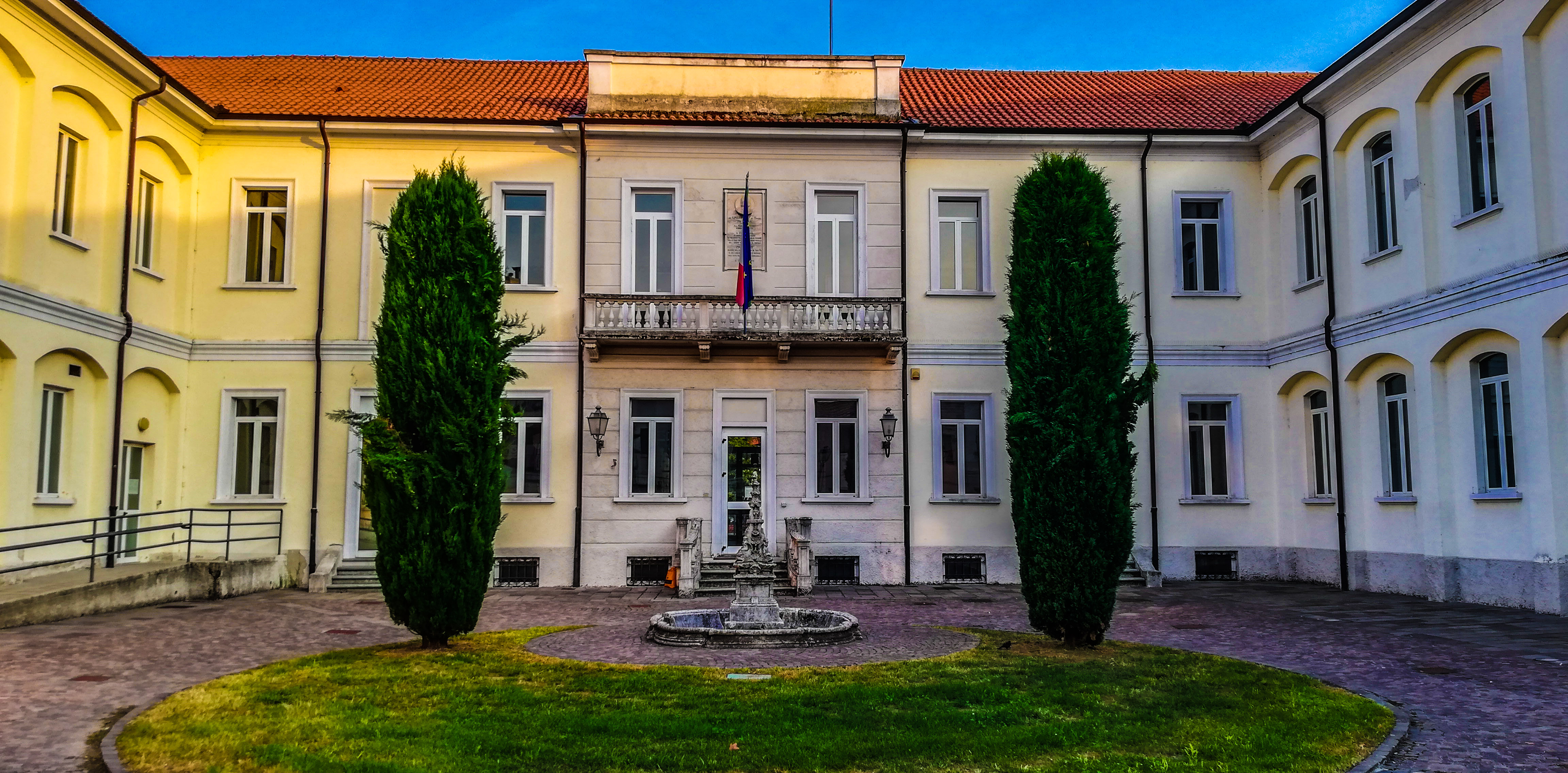
Primary school in Parabiago, Lombardy

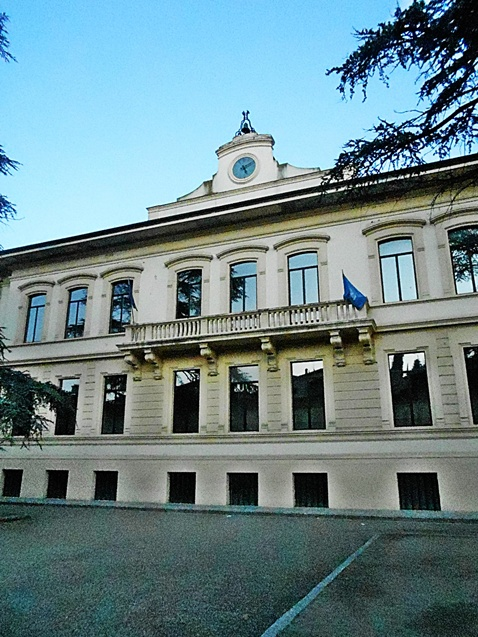
Primary school in Signa, Tuscany

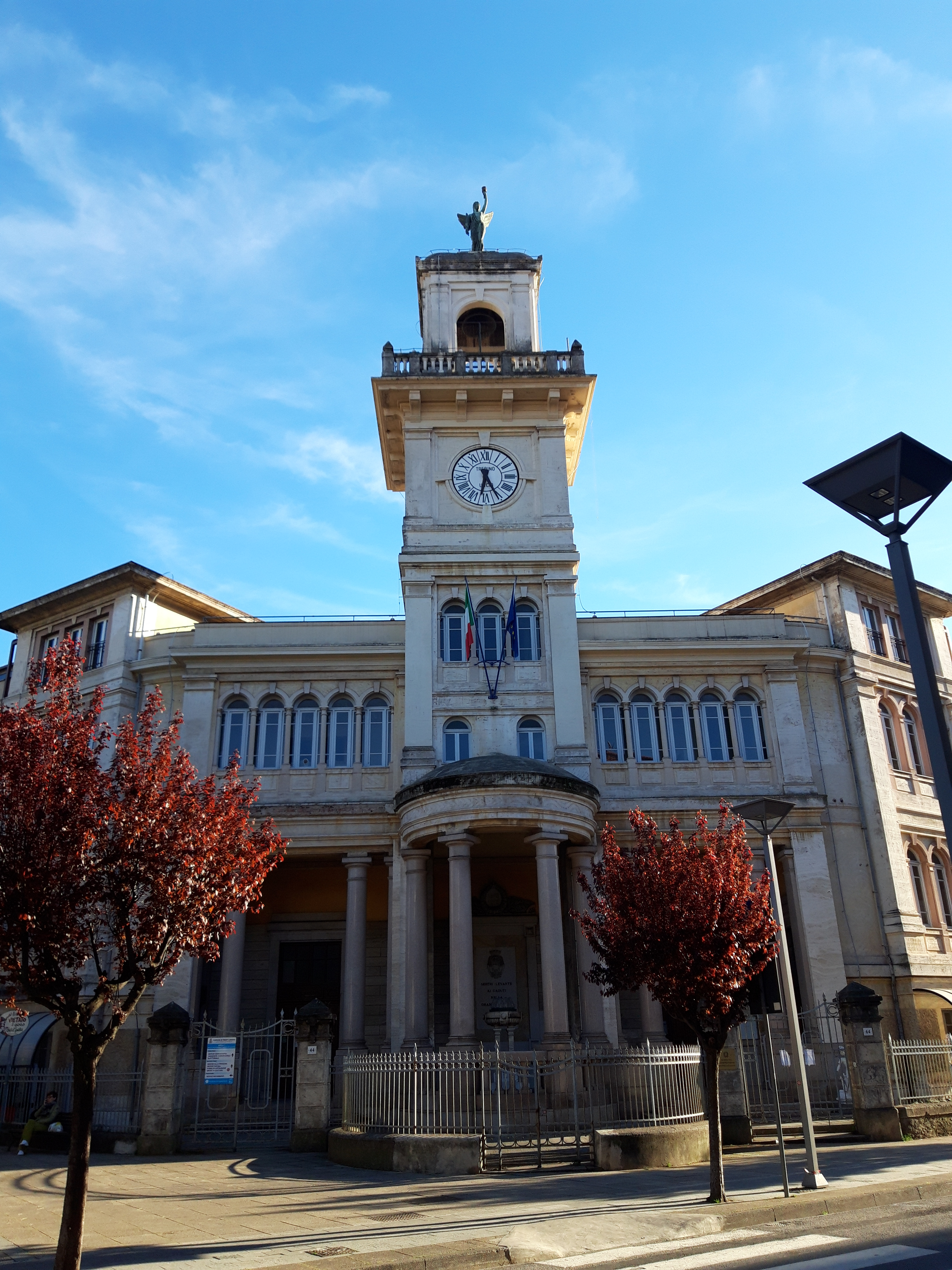
Primary school in Sestri Levante, Liguria

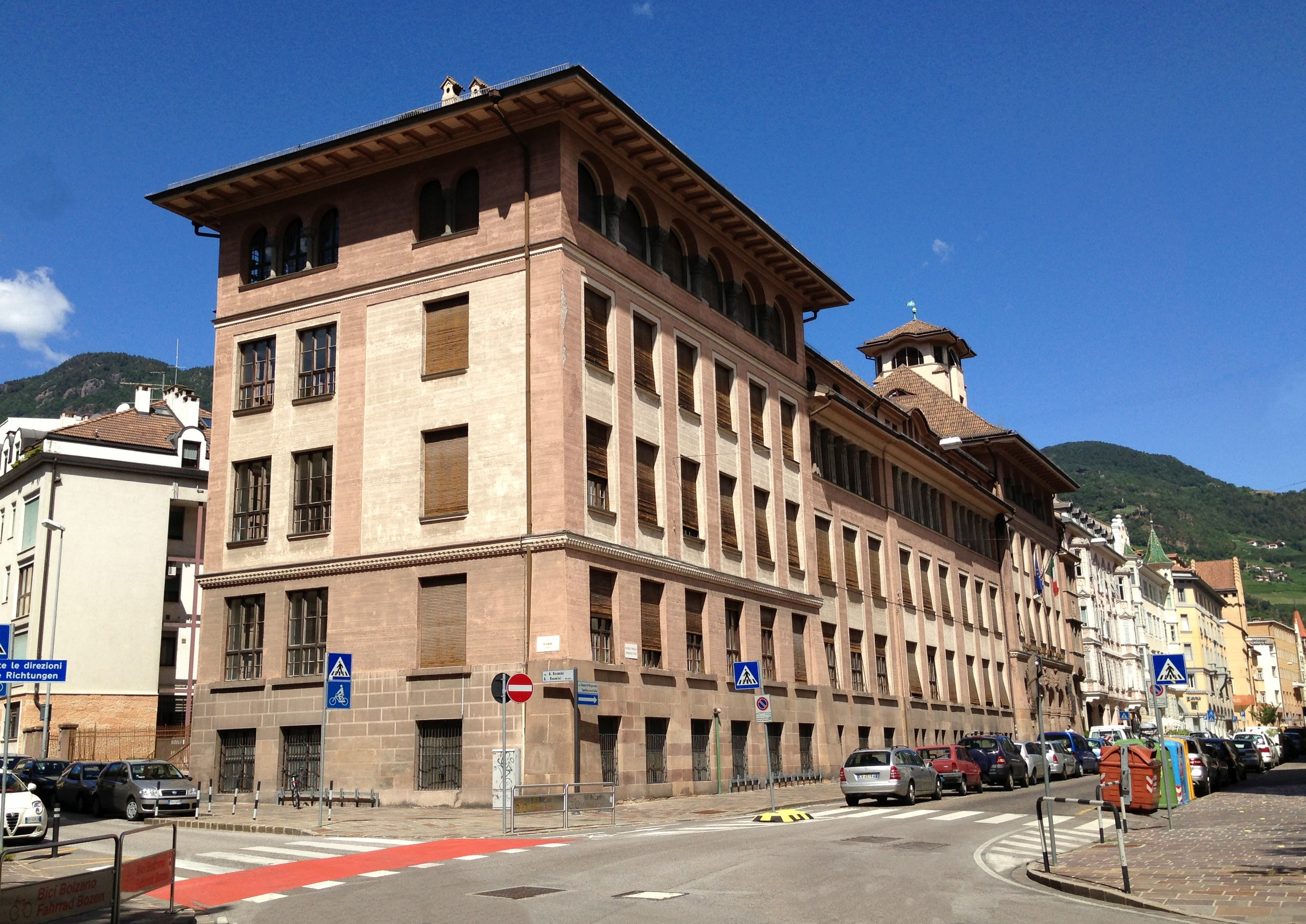
Primary school in Bolzano, Trentino-Alto Adige/Südtirol

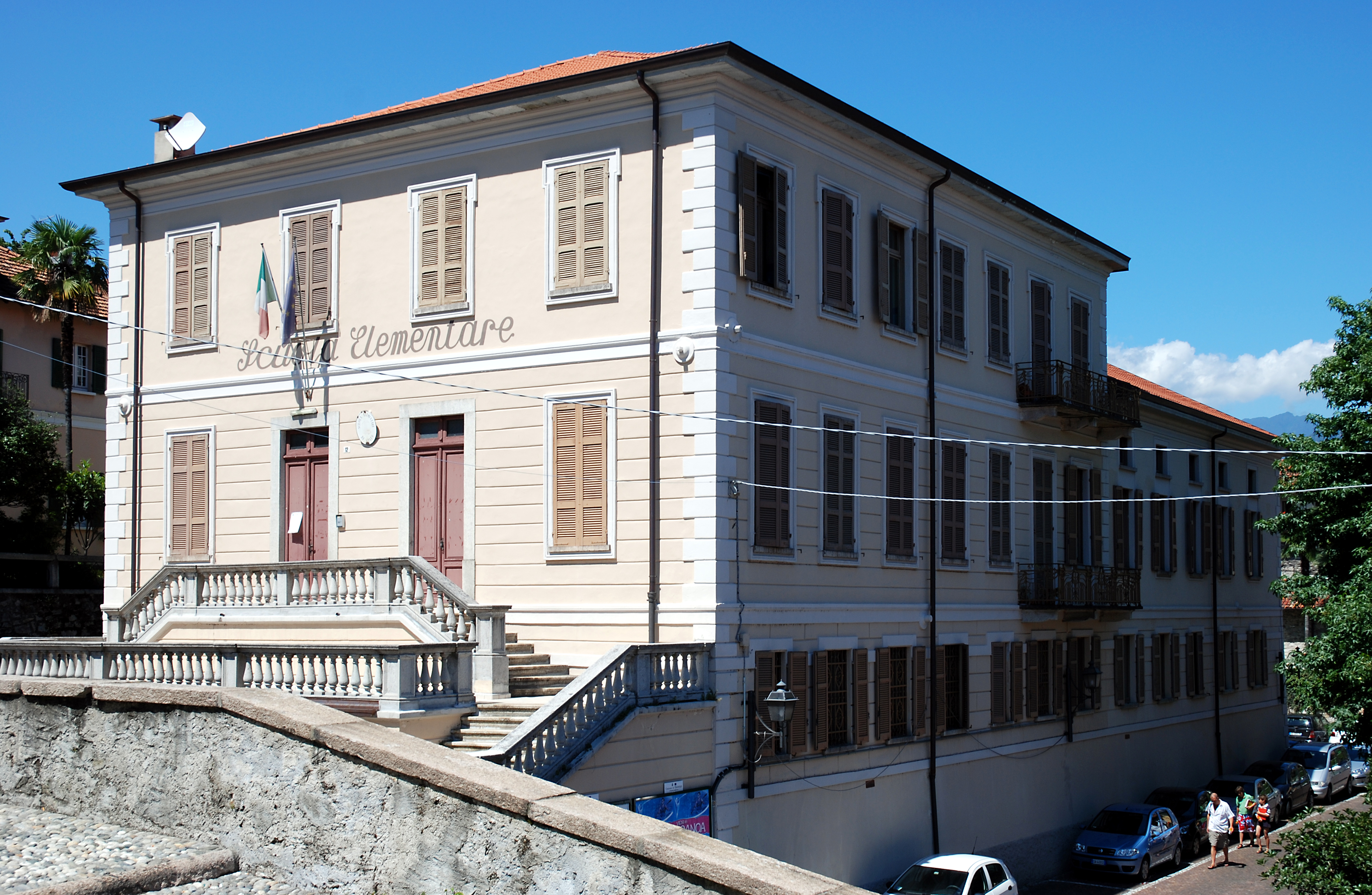
Primary school in Baveno, Piedmont

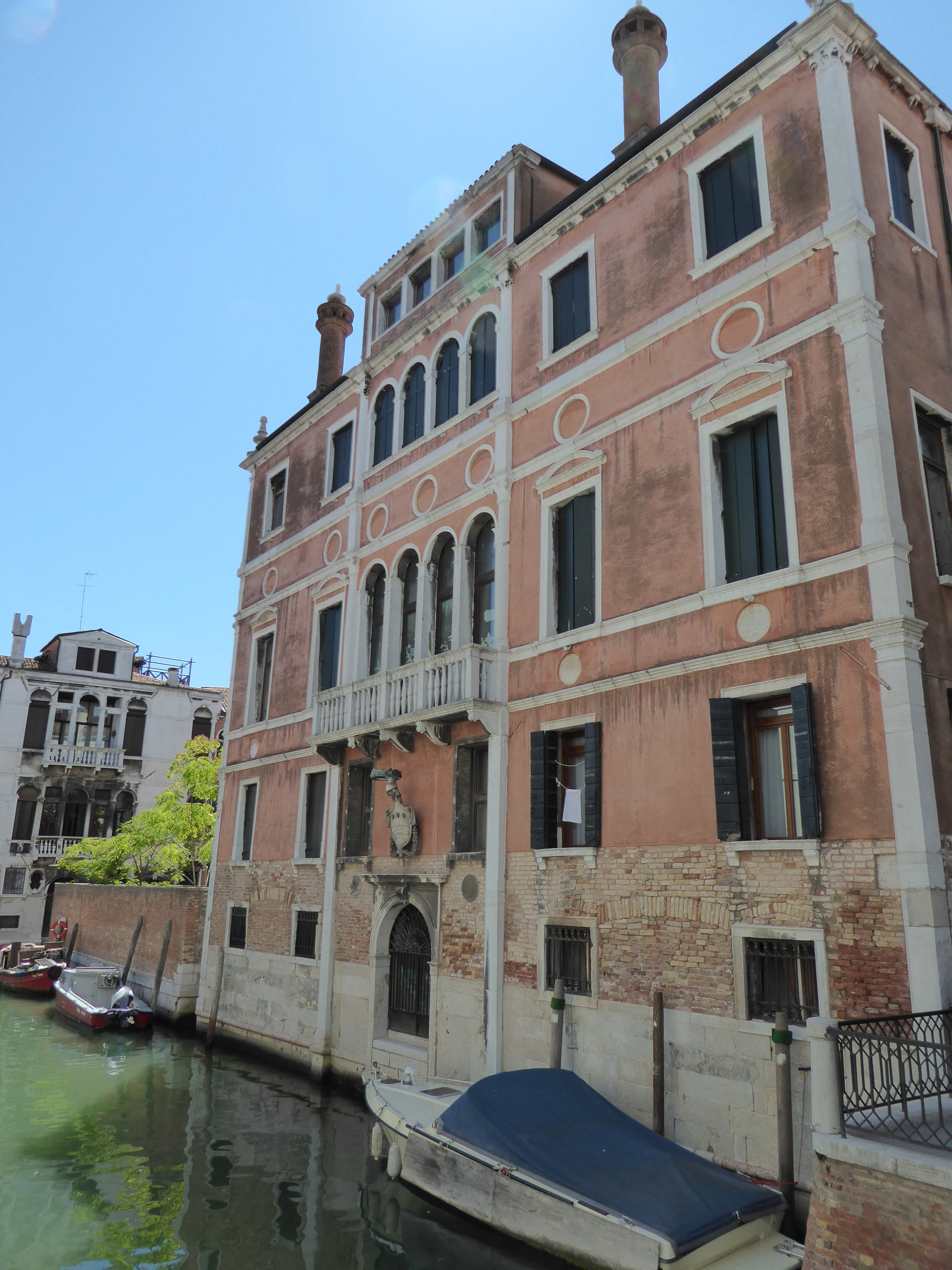
Primary school in Venice, Veneto

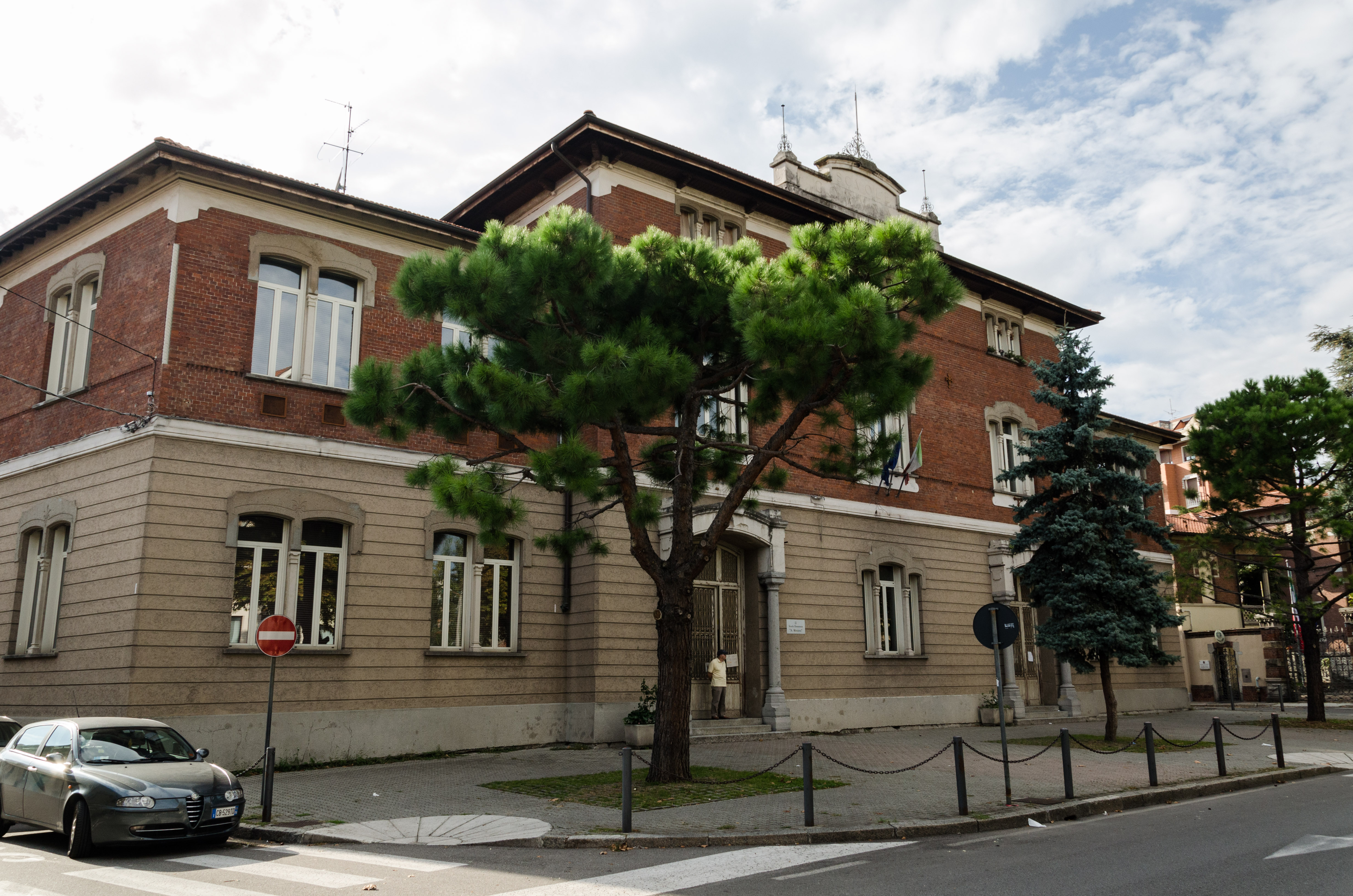
Primary school in Busto Arsizio, Lombardy

== Secondary education ==
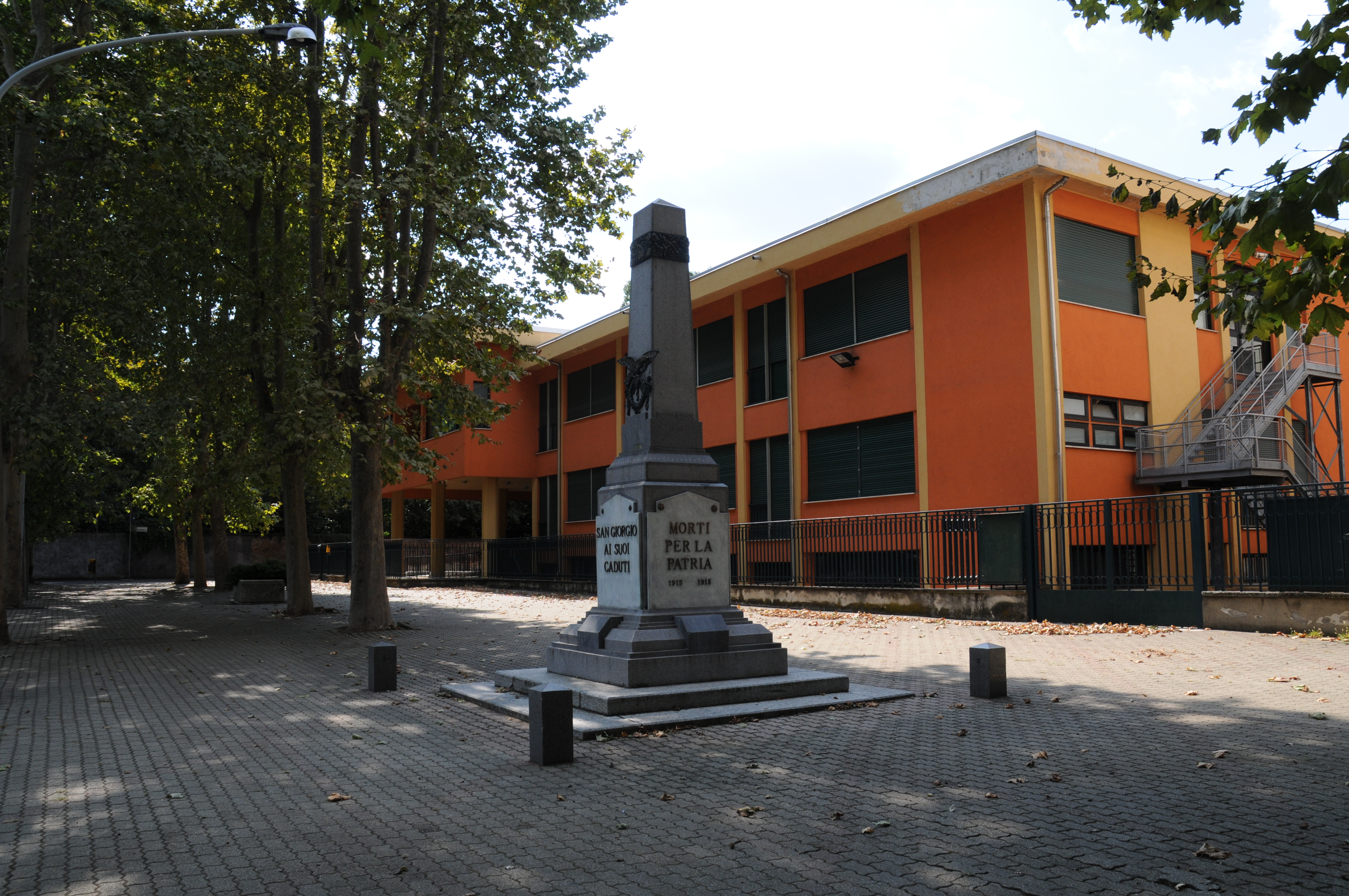
A middle school in San Giorgio su Legnano, Lombardy

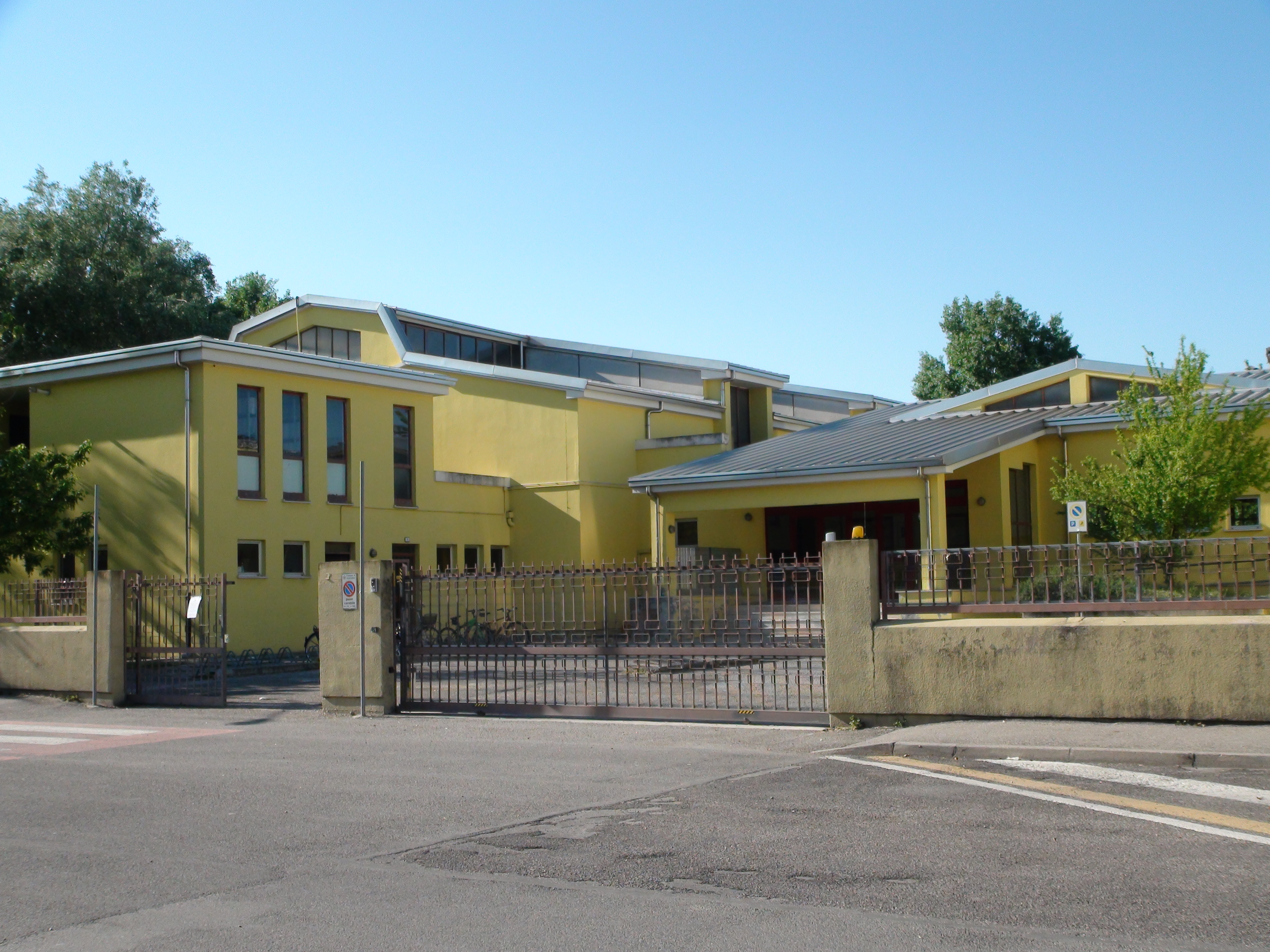
A middle school in Suzzara, Lombardy

Secondary education in Italy lasts 8 years and is divided into two stages: middle school (scuola secondaria di primo grado, commonly referred to as scuola media) and high school (scuola secondaria di secondo grado, commonly referred to as scuola superiore). Middle school lasts three years (usually from age 11 to 14), and high school lasts five years (usually from age 14 to 19). Every tier involves an exam at the end of the final year, required to earn a degree and have access to the next degree of education. Both in middle school and high school, students stay in the classroom for most of the time (except PE, which often takes place in the gym), so the teachers are the ones who have to move from one classroom to another during the day.

In middle school pupils go to school from Monday to Saturday starting school at 8:00 am and finishing at 1:00 pm, or from Monday to Friday starting at 8:00 am and finishing at 2:00 pm. School times may vary by school. In High School, you attend school from 4 to 8 hours a day, depending on the rules and type of the school.

Usually, there are no breaks between each class, but most schools have 15 to 30 minute break around halfway through the school day, or they can also split it in two shorter breaks. This especially happens in middle schools. If students have to stay in school after lunch, there's a longer break to let them eat and rest (usually no more than 30 minutes or 1 hour) but the food is generally not provided by the school.

There are three types of high school, subsequently divided into further specializations. There are some common subjects taught in each of these, such as Italian, English, maths and history, but most subjects are exclusive to a particular type of school (i.e. ancient Greek in the liceo classico, business economics in the Istituto tecnico economico or scenography in the liceo artistico):

- Liceo ('lyceum')

The education received in a liceo is mostly theoretical, with a specialization in a specific field of studies such as:
- humanities and antiquity (liceo classico),
- mathematics and science (liceo scientifico),
- foreign languages (liceo linguistico),
- psychology and pedagogy (liceo delle scienze umane),
- social science (liceo economico-sociale),
- fine arts (liceo artistico).

Additionally, some lyceums offer specialized classes (indirizzi) where students may have more hours for specific subjects, receive lessons taught in English, or explore additional subjects. For instance, in the liceo scientifico, there are indirizzo liceo scientifico (or indirizzo tradizionale), with Latin, or indirizzo liceo scientifico-scienze applicate, which includes informatics.

- Istituto tecnico ('technical institute')

The education given in an istituto tecnico offers both theoretical education and specialization in a specific field of studies (e.g.: economy, administration, technology, tourism, agronomy), often integrated with a three or six months internship in a company, association or university, from the third to the fifth of study.

- Istituto professionale ('professional institute')

This type of school offers a form of secondary education oriented towards practical subjects (engineering, agriculture, gastronomy, technical assistance, handcrafts), and enables students to start searching for a job as soon as they have completed their studies, sometimes sooner, as some schools offer a diploma after three years instead of five.

High School is generally divided into 3 periods. The first the first 2 years (or biennio) where composulry education ends, the next two years (or secondo biennio) where students delve more into specialized subjects, and the final year, where students prepare for the Esame Di Maturita (formally known as the Esame di Stato till 2025). The Esame di Matruita takes place every year between June and July and is required to graduate highschool, while also granting access to university. The exam consists of an oral examination and written tests. Some of them, like the written Italian test, are equal for each type of school, while others differ depending on the type of school. For example, liceo classico students have to take a Latin or ancient Greek written exam, while Liceo scientifico students have to take a mathematics or physics exam. An Italian student is usually 19 when they enter university.

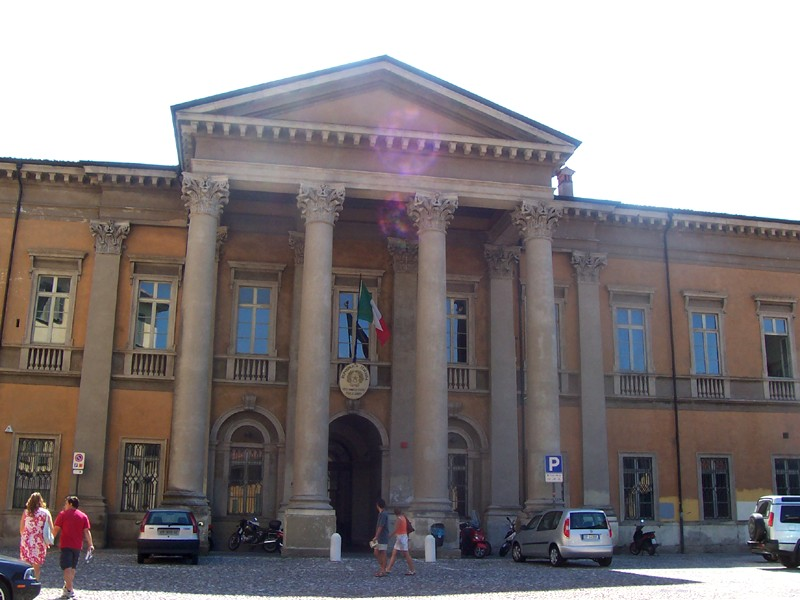
Liceo Classico Paolo Sarpi in Bergamo, Lombardy

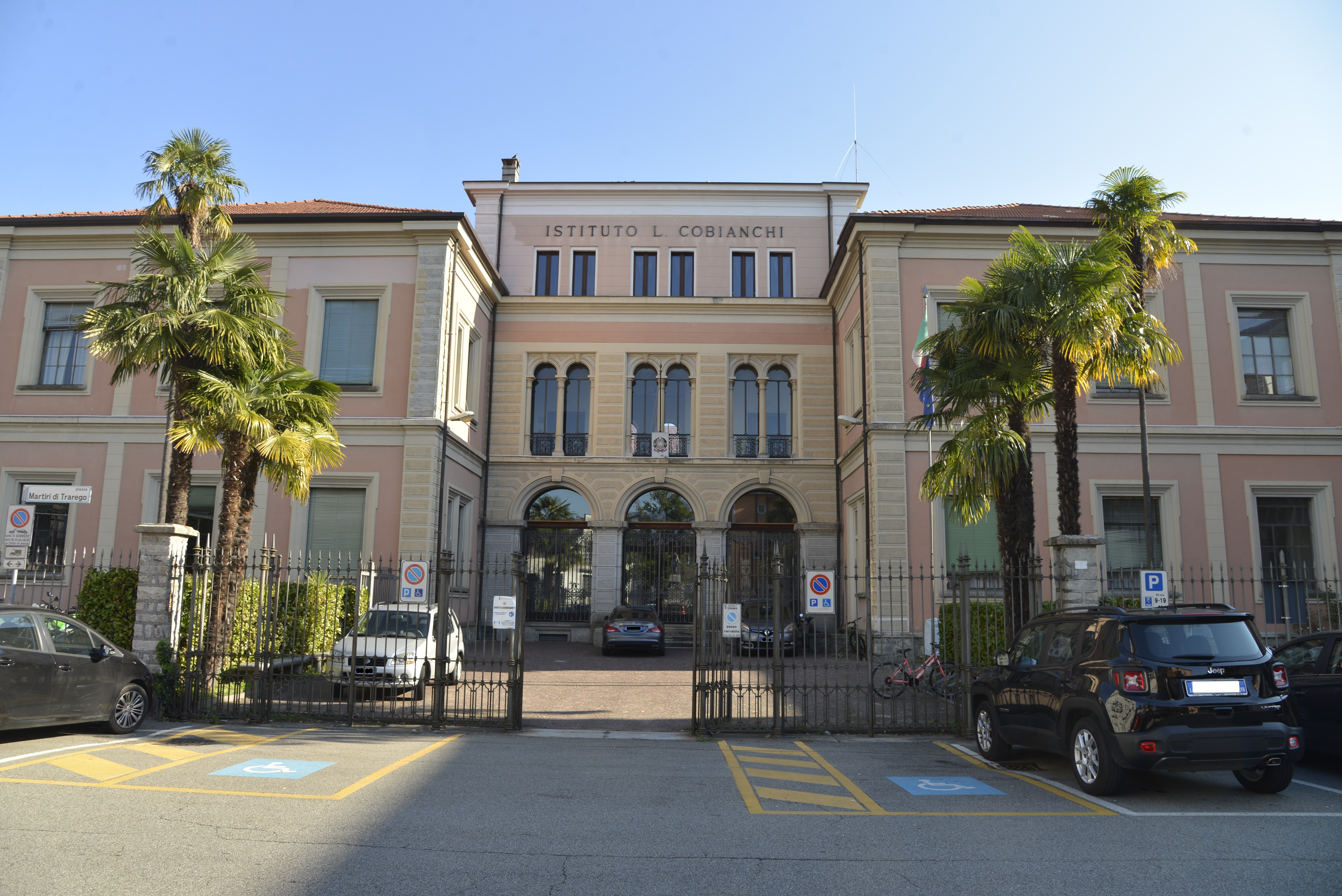
Istituto tecnico Lorenzo Cobianchi in Verbania, Piedmont

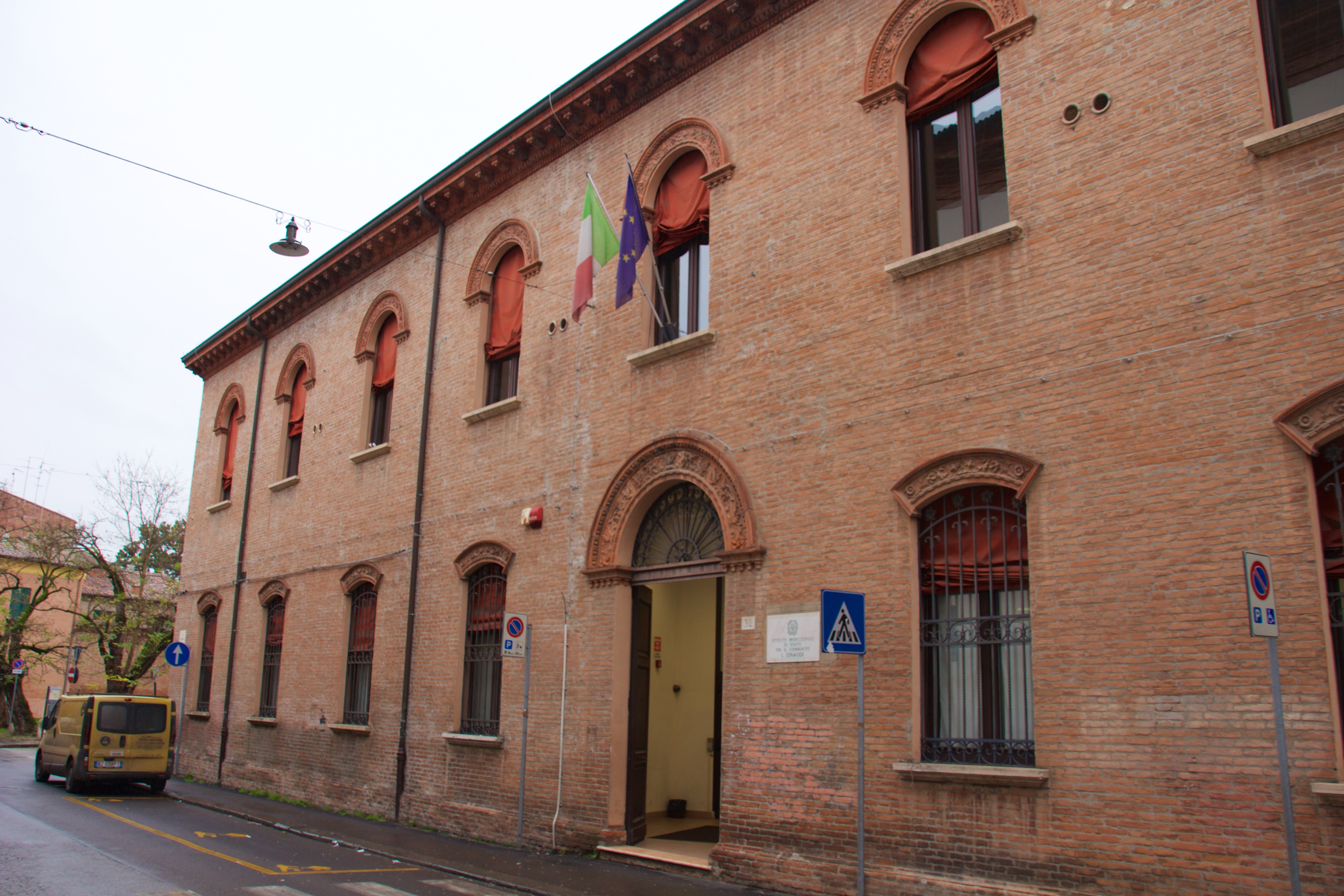
Istituto professionale Luigi Einaudi in Ferrara, Emilia-Romagna

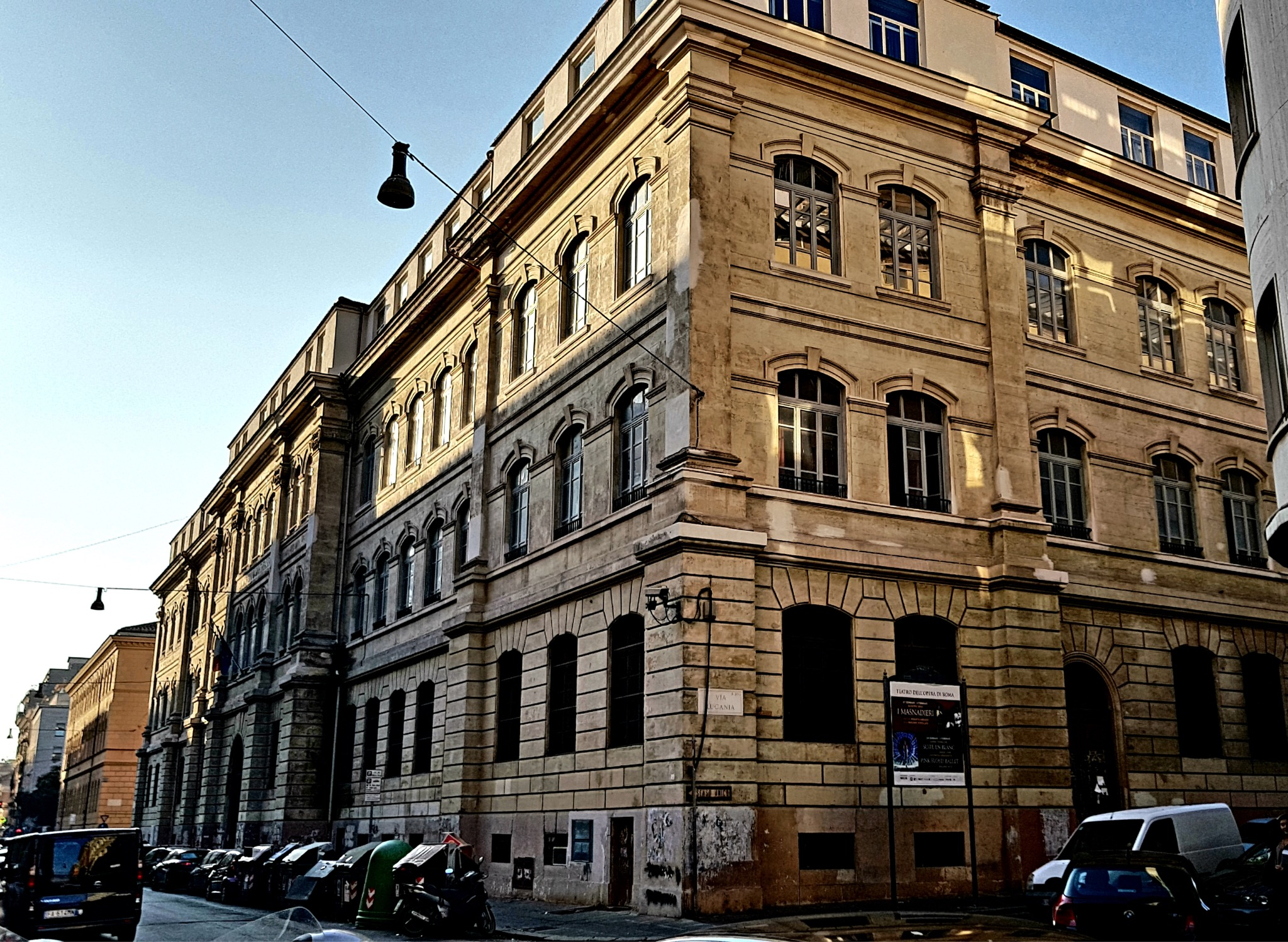
A high school in Rome, the Liceo Torquato Tasso, Lazio

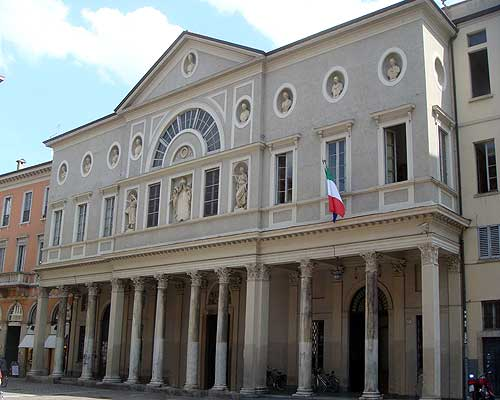
A high school in Como, the Liceo Alessandro Volta, Lombardy

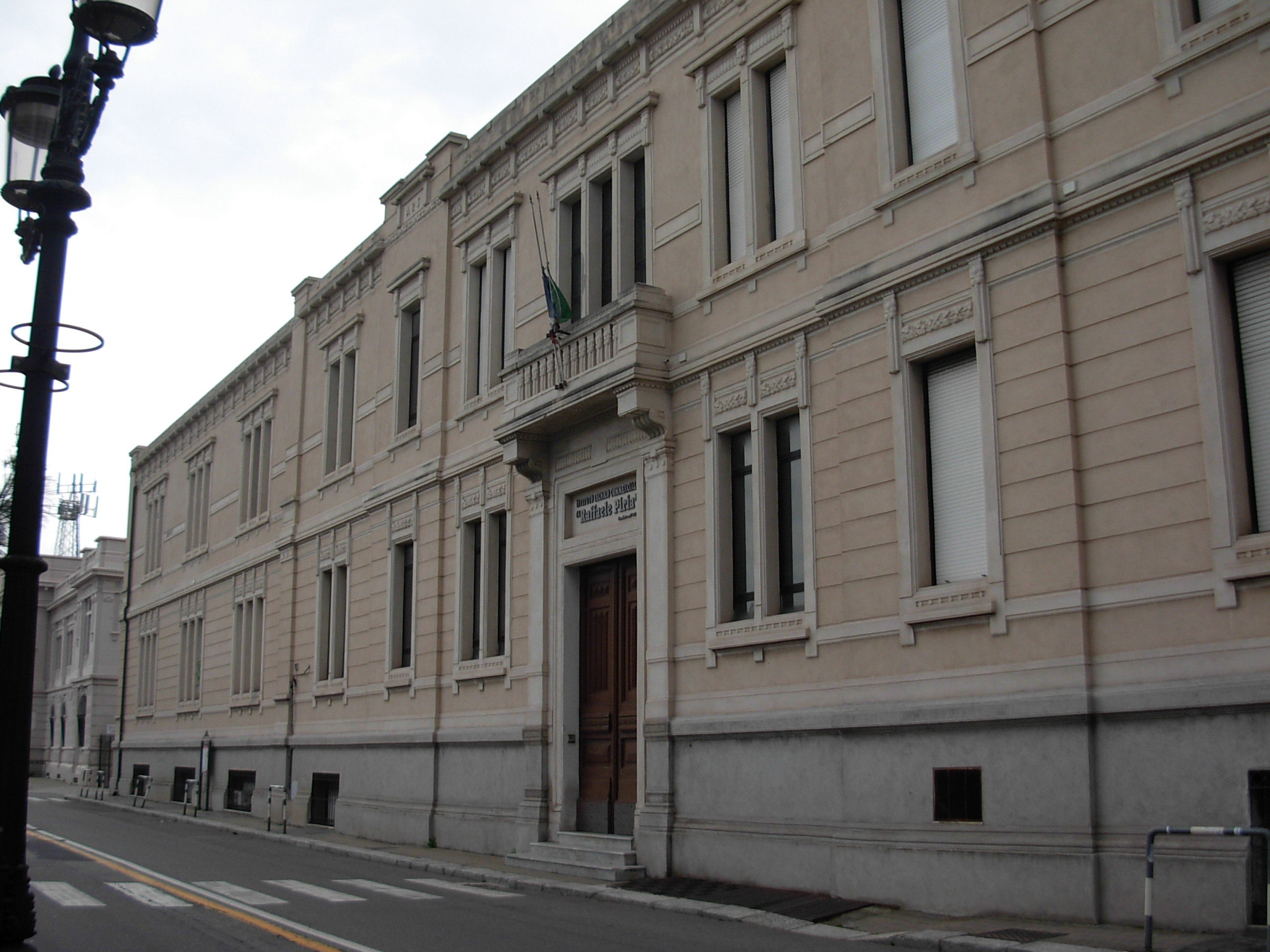
A high school in Empoli, the istituto tecnico economico Raffaele Piria, Tuscany

== Higher education ==
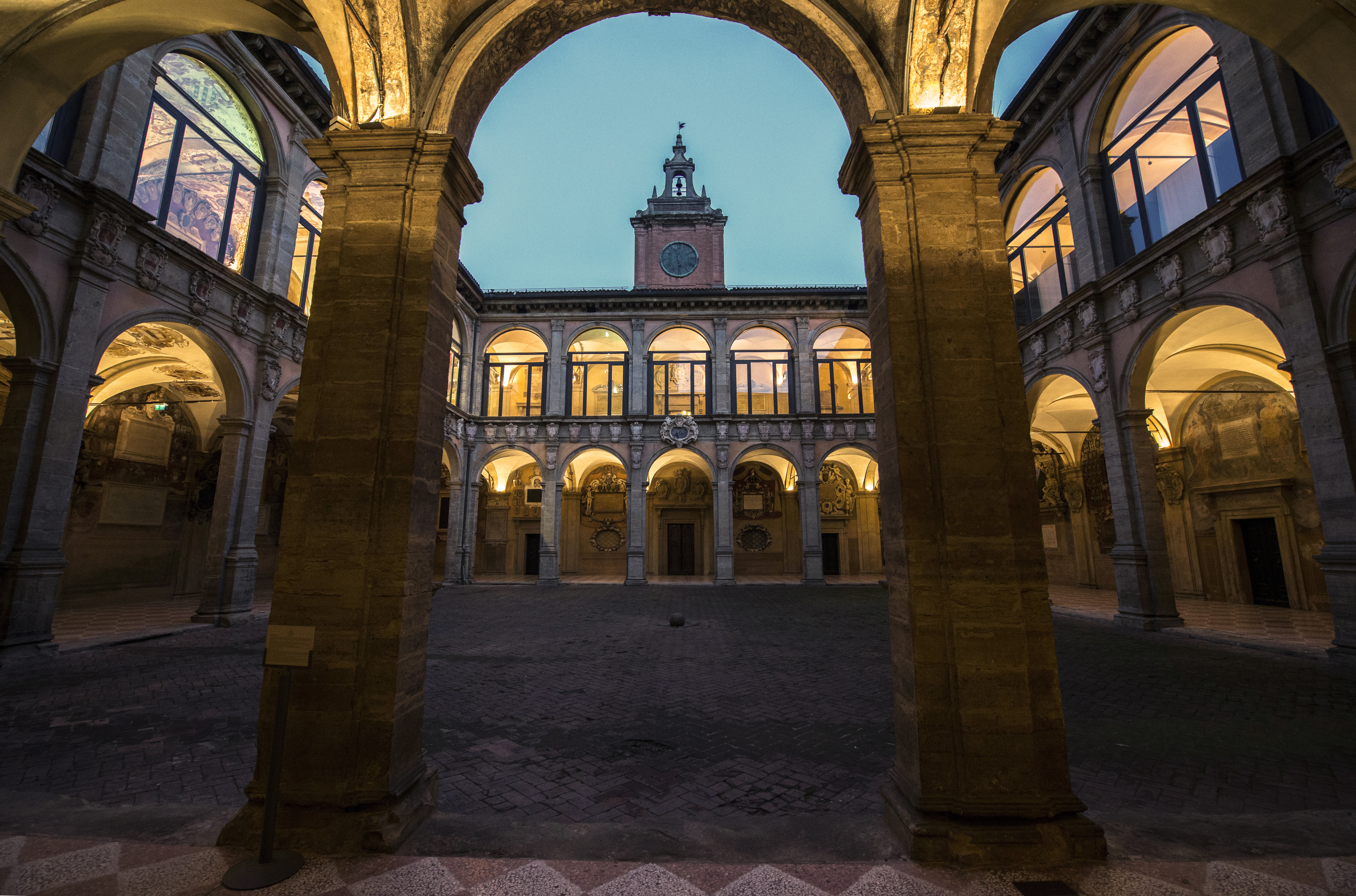
University of Bologna, established in AD 1088, is the world's oldest university in continuous operation.

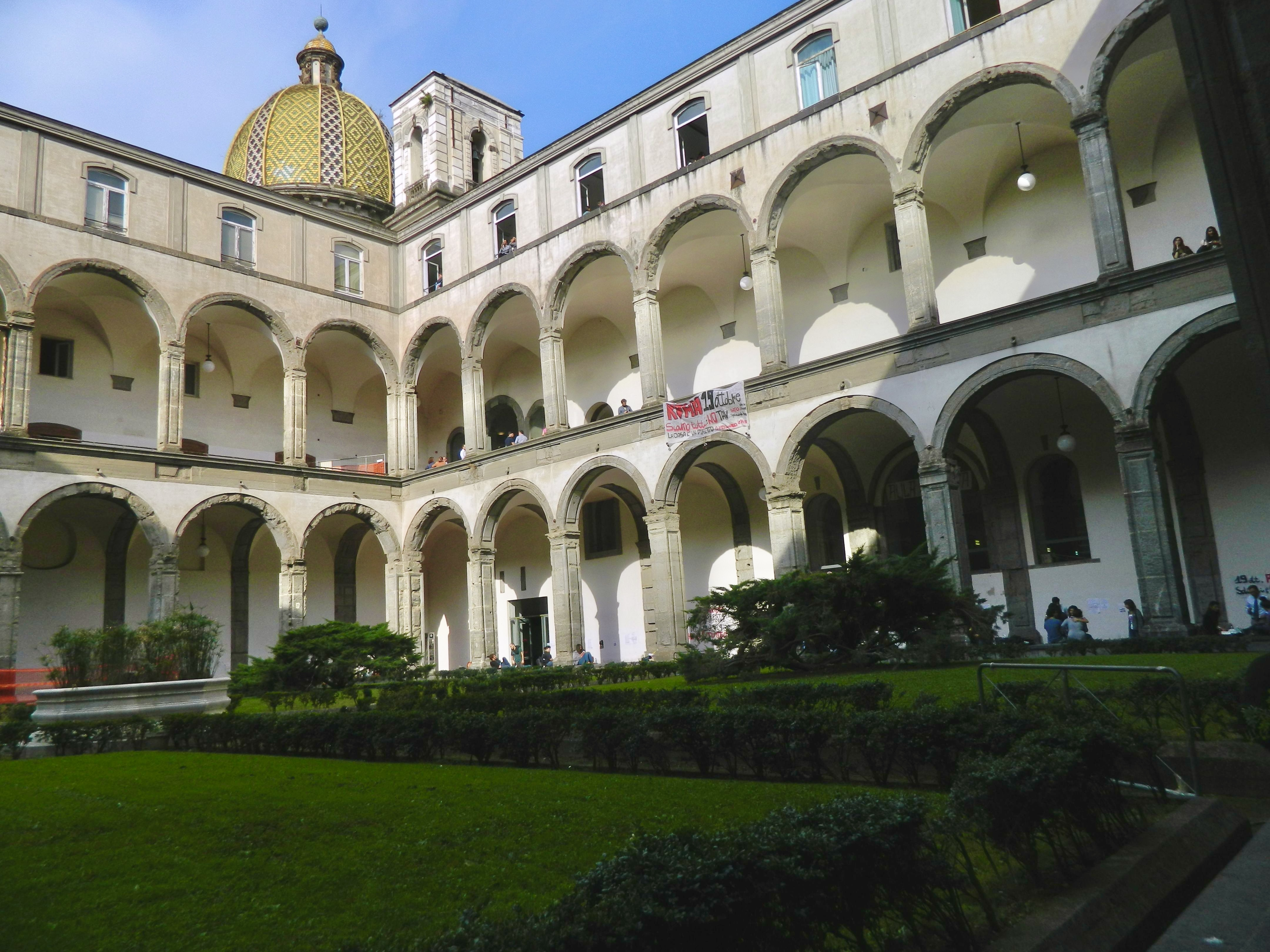
Established in 1224 by Frederick II, Holy Roman Emperor, University of Naples Federico II, in Italy, is the world's oldest state-funded university in continuous operation.

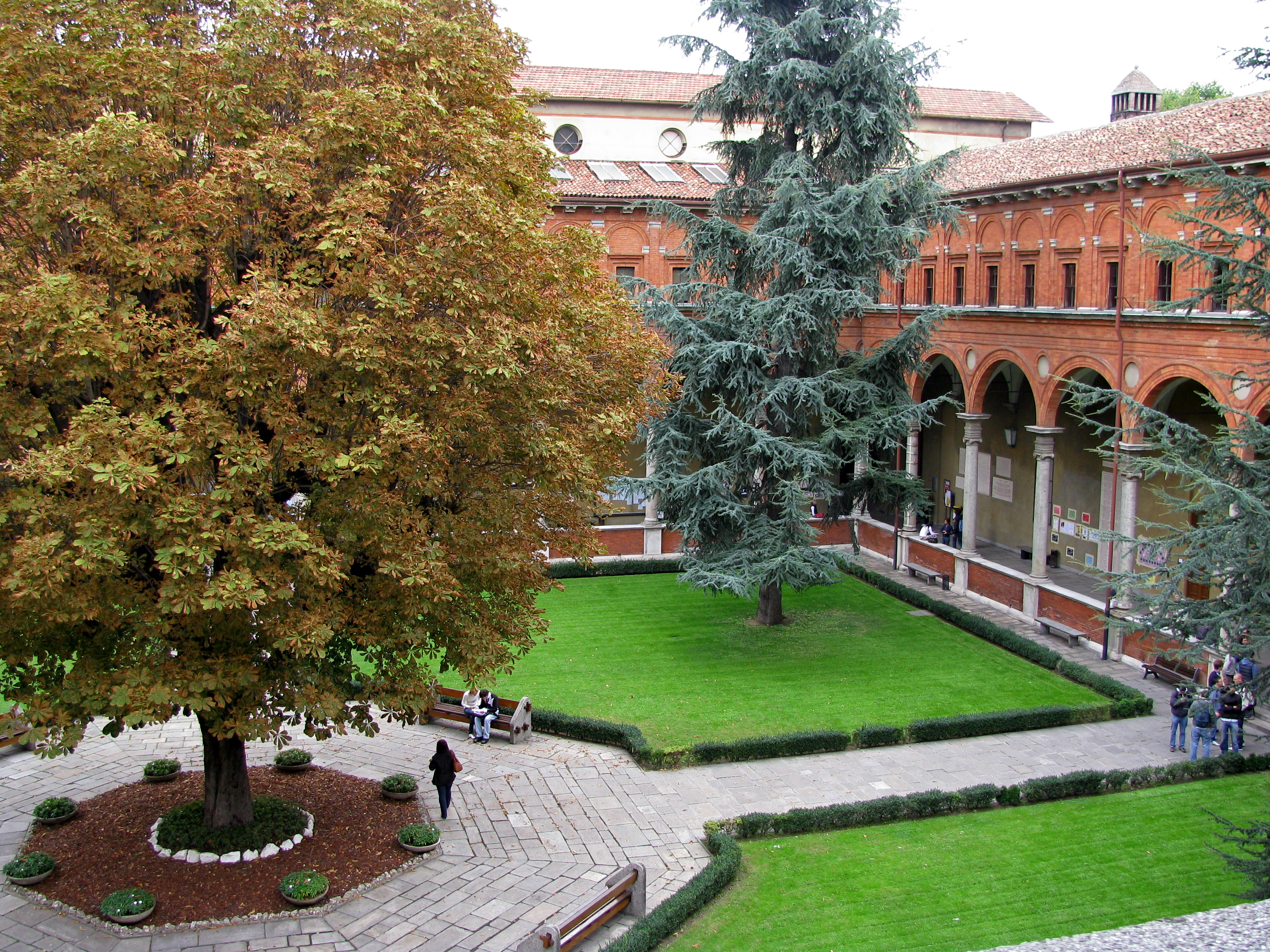
Università Cattolica del Sacro Cuore, an Italian private research university founded in 1921. Its main campus is located in Milan, Italy, with satellite campuses in Brescia, Piacenza, Cremona and Rome. Degrees are offered both in Italian and in English.

Italy has a large national and international network of public or state-affiliated universities and schools offering degrees in higher education. State-run universities of Italy constitute the main percentage of tertiary education in Italy and are managed under the supervision of Italian's Ministry of Education.

Italian universities are among the oldest universities in the world; the University of Bologna (founded in 1088) notably, is the oldest one ever; the University of Naples Federico II (founded in 1224) is the world's oldest state-funded university in continuous operation. Most universities in Italy are state-supported.

There are also a number of Superior Graduate Schools (Grandes écoles) or Scuola Superiore Universitaria, which offer officially recognized titles, including the Diploma di Perfezionamento equivalent to a Doctorate, Dottorato di Ricerca i.e. Research Doctorate or Doctor Philosophiae i.e. PhD. Some of them also organize Master's degree courses. There are three Superior Graduate Schools with "university status", three institutes with the status of Doctoral Colleges, which function at graduate and post-graduate level. Nine further schools are direct offshoots of the universities (i.e. do not have their own 'university status'). The first one is the Scuola Normale Superiore di Pisa, which was founded in 1810 by Napoleon as a branch of the École Normale Supérieure, taking with it its famous organization model. These institutions are commonly referred to as "Schools of Excellence" (i.e. Scuole di Eccellenza).

33 Italian universities were ranked among the world's top 500 in 2019, the third-largest number in Europe after the United Kingdom and Germany. In 2009, the University of Bologna was, according to The Times, the only Italian college in the top 200 World Universities. Milan's Bocconi University has been ranked among the top 20 best business schools in the world by The Wall Street Journal international rankings, especially thanks to its M.B.A. program, which in 2007 placed it no. 17 in the world in terms of graduate recruitment preference by major multinational companies. Bocconi was also ranked by Forbes as the best worldwide in the specific category Value for Money. In May 2008, Bocconi overtook several of the most well-known top global business schools in the Financial Times Executive education ranking, reaching no. 5 in Europe and no. 15 in the world.

Other top universities and polytechnics are the Università Cattolica del Sacro Cuore in Milan, the LUISS in Rome, the Polytechnic University of Turin, the Politecnico di Milano (which in 2011 was ranked as the 48th best technical university in the world by QS World University Rankings), the University of Rome La Sapienza (which in 2005 was ranked Europe's 33rd best university, and in 2013, was instead ranked 62nd in the world and the top in Italy by the Center for World University Rankings), and the University of Milan (whose research and teaching activities have improved over the years and have received important international recognition). This University is the only Italian member of the League of European Research Universities (LERU), a prestigious group of twenty research-intensive European Universities.

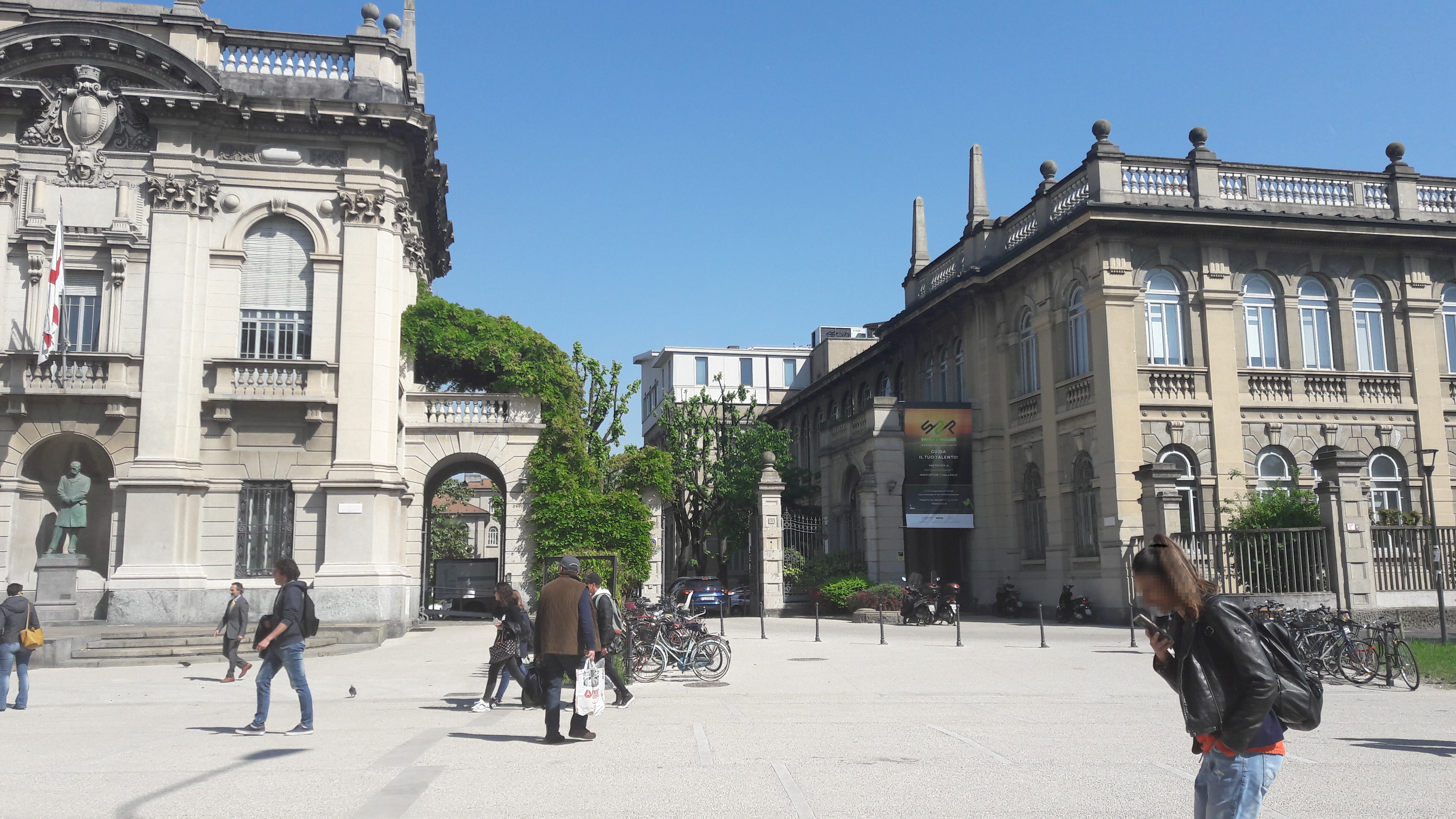
The Polytechnic University of Milan, Lombardy, is the city's oldest university, founded in 1863. It is the best university in Italy.

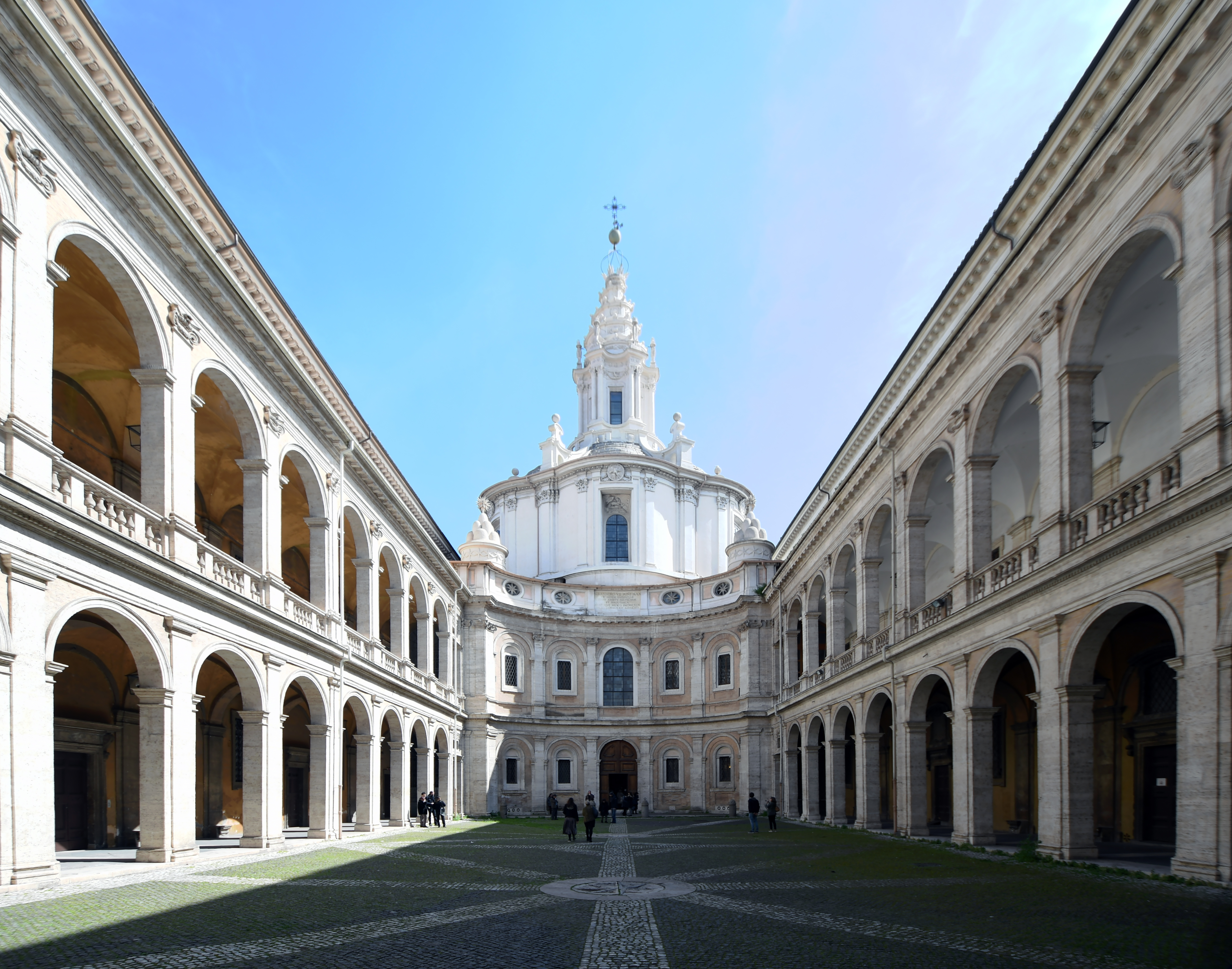
Sapienza University of Rome, Lazio. It was founded in 1303 and is as such one of the world's oldest universities, and with 122,000 students, it is the largest university in Europe.

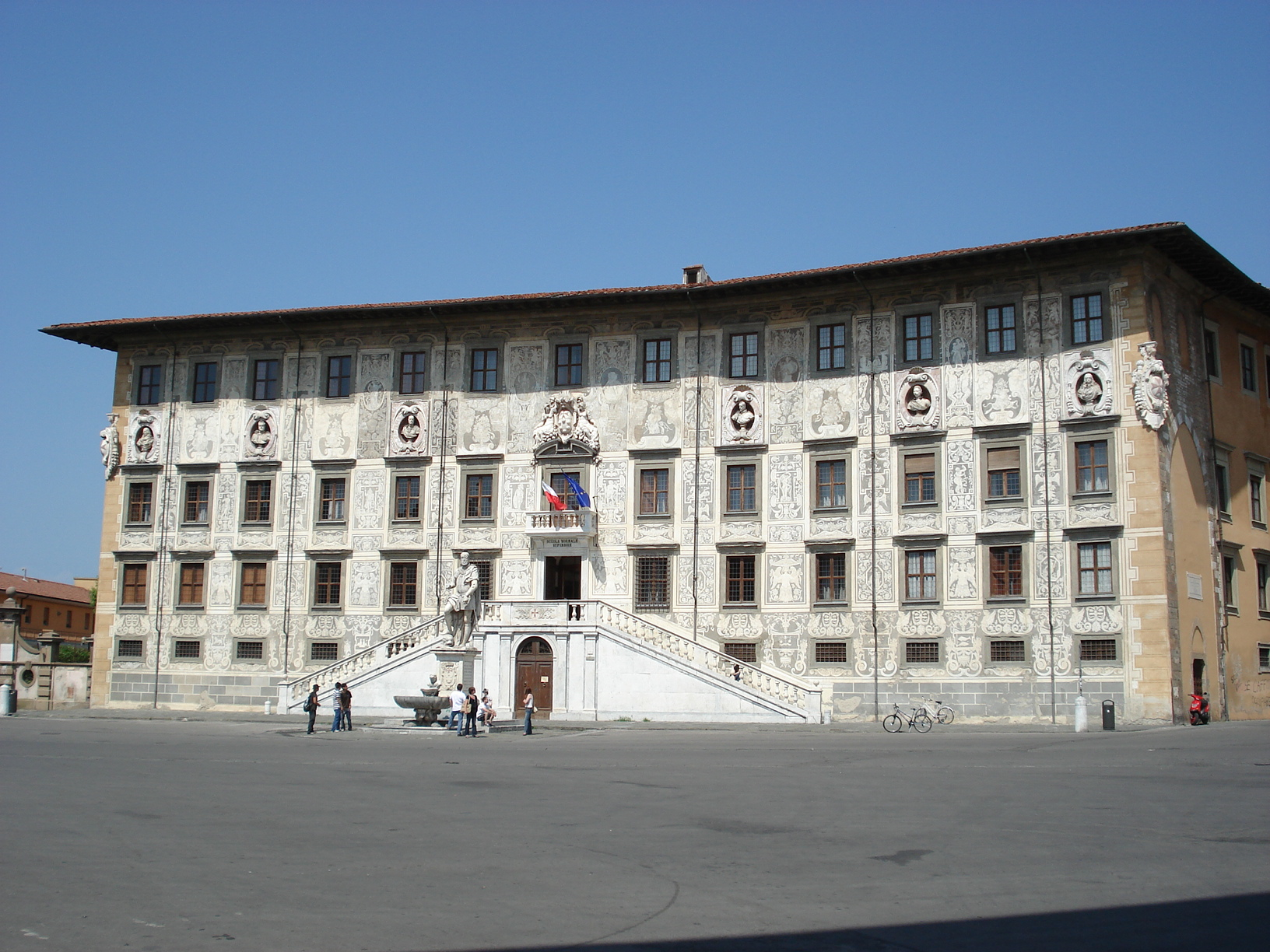
Palazzo della Carovana, Scuola Normale Superiore di Pisa main building, Tuscany. Currently attended by about 600 undergraduate and postgraduate (PhD) students. Together with the University of Pisa and Sant'Anna School of Advanced Studies, it is part of the Pisa University System.

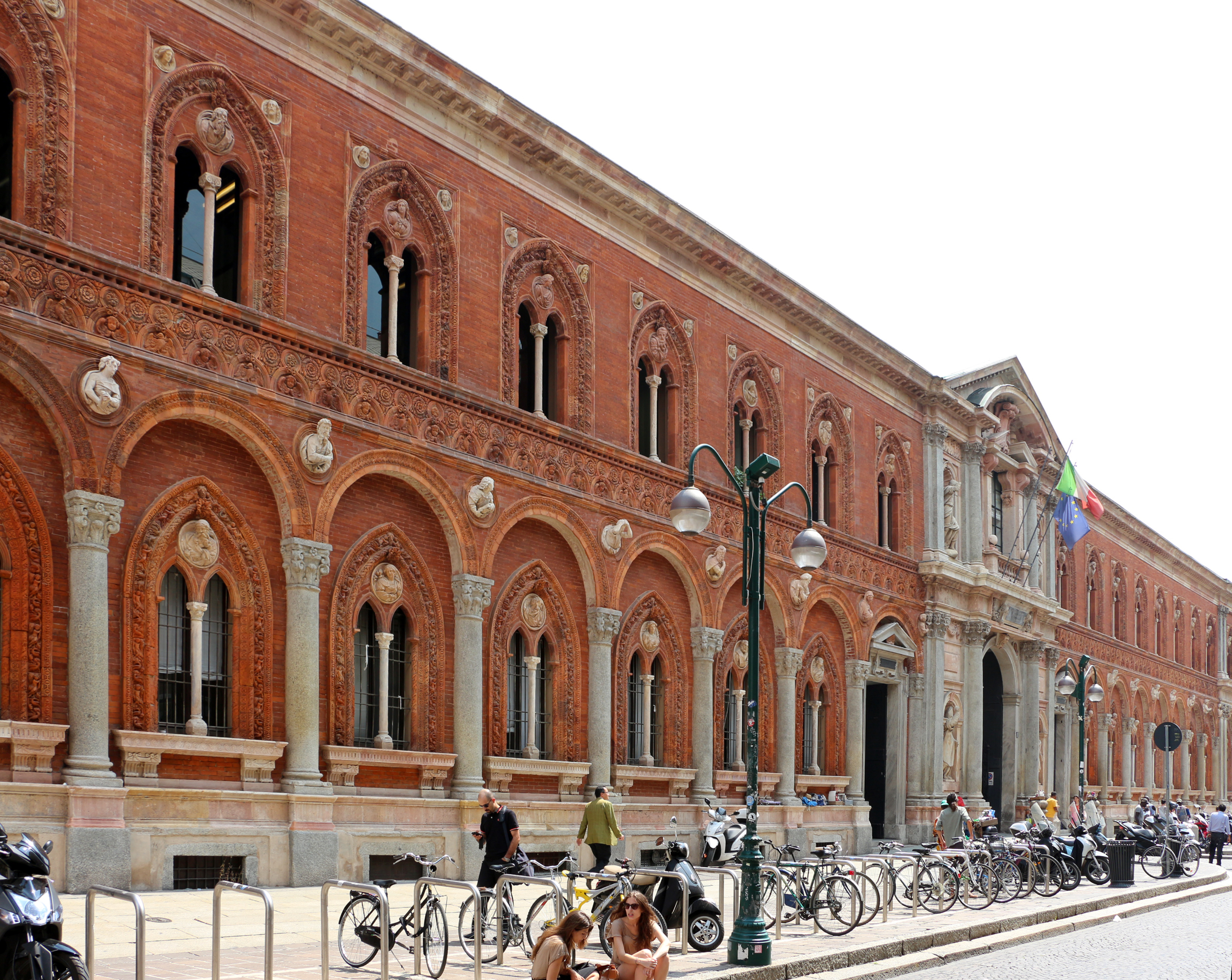
University of Milan, Lombardy. The 15th century Ca' Granda designed by the Renaissance period architect Filarete is the headquarters of the University of Milan

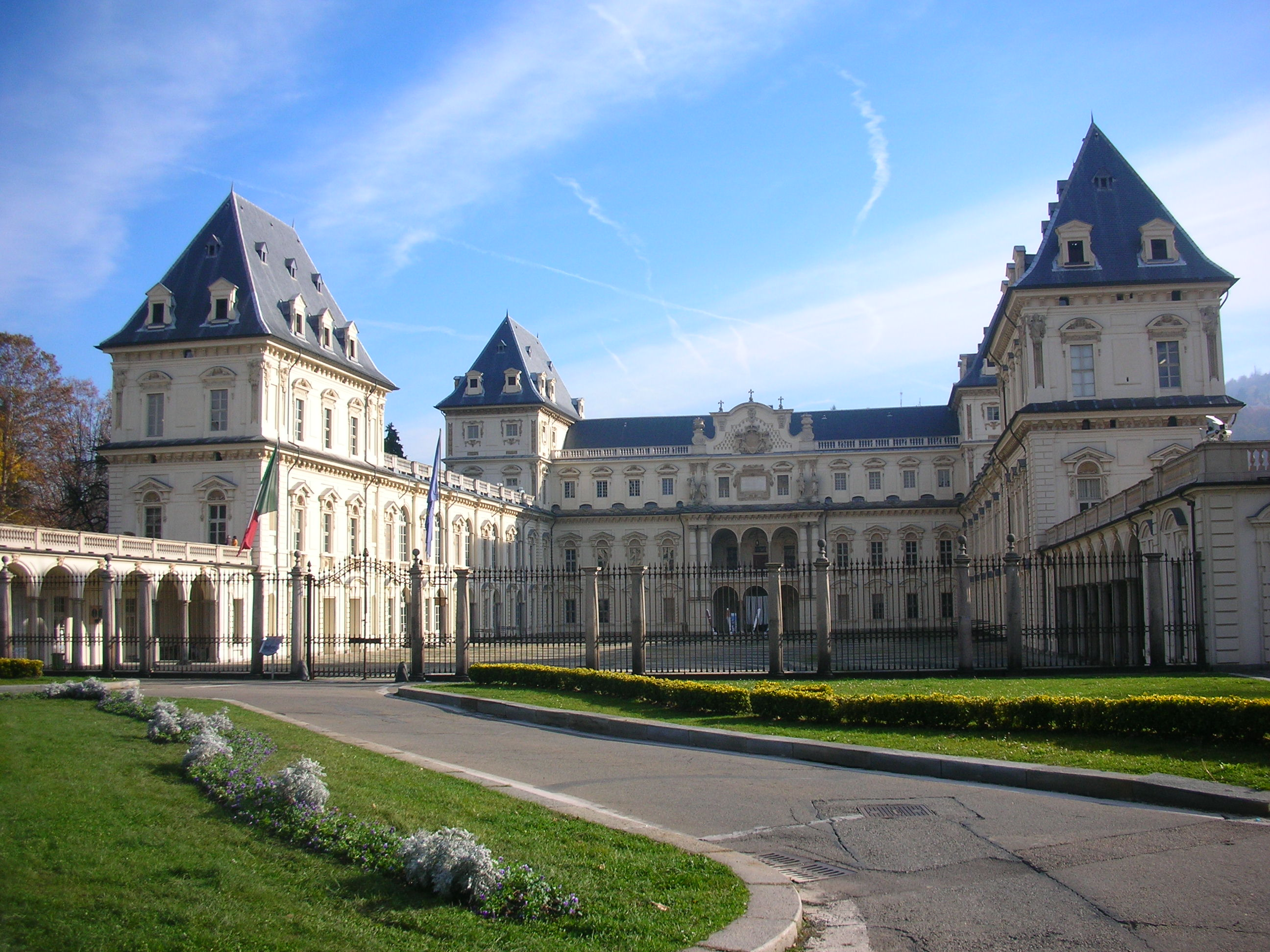
Polytechnic University of Turin, Piedmont. It is ranked (QS World University Rankings) 28th worldwide for Mechanical Engineering, 22nd for Petroleum Engineering, 21st for Architecture and is among the top 100 (52nd) engineering and technology universities in the world.

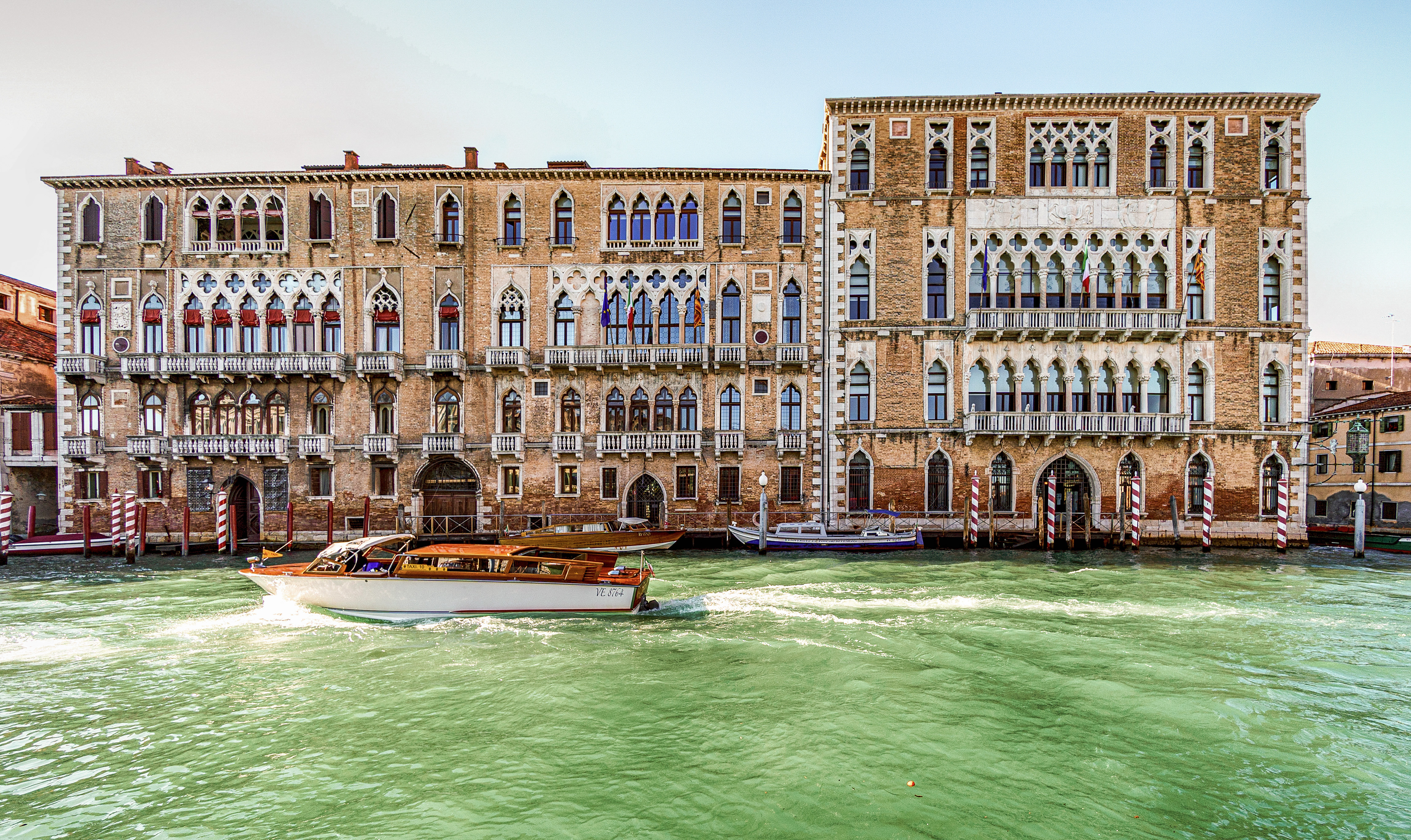
Ca' Foscari University of Venice, Veneto. Its teaching and research is centred around economics & business, humanities, and modern languages.

== Summary ==
Compulsory education is highlighted in yellow.

| level | name | duration | certificate awarded |
|---|---|---|---|
| Pre-school education | Scuola dell'infanzia (nursery school) | 3 years (age: 3 to 6) | |
| Primary education | Scuola primaria (primary school) | 5 years (age: 6 to 11) | Licenza di scuola elementare (until 2004) |
| Lower secondary education | Scuola secondaria di primo grado (first grade secondary school) | 3 years (age: 11 to 14) | Diploma di scuola secondaria di primo grado |
| Upper secondary education | Scuola secondaria di secondo grado (second grade secondary school) | 5 years (age: 14 to 19) (compulsory until the age of 16, or until year 2) | Diploma di liceo Diploma di istituto tecnico Diploma di istituto professionale |
| Upper secondary education | Formazione professionale (vocational education) (until 2010) | 3 or 5 years (age 14 to 17 or 14 to 19) (compulsory until the age of 16, or until year 2) | Qualifica professionale (3 years), Licenza professionale (5 years) |
| Higher education | Laurea (Bachelor's degree); Diploma accademico di primo livello | 3 years | |
| Higher education | Laurea magistrale (Master's degree); Diploma accademico di secondo livello | 2 years | |
| Higher education | Laurea magistrale a ciclo unico (Bachelor's + Master's degree) | 5 years only for: Farmacia (pharmacy); Chimica e tecnologie farmaceutiche (pharmaceutical chemistry); Medicina veterinaria (veterinary medicine); Giurisprudenza (law); Architettura (architecture); Ingegneria edile-Architettura (architectural engineering); Conservazione dei beni culturali (conservation of cultural properties); Scienze della formazione primaria (sciences of primary education), necessary for teaching in nursery or primary schools | |
| Higher education | Laurea magistrale a ciclo unico (Bachelor's + Master's degree) | 6 years, only for: Medicina e chirurgia (medicine and surgery); Odontoiatria e protesi dentaria (dentistry) | |
| Higher education | Dottorato di ricerca (PhD); Diploma accademico di formazione alla ricerca Diploma di Perfezionamento – PhD (Superior Graduate Schools in Italy) | 3, 4 or 5 years | |

== Standards ==
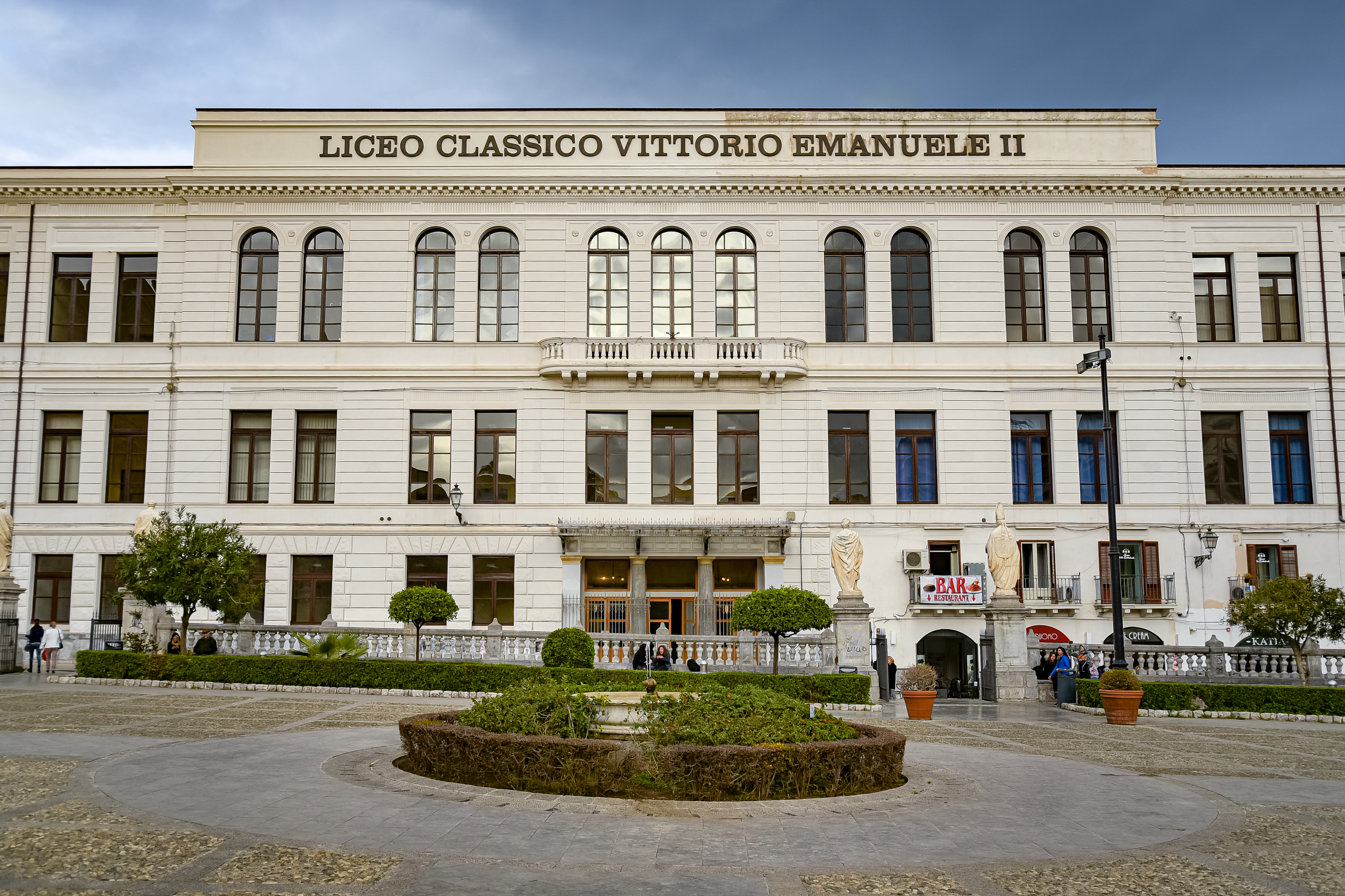
A high school in Palermo, Liceo Classico Vittorio Emanuele II

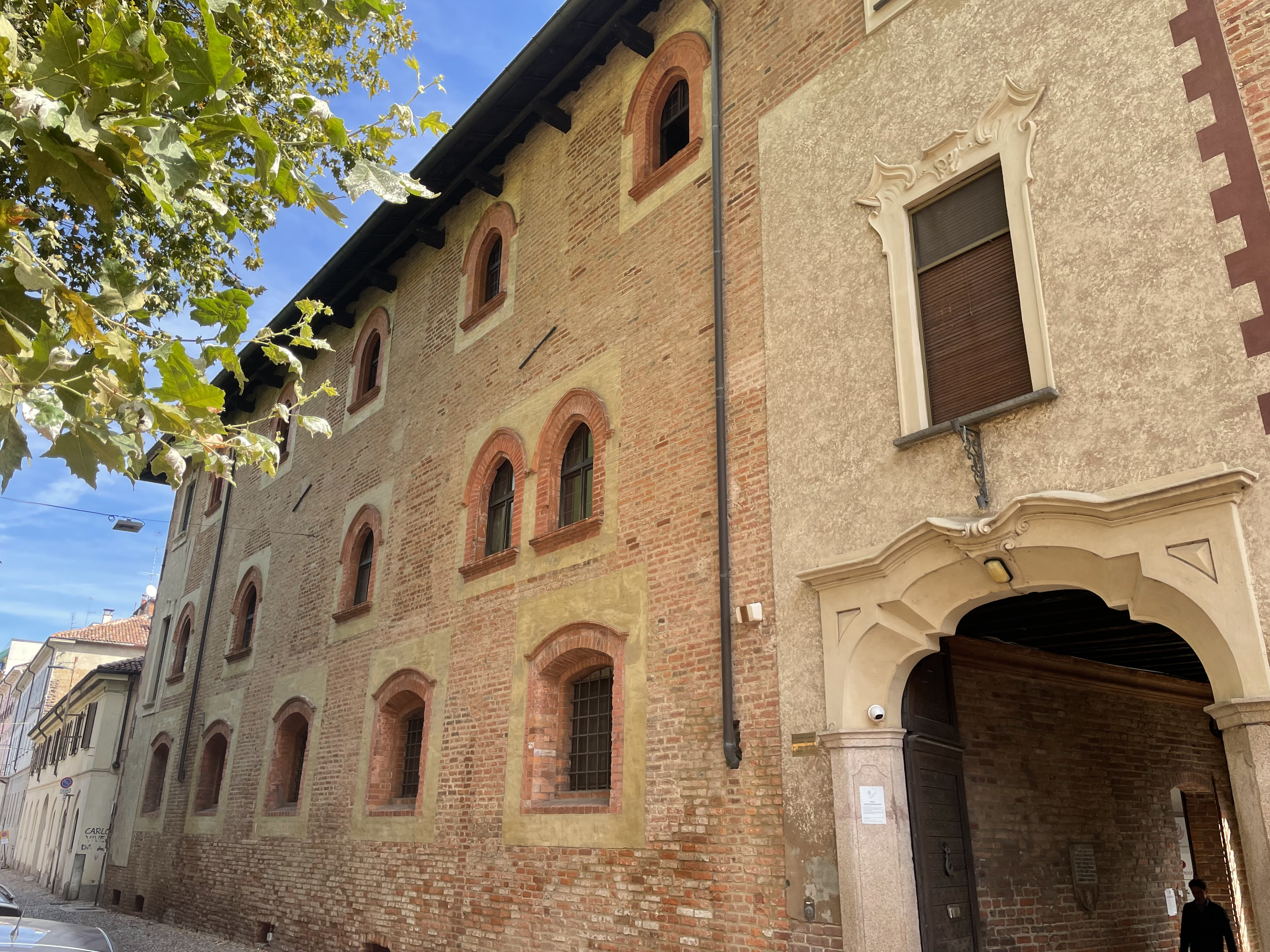
Collegio Castiglioni Brugnatelli, University of Pavia, Lombardy

In 2018, the Italian secondary education was evaluated as below the OECD average. Italy scored below the OECD average in reading and science, and near OECD average in mathematics. Mean performance in Italy declined in reading and science, and remained stable in mathematics. Trento and Bolzano scored at an above the national average in reading. A wide gap exists between northern schools, which perform near average, and schools in the south, that had much poorer results. The 2018 Progress in International Reading Literacy Study ranks children in Italy 16th for reading.

In 2021, 49% of students in Italy were in schools whose principal reported that the school's capacity is hindered by a lack of teaching staff, and 38%, by inadequate or poorly qualified teaching staff, higher than OCED averages.

== Energy use ==
The city of Rome is in charge of a large number of educational structures, around 1,144 nurseries, kindergartens, primary and high schools. These schools are at the moment the most energy-intensive public buildings in the city, accounting for up to 95% of total municipal energy use. Energy efficiency schemes are currently being developed, so that the schools can save money while also lowering carbon emissions. Around 200 schools will be reconstructed, funded by subsidies from the Italian government, European Union money under the PON Metro Italian national plan for metropolitan areas, and a €150 million credit line authorised by the European Investment Bank in February 2023.

== See also ==
- Secondary education in Italy
- Higher education in Italy
- List of schools in Italy
- Open access in Italy
