= Sarpy =

Sarpy may refer to:

== Places ==
- New Sarpy, Louisiana
- Sarpy County, Nebraska

== People ==
- Peter A. Sarpy (1804–1865), American pioneer businessman

== See also ==
- Sarpi (disambiguation)
