= Liceo Classico Paolo Sarpi =

- Una scuola nella storia d'Italia. Il Liceo 'Sarpi' 1803–2003

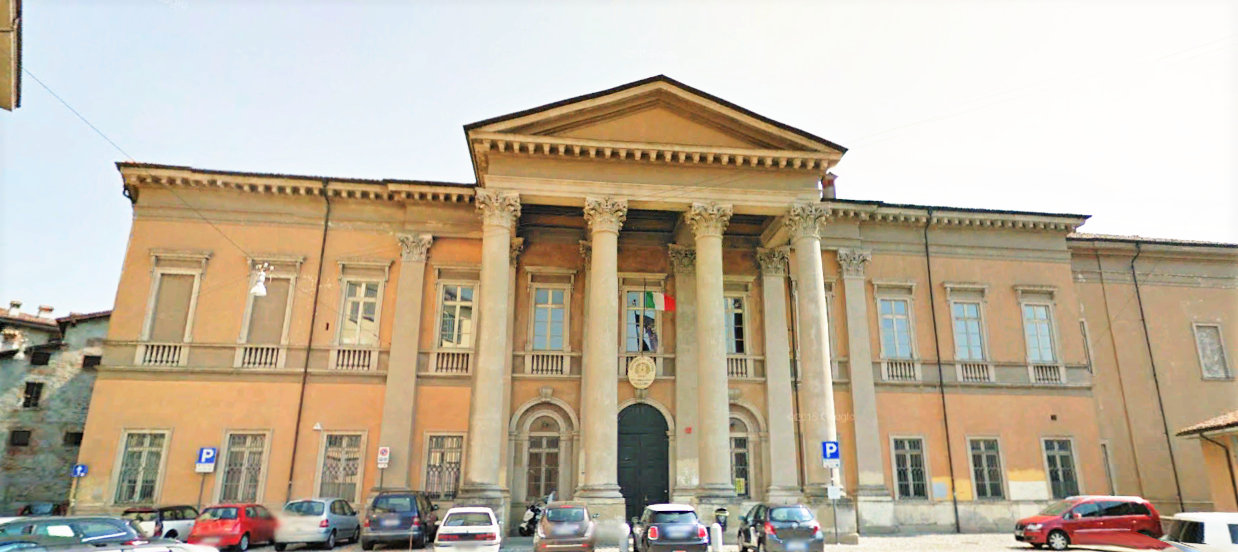

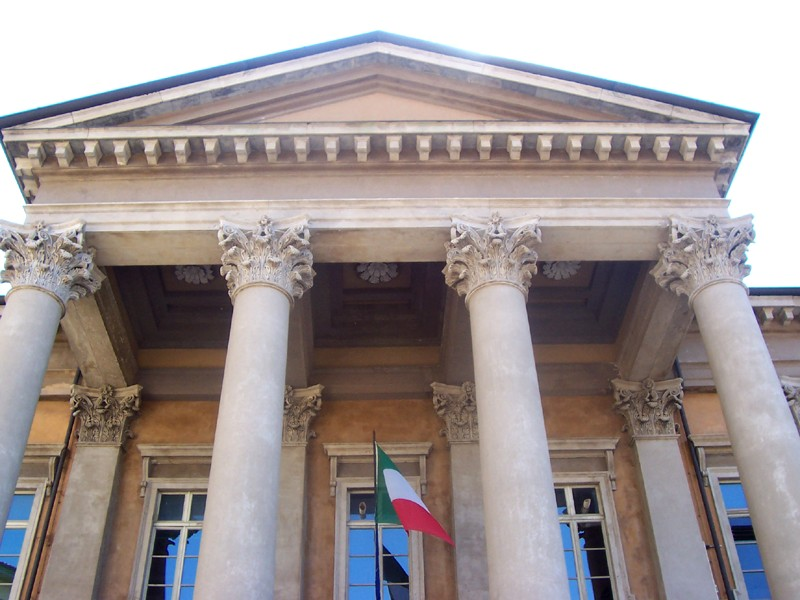
- The neoclassical façade of Sarpi palace, commissioned by the Austrian Government and designed by Ferdinando Crivelli in 1842.

Location
- Piazza Rosate, 4 Upper City of Bergamo; Lombardy; Bergamo, 24125; Italy
- Coordinates: Bergamo 45°42′08″N 9°39′44″E

Information
- School type: Public
- Motto: Una scuola nella storia d'Italia. Sarpi 1803-2003 (Italian) (A school in the History of Italy)
- Denomination: Liceo Classico Statale Paolo Sarpi
- Established: 1506
- Category: Liceo classico
- Grades: 5
- Enrollment: 100-120 yearly
- Education system: Ministry of Education, Universities and Research (Italy)
- Language: Italian
- National ranking: 2nd
- Website: http://www.liceosarpi.bg.it/

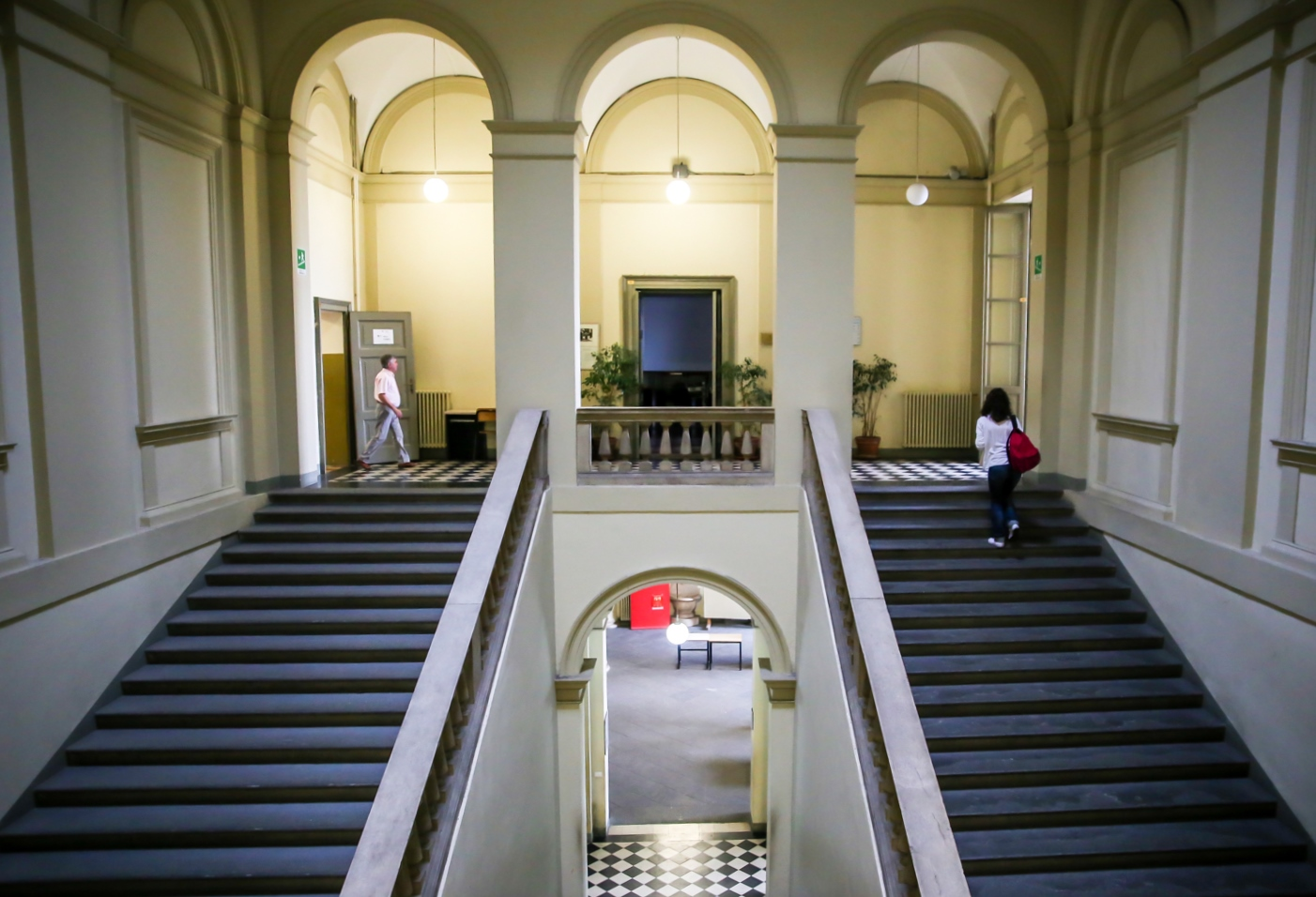
The staircase leading to the first floor of the building

Liceo Classico Paolo Sarpi is a prominent public high school in Bergamo, Lombardy, northern Italy, (ranked 2nd nationally by Eduscopio in 2016 and 2017) because of the methodology combining Ancient Greek language and culture, Latin language and culture, Scientific studies with Philosophy and History. Every year, some 100 students graduate from Sarpi, that is one of Italy's oldest humanistic, scientific and social high schools. Established in 1506 under the name of Accademia della Misericordia, the academy is named after Venetian polymath Paolo Sarpi since 1803.

== The documentary-film Gli anni e i giorni (2012) ==
Fifth-year Sarpi students share their last high school year in a documentary-film about the liceo classico and the Italian education system. While preparing for the Esame di Stato, students live the delicate moment of transition to adulthood and they seek to reconcile the uncertainties with the expectations about their future.

== Excellence at Sarpi: the 2015 National Report ==
Sarpi is considered an elitist high school and a selective, harsh and competitive environment with the enrolment decreasing by 40% between 2015 and 2016. A 2015 report of the Italian Ministry of Education highlights that drop-outs and failures at Sarpi are too frequent and must be reduced significantly. To favour gifted students, 25% of students were not admitted to the next grade and 29.5% were conditionally allowed to advance to the next grade, only after re-taking failed exams over the summer (Italian average being 11,5%) in the year before Esame di Stato. Students tend to enrol in other high schools, because of the higher chances to succeed. The school's policies too rarely allow teachers to assess students with top grades: bright pupils are rarely graded 9 and 10 out of 10 but more often middle band grades 7 and 8 (with 6 out of 10 being the passing grade). This grading policy disfavours Sarpi scholars as compared to students of other Italian high schools, where teachers abide by the national grading system, ranging from 3 to 10. In 2016, the average grade at Sarpi was 6.98 out of 10 and 1% of Sarpi students had a GPA higher or equal than 9. Although data show that grades awarded at Sarpi stand below the Italian average, the report highlights Sarpi students excellence. At the 2014 Ministerial National tests of Humanities and Scientific studies, the Institute performed far above Italian schools' average and Sarpi pupils were asked to re-take the tests, because results exceeded the expectations as compared to the National situation (INVALSI National tests 2014). On the other hand, students in South Italy, who are less prepared but tend to get better grades as compared to Northern Italy, finished last in the National tests. This phenomenon is also known as Italy's North-South divide in school grading standards, and it was described in the Italian Journal of Sociology of Education in 2015.

In 2016, no scholars at Sarpi graduated with honours. On the contrary, Southern Italy holds the record of students graduated with honours: 944 in Apulia, 802 in Campania and 516 in Sicily. About the competences, the report confirms that "the curriculum of this school does not address the world of work, rather it is meant to educate the future ruling class. Apprenticeships involving all students should be nonetheless implemented".

== History and contribution to the Italian unification ==
The first public school of Grammar, Humanities, and Rhetorics was established by the Republic of Venice in 1506 under the name of Accademia della Misericordia. The modern school was established by Napoleonic decree in 1803, while the villa on the Rosate hill was erected between 1845 and 1852 under the auspices of the Austrian Government as "Regio Liceo". In 1860, the academy contributed to the Italian Unification with seventy students out of 170 Bergamasque Hunters of the Alps taking part in Garibaldi's Expedition of the Thousand, aimed at invading the Kingdom of the Two Sicilies and annexing its territory to the incipient Kingdom of Italy in 1861. In 2011, the academy took part in the celebration of the 150° anniversary of the Italian unification: for the occasion, the President of the Republic, Giorgio Napolitano, visited Bergamo, a town that Garibaldi hailed as La Città dei Mille, because of the major role the Alpine city played in the Expedition of the Thousand.

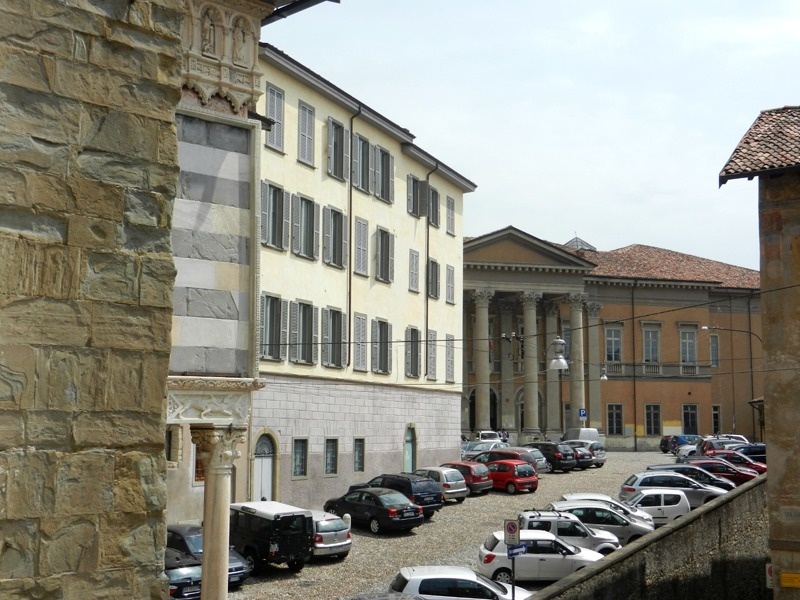
Sarpi seen from Piazza Rosate and Cathedral

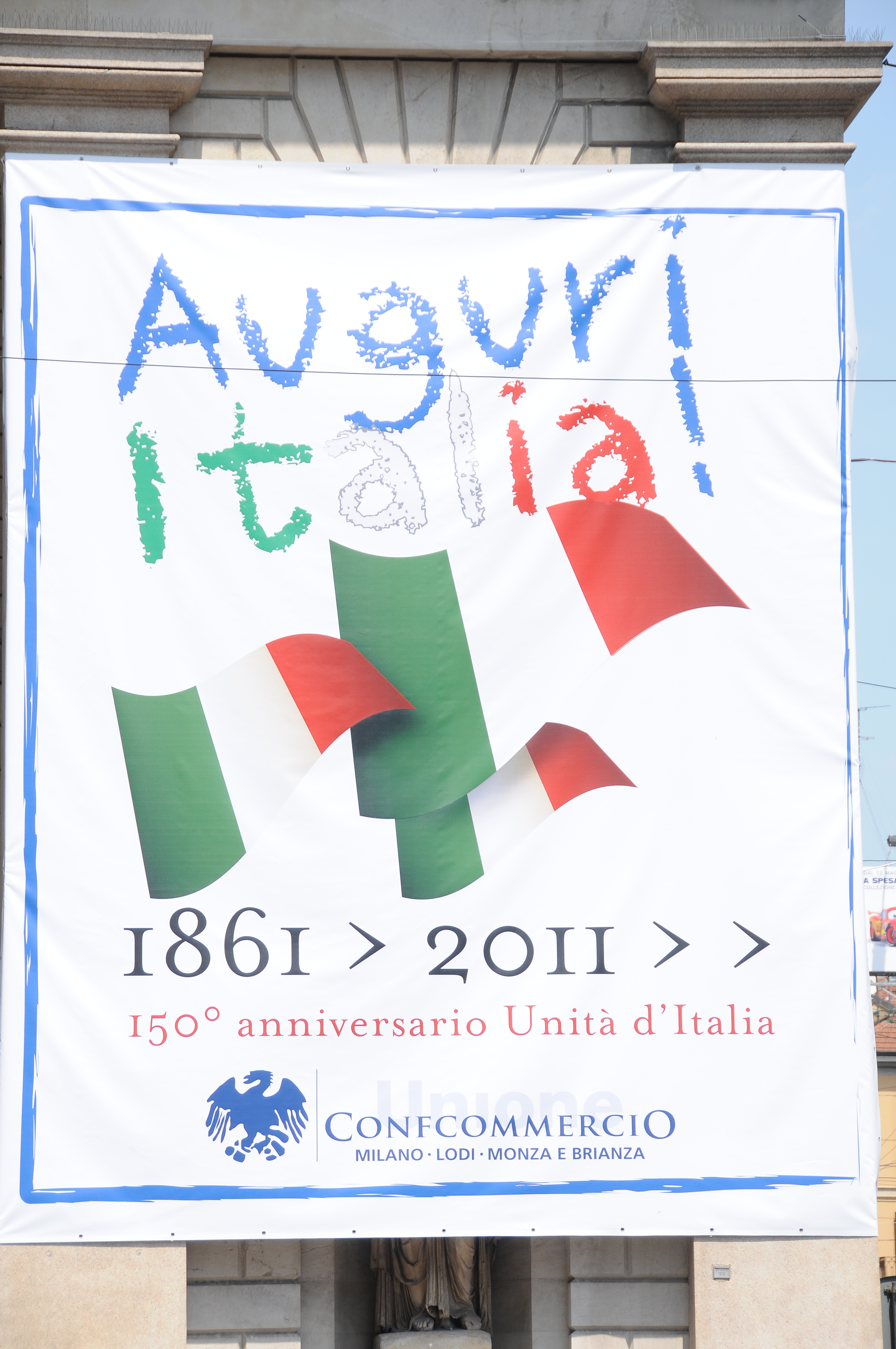
Celebrations for the 150° anniversary of the Italian unification in 2011.

Recently, the school adopted the following modernization reforms:

- in 1989 the Liceo adopted the continuation of foreign language learning in the triennium;
- in 1990 the Liceo adhered to the National Plan for Computer Sciences Learning;
- in 1996 it approved the experimentation of cultural heritage studies and history of art;
- the Hermes project (1998) was an experiment of autonomous pedagogy, to find new ways to develop recovery activities.
- Since 2014, the school has opened its cabinet of Physics, Biology, Arts and History, with Italy's second most ancient collection of scientific instruments dating back to 17th century.

== Sport ==
In 1907, the Società Bergamasca di Ginnastica e Sports Atletici Atalanta was instituted in the gym of the academy by some Swiss students. It was renamed Atalanta B.C. after the mythological Greek athlete Atalanta in 1914 and competed for the first time in UEFA Champions League in the 2019–2020 season.

== The palace as a filming location ==
The palace and the surrounding areas have been used as setting of several movies:

- Call Me by Your Name (by Luca Guadagnino, 2017; screenplay by James Ivory). Piazza Rosate and the courtyard of Sarpi were filming locations of the 2017 romantic-drama film, which was awarded the Oscar for the Best Adapted Screenplay in 2018. Among the other historical buildings, Bergamo Cathedral, Santa Maria Maggiore, and the University of Sciences, Letters and Arts were also used.
- Una grande famiglia (The Family, 2012–2015, by Riccardo Milani for Rai 1, flagship television channel of Italy's public broadcasting company Rai).
- Gli Anni e i Giorni (by Beppe Manzi, 2012).

== School subjects and plan of study ==
In 2010, the Gelmini reform changed the traditional Italian school system, so now students follow this specific pattern of courses that covers a large range of disciplines. Sarpi offers (together with this programme of studies) courses in music theory and history of music or an in-depth course in science or maths, for one or two hours a week every year. Upon the completion of the studies, students must pass the Esame di Stato (until 1999 denominated Esame di maturità) to obtain their diploma di maturità.

Subjects	Gymnasium		Lyceum		
Subjects	I year	II year	III year	IV year	V year
Italian language and literature	4	4	4	4	4
Latin language, literature, civilization	5	5	4	4	4
Ancient Greek language, literature, civilization	4	4	3	3	3
English	3	3	3	3	3
History and geography	3	3	-	-	-
History	-	-	3	3	3
Philosophy	-	-	3	3	3
Mathematics*	3	3	2	2	2
Physics	-	-	2	2	2
Natural sciences ( Biology, Chemistry, Astronomy, Geology, Earth Science)	2	2	2	2	2
History of art	-	-	2	2	2
Physical education	2	2	2	2	2
Catholic religion instruction or other activities	1	1	1	1	1
Weekly lesson hours	27	27	31	31	31

- *with computer lab at first biennial

Second Foreign Language and History of Music (optional). Speciality of Maths offered as well during the final three years of Liceo.

== Notable alumni (partial) ==
- Giulio Terzi di Sant'Agata, Italian Minister of Foreign Affairs, Italy's ambassador to the United States, Permanent representative of Italy to the United Nations, where he led the Italian delegation to the United Nations Security Council.
- Filippo Maria Pandolfi, European commissioner for Research, Innovation and Science. Minister of Agriculture, European Commissioner for Digital Economy and Society, Minister of the Industry, twice Minister of Treasury.
- Roberto Calderoli, vice president of the Italian Senate of the Republic.
- Vittorio Feltri, Italian journalist, editor of Libero.
- Bortolo Belotti, Italian politician, historian and jurist, Minister for Industry and Commerce.
- Mirko Tremaglia, Italian politician and Minister for the Italians living abroad.
- Giorgio Gori, entrepreneur, mayor of Bergamo and exponent of Democratic Party.

== Pictures ==
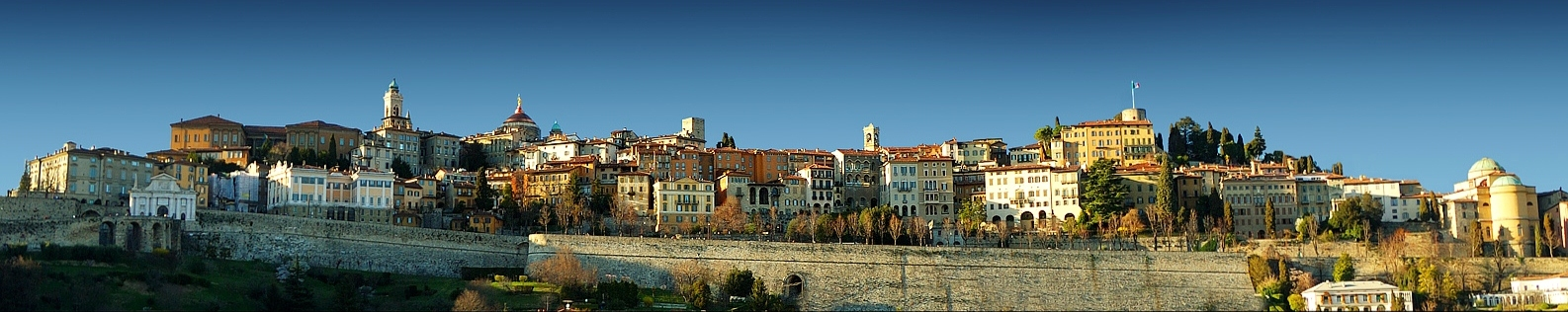
The skyline of the Upper City of Bergamo. The Liceo Classico Paolo Sarpi palace is on the left of the picture.

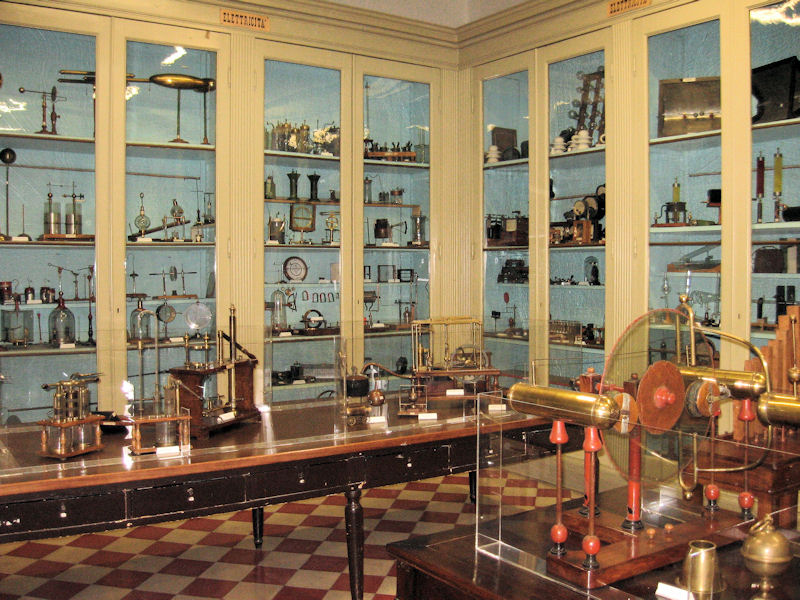
Physics Laboratory

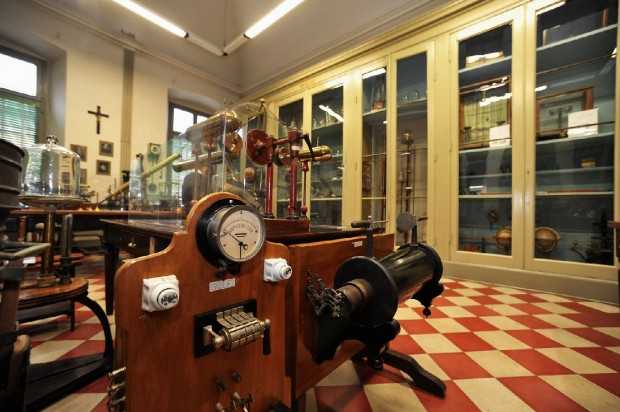
Physics Laboratory

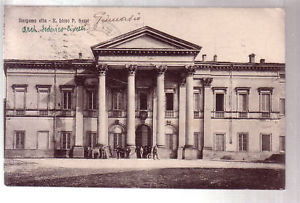
The building in 1924

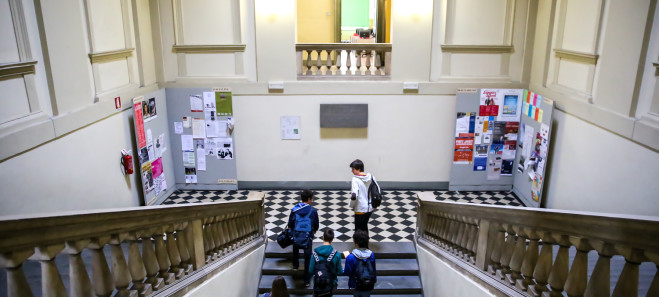
The staircase leading to the first floor
