= 1998–99 Serie B =

Italian football league season

Serie B
- Season: 1998–99
- Promoted: Verona (3rd title); Torino; Lecce; Reggina
- Relegated: Reggiana; Fidelis Andria; Lucchese; Cremonese
- Matches: 380
- Goals: 865 (2.28 per match)
- Top goalscorer: (Italy) Marco Ferrante (26 goals)

Serie B 1998-99 team distribution

The Serie B 1998–99 was the sixty-seventh tournament of this competition played in Italy since its creation.

== Teams ==
Cesena, Cremonese, Cosenza and Ternana had been promoted from Serie C, while Brescia, Atalanta, Lecce and Napoli had been relegated from Serie A.

=== Personnel and sponsoring ===
Team	Manager	Kit manufacturer	Shirt sponsor
Atalanta	(Italy) Bortolo Mutti	Asics	Somet
Brescia	(Italy) Silvio Baldini	Garman	Ristora
Cesena	(Italy) Alberto Cavasin	Adidas	Orogel
Chievo Verona	(Italy) Lorenzo Balestro & (Italy) Luciano Miani	Biemme	Paluani
Cosenza	(Italy) Giuliano Sonzogni	Kappa	Provincia di Cosenza
Cremonese	(Italy) Gaetano Salvemini	Puma	Bossini Docce
Fidelis Andria	(Italy) Giorgio Rumignani	Biemme	Banca Popolare Andriese/Gruppo Ferri
Genoa	(Italy) Luigi Cagni	Kappa	Festival Crociere
Hellas Verona	(Italy) Cesare Prandelli	Erreà	Atreyu Immobiliare
Lecce	(Italy) Nedo Sonetti	Asics	Banca del Salento
Lucchese	(Italy) Tarcisio Burgnich	Erreà	Cremlat
Monza	(Italy) Pierluigi Frosio	Adidas	Vismara Salumi
Napoli	(Italy) Vincenzo Montefusco	Nike	Polenghi Lombardo
Pescara	(Italy) Luigi De Canio	Puma	Gelati Gis
Ravenna	(Italy) Sergio Santarini	Erreà	Valleverde Calzature
Reggiana	(Italy) Angelo Gregucci & (Italy) Fabiano Speggiorin	Erreà	Latte Giglio
Reggina	(Italy) Bruno Bolchi	Asics	Caffè Mauro
Ternana	(Italy) Vincenzo Guerini	Ennedue	TAD Metals Ambiente
Torino	(Italy) Emiliano Mondonico	Kelme	SDA Express Courier
Treviso	(Italy) Gianfranco Bellotto	Lotto	Segafredo

== Final classification ==
Pos	Team	Pld	W	D	L	GF	GA	GD	Pts	Promotion or relegation
1	Hellas Verona (P, C)	38	18	12	8	60	38	+22	66	Promotion to Serie A
2	Torino (P)	38	19	8	11	58	36	+22	65	Promotion to Serie A
3	Lecce (P)	38	18	10	10	47	39	+8	64	Promotion to Serie A
4	Reggina (P)	38	16	16	6	45	32	+13	64	Promotion to Serie A
5	Pescara	38	18	9	11	50	42	+8	63	
6	Atalanta	38	14	19	5	44	27	+17	61	
7	Brescia	38	14	14	10	44	33	+11	56	
8	Treviso	38	14	14	10	52	42	+10	56	
9	Ravenna	38	13	12	13	47	51	−4	51	
10	Napoli	38	12	15	11	41	38	+3	51	
11	Chievo	38	11	15	12	37	40	−3	48	
12	Genoa	38	10	16	12	53	53	0	46	
13	Cesena	38	10	15	13	37	41	−4	45	
14	Ternana	38	10	15	13	39	50	−11	45	
15	Monza	38	10	15	13	32	38	−6	45	
16	Cosenza	38	11	10	17	41	53	−12	43	
17	Reggiana (R)	38	9	14	15	40	49	−9	41	Relegation to Serie C1
18	Fidelis Andria (R)	38	9	13	16	33	49	−16	40	Relegation to Serie C1
19	Lucchese (R)	38	8	13	17	35	45	−10	37	Relegation to Serie C1
20	Cremonese (R)	38	3	11	24	30	69	−39	20	Relegation to Serie C1

Source: Almanacco Illustrato del Calcio - La Storia 1898-2004, Panini Edizioni, Modena, September 2005
Rules for classification: 1) points; 2) head-to-head points; 3) head-to-head goal difference; 4) head-to-head goals scored; 5) goal difference; 6) number of goals scored.
(C) Champions; (P) Promoted; (R) Relegated

== Results ==
Home \ Away	ATA	BRE	CES	CHV	COS	CRE	FAN	GEN	LCE	LUC	MON	NAP	PES	RAV	REA	REG	TER	TOR	TRV	HEL
Atalanta	—	1–1	0–0	1–1	3–0	3–0	0–0	1–0	2–1	1–0	2–0	1–1	4–0	1–1	0–0	2–1	1–0	1–0	2–2	3–2
Brescia	1–1	—	3–0	0–1	0–0	1–0	0–0	3–1	0–0	2–1	2–2	0–0	3–0	3–0	0–1	2–3	2–0	2–1	2–1	0–2
Cesena	0–0	1–0	—	0–0	3–0	1–1	1–1	2–2	3–1	1–0	0–1	0–0	1–1	4–2	2–0	0–2	2–1	0–1	2–3	2–0
Chievo	2–0	0–2	0–0	—	0–3	2–0	1–2	1–1	1–2	1–4	3–2	0–2	0–2	1–1	0–0	3–0	1–0	0–2	4–2	2–0
Cosenza	2–2	1–1	2–1	2–1	—	2–0	2–0	2–2	1–1	0–0	2–3	1–0	1–5	3–1	2–0	1–2	1–1	1–2	1–0	0–1
Cremonese	1–3	1–2	3–1	0–1	0–3	—	2–1	1–1	0–2	1–2	1–1	1–1	0–3	0–2	2–2	0–2	1–1	3–2	1–1	0–0
Fidelis Andria	0–1	1–1	1–1	0–1	1–0	1–0	—	1–1	0–0	1–0	0–0	2–1	2–2	3–2	2–3	0–1	2–0	1–4	1–3	1–1
Genoa	2–1	1–1	4–1	3–3	0–0	4–1	0–0	—	0–1	1–1	2–1	1–1	3–2	1–3	1–1	1–1	6–1	1–0	1–0	3–3
Lecce	0–0	2–0	2–1	2–2	2–0	2–1	1–0	3–1	—	1–0	0–1	3–1	0–1	1–0	1–0	1–0	3–2	1–1	0–1	0–2
Lucchese	2–2	0–0	0–0	1–1	0–0	2–1	1–2	1–0	2–2	—	1–2	3–2	2–0	0–1	2–0	0–0	1–1	0–1	2–1	1–2
Monza	1–2	0–0	0–1	0–0	3–0	0–0	1–0	0–2	1–1	0–0	—	0–1	0–2	1–0	1–0	1–1	1–1	0–2	0–0	1–0
Napoli	0–0	2–0	1–0	0–0	1–2	2–1	1–1	2–1	2–2	2–1	1–2	—	2–0	2–4	2–0	1–1	1–0	0–0	1–1	0–0
Pescara	1–0	3–2	0–0	1–1	1–0	1–0	2–1	4–1	0–0	0–0	1–0	0–1	—	1–0	1–0	0–2	5–1	2–1	0–1	1–1
Ravenna	0–0	1–1	2–1	0–0	2–1	2–0	3–0	2–1	1–2	3–0	0–0	1–1	1–1	—	1–0	1–1	0–2	1–0	3–2	2–3
Reggiana	0–0	1–2	1–1	1–1	3–2	1–1	3–0	1–3	2–1	3–2	1–1	0–1	0–2	3–0	—	1–1	1–1	1–1	2–1	1–1
Reggina	0–0	0–0	3–1	1–0	2–1	0–0	1–1	0–0	1–3	2–1	0–0	2–1	3–0	1–1	3–0	—	1–1	1–0	1–0	0–0
Ternana	1–1	1–2	1–1	0–2	2–0	1–0	2–1	0–0	0–1	1–0	2–1	2–1	2–2	2–2	0–0	0–0	—	2–1	3–2	2–0
Torino	2–1	2–1	1–2	2–0	1–0	5–3	2–0	3–0	3–1	2–1	3–3	3–2	1–2	3–0	2–0	1–2	0–0	—	0–0	3–1
Treviso	1–1	1–0	0–0	1–0	5–1	3–1	1–3	2–0	1–0	1–1	3–1	1–1	1–0	1–1	3–2	4–2	1–1	0–0	—	0–0
Hellas Verona	1–0	0–2	1–0	0–0	1–1	5–2	3–0	2–1	5–1	4–0	1–0	1–0	4–1	4–0	2–5	3–1	3–1	0–0	1–1	—

Source: Almanacco Illustrato del Calcio - La Storia 1898-2004, Panini Edizioni, Modena, September 2005
Legend: Blue = home team win; Yellow = draw; Red = away team win.

== Attendances ==
#	Club	Average
1	Napoli	26,149
2	Torino	19,687
3	Atalanta	13,694
4	Genoa	12,961
5	Verona	11,376
6	Ternana	10,123
7	Lecce	9,733
8	Reggina	8,909
9	Brescia	7,346
10	Pescara	6,524
11	Cesena	6,421
12	Cosenza	5,810
13	Reggiana	4,922
14	Treviso	4,589
15	Lucchese	4,088
16	Ravenna	4,038
17	Chievo	3,264
18	Fidelis Andria	3,043
19	Monza	2,662
20	Cremonese	2,525
