= 1999–2000 Serie B =

Italian football league season

Serie B
- Season: 1999–00
- Promoted: Vicenza (3rd title); Atalanta; Brescia; Napoli
- Relegated: Cesena; Alzano Virescit; Savoia; Fermana
- Matches: 380
- Goals: 952 (2.51 per match)
- Top goalscorer: (Italy) Cosimo Francioso (24 goals)

Serie B 1999–2000 team distribution

The Serie B 1999–00 was the sixty-eighth tournament of this competition played in Italy since its creation.

== Teams ==
Alzano, Fermana, Pistoiese and Savoia had been promoted from Serie C, while Salernitana, Sampdoria, Vicenza and Empoli had been relegated from Serie A.

=== Personnel and sponsoring ===
Team	Manager	Kit manufacturer	Shirt sponsor
Alzano Virescit	(Italy) Claudio Foscarini	Virma	Valtellina SpA
Atalanta	(Italy) Giovanni Vavassori	Asics	Somet
Brescia	(Italy) Nedo Sonetti	Garman	Ristora
Cesena	(Italy) Paolo Ammoniaci	Adidas	CAMAC Industria Moda
Chievo Verona	(Italy) Lorenzo Balestro & (Italy) Luciano Miani	Hummel	Paluani
Cosenza	(Italy) Bortolo Mutti	Kappa	Provincia di Cosenza
Empoli	(Italy) Silvio Baldini	Erreà	Sammontana
Fermana	(Italy) Ivo Iaconi	Fatto per fare	Teseo SpA
Genoa	(Italy) Bruno Bolchi	Kappa	Festival Crociere
Monza	(Italy) Roberto Antonelli	Legea	Vismara Salumi
Napoli	(Italy) Walter Novellino	Nike	Peroni
Pescara	(Italy) Giovanni Galeone	Puma	Gelati Gis
Pistoiese	(Italy) Andrea Agostinelli	Erreà	Vannucci Piante
Ravenna	(Italy) Attilio Perotti	Erreà	Valleverde Calzature
Salernitana	(Italy) Luigi Cagni	Asics	Exigo Jeans
Sampdoria	(Italy) Gian Piero Ventura	Asics	Dreamcast
Savoia	(Italy) Gaetano Manzi & (Italy) Franco Mango	Hummel	Challoils
Ternana	(Italy) Tarcisio Burgnich	Ennedue	TAD Metals Ambiente
Treviso	(Italy) Gianfranco Bellotto	Lotto	Segafredo
Vicenza	(Italy) Edoardo Reja	Umbro	Caffè Vero

== Final classification ==
Pos	Team	Pld	W	D	L	GF	GA	GD	Pts	Promotion or relegation
1	Vicenza (P, C)	38	20	7	11	69	45	+24	67	Promotion to Serie A
2	Napoli (P)	38	17	12	9	55	44	+11	63	Promotion to Serie A
3	Atalanta (P)	38	17	12	9	51	34	+17	63	Promotion to Serie A
4	Brescia (P)	38	16	15	7	54	38	+16	63	Promotion to Serie A
5	Sampdoria	38	17	11	10	45	40	+5	62	
6	Genoa	38	16	9	13	51	42	+9	57	
7	Salernitana	38	14	10	14	55	61	−6	52	
8	Empoli	38	13	12	13	42	52	−10	51	
9	Treviso	38	13	12	13	56	48	+8	51	
10	Ternana	38	11	16	11	45	47	−2	49	
11	Ravenna	38	11	15	12	41	39	+2	48	
12	Cosenza	38	11	15	12	36	41	−5	48	
13	Pescara	38	10	17	11	62	55	+7	47	
14	Monza	38	9	20	9	45	46	−1	47	
15	Chievo	38	11	14	13	48	53	−5	47	
16	Pistoiese (Note: 4 points deducted)	38	13	10	15	39	43	−4	45	Relegation tie-breaker
17	Cesena (R)	38	8	21	9	47	45	+2	45	Serie C1 after tie-breaker
18	Alzano Virescit (R)	38	10	12	16	39	51	−12	42	Relegation to Serie C1
19	Savoia (R)	38	6	11	21	36	62	−26	29	Relegation to Serie C1
20	Fermana (R)	38	6	11	21	36	66	−30	29	Relegation to Serie C1

Source: Almanacco Illustrato del Calcio - La Storia 1898-2004, Panini Edizioni, Modena, September 2005
Rules for classification: 1) points; 2) head-to-head points; 3) head-to-head goal difference; 4) head-to-head goals scored; 5) goal difference; 6) number of goals scored.
(C) Champions; (P) Promoted; (R) Relegated

== Results ==
Home \ Away	ALZ	ATA	BRE	CES	CHV	COS	EMP	FER	GEN	MON	NAP	PES	PST	RAV	SAL	SAM	SAV	TER	TRV	VIC
Alzano Virescit	—	0–0	0–1	0–0	2–1	0–0	2–1	2–2	3–1	2–1	0–4	4–2	1–2	2–1	3–2	0–1	2–1	1–0	2–2	1–3
Atalanta	1–0	—	1–1	1–1	0–1	1–1	1–1	4–0	1–0	3–1	1–0	3–1	3–1	1–0	2–0	3–3	4–1	1–2	3–2	1–0
Brescia	2–0	0–0	—	1–1	3–1	0–1	1–0	0–0	0–1	1–0	3–1	5–1	2–0	2–1	4–1	0–1	1–1	3–0	2–1	1–1
Cesena	1–1	1–1	2–2	—	0–0	3–3	2–1	1–0	1–0	3–3	2–2	0–0	3–1	0–0	4–0	0–0	3–0	1–1	2–0	1–1
Chievo	0–0	1–1	2–2	2–1	—	1–1	3–1	2–1	1–0	0–0	1–2	1–1	1–0	2–2	3–1	3–2	1–1	0–1	2–1	2–2
Cosenza	1–0	0–1	2–2	1–0	2–0	—	0–0	1–0	1–0	2–1	1–0	1–1	3–0	1–3	0–0	1–2	1–0	1–1	1–1	1–0
Empoli	2–1	0–0	2–0	2–1	4–2	3–2	—	1–0	0–0	2–1	4–1	1–1	2–5	1–1	0–3	1–0	1–0	2–1	1–0	2–1
Fermana	0–1	1–0	1–2	1–0	1–1	1–1	1–1	—	2–1	0–1	3–2	0–3	0–0	2–2	1–2	1–2	3–2	2–1	1–1	1–2
Genoa	1–0	2–1	2–2	4–2	2–0	2–1	3–1	1–1	—	1–1	0–1	1–2	2–1	3–2	3–0	1–1	1–0	2–0	2–0	2–2
Monza	1–1	1–0	1–1	1–1	2–1	0–0	1–0	4–1	2–1	—	0–0	0–0	1–1	1–1	1–1	1–1	1–0	2–2	1–1	2–1
Napoli	3–1	1–0	3–0	1–1	3–2	1–0	1–0	4–0	1–3	2–2	—	1–1	0–0	1–1	3–1	1–0	1–1	2–0	2–3	2–1
Pescara	0–0	0–1	1–2	4–0	2–1	1–1	4–1	4–2	3–1	3–3	1–1	—	1–0	1–2	2–2	4–0	4–1	1–1	2–2	0–1
Pistoiese	1–1	0–0	0–1	0–2	2–1	1–0	2–0	1–1	2–1	0–0	0–1	0–0	—	2–0	1–0	0–1	2–1	3–2	1–0	3–1
Ravenna	0–0	1–3	0–0	2–0	2–2	0–0	1–1	1–0	2–0	2–0	0–0	2–1	1–2	—	2–0	0–1	4–0	1–0	0–0	2–1
Salernitana	3–2	0–1	2–0	1–1	3–0	4–1	1–1	3–1	1–0	1–1	1–1	4–3	2–0	3–0	—	1–1	1–3	0–2	2–0	3–2
Sampdoria	3–2	1–0	0–0	1–1	0–0	2–0	1–1	1–1	0–1	2–1	0–2	2–1	1–0	2–1	2–4	—	2–1	2–2	2–0	3–1
Savoia	1–1	1–2	2–3	0–0	2–2	2–2	1–0	2–1	0–2	1–2	0–1	2–2	1–1	2–0	0–0	1–0	—	0–1	1–0	1–1
Ternana	1–0	1–1	2–2	2–2	1–3	3–0	1–1	2–1	2–2	2–2	2–2	1–1	1–0	0–0	1–1	0–1	3–1	—	1–0	1–0
Treviso	2–0	2–1	1–1	2–1	1–0	2–1	0–0	3–2	1–1	3–1	5–1	2–2	3–3	1–1	7–1	1–0	3–0	3–1	—	0–1
Vicenza	3–1	5–3	2–1	3–2	1–2	2–0	6–0	4–0	1–1	2–1	3–0	3–1	2–1	1–0	2–0	2–1	3–2	0–0	2–0	—

Source: Almanacco Illustrato del Calcio - La Storia 1898-2004, Panini Edizioni, Modena, September 2005
Legend: Blue = home team win; Yellow = draw; Red = away team win.

== Relegation tie-breaker ==
15 June 2000

Pistoiese	3–1	Cesena
Castiglione 8'; Bellotto 15'; Colombo 80'		Taldo 30' (pen.)

Stadio Marcello Melani, Pistoia
Referee: Domenico Messina
18 June 2000

Cesena	1–0	Pistoiese
Cangini 21'

Stadio Dino Manuzzi, Cesena
Referee: Graziano Cesari

A.C. Cesena relegated to Serie C1 2000-01.

== Attendances ==
#	Club	Average
1	Napoli	32,835
2	Sampdoria	16,709
3	Salernitana	15,791
4	Atalanta	14,388
5	Genoa	12,928
6	Vicenza	12,129
7	Ternana	8,559
8	Brescia	7,422
9	Pescara	6,335
10	Cesena	5,929
11	Savoia	5,892
12	Pistoiese	5,004
13	Empoli	4,601
14	Fermana	4,080
15	Cosenza	3,811
16	Treviso	3,737
17	Ravenna	3,598
18	Alzano	2,966
19	Chievo	2,680
20	Monza	2,551
