= Percassi =

Percassi is an Italian surname. Notable people with the surname include:

- Antonio Percassi (born 1953), Italian soccer player and entrepreneur, father of Luca
- Luca Percassi (born 1980), Italian soccer player and entrepreneur, son of Antonio
