= Gian Piero Ventura =

Italian football manager

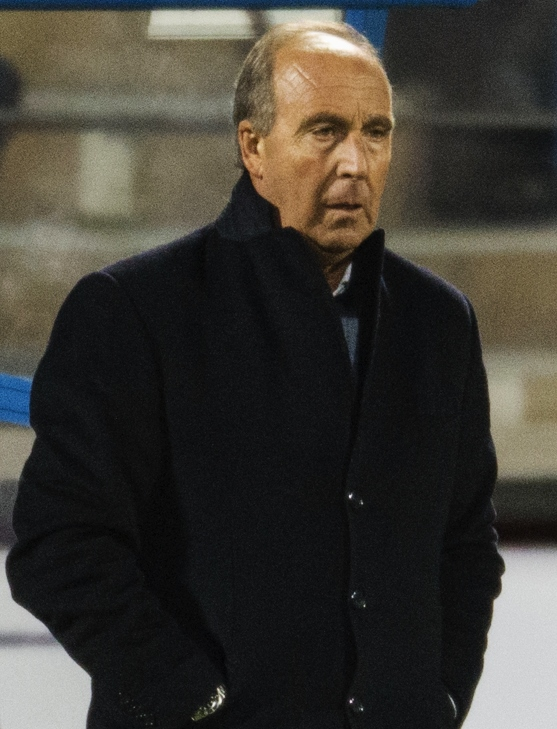
- Ventura with Torino in 2015

Personal information
- Full name: Gian Piero Ventura
- Date of birth: 14 January 1948 (age 78)
- Place of birth: Genoa, Italy
- Position: Midfielder

Youth career
- Sampdoria

Senior career*
Years	Team	Apps	(Gls)
1968–1969	Sampdoria	0	(0)
1969–1970	Sestrese	29	(0)
1970–1974	Enna	9	(0)
1974–1976	Sanremese	21	(0)
1976–1978	Novese	30	(0)

Managerial career
- 1976–1979: Sampdoria (youth team)
- 1979–1981: Sampdoria (assistant coach)
- 1981–1982: Ruentes Rapallo
- 1982–1986: Entella
- 1986: Spezia
- 1987–1989: Centese
- 1989–1992: Pistoiese
- 1992–1993: Giarre
- 1994: Venezia
- 1994–1995: Venezia
- 1995–1997: Lecce
- 1997–1999: Cagliari
- 1999–2000: Sampdoria
- 2001–2002: Udinese
- 2002–2003: Cagliari
- 2004–2005: Napoli
- 2006: Messina
- 2006–2007: Hellas Verona
- 2007–2009: Pisa
- 2009–2011: Bari
- 2011–2016: Torino
- 2016–2017: Italy
- 2018: Chievo
- 2019–2020: Salernitana
- * Club domestic league appearances and goals

Gian Piero Ventura (Italian pronunciation: [ˈdʒam ˈpjɛːro venˈtuːra]; born 14 January 1948) is an Italian football manager.

His playing career as a midfielder was spent in the lower leagues, having not made the grade at Sampdoria, where he began his coaching career with the youth team in 1976. He debuted in Serie A with Cagliari in 1998, and also managed Udinese, Messina, Bari, Torino and Chievo in the top flight.

Ventura was the manager of the Italy national team from 2016 to 2017. He was dismissed when they failed to qualify for the 2018 FIFA World Cup, their first absence from the tournament since 1958.

== Early years ==
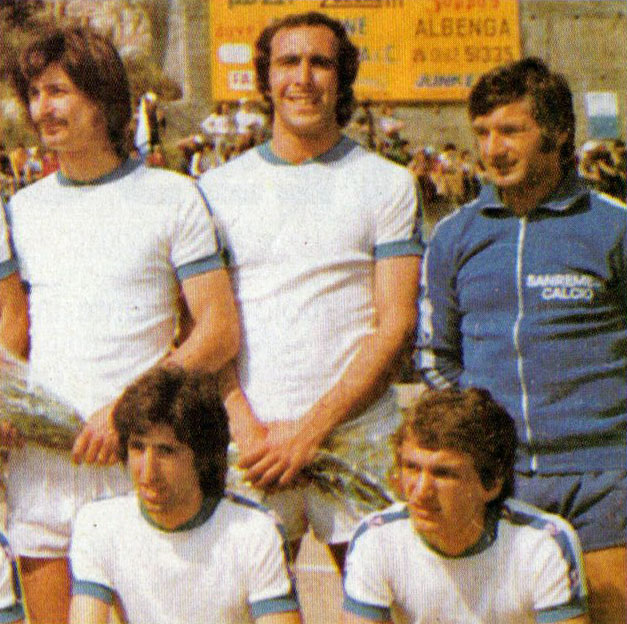
Ventura with Sanremese in the 1974–75 season

Ventura grew up playing in the Sampdoria youth system. Unable to land a place in the first team, he played almost exclusively in Serie D, with the exception of the 1970–71 season in Serie C with USD Enna, with whom he made nine appearances.

== Managerial career ==
=== Early career ===
Ventura began his career as a coach in the Blucerchiati's youth system, then becoming an assistant coach in 1979. He left Sampdoria in 1981 to pursue a head coaching career, starting from several amateur teams from Liguria. In 1985, he achieved his first promotion to a professional league with Albenga and Entella.

In 1987, Ventura became head coach of Spezia in Serie C1, but did not complete the season. Two poor seasons with Centese, characterized by a sacking, a reappointment and finally a relegation to Serie C2, were followed by a three-year tenure as Pistoiese boss in the Interregionale, ended with a promotion to Serie C2 in his second season and a fourth place in the third. In 1993, he became head coach of Sicilian Serie C1 team Giarre, where he achieved an impressive fourth place, currently the best ever result ever achieved by the club.

In 1993, Ventura was appointed by Maurizio Zamparini to coach Venezia of Serie B. In his first season, Ventura obtained a good sixth place, but this was not followed by an improvement in results in his second season, which ended with his sacking.

In 1995, Ventura returned to Serie C1 at the helm of Lecce, which he led to two consecutive promotions up to Serie A. In 1997, he joined Cagliari, which he led to a quick return to Serie A. In 1998–99 he finally made his personal Serie A debut, leading Cagliari to a 12th-place finish.

=== 2000s ===
During the 1999–2000 season, he agreed a return at Sampdoria, this time as head coach, but missed promotion to Serie A after ending the season in fifth place.

After a year without a team, Ventura returned coaching during the 2001–02 season, this time at Udinese replacing sacked Roy Hodgson, obtaining just an unimpressive 14th place. From 2002 to 2003, he returned at Cagliari: a strong ninth-place finish in his first season was followed by a sacking during the next one. In 2004–05, he was appointed at the helm of refounded club Napoli, with the goal to achieve immediate promotion to Serie B. However, Ventura did not manage to guide the team to the very top table positions, and he was later fired and replaced with Edoardo Reja.

Ventura returned to coaching a Serie A club during the 2005–06 season, when he replaced Bortolo Mutti at the helm of Messina in an unsuccessful attempt to escape from relegation. In December 2006, he was hired by Verona to replace Massimo Ficcadenti. Despite a clear improvement in results his club, which was in the bottom of the table at Ventura's appointment time, did not manage to avoid playing a relegation playoff, losing it to Spezia.

In June 2007, Ventura was announced as new head coach of newly promoted Serie B club Pisa. After an impressive first season with Pisa, ended with Pisa unexpectedly playing in the promotion playoffs (then being eliminated by Lecce, who later defeated AlbinoLeffe to win promotion in the top flight), a club takeover from Rome-based entrepreneur Luca Pomponi raised rumours about his possible replacement with Alessandro Costacurta. He was later confirmed by the new property after Costacurta declined interest in the managerial position, only to be sacked in April 2009 following a string of unimpressive results.

=== Bari ===
On 26 June 2009, Ventura signed to manage Bari, replacing Antonio Conte. In the 2009–10 season, Ventura's Bari was one of the revelations of the season, combining attractive football and positive results, finishing in tenth place on 50 points (a record in Serie A for the Pugliese). Ventura would also launch the careers of young talents Leonardo Bonucci and Andrea Ranocchia, who at the end of the season would become part of the Italy national team.

The 2010–11 campaign saw Ventura confirmed as head coach. Due to a poor transfer market and a rash of injuries, Bari sat in last place at the midway point of the season. However, Bari won the Derby di Puglia against rivals Lecce on 6 January 2011, thanks to a goal from loan signing Stefano Okaka. On 10 February 2011, with Bari sitting last in the table with only one win in four months and nine points from relegation safety, Ventura agreed to part company with the club and was replaced by Bortolo Mutti.

=== Torino ===
On 6 June 2011, Ventura was announced as the new manager of Serie B side Torino ahead of the 2011–12 season, signing an annual contract. Ventura revolutionised the team with the arrival of several new players and launching the likes of Angelo Ogbonna, Kamil Glik and Matteo Darmian. He secured promotion to Serie A during the 2011–12 season on 20 May 2012 (with one matchday to spare) following a 2–0 home victory against Modena.

In the 2012–13 season, Ventura led Torino to 16th place in the top flight, securing safety from relegation on 12 May 2013 after a 1–1 draw away to Chievo. It would also see the arrival of Jean-François Gillet, Alessandro Gazzi and Alessio Cerci, Ventura's former pupils at Bari and Pisa. On 6 February 2014, Ventura renewed his contract with Torino until 2016.

In the 2013–14 season, Ventura led Torino to seventh place in Serie A and the qualifying rounds of the 2014–15 UEFA Europa League. It was also his personal best season for points secured in Serie A, with 57.

On 22 February 2015, Ventura celebrated his 100th match as Torino head coach in Serie A, seizing a 1–1 draw against Fiorentina in Florence. Four days later, he obtained a historic victory in the round of 32 of the UEFA Europa League after defeating Athletic Bilbao 3–2 in Spain, qualifying Torino for the next round; no Italian team had ever previously won in Bilbao. On 26 April, he secured a 2–1 victory against Juventus at the Stadio Olimpico in Turin, handing Torino their first victory in the derby in 20 years.

On 16 November 2015, Ventura's contract with Torino was renewed until 30 June 2018. On 16 December, he set a new record for consecutive appearances as manager of Torino, overtaking Luigi Radice, with 194 appearances. On 25 May 2016, after five years in charge of the Granata, and having closed the 2015–16 season in 12th place, he terminated his contract by mutual consent with Torino.

=== Italy ===
On 7 June 2016, Ventura was named replacement for Antonio Conte of the Italy national team, assuming his position on 18 July, following UEFA Euro 2016, and signing a two-year deal with the Italian Football Federation. On 1 September 2016, he made his debut as Italy manager in a 3–1 home defeat to France. Ventura won his first competitive match in charge of Italy four days later, in the team's opening 2018 FIFA World Cup qualification tie away to Israel, 3–1. On 9 August 2017, his contract was extended until 2020.

Italy failed to qualify for the 2018 FIFA World Cup after a 1–0 aggregate loss to Sweden in the play-offs; this was the first time since the 1958 FIFA World Cup that Italy had failed to qualify for the tournament. In the events after the match, Ventura stated, "I apologised to Italians for this result. It's horrible to see a World Cup without Italy, but it's done now and I can't do anything about it." Also when asked about the national team's performance under his leadership he stated, "My record is one of the best of the last 40 years. I lost only two games in two years." After refusing to resign, two days following the defeat, on 15 November, Ventura was sacked, with the president of the Italian Football Federation Carlo Tavecchio resigning five days later on 20 November.

=== Chievo ===
On 10 October 2018, and almost a year after missing the World Cup qualification with the Italy national team, Ventura returned into management by signing a two-year deal with last-placed Serie A club Chievo. After three defeats and one draw in his first four matches in charge, Ventura announced his resignation, and on 13 November 2018, his contract was consensually resolved.

=== Salernitana ===
On 30 June 2019, Ventura signed as manager of Serie B side Salernitana. On 1 August 2020, Ventura resigned from Salernitana after failing to secure a promotion play-off spot and being insulted by club president Claudio Lotito.

== Managerial statistics ==
As of match played 31 July 2020

Managerial record by team and tenure
Team	Nat	From	To	Record							
Team	Nat	From	To	G	W	D	L	GF	GA	GD	Win %
Giarre	(Italy)	5 June 1992	15 June 1993	37	15	13	9	39	29	+10	40.54
Venezia	(Italy)	4 July 1994	12 September 1994	3	1	0	2	2	3	−1	33.33
Venezia	(Italy)	15 December 1994	10 April 1995	15	5	3	7	20	20	+0	33.33
Lecce	(Italy)	24 June 1995	18 June 1997	82	37	29	16	112	79	+33	45.12
Cagliari	(Italy)	20 June 1997	30 June 1999	80	28	29	23	113	98	+15	35.00
Sampdoria	(Italy)	30 June 1999	12 June 2000	46	22	11	13	58	49	+9	47.83
Udinese	(Italy)	12 December 2001	21 June 2002	22	6	5	11	19	30	−11	27.27
Cagliari	(Italy)	12 September 2002	24 November 2003	55	21	17	17	77	65	+12	38.18
Napoli	(Italy)	14 June 2004	16 January 2005	19	7	6	6	22	21	+1	36.84
Messina	(Italy)	27 March 2006	16 May 2006	7	1	0	6	4	16	−12	14.29
Hellas Verona	(Italy)	25 December 2006	25 June 2007	26	10	8	8	29	29	+0	38.46
Pisa	(Italy)	2 July 2007	20 April 2009	82	31	23	28	105	99	+6	37.80
Bari	(Italy)	27 June 2009	10 February 2011	66	18	17	31	71	94	−23	27.27
Torino	(Italy)	6 June 2011	25 May 2016	217	85	64	68	299	256	+43	39.17
Italy	(Italy)	19 July 2016	15 November 2017	16	9	4	3	27	13	+14	56.25
Chievo	(Italy)	10 October 2018	13 November 2018	4	0	1	3	4	11	−7	0.00
Salernitana	(Italy)	30 June 2019	1 August 2020	40	15	10	15	56	55	+1	37.50
Career total				817	311	240	266	1,057	967	+90	38.07

== Honours ==
Lecce

- Serie C1: 1995–96

Entella

- Campionato Interregionale/Serie D: 1984–85

Pistoiese

- Campionato Interregionale/Serie D: 1990–91
