= 1980–81 Serie B =

Italian football league season

Serie B
- Season: 1980–81
- Champions: Milan; 1st title

Serie B 1980-81 team distribution

The Serie B 1980–81 was the 49th tournament of this competition played in Italy since its creation.

== Teams ==
Varese, Rimini, Catania and Foggia had been promoted from Serie C, while Pescara, Milan and Lazio had been relegated from Serie A. Milan and Lazio had been relegated due to the 1980 Totonero scandal rather than performance in the league.

== Final classification ==
Pos	Team	Pld	W	D	L	GF	GA	GD	Pts	Promotion or relegation
1	Milan (C, P)	38	18	14	6	49	29	+20	50	Promotion to Serie A
2	Genoa (P)	38	17	14	7	47	29	+18	48	Promotion to Serie A
3	Cesena (P)	38	16	16	6	44	26	+18	48	Promotion to Serie A
4	Lazio	38	13	20	5	50	32	+18	46	
5	Sampdoria	38	11	21	6	39	33	+6	43	
6	Pescara	38	14	13	11	35	38	−3	41	
7	Pisa	38	10	19	9	35	37	−2	39	
8	Bari	38	13	11	14	40	41	−1	37	
9	Rimini	38	10	16	12	40	42	−2	36	
9	Foggia	38	8	20	10	32	38	−6	36	
9	Lecce	38	11	14	13	33	40	−7	36	
12	S.P.A.L.	38	10	15	13	45	46	−1	35	
12	Catania	38	11	13	14	38	50	−12	35	
14	Palermo (Note: 5 points deducted for the Totonero 1980)	38	9	21	8	35	33	+2	34	
14	Varese	38	11	12	15	41	43	−2	34	
14	Verona	38	6	22	10	24	28	−4	34	
17	Lanerossi Vicenza (R)	38	8	17	13	34	40	−6	33	Relegation to Serie C1
18	Taranto (D, R)	38	10	15	13	29	32	−3	30	Relegation to Serie C1
19	Atalanta (R)	38	9	12	17	28	40	−12	30	Relegation to Serie C1
20	Monza (R)	38	4	17	17	24	45	−21	25	Relegation to Serie C1

Source: Panini
(C) Champions; (D) Disqualified; (P) Promoted; (R) Relegated

== Results ==
Home \ Away	ATA	BAR	CAT	CES	FOG	GEN	LRV	LAZ	LEC	MIL	MON	PAL	PES	PIS	RIM	SAM	SPA	TAR	VAR	VER
Atalanta	—	1–0	3–1	0–0	2–0	1–2	2–1	1–1	2–0	1–3	0–2	1–1	0–2	1–0	1–2	1–3	1–1	0–0	0–0	1–0
Bari	1–0	—	1–4	0–0	2–1	2–0	1–0	1–0	3–2	1–1	3–0	2–0	3–0	1–1	1–1	1–0	2–0	1–1	2–1	1–1
Catania	1–1	1–0	—	1–0	0–0	2–1	1–0	2–2	1–1	2–2	2–1	3–3	0–1	1–0	1–1	1–2	2–0	1–0	2–0	1–0
Cesena	2–0	2–0	2–0	—	2–1	2–0	2–0	2–1	1–1	0–0	2–0	3–0	2–0	1–1	2–2	0–0	3–2	1–0	1–0	2–1
Foggia	1–0	1–1	0–0	1–3	—	0–0	2–1	0–1	1–0	1–0	0–0	1–1	1–1	3–3	1–0	1–1	1–1	1–1	4–1	1–1
Genoa	2–0	1–0	3–1	1–0	4–0	—	1–1	0–0	1–0	0–0	2–0	2–0	2–1	3–1	2–0	1–1	2–1	3–1	2–1	0–0
L.R. Vicenza	0–0	2–0	4–1	0–0	0–1	2–2	—	2–2	1–0	1–1	1–0	0–0	2–1	1–2	1–0	0–0	0–0	1–0	1–0	0–0
Lazio	2–0	3–0	4–0	2–0	0–0	2–2	1–1	—	2–2	0–2	2–0	1–1	0–0	2–1	1–0	0–1	2–0	1–1	2–1	1–0
Lecce	1–0	1–3	2–1	0–0	0–0	1–0	2–1	0–0	—	2–3	1–0	1–0	2–0	2–1	1–1	4–1	0–1	1–0	1–1	1–0
Milan	1–0	1–0	4–1	1–1	1–1	2–0	2–0	1–1	2–0	—	1–0	0–0	0–0	0–1	3–1	0–1	2–1	4–0	1–0	2–1
Monza	3–2	1–1	3–3	0–0	1–0	0–2	2–2	2–2	0–0	1–2	—	1–1	0–0	0–0	1–1	0–0	0–2	0–1	0–1	1–1
Palermo	1–1	1–1	2–0	1–0	1–1	0–0	2–0	0–2	0–0	3–1	2–0	—	0–0	0–1	1–0	1–1	0–1	2–1	2–1	3–0
Pescara	0–1	2–1	1–0	2–1	3–2	2–1	2–1	0–0	1–1	1–0	1–0	0–0	—	1–0	1–0	2–1	1–1	2–1	2–2	0–0
Pisa	2–1	1–1	2–0	1–1	0–0	1–1	2–2	1–1	2–0	0–1	1–1	1–1	1–1	—	1–0	1–0	2–1	0–0	1–0	0–0
Rimini	1–1	3–1	0–0	1–1	1–0	0–0	2–2	1–3	4–0	2–2	0–1	1–1	1–1	3–1	—	0–0	1–0	1–1	1–0	1–0
Sampdoria	0–0	2–0	1–0	0–0	0–1	1–1	2–1	1–1	0–0	0–0	1–1	1–1	3–1	2–2	2–3	—	2–1	1–0	2–1	0–0
Spal	1–1	1–0	2–0	1–1	3–3	2–2	2–0	1–1	1–1	1–2	3–1	1–1	2–1	0–0	3–0	2–2	—	1–2	1–4	1–1
Taranto	0–1	1–0	0–0	1–2	2–0	1–0	0–0	1–1	0–0	3–0	1–0	1–1	3–1	0–0	0–1	1–1	0–0	—	3–2	1–0
Varese	1–0	1–0	1–1	3–1	0–0	0–1	1–1	3–2	2–1	0–0	1–1	1–0	1–0	4–0	2–2	2–2	1–3	0–0	—	1–0
Verona	1–0	2–2	0–0	1–1	0–0	0–0	1–1	1–1	3–1	1–1	0–0	1–1	2–0	0–0	2–1	1–1	1–0	1–0	0–0	—

Legend: Blue = home team win; Yellow = draw; Red = away team win.

== Attendances ==
#	Club	Average
1	Milan	31,282
2	Genoa	24,304
3	Lazio	24,148
4	Bari	18,287
5	Sampdoria	18,060
6	Palermo	14,767
7	Atalanta	14,240
8	SPAL	13,078
9	Vicenza	12,660
10	Cesena	12,638
11	Pisa	12,498
12	Hellas	11,720
13	Taranto	11,245
14	Foggia	11,168
15	Catania	10,161
16	Lecce	10,050
17	Pescara	8,761
18	Rimini	7,358
19	Varese	5,245
20	Monza	4,758

== References and sources ==
- Almanacco Illustrato del Calcio - La Storia 1898-2004, Panini Edizioni, Modena, September 2005

Specific
