= Cesare Bortolotti =

Cesare Bortolotti (1950 – 1990) was an Italian entrepreneur who was formerly the president of Atalanta B.C from 1980 to 1990.

== Life ==
Son of Achille, in 1980, he was named president of Atalanta, the team was playing in Serie B, the next season the team was relegated to Serie C1. In the following years, the team was soon promoted to the highest leagues and in June 1985, Atalanta reached the Serie A. During his tenure as president Atalanta reached the semifinal of European Cup Winners where Atalanta was defeated by Malines. In 1990, he was killed in a car accident near his house on the shore of Lake of Iseo.

Preceded by Achille Bortolotti	President of Atalanta; 1980 - 1990	Succeeded by Achille Bortolotti
