= Fermo Favini =

Italian footballer (1936–2019)

Personal information
- Date of birth: 2 February 1936
- Place of birth: Meda, Lombardy, Italy
- Date of death: 23 April 2019 (aged 83)
- Position: Midfielder

Senior career*
| Years | Team | Apps | (Gls) |
- Meda
- Como
- Brescia
- Atalanta
- Reggiana
- * Club domestic league appearances and goals

Fermo Favini, also known as Mino Favini (2 February 1936 – 23 April 2019) was an Italian professional footballer who played as a midfielder for Meda, Como, Brescia, Atalanta and Reggiana. He later worked as a scout for Atalanta.
