= Luca Percassi =

Italian footballer

Personal information
- Date of birth: 25 August 1980 (age 46)
- Place of birth: Milan, Italy
- Position: Centre back

Youth career
- –1998: Atalanta
- 1998–2000: Chelsea

Senior career*
Years	Team	Apps	(Gls)
1998–2000	Chelsea	2	(0)
2000–2002	Monza	10	(0)
2002–2004	Spezia	5	(0)
2003	→ Alzano Virescit (loan)	2	(0)
Total		19	(0)

Managerial career
- 2010–: Atalanta (CEO)
- * Club domestic league appearances and goals

Gianluca 'Luca' Percassi (born 25 August 1980 in Milan) is an Italian retired footballer.

A defender, Percassi came through the youth system at Atalanta, before signing for Chelsea as a 17-year-old, along with teammate Samuele Dalla Bona. Unlike Dalla Bona, however, he struggled to break into Chelsea's first team and only made two appearances, both as a substitute. He joined Monza on a free transfer in October 2000 and then had spells with Alzano and Spezia.

In 2004, he retired from football to enter into entrepreneurship, following his father's footsteps.

In June 2010 his father Antonio Percassi acquired the football club, Atalanta, the first club of Luca Percassi, from the Ruggeri family. Luca Percassi became the CEO (Italian: Amministratore Delegato) of Atalanta.
