= ASD Giarre Calcio 1946 =

Italian football club

Giarre
- Full name: Associazione Sportiva Dilettantistica; Giarre Calcio 1946
- Founded: 1946
- Ground: Stadio Regionale, Giarre, Italy
- Capacity: 4,400
- League: Serie D/I
- 2021–22: Serie D/I, 15th
Home colours	Away colours

A.S.D. Giarre Calcio 1946 was an Italian association football club located in Giarre, Sicily. Its colors were yellow and blue.

== History ==
The club's roots can be traced back to a club known as Associazione Sportiva Iona, founded by a president named Bottino. Due to financial constraints, the club was forced to fold and was refounded in 1948 as Societa Sportiva Giarre, in the town of Giarre the men who brought it about were;

- Nardo Patanè
- Isidoro Pino
- Giovanni Trovato
- Angelo Villaggio
- Salvatore Alpino
- Nardo Barbagallo
- Ignazio Cocuccio
- Narciso Creati
- Giovanni Panebianco
- Sebastiano Cavallaro

In its history, Giarre also played Serie C for several years; its last appearance in professional football is dated 1993/1994, when the team relegated to Serie C2 and was successively cancelled because of financial troubles. Its best result is a fourth place in 1992/1993 Serie C1/B under coach Gian Piero Ventura, successively coach of several Serie A teams.

Giarre F.C. achieved a second place in the 2005–06 Coppa Italia Dilettanti; this result allowed the Sicilian Serie D team to play in the Coppa Italia. In the first round, Giarre played against ACF Fiorentina of Serie A in Stadio Artemio Franchi, Florence. Giarre lost 3–0 to Fiorentina, after ending 0–0 the first half.

The club ended its history in 2008, after the property sold the football rights to a new franchise based in the neighbouring city of Misterbianco. A phoenix club named A.S.D. Sporting Giarre was formed and, through a number of sports rights acquisitions, reached Eccellenza in 2014 as A.S.D. Giarre Calcio. After having returned to play Serie D during the 2021–22 season, Giarre were however excluded from the league due to financial issues.

== Notable former managers ==
- (Italy) Gian Piero Ventura
- (Italy) Adriano Lombardi
