= Antonio Percassi =

Italian footballer and entrepreneur

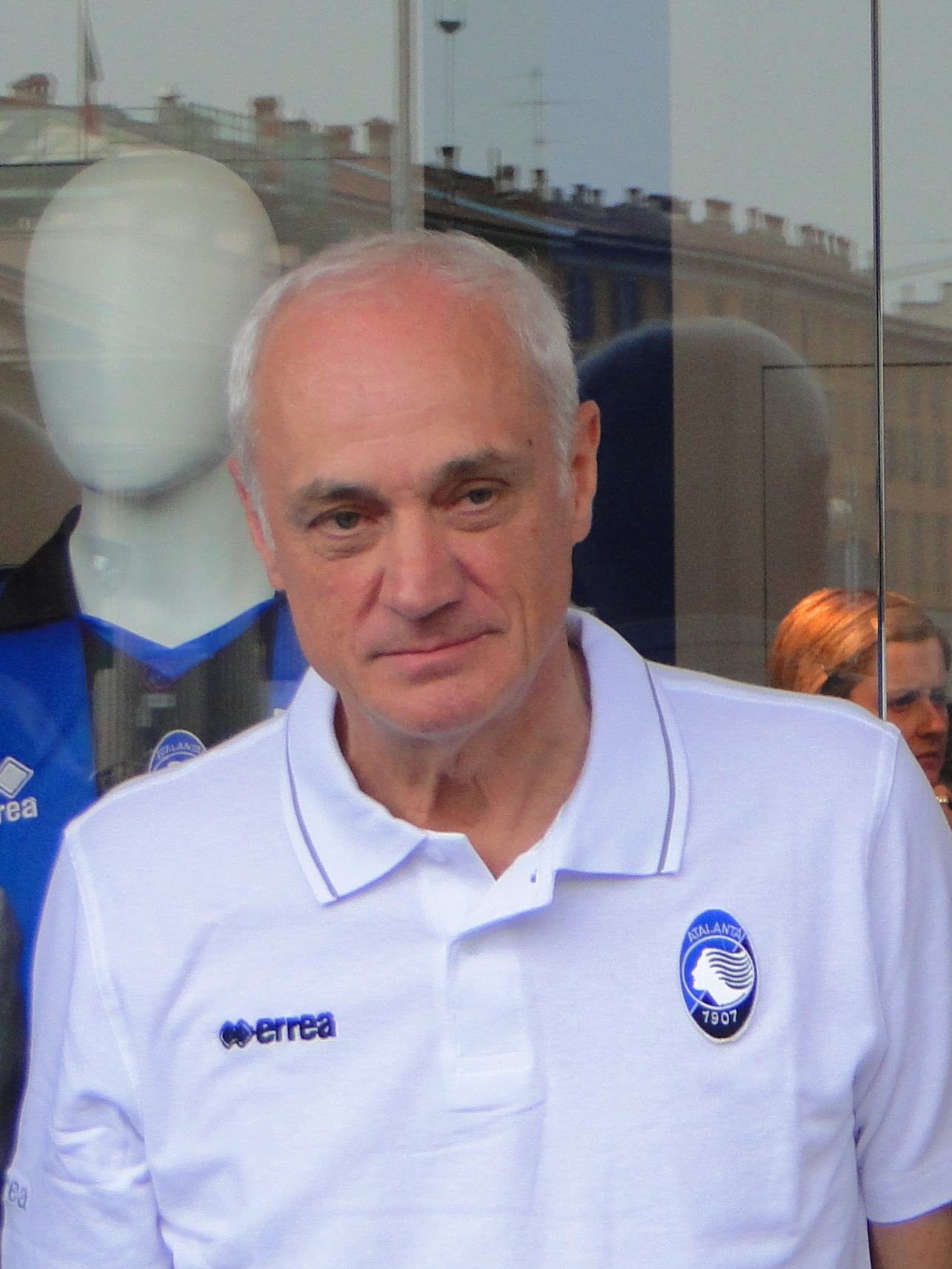
- Photo of Percassi wearing an Atalanta shirt
- Born: 9 June 1953 (age 73); Clusone, Italy
- Occupations: businessman, entrepreneur
- Board member of: Percassi (chairman); Atalanta (president)
- Website: www.percassi.it/index.html

Antonio Percassi (born 9 June 1953) is an Italian former footballer and entrepreneur.

He is president of the holding company Odissea Srl which includes the cosmetics brands KIKO Milano, Madina and Womo, formerly the Orio Center shopping center, and Italian football club Atalanta.

== Football career ==
=== Atalanta player ===
Percassi made his debut as a footballer for Atalanta, when he was seventeen. His sports career ended at 23, when he left to pursue his career as an entrepreneur.

=== Atalanta owner ===
In June 2010, Antonio Percassi returned as president (chairman) of Atalanta, a position he held from 1990 to 1994.

== Business career ==
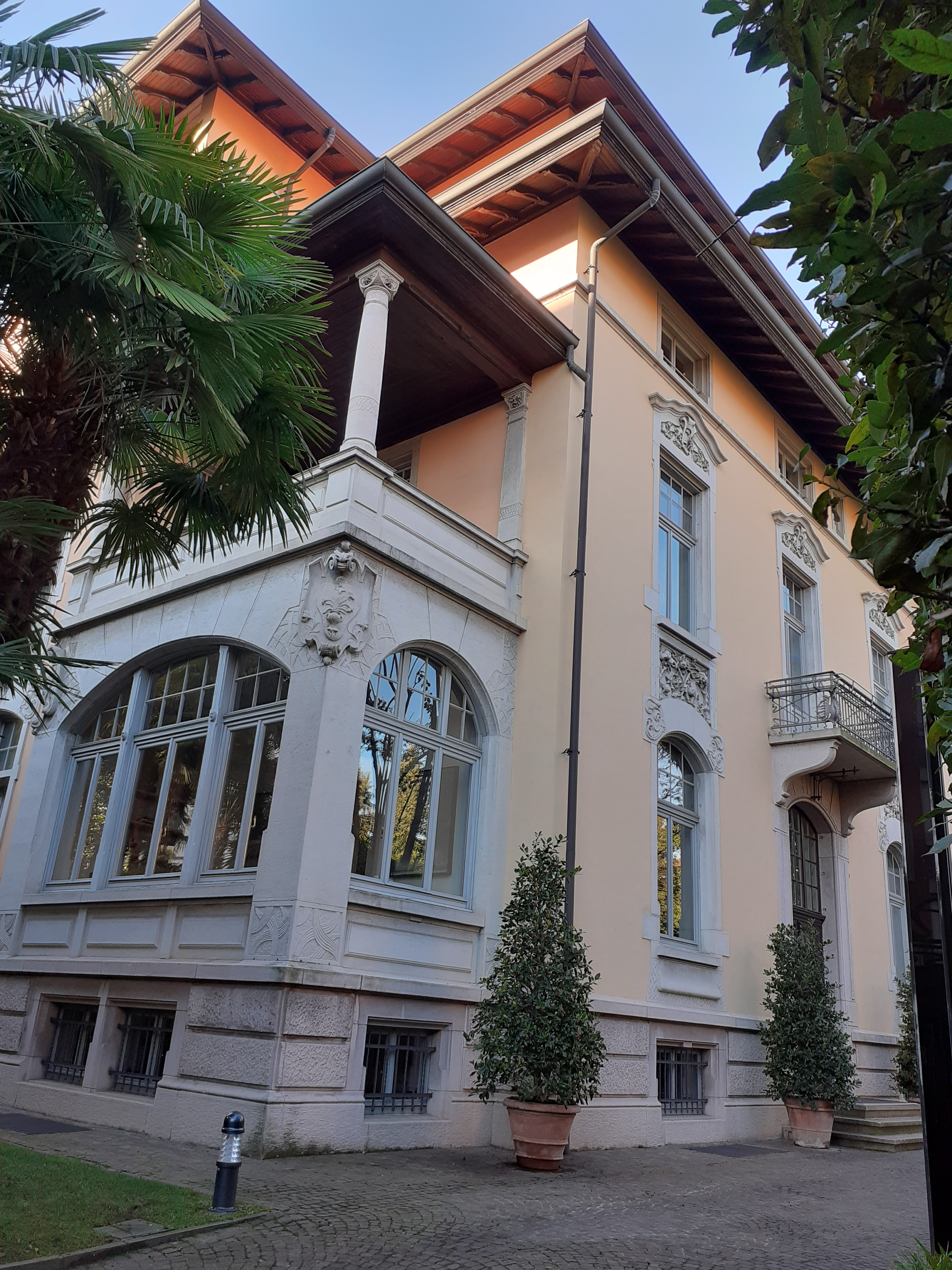
Villa Schubiger in Bergamo (1905-1910), Percassi's residence and HQ of Kiko

This marked the beginning of the Percassi activities in the retail field, and a thirty-year collaboration with the Benetton family. Over the years, Percassi headed the development of the most important brands, including United Colors, Zerdodici, Sisley, and Playlife in the Italian and international markets.

The collaboration with Benetton was the first major partnership responsible for the growth of Percassi.

Other collaborations in the retail development field include those with the Swatch, Nike, Levi, Calvin Klein, Guess and Tommy Hilfiger brands, in addition to luxury brands such as Gucci, Ferrari and Ralph Lauren.

In 2012, Percassi bought Madina, the historic make up brand founded in 1993 by Intercos, and Percassi founded Womo, the men's body care brand.

In 1997, Antonio Percassi has also ventured into the cosmetics market with the brand Kiko Make Up Milano, with the help of his son Stefano. The Kiko brand has a prestigious reputation and experienced rapid international expansion.

Then, in 2001, Percassi joined with the Inditex Group, to bring the Zara brand into the Italian market. The first Zara megastore opened in the Corso Vittorio Emanuele in Milan. Additional stores have been opened up.

In 2007, Antonio Percassi partnered with designer Flavio Briatore in developing the luxury-clothing brand, Billionaire Italian Couture.

One of the management strategies of Percassi has been the inter-development between the retail development and real estate development. This has led to the development of major development projects, including the Orio Center Shopping Center, the Antegnate Shopping Center in Bergamo, and the Sicily Outlet Village in Agira.

== Other projects ==
Percassi has worked in collaboration with the Westfield group in opening the Westfield Milan Shopping Center in Milan. This shopping center is stated to be the largest shopping center in Europe.

Percassi is also involved in a commercial and residential initiative in the Grand Canyon in Arizona.

In September 2009, Antonio Percassi was awarded an "Honorary Degree" in Construction Engineering from the University of Bergamo.

In October 2013, Antonio Percassi purchased Crespi d'Adda (a UNESCO World Heritage Site) in order to convert into the headquarters for the Percassi Business group as well as the headquarters for the new Antonio Percassi Family Foundation. Percassi planned to renovate the settlement beginning in January 2014 and make it his company's new headquarters, as well as a research center, cultural center and headquarters for the newly created Antonio Percassi Family Foundation.

== Personal life and family ==
Antonio Percassi has six children, five of whom have been involved in the operations of the various Percassi companies. His son Stefano Percassi is CEO of KIKO and Billionaire Italian Couture, and his sons Matteo and Luca manage major Real Estate development projects (Luca is also CEO of Atalanta Bergamasca Calcio). His daughters Giuliana and Federica are involved in Percassi retail operations. His youngest son, Michael was born in January 2013. In February 2013, Stefano and Luca were both named Vice President of the Odissea S.r.l. holding group.

== Honours ==
- Italian Football Hall of Fame: 2019
