= 1999–2000 Serie C1 =

The Serie C1 1999-2000 was the twenty-second edition of the major competition of the present-day Serie C.

== Group A (North) ==
 1. SIENA                      58                Promoted to Serie B
----------------------------------
 2. Pisa                       57
 3. CITTADELLA                 55                Promoted to Serie B after play off
 4. Varese                     53
 5. Brescello                  50
----------------------------------
 6. Lucchese                   49
 7. Livorno                    46
 8. Spal                       46
 9. Albinoleffe                45
10. Como                       44
11. Carrarese                  41
12. Modena                     41
13. Reggiana                   40
----------------------------------
14. Lumezzane                  38
15. Lecco                      36
16. Cremonese                  35                Relegated to Serie C2 after play out
17. Montevarchi                32                Relegated to Serie C2 after play out
----------------------------------
18. Sandonà                    26                Relegated to Serie C2

== Group B (South) ==
 1. CROTONE                    69                Promoted to Serie B
----------------------------------
 2. ANCONA                     62                Promoted to Serie B after play off
 3. Ascoli                     56
 4. Viterbese                  53
 5. Arezzo                     52
----------------------------------
 6. Palermo                    52
 7. Catania                    49
 8. Nocerina                   45
 9. Avellino                   44
10. Giulianova                 43
11. Castel di Sangro           43
12. Lodigiani                  41
13. Benevento                  41
----------------------------------
14. Juve Stabia                41                Relegated to Serie C2 after play out
15. Fidelis Andria             34
16. Gualdo                     32                Relegated to Serie C2 after play out
17. Atletico Catania           25
----------------------------------
18. Marsala                    25                Relegation and bankruptcy

== Play-off ==
Rules: 2nd against 5th, 3rd against 4th, then final

==== A ====
Semifinals
Brescello	1 - 1	Pisa
Pisa	0 - 1	Brescello
Varese	1 - 0	Cittadella
Cittadella	2 - 0	Varese

Final
Cittadella	0 - 0; 1-1 dts	Brescello

==== B ====
Semifinals
Arezzo	1 - 1	Ancona
Ancona	2 - 1	Arezzo
Viterbese	0 - 1	Ascoli
Ascoli	1 - 0	Viterbese

Final
Ancona	0 - 0; 1-1 dts	Ascoli

== Play-out ==
Rules: 14th against 17th, 15th against 16th

==== A ====
#
Montevarchi	0 - 0	Lumezzane
Lumezzane	1 - 0	Montevarchi
Cremonese	2 - 1	Lecco
Lecco	2 - 0	Cremonese

==== B ====
#
Atletico Catania	3 - 0	Juve Stabia
Juve Stabia	1 - 0	Atletico Catania
Gualdo	1 - 0	Fidelis Andria
Fidelis Andria	3 - 1	Gualdo

== References and sources ==
- Almanacco Illustrato del Calcio - La Storia 1898-2004, Panini Edizioni, Modena, September 2005

Specific
