= 1981–82 Serie C1 =

The Serie C1 1981-1982 was the fourth edition of the rebranded major competition of the present-day Serie C.

== Group A (North) ==
	Classifica	Pt
1.	Atalanta	49
2.	Monza	47
3.	Modena	46
4.	Lanerossi	46
5.	Padova	40
6.	Triestina	40
7.	Trento	32
8.	Fano	31
9.	Parma	31
10.	Treviso	31
11.	Forlì	30
12.	Piacenza	30
13.	Sanremese	30
14.	Empoli	29
15.	Rhodense	28
16.	Mantova	27
17.	Alessandria	25
18.	Sant'Angelo	18

== Group B (South) ==
	Classifica	Pt
1.	Arezzo	47
2.	Campobasso	46
3.	Nocerina	45
4.	Salernitana	43
5.	Benevento	37
6.	Paganese	35
7.	Campania	34
8.	Casertana	34
9.	Ternana	34
10.	Reggina	33
11.	Taranto	32
12.	Livorno	31
13.	Rende	30
14.	Casarano	28
15.	Civitanovese	27
16.	Francavilla	27
17.	Giulianova	27
18.	Latina	22

== References and sources ==
- Almanacco Illustrato del Calcio - La Storia 1898-2004, Panini Edizioni, Modena, September 2005

Specific
