= Bortolo Mutti =

Italian footballer and manager (born 1954)

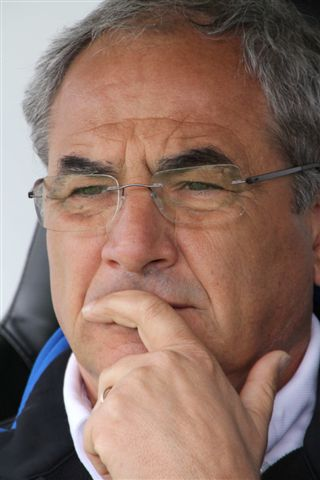

Personal information
- Date of birth: 11 August 1954 (age 72)
- Place of birth: Trescore Balneario, Italy
- Height: 1.82 m (6 ft 0 in)
- Position: Striker

Senior career*
Years	Team	Apps	(Gls)
1974–1975	Massese	25	(0)
1975–1976	Pescara	33	(6)
1976–1977	Catania	33	(8)
1977–1980	Brescia	109	(28)
1980–1981	Taranto	32	(9)
1981–1984	Atalanta	99	(24)
1984–1987	Mantova	96	(28)
1987–1988	Palazzolo	28	(10)

Managerial career
- 1988–1989: Palazzolo
- 1991–1993: Leffe
- 1993–1995: Verona
- 1995–1996: Cosenza
- 1996–1997: Piacenza
- 1997–1998: Napoli
- 1998–1999: Atalanta
- 1999–2001: Cosenza
- 2001–2002: Palermo
- 2002–2003: Reggina
- 2003–2006: Messina
- 2007–2008: Modena
- 2008–2009: Salernitana
- 2010: Atalanta
- 2011: Bari
- 2011–2012: Palermo
- 2013–2014: Padova
- 2015–2016: Livorno
- * Club domestic league appearances and goals

Bortolo Mutti (born 11 August 1954) is an Italian football manager and a former player.

His older brother, Tiziano Mutti, also played professional football. To distinguish them, Tiziano was referred to as Mutti I and Bortolo as Mutti II.

== Career ==
After a reasonably good playing career as a striker/attacking midfielder with a number of Serie B and Serie C teams, including Atalanta, Mutti became a coach in 1988, when he made his debut at the helm of Interregionale club Palazzolo. From 1991 to 1993, he coached Leffe, achieving an impressive promotion to Serie C1. From 1993 to 1995, he served as coach of Serie B club Verona, finishing 10th twice with the gialloblu. Later called to coach Serie B team Cosenza during the 1995–96 season, he led the club to avoid relegation.

In 1996, he had his first opportunity to coach a Serie A team, Piacenza, and kept the team in the Italian top flight. In 1997, he was called by Napoli, but was sacked soon after due to poor results in the Serie A. A sixth-place finish in Serie B with Atalanta in 1998–99 was followed by a return to Cosenza, where he served as head coach for two seasons, achieving 11th and 8th place finishes. In 2001–02 he was appointed at the helm of newly promoted Serie B team Palermo, where he ended the season with an 11th place. He was called back by a Serie A team, Reggina, but was fired in mid-season.

From 2003 to 2006, he moved to the other side of the local strait, at Messina, where Mutti achieved a promotion to Serie B in his first season; a very impressive seventh place followed this in their first Serie A campaign. However, Mutti's third season with Messina was not as successful as the previous two, being fired during the final part of the season. From February 2007, he has been the coach of Serie B club Modena, being sacked at the end of the 2007–08 season due to a string of poor results.

On 11 January 2010 he agreed to return at his previous club Atalanta, taking over at the relegation-battling Serie A outfit from resigning boss Antonio Conte. He ultimately failed in his desperate attempt to save Atalanta, ending the season in a disappointing eighteenth place, which led his club not to confirm him for the new season.

On 10 February 2011 Mutti became the new head coach of bottom-placed Serie A club Bari in place of Giampiero Ventura. But, Bari were subsequently relegated to Serie B and he was dismissed after the 2010–11 season.

On 19 December 2011 he agreed to return to Palermo, replacing Devis Mangia as head coach of the Serie A club from Sicily. In his first game in charge of the club, he achieved a 2–2 draw against bottom-table strugglers Novara, which was followed by a 1–3 home defeat at the hands of Napoli. After a disappointing start, results improved in January also thanks to winter signings such as Emiliano Viviano, Franco Vázquez and Massimo Donati (the latter being team captain during his previous period at Bari), leading to a string of four consecutive home wins and a 4–4 away draw at San Siro against Inter that brought Palermo back into the fight for a UEFA Europa League spot. Palermo finished in 16th in the 2011–12 season and he was released six months after taking over as head coach.
