= Itema =

Itema S.p.A.
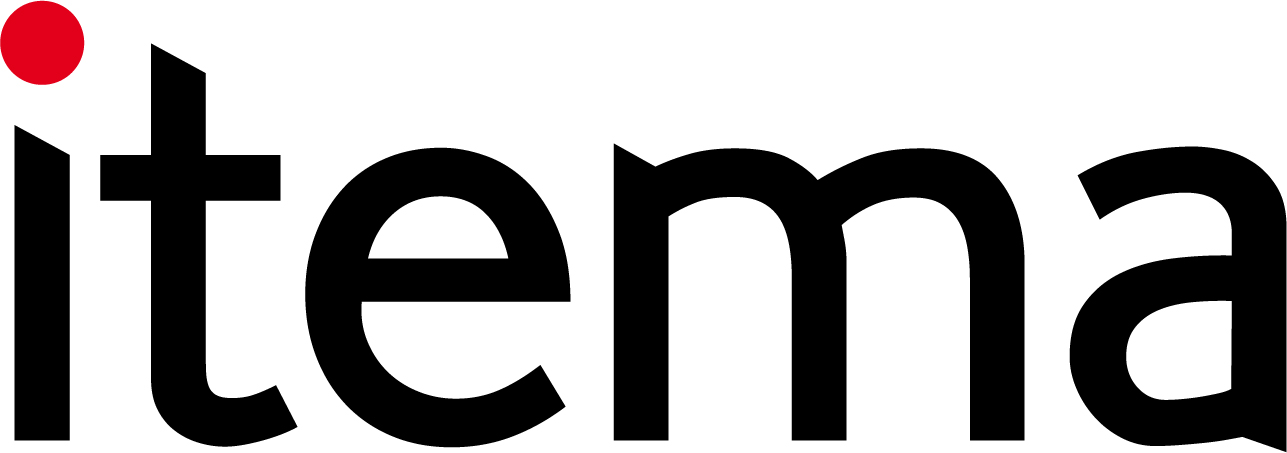
- Industry: Textile
- Founded: Colzate (2012)
- Headquarters: Colzate, Bergamo, Italy
- Area served: Worldwide
- Products: Textile machinery
- Revenue: ▲€ 250 million (2013)
- Number of employees: 850(2013)
- Subsidiaries: Switzerland, China, India, U.S., Japan
- Website: www.itemagroup.com

Itema S.p.a. is a multinational Italian company that produces textile machinery for all types of weaving.

== History ==
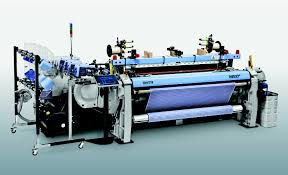
Itema textile machine

The history of Itema begins in 1967 with the birth of Somet, leading textile machinery company, in the province of Bergamo in northern Italy.

In 2000, the company changed its name to Promatech, after the acquisition of Vamatex, another important textile machinery manufacturing company, also located in the Bergamo area.

The new company acquired SulTex (Sulzer textile), a Swiss textile machinery manufacturing company, whose origins date back to 1834, and the exclusive producer of projectile looms in the world.

In 2012, the three historic brands – Somet, Vamatex and Sulzer/ Sultex – changed name and re-branded as one unique Itema brand.

In February 2014, the company launched Itema Academy, a program to recruit and retain promising young people and recent graduates in collaboration with Confindustria Bergamo, and opened ItemaLab in March, a new research incubator in the Kilometro Rosso technology park, just outside Bergamo.
