= Italo Zanzi =

American executive and attorney

- Born: Italo Andres Zanzi; May 18, 1974 (age 52); New York, U.S.
- Education: University of Chicago (BA); Emory University (JD, MBA)
- Occupations: Sports, Media, Technology Executive / Attorney

Italo Zanzi (born May 18, 1974 in New York) is an executive, attorney and entrepreneur with an extensive background in global sports, media and technology.

He is currently Executive Chairman of Serie B club Hellas Verona. and Chief Business Officer of droppGroup, a global AI/Blockchain company.

Previously, Zanzi served as a consultant for FIFA, managing media partnerships with Member Associations and the FIFA+ platform.

Between 2016 and 2019, he served as Executive Vice President & Managing Director, Sports for Asia Pacific & the Middle East in Singapore. In this role, Zanzi was responsible for all aspects of the FOX Sports Network, including production, acquisitions, digital platforms, sales and marketing across the region, stretching from Japan to Dubai.

Zanzi joined FOX from Serie A football club A.S. Roma where he was CEO for three and a half years. While at Roma, he oversaw a period of competitive success and financial improvements at the club.

Before moving to Italy, Zanzi worked on behalf of the America's Cup Event Authority overseeing media rights sales and future event planning. Until October 2011, Zanzi served as Deputy General Secretary of CONCACAF. In this capacity, Zanzi oversaw the Confederation's revenue generating activities, including the CONCACAF Champions League and Gold Cup, as well as its communications and marketing. He also represented the Confederation on FIFA's Committee for Fair Play and Social Responsibility and Media Committee.

Until November 2007, Zanzi served as Vice President for International Broadcast Sales & Latin American and United States Hispanic Marketing for Major League Baseball. In this capacity, Zanzi managed three of Major League Baseball's business functions - international television and radio sales, Latin American marketing and sponsorship, and United States Hispanic marketing initiatives.

While at MLB, Zanzi negotiated media rights agreements in Latin America, Asia, Europe, Canada, and Oceania. Zanzi also played a role in the organization of the inaugural World Baseball Classic in 2006. In addition to overseeing media sales for the event, Zanzi served as the principal liaison to the Latin American baseball federations and managed operations of the San Juan, Puerto Rico venue.

Italo Zanzi was the Republican candidate for United States Congress in 2006 in New York's 1st Congressional District (Eastern Suffolk County). Zanzi earned 38% of the vote against a two-term incumbent, the most of any Republican challenger in the Northeast, Mid-Atlantic and 7th highest nationwide. Zanzi won the endorsement from Suffolk Life, the most widely distributed newspaper in Suffolk County, which wrote, "Zanzi's outlook and enthusiasm are refreshing. He has kept a close eye on the issues that affect the people in the 1st Congressional District, and already has formulated some plans to address these issues. We are confident that if given the chance, Zanzi could effect some real change in government". Zanzi was also praised by Newsday, who while endorsing his opponent, wrote, "Republican challenger Italo Zanzi, 32, is not one to go unnoticed. Zanzi has panache, a top-flight education - including a law degree and a master's in business administration - and a glamour job...". "Zanzi has tremendous potential. Down the road there should be a place for a bright, energetic man like him in public life."

Italo Zanzi was a goalkeeper for the U.S. national handball team from 1997 to 2007. He competed in 75 international matches and won a Bronze medal at the 2003 Pan American Games. At the 2003 Pan Am Games, Zanzi had strong performances against Argentina and Brazil and played a pivotal role in the USA's victories over Mexico (21 saves) and Uruguay in the bronze medal game. He was named the United States Olympic Committee's Team Handball Athlete of the Year in 2000, 2002, and 2004.

Before being introduced to team handball in 1996 after the Summer Olympic Games in Atlanta, Zanzi was an accomplished soccer player. He played for the University of Chicago where he was named Most Valuable Player in 1995 and later spent a pre-season with the professional soccer team Club Deportivo Lo Barnechea in Chile. He also served as Assistant Coach for the Emory University men's soccer team from 1996 to 1999.

Zanzi received El Diaro's "EL Award" in 2005 which is awarded to top Hispanics in business, politics, and entertainment.

He earned a Bachelor of Arts from the University of Chicago in 1996, and Juris Doctor and MBA from Emory University in 1999.
