= Ugo Pozzan =

Italian footballer and manager

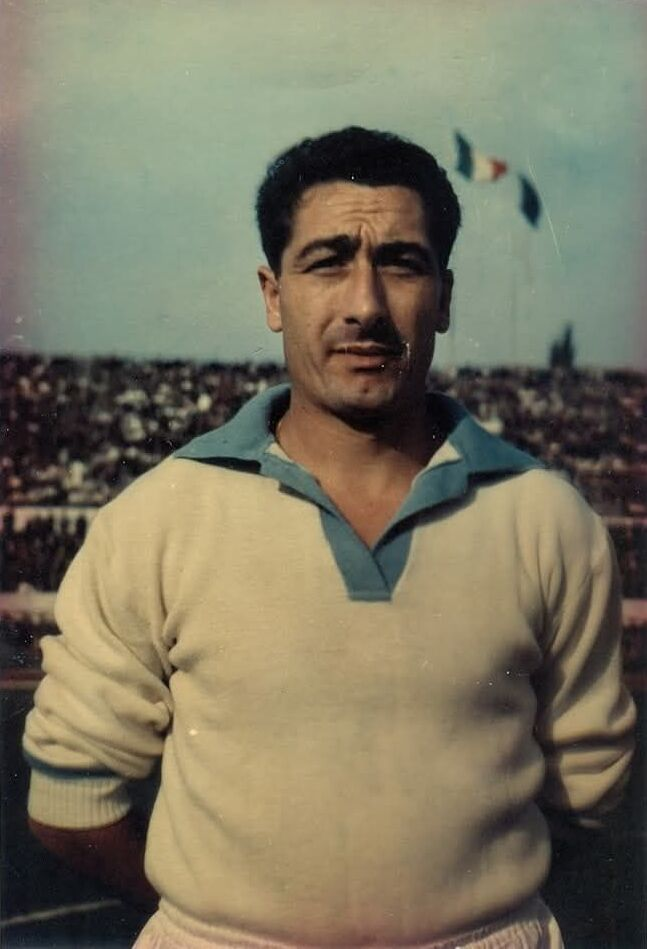
- Pozzan with Lazio between 1950s and 1960s

Personal information
- Full name: Ugo Pozzan
- Date of birth: 29 December 1929
- Place of birth: San Martino Buon Albergo, Italy
- Date of death: 4 November 1973 (aged 43)
- Place of death: Verona, Italy
- Position: Midfielder

Senior career*
Years	Team	Apps	(Gls)
1949–1953	Verona	121	(32)
1953–1957	Bologna	98	(21)
1957–1961	Lazio	82	(9)
1961–1962	Pisa	26	(1)

International career
1956	Italy	2	(0)

Managerial career
- 1966–1968: Verona
- 1968–1970: Pistoiese
- 1970–1972: Verona
- 1973: Pisa
- * Club domestic league appearances and goals

Ugo Pozzan (Italian pronunciation: [ˈuːɡo potˈtsan]; 29 December 1929 – 4 November 1973) was an Italian association football manager and footballer who played as a midfielder. He represented the Italy national football team twice, the first being on 24 June 1956, the occasion of a friendly match against Argentina in a 1–0 away loss.

== Honours ==
=== Player ===
Lazio

- Coppa Italia: 1958
