= Giancarlo Cadè =

Italian footballer (1930–2013)

Personal information
- Date of birth: 27 February 1930
- Place of birth: Zanica, Italy
- Date of death: 7 October 2013 (aged 83)
- Place of death: Zanica, Italy
- Position: Midfielder

Senior career*
Years	Team	Apps	(Gls)
1948–1950	Atalanta	4	(0)
1950–1951	Catania	24	(0)
1951–1954	Atalanta	56	(0)
1954–1955	Cagliari	7	(0)
1955–1956	Atalanta	4	(0)
1956–1958	Reggina	51	(3)
1958–1960	Mantova	39	(0)
Total		185	(3)

International career
1952	Italy	1	(0)

Managerial career
- 1963–1964: Reggiana
- 1964–1965: Verona
- 1965–1968: Mantova
- 1968–1969: Verona
- 1969–1971: Torino
- 1971–1972: Varese
- 1972–1975: Verona
- 1975–1976: Atalanta
- 1976–1978: Pescara
- 1978–1979: Cesena
- 1979–1980: Palermo
- 1980–1981: Verona
- 1981–1983: L.R. Vicenza
- 1983–1984: Bologna
- 1984–1985: Campobasso
- 1985–1986: Reggiana
- 1986–1989: Ancona
- 1989–1990: Virescit Bergamo
- 1990–1991: Ravenna
- * Club domestic league appearances and goals

Giancarlo Cadè (Italian pronunciation: [dʒaŋˈkarlo kaˈde]; 27 February 1930 – 7 October 2013) was an Italian professional football player and coach, who played as a midfielder.

== Club career ==
Born in Zanica, Cadè played for six seasons (64 games, no goals) in the Serie A for Atalanta B.C.

== International career ==
Cadè played his only game for the Italy national team on 16 July 1952 at the 1952 Summer Olympics, against the United States.

== Managerial career ==
Among the more notable stages of Cadè's career as a manager were his times with A.C. Reggiana 1919 (his first managerial experience, promotion to Serie B), A.C. Mantova (promotion to Serie A, 9th and 16th place in the Serie A and relegation back to Serie B), second stint with Hellas Verona F.C. (10th in Serie A), A.C. Torino (7th and 8th in Serie A), A.S. Varese 1910 (relegation from Serie A), third stint with Hellas Verona F.C. (10th and 13th in Serie A), Delfino Pescara 1936 (promotion to Serie A), Bologna F.C. 1909 (promotion to Serie B) and A.C. Ancona (promotion to Serie B).

== Personal life ==
Giancarlo Cadè's younger brother Giuseppe Cadè played football professionally as well. To distinguish them, Giancarlo was referred to as Cadè I and Giuseppe as Cadè II.

== Death ==
Cadé died, aged 83, in Zanica on 7 October 2013.
