= Montorio Veronese =

Coordinates: 45°27′N 11°04′E

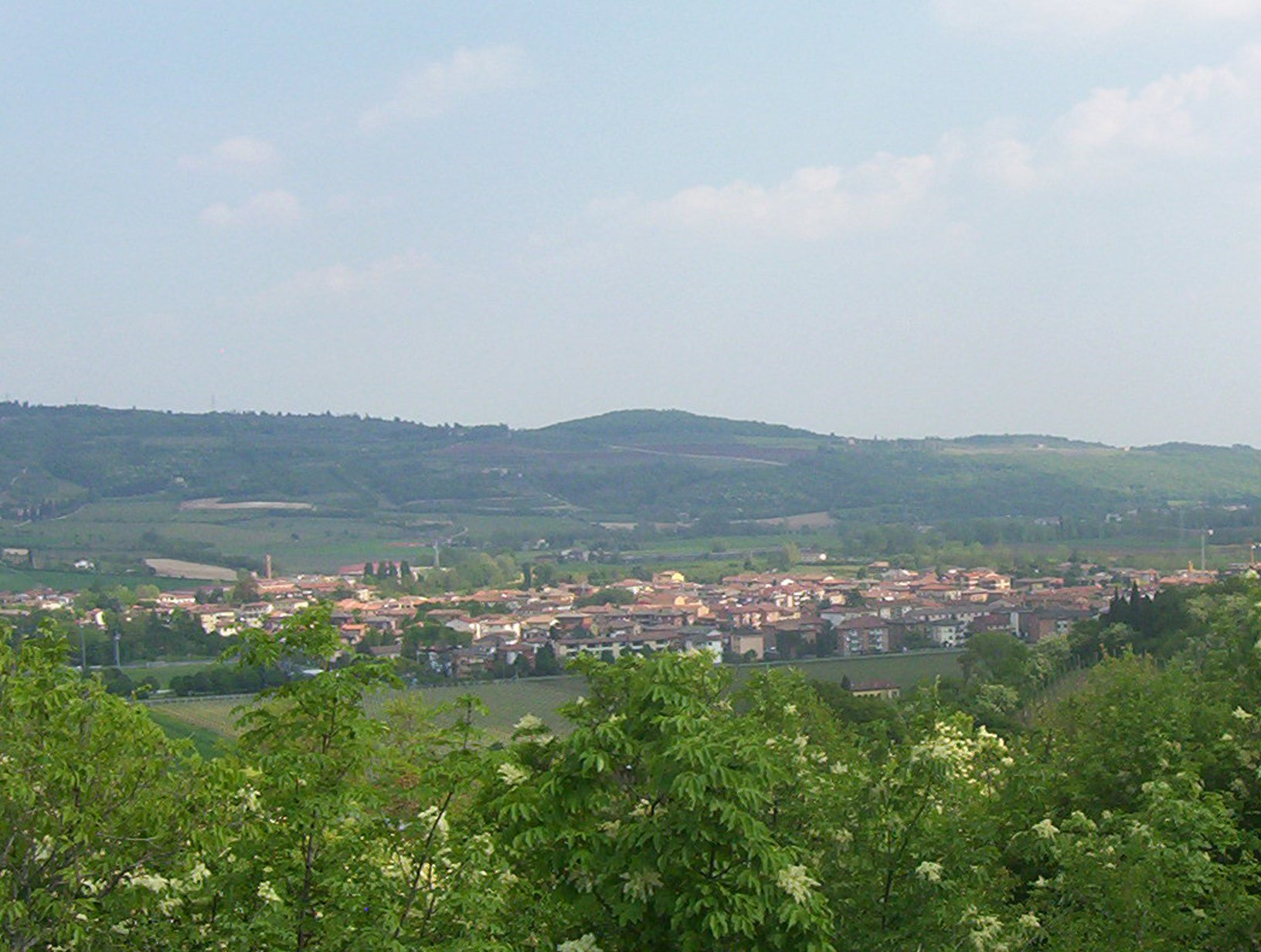

Montorio Veronese is a frazione of Verona in Northern Italy. It is part of the 8th "Circoscrizione" (district) of the town, and is located 6 km North-East of the town centre of Verona, near Ponte Florio, Mizzole, Borgo Venezia and San Michele Extra. The village used to have 6358 inhabitants in 2002.

== History ==
=== Toponym ===
Before the Roman settlement, where now the castle is visible, the area was inhabited by Raetian populations, which called the hill "taurus", which means mountain. When the Romans arrived, they probably misunderstood the meaning of the word, thinking it was the proper name of the hill, so that they called the area mons-taurus (Mount Taurus) in Latin. If this is confirmed, Montorio would literally mean "Mount-Mount".

== Economy ==
Montorio Veronese is the home of the Franklin & Marshall clothing company.
