= Maickel Ferrier =

Dutch retired professional footballer (born 1976)

Personal information
- Date of birth: 27 January 1976 (age 50)
- Place of birth: Enschede, Netherlands
- Height: 1.89 m (6 ft 2 1/2 in)
- Position: Right-back

Youth career
- SV Amstelland
- JOS

Senior career*
Years	Team	Apps	(Gls)
1992–1993	Haarlem	1	(0)
1993–1996	Volendam	13	(2)
1996–1998	Salernitana		
1997	→ Catania (loan)	14	(0)
1998–2003	Cambuur	125	(5)
2003–2004	Helmond Sport	32	(3)
2004–2005	Stormvogels Telstar	12	(0)
2005–2006	TOP Oss	17	(1)
- * Club domestic league appearances and goals as of 16 September 2017

Maickel Ferrier (born 27 January 1976) is a Dutch retired professional footballer who played as a defender, spending the majority of his career in the Dutch Eerste Divisie.

== Club career ==
Ferrier made his Eerste Divisie debut with club Haarlem during the 1992–1993 season and he also played for Dutch clubs FC Volendam, Cambuur, Helmond Sport, Stormvogels Telstar, and TOP Oss, who released him in 2006. He also had a stint in the Italian Serie B with Salernitana who loaned him to Catania.

=== Racist incident ===
Before joining Salernitana, the dark-skinned Ferrier was subject to a racist incident by the Hellas Verona ultra's after he had just signed for the club. Verona subsequently cancelled the deal, citing Ferrier was suffering from heart problems.

== Post-playing career ==
After retiring as a player at amateur side VVSB, Ferrier started a few restaurants and later started a football camp in Spain.
