= Franklin & Marshall (company) =

Italian clothing manufacturer and retailer

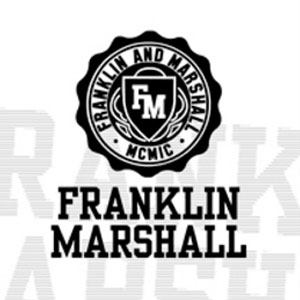
- Company type: Clothing
- Founded: 1999
- Headquarters: Montorio Veronese, Verona, Veneto, Italy
- Website: Official website

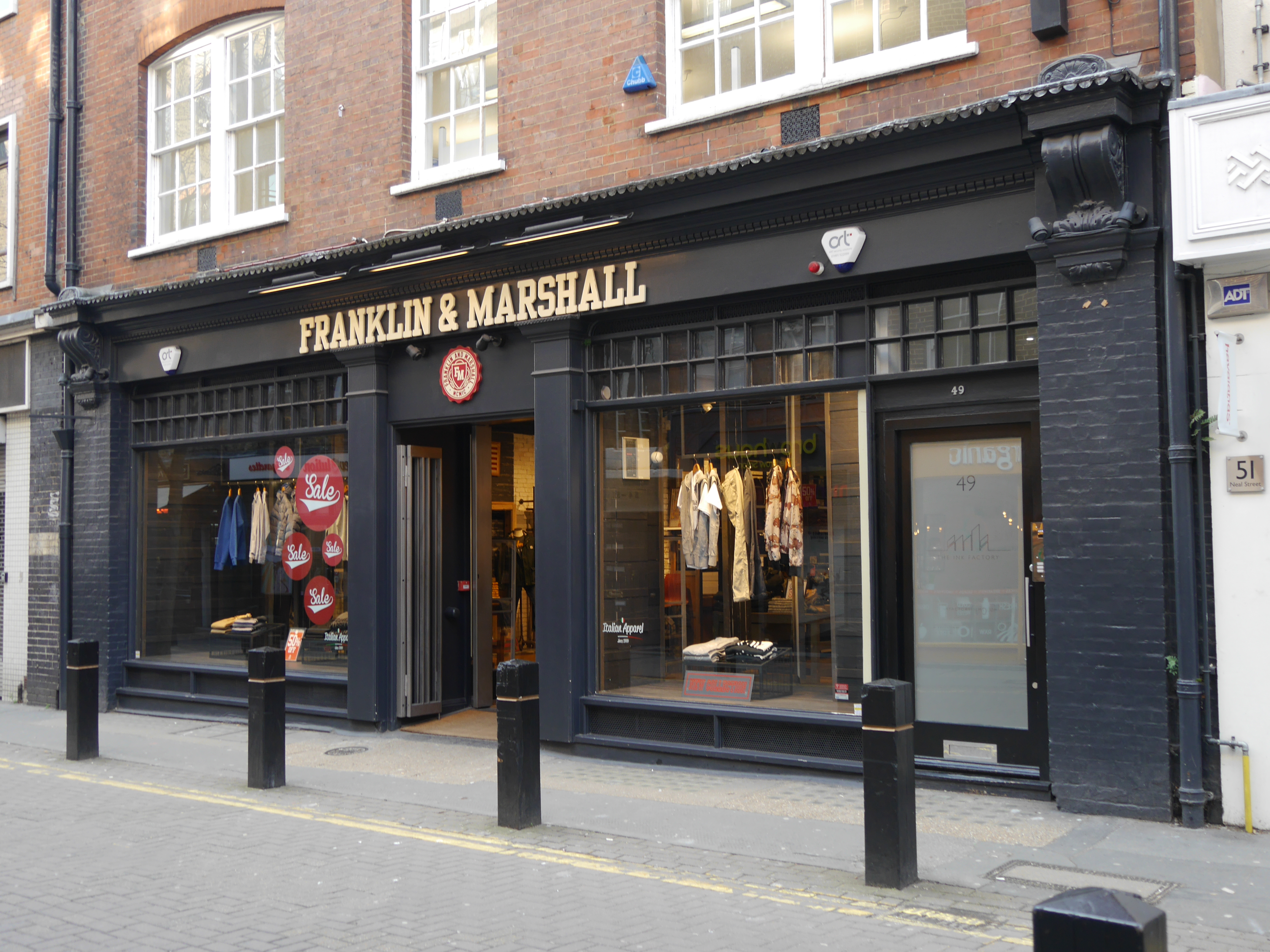
Franklin & Marshall, Neal Street, Covent Garden

Franklin & Marshall is an Italian clothing manufacturer and retailer, founded and headquartered in Montorio Veronese, a town in the province of Verona in 1999.

The company was founded in 1999 by two entrepreneurs in Montorio Veronese, a town in the province of Verona. The founders, Giuseppe Albarelli and Andrea Pensiero, discovered an old Franklin & Marshall College (based in Lancaster, Pennsylvania) jumper in a London charity shop, and started a fashion label because they liked the name.

90% of their clothing is made in Italy.
