= Sundek =

Beachwear brand

- Formerly: Sun‑Dek (1940s)
- Type: Privately held company
- Industry: Fashion, surfwear
- Founded: 1958; 68 years ago
- Headquarters: Campi Bisenzio, Tuscany, Italy
- Area served: Worldwide
- Key people: Tiziano Sgarbi (Owner, since 2020)
- Products: Swimwear, boardshorts, beachwear, apparel, accessories
- Number of employees: 50–100
- Website: sundek.us

Sundek is an international surfwear and beachwear brand founded in 1958 in San Francisco, California. Originally launched under the name Sun‑Dek in the late 1940s, the company pioneered quick‑dry nylon swim trunks for surfers. Today, Sundek designs and distributes apparel and accessories for men, women, and children through its own retail stores, distributors, multibrand retailers, and e-commerce platforms.

== History ==
Sundek was founded in San Francisco in 1958. It becomes one of the first dedicated surfwear brands, innovating nylon swim trunks tailored to the needs of surfers.

During the 1960s, Sundek expanded its reach to Hawaii and the US East Coast and began sponsoring surfers, embedding itself in surf culture. In 1972, the company introduced its signature "Rainbow" boardshorts—model M504BDTA100—with triple‑stitched quick‑dry nylon fabric and colorful curved stripes.

By the mid‑1990s Sundek had established a strong presence in Europe. Around 2010, the brand experienced a revival in Italy, where its fashion‑forward approach to beachwear attracted a new following. In 2020, Italian entrepreneurs Simona Barbieri and Tiziano Sgarbi acquired Sundek and led a comprehensive relaunch. Under their ownership, the brand expanded into over 1,500 multi‑brand retailers and opened 21 standalone stores across Italy, with additional outlets in France, Spain, the United States, and Kuwait.

== Activities ==
Sundek designs and manufactures swimwear, apparel, and accessories for men, women, and children. Its product range includes boardshorts, walkshorts, t-shirts, hoodies, jackets, bikinis, one-piece swimsuits, dresses, skirts, and accessories such as hats and towels.
